= City University of New York =

Public university system in New York City, New York, US

- Motto: Eruditio populi liberi spes gentium (Latin)
- Motto in English: The education of free people is the hope of Mankind
- Type: Public university system
- Established: 1961; 65 years ago
- Budget: $1.57 billion (FY 2026)
- Chancellor: Félix V. Matos Rodríguez
- Provost: Alicia M. Alvero
- Academic staff: 19,568
- Administrative staff: 33,099
- Students: 246,503 (Fall 2025)
- Location: New York City, U.S.
- Campus: 25 campuses
- Website: cuny.edu

The City University of New York (CUNY, pronounced /ˈkjuːni/ KYOO-nee) is the public university system of New York City, United States. It is the largest urban university system in the United States, comprising 26 campuses: 11 senior colleges, seven community colleges, and eight professional institutions. The university enrolls more than 275,000 students. CUNY alumni include 13 Nobel Prize winners and 24 MacArthur Fellows.

The oldest constituent college of CUNY, City College of New York, was originally founded in 1847 and became the first free public institution of higher learning in the United States. In 1960, John R. Everett became the first chancellor of the Municipal College System of New York City, later known as the City University of New York (CUNY). CUNY, established by New York state legislation in 1961 and signed into law by Governor Nelson Rockefeller, was an amalgamation of existing institutions and a new graduate school.

The system was governed by the Board of Higher Education of the City of New York, created in 1926, and later renamed the Board of Trustees of CUNY in 1979. The institutions merged into CUNY included the Free Academy (later City College of New York), the Female Normal and High School (later Hunter College), Brooklyn College, and Queens College. CUNY has historically provided accessible education, especially to those excluded or unable to afford private universities. The first community college in New York City was established in 1955 with shared funding between the state and the city, but unlike the senior colleges, community college students had to pay tuition.

The integration of CUNY's colleges into a single university system took place in 1961, under a chancellor and with state funding. The Graduate Center, serving as the principal doctorate-granting institution, was also established that year. In 1964, Mayor Robert F. Wagner Jr. extended the senior colleges' free tuition policy to community colleges. The 1960s saw student protests demanding more racial diversity and academic representation in CUNY, leading to the establishment of Medgar Evers College and the implementation of the Open Admissions policy in 1970. This policy dramatically increased student diversity but also introduced challenges like low retention rates. The 1976 fiscal crisis ended the free tuition policy, leading to the introduction of tuition fees for all CUNY colleges.

== History ==
=== 19th century ===
==== Social context ====
Historians Willis Rudy and Harry Noble Wright identify "the growing democratization of American life," rapid urban development and increased immigration as the socio-cultural trends leading to the founding of the Free Academy. They note that "the birth of the Free Academy in the metropolis of the New World came at the very time that European revolutionists were struggling for freedom and democracy in the Old." In the mid-19th century, free elementary and high schools sprouted up all across the country in an educational renaissance borne of organized labor, the expansion of suffrage, and industrialization. New York City, a booming metropolis and predominant seaport in the Western hemisphere, was uniquely situated to forge ambitious educational initiatives. The first free denominational schools were established on Manhattan Island in 1633; a system of secular schools was established in 1805. From 1825 to 1860, New York City's population rose from 166,000 residents to 814,000, making it the third largest city in the Western world. A number of newcomers were mercantilists from New England drawn to the advantages of New York's harbor, while "in the decades prior to the Civil War the farms of Ireland and the villages of Germany were the chief sources of New York's newcomers." The shifting demographics of the city spurred new debates over the creation of public higher education.

==== Debates on the Free Academy ====
On March 15, 1847, Townsend Harris, then president of the city's Board of Education, published a letter in The Morning Courier and New York Enquirer that proposed a free public school where the children of the poor would have the possibility of advancement:

No, Sirs, the system now pursued by that excellent society and by our ward schools is the true one, and may be advantageously applied to higher seminaries of learning. Make them the property of the people - open the doors to all - let the children of the rich and the poor take their seats together and know of no distinction save that of industry, good conduct, and intellect. A large number of the children of the rich now attend our public schools, and the ratio is rapidly increasing.

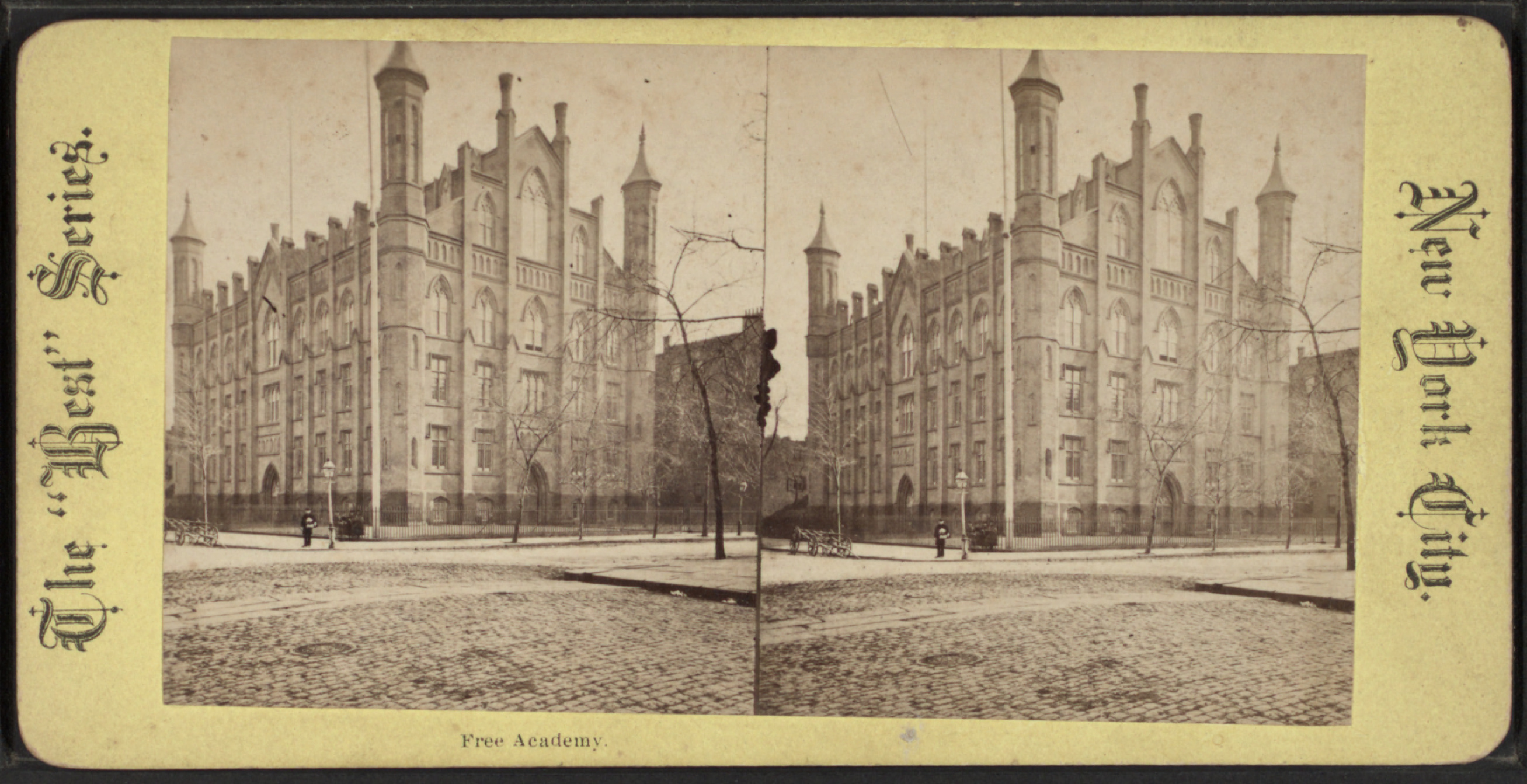
Robert N. Dennis collection of stereoscopic views. / United States. / States / New York / New York City / Stereoscopic views of schools and universities, New York City. (Approx. 72,000 stereoscopic views : 10 × 18 cm. or smaller.)

This establishment of the Free Academy hailed "first municipal institution for free higher education to appear on this globe." This was not without debate, discussed in the newspapers of the day. Two of Harris's supporters, James Gordon Bennett of the New York Herald, and William Cullen Bryant of the Evening Post, supported the idea in their editorial pages. Horace Greeley, founder and editor of the publication the New-York Tribune and later a member of the Board of Education opposed the use of public funds for the school, although he supported its overall mission. Well into its existence, Greeley would continue to call for the closing of the Free Academy and that it "should be sloughed off in the interests of retrenchment." The argument made by Harris and his supporters in response was that money drawn from what was called The Literature Fund, a state budget for public education, "ought to be apportioned on the principle of the greatest good to [the] greatest number." They believed this would be best accomplished by the Free Academy.

The Free Academy received its charter from the New York State Legislature on May 7, 1847. Construction of The Free Academy began in November 1847. Harris was succeeded as President of the Board of Education by Robert Kelley in 1848. Dr. Horace Webster, a graduate of the United States Military Academy and professor of mathematics was chosen by Kelly and his committee as the school's first principal. At the formal opening on January 21, 1849, Webster outlined the intention of the academy:

The experiment is to be tried, whether the children of the people, the children of the whole people, can be educated; and whether an institution of the highest grade, can be successfully controlled by the popular will, not by the privileged few.

The Free Academy was renamed the College of the City of New York in the immediate aftermath of the Civil War, at the behest of students who felt that the name "Academy" did not carry the same prestige in the real world as the word "College." There was an acceleration of campus activity in the years following the war, especially in the realm of student organizing and government. Richard Rodgers Bowker published the first issue of The City College Collegian in November 1866. The paper only ran for one year, but in that time played an instrumental role in calling for the formation of the first student-led academic senate in the nation.

==== Founding of Hunter College ====
The next school to be established was the Normal College, later Hunter College. Normal schools, or institutions for teacher education, were first established in New York in 1834, with schools for white men, white women, and women of color. There were inequities; the women's schools were only open on Saturdays and there was a lack of attention to teaching skills with the female curriculum limited to mathematics. The first state normal school for teacher instruction was established in Albany, New York on May 7, 1844, now the University of Albany. This was followed by the establishment of a number of other normal schools. In 1851, the state legislature sought to "amend, consolidate, and reduce to one act, the various acts relative to the Common Schools of the city of New York," and formalized a board of education for the city with the mission of continuing to "furnish through the free academy, the benefit of education, gratuitously, to persons who have been pupils in the common schools of the said city and county, for a period of time to be regulated by the board of education not less than one year." This included a mandate for the formation of new schools, including evening schools. The call for the establishment of a normal school for women in New York City was reiterated in 1854, and once more tied directly to the founding of the Free Academy just five years prior. In 1854 the state legislature amended the act of 1851 to grant the Board of Education power

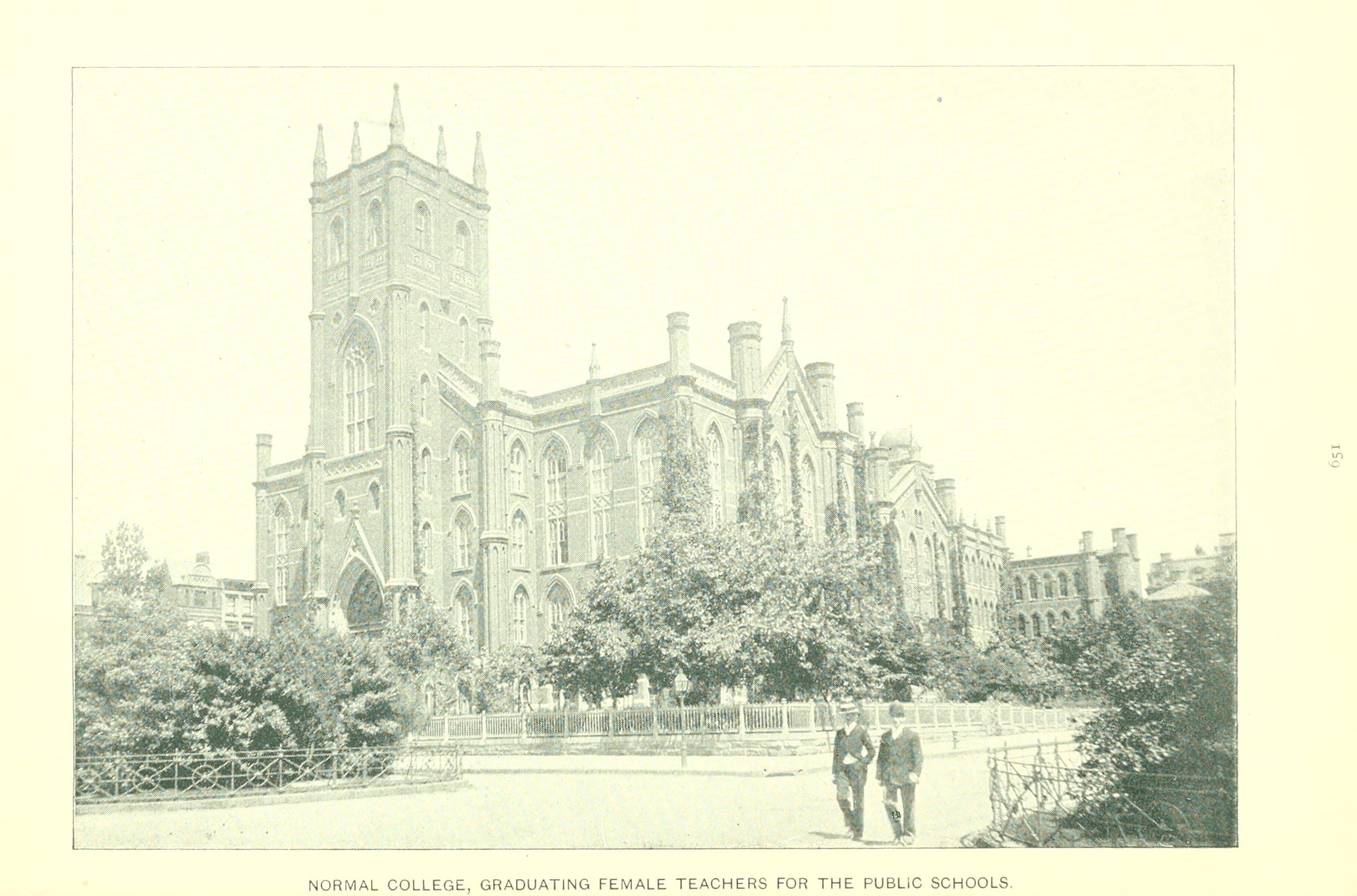
Original Hunter College campus on 68th Street and Park Avenue, circa 1895

to continue the existing Free Academy, and organize a similar institution for females, and if any similar institution is organized by the board of education, all the provisions of this act, relative to the Free Academy, shall apply to each and every one of the said institutions, as fully, completely, and distinctly as they could or would if it was the only institution of the kind.

In 1868 the Board of Education once more called for the establishment of a female institution of higher education, and on November 13, 1869, the Committee on Normal, Evening and Colored Schools adopted a resolution establishing a daily Female Normal and High School. The Female Normal and High School was opened on February 14, 1870, on the third floor of a building at the southeast corner of Broadway and Fourth Street. The school was established by Irish schoolmaster and exiled republican Thomas Hunter as a normal school, who "insisted on admitting students of all racial and ethnic backgrounds and teaching a combined curriculum of liberal arts, science, and education." The school's name was soon changed to Normal College and in September 1873 it moved into a Gothic revivalist building designed by Hunter himself, between 68th and 69th Street on Park Avenue. A broad curriculum encompassing both the humanities and the sciences was implemented, and in the following decades the school expanded its focus on teacher education, to include more academic departments and disciplines/fields.

=== 20th century ===
==== The College of the City of New York and the Normal College ====
In 1903, John Huston Finley became President of City College, succeeding Alexander Stewart Webb. In 1906, President of the Normal College Thomas Hunter retired, and the first stirrings of the merger of the colleges began. A highly debated coeducational proposal suggested a merger of the Normal College with the College of the City of New York. The Normal College opposed this measure. President Finley resigned from City College to pursue the position of commissioner of education for New York State; he later served as an associate editor of The New York Times. Finley was succeeded as City College President by American philosopher Sidney E. Mezes of the University of Texas. Prior to his departure from the college, former President Finley collaborated with philanthropist Adolph Lewisohn and architect Arnold Brunner to construct an outdoor amphitheater for City College student use. Situated on New York City Parks Department land between Convent and Amsterdam Avenues, the reinforced concrete stadium held its inaugural event on May 29, 1915, showing a performance of the play, The Trojan Women. For the next five decades, the field at Lewisohn Stadium hosted college events such as baseball, track, football, and ROTC exercises. Additionally, Lewisohn Stadium hosted a longstanding summer concert series produced by Stadium Concerts Inc., under the direction of Minnie Guggenheimer.

In 1908, George Samler Davis became the official second president of the Normal College; under his administration the college curriculum was liberalized to include electives, following the model Harvard was then introducing. The Interborough Rapid Transit Company was also persuaded by President Davis to complete the first section of the Lexington Avenue station at 68th Street, making the Normal College more accessible for students commuting from distant parts of the city. Late in his career, he also laid the groundwork for a new site in the Bronx. Under the leadership of George Samler Davis, the Normal College would be renamed Hunter College to honor its founder. It also served to clarify the nature of its mission; formerly, its name implied that it was a technical or professional school, but as early as 1888 it had granted degrees and diplomas in the arts. The school was constantly expanding, and the increased number of students and issues of overcrowding led to the creation of a Board of Trustees in 1915, a major act in the history of education in New York.

Formation of the Board of Higher Education and the founding of Brooklyn College

There had been intimations of a free university in Brooklyn since the dawn of the 20th century. As early as 1905, Brooklyn Controller Edward M. Grout proposed the formation of a free public university in Brooklyn. The suggestion was to merge all of the various private institutions, and to follow the model provided by the success of City College and the Normal College. A large factor in the push for a Brooklyn school was the distance of the schools, rendering attendance "practically prohibitive" to residents of Brooklyn and Queens. Grout was quoted in the New York Times:

What I propose is that we unite in asking of the Legislature an act to authorize a public university in Brooklyn, the Trustees to be appointed by the Mayor, with authority to the city by its Board of Estimate and Apportionment to locate its site in these east side lands or to provide another site, if the city so chooses, and also to make such appropriation as the Board of Estimate may see fit for buildings and maintenance, and with authority to make agreements of consolidation with such other educational institutions as may be willing and as the Board of Estimate may approve.

In 1909, City College opened a teacher extension program in Brooklyn, and by 1917 they had created an evening program in Brooklyn. A 1923 bill introduced by Assemblyman Joseph Reich called for the establishment of a free public college in Brooklyn, but this did not pass the legislature. One year later, President George Samler Davis of Hunter College was quoted in The New York Times announcing that the Board of Trustees had "authorized the establishment of a Brooklyn Branch of the evening sessions of the college in the Girls' Commercial High School Building, Classon Avenue and Union Street." These developments stirred resentment among Brooklyn's political leaders, leading Borough President Joseph A. Guider to request funds from the New York State Assembly for the establishment of a university in Prospect Park. Through debates over governance structure between proposals by the Brooklyn Chamber of Commerce and proposals coming from Manhattan, a Board of Higher Education governing New York public colleges was formed in the passage of the Nicoll-Hearn Bill signed into law by Governor Al Smith in April 1926. Moses J. Stroock was named the board's first chairman. This bill also charged the board with the formation of a public college in the most populous district in Brooklyn. Following the passage of the Nicoll-Hearn Bill in 1926, the board approved the opening of new City College and Hunter College branches in downtown Brooklyn. Four years later, Brooklyn College emerged from the merger of these Brooklyn annexes. The school operated out of a rented office space in downtown Brooklyn before the school's first president, William Boylan, at the proposal of architect Randolph Evans, settled on an undeveloped track of land in Midwood. On October 2, 1935, Mayor Fiorello La Guardia broke ground on the new campus. Franklin D. Roosevelt would lay the last stone.

==== Rapp-Coudert Committee and the anti-war movement ====
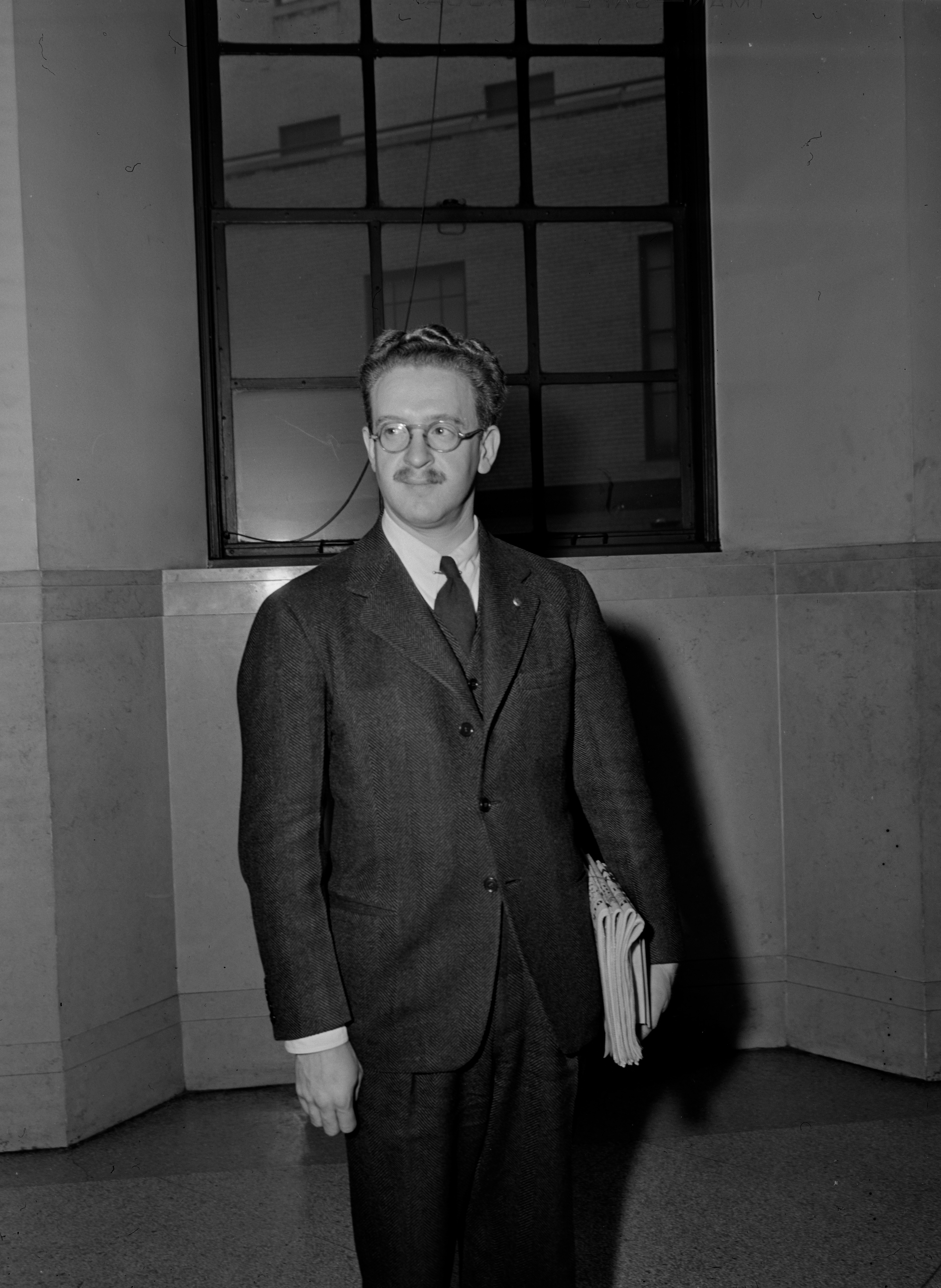
English lecturer at City College Morris Schappes in court March 1941. Schappes was one of over forty professors fired as a result of the Rapp-Coudert Committee investigations.

Beginning at the end of the 19th century and into the 20th century, a wave of Jewish refugees would transform the social and political life of City College. As historian Conor Tomás Reed writes, "Jewish students from some of the most impoverished refugee families in the US flocked to City College to obtain a free college education. Over time, they turned the college into a hotbed of antifascism." During the post-World War I era as some Ivy League universities such as Yale and Columbia placed harsh quotas on the number of Jewish students admitted, City College stood out for its working-class intellectual life. The City College of New York developed a reputation of being "the Harvard of the proletariat" and a "Citadel on a Hill," a home for radical argumentation among those shut out of elite universities. Early forms of student activism targeted compulsory military training on campus, and succeeded in having it eliminated in 1926. There are a number of accounts documenting the alcoves in the cafeteria as sites of political debate. However, Frederick B. Robinson, president of City College from 1927 to 1939, was a harsh disciplinarian who participated in the intense repression of these forms of student activism. This would develop over the course of the 1930s in the suspension of students, the dismissal of professors, and willful compliance with the anti-Communist Rapp-Coudert Committee. Responding to the 1935 Teachers Union election that brought Communists into greater control as a part of the rank-and-file, the Committee sought to purge professors with alleged Communist affiliations from the universities. This culminated in the firing of over fifty professors, the largest political purge of faculty in America. This committee was based upon the House Un-American Activities Committee, and would itself serve as a model for future anti-communist investigations.

There are many examples of student protest at the different municipal universities through the 1930s. On April 13, 1934, City and Hunter Colleges were sites of the first National Student Strike Against War, organized by the Student League for Industrial Democracy and the National Student League. At City College, approximately 600 students gathered at the flagpole on campus to protest the war, as well as demand the reinstatement of twenty-one students who had been expelled for refusing to answer Dean Morton Gottschall's questions regarding their actions in a prior protest against a visiting delegation of soldiers from fascist Italy on October 9. In April 1934, students at Hunter College demonstrated against then-president Dr. Eugene A. Colligan for his refusal to cooperate with the nationwide anti-war strike "and especially his attempt to call a halt to an anti-war convention at Hunter College on mere technicalities." On November 20, 1934, nearly 1,500 gathered at the CCNY Quad to protest the expulsion, culminating in the burning of a two-headed effigy of CCNY President Robinson and Italian Prime Minister Benito Mussolini. After the rally, more than 2,000 City College students voted to reinstate the twenty-one students, this time advocating for "a 'legal method' of struggle...as opposed to the holding of unauthorized demonstrations."

Brooklyn College was also referred to as a "hotbed of Communism" in the era of the Red Scare. Republican representative J. Parnell Thomas, a member of the Dies Committee, stated that he believed "25 per cent of the pupils in Brooklyn College, which is part of the City College of New York, are either affiliated with or sympathetic to the Communist party and that 33 per cent of the professors of Brooklyn College are just as sympathetic as the students." In the words of Brooklyn College archivist Marianna Labatto, President Harry Gideonse, who served from 1939 to 1966, believed that if academia did not provide moral, social, as well as intellectual guidance, "the void would be filled by popular culture and totalitarian regimes." This led to the creation of committees to oversee student activities and thus deter from Communist influence. The work of the Faculty-Student Committee on Student Groups and Organizations led to the prevention of leader of the Communist Party USA, Earl Browder, from speaking to the Karl Marx Society of Brooklyn College in 1939. It also suppressed student publications through suspensions and the revocation of charters.

==== Founding of Queens College ====
With an 111,360-citizen alliance, County Judge Charles S. Colden appointed the Committee for a Queens Free College to study the possibility of establishing a free college in Queens on the site of the former New York Parental School for Boys. On December 25, 1936, Mayor LaGuardia agreed to establish the school. In 1937, the Queens branches of City College and Hunter College merged, creating Queens College. Dr. Paul Klapper, at the time the Dean of the School of Education at City College, was elected the school's first president. Klapper was thrilled by the potentials of the college, and would refer to the school as "the people's college on the hill." In an interview with the New York Times that was published upon his election, May 26, 1937, he stated:

‘Many have been called to the leadership of institutions of higher learning in America, but to me there has come an opportunity unique in its richness: to help in the building of a great institution, to assemble its staff of teachers and scholars, to formulate its sphere of influence. We must build not another college but a new college, an institution whose identity stems from its distinctive aim and its distinctive staff. We must build more than a college for young people; we must develop a great cultural center for the Borough of Queens.’

==== Community college expansion and the founding of CUNY ====
Demand in the United States for higher education rapidly grew after World War II, and during the mid-1940s a movement began to create community colleges to provide accessible education and training. The State of New York began to study postwar educational needs as early as 1940, with a plan by the State's Board of Regents to establish twenty-two new two year colleges, with eleven poised to be in New York City. In 1944, a report by the New York Adult Education Council and another by the Rapp-Coudert committee's survey staff, called for increased attention to adult education in New York. 270,000 full-time students were newly enrolled in New York State schools in wave of veterans returning from World War II hoping to take advantage of the GI Bill. Beginning in 1946, pressure was applied to Governor Thomas E. Dewey to establish a state university. As historian writes:

The principal arguments advanced in support of a public university were three: the general shortage of college facilities in the State; the special need to provide spaces for large numbers of returning war veterans; and growing evidence of discriminatory admission policies among the private institutions, especially the medical schools.

The American Jewish Congress and American Jewish Committee had advocated for the Board of Regents to study admissions discrimination in institutions of higher education. In response, a Temporary Commission on the Need for a State University was forged, bringing together Jewish, Black, labor and legislative interests. The Commission published a report in 1948 entitled "Inequality of Opportunity in Higher Education: A Study of Minority Group and Related Barriers to College Admission" which was to guide the development of New York City community colleges. However, the community college movement was constrained by many factors including "financial problems, narrow perceptions of responsibility, organizational weaknesses, adverse political factors, and other competing priorities." Community colleges would have drawn from the same city coffers that were funding the senior colleges, and city higher education officials believed that the state should finance them. A 1948 state law required student tuition to be implemented at community colleges. Additionally, the municipal public colleges offered two-year and certificate programs in some subjects, thus rendering the need for the development of community colleges less urgent. The State of New York had also already opened technical institutes in the city; the New York State Institute of Applied Arts and Sciences had been established in 1946 in downtown Brooklyn, and it was not until the end of the 1950s that the Board of Education authorized the establishment of three of its own community colleges. These were to become the Staten Island Community College (later College of Staten Island) in 1956, Bronx Community College in 1957, and Queensborough Community College in 1960.

The State University of New York (SUNY) was significantly expanded under Governor Nelson Rockefeller. In 1959, Rockefeller formed the Heald Commission, chaired by President of the Ford Foundation, Henry T. Heald, to

review the higher education needs and facilities in New York State and to make recommendations on the steps that the State could take to:

(1) assure educational opportunities to those qualified for college study;

(2) provide the undergraduate, graduate and professional training and research facilities necessary for the continued development of the State as a leading business, industrial, scientific and cultural center; and

(3) contribute its proper share of trained personnel to meet the nation's needs for education, health and welfare services

The report recommended the "expansion of the SUNY system as well as public aid to private colleges, increased student scholarships, and an end to the tuition-free policy in New York City's municipal colleges." In April 1961, Rockefeller signed an amendment to the New York State Education Law formally establishing the City University of New York. This legislation followed some of the Heald Committee's recommendations, ending the state's free tuition mandate. The legislation integrated the four senior colleges and three community colleges, as well as a new Division of Graduate Studies, into a coordinated system of higher education for the city under the control of the Board of Higher Education of the City of New York.

In 1962, the Board of Higher Education commissioned "A Long-Range Plan for the City University of New York, 1961-1975," a study of the university and a set of recommendations for its future. This report called for the Board to "reaffirm its support of the policy of free tuition for resident matriculated baccalaureate students which has been maintained for 115 years," and recommended that this policy be extended to the community colleges. It called for the crafting of more generous admissions requirements to expand enrollment, as well as the expansion of the university's facilities to accommodate this expansion. In the following years, a number of new community and senior colleges were founded. In 1964, both the Borough of Manhattan Community College and Kingsborough Community College were established. The school also integrated the New York City Community College (later the NYC College of Technology), and the College of Police Science (COPS), later renamed John Jay College of Criminal Justice, was founded with the idea that "police should be educated to better deal with the social and political issues of the time period."

==== College Discovery and SEEK ====
Albert H. Bowker was named CUNY chancellor in 1963. He was "struck by CUNY's unresponsiveness to the burgeoning college-age population and to the changed ethnic composition of the city," and argued for a major expansion of the public university system. He was a major advocate for the policy of "open admissions," which would guarantee every NYC high-school graduate a spot at the university. In the coming years, two remedial programs were created to assist students underprepared for college level work. The College Discovery admissions program was established for the community colleges in 1964, and SEEK (Search for Education, Elevation, and Knowledge) in 1966. These programs were instrumental in the struggle for an accessible and diverse university system, and "within a few years, SEEK would become a nucleus for experimental study that challenged the institutional inequalities entrenched in City College's admissions, curriculum, and relationship to Harlem."

==== Civil rights and the struggle for open admissions ====
Calls for greater access to public higher education from the Black and Puerto Rican communities in New York, especially in Brooklyn, led to the founding of "Community College Number 7 (later Medgar Evers College) in 1966–1967. Hostos Community College was also forged through this same form of activism in 1968. At Baruch College in 1967, over a thousand students protested the plan to make the college an upper-division school limited to junior, senior, and graduate students. Also in 1967, the Bronx campus of Hunter College was changed to Lehman College and entered as one of CUNY's senior undergraduate colleges. The first senior college founded under the CUNY system was York College, established in 1967 in Jamaica, Queens. At Brooklyn College in 1968, students attempted a sit-in to demand the admission of more black and Puerto Rican students and additional Black Studies curriculum. Students at Hunter College also demanded a Black Studies program. Members of the SEEK program, which provided academic support for underprepared and underprivileged students, staged a building takeover at Queens College in 1969 to protest the decisions of the program's director, who would later be replaced by a Black professor.

In 1969, a group of black and Puerto Rican students occupied City College and demanded the racial integration of CUNY, which at the time had an overwhelmingly white student body. The desires of minority students were succinctly detailed in a list of five demands issued by the Committee of Ten, a coalition of black and Puerto Rican students at City College:

1. A separate school of black and Puerto Rican studies
2. A separate orientation program for black and Puerto Rican freshmen
3. A voice for students in the setting of guidelines for the SEEK program, including the hiring and firing of personnel.
4. That the racial composition of all entering classes reflect the black and Puerto Rican population of the New York City high schools.
5. That black and Puerto Rican history and the Spanish language be a requirement for all education majors.

In 1969, students and faculty across CUNY participated in rallies, student strikes, and class boycotts demanding an end to CUNY's restrictive admissions policies. Puerto Rican students at Bronx Community College filed a report with the New York State Division of Human Rights in 1970, contending that the intellectual level of the college was inferior and discriminatory. Hunter College was crippled for several days by a protest of 2,000 students who had a list of demands focusing on more student representation in college administration. Across CUNY, students boycotted their campuses in 1970 to protest a rise in student fees and other issues, including the proposed (and later implemented) open admissions plan. CUNY administrators and Mayor John Lindsay expressed support for these demands, and the Board of Higher Education (BHE) voted to implement the plan immediately in the fall of 1970. All high school graduates were guaranteed entrance to the university without having to fulfill traditional requirements such as exams or grades. The policy nearly doubled the number of students enrolled in the CUNY system to 35,000 (compared to 20,000 the year before). Black and Hispanic student enrollment increased threefold. Remedial education, to supplement the training of under-prepared students, became a significant part of CUNY's offerings. Additionally, ethnic and Black Studies programs and centers were instituted on many CUNY campuses, contributing to the growth of similar programs nationwide. Retention of students in CUNY during this period was low; two-thirds of students enrolled in the early 1970s left within four years without graduating.

In 1970, LaGuardia Community College was founded in Long Island City, Queens with a focus on cooperative education.

==== CUNY in the 1970s: student protests and the introduction of tuition ====
Like many college campuses in 1970, CUNY faced a number of protests and demonstrations after the Kent State shootings and Cambodian Campaign. The Administrative Council of the City University of New York sent President Richard Nixon a telegram in 1970 stating, "No nation can long endure the alienation of the best of its young people." Some colleges, including John Jay College of Criminal Justice, historically the "college for cops," held teach-ins in addition to student and faculty protests.

In fall 1976, during New York City's fiscal crisis, the free tuition policy was discontinued under pressure from the federal government, the financial community that had a role in rescuing the city from bankruptcy, and New York State, which would take over the funding of CUNY's senior colleges. Tuition, which had been in place in the State University of New York system since 1963, was instituted at all CUNY colleges.

Meanwhile, CUNY students were added to the state's need-based Tuition Assistance Program (TAP), which had been created to help private colleges. Full-time students who met the income eligibility criteria were permitted to receive TAP funding, ensuring for the first time that financial hardship would deprive no CUNY student of a college education. Within a few years, the federal government would create its own need-based program, known as Pell Grants, providing the neediest students with a tuition-free college education.

==== Founding of CUNY School of Law ====
In 1981 Charles Halpern, a founder of one of the nation's first public interest law firms, was hired by CUNY as the founding dean of a planned law school. CUNY School of Law opened in 1983 as The CUNY Law School at Queens College. The goal of CUNY Law was to provide a "new direction for teaching law" with a focus on public interest law, and on the education of students who may not traditionally have had access to law school.

CUNY Law moved from their original location in Flushing to 2 Court Square in Long Island City at the end of May 2012. It remains the only publicly funded law school in New York City.

==== Austerity and the end of open admissions ====
Joseph S. Murphy was Chancellor of the City University of New York from 1982 to 1990. CUNY at the time was the third-largest university in the United States, with over 180,000 students. CUNY's enrollment dipped after tuition was re-established, and there were further enrollment declines through the 1980s and into the 1990s.

In 1995, CUNY suffered another fiscal crisis when Governor George Pataki proposed a cut in state financing. He also called for a $500 tuition increase and an end to SEEK and College Discovery. In response, faculty cancelled classes and students staged protests. On March 23, 1995, thousands of New York City public school and CUNY students joined a march to City Hall organized by the CUNY Coalition Against the Cuts. The organizers claimed that this was the "largest student demonstration since Vietnam." The New York Times covered the protest: "sixty people, mostly students, were arrested, and 16, including 11 police offices were injured. All of the injuries were minor, the police said." Despite student efforts, by May, CUNY was forced to adopt deep cuts to college budgets and class offerings. By June, to save money spent on remedial programs, CUNY adopted a stricter admissions policy for its senior colleges; students deemed unable to complete necessary remedial work by the end of their freshman year would not be admitted, a major departure from the 1970 Open Admissions program. That year's final state budget cut funding by $102 million, which CUNY absorbed by increasing tuition by $750 and offering a retirement incentive plan for faculty. The Student Liberation Action Movement (SLAM!) was an organization that branched out from the CUNY Coalition.

In 1999, a task force appointed by Mayor Rudolph Giuliani issued a report that described CUNY as "an institution adrift" and called for an improved, more cohesive university structure and management, as well as more consistent academic standards. Following the report, Matthew Goldstein, a mathematician and City College graduate who had led CUNY's Baruch College and briefly, Adelphi University, was appointed chancellor. CUNY ended its policy of open admissions to its four-year colleges, raised its admissions standards at its most selective four-year colleges (Baruch, Brooklyn, City, Hunter and Queens), and required new enrollees who needed remediation to begin their studies at a CUNY open-admissions community college.

=== 21st century ===
==== 2000-2010: The rapid expansion and centralization of CUNY ====
In response to the sweeping administrative actions called for in the “An Institution Adrift” report, the first decade of the 21st century was defined by rising institutional tensions created by exponential growth in CUNY's student enrollment, private fundraising campaigns, and program options under Chancellor Goldstein's direction. CUNY's enrollment of degree-credit students reached 220,727 in 2005 and 262,321 in 2010 as the university broadened its academic offerings. The university added more than 2,000 full-time faculty positions, opened new schools and programs, and expanded the university's fundraising efforts to help pay for them. PSC CUNY elected a “New Caucus” of progressive officers in 2000, replacing leadership that many rank-and-file organizers believed had not done enough to challenge austerity measures ushered in during the previous decade. Despite faculty and staff resistance to the rapid expansion of the university system and the high costs that came with it, the strain on CUNY's financial and personnel resources was only exacerbated by the Great Recession of 2008.

By 2011, nearly six of ten full-time undergraduates qualified for a tuition-free education at CUNY due in large measure to state, federal and CUNY financial aid programs. Fundraising increased from $35 million in 2000 to more than $200 million in 2012.

By autumn 2013, all CUNY undergraduates were required to take a common core of courses deemed to meet specific "learning outcomes" or standards. Since the courses are accepted university-wide, the administration claims it will be easier for students to transfer course credits between CUNY colleges. It also reduced the number of core courses some CUNY colleges had required, to a level below national norms, particularly in the sciences. The program was the target of several lawsuits by students and faculty, and was the subject of a "no confidence" vote by the faculty, who rejected it by an overwhelming 92% margin.

Chancellor Goldstein retired on July 1, 2013, and was replaced on June 1, 2014, by James Milliken, president of the University of Nebraska, and a graduate of the University of Nebraska–Lincoln and New York University School of Law. Milliken left at the end of the 2018 academic year and moved on to become the chancellor for the University of Texas system.

On February 13, 2019, the Board of Trustees voted to appoint Queens College president Felix V. Matos Rodriguez as the chancellor of the City University of New York. Matos became both the first Latino and minority educator to head the university. He assumed the post May 1.

In April 2024, CUNY students joined other campuses across the United States in protests against the Israel–Hamas war. The student protestors demanded that CUNY divest from companies with ties to Israel and that CUNY officials cancel any upcoming trips to Israel and protect students involved in the demonstrations. In 2025, CUNY terminated four adjunct professors and suspended one student leader for their pro-Palestinian activism. After a two-year-long legal battle, CUNY disclosed its 2025 holdings report, which showed the university system invested in U.S. military and defense contractors, Israel's arms manufacturer, Elbit Systems, and private prison companies.

==== Schools founded in the 21st century ====
Conceptualized during Chancellor Goldstein's incumbency and approved by CUNY's Board of Trustees in 1999, the first CUNY Honors College was established in 2001. This senior honors college was renamed the William E. Macaulay Honors College in 2006 after a $30 million donation made by the late William E. Macaulay (Baruch School of Business at City College, class of 1966) and his wife Linda. The Macaulay endowment permitted CUNY's honors program to provide each of its students with four-year full-tuition merit scholarships, funded research projects and study abroad programs, and purchased a new building located at 35 W. 67th Street which opened its doors in April 2008. Eight senior CUNY colleges serve as "home campuses" for Macaulay Honors students, including Baruch College, Brooklyn College, City College, Hunter College, John Jay College, Lehman College, Queens College, and College of Staten Island.

In June 2003, Neil Kleiman, then-director of the Center for an Urban Future, addressed the Board of Trustees of the City University of New York detailing the need for creating the CUNY School of Professional Studies (CUNY SPS). CUNY SPS is a senior college that seeks to meet the educational needs of working adults. In 2013, CUNY SPS opened its principal campus in midtown Manhattan, at the former site of the Gimbels department store. In 2022 CUNY SPS was the forerunner of a CUNY initiative to provide excellence in online education.

The Craig Newmark Graduate School of Journalism at the City University of New York opened in 2006 as the CUNY Graduate School of Journalism. The school opened with the mission of expanding diversity in newsrooms across the nation and providing an affordable, publicly supported graduate journalism school in the New York region. It is the only public graduate school of journalism in the northeastern United States.

Guttman Community College was founded September 11, 2011, opening in 2012 as the New Community College.

In 2016 the Graduate School of Public Health and Health Policy was opened with the goal of centralizing CUNY's existing Public Health Programs. Students and faculty transferred to this new school from CUNY's existing Public Health programs at Brooklyn College, Lehman College, Hunter College and the CUNY Graduate Center.

In 2018, CUNY opened its 25th campus, the CUNY School of Labor and Urban Studies, named after former president Joseph S. Murphy and combining some forms and functions of the Murphy Institute that were housed at the CUNY School of Professional Studies.

On November 19, 2024, the School of Medicine was established as the 26th CUNY campus, separating it from the scope of City College of New York.

On July 1, 2025, Governor Kathy Hochul signed into effect a free community college program for SUNY and CUNY students. The program is an expansion of the CUNY Reconnect initiative, a program allowing for "New York residents ages 25-55 with no prior degree" to earn "a tuition-free associate degree in high-demand fields."

==== Reaction to pro-Palestinian movement ====
Four adjunct professors, two of whom taught at Brooklyn College and were active on the campus Palestine movement, were fired under Chancellor Félix Matos Rodríguez in June 2025. Chancellor Rodríguez cited the teachers violated the institution's "policy on antisemitism." One teacher said "I'm Jewish. I'm not engaged in antisemitic acts. I'm engaged in protest against genocide." A rally in support of the four on July 31, 2025 drew 150 staff, faculty, local politicians and other supporters in the rain.

== Enrollment and demographics ==
More than 271,000-degree-credit students, continuing, and professional education students are enrolled at campuses located in all five New York City boroughs.

The university has one of the most diverse student bodies in the United States, with students hailing from around the world, although most students live in New York City. The black, white and Hispanic undergraduate populations each comprise more than a quarter of the student body, and Asian undergraduates make up 18 percent. Fifty-eight percent are female, and 28 percent are 25 or older. In the 2017–2018 award year, 144,380 CUNY students received the Federal Pell Grant.

== Academics ==
Academic rankings

Global
- QS: =613

== Component institutions ==
Location of CUNY campuses within New York City.
Black: senior colleges; Red: graduate and professional schools; Yellow: community colleges.

CUNY component institutions
Est.	Type	Name
1847	Senior college	City College
1870	Senior college	Hunter College
1919	Senior college	Baruch College
1930	Senior college	Brooklyn College
1937	Senior college	Queens College
1946	Senior college	New York City College of Technology
1964	Senior college	John Jay College of Criminal Justice
1966	Senior college	York College
1968	Senior college	Lehman College
1970	Senior college	Medgar Evers College
1976	Senior college	College of Staten Island
2001	Honors college	William E. Macaulay Honors College
1957	Community college	Bronx Community College
1958	Community college	Queensborough Community College
1963	Community college	Borough of Manhattan Community College
1963	Community college	Kingsborough Community College
1968	Community college	LaGuardia Community College
1970	Community college	Hostos Community College
2011	Community college	Guttman Community College
1961	Graduate / professional	CUNY Graduate Center
1973	Graduate / professional	CUNY School of Medicine
1983	Graduate / professional	CUNY School of Law
2006	Graduate / professional	CUNY Graduate School of Journalism
2006	Graduate / professional	CUNY School of Professional Studies
2008	Graduate / professional	CUNY School of Public Health
2018	Graduate / professional	CUNY School of Labor and Urban Studies

== Management structure ==
Seal of the CUNY Board of Trustees

Today, the City University is governed by the board of trustees composed of 17 members, ten of whom are appointed by the governor of New York "with the advice and consent of the senate," and five by the mayor of New York City "with the advice and consent of the senate." The final two trustees are ex officio members. One is the chair of the university's student senate, and the other is non-voting and is the chair of the university's faculty senate. Both the mayoral and gubernatorial appointments to the CUNY Board are required to include at least one resident of each of New York City's five boroughs. Trustees serve seven-year terms, which are renewable for another seven years. The chancellor is elected by the board of trustees, and is the "chief educational and administrative officer" of the City University.

The administrative offices are in Midtown Manhattan.

== Faculty ==
CUNY employs 6,700 full-time faculty members and over 10,000 adjunct faculty members. Faculty and staff are represented by the Professional Staff Congress (PSC), a labor union and chapter of the American Federation of Teachers.

=== Notable faculty ===
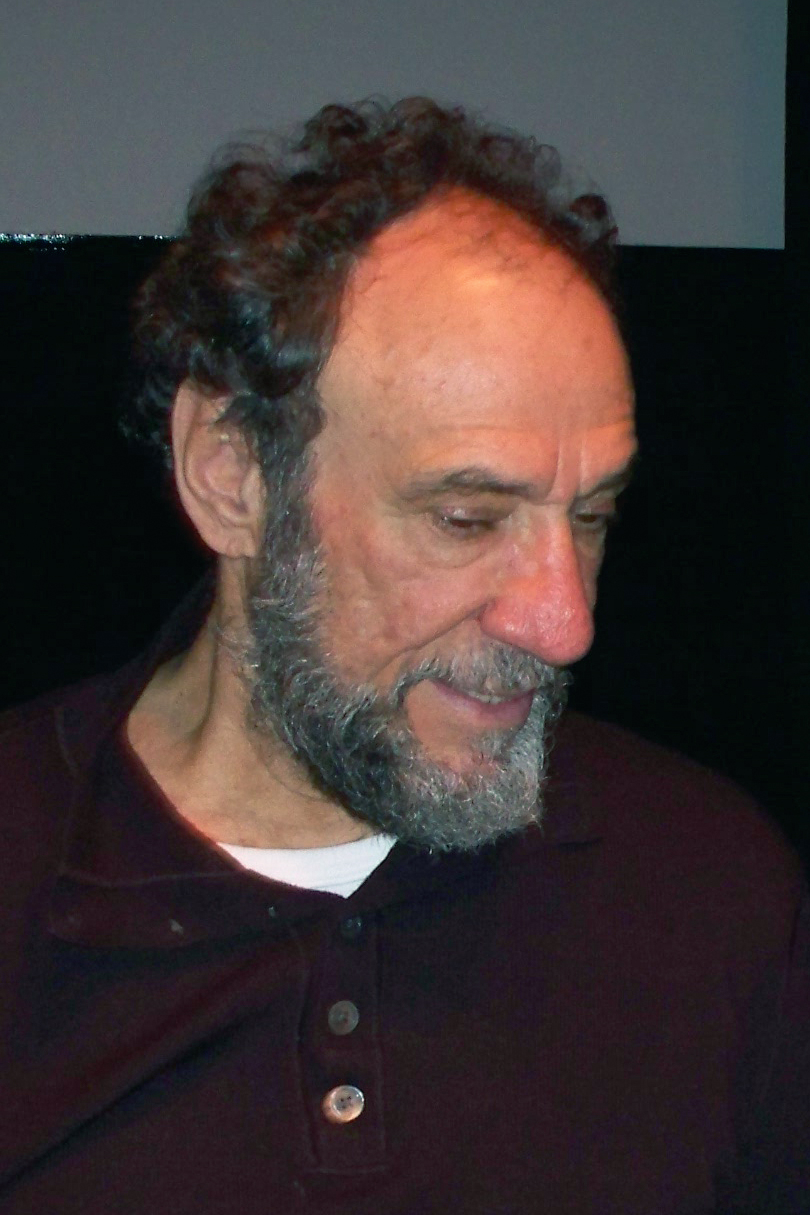
F. Murray Abraham

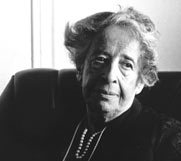
Hannah Arendt

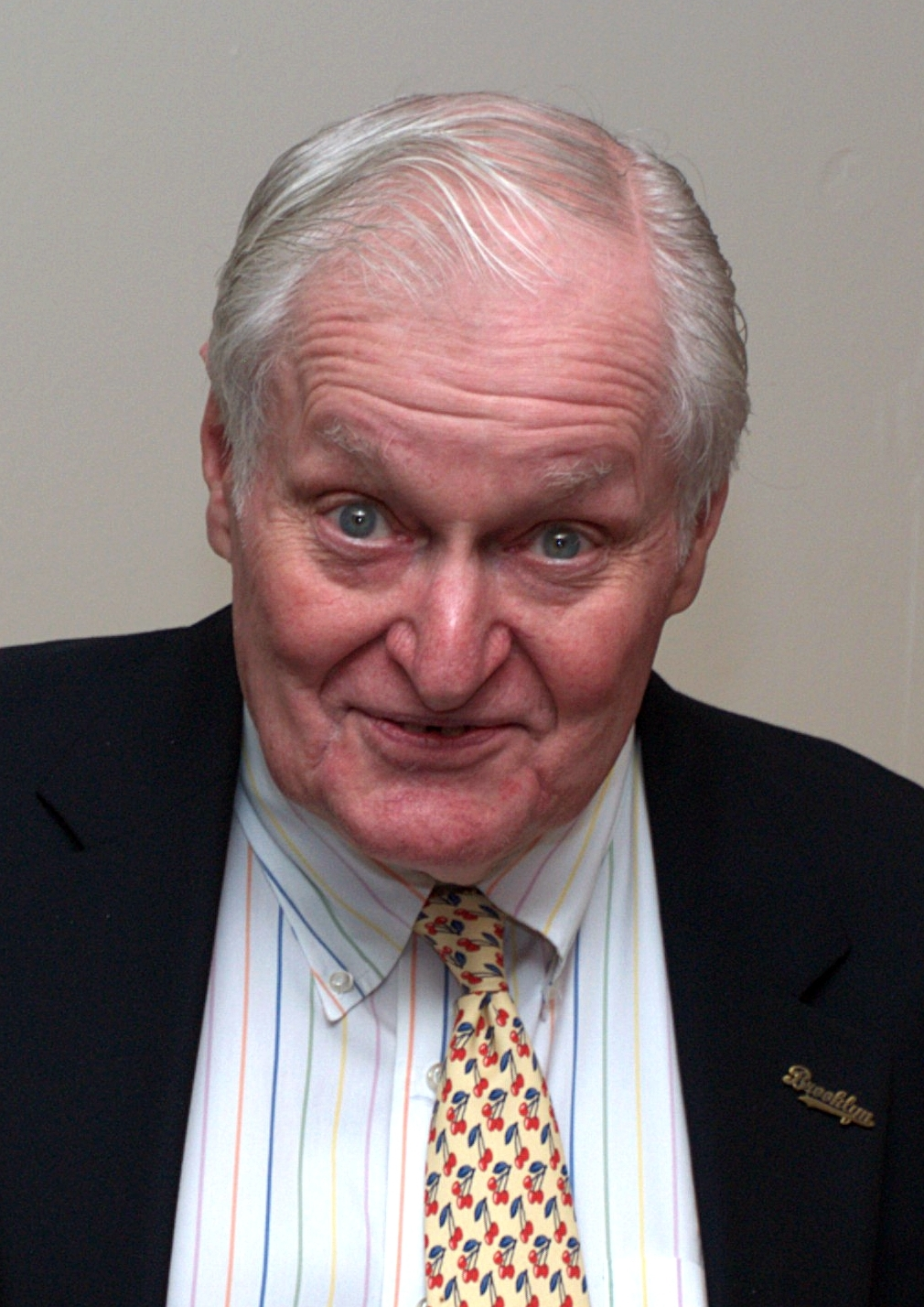
John Ashbery

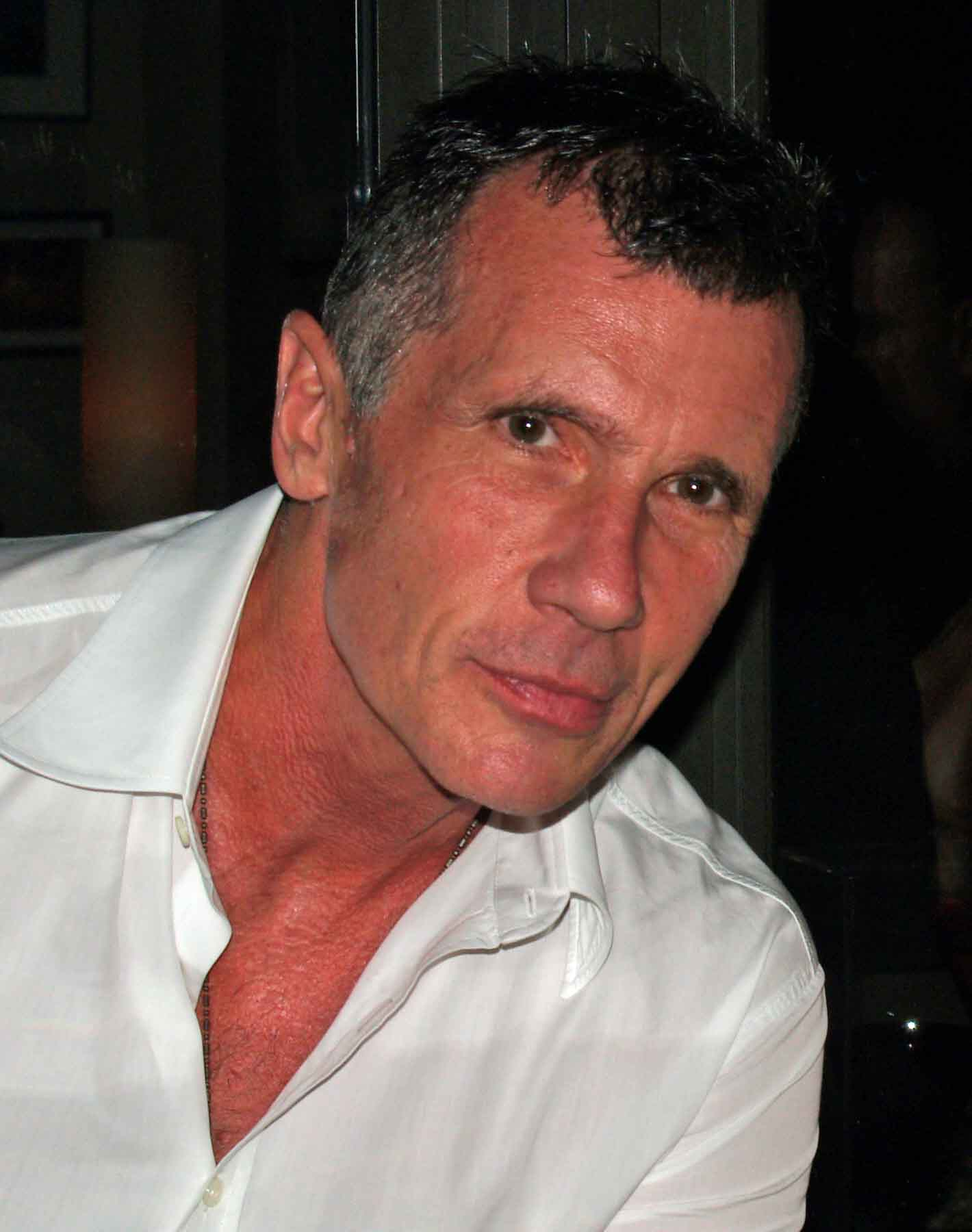
Michael Cunningham

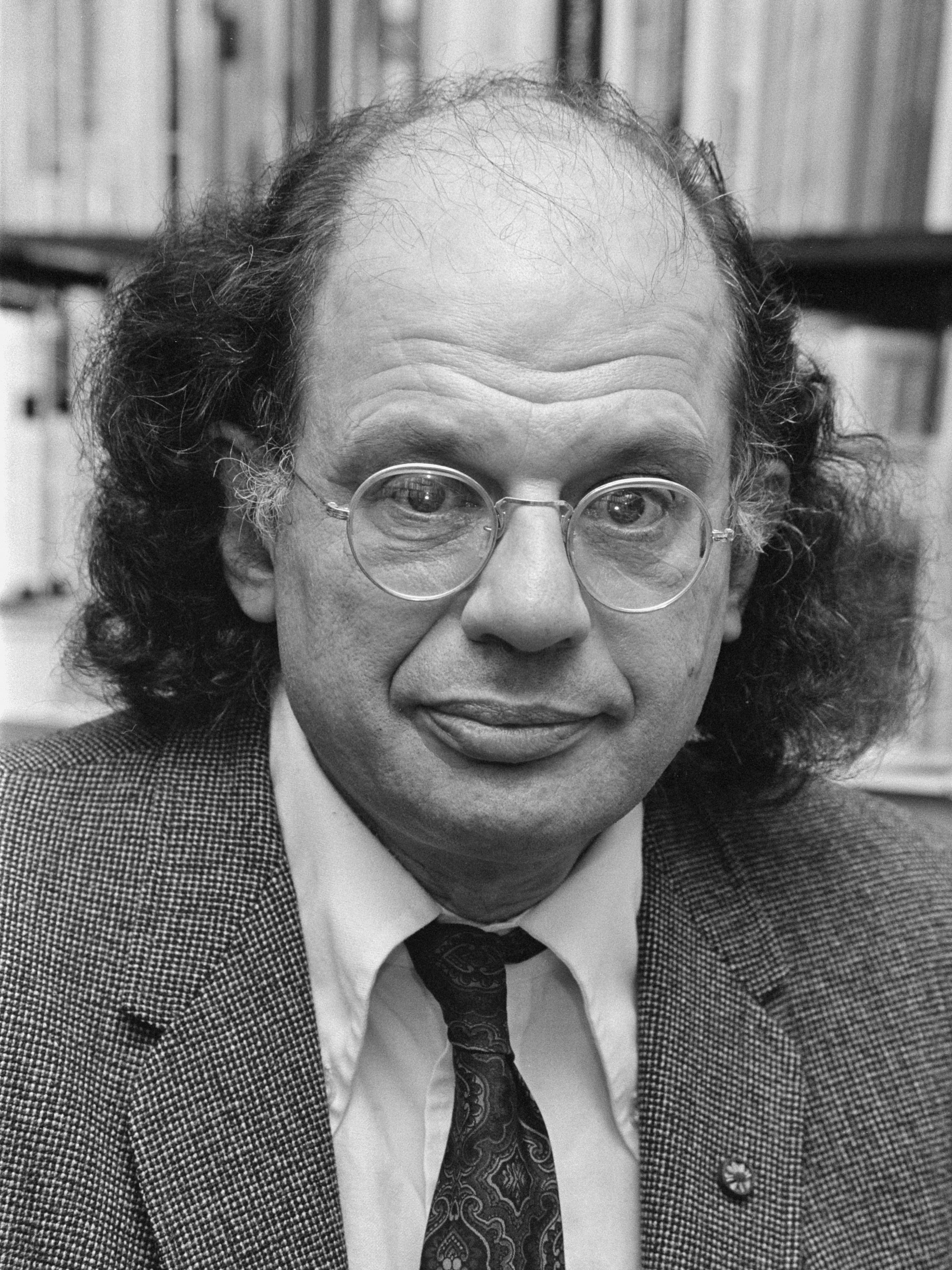
Allen Ginsberg

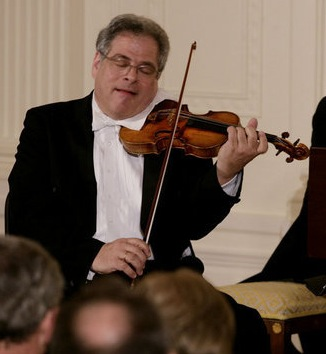
Itzhak Perlman

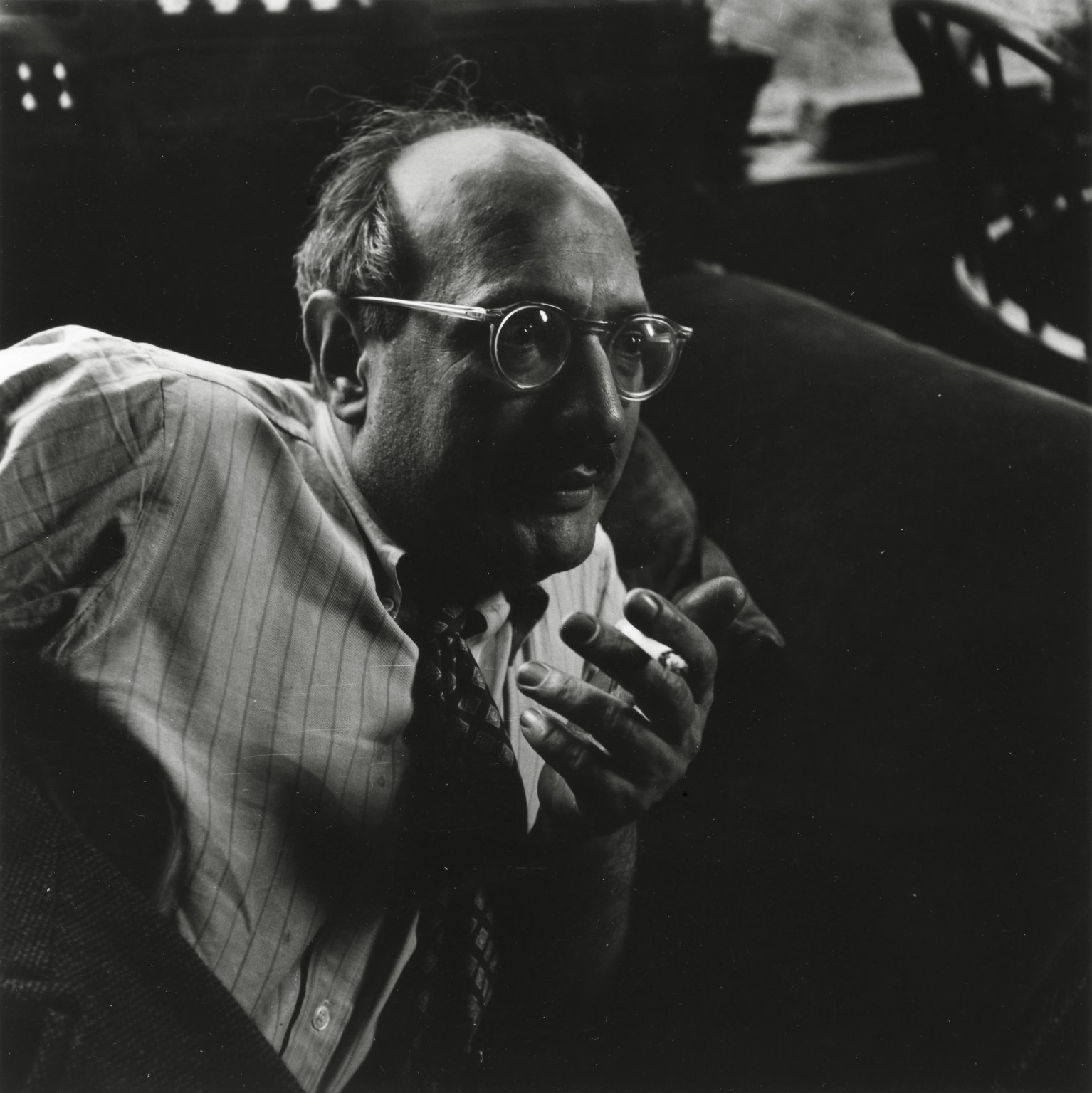
Mark Rothko

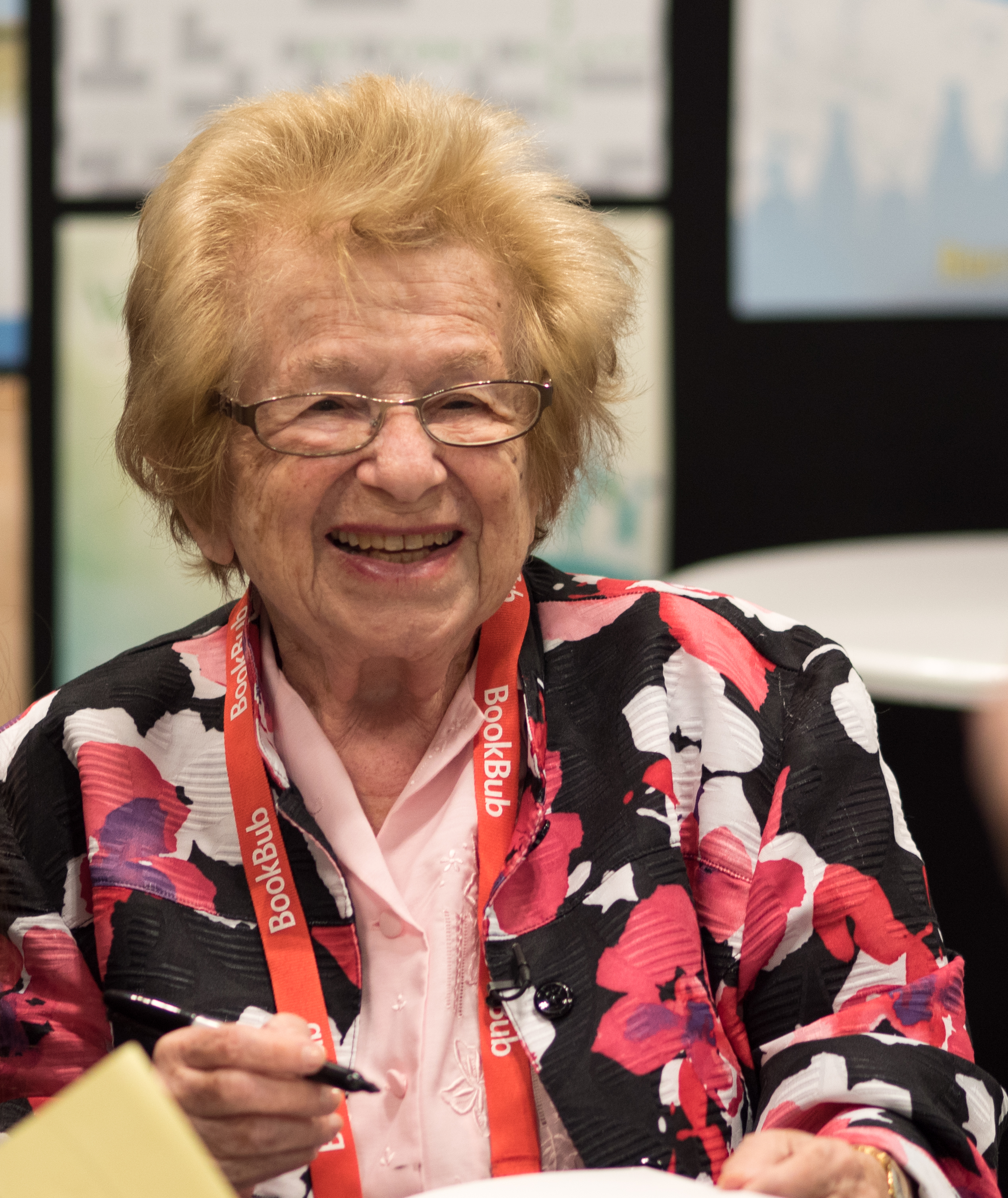
Dr. Ruth

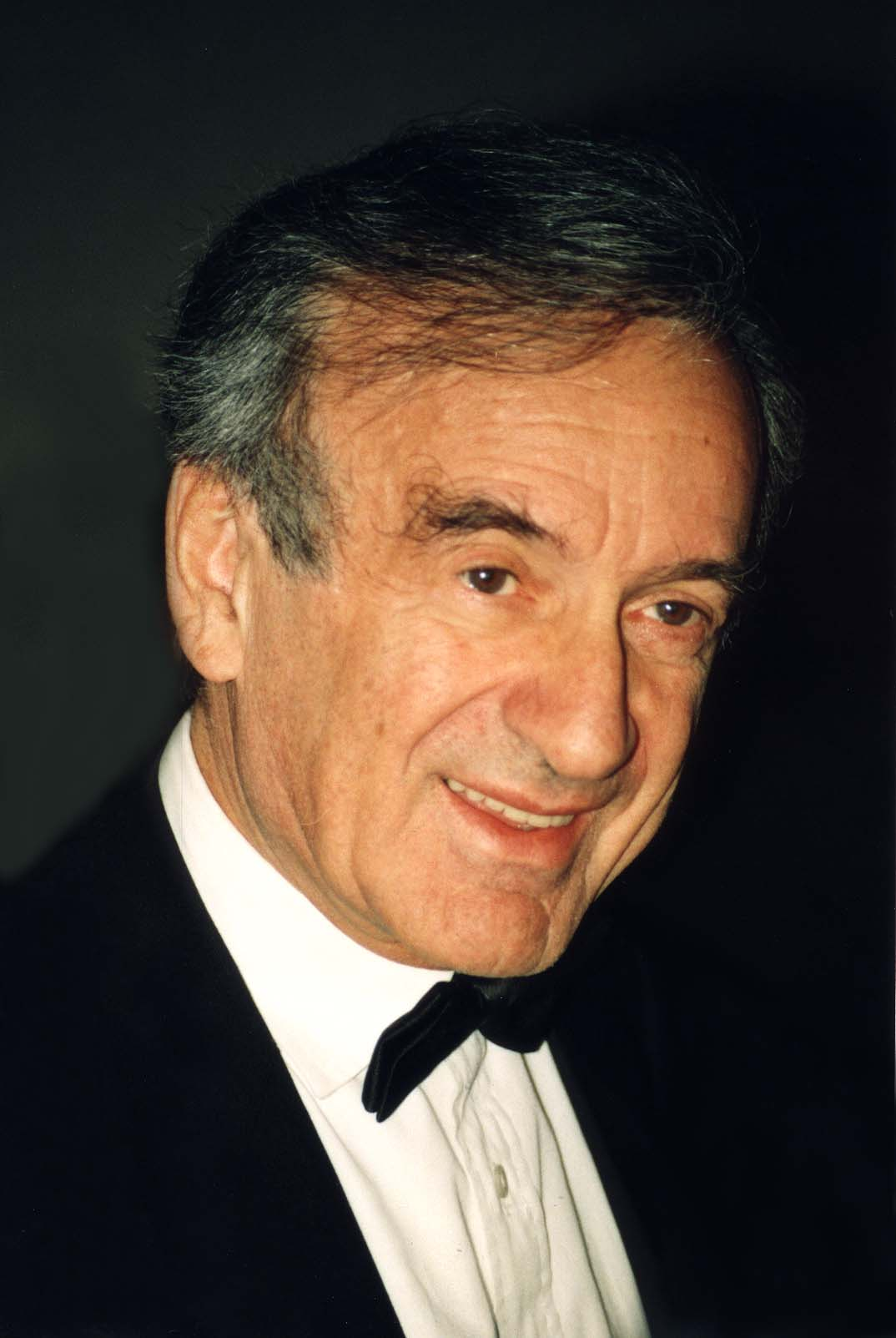
Elie Wiesel

- F. Murray Abraham, actor of stage and screen; professor of theater, winner of the Academy Award for Best Actor, Brooklyn College
- André Aciman, writer, Graduate Center
- Ali Jimale Ahmed, poet and professor of Comparative Literature, Queens College and Graduate Center
- Chantal Akerman, film director, City College of New York
- Meena Alexander, poet and writer, Graduate Center and Hunter College
- Robert Alfano, physicist, discovered the supercontinuum, City College
- Andrea Alu, engineer and physicist, Graduate Center
- Hannah Arendt, philosopher and political theorist; author of The Origins of Totalitarianism (1951) and The Human Condition (1958), Brooklyn College
- Talal Asad, anthropologist, Graduate Center
- John Ashbery, poet, Pulitzer Prize for Poetry winner, Brooklyn College
- William Bialek, biophysicist, Graduate Center
- Edwin G. Burrows, historian and writer, Pulitzer Prize for History winner for co-writing Gotham: A History of New York City to 1898 with Mike Wallace, Brooklyn College
- Ron Carter, jazz bassist, City College
- Joe Chambers, jazz drummer, City College
- Dee L. Clayman, classicist, Graduate Center
- Margaret Clapp, scholar, winner of the Pulitzer Prize for Biography or Autobiography, president of Wellesley College, Brooklyn College
- Ta-Nehisi Coates, writer, journalist, and activist, CUNY Graduate School of Journalism
- Billy Collins, poet, U.S. Poet Laureate, Lehman College (retired)
- Blanche Wiesen Cook, historian, John Jay College of Criminal Justice and Graduate Center
- John Corigliano, composer, Graduate Center
- Michael Cunningham, writer, winner of Pulitzer Prize for Fiction and PEN/Faulkner Award for The Hours, Brooklyn College
- Roy DeCarava, artist and photographer, Hunter College
- Carolyn Eisele, mathematician, Hunter College
- Nancy Fraser, philosopher and political scientist, Graduate Center
- Ruth Wilson Gilmore, geographer, Graduate Center
- Allen Ginsberg, beat poet, Brooklyn College
- Aaron Goodelman, sculptor
- Joel Glucksman, Olympic saber fencer, Brooklyn College
- Ralph Goldstein, Olympic épée fencer, Brooklyn College
- Michael Grossman, economist, Graduate Center
- Kimiko Hahn, poet, winner of PEN/Voelcker Award for Poetry, Queens College
- David Harvey, geographer, Graduate Center
- Jimmy Heath, jazz saxophonist, City College
- bell hooks, educator, writer and critic, City College of New York
- Karen Brooks Hopkins, president of the Brooklyn Academy of Music, Brooklyn College
- John Hospers, first presidential candidate of the US Libertarian Party, Brooklyn College
- Tyehimba Jess, poet, winner of Pulitzer Prize for Poetry, College of Staten Island
- KC Johnson born (1967), Brooklyn College and Graduate Center
- Sheila Jordan, jazz vocalist, City College
- Michio Kaku, physicist, City College
- Jane Katz, Olympian swimmer, John Jay College of Criminal Justice
- Alfred Kazin, writer and critic, Hunter College and Graduate Center
- Saul Kripke, philosopher, Graduate Center
- Irving Kristol, journalist, City College
- Paul Krugman, economist, Graduate Center
- Peter Kwong, journalist, filmmaker, activist, Hunter College and Graduate Center
- Nathan H. Lents, scientist, author, and science communicator, John Jay College of Criminal Justice
- Ben Lerner, writer, MacArthur Fellow, Brooklyn College
- Simi Linton, arts consultant, author, filmmaker, and activist; focuses on disability in the arts, disability studies
- Audre Lorde, poet and activist, City College, John Jay College of Criminal Justice
- Cate Marvin, poet, Guggenheim Fellowship winner, College of Staten Island
- Abraham Maslow, psychologist in the school of humanistic psychology, best known for his theory of human motivation, which led to a therapeutic technique known as self-actualization, Brooklyn College
- John Matteson, historian and writer, Pulitzer Prize winner, John Jay College of Criminal Justice
- Maeve Kennedy McKean, attorney and public health official
- Branko Milanović, economist known for work on income distribution and inequality; visiting presidential professor at the Graduate Center of the City University of New York; affiliated senior scholar at the Luxembourg Income Study; former lead economist in the World Bank's research department
- Stanley Milgram, social psychologist, Graduate Center
- Charles W. Mills, philosopher, Graduate Center
- June Nash, anthropologist, Graduate Center
- Ruth O'Brien, political scientist and disability studies writer, Graduate Center
- Denise O'Connor, Olympic foil fencer, Brooklyn College
- John Patitucci, jazz bassist, City College
- Itzhak Perlman, violinist, Brooklyn College
- Frances Fox Piven, political scientist, activist, and educator, Graduate Center
- Roman Popadiuk, US ambassador to Ukraine, Brooklyn College
- Graham Priest, philosopher, Graduate Center
- Inez Smith Reid, senior judge of the District of Columbia Court of Appeals, Brooklyn College
- Adrienne Rich, poet and activist, City College of New York
- David M. Rosenthal, philosopher, Graduate Center
- Mark Rothko (born Markus Yakovlevich Rothkowitz), influential abstract expressionist painter, Brooklyn College
- Arthur M. Schlesinger Jr., historian and social critic, Graduate Center
- Flora Rheta Schreiber, journalist, John Jay College of Criminal Justice
- Eve Kosofsky Sedgwick, literary critic, Graduate Center
- Betty Shabazz, educator and activist, Medgar Evers College
- Mark Strand, United States Poet Laureate, Pulitzer Prize for Poetry-winning poet, essayist, and translator, Brooklyn College
- Dennis Sullivan, mathematician, Graduate Center
- Harold Syrett (1913–1984), president of Brooklyn College
- Katherine Verdery, anthropologist, Graduate Center
- Michele Wallace, women's studies and film studies, City College and Graduate Center
- Mike Wallace, historian and writer, John Jay College of Criminal Justice and Graduate Center
- Ruth Westheimer (better known as Dr. Ruth; born Karola Ruth Siegel), sex therapist, media personality, author, radio, television talk show host, and Holocaust survivor, Brooklyn College
- Elie Wiesel, novelist, political activist, winner of the Nobel Peace Prize, Presidential Medal of Freedom, and Congressional Gold Medal, City College
- C. K. Williams, poet, won Pulitzer Prize for Poetry, Brooklyn College

== Campus safety ==
Patch of the CUNY Public Safety Department

CUNY has a unified public safety department, the City University of New York Public Safety Department, with branches at each of the 26 CUNY campuses.

The New York City Police Department is the primary policing and investigation agency within the New York City as per the NYC Charter, which includes all CUNY campuses and facilities.

The Public Safety Department came under heavy criticism from student groups, after several students protesting tuition increases tried to occupy the lobby of the Baruch College. The occupiers were forcibly removed from the area and several were arrested on November 21, 2011.

=== Antisemitism at CUNY ===
In recent years, there have been a number of antisemitic incidents on CUNY campuses, including:

- In March 2014, Brooklyn College settled the Title VI complaint that the Zionist Organization of America ("ZOA") had filed against its antisemitic discrimination.
- In 2017, a CUNY admin was recorded saying that there were too many Jews on campus.
- In 2020, a CUNY student was arrested for spray-painting antisemitic graffiti on a campus building.
- In 2021, a survey found that nearly one in four CUNY students had experienced antisemitism on campus. The survey also found that Jewish students were more likely to report feeling unsafe on campus than students of other faiths.
- In May 2021, a student at John Jay posted a picture of Adolf Hitler on Instagram with a message saying "We need another Hitler today." A group of Jewish students met with Karol Mason, the President of the college, who refused to condemn the action publicly.
- The Equal Employment Opportunity Commission cited CUNY in 2021 for failing to protect a Jewish professor after the PSC discriminated against him and subjected him to a hostile work environment on the basis of his Jewish faith.

CUNY has taken steps to address antisemitism on its campuses. In 2020, the university created a task force to combat antisemitism. The task force has developed a number of initiatives, including training for faculty and staff on how to identify and address antisemitism.

In June 2024, the United States Department of Education concluded that CUNY has failed to protect Jewish students from discrimination following the October 7 attacks. CUNY's Hunter College also faced scrutiny for incidents dating back to 2021. In response, Chancellor Félix V. Matos Rodríguez stated that CUNY is dedicated to maintaining a discrimination-free and hate-free environment, and that new measures will ensure consistent and transparent investigation and resolution of complaints.

== CUNY College Now ==
CUNY College Now is a free dual enrollment program partnering CUNY with the NYC DOE. It is mainly for 11th grade and 12th grade students, and it allows students to earn transferable college credits while still in high school by taking college-level courses at a local CUNY community college. The program had started in 1984, and in 2000 it was fully expanded to all CUNY undergraduate colleges.

== City University Television (CUNY TV) ==
CUNY also has a broadcast TV service, CUNY TV (channel 75 on Spectrum, digital HD broadcast channel 25.3), which airs telecourses, classic and foreign films, magazine shows, and panel discussions in foreign languages.

== City University Film Festival (CUNYFF) ==
The City University Film Festival is CUNY's official film festival. The festival was founded in 2009.

== Notable alumni ==
CUNY graduates include 13 Nobel laureates, 2 Fields Medalists, 2 U.S. secretaries of state, a Supreme Court justice, several New York City mayors, members of Congress, state legislators, scientists, artists, and Olympians.

== See also ==
- City University of New York Athletic Conference
- CUNY Academic Commons
- Education in New York City
- Guide Association
- State University of New York (SUNY) system.
- The William E. Macaualay Honors College
