= 1897 New York City Council President election =

1897 New York City Council presidential election
- November 2, 1897
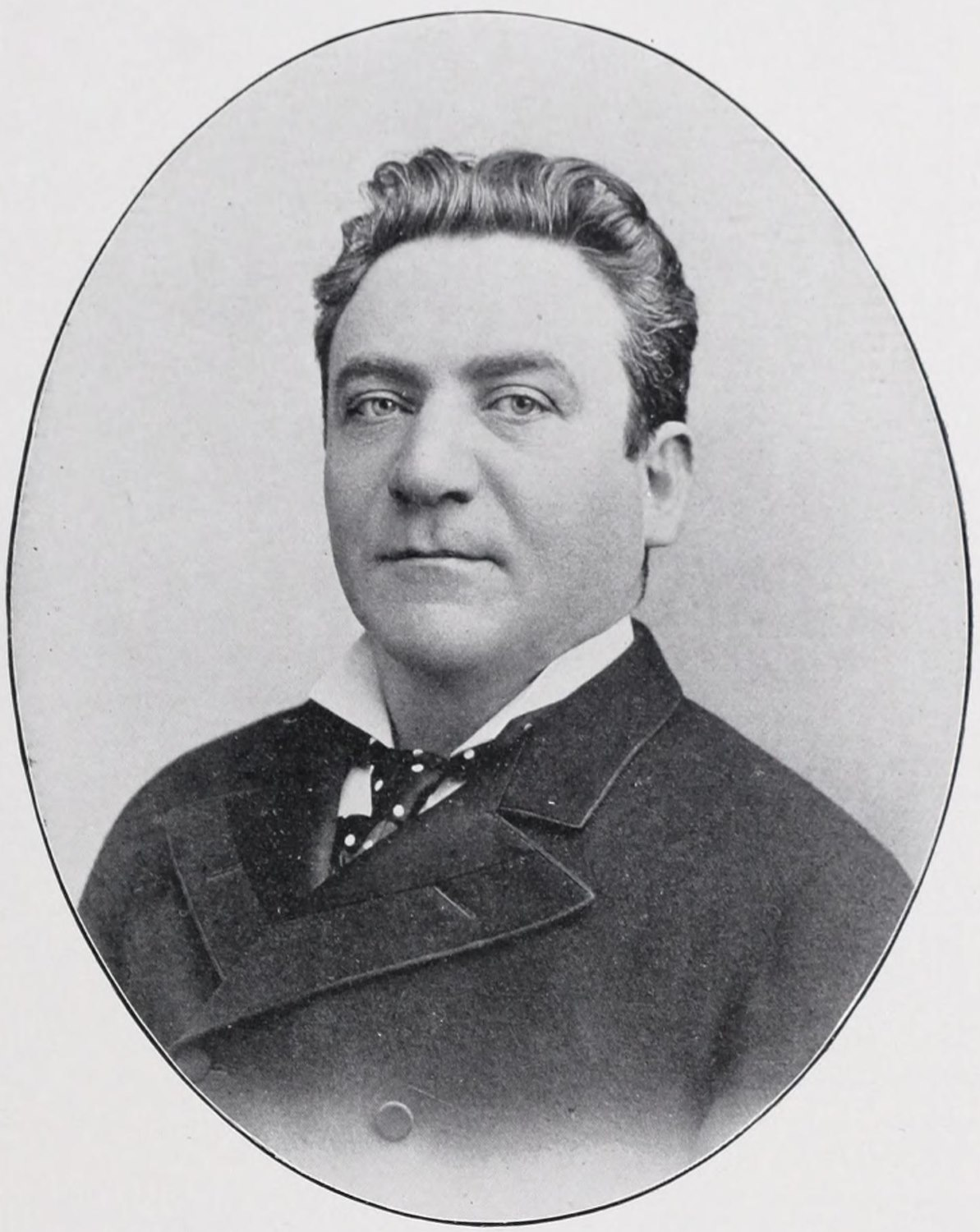

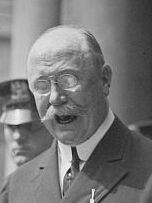

Nominee	Randolph Guggenheimer	R. Ross Appleton	John H. Schumann
Party	Democratic	Republican	Citizens Union
Popular vote	226,979	114,769	110,807
Percentage	47.9%	24.2%	23.4%
Elected President of the Council
Randolph Guggenheimer
Democratic

An election was held in New York City to election the President of its Council on November 2, 1897. The charter of the new City of Greater New York had created a bicameral Municipal Assembly, comprising an upper Council and a lower Board of Aldermen. The Council president was elected citywide while the Board of Aldermen elected its own president.

== General election ==
=== Candidates ===
- R. Ross Appleton, cotton goods broker and banker (Republican)
- Randolph Guggenheimer, philanthropist (Democratic)
- John H. Schumann, manufacturer and banker (Citizens Union and National Democratic)
- Jerome O'Neill, secretary of the New York Central Labor Union (Jeffersonian Democracy)

Schumann was a member of the Republican Party running on the Citizens Union ticket. He was a German-born resident of Brooklyn.

=== Results ===
1897 New York City Council presidential election
Party	Candidate	Votes	%
Democratic	Randolph Guggenheimer	226,979	47.88%
Republican	R. Ross Appleton	114,769	24.21%
Citizens Union	John H. Schumann	110,807	23.37%
Jeffersonian Democracy	Jerome O'Neill	21,513	4.54%
Total votes		474,068	

== Aftermath ==
The bicameral Municipal Assembly would prove to be short-lived, and it was replaced with a unicameral Board of Aldermen in 1901, whose President was elected citywide.
