= 1897 New York City Municipal Assembly election =

An election was held to fill the Municipal Assembly of the newly created City of Greater New York on November 2, 1897. The charter of the new city had created a bicameral Municipal Assembly, consisting of an upper Council and a lower Board of Aldermen. Each chamber was elected from specially-made districts. In addition, the president of the Council was elected in a separate election on the same day.

Democrats won majorities in both chambers of the Assembly, winning 26 of the Council's 28 seats and 47 of the 60 aldermanic seats. Affiliates of Tammany Hall filled all of Manhattan's seats in the Council. In addition, Democrat Randolph Guggenheimer won the Council Presidency.

Bicameralism would prove to be short-lived, as the Municipal Assembly was replaced with a unicameral Board of Aldermen in 1901.

== Council election ==
1897 New York City Council election
- November 2, 1897

All 28 seats of the New York City Council 14 seats needed for a majority
	Majority party	Minority party
Party	Democratic	Republican
Seats won	26	2

The Council was divided into ten districts, eight of which elected three members each. The remaining two—one covering Queens and the other Staten Island—elected two members each. One of the members from Queens was elected from Long Island City and Newtown and the other from the remainder of the borough. The entirety of the Bronx was located in the fifth district alongside upper Manhattan.

Members elected to the Council
District	Member	Note
1	John T. Oakley, Tammany	
1	Martin Engel, Tammany	
1	Thomas F. Foley, Tammany	
2	Charles F. Allen, Tammany	
2	Patrick J. Ryder, Tammany	
2	Frank J. Goodwin, Tammany	
3	John J. Murphy, Tammany	
3	Harry C. Hart, Tammany	
3	George R. Christman, Tammany	
4	Stewart M. Brice, Tammany	
4	Eugene A. Wise, Tammany	
4	Herman Sulzer, Tammany	
5	A. C. Hottenroth, Tammany	
5	Bernard C. Murray, Tammany	
5	William J. Hyland, Tammany	
6	F. F. Williams, Republican	
6	Charles H. Francisco, Republican	Disputed
6	Conrad Hester, Democratic	
7	Adam H. Leich, Republican	
7	Charles H. Ebbets, Democratic	
7	Henry French, Democratic	
8	John J, McGarry, Democratic	
8	William A. Doyle, Democratic	
8	Martin F. Conly, Democratic	
9	Joseph Cassidy, Democratic	Representing Long Island City and Newtown
9	D. L. Van Nostrand, Democratic	Representing the remainder
10	Joseph F. O'Grady, Democratic	
10	Benjamin Bodine, Democratic	

== Aldermanic election ==
Each assembly district in the city was entitled to elect one member to the Board of Aldermen, except for Queens, which elected two overall (one from Long Island City and Newtown and the other from the remainder) and the Bronx, from which one member was elected from Westchester County's first and second assembly districts.

== Bibliography ==
- The Charter of the City of New York, Chapter 378 of the Laws of 1897, With amendments passed in 1898 and 1899, and a complete index, and maps of boroughs. Eagle Building, Brooklyn: Office of Publication. September 1899.
