= Dee L. Clayman =

American classical scholar

Dee L. Clayman is an American classical scholar and a professor of Classics at the City University of New York. She is a pioneer in the effort to digitize the humanities and served as president of the Society for Classical Studies.

== Education ==
Clayman earned a bachelor's degree in Greek with honors from Wellesley College. She holds a MA in Latin and Greek as well as a Ph.D. in Classical Studies, from the University of Pennsylvania.

== Career ==
Clayman began her career in 1972 as an assistant professor at Brooklyn College, ultimately rising to the position of Professor of Classics in 1982. Beginning in 1985, Clayman also served as Professor of Classics at the Graduate Center of the City University of New York where she was Executive Officer of the PhD Program in Classics from 1995 to 2022. She became professor emeritus upon her retirement in 2023.

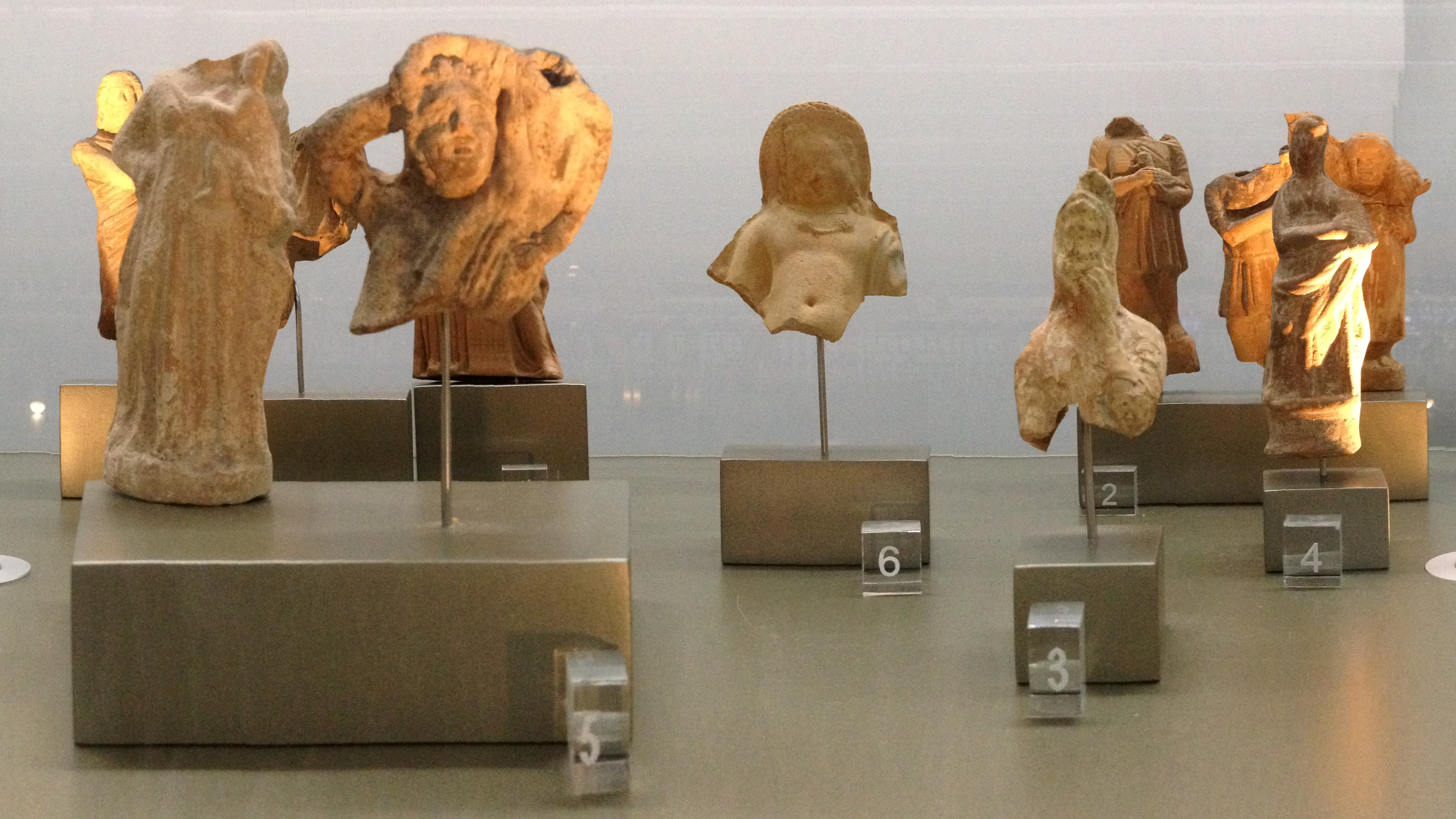
Hellenistic Period

Her areas of academic research include the Hellenistic period, with specific emphasis on the work of Callimachus, Theocritus, Apollonius of Rhodes and the epigrammatists, as well as the intersection of Hellenistic poetry with history and philosophy.

An early adopter of using digital technology to explore the classics, Clayman is the recipient of 10 individual grants from the National Endowment for the Humanities and various private foundations to support the development of an online database of classical bibliography. This effort, which attempts to catalog scholarly work about ancient Greek and Latin language, linguistics and history as well as Roman history, literature, and philosophy from the second millennium B.C. to roughly 500-800 A.D., has significantly expanded global access to a wide variety of research materials. The project was initially published in 1995 as a set of CD-ROMs and is now incorporated with the Année philologique.

In addition to her academic work, Clayman was the founding editor-in-chief of Oxford Bibliographies: Classics. She previously served as president of the Société internationale de bibliographie classique, and is past-president of the American Philological Association, now known as the Society for Classical Studies.

Clayman is a former member of the Institute for Advanced Study in Princeton, New Jersey.

== Selected works ==
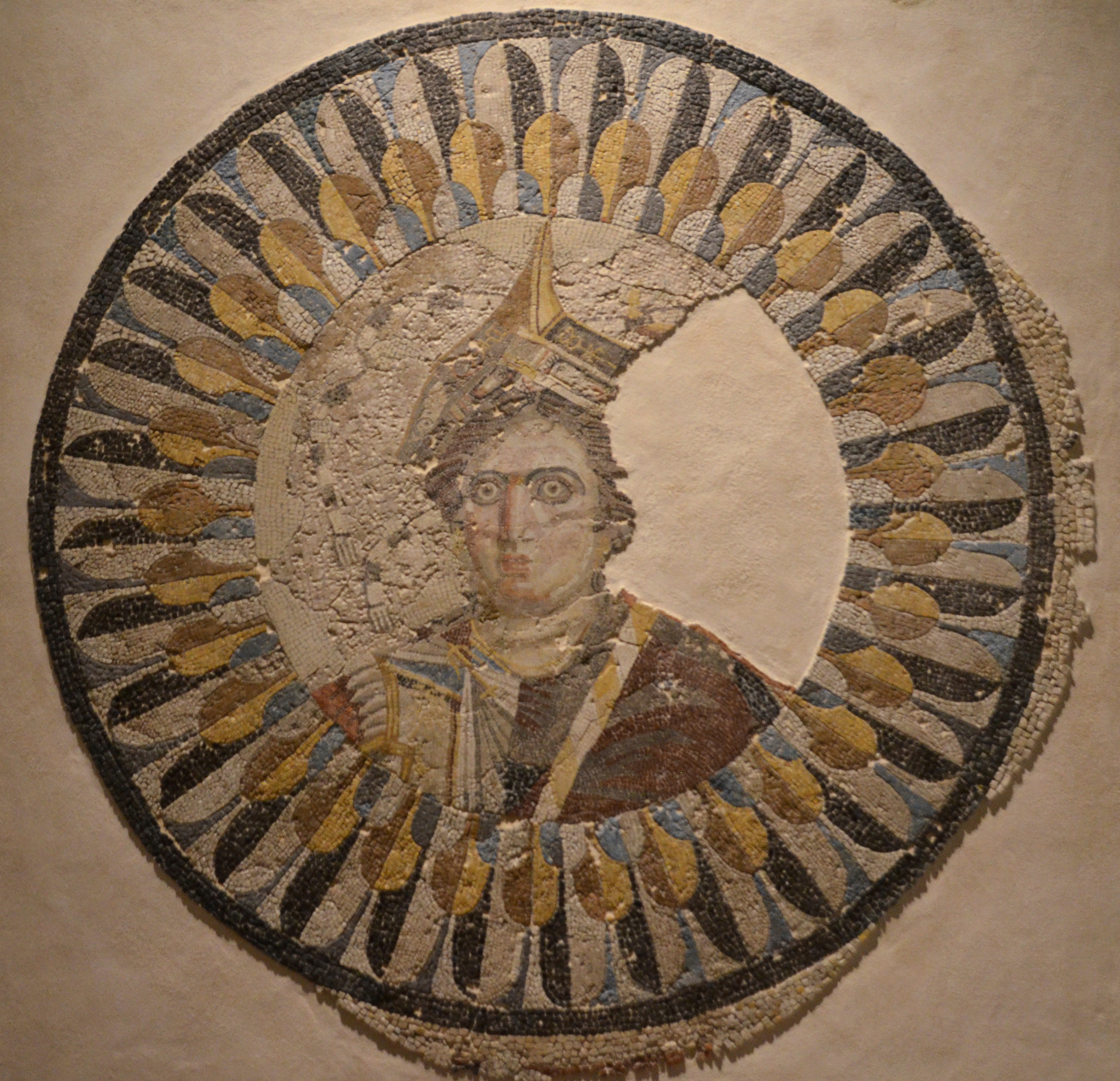
Queen Berenice II

=== Books ===
- Callimachus, (3 vols. Loeb Classical Library)
- Queen Berenice II and the Golden Age of Ptolemaic Egypt
- Timon of Philus: Pyrrhonism into Poetry
- Callimachus’ Iambi

=== Articles ===
- "Callimachus’ Doric Graces (15 G.-P. = AP 5.146)"
- "Did Any Berenike Attend the Isthmian Games? A Literary Perspective on Posidippus 82 AB"
- Database of Classical Bibliography
- “The Digitization of the Anneé Philologique”
- "Trends and Issues in Quantitative Stylistics."
- "Time Series Analysis of Word Length in Oedipus the King,"
- "The Meaning of Corinna's Weroia."

== Awards ==
- Fellowship, National Endowment for the Humanities, 2010–11
- Senior Fellowship, American Council of Learned Societies, 2002-3
- Medal for Distinguished Service, American Philological Association, 1999
