= City University Film Festival =

Official film festival of CUNY

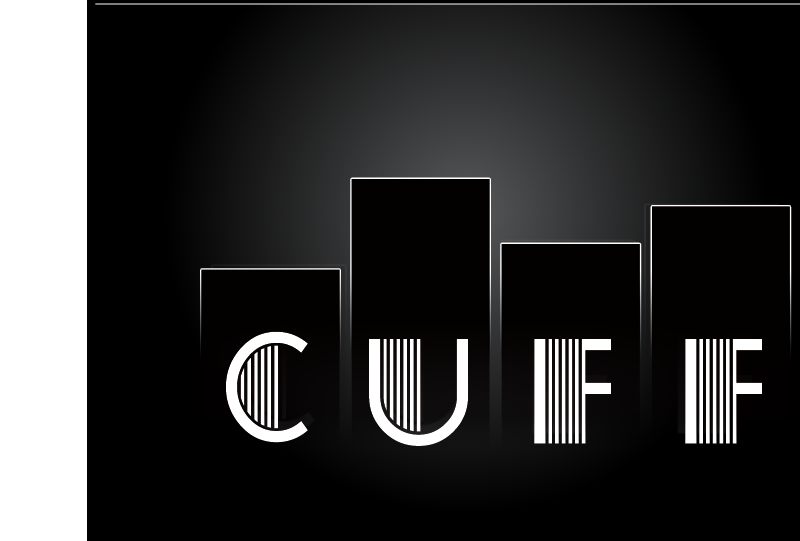
- Festival logo
- Location: New York City, New York
- Website: cunyff.org

The CUNY Film Festival is the official film festival of CUNY. The festival promotes creative collaboration between filmmakers from CUNY's four-year schools, two-year schools, and graduate programs offering students a chance to promote their own work, review the work of their peers, and engage with industry professionals. The festival is held annually in the spring and is open to the public. CUNYFF also offers free career development workshops throughout the year.

The first annual festival was in 2008.

== History ==
CUNYFF was founded by Hunter College film student Daniel Cowen in 2008. Cowen had made a short film and planned to enter it into CUNY's film festival when he was surprised to find that CUNY did not have one that drew on work from numerous CUNY schools. In starting CUNYFF, Cowen hoped to foster a "sense of community and to promote cross campus projects" among students at CUNY's various four-year commuter colleges.

CUNYFF's inaugural festival was held on March 29, 2009 at the Macaulay Honors College and screened 14 CUNY student films to over 150 attendees. CUNYFF 09 received seventy-four submissions from students of seven CUNY four-year colleges.

CUNYFF 09 hosted a master class on March 22, 2009 that featured Melvin McCray, Senior editor at ABC; Greg Rhem, Manager of Documentary acquisitions at HBO; Matt Kohn, documentary filmmaker and director of Call It Democracy.

In 2009, CUNYFF was sponsored by HBO and The City of New York Mayor’s Office of Film, Theater and Broadcasting.

CUNYFF 2010 received over one hundred films. The festival was held on March 20, 2010. CUNYFF 2010 was sponsored by Thirteen, HBO, and the New York City Mayor's Office of Film, Theatre & Broadcasting. CUFF 2011 received over 150 films.

CUNYFF 2012 took place on March 14–18 with opening night workshops, camera demos, and a resource fair at the Skylight Room of the CUNY Graduate Center. A special "Kickstarter Panel" with past CUNYFF filmmakers and a representative from Kicstarter.com convened on March 16 at Macaulay Honors College, 35 West 67th St, New York NY.

== Judging ==
The 2009 CUNYFF was judged by several CUNY film Professors and Greg Rhem of HBO. For CUNYFF 2010 judging, a panel of 20 CUNY film professors was convened.

Currently, the judging panel is composed of professors from various CUNY institutions and people from the media industry.
