= List of Nobel laureates affiliated with the City University of New York as alumni or faculty =

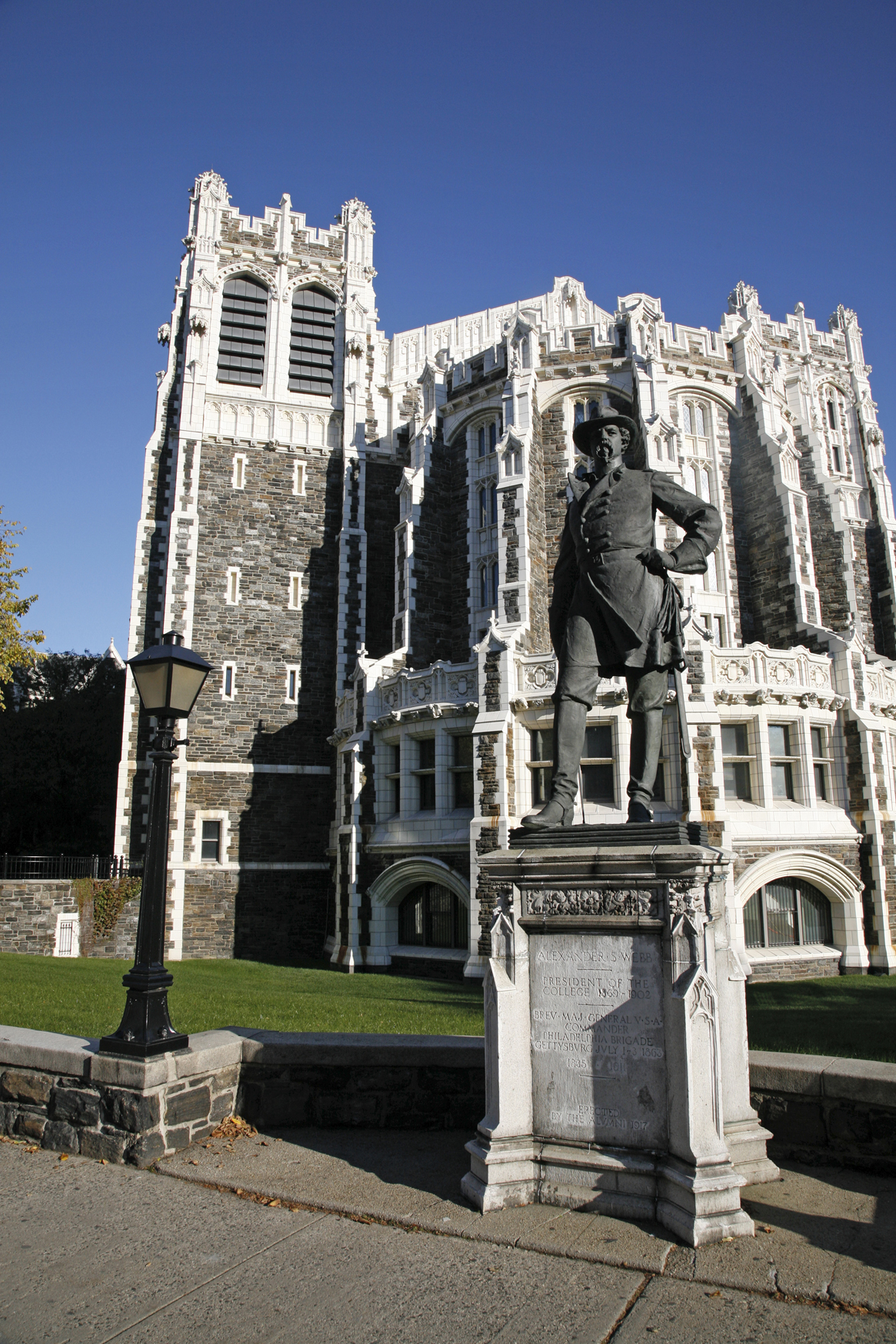
Thirteen Nobel laureates have been affiliated with the City University of New York (CUNY). The building pictured is Shepard Hall of the City College of New York, a senior college of CUNY.

This list of Nobel laureates affiliated with the City University of New York as alumni or faculty comprehensively shows alumni (graduates and attendees) or faculty members (professors of various ranks, researchers, and visiting lecturers or professors) affiliated with the City University of New York (CUNY) who were awarded the Nobel Prize or the Nobel Memorial Prize in Economic Sciences. People who have given public lectures, talks or non-curricular seminars; studied as non-degree students; received honorary degrees; or served as administrative staff at the university are excluded from the list. Summer school attendees and visitors are generally excluded from the list, since summer terms are not part of formal academic years; the same rule applies to the extension school.

The Nobel Prizes are awarded annually by the Royal Swedish Academy of Sciences, the Karolinska Institute, and the Norwegian Nobel Committee to individuals who make outstanding contributions in the fields of chemistry, physics, literature, peace, and physiology or medicine. They were established by the 1895 will of Alfred Nobel, which dictates that the awards should be administered by the Nobel Foundation. Another prize, the Nobel Memorial Prize in Economic Sciences, was established in 1968 by the Sveriges Riksbank, the central bank of Sweden, for contributors to the field of economics. Each prize is awarded by a separate committee; the Royal Swedish Academy of Sciences awards the Prizes in Physics, Chemistry, and Economics, the Karolinska Institute awards the Prize in Physiology or Medicine, and the Norwegian Nobel Committee awards the Prize in Peace. Each recipient receives a medal, a diploma and a cash prize that has varied throughout the years. In 1901, the winners of the first Nobel Prizes were given 150,782 SEK, which is equal to 7,731,004 SEK in December 2007. In 2008, the winners were awarded a prize amount of 10,000,000 SEK. The awards are presented in Stockholm in an annual ceremony on December 10, the anniversary of Nobel's death.

As of 2021, there have been 14 Nobel laureates affiliated with CUNY as alumni or faculty. CUNY considers any laureate who attended one of its senior colleges as an affiliated laureate. Arthur Kornberg, who graduated from the City College of New York, a senior college of CUNY, in 1937, was the first CUNY laureate, winning the Nobel Prize in Physiology or Medicine in 1959. Herbert A. Hauptman and Jerome Karle, both of whom graduated from the City College in 1937 with Kornberg, jointly won the Nobel Prize in Chemistry in 1985, the only CUNY laureates to do so. Six CUNY laureates have won the Nobel Prize in Physiology or Medicine, more than any other category. Ten of the CUNY laureates graduated from the City College; two laureates, Rosalyn Sussman Yalow and Gertrude B. Elion, graduated from Hunter College, another CUNY senior college; and one laureate, Stanley Cohen, graduated from Brooklyn College, one of CUNY's senior colleges, in 1943.

== Laureates ==
Year	Image	Laureate	Relation	Category	Rationale
1959		Arthur Kornberg (shared with Severo Ochoa)	City College, class of 1937	Physiology or Medicine	"for their discovery of the mechanisms in the biological synthesis of ribonucleic acid and deoxyribonucleic acid"
1961		Robert Hofstadter (shared with Rudolf Mössbauer)	City College, class of 1935	Physics	"for his pioneering studies of electron scattering in atomic nuclei and for his thereby achieved discoveries concerning the structure of the nucleons"
1970		Julius Axelrod (shared with Bernard Katz and Ulf von Euler)	City College, class of 1933	Physiology or Medicine	"for their discoveries concerning the humoral transmittors in the nerve terminals and the mechanism for their storage, release and inactivation"
1972		Kenneth Arrow (shared with John Hicks)	City College, class of 1940	Economics	"for their pioneering contributions to general economic equilibrium theory and welfare theory."
1977		Rosalyn Sussman Yalow (shared with Roger Guillemin and Andrew Schally)	Hunter College, class of 1941	Physiology or Medicine	"for the development of radioimmunoassays of peptide hormones"
1978		Arno Allan Penzias (shared with Pyotr Kapitsa and Robert Woodrow Wilson)	City College, class of 1954	Physics	"for their discovery of cosmic microwave background radiation"
1985		Herbert A. Hauptman (shared with Jerome Karle)	City College, class of 1937	Chemistry	"for their achievements in developing direct methods for the determination of crystal structures"
1985		Jerome Karle (shared with Herbert A. Hauptman)	City College, class of 1937	Chemistry	"for their achievements in developing direct methods for the determination of crystal structures"
1986		Stanley Cohen (shared with Rita Levi-Montalcini)	Brooklyn College, class of 1943	Physiology or Medicine	"for their discoveries of growth factors"
1988		Gertrude B. Elion (shared with James W. Black and George H. Hitchings)	Hunter College, class of 1937	Physiology or Medicine	"for their discoveries of important principles for drug treatment"
1988		Leon M. Lederman (shared with Melvin Schwartz and Jack Steinberger)	City College, class of 1943	Physics	"for the neutrino beam method and the demonstration of the doublet structure of the leptons through the discovery of the muon neutrino"
2005		Robert Aumann (shared with Thomas Schelling)	City College, class of 1950	Economics	"for having enhanced our understanding of conflict and cooperation through game-theory analysis."
2008		Paul Krugman	Distinguished Scholar, CUNY Graduate Center (2014–)	Economics	"for his analysis of trade patterns and location of economic activity."
2014		John O'Keefe (shared with Edvard Moser and May-Britt Moser)	City College, class of 1963	Physiology or Medicine	"for their discoveries of cells that constitute a positioning system in the brain"
