= Ruth O'Brien =

American author

Ruth Ann O'Brien is an American author and editor best known for her writing in the field of disability studies. She is a professor at the City University of New York.

== Education and career ==
O'Brien was born in Spokane, Washington, and grew up in California. In 1977 she become a page in the U.S. House of Representatives after being nominated by Representative William M. Ketchum. She earned a B.A. from Claremont Men's College (now Claremont McKenna College) as part of the first group of women to enroll, and a Ph.D. in political science from University of California, Los Angeles (1991). Following her Ph.D., O'Brien taught at the University of Denver before moving to the John Jay College of Criminal Justice at the City University of New York in 1993. In 2003, she became the executive officer of the Ph.D./M.A. program in political science at the CUNY Graduate Center. As of 2024, O'Brien is a professor at the City University of New York.

O'Brien is known for her writings and discussions on the Americans with Disabilities Act of 1990 and its implications for the workplace. Her book Crippled Justice was the first written history of the Americans with Disabilities Act, and was reviewed by Leonard Kriegel and others. In Bodies in Revolt she examined disability in the workplace, and this book was reviewed in Law & Society Review in 2008. She has also published on Barack Obama's presidency.

== Selected publications ==
- O'Brien, Ruth (1998). Workers' Paradox : The Republican origins of New Deal labor policy, 1886-1935. Chapel Hill: University of North Carolina Press. ISBN 0-8078-6695-4. OCLC 45843939.
- O'Brien, Ruth (2001). Crippled Justice : the history of modern disability policy in the workplace. Chicago. ISBN 9780226616605.
- O'Brien, Ruth (2003). "From a Doctor's to a Judge's Gaze: Epistemic Communities and the History of Disability Rights Policy in the Workplace". Polity. 35 (3): 325–346. doi:10.1086/POLv35n3ms3235522. ISSN 0032-3497. JSTOR 3235522. S2CID 158038229.
- O'Brien, Ruth (2005). Bodies in revolt : gender, disability, and a workplace ethic of care. New York: Routledge. ISBN 978-1-135-39324-3. OCLC 846494690.
- O'Brien, Ruth (2013). Out of many, one : Obama and the third American political tradition. Foreword by Thomas Byrne Edsall. Chicago. ISBN 978-0-226-04159-9. OCLC 809911073.
- O'Brien, Ruth (2005-01-01). "Other Voices at the Workplace: Gender, Disability, and an Alternative Ethic of Care". Signs: Journal of Women in Culture and Society. 30 (2): 1529–1555. doi:10.1086/423350. ISSN 0097-9740. S2CID 145655270.
