= Alix Williamson =

American publicist (1916–2001)

Alix Williamson (5 April 1916 – 26 August 2001) was an American publicist who specialized in promoting musical artists both in the United States and abroad. A graduate of Hunter College, she promoted the Juilliard String Quartet for 23 years and The Chamber Music Society of Lincoln Center for 22 years. For 15 years she was the press representative for pianist André Watts, and also spent 15 years as tenor Richard Tucker's press agent. She managed the career of the Trapp Family Singers for more than two decades; and it was she who came up with the idea for Maria von Trapp's autobiographical work The Story of the Trapp Family Singers (1949) (the basis for the Rodgers and Hammerstein musical The Sound of Music). She also worked as a promoter for the New York Philharmonic for 15 years.

== Publications ==
- Untermeyer, Sophie Guggenheimer; Williamson, Alix (1960). Mother is Minnie (biography on Minnie Guggenheimer). New York City: Doubleday & Co.
