= Randolph Guggenheimer =

American lawyer, philanthropist (1907–1999)

Randolph Guggenheimer (November 4, 1907 – July 1, 1999) was an American lawyer, and philanthropist. Guggenheimer advocated for improved medical services for residents of Harlem from poor areas. In 1979, he and management consultant Eugene McCabe co-founded North General Hospital, a community hospital in Harlem. They opened the hospital in the building previously occupied by the Hospital for Joint Diseases after that hospital moved. Guggenheimer later served as chair of the Board of Directors of North General Hospital.

== Early life and education ==
Guggenheimer was born to Minna (or Minnie) and Charles Solomon Guggenheimer in Manhattan, New York City on November 4, 1907. He was the grandson and namesake of Randolph Guggenheimer (1846–1907), a politician in New York City. He graduated in 1924 from Morristown School (now Morristown Beard School) in Morristown, New Jersey.

Guggenheimer received a bachelor's degree at Yale University in New Haven, Connecticut in 1928. He completed a law degree at Harvard Law School in Cambridge, Massachusetts

After graduation, he joined Guggenheimer & Untermyer, the law firm founded by his grandfather. In 1942, Guggenheimer joined the United States Army Air Forces. After receiving a commission as a first lieutenant, he served as an intelligence officer with the headquarters of the 63d Fighter Squadron. During World War II, Guggenheimer served as the executive officer of 402d Fighter Squadron with the Ninth Air Force.

== Recognition and legacy ==
In 1991, New York City Mayor David Dinkins honored Guggenheimer's work to ensure hospital services for residents of Harlem. Eight years later, Congresswoman Carolyn Maloney recognized his work's impact during remarks on the floor of the U.S. House of Representatives. During his advocacy career, Guggenheimer also received the United Hospital Fund's Distinguished Community Service Award.

== Family ==
Guggenheimer was a nephew of civic leader Samuel Untermyer, the namesake of Untermyer Park in Yonkers, New York.

In 1932, Guggenheimer married civic leader Elinor Coleman Guggenheimer. Elinor Guggenheimer served as commissioner of cultural affairs for New York City and as a member of the New York City Planning Commission. She also founded the New York Women's Agenda and the Council of Senior Centers and Services. They had two children together: Charles and Randolph Guggenheimer Jr. In 1997, Maloney paid tribute to the philanthropic work of Guggenheimer and Elinor Guggenheimer on their 65th wedding anniversary.

From 1918 to 1964, Guggenheimer's mother Minna produced the annual summer concerts at Lewisohn Stadium at City College of New York. The concert series brought well-known musicians to Harlem and enabled residents to attend for an admission price of less than $1.
