= Minnie Guggenheimer =

American philanthropist (1882–1966)

- Born: Minna Schafer; October 22, 1882; New York City, New York, U.S.
- Died: May 23, 1966 (aged 83); New York City, New York, U.S.
- Burial place: Salem Fields Cemetery; Brooklyn, New York City, U.S.
- Occupations: Patron of the arts, philanthropist, pianist
- Spouse: Charles Solomon Guggenheimer (m. 1903–1953; his death)
- Children: 4, including Randolph Guggenheimer
- Relatives: Randolph Guggenheimer

Minnie Guggenheimer (née Minna Schafer; October 22, 1882 – May 23, 1966) was an American patron of the arts and philanthropist. For forty years she was a director of Lewisohn Stadium in New York City, where she organized concerts in the summer season. She was often referred to as Mrs. Charles S. Guggenheimer.

== Early life and family ==
Minnie Guggenheimer was born as Minna Schafer on October 22, 1882 in New York City. She was born into a Jewish family and was the daughter of Sophie (née Schwab) and Samuel Schafer. Her father's side of the family was in the banking business and founded Schafer Brothers. Her paternal grandfather, Meyer Schafer emigrated from the Kingdom of Bavaria to the United States in the early 19th century, and had made money in the California gold rush, resulting in his sons establishment of a stock brokerage firm.

She grew up appreciating music and playing the piano, but never was formally trained. Her other hobby was mushroom foraging.

In 1903, she and Charles Solomon Guggenheimer married at Temple Emanu-El, a former Reform Judaism synagogue at 43rd and 5th Avenue in New York City. Charles was a lawyer and the son of Randolph Guggenheimer (1846–1907).

== Career ==
She produced the annual summer concerts at Lewisohn Stadium at City College of New York, from 1918 to 1964. The concert series brought well-known musicians to Harlem, and enabled residents to attend for an admission price of less than $1.

In 1951, Guggenheimer was awarded the title of Chevalier (Knight) of the French National Order of the Legion of Honour, and in 1952, she received the John H. Finley Award. In 1961, she was awarded the Richard A. Cook Gold Medal Award.

In her late life she was a frequent guest on Jack Paar's television series, Tonight Starring Jack Paar (1957–1962). She was the subject of a biography, Mother Is Minnie (1960), co-authored by her daughter Sophie Guggenheimer Untermeyer and publicist Alix Williamson.

== Death ==
Guggenheimer remained married until her husband's death in 1953. She died at the age of 83 on May 23, 1966, in her home in New York City. She was survived by two of her children, Randolph and Sophie.
