= Elinor Guggenheimer =

American civic leader, author, philanthropist (1912–2008)

Elinor "Ellie" Sophia Coleman Guggenheimer (April 11, 1912 – September 29, 2008) was an American civic leader, author, and philanthropist in New York City.

== Biography ==
Elinor Guggenheimer was born as Elinor Sophia Coleman on April 11, 1912 in Manhattan. She attended Vassar College, before transferring to Barnard College, where she graduated in 1933.

She married in 1932 to Randolph Guggenheimer (1907–1999) a lawyer of the firm Guggenheimer, Untermyer & Marshall.

Guggenheimer founded the Day Care Council of New York in 1948, followed by the National Day Care and Child Development Council in 1958. An urban planner, she became the first woman to join the New York City Planning Commission in 1961. In 1969 she ran unsuccessfully in the Democratic Party primary to be their candidate for president of the New York City Council. Her activism in the Women's movement led her to create the New York Women's Forum in 1973, and she served as commissioner of consumer affairs in the 1970s. In 1979, Guggennheimer founded the Council of Senior Centers and Services of New York City and was its first executive director. Later, Guggenheimer founded the New York Women's Agenda in 1992 and the Council of Senior Centers and Services.

Her philanthropy focused on women, the elderly, and Jewish causes. Guggenheimer wrote the books Planning for Parks and Recreation in Urban Areas and an instructional manual for entertaining called The Pleasure of Your Company. Her 1983 musical Potholes had a short run off-Broadway.

Her lifetime of service earned her a Presidential Citizens Medal in 1997 from President Clinton.

Guggenheimer died on September 29, 2008, in Manhattan.

== Sources ==
- The White House
