= Charles V. Fornes =

American politician

James Charles V. Fornes
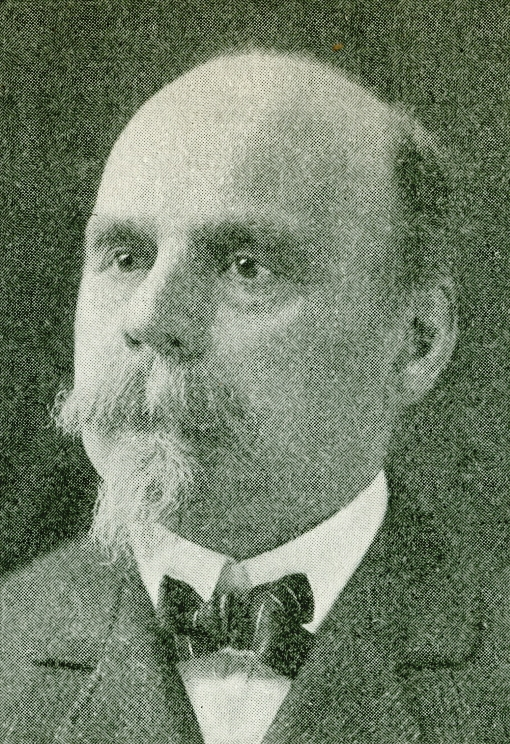

Member of the U.S. House of Representatives from New York's 11th district
- In office March 4, 1907 – January 3, 1913
- Preceded by: William Randolph Hearst
- Succeeded by: Daniel J. Riordan

1st President of the New York City Board of Aldermen
- In office January 1, 1902 – December 27, 1905
- Preceded by: Randolph Guggenheimer (as president of the City Council)
- Succeeded by: Patrick F. McGowan

Personal details
- Born: January 22, 1844 Williamsville, New York
- Died: May 22, 1929 (aged 85) Buffalo, New York
- Resting place: United French and German Roman Catholic Cemetery
- Party: Democratic Party
- Education: Union Academy
- Occupation: Educator

Charles Vincent Fornes (January 22, 1844 – May 22, 1929) was an American educator and politician who served three terms as a United States representative from New York from 1907 to 1913.

== Early life and career ==
Born on a farm near Williamsville, Erie County, he attended the public schools, and was graduated from Union Academy (in Lockport) in 1864.

He moved to Buffalo in 1866, taught school in a district school, and then served as principal of a Buffalo public school for three years. He was employed as a clerk for a wholesale woolen merchant in Buffalo and later established a similar business for himself. In 1877 he moved to New York City and engaged in business as an importer and jobber of woolens.

He was president of the board of aldermen of New York City from 1902 to 1907, and was trustee and director of several banks and corporations.

== Congress ==
Fornes was elected as a Democrat to the 60th, 61st, and 62nd sessions of Congress, holding office from March 4, 1907 to March 3, 1913. He declined to be a candidate for renomination in 1912.

== Later career and death ==
He resumed his former business pursuits in New York City. He retired from active business in 1926 and returned to Buffalo, where he died in 1929; interment was in United German and French Roman Catholic Cemetery, Pine Hill, Buffalo.

U.S. House of Representatives
Preceded by William R. Hearst	Member of the U.S. House of Representatives from New York's 11th congressional district 1907–1913	Succeeded by Daniel J. Riordan
