= New York Women's Agenda =

The New York Women’s Agenda (NYWA) is an umbrella organization of women's groups in the New York City metropolitan area. Its membership consists of both nonprofit women's organizations and individuals.

== About NYWA ==
Founded in 1992 by Elinor Guggenheimer, NYWA is a nonprofit organization dedicated to bettering the lives of women and children of New York.

NYWA's members represent the diversity of New York City and include community-based groups; religious, ethnic, and political groups; professional associations; and issues-based groups. Through NYWA, these groups unite to work on issues of common interest and to advocate for public policy.

== Agendas ==
NYWA is involved in various activities which focus on a broad range of public policy issues that affect the quality of life of women and their families. These are grouped into three main areas, or "agendas" that are the focus of NYWA's work each year.

- Governmental Affairs Agenda: Their most recent success was the Fair Pay Forum held at Hunter College in December 2008 featuring Lilly Ledbetter which stimulated passage of the Lilly Ledbetter Fair Pay Act of 2009. "The legislation expanded workers’ rights to sue in this kind of case, and relaxed the statute of limitations, restarting the six-month clock every time the worker receives a paycheck." For the most current information, go to NYWA/EPCNYC BLOG: www.nywaepcnyc.org
- Economic Security Agenda: Most recently, NYWA has developed the Strategic Business Leadership program with the School of Continuing and Professional Studies, New York University, Department of Leadership and Human Capital Management. This program is tailored specifically towards women leaders of profit and nonprofit organizations and government agencies who are looking to improve their leadership skills and increase their organization’s effectiveness. Participants in this program receive an Executive Certificate in Strategic Business Leadership.
- Quality of Life Agenda: focuses on what may improve living conditions for New York women and their families, including affordability of housing, the physical environment, recreation, health, safety, culture, and the sense of community.

== Programs ==
- Financial Literacy: Financial literacy was first addressed in 1998 when Muriel Siebert was NYWA president. Now, in conjunction with the Manhattan Chamber of Commerce NYWA created The New York City Financial Literacy Guide for Girls and Women. "Women are in a special need of becoming financially literate. Yet women often do not want to admit their problems in money management. This Guide provides numerous different resources including self-study possibilities as well as workshops, courses and events."
- New York Breaks the Silence Together: This program was begun by Linda Fairstein, former chief of the Manhattan District Attorney's sex crimes unit because, "We lose the victims before the trial...The victims withdraw, choose not to prosecute, some because of fear of reprisal, some because of the psychological feelings involved. The perception has been nationally...that these cases don't do well in the system"
- New York Reads Together: This is the first citywide book discussion project to foster literacy. Supported by the New York City school system and nationally known newscaster Roz Abrams, it is one of NYWA's most successful programs. At its 2005 commencement, Pace University President David A. Caputo honored Roz Abrams's work on this program, "You serve as cochair of the New York Reads Together Program, a program of New York’s Women’s Agenda that aims to foster citywide discussions based on people all reading the same book at the same time."

== Star Breakfast ==
In 2008, the Star Breakfast presented the inaugural Elinor Guggenheimer Lifetime Achievement Award to Barbara Walters. Honored speakers were New York City mayor Michael Bloomberg and first lady of New York State Michelle Paterson. In 2009, Gloria Steinem presented this award to Jane Fonda. Michelle Paterson was honored speaker.
