= Lewisohn Stadium =

Defunct stadium in New York City

Coordinates: 40.819105°N 73.95119°W

Lewisohn Stadium was an amphitheater and athletic facility built on the campus of the City College of New York (CCNY). It opened in 1915 and was demolished in 1973.

== History ==
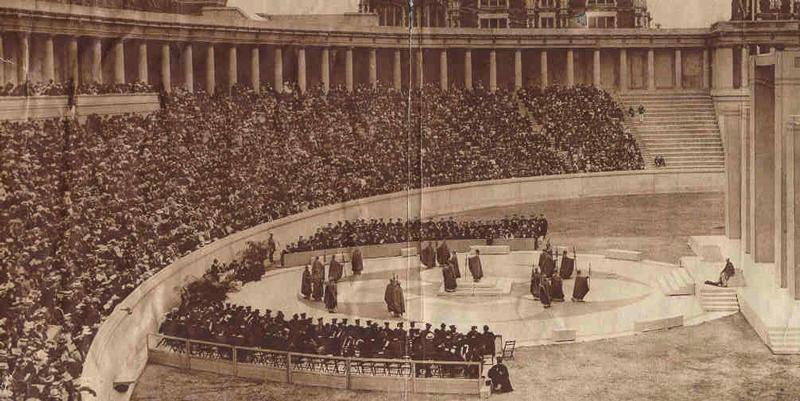
Performance of a Greek tragedy during the stadium's dedication on May 29, 1915

The Doric-colonnaded amphitheater was built between Amsterdam and Convent Avenues, from 136th to 138th Streets. Financier and philanthropist Adolph Lewisohn donated the money for construction.

It opened in 1915, with a seating capacity of 8,000. The stadium hosted many athletic, musical, and theatrical events. It was one of New York's public landmarks.

Lewisohn Stadium was demolished in 1973 to make way for the $125 million North Academic Center. In 1985, a plaza outside the center was rededicated as the Lewisohn Plaza, in memory of the stadium and its philanthropist.

== Athletics ==
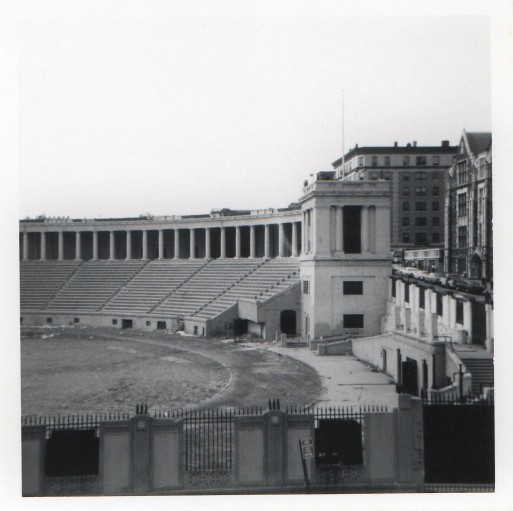
Lewisohn Stadium in 1973, just before demolition

The CCNY football team played its home games at Lewisohn from 1921 to 1950. The final game played was a 33–6 Beavers victory over Lowell Textile on November 18, 1950, in front of 300 fans. (It was CCNY's only win that season, and the program was discontinued the following year.)

Along with Jasper Oval (right across Convent Avenue, also now demolished), Lewisohn was used throughout the academic year for many of the college's uptown campus outdoor intramural sports.

The CCNY Varsity Rifle Team had its indoor, 50' small bore range under the stadium steps, entered through a doorway at the north end. The coach, Jerrold Uretsky (Jerry), was an accomplished expert marksman with numerous medals and championships. For many years, the CCNY Rifle Team excelled in national, regional and local competition and was consistently in the NRA-sponsored Top Ten national ranking, with the best record of any team at CCNY. They traveled around the U.S. to compete against different collegiate teams as well as against Army and Navy which were the only teams they could never beat. Unfortunately, the team dissolved within 3 years of the loss of Lewisohn. The range was notoriously loud, with a steel backstop and concrete walls, and no acoustic insulation.

== Concerts ==
External audio
- Lewisohn Stadium hosts: Richard Tucker with Licia Albanese and Alfredo Antonini in an All-Puccini program (1959), WQXR
- You may hear historic concerts broadcast on radio from Lewisohn Stadium; Here on wnyc.org

In addition to hosting sporting events, the stadium was used for musical performances for nearly five decades starting in 1918 under the supervision of Minnie Guggenheimer, who attended the stadium's inaugural concert with her son Randolph Guggenheimer. For the admission price of merely twenty five cents, concertgoers at the amphitheater were treated to appearances by leading performers from the world of Jazz, Classical music and Opera.

Several noted conductors appeared at the stadium in concert with the Lewisohn Stadium Symphony Orchestra, the New York Philharmonic and the Metropolitan Opera Orchestra. Kurt Adler and Alfredo Antonini conducted a series of open-air summer concerts at the stadium for three decades during the 1940s, 1950s and 1960s, many conducted by . His Italian Night concerts often attracted an audience of over 13,000 guests for a single performance and featured noted soloists from the operatic stage including Licia Albanese and Richard Tucker. Both Leonard Bernstein of the New York Philharmonic and Kurt Adler of the Metropolitan Opera also made appearances at the stadium as conductors. Guest appearances were also made at the stadium's podium by: Pierre Boulez, Andre Kostelanetz, Henry Lewis. Dimitri Mitropoulos, Julius Rudel, Alexander Smallens, Max Steiner, Alfred Wallenstein, and Mark Warnow.

Over the decades, a wide variety of noted soloists also appeared at the amphitheater including: Marian Anderson, Louis Armstrong, Harry Belafonte, Jack Benny, Leonard Bernstein, Jorge Bolet, Van Cliburn, Placido Domingo, Joan Field, Ella Fitzgerald, Kirsten Flagstad, Benny Goodman, Thomas Hayward, Jascha Heifetz, William Kapell, Lotte Lenya, Yehudi Menuhin, Jan Peerce, Roberta Peters, Leontyne Price, Paul Robeson. Pete Seeger, Frank Sinatra, Renata Tebaldi, Richard Tucker and Yma Sumac

The orchestra conductors Eugene Ormandy and Leopold Stokowski each made a series of recordings for Everest with the "Stadium Symphony Orchestra of New York." George Gershwin played his Rhapsody in Blue, and premiered his Cuban Overture at the stadium as well.

Due to declining attendances, the regularly scheduled concerts were discontinued in 1966.

== Other uses ==
The stadium was used by City College for its commencement exercises. All CCNY campuses took part, including Liberal Arts, Engineering and Architecture, and its Manhattan Business School (now Baruch College). This practice continued through June 1973. (Graduation ceremonies for the class of 1969 were held at the Felt Forum of Madison Square Garden.)

External videos
- Photograph of Lewisohn Stadium from the air at C.U.N.Y on Getty Images; Here on Getty images

It was also used for CCNY's annual Army ROTC's reviews at the end of each academic year.

On August 16, 1946, the stadium was the site of a benefit concert for Sergeant Isaac Woodard, an African-American soldier in the U.S. Army who, upon being honorably discharged and returning home from service in the Pacific theater of World War II, had been brutally attacked and blinded with a blackjack by a white police officer in South Carolina earlier that year. The sold-out concert, organized by the New York Amsterdam News as the atrocity was gaining national attention, included performances by musicians Nat King Cole, Cab Calloway, Duke Ellington, Carol Brice, Woody Guthrie, and Billie Holiday. Orson Welles, who had helped to publicize the cruel attack on his radio program and in his New York Post column, also attended, and the event was co-chaired by boxer Joe Louis and New York City Mayor William O'Dwyer.

== On television ==
In 1950 a summer series of live concerts was broadcast from the stadium on NBC television. It featured the New York Philharmonic Orchestra.

== In film ==
The stadium appeared as the setting of the final scene of the 1945 film Rhapsody in Blue in which Oscar Levant performs the title composition, with an orchestra conducted by Paul Whiteman, as a memorial to the composer. The derelict stadium was also used in the 1973 film Serpico, directed by Sidney Lumet, in a scene with Tony Roberts and Al Pacino.
