= Ruel Ross Appleton =

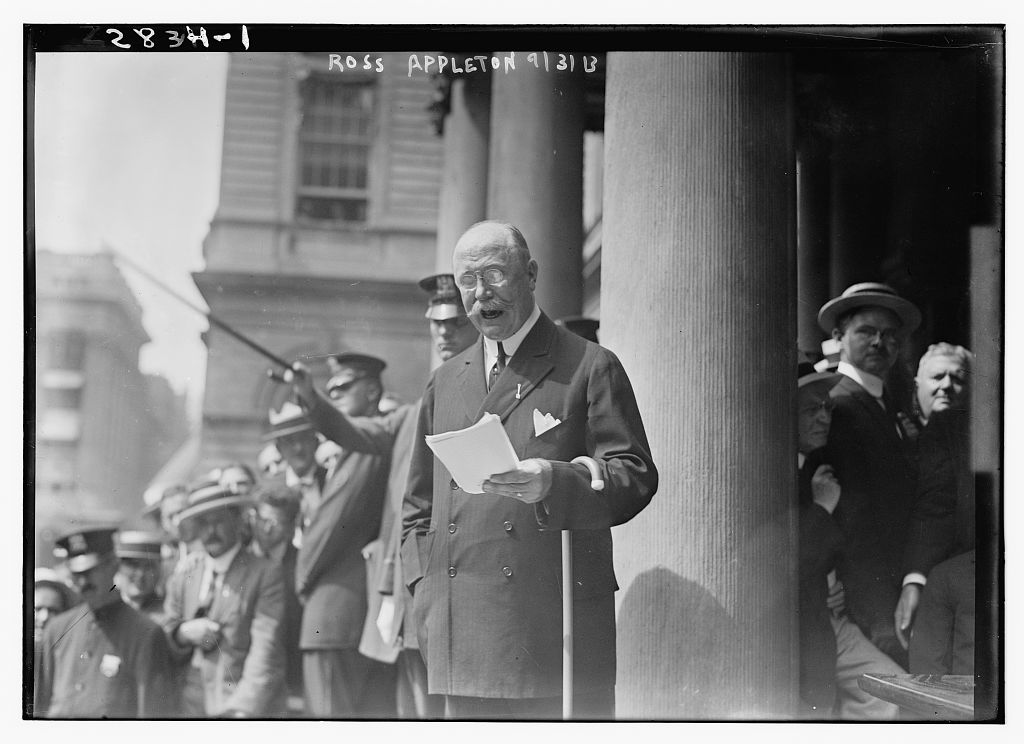
Ruel Ross Appleton in 1913

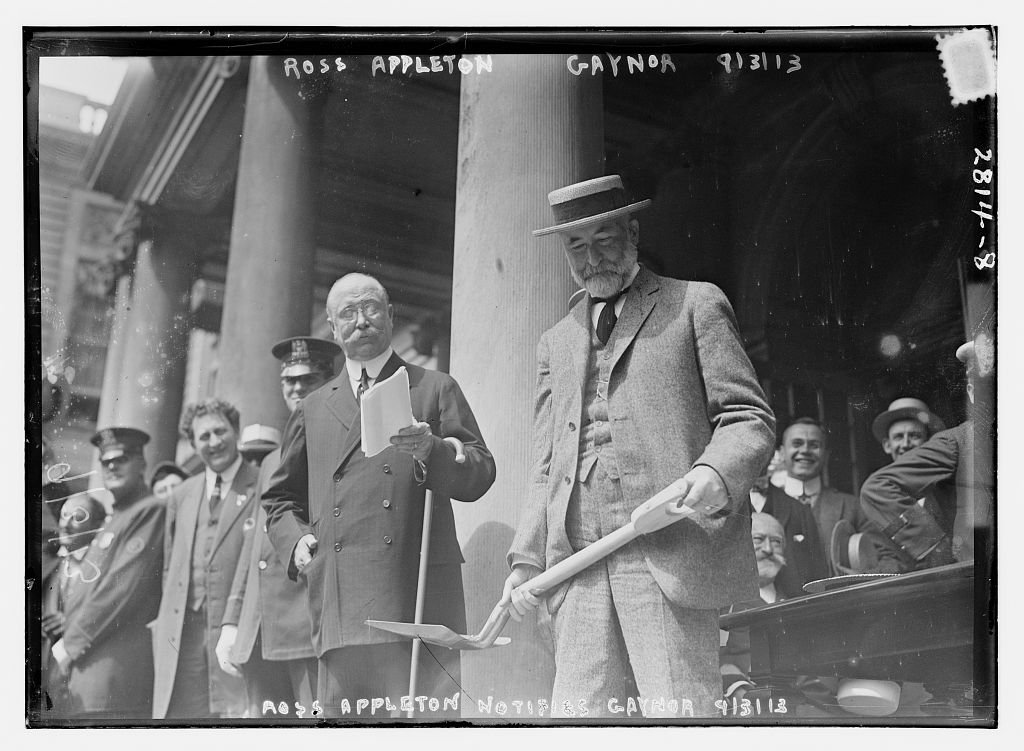
Ruel Ross Appleton and William Jay Gaynor in 1913

Ruel Ross Appleton Sr. (June 18, 1853 – February 13, 1928) of Brooklyn was a cotton goods broker and banker.

== Biography ==
Ruel Ross Appleton was born in Industry, Pennsylvania on June 18, 1853.

In 1901 he supported Alfred T. White. In 1913 he was the Chairman of the Gaynor Nominating Committee and Chairman of the Gaynor Fusion Nominating League in 1913. Under these titles he worked as the campaign manager for William Jay Gaynor of New York City. He died at his home in Brooklyn on February 13, 1928.
