= Katherine Verdery =

American anthropologist and author

Katherine Verdery (born 1948) is an American anthropologist, author, and emeritus professor, following her tenure as the Julien J. Studley Faculty Scholar and Distinguished Professor at the Graduate Center of the City University of New York.

== Career ==
She used to be the Eric R. Wolf Professor of Anthropology and Director of the Center for Russian and East European Studies at the University of Michigan (1997–2005), following twenty years as an assistant/associate professor of anthropology at the Johns Hopkins University (1977–1997).

Verdery played a number of important roles in academic research institutions. The first anthropologist to be elected to the presidency of the National Association for Slavic, East European, and Eurasian Studies (2004–2006), she also held important advisory positions (such as on the Board of Overseers, Harvard University, and the Board of Electors, William Wyse Professorship and Chair of Social Anthropology, Cambridge University). From 1987 to 1990 she was the American Anthropological Association's representative to the American Council of Learned Societies / Soviet Academy of Sciences Commission on Ethnography, and from 1989 to 1990 she was the vice president of the Romanian Studies Society. She served on the National Council for Soviet and East European Research as trustee (1989–1996), an executive board member (1991–1993), and chair of the board (1995–1996). From 2002 to 2005, she was a member of the executive board of the Social Science Research Council, as a representative for anthropology. She also served on the boards of the American Anthropological Association and the American Ethnological Society.

== Academics ==
Among the first anthropologists to conduct research behind the Iron Curtain, Verdery spent an extended period working in Romania in the 1970s–1980s. From this research she published eight books and numerous articles, as well as several edited collections, all informed by her theoretical model of socialism. Her work placed her in the forefront of scholars of the socialist system, both in anthropology and more broadly. Her primary themes were ethno-national identity; the political economy of Romania before, during, and after socialism; property relations; and ethnography in the archives of the communist-era Romanian Secret Police, a topic she pioneered.

Having worked in Romania for an extended period in the 1970s–1980s, she was extensively surveilled by the Securitate under the Ceaușescu regime, which incorrectly suspected her of spying. After Ceaușescu's fall, she was able to view her surveillance files through the National Council for the Study of the Securitate Archives (CNSAS).

Her book My Life as a Spy: Investigations in a Secret Police File describes the files' contents and her reactions to seeing them. Among others, Journalist Neal Ascherson reviewed Verdery's book (ISBN 9780822370819, May 2018) in the London Review of Books in July 2018.

== Books ==
- Transylvanian Villagers: Three Centuries of Political, Economic, and Ethnic Change, University of California Press (1983).
- National Ideology under Socialism: Identity and Cultural Politics in Ceausescu's Romania, Princeton University Press (1991).
- What was Socialism, and What Comes Next?, Princeton University Press (1996).
- The Political Lives of Dead Bodies, Columbia University Press (1999).
- The Vanishing Hectare: Property and Value in Postsocialist Transylvania, Cornell University Press (2003).
- Peasants under Siege: The Collectivization of Romanian Agriculture, 1949–1962 (with Gail Kligman), Princeton University Press (2011).
- Secrets and Truths: Ethnography in the Archive of the Romanian Secret Police, East European University Press (2014).
- My Life as a Spy: Investigations in a Secret Police File, Duke University Press (2018).
