= Randolph Guggenheimer (politician) =

American businessman, acting mayor of New York

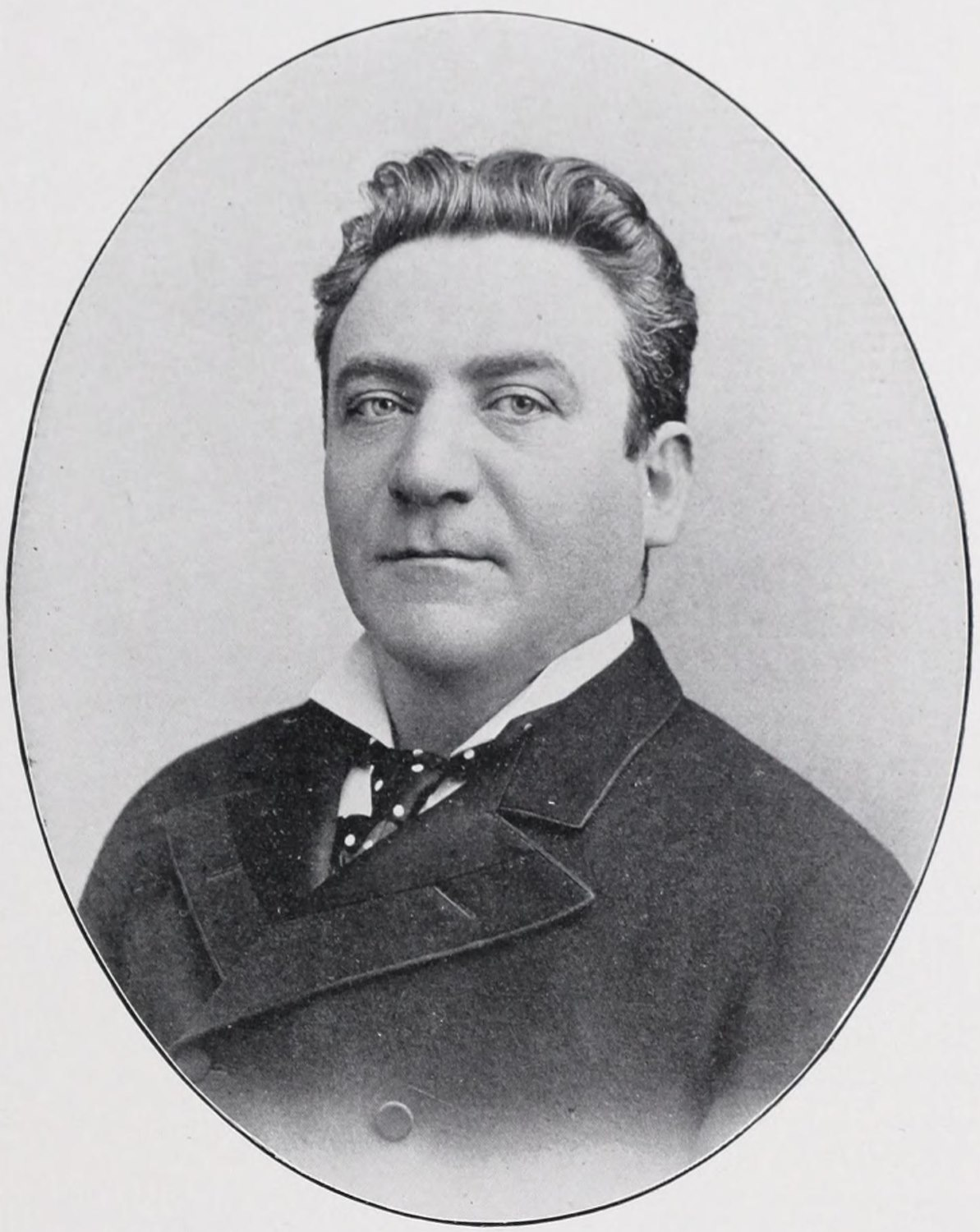
- Guggenheimer in 1899

President of the New York City Council
- In office January 1, 1898 – December 31, 1901
- Preceded by: Position established
- Succeeded by: Position abolished, Charles V. Fornes as President of the Board of Aldermen

Personal details
- Born: July 20, 1846 Lynchburg, Virginia, U.S.
- Died: September 12, 1907 (aged 60–61) Elberon, New Jersey, U.S.
- Party: Democratic
- Spouse: Eliza Katzenberg (m. 1875)
- Children: 3

Randolph Guggenheimer (July 20, 1846 – September 12, 1907) was an American politician in New York City who served as the inaugural President of the Council of the City of Greater New York from 1898 through 1901.

== Life and career ==
Randolph Guggenheimer was born on July 20, 1846, in Lynchburg, Virginia. He was Jewish, and a philanthropist towards many Jewish causes. He married Eliza Katzenberg in 1875, and together they had three children: Charles, Harry and Adele.

He died on September 12, 1907, at his summer home in Elberon, New Jersey.

The Aviary (Lynchburg, Virginia) was a gift to Lynchburg, Virginia from Randolph Guggenheimer, born at Lynchburg, later of New York City.
