= List of colleges and universities in New York (state) =

The following is a list of public and private institutions of higher education currently operating in the state of New York. See List of defunct colleges and universities in New York (state) for institutions that once existed but have since closed.

== Public ==
=== Federal ===
- United States Merchant Marine Academy (Kings Point)
- United States Military Academy (West Point)

=== State University of New York (SUNY) ===
- SUNY University Centers
  - Binghamton University
  - Stony Brook University
  - University at Albany
  - University at Buffalo
- SUNY Specialized Doctoral Granting Units
  - State University of New York Upstate Medical University
  - State University of New York College of Environmental Science and Forestry
  - State University of New York College of Optometry
  - SUNY Downstate Health Sciences University
  - SUNY Polytechnic Institute (Marcy)
- SUNY Technology Colleges
  - Alfred State College
  - Farmingdale State College
  - State University of New York at Canton
  - State University of New York at Cobleskill
  - State University of New York at Delhi
  - State University of New York at Morrisville
  - State University of New York Maritime College
- SUNY Comprehensive Colleges
  - Buffalo State University
  - Purchase College
  - State University of New York at Brockport
  - State University of New York at Cortland
  - State University of New York at Fredonia
  - State University of New York at Geneseo
  - State University of New York at New Paltz
  - State University of New York at Old Westbury
  - State University of New York at Oneonta
  - State University of New York at Oswego
  - State University of New York at Plattsburgh
  - State University of New York at Potsdam
- SUNY Statutory Colleges
  - New York State College of Ceramics at Alfred University
  - New York State College of Agriculture and Life Sciences at Cornell University
  - New York State College of Human Ecology at Cornell University
  - New York State College of Veterinary Medicine at Cornell University
  - New York State School of Industrial and Labor Relations at Cornell University
- SUNY Community Colleges
  - Cayuga Community College
  - Clinton Community College
  - Columbia–Greene Community College
  - Corning Community College
  - Dutchess Community College
  - Fashion Institute of Technology (Chelsea, Manhattan)
  - Finger Lakes Community College
  - Fulton–Montgomery Community College
  - Genesee Community College
  - Herkimer County Community College
  - Hudson Valley Community College
  - Jamestown Community College
  - Jefferson Community College
  - Mohawk Valley Community College
  - Monroe Community College
  - Nassau Community College
  - North Country Community College
  - Onondaga Community College
  - Rockland Community College
  - Schenectady County Community College
  - Suffolk County Community College
  - SUNY Adirondack
  - SUNY Broome Community College
  - SUNY Erie
  - SUNY Niagara
  - SUNY Orange
  - SUNY Sullivan
  - SUNY Ulster
  - Tompkins Cortland Community College
  - Westchester Community College
- SUNY State-wide Colleges
  - Empire State University

=== City University of New York (CUNY) ===
- CUNY Senior Colleges and Graduate Schools
  - Baruch College (Gramercy Park)
  - Brooklyn College
  - City College of New York (Harlem)
  - College of Staten Island
  - Craig Newmark Graduate School of Journalism at the City University of New York (Midtown Manhattan)
  - CUNY Graduate Center
  - CUNY Graduate School of Public Health and Health Policy
  - CUNY School of Law (Long Island City)
  - CUNY School of Medicine
  - CUNY School of Professional Studies
  - Hunter College (Upper East Side)
  - John Jay College of Criminal Justice (Midtown Manhattan)
  - Lehman College (The Bronx)
  - Medgar Evers College (Crown Heights, Brooklyn)
  - New York City College of Technology (Downtown Brooklyn)
  - Queens College (Flushing)
  - William E. Macaulay Honors College
  - York College (Jamaica, Queens)
- CUNY Community Colleges
  - Borough of Manhattan Community College (Tribeca)
  - Bronx Community College (University Heights, Bronx)
  - Guttman Community College (Midtown Manhattan)
  - Hostos Community College (South Bronx)
  - Kingsborough Community College (Manhattan Beach, Brooklyn)
  - LaGuardia Community College (Long Island City)
  - Queensborough Community College (Bayside, Queens)

== Private, not-for-profit, non-sectarian ==
- Adelphi University (Garden City)
- The Ailey School, Alvin Ailey American Dance Theater
- Albany College of Pharmacy and Health Sciences
- Albany Law School
- Albany Medical College
- Alfred University (Alfred)
- American Academy McAllister Institute of Funeral Service
- American Academy of Dramatic Arts
- American Museum of Natural History
  - Richard Gilder Graduate School (Upper West Side)
- American Musical and Dramatic Academy
- Bank Street College of Education (Morningside Heights, Manhattan)
- Barnard College (Morningside Heights, Manhattan)
- Boricua College
- Boston Graduate School of Psychoanalysis - New York
- Brooklyn Law School (Brooklyn Heights)
- Bryant & Stratton College, Albany/Buffalo/Syracuse/Rochester/Online
- Clarkson University (Potsdam)
- Cold Spring Harbor Laboratory School of Biological Sciences (North Shore, Long Island)
- Colgate University (Hamilton)
- Columbia University (Morningside Heights)
  - Teachers College
- Cooper Union (East Village, Manhattan)
- Cornell University (Ithaca)
  - Cornell Tech (Manhattan)
  - Weill Cornell Graduate School of Medical Sciences (Manhattan)
  - Weill Cornell Medicine (Upper East Side)
- Culinary Institute of America
  - Hyde Park campus (Hyde Park)
- Daemen University (Amherst)
- Elmezzi Graduate School of Molecular Medicine
- Elmira College (Elmira)
- Excelsior University (Albany)
- Gerstner Sloan Kettering Graduate School of Biomedical Science
- Hamilton College (Clinton)
- Hartwick College (Oneonta)
- Hofstra University (Hempstead)
- Ithaca College
- Juilliard School (Manhattan)
- Keuka College (Keuka Park)
- Lake Erie College of Osteopathic Medicine (Elmira branch campus)
- Long Island University
  - LIU Post (Brookville)
  - LIU Brooklyn
- Manhattan School of Music (Morningside Heights)
- Manhattanville University (Purchase)
- Marist University (Poughkeepsie)
- Mercy University
  - Dobbs Ferry (main campus)
  - Manhattan at 47 West 34th Street (extension campus)
  - The Bronx (extension campus)
- Metropolitan College of New York (The Bronx)
- Mount Sinai Health System
  - Icahn School of Medicine at Mount Sinai (Upper East Side, Manhattan)
  - Mount Sinai Phillips School of Nursing (PSON)
- Nazareth University (Pittsford, near Rochester)
- New York Academy of Art
- New York College of Health Professions
- New York College of Traditional Chinese Medicine
- New York Institute of Technology (Old Westbury & Columbus Circle, Manhattan)
- New York Law School
- New York School of Interior Design
- New York University (Greenwich Village, Manhattan)
- Northeast College of Health Sciences (Seneca Falls)
- Pace University (Manhattan, Pleasantville, White Plains)
- Paul Smith's College (Paul Smiths)
- Pratt Institute (Clinton Hill, Brooklyn)
  - Munson-Williams-Proctor Arts Institute (Utica)
- Relay Graduate School of Education (Manhattan)
- Rensselaer Polytechnic Institute (Troy)
- Rochester Institute of Technology (Henrietta)
- Rockefeller University (Manhattan)
- Russell Sage College (Albany and Troy)
- St. John Fisher University (Pittsford)
- St. Lawrence University (Canton)
- Sarah Lawrence College (Yonkers)
- Skidmore College (Saratoga Springs)
- Syracuse University (Syracuse)
- The New School (Lower Manhattan)
- University of Rochester (Rochester)
- Union College (Schenectady)
- Utica University (Utica)
- Vassar College (Poughkeepsie)
- Vaughn College of Aeronautics and Technology (East Elmhurst, Queens)
- Webb Institute (Glen Cove)

== Private, for-profit ==
- Berkeley College (Midtown Manhattan/Brooklyn)
- College of Westchester (White Plains)
- DeVry University
  - Keller Graduate School of Management
- Five Towns College (Dix Hills)
- LIM College (Midtown Manhattan)
- Mandl College of Allied Health
- Mildred Elley
- Monroe University (The Bronx/New Rochelle)
- New York Automotive and Diesel Institute
- New York Film Academy (Manhattan)
- New York School for Medical & Dental Assistants
- Pacific College of Health and Science
- Plaza College
- School of Visual Arts
- Sotheby's Institute of Art
- Swedish Institute College of Health Sciences

== Nursing colleges and schools ==
- AMG School of Nursing
- Arnot Ogden Medical Center
- The Belanger School of Nursing
- Cochran School of Nursing
- Finger Lakes Health College of Nursing and Health Sciences
- Helene Fuld College of Nursing (Harlem)
- Maria College of Albany
- Montefiore School of Nursing
- Mount Sinai Phillips School of Nursing
- Pomeroy College of Nursing at Crouse Hospital (Syracuse)
- Saint Elizabeth College of Nursing (Utica)
- St. Joseph's College of Nursing, Syracuse
- St Paul’s School of Nursing, Queens and Staten Island
- St. Peter’s Hospital College of Nursing, Albany
- Samaritan Hospital School of Nursing, Albany

== Private, religious ==
=== Armenian Apostolic Church ===
- St. Nersess Armenian Seminary

=== Eastern Orthodox ===
==== Orthodox Church in America ====
- St. Vladimir's Orthodox Theological Seminary, Yonkers

==== Russian Orthodox Church Outside Russia ====
- Holy Trinity Orthodox Seminary (Jordanville)

=== Falun Gong ===
- Fei Tian College

=== Jewish ===
- Albert Einstein College of Medicine (Morris Park, Bronx)
- Elyon College (Brooklyn)

==== Conservative ====
- Jewish Theological Seminary of America (Morningside Heights)

==== Hasidic ====
Aleksander

- Congregation Talmidei Mesivta Tiferes Shmiel Aleksander (Brooklyn)

Belz

- Yeshiva of Machzikai Hadas (Brooklyn)

Bixad

- Yeshiva Kollel Tifereth Elizer (Brooklyn)

Bobov

- Rabbinical College Bobover Yeshiva Bnei Zion (Brooklyn)
- Talmudical Seminary of Bobov (Brooklyn)

Chabad

- Talmudical Seminary Oholei Torah (Brooklyn)
- Central Yeshiva Tomchei Tmimim Lubavitz (Brooklyn)

Ger

- Machzikei Hadath Rabbinical College (Brooklyn)

Karlin-Stolin

- Yeshiva Karlin Stolin (Brooklyn)

Kasho

- Yeshiva of Kasho

Nitra

- Yeshiva of Nitra Rabbinical College (Chester, Orange County, New York)

Non-dynastic

- Yeshiva D’monsey Rabbinical College (Monsey)
- Yeshiva Gedola Amidei Dgirsa (Brooklyn)

Novominsk

- Yeshivas Novominsk (Brooklyn)

Pupa

- Kehilath Yakov Rabbinical Seminary (Ossing)

Rachmastrivka

- Eisek HaTorah D’Rachmistrivka (Staten Island)

Satmar

- United Talmudical Seminary (Brooklyn)
- Uta Mesivta of Kiryas Joel (Monroe)
- Yeshiva and Kollel of Karlsburg (Brooklyn)

Skver

- Be’er Yaakov Talmudic Seminary (Spring Valley)

Spinka

- Yeshiva Gedolah Imrei Yosef D’spinka (Brooklyn)

Visnitz

- Yeshivath Viznitz (Monsey)
- Ohel Margulia Seminary (Monsey)

==== Modern Orthodox ====
- New York Seminary (Brooklyn)
- Sh'or Yoshuv Rabbinical College (Lawrence)
- Touro University (Manhattan)
  - New York College of Podiatric Medicine
  - New York Medical College (Valhalla)
  - Law Center (Central Islip)
  - College of Osteopathic Medicine (Harlem)
  - Lander College for Men (Kew Gardens Hills, Queens)
  - Lander College for Women – The Anna Ruth and Mark Hasten School (Upper East Side)
- Yeshiva University
  - Stern College for Women (Murray Hill, Manhattan)
  - Yeshiva College (Washington Heights, Manhattan)
  - Sy Syms School of Business (Washington Heights, Manhattan)
  - Rabbi Isaac Elchanan Theological Seminary
  - Benjamin N. Cardozo School of Law

==== Reform ====
- Academy for Jewish Religion (Yonkers)
- Hebrew Union College-Jewish Institute of Religion (Greenwich Village)
  - The Debbie Friedman School of Sacred Music

==== Yeshivish ====
- Bais Binyomin Academy (Monsey)
- Bais Medrash of Dexter Park (Chestnut Ridge)
- Beis Medrash Heichal Dovid (Far Rockaway)
- Bet Medrash Gadol Ateret Torah (Brooklyn)
- Beth Hamedrash Shaarei Yosher Institute (Brooklyn)
- Beth Medrash Elyon (Monsey)
- Beth Medrash Meor Yitzchok (Monsey)
- Central Yeshiva Beth Joseph (Brooklyn)
- Mechon L’hoyroa (Monsey)
- Mesivta of Eastern Parkway-Yeshiva Zichron Meilech (Brooklyn)
- Mesivta Torah Vodaath Seminary (Brooklyn)
- Mesivtha Tifereth Jerusalem of America (Manhattan)
- Mirrer Yeshiva Central Institute (Brooklyn)
- Ohr Hameir Theological Seminary (Peeskill)
- Rabbinical Academy Mesivta Rabbi Chaim Berlin (Brooklyn)
- Rabbinical College Beth Shraga, (Monsey)
- Rabbinical College of Long Island (Long Beach)
- Rabbinical College of Ohr Shimon Yisroel (Brooklyn)
- Rabbinical College Ohr Yisroel (Brooklyn)
- Seminar L'moros Bais Yaakov (Brooklyn)
- Yeshiva of Rochester (Rochester)
- Torah Temimah Talmudical Seminary (Staten Island)
- Yeshiva Derech Chaim (Brooklyn)
- Yeshiva of Far Rockaway Derech Ayson (Far Rockaway)
- Yeshiva Gedolah Kesser Torah (Monsey)
- Yeshiva Gedolah Zichron Moshe (South Fallsburg)
- Yeshiva of Ocean (Greenfield Park)
- Yeshiva Ohr Naftoli (New Windsor)
- Yeshiva Ohr Yisrael (Brooklyn)
- Yeshiva Shaar Ephraim (Monsey)
- Yeshiva Shaar Hatorah (Kew Gardens)
- Yeshiva Shaarei Torah of Rockland (Suffern)
- Yeshiva Sholom Shachna (Brooklyn)
- Yeshiva of Telshe Alumni (Riverdale)
- Yeshiva Yesoda Hatorah Vetz Chaim (Brooklyn)
- Yeshiva Zichron Aryeh (Far Rockaway)
- Yeshivas Chofetz Chaim (Flushing)
- Yeshivat Hechal Shemuel (Brooklyn)

=== Protestant ===
==== Baptist ====
- Colgate Rochester Crozer Divinity School – American Baptist Churches USA
- Davis College (Pottersville) – Southern Baptist Convention

==== Episcopal ====
- Bard College (Annandale-on-Hudson, New York)
  - Bard Graduate Center (New York City)
- General Theological Seminary (Chelsea, Manhattan)
- Hobart and William Smith Colleges (Geneva)

==== Evangelical ====
- Elim Bible College (Lima)

==== Lutheran ====
- Wagner College (Staten Island)

==== Methodist ====
- Roberts Wesleyan University (Chili, near Rochester)

==== Non-denominational ====
- Union Theological Seminary (Morningside Heights)

==== Pentecostal ====
- Northeast Institute of Biblical and Theological Studies (Corinth)

==== Wesleyan ====
- Houghton University (Houghton)

=== Catholic ===
==== Christian Brothers ====
- Iona University (New Rochelle)

==== Congregation of the Mission ====
- Niagara University (Lewiston)
- St. John's University

==== De La Salle Brothers ====
- Manhattan University (The Bronx)

==== Diocesan ====
- St. Joseph's Seminary and College (Dunwoodie, Yonkers)
- St. Bernard's School of Theology and Ministry, Rochester

==== Dominican Sisters of Blauvelt ====
- Dominican University New York (Orangeburg)
- Molloy University (Rockville Centre)
- Mount Saint Mary College (Newburgh)

==== Dominican Sisters of Sparkill ====
- St. Thomas Aquinas College (Sparkill)

==== Felician Sisters ====
- Villa Maria College (Buffalo)

==== Franciscan ====
- Hilbert College (Hamburg)
- Siena University (Loudonville)
- St. Bonaventure University (Allegany)
- St. Francis College (Brooklyn Heights)

==== Grey Nuns ====
- D'Youville University (Buffalo)

==== Jesuit ====
- Canisius University (Buffalo)
- Le Moyne College (Syracuse)
- Fordham University
  - Rose Hill campus (The Bronx)
  - Lincoln Center campus (Manhattan)

==== Sisters of Charity of New York ====
- University of Mount Saint Vincent (Riverdale)

==== Sisters of Mercy ====
- Maria College (Albany)
- Trocaire College (Buffalo)

==== Sisters of St. Joseph ====
- St. Joseph's University

== See also ==
- Education in New York (state)
- List of colleges and universities in New York City
- City University of New York
- List of City University of New York institutions
- State University of New York
- List of State University of New York units
- List of honors colleges and programs in New York
- List of college athletic programs in New York
- List of defunct colleges and universities in New York (state)
- Higher education in the United States
- List of American institutions of higher education
- List of recognized higher education accreditation organizations
- List of colleges and universities
