= University of New York =

There is no real institution in the United States that bears the exact name University of New York. However, it is possible that such a reference may be used for one of the following:

== In New York State ==
- New York University, a private research university in New York City, originally named the University of the City of New York
  - University of New York (Felicity), a fictional university from the American TV series Felicity loosely based on New York University
- State University of New York, a multi-campus public university system of the state
  - University at Buffalo
- City University of New York, a multi-campus public university system of the city
- University of the State of New York, the State of New York's governmental umbrella organization that oversees all educational institutions

For a more comprehensive list of universities and other educational institutions in the State of New York or New York City, see any of the following articles:

- List of colleges and universities in New York City
- List of colleges and universities in New York (state)
- Education in New York City
- Education in New York (state)

== Outside the United States ==
- University of New York in Prague, Czech Republic
- University of New York, Tirana, Albania

== See also ==
- College of the City of New York (disambiguation)
- New York College (disambiguation)
