= List of honors programs and colleges in the United States =

The following is a partial list of honors colleges and programs in the United States.

Index
State: Alabama | Alaska | Arizona | Arkansas | California | Colorado | Connecticut | Delaware | District of Columbia | Florida | Georgia | Hawaii | Idaho | Illinois | Indiana | Iowa | Kansas | Kentucky | Louisiana | Maine | Maryland | Massachusetts | Michigan | Minnesota | Mississippi | Missouri | Montana | Nebraska | Nevada | New Hampshire | New Jersey | New Mexico | New York | North Carolina | North Dakota | Ohio | Oklahoma | Oregon | Pennsylvania | Rhode Island | South Carolina | South Dakota | Tennessee | Texas | Utah | Vermont | Virginia | Washington | West Virginia | Wisconsin | Wyoming

== Alabama ==
(Related: List of colleges and universities in Alabama)

- Alabama A&M University: Honors Program
- Alabama State University: W.E.B. DuBois Honors Program
- Auburn University: Honors College
- Samford University: University Fellows honors program
- Tuskegee University: Honors Program
- University of Alabama: Honors College
- University of Alabama at Birmingham: Honors College
- University of Alabama in Huntsville: Honors College

== Alaska ==
(Related: List of colleges and universities in Alaska)

- University of Alaska Anchorage: Honors College
- University of Alaska Fairbanks: UAF Honors College

== Arizona ==
(Related: List of colleges and universities in Arizona)

- Arizona State University: Barrett, The Honors College
- University of Arizona: The Honors College

== Arkansas ==
(Related: List of colleges and universities in Arkansas)

- University of Arkansas: University of Arkansas Honors College
- University of Central Arkansas: Norbert O. Schedler Honors College

== California ==
(Related: List of colleges and universities in California)

- Azusa Pacific University Honors College
- California Lutheran University Honors Program
- California Polytechnic State University University Honors Program
- California State University, Chico Honors Program
- California State University, Fresno Honors College
- California State University, Sacramento Honors Program
- San Diego State University Honors Program
- San Jose State University Humanities Honors Program
- Biola University Torrey Honors Institute
- University of California, Davis Honors Program
- University of California, Los Angeles Honors Program
- University of California, Riverside Honors Program
- University of California, San Diego Honors College-Muir Honors College-Revelle
- University of California, Santa Barbara Honors Program
- University of California, Santa Cruz College Scholars Program
- University of California, Irvine UC Irvine Campuswide Honors Program
- University of San Diego Honors Program
- La Sierra University Honors Program

== Colorado ==
(Related: List of colleges and universities in Colorado)

- Regis University
- Colorado State University Honors Program
- Metropolitan State University of Denver Honors Program
- University of Colorado Honors Program
- University of Denver Honors Program
- University of Colorado Colorado Springs Honors Program (UCCS-Honors)

== Connecticut ==
(Related: List of colleges and universities in Connecticut)

- Central Connecticut State University
- Eastern Connecticut State University
- Southern Connecticut State University
- University of Connecticut Honors Program
- Western Connecticut State University

== Delaware ==
(Related: List of colleges and universities in Delaware)

- University of Delaware Honors Program

== District of Columbia ==
(Related: List of colleges and universities in Washington, D.C.)

- Georgetown University's Landegger Honors Program in International Business Diplomacy (IBD)
- Gallaudet University's Honors Program
- American University's Honors Program
- Catholic University of America's University Honors Program
- George Washington University's University Honors Program (UHP)
- Howard University College of Arts and Sciences's Honors Program

== Florida ==
(Related: List of colleges and universities in Florida)

=== Public institutions ===
- Burnett Honors College University of Central Florida
- Florida A&M University Honors Program
- Florida Atlantic University Harriet L. Wilkes Honors College
- Florida International University Honors College
- Florida State University Honors Program
- New College of Florida (the institution is an honors college, itself)
- St. Petersburg College Honors College
- University of Florida Honors Program
- University of South Florida Judy Genshaft Honors College
- University of West Florida Kugelman Honors Program
- Miami Dade College Honors College

=== Private Institutions ===
- Flagler College Honors Program
- Nova Southeastern University Honors College
- Rollins College Honors Program
- Southeastern University School of Honors

== Georgia ==
(Related: List of colleges and universities in Georgia)

- University of Georgia, UGA Honors College
- Albany State University, Albany State Honors Program
- Columbus State University, Honors College
- Clark Atlanta University, CAU Honors Program
- Fort Valley State University Fort Valley Honors Program
- Kennesaw State University, Kenesaw Honors College
- Georgia Southern University, Georgia Southern Honors Program
- Georgia Institute of Technology, Georgia Tech Honors Program
- Georgia State University, Georgia State Honors College
- Savannah State University, Savanah State Honors Program

== Hawaii ==
(Related: List of colleges and universities in Hawaii)

- University of Hawaii at Manoa Honors Program

== Idaho ==
(Related: List of colleges and universities in Idaho)

University of Idaho

Boise State University

== Illinois ==
(Related: List of colleges and universities in Illinois)

- Augustana College Honors Program
- Northern Illinois University Honors Program
- University of Illinois at Chicago Honors College
- Western Illinois University Centennial Honors College
- Southern Illinois University Carbondale
- Roosevelt University (Honors Program)

== Indiana ==
(Related: List of colleges and universities in Indiana)

- Indiana University Bloomington Hutton Honors College
- Valparaiso University Christ College Honors College
- Purdue University, Purdue Honors College
- Indiana Wesleyan University, John Wesley Honors College
- Ball State University, https://www.bsu.edu/academics/collegesanddepartments/honorscollege Ball State University Honors College

== Iowa ==
(Related: List of colleges and universities in Iowa)

- Dordt University Kuyper Scholars Program
- Iowa State University Honors Program
- Loras College Loras College Honors Program
- University of Iowa Honors Program

== Kansas ==
- Kansas State University Honors Program
- University of Kansas Honors Program

== Kentucky ==
(Related: List of colleges and universities in Kentucky)

- Eastern Kentucky University Honors Program
- Georgetown College Honors Program
- University of Kentucky Lewis Honors College
- Western Kentucky University Honors College
- Kentucky State University Whitney Young Honors School

== Louisiana ==
(Related: List of colleges and universities in Louisiana)

- Grambling State University Earl Lester Cole Honors College
- Louisiana Scholars' College
- Louisiana State University Honors College
- LSU New Orleans Honors Program
- McNeese State University Honors College
- Nicholls State University Honors Program
- Northwestern State University
1. Honors Program
2. Louisiana Scholars' College
- Southeastern Louisiana University Honors Program
- Southern University Honors College
- Tulane University Newcomb-Tulane College
- University of Louisiana at Lafayette Honors Program
- University of Louisiana at Monroe Honors Program

== Maine ==
(Related: List of colleges and universities in Maine)

- University of Maine, Honors College
- University of New England, Honors Program

== Maryland ==
(Related: List of colleges and universities in Maryland)

- Morgan State University, Honors College
- University of Maryland, Baltimore County Honors College
- University of Maryland Honors College
- Salisbury University Clarke Honors College
- St. Mary's College of Maryland The Public Honors College
- Towson University Honors Program

== Massachusetts ==
(Related: List of colleges and universities in Massachusetts)

- Boston University Kilachand Honors College
- University of Massachusetts Amherst Commonwealth Honors College
- University of Massachusetts Lowell Honors College

== Michigan ==
(Related: List of colleges and universities in Michigan)

- Albion College, Prentiss M. Brown Honors Program
- Ferris State University Honors Program
- Grand Valley State University Frederik Meijer Honors College
- Michigan State University Honors College
- Oakland University Honors College
- Pavlis Honors College at Michigan Technological University
- University of Michigan- Ann Arbor

- University of Michigan-Dearborn Honors Program
- Wayne State University Irving D. Reid Honors College
- Western Michigan University Lee Honors College

== Minnesota ==
(Related: List of colleges and universities in Minnesota)

- University of Minnesota, Honors Program
- Southwest Minnesota State University, Honors Program
- Hamline University, Honors Program
- Minnesota State University, Mankato, Honors Program
- Bemidji State University, Honors Program

== Mississippi ==
(Related: List of colleges and universities in Mississippi)

- Alcorn State University Honors Program
- Jackson State University Honors College
- Mississippi State University Judy and Bobby Shackouls Honors College
- Sally McDonnell Barksdale Honors College
- University of Southern Mississippi Honors College

== Missouri ==
(Related: List of colleges and universities in Missouri)

- University of Missouri, Honors Program
- University of Missouri–Kansas City, Honors Program
- University of Missouri–St. Louis Pierre Laclede Honors College
- Drury University, Honors Program
- Rockhurst University, Honors Program
- Southeast Missouri State University Jane Stephens Honors Program

== Montana ==
(Related: List of colleges and universities in Montana)

- University of Montana Davidson Honors College

== Nebraska ==
(Related: List of colleges and universities in Nebraska)

- University of Nebraska-Kearney, Honors Program
- University of Nebraska–Lincoln, Honors Program
- University of Nebraska Omaha, Honors Program
- Creighton University, Honors Program
- Hastings College, Honors Program
- Doane University, Honors Program
- Midland University, Howard Hanson Honors Program
- College of Saint Mary, Walk Tall Honors Program
- Wayne State College, Honors Program
- Concordia University Nebraska, Luke Scholars Honors Program

== Nevada ==
(Related: List of colleges and universities in Nevada)

- University of Nevada, Las Vegas, Honors College
- University of Nevada, Reno, Honors Program

== New Hampshire ==
(Related: List of colleges and universities in New Hampshire)

- Saint Anselm College, Honors Program
- Southern New Hampshire University, Honors Program
- University of New Hampshire, Honors Program

== New Jersey ==
(Related: List of colleges and universities in New Jersey)

- Caldwell University, Honors Program
- Fairleigh Dickinson University, Honors Program
- New Jersey Institute of Technology
  - Albert Dorman Honors College
- Rutgers University
- Stevens Institute of Technology
  - Pinnacle Scholars Honors Program
- The College of New Jersey Honors Program

Florham Campus, Madison and Florham Park, New Jersey
Metropolitan Campus, Teaneck and Hackensack, New Jersey
Wroxton College, Wroxton, Oxfordshire, England
Vancouver Campus, British Columbia, Canada

== New Mexico ==
(Related: List of colleges and universities in New Mexico)

- Western New Mexico University, Millennium III Honors Program
- New Mexico State University, Honors College
- San Juan College Honors Program
- The University of New Mexico Honors College

== New York ==
(Related: List of colleges and universities in New York)

=== Public institutions ===
State University of New York (SUNY)
University centers and doctoral degree granting institutions
Binghamton University
- Honors Program in Biochemistry
- Honors Program in Integrative Neuroscience
- The Pell Honors Program for PPL students (philosophy or politics or law)
- Scholars Program
Stony Brook University
- Honors College
University at Albany
- Honors College
University at Buffalo
- Honors College
College of Environmental Science and Forestry
- Honors Program
- Upper Division Honors Program

University colleges
The College at Brockport
- Honors College
Buffalo State University
- Muriel A. Howard Honors Program
Cortland
- Honors Program
Fredonia
- Honors Program
Geneseo
- Edgar Fellows Program
New Paltz
- Honors Program
Old Westbury
- Honors College
Oswego
- Honors Program
Plattsburgh
- Honors Program
Potsdam
- Honors Program

Professional institutes and colleges of technology
Fashion Institute of Technology
- Honors Program
Alfred State College
- Honors Program
Canton
- Honors Program
Cobleskill
- Honors Program
Delhi
- Honors Program

City University of New York (CUNY)
Senior and graduate colleges

Baruch College
- Macaulay Honors College
Brooklyn College
- Macaulay Honors College
City College
- Macaulay Honors College
- The Skadden, Arps Honors Program in Legal Studies
Hunter College
- Macaulay Honors College
Queens College
- Macaulay Honors College
Lehman College
- Macaulay Honors College
College of Staten Island
- Macaulay Honors College
John Jay College
- Macaulay Honors College
New York City College of Technology (City Tech) at MetroTech
- Honors Program

=== Public institutions operated by private institutions ===
New York State College of Ceramics operated by Alfred University

- Honors Program

Cornell University (New York statutory college constituents)

Cornell University College of Agriculture and Life Sciences
- CALS Research Honors Program

College of Human Ecology
- Honors Program
- Fiber Science & Apparel Design Honors Program
- Design and Environmental Analysis Honors Program
- Department of Policy Analysis and Management, Policy Analysis and Management Honors Program

=== Private institutions (not for profit) ===
Adelphi University
- Honors College
Alfred University
- Honors Program

Bard College
- Al-Quds Bard Honors College

Clarkson University
- Honors Program

Colgate University
- Benton Scholars Program
- Lampert Institute for Civic and Global Affairs

Columbia University
- Global Honors College

Cornell University

College of Arts and Sciences
- Honors Program in Biological Sciences
- Honors Program in Psychology
- Honors Program in Economics
- Department of Government Honors Program

College of Engineering
- Honors Program in Computer Science
- Biological Engineering Honors Program
- Civil Engineering Honors Program
- Engineering Physics Honors Program
- Environmental Engineering Honors Program
- Independent Major Honors Program
- Information Science, Systems, and Technology Honors Program
- Materials Science and Engineering Honors Program
- Operations Research and Engineering Honors Program
- Science of Earth Systems Honors Program

Daemen University
- Honors Program

Hartwick College
- Honors Program

Helene Fuld College of Nursing
- Honors Program

Hofstra University
- Honors College
Hobart and William Smith Colleges
- Honors Program
Ithaca College
- Honors Program

Long Island University

LIU Brooklyn
- Honors College
LIU Post (formerly C.W. Post)
- Honors Program
- Honors Green Program

Manhattanville University
- Castle Scholars Honors Program

Marist College, Honors Program

Mercy University
- Honors Program

The New School
- Riggio Honors Program

New York Institute of Technology
- Dean of Engineering Honors Program

New York University
- Presidential Honors Scholars Program
- WINS - Women in Science at NYU
- Tandon School of Engineering, Honors Program

Steinhardt School of Culture, Education, and Human Development
- Honors Program
- Dean's Global Honors Seminars

- College of Arts & Science, Honors Program

Pace University
- Pforzheimer Honors College

Rochester Institute of Technology
- Honors Program

Union College
- Scholars Program
- Seward Fellows

University of Rochester
- Department of English Honors Program
- Department of History Honors Program
- Department of Anthropology
- College of Public Health Honors Program
- Clinical and Social Sciences in Psychology Honors Program
- Department of Modern Languages and Cultures Honors Program

Utica University
- Honors Program

=== Private institutions (for profit) ===
Five Towns College
- Honors Program

=== Religious affiliated private institutions ===
Canisius University
- All-College Honors Program
Fordham University
- Honors Program
- Rose Hill Honors Program

University of Mount Saint Vincent
- Honors Program

Houghton University
- London Honors Program
- East Meets West Honors Program
- Science Honors Program

Iona University
- Honors Program

Le Moyne College
- Integral Honors Program

Niagara University
- Honors Program

St. Bonaventure University
- Honors Program

St. John Fisher University
- Honors Program

St. John's University
- Honors Program

St. Joseph's University
- Brooklyn campus, Honors Program
- Long Island campus Honors Program

Syracuse University
- Renée Crown University Honors Program

Wagner College
- Honors Program

Yeshiva University
- Stern College for Women, S. Daniel Abraham Honors Program
- Yeshiva College, Jay and Jeanie Schottenstein Honors Program
- Sy Syms School of Business, Business Honors and Entrepreneurial Leadership Program

== North Carolina ==
(Related: List of colleges and universities in North Carolina)

- Appalachian State University Honors College
- East Carolina University Honors College
- High Point University Honors Scholar Program
- North Carolina A&T University Honors College
- North Carolina State University Honors Program
- Salem College Honors Program
- University of North Carolina at Chapel Hill Honors Carolina
- University of North Carolina at Charlotte Honors College
- Western Carolina University Brinson Honors College

== North Dakota ==
(Related: List of colleges and universities in North Dakota)

- University of North Dakota, Honors Program

== Ohio ==
(Related: List of colleges and universities in Ohio)

- University of Cincinnati University Honors Program
- Bowling Green State University
- Central State University
- Ohio Northern University / Honors Program
- Ohio State University / Honors and Scholars Program
- Ohio University / Honors Tutorial College
- Miami University / Honors Program
- Mount Vernon Nazarene University Honors Program
- Cleveland State University, Jack, Joseph & Morton Mandel Honors College
- Wright State University

== Oklahoma ==
(Related: List of colleges and universities in Oklahoma)

Oklahoma State University, Honors College

Oral Roberts University, Honors Program

Rogers State University, Honors Program

University of Oklahoma,

== Oregon ==
(Related: List of colleges and universities in Oregon)

- Robert D. Clark Honors College
- Oregon State University Honors College
- George Fox University Honors Program

== Pennsylvania ==
(Related: List of colleges and universities in Pennsylvania)

=== Public institutions ===
- Indiana University of Pennsylvania, Robert E. Cook Honors College
- Pennsylvania State University, Schreyer Honors College
- University of Pittsburgh Honors College
- Temple University, Honors Program
- West Chester University, www.wcupa.edu/deputy-provost/honorsCollege/

=== Private institutions ===
- California University of Pennsylvania Honors Program
- Drexel University, Pennoni Honors College
- Point Park University www.pointpark.edu/academics/undergraduateacademics/honorsprogram/index
- Saint Francis University Honors Program
- Swarthmore College Honors Program

== Rhode Island ==
(Related: List of colleges and universities in Rhode Island)

- University of Rhode Island, Honors Program
- Rhode Island College, Honors Program
- Roger Williams University School of Law, Honors Program

== South Carolina ==
(Related: List of colleges and universities in South Carolina)

- The Citadel, The Military College of South Carolina Honors Program
- College of Charleston Honors College
- University of South Carolina Honors College
- Clemson University Honors College
- Converse University Honors Program
- Winthrop University Honors Program

== South Dakota ==
(Related: List of colleges and universities in South Dakota)

- University of South Dakota Honors Program
- Northern State University Honors Program
- Dakota State University General Beadle Honors Program

== Tennessee ==
(Related: List of colleges and universities in Tennessee)

- East Tennessee State University Honors College
- Fisk University Honors Program
- Middle Tennessee State University Honors College

== Texas (36 public & 38 private universities) ==
(Related: List of colleges and universities in Texas)

Public institutions (6 university systems; 36 stand-alone universities)

University of Houston System (4 universities)

- The Honors College at the University of Houston

University of North Texas System (2 universities)

- University of North Texas, Denton, Honors College

University of Texas System (9 universities)

- University of Texas at Arlington Honors College
- University of Texas at Austin
1. College of Liberal Arts
  1. Plan II Honors Program (founded 1935)
  2. Liberal Arts Honors Program
2. McCombs School of Business Honors Program
3. Moody College of Communication Honors Program
4. Cockrell School of Engineering Honors Program
5. College of Natural Sciences
  1. Dean's Scholars
  2. Health Science Scholars
  3. Polymathic Scholars
  4. Turing Scholars (computer science)
  5. Human Ecology Honors
- University of Texas at Dallas Collegium V Honors Program
- University of Texas at El Paso Honors Program
- University of Texas at San Antonio Honors College
- University of Texas at Tyler Honors Program

Texas A&M University System (11 universities)

- Prairie View A&M University Honors Program
- Tarleton State University Honors Programs
- Texas A&M International University D.D. Hachar Honors Program
- Texas A&M University Honors Program
- Texas A&M University-Commerce Honors College
- Texas A&M University–Corpus Christi Honors Program
- Texas A&M University at Galveston Honors Program
- Texas A&M University–Kingsville Honors College
- Texas A&M University–Texarkana Honors Program
- West Texas A&M University Honors Program

Texas Tech University System (2 universities)

- Angelo State University Honors Program
- Texas Tech University Honors College

Texas State University System (4 universities)

- Lamar University Reaud Honors College
- Sam Houston State University Elliott T. Bowers Honors College
- Sul Ross State University Honors Program
- Texas State University Honors College

Non-system affiliated (4 universities)

- Stephen F. Austin State University School of Honors
- Texas Southern University Thomas F. Freeman Honors College
- Texas Woman's University Honors Program

Private institutions (38 universities)

- Abilene Christian University Honors College
- Austin College Departmental Honors Program
- Baylor University Honors College
- Dallas Baptist University Honors Program
- Howard Payne University Honors Program
- Houston Baptist University Honors College
- Huston–Tillotson University W.E.B. DuBois Honors Program
- Rice University Scholars Program
- Southern Methodist University Honors Program
- St. Mary's University, Texas Honors Program
- Texas Christian University Honors College
- Texas Wesleyan University Honors Program
- University of the Incarnate Word Honors Program

== Utah ==
(Related: List of colleges and universities in Utah)

- Brigham Young University Honors Program
- Snow College Honors Program
- Southern Utah University Honors Program
- University of Utah Honors College
- Westminster University Honors College
- Weber State University Honors Program

== Vermont ==
(Related: List of colleges and universities in Vermont)

- University of Vermont, Patrick Leahy Honors College

== Virginia ==
(Related: List of colleges and universities in Virginia)

- Batten University, Batten Honors College
- George Mason University, Honors College
- Hampton University, Honors College
- James Madison University, Honors College
- Longwood University, Honors College
- Mary Baldwin University, Global Honors Scholars Program
- Norfolk State University, Honors College
- Old Dominion University, Honors College
- Regent University, Honors Program
- University of Mary Washington, Honors Program
- Virginia Commonwealth University, Honors Program
- Virginia Polytechnic Institute and State University, Honors College

== Washington ==
(Related: List of colleges and universities in Washington (state))

Central Washington University Honors College

- University of Washington Honors College
- Washington State University Honors College
- Western Washington University Honors Program
- Whitworth University Honors Program

== West Virginia ==
(Related: List of colleges and universities in West Virginia)

- Marshall University: Honors College
- West Virginia University Honors College

== Wisconsin ==
(Related: List of colleges and universities in Wisconsin)

- University of Wisconsin-Milwaukee Honors College
- University of Wisconsin-Stout Honors College

== Wyoming ==
(Related: List of colleges and universities in Wyoming)

- University of Wyoming Honors College

== List ==
- Honors Programs - The College Counselor for Gifted Kid
- Great Honors Programs at Public Universities
- NCHC: Link to undergraduate honors education
