= List of colleges and universities in New York's Capital District =

The colleges and universities of New York's Capital District consists of two year and four year institutions, community colleges and universities, as well as both private and public institutions.

== Colleges and universities ==
Click on the double triangles at the top of a column to sort the table by that column.

Name	Type	City or town	Date est.	Additional information	Image
SUNY Adirondack	Community college	Queensbury	1961	Part of the State University of New York System	
Albany College of Pharmacy and Health Sciences	Pharmacy school	Albany	1881	Part of Union University; Shares joint campus of University Heights	
Albany Law School	Law school	Albany	1851	Part of Union University; Shares joint campus of University Heights; Oldest independent law school in the United States	
Albany Medical College	Medical school	Albany	1839	Part of Union University; Shares joint campus of University Heights	
Bryant & Stratton College	Proprietary college	Colonie	1854		
Columbia-Greene Community College	Community college	Hudson	1966	Part of the State University of New York System	
Empire State University	Public college	Saratoga Springs, Latham, Queensbury, Schenectady, Johnstown	1971	Part of the State University of New York System; Administrative offices in Saratoga Springs, five Capital District locations	
Excelsior College	Private college	Albany	1971	Until 1998 a public college under State University of New York System; named Regents College from 1971 to 2001	
Fulton-Montgomery Community College	Community college	Johnstown	1963	Part of the State University of New York System	
Hudson Valley Community College	Community college	Troy, North Greenbush	1953	Part of the State University of New York System	
Maria College	Private college	Albany	1958	Four-year Catholic college	
Mildred Elley	Private college	Albany	1917		
Rensselaer Polytechnic Institute (RPI)	Private university	Troy	1824	Oldest technological university in the English-speaking world	
Russell Sage College	Private college	Troy, Albany	1916	Formerly The Sage Colleges	
Schenectady County Community College	Community college	Schenectady	1967	Part of the State University of New York System	
Siena University	Private college	Colonie	1937	Catholic college	
Skidmore College	Private college	Saratoga Springs	1903		
State University of New York at Cobleskill	Public university	Cobleskill	1916	Part of the State University of New York System	
SUNY Plattsburgh at Queensbury	Public University	Queensbury	2005	Part of the State University of New York System. Located on the campus of SUNY Adirondack in Queensbury, New York, SUNY Plattsburgh serves approximately 350 full and part-time students in undergraduate and graduate degree programs, as well as graduate students in a certificate of advanced studies program.	
Union College	Private university	Schenectady	1795	Part of Union University	
University at Albany, State University of New York	Public university	Albany, Guilderland	1844	Part of the State University of New York System	
