= List of colleges and universities in New York =

List of colleges and universities in New York may refer to:

- List of colleges and universities in New York (state)
- List of colleges and universities in New York City
