= List of City University of New York institutions =

The City University of New York (CUNY) system is the public university system of New York City. CUNY consists of 11 senior colleges, 7 community colleges, 1 honors college and 7 postgraduate institutions. As of 2018, CUNY is the United States' largest urban public university, with an enrollment of over 48000students.

CUNY and the State University of New York (SUNY) are different university systems, despite the fact that both are public institutions that receive funding from the state of New York. The 64 SUNY and 25 CUNY campus institutions are part of University of the State of New York (USNY). USNY is the governmental umbrella organization for most education-related institutions and many education-related personnel (both public and private) in the state of New York, and which includes, as a component, the New York State Education Department.

All of these schools are accredited by the Middle States Association of Colleges and Schools, in addition to other program-specific accreditations held by individual campuses, such as Association to Advance Collegiate Schools of Business and Association of Collegiate Business Schools and Programs.

== History ==
CUNY's history dates back to the formation of the Free Academy in 1847 by Townsend Harris. The school was fashioned as "a Free Academy for the purpose of extending the benefits of education gratuitously to persons who have been pupils in the common schools of the … city and county of New York". The Free Academy later became the City College of New York, the oldest institution among the CUNY colleges. From this grew a system of seven senior colleges, four hybrid schools, six community colleges, as well as graduate schools and professional programs. CUNY was established in 1961 as the umbrella institution encompassing the municipal colleges and a new graduate school.

Over the years, the configuration of the institutions of CUNY has changed. The current College of Staten Island, the largest CUNY school by land area, is the result of a merger between Richmond College (upper-division college founded in 1965) and Staten Island Community College (lower-division college founded in 1955). Lehman College was formerly a branch campus of Hunter College that was known as Hunter-in-the-Bronx.

The City College is the oldest institution of CUNY, having been founded in 1847. Established in 2018, the School of Labor and Urban Studies is the newest addition to the university.

== Institutions ==
Image	Name	Borough	Founded^{[a]}	Type	Enrollment (Fall 2025)	Athletics	Male/ Female %	References	Notes
	Baruch College	Manhattan	1968	Senior	20,579	CUNYAC (NCAA Division III)	48%/52%		—
	The City College	Manhattan	1847	Senior	16,663	CUNYAC (NCAA Division III)	52%/48%		—
CUNY Graduate Center	Graduate Center	Manhattan	1961	Graduate	3,202	N/A	43%/57%		—
	Graduate School of Public Health and Health Policy	Manhattan	2008	Graduate	1,002	N/A	27%/73%		—
	Guttman Community College	Manhattan	2011	Junior	1,142	N/A	45%/55%		—
Thomas Hunter Hall	Hunter College	Manhattan	1870	Senior	22,712	CUNYAC (NCAA Division III)	32%/68%		—
Haaren Hall	John Jay College of Criminal Justice	Manhattan	1964	Senior	13,988	CUNYAC (NCAA Division III)	42%/58%		Originally known as the College of Police Science.
	Macaulay Honors College	Manhattan	2001	Senior	^{[b]}	N/A	^{[b]}		—
	Borough of Manhattan Community College	Manhattan	1963	Junior	21,900	CUNYAC (NJCAA)	43%/57%		—
CUNY Graduate School of Journalism in the renovated former headquarters of the old New York Herald Tribune on West 40th Street	Newmark Graduate School of Journalism	Manhattan	2006	Graduate	223	N/A	35%/65%		—
	School of Labor and Urban Studies	Manhattan	2018	Graduate	546	N/A	37%/63%		Originally the Murphy Institute, established at Queens College in 1984 and moved to the School of Professional Studies in 2005.
	School of Medicine	Manhattan	1973	Graduate	366	N/A	33%/67%		—
	School of Professional Studies	Manhattan	2003	Graduate	4,786	N/A	30%/70%		—
	Bronx Community College	The Bronx	1957	Junior	7,345	CUNYAC (NJCAA)	44%/56%		—
Hostos Community College pedestrian walkway	Hostos Community College	The Bronx	1968	Junior	5,853	CUNYAC (NJCAA)	34%/66%		—
Lehman College music building	Lehman College	The Bronx	1968	Senior	13,615	CUNYAC (NCAA Division III)	32%/68%		Formerly the Bronx branch of Hunter College.
The east quadrangle of Brooklyn College	Brooklyn College	Brooklyn	1930	Senior	14,469	CUNYAC (NCAA Division III)	42%/58%		—
	College of Technology	Brooklyn	1946	Senior	15,252	N/A	55%/45%		—
Kingsborough Community College	Kingsborough Community College	Brooklyn	1963	Junior	19,250	CUNYAC (NJCAA)	45%/55%		—
The Academic Complex Building of Medgar Evers College	Medgar Evers College	Brooklyn	1969	Senior	3,785	CUNYAC (NCAA Division III)	29%/71%		—
The college campus	College of Staten Island	Staten Island	1976	Senior	11,332	ECC (NCAA Division II)	44%/56%		Result of a merger of Richmond College (1965) and Staten Island Community College (1955).
Building E	LaGuardia Community College	Queens	1971	Junior	15,774	CUNYAC (NJCAA)	42%/58%		—
Queens College Quad	Queens College	Queens	1937	Senior	14,914	ECC (NCAA Division II)	43%/57%		—
Queensborough Community College	Queensborough Community College	Queens	1958	Junior	10,619	CUNYAC (NJCAA)	47%/53%		Transferred to CUNY from the SUNY system in 1965.
	School of Law	Queens	1983	Graduate	696	N/A	39%/61%		—
Academic Core Building	York College	Queens	1966	Senior	6,490	CUNYAC (NCAA Division III)	33%/67%		—

== Notes ==
- ^{a} Each college's founding year is linked to the category of all schools founded in that year
- ^{b} Enrollment and Gender ratio data not provided for these units.
