= New York College =

New York College or College of New York may mean:

- City College of New York
- Metropolitan College of New York
- New York Central College
- New York Chiropractic College, now Northeast College of Health Sciences
- New York City College of Technology
- New York College of Health Professions
- New York College of Podiatric Medicine
- New York Institute of Technology College of Osteopathic Medicine
- New York Medical College
- New York State College of Ceramics at Alfred University

== See also ==
- College of the City of New York (disambiguation)
- State University of New York
- University of New York (disambiguation)
