= Education in New York =

Education in New York may refer to:

- Education in New York City
- Education in New York (state)
