= Education in New York (state) =

In the U.S. state of New York, public education is overseen by the University of the State of New York (USNY) (distinct from the State University of New York, known as SUNY), its policy-setting Board of Regents, and its administrative arm, the New York State Education Department; this includes all public primary, middle-level, and secondary education in the state. The New York City Department of Education, which manages the public school system in New York City, is the largest school district in the United States, with more students than the combined population of eight U.S. states. Over 1 million students are taught in more than 1,200 separate public and private schools throughout the state.

== Primary and secondary schools ==
Public secondary education consists of high schools that teach elective courses in trades, languages, and liberal arts with tracks for gifted, college-bound and industrial arts students. New York is one of seven states that mandate the teaching of Holocaust and genocide studies at some point in elementary or secondary school curricula.

One of the major public policy issues in recent decades has been the attempt by poorer communities to get more state funding to compensate for what they cannot generate in property taxes. The reliance of most communities on local property taxes to support schools has created the paradoxical situation of residents in wealthier communities paying a lower tax rate than residents in communities of lower average income.

While state law has required integrated schools since 1900 (overturning an 1894 law that permitted communities to establish separate schools for children of African-American descent), patterns of residential segregation in many areas has often led to de facto segregated schools. As studies have shown the importance of integrating children from different economic classes, more than ethnic groups, communities are devising different methods, such as magnet schools, to deal with attracting diverse groups of students.

=== Charter schools ===
As of 2024, there were 343 charter schools serving 170,000 students in the state.

=== History ===
Before 1847, the state apparently had county-level school superintendents, but these were abolished across the state in that year.

Carol O'Connor notes that between 1896 and 1935, the state legislature made eight amendments to the compulsory education law. The solons were responding to pressure from labor unions and advocates of child welfare. The goal was to keep children in school for a longer period of time, which would in turn keep them off the labor market. Labor permits for children under 16 steadily became harder to obtain.

Between 2000 and 2009, school enrollment declined by 121,000 students, and the number of teachers increased by 15,000. The student:teacher ratio was the eighth lowest in the country, 13:1. At $16,000, its per student spending was the nation's highest.

== Colleges and universities ==
=== The SUNY System ===
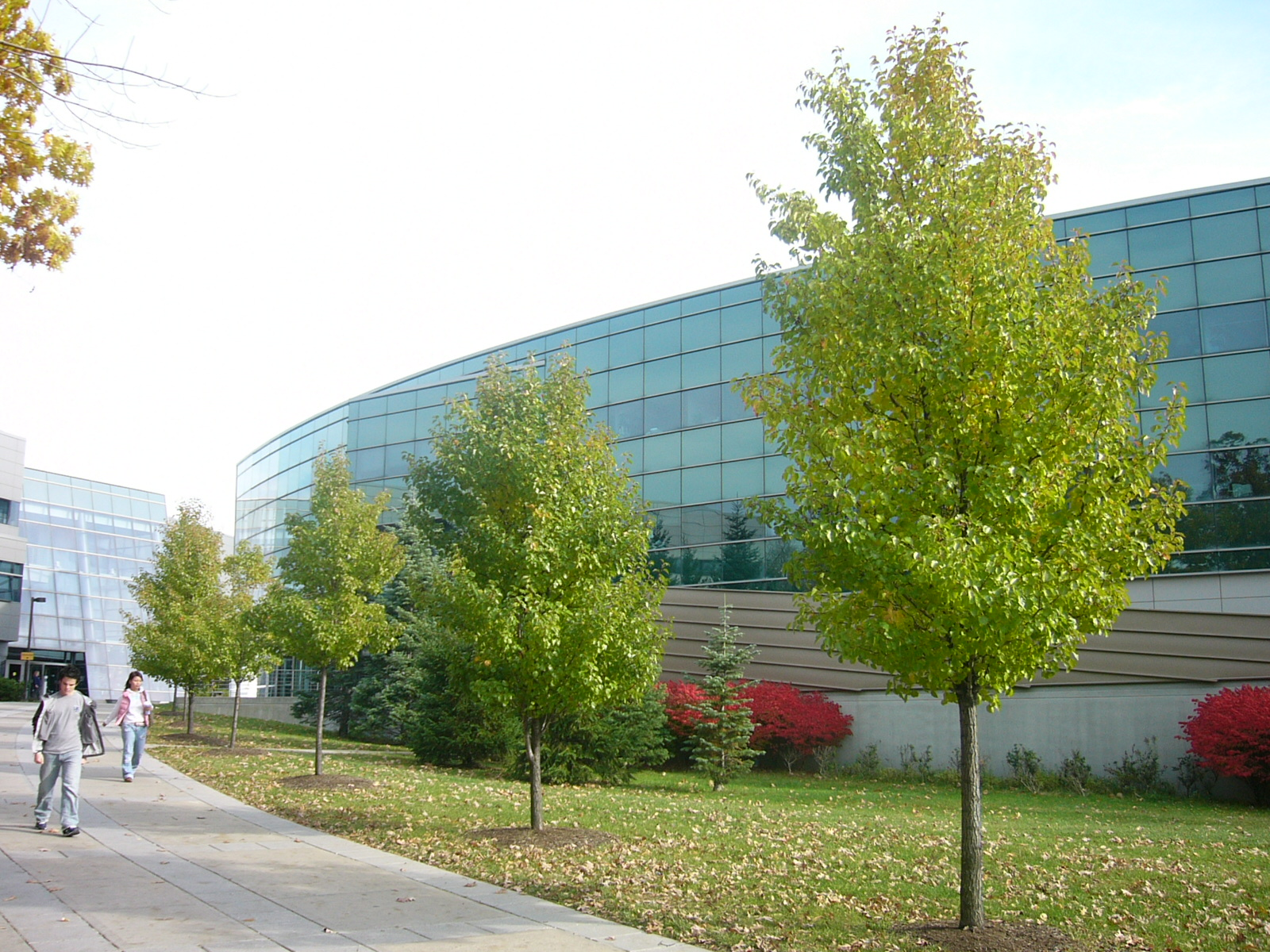
Academic Complex at Binghamton University

New York's statewide public university system is the State University of New York (SUNY). Its top-ranked schools are SUNY at Albany, Binghamton University, University at Buffalo, and Stony Brook University.

With a total enrollment of 459,550 students and 1.1 million continuing education students spanning 64 campuses across the state, SUNY is the largest comprehensive public university system in the United States. New York's largest public university is the State University of New York at Buffalo, which was founded by Millard Fillmore. The campuses are a mix of community colleges, technical colleges, undergraduate colleges, and doctoral-granting institutions, with the latter including the four university centers (University at Albany, Binghamton University, University at Buffalo, and Stony Brook University).

The SUNY system includes the following campuses, broken down into the categories of University Centers, other doctoral-granting institutions including five statutory institutions, Comprehensive Colleges, Technology Colleges, and Community Colleges.

==== Doctoral-Granting Institutions ====
University Centers

- University at Albany
- Binghamton University
- University at Buffalo (SUNY Buffalo)
- Stony Brook University

Other doctoral-granting institutions and statutory colleges

- State University of New York College of Environmental Science and Forestry (next to the private Syracuse University campus, with which it has a close working relationship, but which it is legally and technically not a part of)
- State University of New York College of Optometry
- State University of New York Upstate Medical University
- SUNY Downstate Medical Center
- SUNY Polytechnic Institute

One statutory college at Alfred University:

- New York State College of Ceramics (which is legally and technically part of Alfred University)

Four statutory colleges at Cornell University (which are legally and technically part of Cornell):

- New York State College of Agriculture and Life Sciences (CALS)
  - includes the New York State Agricultural Experiment Station at Geneva, New York
- New York State College of Human Ecology (HumEc)
- New York State College of Veterinary Medicine
- New York State School of Industrial and Labor Relations (ILR)

==== Comprehensive Colleges ====
- Buffalo State University
- Empire State University (statewide)
- State University of New York at Cortland
- State University of New York at Fredonia
- State University of New York at Geneseo
- State University of New York at New Paltz
- State University of New York at Old Westbury
- State University of New York at Oneonta
- State University of New York at Oswego
- State University of New York at Plattsburgh
- State University of New York at Potsdam
- State University of New York at Purchase
- SUNY Brockport

==== Technology Colleges ====
- Alfred State College
- Farmingdale State College
- Fashion Institute of Technology
- State University of New York at Canton
- State University of New York at Cobleskill
- State University of New York at Delhi
- State University of New York at Morrisville
- State University of New York Maritime College

==== Community Colleges ====
- SUNY Adirondack Community College
- Broome Community College
- Cayuga Community College
- Clinton Community College
- Columbia-Greene Community College
- Corning Community College
- Dutchess Community College
- Erie Community College
- Finger Lakes Community College
- Fulton-Montgomery Community College
- Genesee Community College
- Herkimer County Community College
- Hudson Valley Community College
- Jamestown Community College
- Jefferson Community College
- Mohawk Valley Community College
- Monroe Community College
- Nassau Community College
- SUNY Niagara
- North Country Community College
- Onondaga Community College
- Orange County Community College (SUNY Orange)
- Rockland Community College
- Schenectady County Community College
- Suffolk County Community College
- Sullivan County Community College
- Tompkins Cortland Community College
- Ulster County Community College
- Westchester Community College

=== The CUNY System ===
The City University of New York (CUNY) is the public university system of New York City and is independent of the SUNY system. It is the largest urban university in the United States, with 11 senior colleges, an honors college, 7 community colleges, a doctorate-granting graduate school, a journalism school, a law school, the CUNY School of Medicine, a professional studies school, and a public health school. More than 274,000 degree-credit, adult, continuing and professional education students are enrolled at campuses located in all five New York City boroughs.

CUNY consists of the following 24 colleges, including the senior colleges, community colleges, graduate and professional institutions.

==== Senior Colleges ====
- Baruch College
- Brooklyn College
- City College of New York
- College of Staten Island
- Hunter College
- John Jay College of Criminal Justice
- Lehman College
- Medgar Evers College
- New York City College of Technology
- Queens College, City University of New York
- York College, City University of New York

==== Community Colleges ====
- Borough of Manhattan Community College
- Bronx Community College
- Guttman Community College
- Hostos Community College
- Kingsborough Community College
- LaGuardia Community College
- Queensborough Community College

==== Graduate and professional schools ====
- Craig Newmark Graduate School of Journalism at the City University of New York
- CUNY Graduate Center
- CUNY Graduate School of Public Health and Health Policy
- CUNY School of Law
- CUNY School of Medicine
- CUNY School of Professional Studies
- William E. Macaulay Honors College

=== Private universities ===
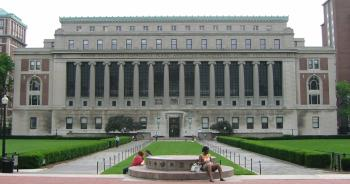
Butler Library at Columbia University in the City of New York, which has the largest endowment of any higher education institution in New York.

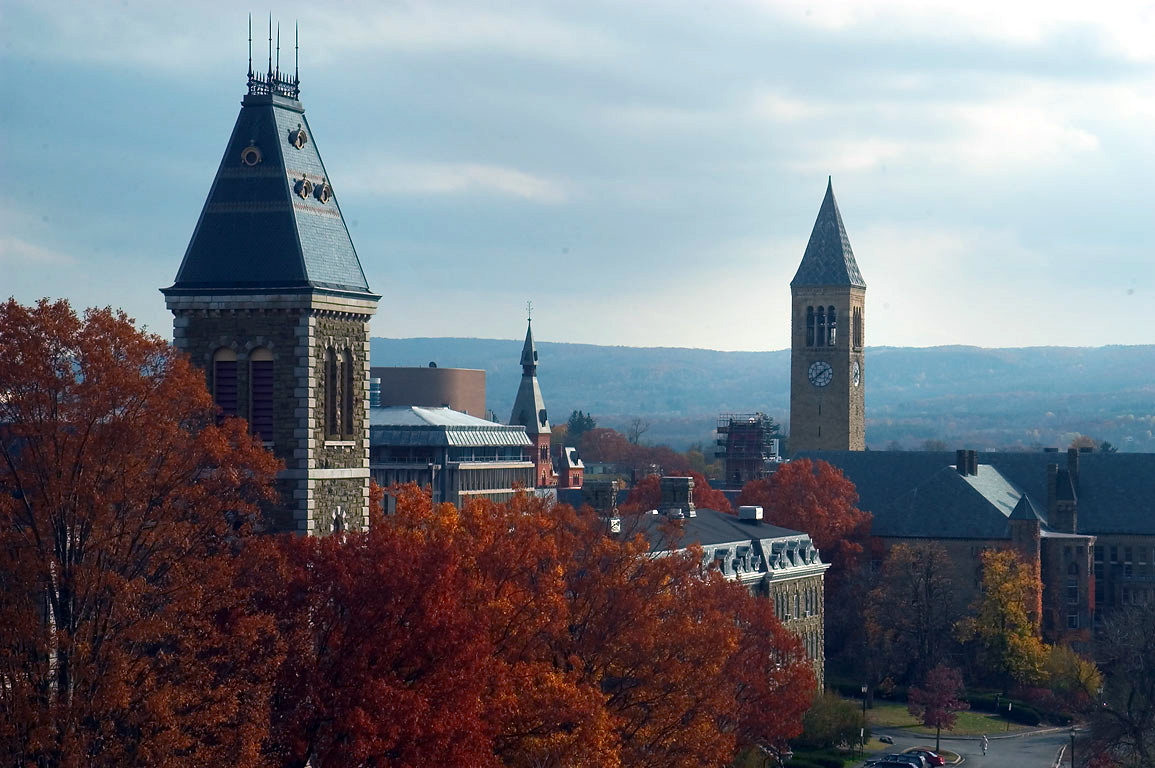
Old Stone Row on the Arts Quadrangle, Cornell University.

New York has hundreds of private colleges and universities, including many religious and special-purpose institutions. The state's land-grant university is Cornell University; though primarily a private institution, it has public sectors. Columbia University, Cornell University, New York University, and the University of Rochester are widely regarded as the premier higher education institutions in New York, all of them leading, world-renowned universities and members of the Association of American Universities, the pre-eminent group of research universities in the United States.

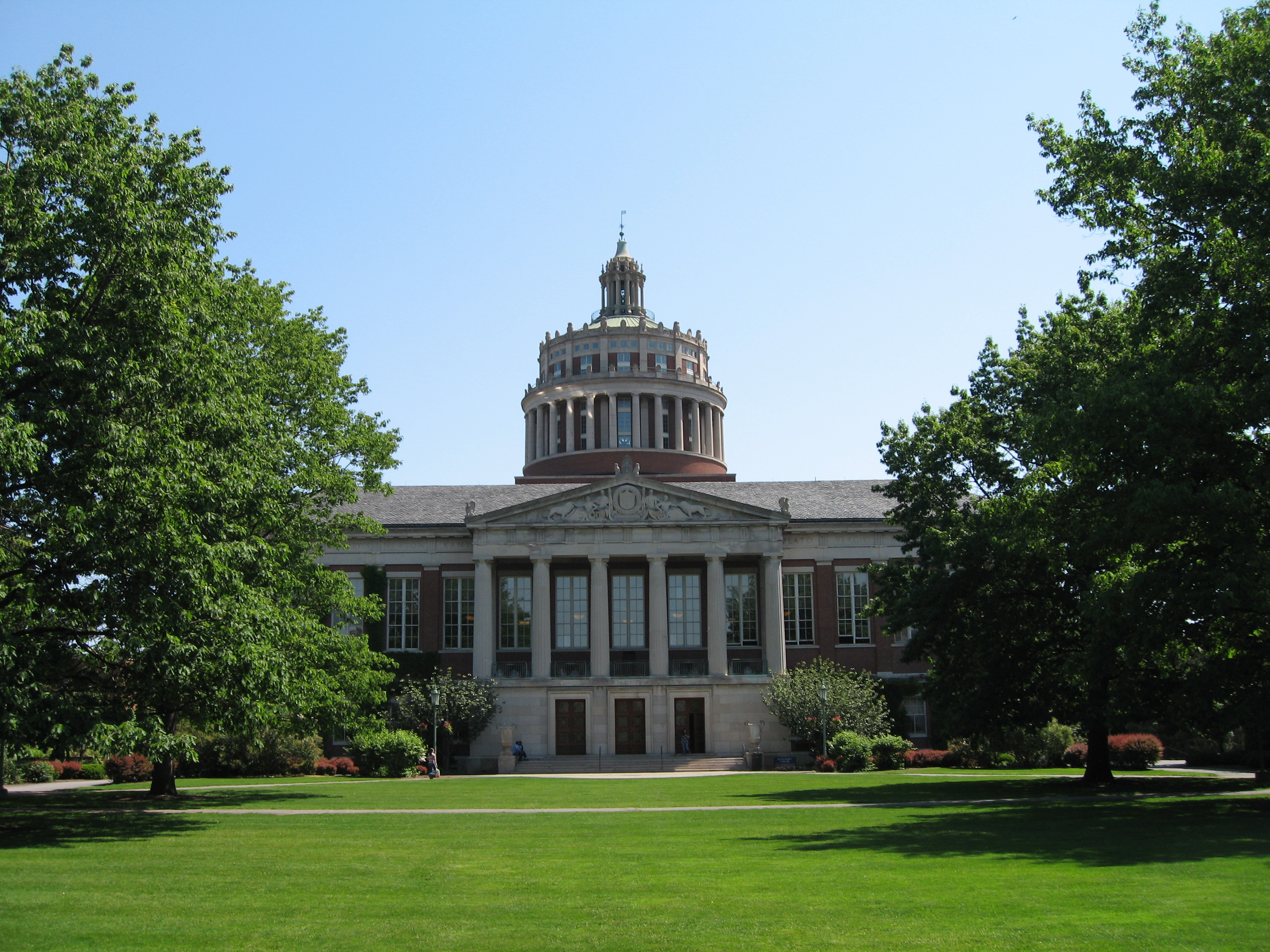
Rush Rhees Library at the University of Rochester, which in the early 1970s had the third largest endowment in the country, after Harvard University and the University of Texas System, and is the 6th largest employer in New York State today.

Two of the nation's five Federal Service Academies are located in New York: the United States Military Academy at West Point and the United States Merchant Marine Academy at Kings Point.

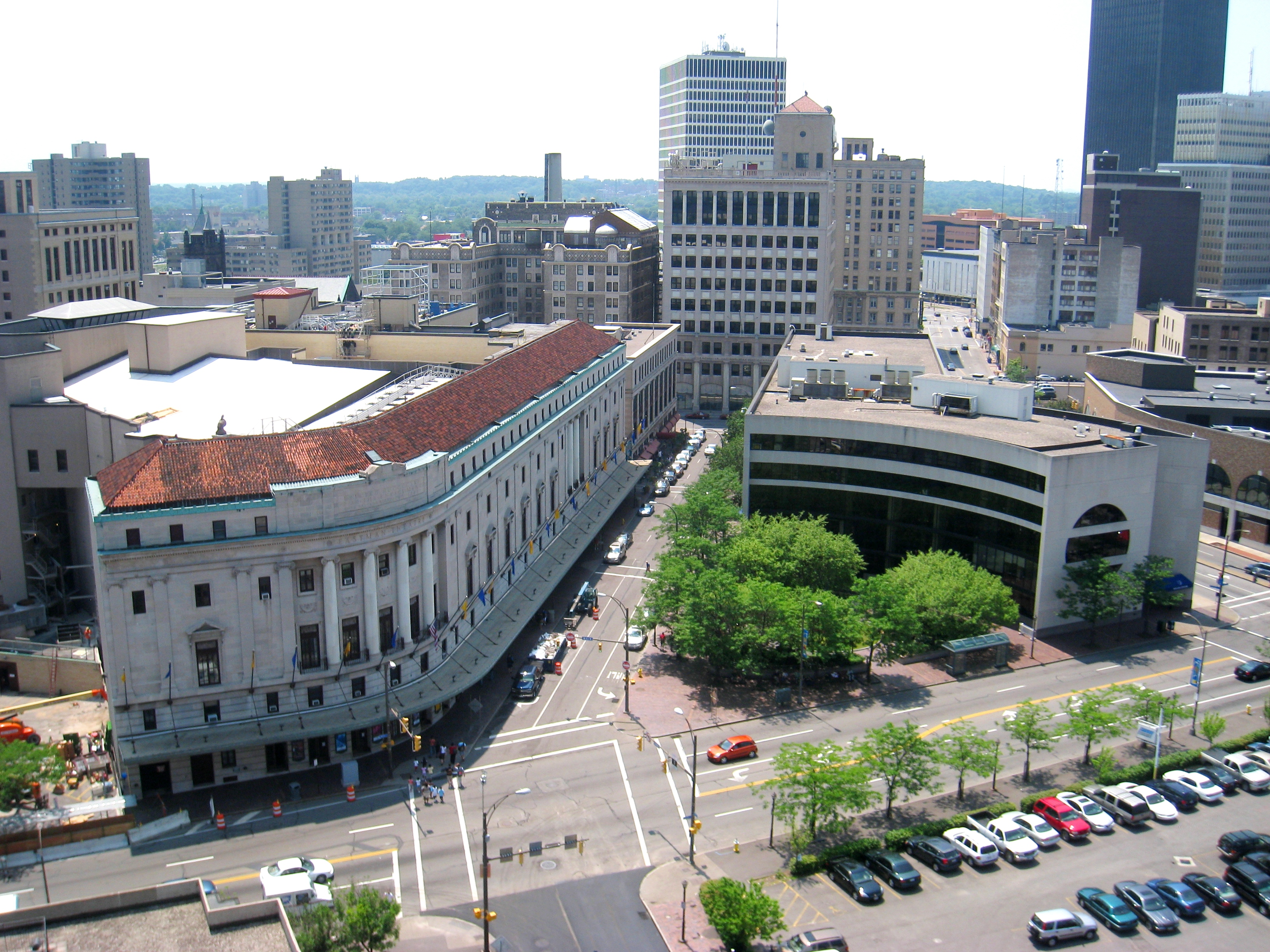
The Eastman School of Music at the University of Rochester, which consistently ranks as the best music school in the nation.

New York attracts the most college students from other states, according to statistics that show that among freshmen who leave their home states to attend college, more come to New York than any other state, including California.

In total, New York State has 307 degree-granting institutions, second in number only to California. Among them are:

- Bard College
- Clarkson University
- Canisius University
- Colgate University
- Columbia University
- Cooper Union
- Cornell University
- The Culinary Institute of America
- Daemen University
- Dominican University New York
- D'Youville University
- Elmira College
- Fordham University
- Hamilton College
- Hartwick College
- Helene Fuld College of Nursing
- Hobart and William Smith Colleges
- Hofstra University
- Iona University
- Ithaca College
- Manhattan University
- Marist University
- New York Institute of Technology
- New York University
- Pace University
- Pratt Institute
- Rensselaer Polytechnic Institute
- Rochester Institute of Technology
- Sarah Lawrence College
- Skidmore College
- St. Bonaventure University
- St. John Fisher University
- St. John's University
- St. Lawrence University
- Syracuse University
- Union College
- University of Rochester
- Utica University
- Vassar College

== See also ==
- Government of New York
- Education in New York City
- List of colleges and universities in New York
