= List of colleges and universities on Long Island =

This is a list of colleges and universities entirely in, or with a campus in, Nassau or Suffolk County. For institutions in the Long Island sections of Brooklyn and Queens, two of New York City's five boroughs, see the separate List of colleges and universities in New York City.

== Public ==
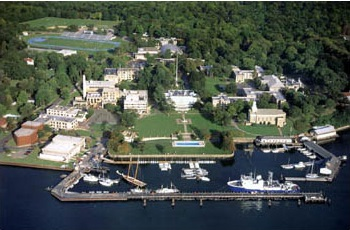
United States Merchant Marine Academy

=== Federal Service Academies ===
- United States Merchant Marine Academy - Kings Point

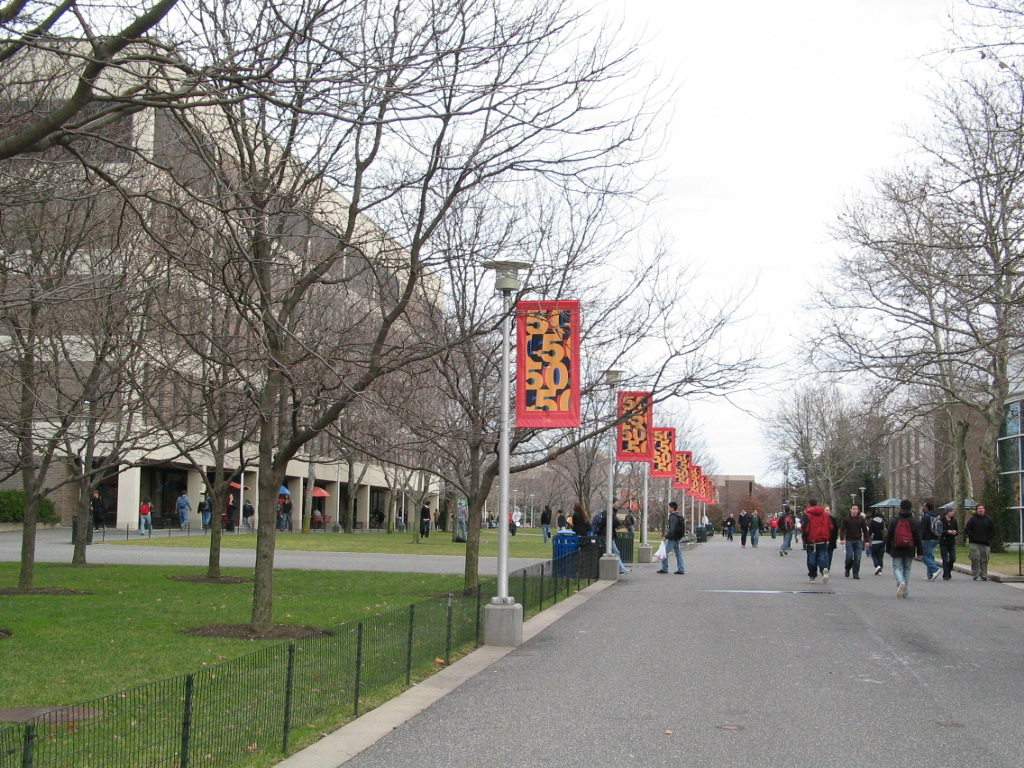
Stony Brook University

=== State University of New York ===
- Stony Brook University - Stony Brook
  - Stony Brook Southampton - Southampton
- SUNY Old Westbury - Old Westbury
- Farmingdale State College - East Farmingdale
- Nassau Community College - East Garden City (within Uniondale)
- Suffolk County Community College - Campuses in Selden, Riverhead, and Brentwood
  - Sayville Downtown Center - Sayville
  - Culinary Arts and Hospitality Center - Riverhead

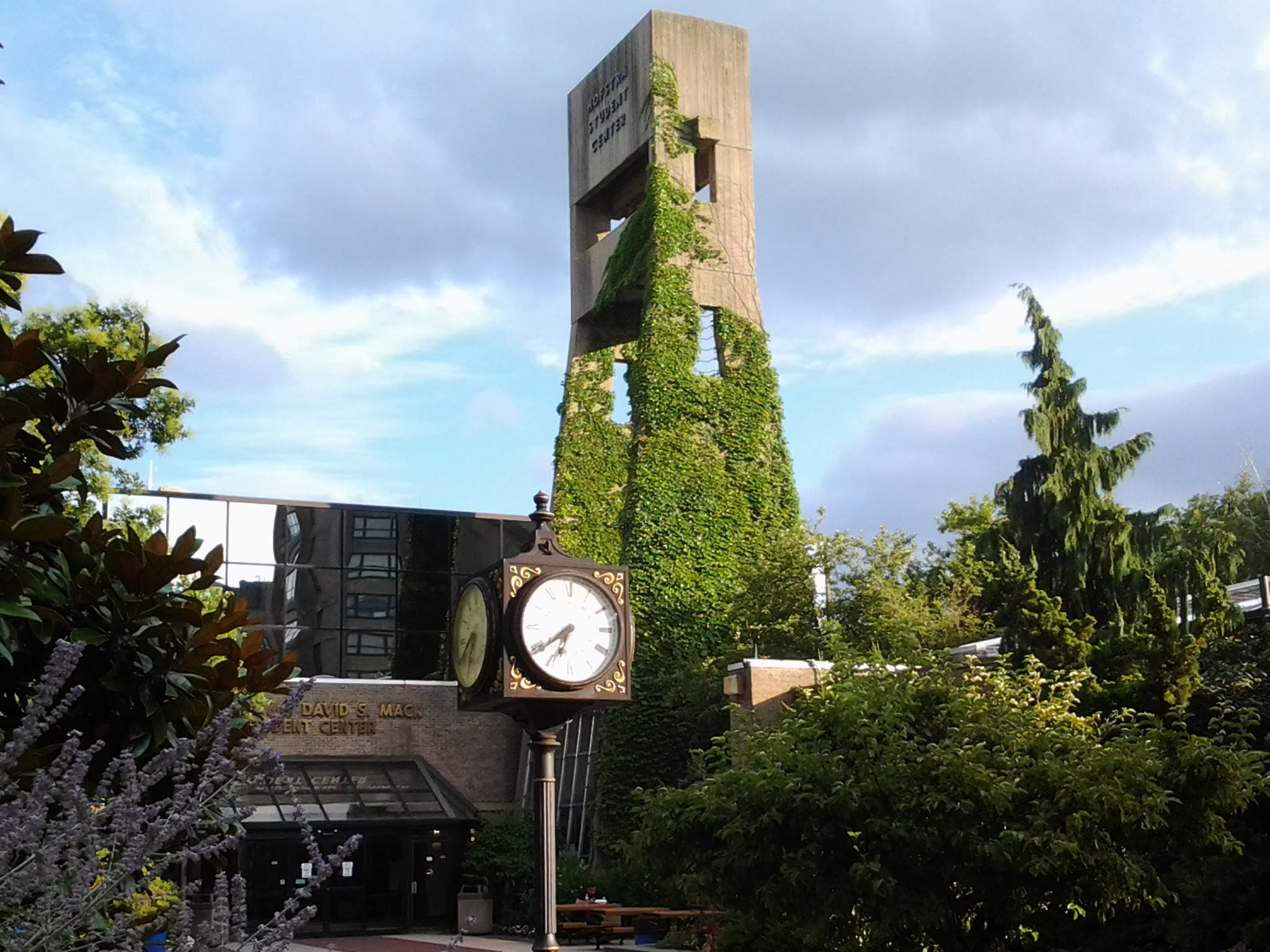
Hofstra University Student Center

== Private ==
- Adelphi University - Garden City
  - Adelphi Hauppauge Education and Conference Center in Hauppauge
- Five Towns College - Dix Hills
- Hofstra University - Hempstead
  - Maurice A. Deane School of Law
  - Zucker School of Medicine
- Long Island University
  - LIU Post - Brookville
  - LIU Brentwood - regional campus in Brentwood
  - LIU Riverhead - regional campus in Riverhead
- Molloy University - Rockville Centre
  - Molloy University Suffolk Center in East Farmingdale
- New York Institute of Technology - Old Westbury
  - New York Institute of Technology College of Osteopathic Medicine
- New York University Grossman Long Island School of Medicine - Mineola
- St. Joseph's University - Patchogue
- Touro College and University System
  - Touro College Graduate School of Education - Bay Shore
  - Touro College School of Health Sciences - Bay Shore
  - Touro Law Center - Central Islip
- Cold Spring Harbor Laboratory School of Biological Sciences - Cold Spring Harbor
- Webb Institute - Glen Cove

== Satellite and branch campuses ==
- St. John's University - Hauppauge
