= Dorothy E. Hayes =

American graphic designer, educator (1935–2015)

- Born: Dorothy Earline Lorraine Hayes; December 1, 1935; Mobile, Alabama, United States
- Died: July 31, 2015 (aged 79); Mobile, Alabama, United States
- Education: Alabama State College, Cooper Union
- Occupations: Graphic designer, educator, abstract sculptor, curator
- Known for: Early Black graphic designer, and founder of one of the first design studios opened by an African American woman

Dorothy Earline Lorraine Hayes (December 1, 1935 – July 31, 2015) was an American graphic designer, sculptor, and educator. She was an early Black graphic designer and the owner of the commercial design studio, "Dorothy's Door" in New York City. She taught at New York City Technical College (now New York City College of Technology) in Brooklyn.

== Early life and education ==
Dorothy E. Hayes was born on December 1, 1935, in Mobile, Alabama. She attended high school in Pensacola, Florida.

Hayes graduated with a B.S. degree in secondary education from Alabama State College (now Alabama State University) in Montgomery; and at Cooper Union School of Art (now Cooper Union) in New York City.

== Career ==
Hayes moved from Alabama to New York City in 1957, during a time when there were fewer Black designers and artists. In her early career she worked in various design roles, starting at Robert N. McLeod Inc., and followed by Crowell-Collier Publishing Company, Murray Leff and Company, and Wallack and Harris Inc.. Hayes was the owner of a commercial design studio, "Dorothy's Door" in New York City, which opened in 1969, one of the first design studios opened by an African American woman. She was also a sculptor and made abstract sculptures of plastic.

In 1969, Hayes interviewed five Black designers and wrote an article, "The Black Experience in Graphic Design" in the November/December 1968 issue of Communication Arts journal. During this era, the challenges of Black designers were less discussed and there was a hope of building awareness.

Hayes co-curated the Black Artist in Graphic Communication exhibition which toured the United States and Canada from April 1970 until April 1971, and was shown at the Pensacola Art Center in Pensacola, Florida (under Hendrik Langerak, museum director). The Black Artist in Graphic Communication exhibition included works by Romare Bearden, Leo and Diane Dillon, John Steptoe, Sam Reed, Josephine Jones, George Ford Jr., and Don Miller.

Hayes was a design professor at New York City Technical College (now New York City College of Technology) in Brooklyn.

She died on July 31, 2015, in Mobile, Alabama. Her archives at the Stanford Libraries.
