= Carmen Renée Green =

American pain management physician

Carmen Renée Green, M.D.

Personal details
- Education: University of Michigan-Flint (BA), Michigan State University College of Human Medicine (MD)
- Occupation: Physician

Carmen Renée Green is an American anesthesiologist, pain medicine physician, and academic administrator. She is the second dean of the CUNY School of Medicine.

== Life ==
Green earned a B.S. in biology from the University of Michigan–Flint in 1983. She completed a M.D. at the Michigan State University College of Human Medicine in 1987. In 1989, she completed an internship in internal medicine at its Saginaw Campus. She completed a residency in internal medicine and anesthesiology at Michigan Medicine in 1992 followed by a fellowship in pain management.

Green was a tenured professor at Michigan Medicine. She taught anesthesiology, obstetrics and gynecology, health management and policy, and pain management. She was the first associate vice president and associate dean for health equity and inclusion. She is a fellow of the Gerontological Society of America. In 2021, Green became the second dean of the CUNY School of Medicine.
