= College of the City of New York =

College of the City of New York may refer to:

- City University of New York (CUNY), the public university system of New York City
  - College of the City of New York, an old name (1866–1929) for City College of New York (CCNY), now part of CUNY
  - New York City College of Technology, CUNY's technology college, founded in 1946
- University of the City of New York, old name for New York University, a private research university founded in 1831

== See also ==
- University of New York (disambiguation)
