= Zev Brenner =

American radio host

Zev J. Brenner is an Orthodox Jewish radio host and president and founder of Talkline Communications, a Radio/TV network founded in 1981.

== Personal life ==
Brenner graduated from the New York City Technical College of the City University in NY. He married Adena Karen Berkowitz, a lawyer and daughter of William Berkowitz, the national president of the American Jewish Heritage Committee in New York in 1988. He is an ordained Rabbi.

== Talk-show ==
The Talkline talk-show is a regularly scheduled talk-show airing in Metro New York City and has interviewed notable personalities including President Bill Clinton; Secretary of State Hillary Clinton; Senators Joseph Lieberman and Charles Schumer; Israeli Prime Ministers Benjamin Netanyahu, Shimon Peres, Yitzhak Shamir and Yitzhak Rabin; former Vice President Dan Quayle; former Soviet General Secretary Mikhail Gorbachev; Mayor David Dinkins and Al Sharpton.

Brenner is known as one of the only Orthodox Jews in the United States who serves as a talk-show host. He is also known for addressing many important but controversial topics in the Jewish community.

In 2010, the FBI and U.S. Attorney's Office used the show as part of an elaborate sting operation that helped the government convict Malcolm Smith and other New York politicians in a corruption scandal.

== See also ==
- Nachum Segal
