= Morehead Honors College =

Division of the University of Georgia

Coordinates: 33.9565°N 83.3758°W

Jere W. Morehead Honors College
- Type: Honors college
- Established: 1960
- Parent institution: University of Georgia
- Dean: Meg Amstutz
- Location: Athens, Georgia, United States
- Website: https://honors.uga.edu

The Jere W. Morehead Honors College is an honors college within the University of Georgia (UGA), located in Athens, Georgia. Meg Amstutz serves as dean. College Transitions, a college admissions publisher, has ranked the college No. 1 among honors programs and colleges in the United States.

== History ==
An honors program at the University of Georgia was established in March 1960 following a proposal by the Franklin College of Arts and Sciences, with 43 students enrolling in the first courses that fall. In 1973, the UGA Foundation trustees created the Foundation Fellowship, the university's top academic scholarship; a $31 million gift from alumnus Bernard B. Ramsey in 1996 elevated the fellowship to among America's best.

The program was renamed the Jere W. Morehead Honors College on May 11, 2021, following approval by the University System of Georgia Board of Regents, and was the culmination of a nearly $12 million fundraising campaign led by the UGA Foundation and its emeriti trustees. The college is named in honor of Jere W. Morehead, the 22nd president of the University of Georgia, who served as director of the Honors Program from 1999 to 2004.

== Academics ==
The Morehead Honors College enrolls approximately 2,800 students, representing 9% of UGA undergraduates, who may pursue any degree program at the university. The college houses the Major Scholarships Office and the Center for Undergraduate Research Opportunities, both of which are open to all UGA undergraduates.

College Transitions ranked the Morehead Honors College No. 1 among honors programs and colleges in the United States in 2024 and again in 2026.
