= List of colleges and universities in New York City =

The following is a list of public and private institutions of higher education in New York City, New York, United States.

== Public ==
=== State University of New York (SUNY) ===
- Fashion Institute of Technology
- SUNY College of Optometry
- SUNY Downstate Medical Center, Brooklyn
- Empire State University, The Harry Van Arsdale Jr. Center for Labor Studies
- SUNY Maritime College, Throggs Neck, Bronx

=== City University of New York (CUNY) ===
==== Community colleges ====
- Borough of Manhattan Community College
- Bronx Community College
- Guttman Community College, Midtown Manhattan
- Hostos Community College, Bronx
- Kingsborough Community College, Brighton Beach, Brooklyn
- LaGuardia Community College, Long Island City, Queens
- Queensborough Community College, Bayside, Queens

==== Undergraduate colleges ====
- Baruch College, Manhattan
- Brooklyn College, Midwood
- City College of New York, Hamilton Heights, Manhattan
- College of Staten Island
- Hunter College, Upper East Side
- John Jay College of Criminal Justice, Hell's Kitchen, Manhattan
- Lehman College, Bronx
- Medgar Evers College, Crown Heights, Brooklyn
- New York City College of Technology, Downtown Brooklyn
- Queens College, Flushing
- York College, Jamaica, Queens

==== Undergraduate honors college ====
- CUNY William E. Macaulay Honors College, Upper West Side

==== Graduate schools ====
- CUNY Graduate Center, B. Altman and Company Building, Midtown, Manhattan
- CUNY Graduate School of Journalism
- CUNY School of Law, Long Island City
- CUNY School of Medicine, Hamilton Heights, Manhattan
- CUNY School of Professional Studies
- CUNY School of Public Health, East Harlem

== Private ==
=== Allied health sciences and biology ===
- Albert Einstein College of Medicine, Morris Park, Bronx
- Boston Graduate School of Psychoanalysis–New York
- Louis V. Gerstner Sloan Kettering Graduate School of Biomedical Science
- Helene Fuld College of Nursing, East Harlem
- Icahn School of Medicine at Mount Sinai
- Mandl School: The College of Allied Health, Midtown Manhattan
- Mount Sinai Phillips School of Nursing, East Harlem
- Pacific College of Health and Science
- Richard Gilder Graduate School at the American Museum of Natural History
- Rockefeller University, Upper East Side
- Swedish Institute College of Health Sciences

=== Architecture, design and engineering ===
- Bard Graduate Center, Upper West Side
- Cooper Union, Cooper Square
- Laboratory Institute of Merchandising
- Pratt Institute, Clinton Hill, Brooklyn
- New York Institute of Technology
- New York School of Interior Design
- Vanderbilt University, Master of Science in Business and Technology, Chelsea
- Vaughn College of Aeronautics & Technology, East Elmhurst, Queens

=== Comprehensive colleges and universities ===
- Berkeley College, Midtown Manhattan
- Boricua College, Washington Heights and Williamsburg
- Columbia University, Morningside Heights
  - Barnard College
  - Columbia Business School, Manhattanville
  - Columbia Climate School
  - Columbia College
  - Columbia Graduate School of Architecture, Planning and Preservation
  - Columbia Graduate School of Arts and Sciences
  - Columbia Law School
  - Columbia University College of Dental Medicine
  - Columbia University College of Physicians and Surgeons, Washington Heights
  - Columbia University Graduate School of Journalism
  - Columbia University Mailman School of Public Health
  - Columbia University School of the Arts
  - Columbia University School of General Studies
  - Columbia University School of Nursing
  - Columbia University School of Professional Studies
  - Columbia University School of Social Work
  - Fu Foundation School of Engineering and Applied Science
  - Teachers College, Columbia University
  - School of International and Public Affairs
- Cornell University - main campus in Ithaca, New York, but three additional schools in New York City
  - Cornell Tech, Roosevelt Island, Manhattan
  - Weill Cornell Graduate School of Medical Sciences
  - Weill Cornell Medical College
- Fordham University
  - Lincoln Center campus, Manhattan
    - Fordham University School of Law
    - Gabelli School of Business
  - Rose Hill campus, The Bronx
- IE University New York, SoHo
- Long Island University, Brooklyn
- Manhattan University, Riverdale, Bronx
- Mercy University - main campus in Westchester County, but branch campus located at Herald Square
- Metropolitan College of New York, Bronx
- Monroe University, Bronx
- New York Institute of Technology
  - New York Institute of Technology School of Architecture and Design
  - New York Institute of Technology College of Art and Sciences
  - New York Institute of Technology College of Engineering and Computing Sciences
  - New York Institute of Technology School of Health Professions
  - New York Institute of Technology School of Management
- The New School
  - School for Social Research
  - Eugene Lang College, School for Liberal Arts
  - College of Performing Arts
    - Mannes School of Music
    - School of Jazz
    - School of Drama
  - Parsons School of Design
- New York University
  - College of Arts & Science
  - Graduate School of Arts and Science
  - Liberal Studies
  - College of Dentistry
  - Courant Institute of Mathematical Sciences
  - Gallatin School of Individualized Study
  - Grossman School of Medicine
  - Institute of Fine Arts
  - Stern School of Business
  - Wagner Graduate School of Public Service
  - Rory Meyers College of Nursing
  - School of Professional Studies
  - School of Law
  - Silver School of Social Work
  - Steinhardt School of Culture, Education, and Human Development
  - Tandon School of Engineering
  - Tisch School of the Arts
- Northeastern University – New York City, located at the former campus of Marymount Manhattan College
- Pace University, Financial District
- Plaza College, Forest Hills, Queens
- St. Francis College, Downtown Brooklyn
- St. John's University, Queens
  - St. John's University School of Law
- St. Joseph's University, Brooklyn
- Touro University
  - College of Osteopathic Medicine, Harlem
  - Lander College for Men, Kew Gardens Hills, Queens
  - Lander College for Women – The Anna Ruth and Mark Hasten School, Upper East Side
- University of Mount Saint Vincent, Riverdale, Bronx
- Wagner College, Staten Island
- Yeshiva University
  - Stern College for Women, Murray Hill, Manhattan
  - Yeshiva College, Washington Heights, Manhattan
  - Sy Syms School of Business, Washington Heights, Manhattan
  - Rabbi Isaac Elchanan Theological Seminary, Washington Heights, Manhattan
  - Benjamin N. Cardozo School of Law, Union Square

=== Education ===
- Bank Street College of Education, Morningside Heights
- Relay Graduate School of Education, Financial District

=== Fine and performing arts ===
- American Academy of Dramatic Arts
- American Musical and Dramatic Academy, Lincoln Square, Manhattan
- Juilliard School, Lincoln Center for the Performing Arts
- Laboratory Institute of Merchandising, Midtown, Manhattan
- Manhattan School of Music, Morningside Heights
- New York Academy of Art, Tribeca
- New York Conservatory for Dramatic Arts, Flatiron District
- New York Film Academy, Financial District
- Pratt Institute, Clinton Hill, Brooklyn
- School of Visual Arts, Chelsea
- Sotheby's Institute of Art, General Electric Building

=== Law schools ===
- Brooklyn Law School, Downtown Brooklyn
- New York Law School, Tribeca

=== Mortuary science ===
- American Academy McAllister Institute, Midtown Manhattan

=== Theological colleges and seminaries ===
- Beth Hatalmud Rabbinical College, Bensonhurst
- General Theological Seminary, Chelsea
- Hebrew Union College-Jewish Institute of Religion, Greenwich Village
- HJ International Graduate School for Peace and Public Leadership
- Jewish Theological Seminary of America, Morningside Heights
- Mesivtha Tifereth Jerusalem of America, Lower East Side
- Mesivta Torah Vodaath Seminary, Flatbush
- Mirrer Yeshiva Central Institute, Brooklyn
- Rabbinical Academy Mesivta Rabbi Chaim Berlin, Brooklyn
- Rabbinical Seminary of America, Flushing
- Talmudical Seminary Oholei Torah, Brooklyn
- Tomchei Tmimim Yeshivah, Brooklyn
- United Talmudical Seminary, Brooklyn and Queens
- Union Theological Seminary, Morningside Heights
- Yeshiva of Far Rockaway Derech Ayson, Far Rockaway
- Yeshiva of Nitra, Brooklyn
- Yeshiva of the Telshe, Riverdale
- Yeshiva Shaar HaTorah, Kew Gardens
- Yeshivas Chofetz Chaim, Flushing

== Permanently closed institutions ==
See defunct colleges and universities in New York state for institutions that once existed but have since closed.
