= Louisiana Scholars' College =

Public honors college in Natchitoches, Louisiana, US

- Motto: ἀρετή (Greek)
- Motto in English: "Virtue"
- Type: Public, Co-ed
- Established: 1987
- Director: Dr. Keith Dromm
- Faculty: 10
- Location: Natchitoches, Louisiana, United States
- Colors: Green and White
- Website: scholars.nsula.edu

The Louisiana Scholars' College at Northwestern State University, or "Scholars' College" as it is known by its students and faculty, is Louisiana's only designated four-year, selective-admissions honors college in the liberal arts and sciences.

== History ==
The Scholars' College was established in 1987 by the Louisiana Board of Regents and then-Governor Edwin Edwards as the state's only officially designated honors college for the State of Louisiana.

== Curriculum ==
The Scholars' College curriculum has four distinct components:

- The Common Curriculum
- Academic Major
- Senior Colloquium and Thesis
- Electives

=== The Common Curriculum ===
All students develop a common core of knowledge in mathematics, philosophy, literature, science, history, languages, and the fine and performing arts. By completing the Common Curriculum, all students satisfy the requirements for the Certificate of Excellence in undergraduate education awarded by the State Board of Regents.

==== Texts and Traditions I–IV: The Shaping of Western Thought ====
A central vehicle of the College's commitment to multidisciplinary inquiry, the development of critical thinking skills, and the expression of those skills, Texts and Traditions seminars are a major component of the student's course of study in the first two years. Students move chronologically from antiquity through the twentieth century, studying works by such figures as Homer, Plato, Sappho, Sophocles, Dante, Shakespeare, Galileo, Swift, Austen, Marx, Darwin, Dostoevsky, Conrad, Freud, Woolf, Levi-Strauss, and others. The reading lists for "T 'n T" are revised annually.

==== Democratic Vistas ====
The Democratic Vistas course explores essential works from the American cultural tradition. This course includes representative texts by such figures as Franklin, Jefferson, Madison, de Tocqueville, Emerson, Hawthorne, Douglass, Whitman, Dickinson, James, Veblen, Faulkner, Morrison, and others, and includes an examination of music, painting, and photography in addition to literary works. As with "T 'n T", the reading list for "DV" is revised annually.

==== Paradigms of Nature ====
The several Paradigms of Nature courses explore essential elements of mathematics and the natural sciences over four semesters, developing skill in quantitative reasoning and experimental procedure, together with an understanding of the main theoretical postulates of modern science.

In the one credit-hour Science Seminar, students read, discuss, and analyze works of general interest concerning science topics.

==== Writing ====
Writing-intensive seminars are offered to first-year students on various topics. Offerings have included Music and World Cultures, Selfhood and Community, Writing About Film, Southern Fiction, and Interdisciplinary Approaches to Gender. The College offers options in French, Spanish, Russian, Greek, and Latin, and requires that students study at least four semesters of a language of their choice.

=== Academic Major ===
While completing the Common Curriculum, a student may choose to develop a more individualized program in one of the concentrations within the major in Liberal Arts, or may choose to pursue a traditional major. Each student is assisted in this decision-making process by an academic advisor within the Scholars' College.

==== The Liberal Arts Major ====
Scholars' College offers the Bachelor of Arts in Liberal Arts, along with a Master's of English obtained in only five years, with six areas of concentration. The areas of concentration are:

- Fine and Performing Arts
- Foreign Languages
- Philosophy, Politics, and Law (formerly, History and Philosophy of Science)
- Humanities and Social Thought
- Scientific Inquiry
- Classical Studies

The concentration allows the student, with the advice of a faculty member, to develop a cohesive course of study which has a common theme, but which may combine a number of disciplines.

==== Traditional Majors ====
A student may choose one of sixteen traditional majors which include:

- Accounting
- Biology
- Business Administration
- Chemistry
- Criminal Justice
- Education
- Electronic Engineering Technology
- English
- Fine and Graphic Arts
- Health and Exercise Science
- History
- Industrial Engineering Technology
- Music
- Political Science
- Psychology
- Theater
- Unified Public Safety Administration

These majors are offered within the guidelines established by agreements with departments of NSU. Students must complete all requirements, or their equivalent, for this major in addition to the Scholars' College Common Curriculum. In some cases, the student will be assigned an advisor within the appropriate NSU department in addition to his or her Scholars' College major advisor.

=== Senior Colloquium and Thesis ===
==== Senior Colloquium ====
The Senior Colloquium, which extends over the entire senior year, examines some issue of contemporary concern, chosen collaboratively by the faculty of the College and the junior class. With a common list of important written works serving as points of departure, students in their senior year meet weekly for two hours to attend lectures and presentations by College and University faculty, outside speakers, and students of the class, followed by lively discussion. Topics are chosen on the basis of their significance and contemporary urgency, the disciplinary range they embrace, and the mutual interests of students and faculty. Past topics have included:

- Disease and Public Policy (1990–1991)
- Liberty and the First Amendment (1991–1992)
- Environmental Science, Environmental Policy: Local Issues and Global Concerns (1992–1993)
- AIDS: Societal Changes and Cultural Impacts (1993–1994) (**Need additional confirmation for this title**)
- Education for the Twenty-First Century: Needed Improvements (1994–1995)
- Multiculturalism and American Society in the Global Economic Community (1995–1996)
- Mediated Realities: the Media and National Values (1996–1997)
- Crime and Punishment in the Modern World (1997–1998)
- Science and Religion: The Scopes Trial and Its Consequences (1998–1999)
- The Drug Culture: Pharmacology, Economics, and the Law (1999–2000)
- The Nineties: A Critical Retrospective (2000–2001)
- The Sixties (2001–2002)
- Censorship: Who Judges the Judges Themselves? (2002–2003)
- Religious Tolerance (2003–2004)
- Sex and Society (2004–2005)
- Unknown title for Pop culture topic (2005–2006)
- Unknown title for Documentary films topic (2006–2007)
- Unknown title for possible Drugs topic (2007–2008)
- Food: Basic Necessity to Metaphoric Image (2008–2009)
- Topic unknown (2009–2010)
- World Mythology (2010–2011)
- Unknown title for Gender studies topic (2011–2012)

After school year 2011–2012, Senior Colloquium was replaced by the one-credit course Liberal Arts in Practice.

==== Thesis ====
Extending over the whole of the senior year, the thesis is the culmination of each student's work in his or her area of study. The student works with one or more faculty members and demonstrates their familiarity with the existing work in his or her field as well as their ability to carry out an extended research project. The thesis is presented to the College at the end of the senior year, and a bound copy is kept in the College's thesis room.

=== Electives ===
All students complete electives depending on the hours remaining after completing either a major or the concentration.

== Campus life ==
The Louisiana Scholars’ College Forum Council, the student-led "governing" body (much like SGA), hosts many events throughout the year; these events invite students and teachers to connect and form lasting friendships. Often, the events are themed and have included Halloween and Christmas themes. Scholars' College students are also active in various NSU organizations, including Student Government Association, Student Activities Board, and many sororities and fraternities.
