= Maria College =

Catholic college in Albany, New York, US

- Motto: Transforming Careers
- Type: Private college
- Established: 1958
- Accreditation: MSCHE
- Religious affiliation: Roman Catholic Church (Religious Sisters of Mercy)
- Academic affiliations: CIC; ACCU
- President: Lynn Ortale
- Academic staff: 43 FT/ 84 PT (2023)
- Students: 752 (2023)
- Undergraduates: 703 (2023)
- Postgraduates: 49 (2023)
- Location: Albany, New York, U.S.
- Colors: Blue, white, and gold
- Website: www.mariacollege.edu

Maria College is a private Catholic college in Albany, New York, United States.

== History ==
Maria College was founded in 1958 by the Religious Sisters of Mercy to serve as a sister formation college, an institution where aspiring Sisters of Mercy could receive a college degree that would qualify them to teach. Under the leadership of Maria College's first President, Sister Mary Borromeo, the focus on educating only religious sisters slowly changed, and the college received permission to open its doors to the public in 1964.

Originally chartered by the New York Board of Regents as a junior college, Maria College offered a number of associate degrees in areas ranging from early childhood education to business management. Degree emphasis later changed to the health professions, with particular emphasis on nursing, physical therapy assistant and occupational therapy assistant programs. The charter was changed in September 2013 to allow Maria College to become a baccalaureate degree-granting institution, offering degrees in liberal arts, psychology, healthcare management, occupational therapy, and nursing.

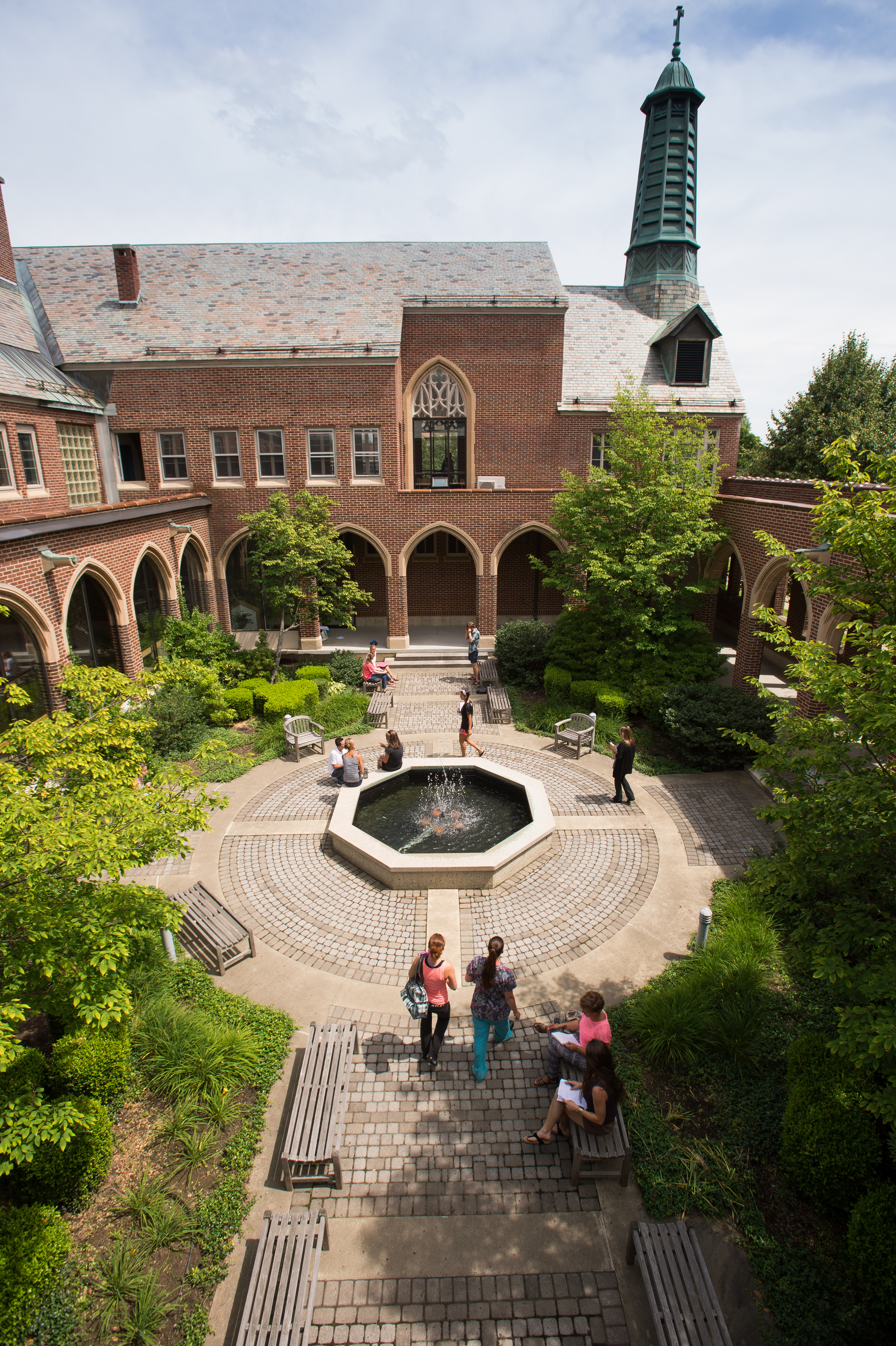
Maria College, July 2014

In 2020, Maria College's charter was changed to becoming a graduate degree-granting institution, and in Summer 2022 Maria's first class of Master's students graduated in the Occupational Therapy, MSOT program.

== Academics ==
The college offers certificates as well as associate and bachelor's degree programs in a variety of disciplines. It is accredited by the Middle States Commission on Higher Education.

Maria College is one of 17 colleges and universities sponsored by the national Conference for Mercy Higher Education network. Together the institutions in this network enroll more than 40,000 students throughout the United States.
