= Mildred Elley =

American private college

Coordinates: 42.68073°N 73.78868°W

- Motto: Latin: Successus per Constantiam
- Motto in English: Success through work
- Type: Private for-profit college
- Established: 1917; 109 years ago
- Affiliations: University of the State of New York
- President: Faith A. Takes
- Students: 1,200
- Undergraduates: 1,200
- Location: Albany, NY, United States
- Campus: Albany, NY; New York, NY; Pittsfield, MA
- Website: www.mildred-elley.edu

Mildred Elley is a private, for-profit college offering two-year programs as well as professional certifications with campuses in Albany, and New York City, New York and in Pittsfield, Massachusetts. Founded in 1917 by Augusta Mildred Elley, a local woman who was educated at a college in New York City, the school initially educated women for secretarial positions. With installation of a new president in 1985, the school expanded its programs and secured degree-granting authority from the Board of Regents of the University of the State of New York.
