= CUNY School of Medicine =

Medical school of the City University of New York

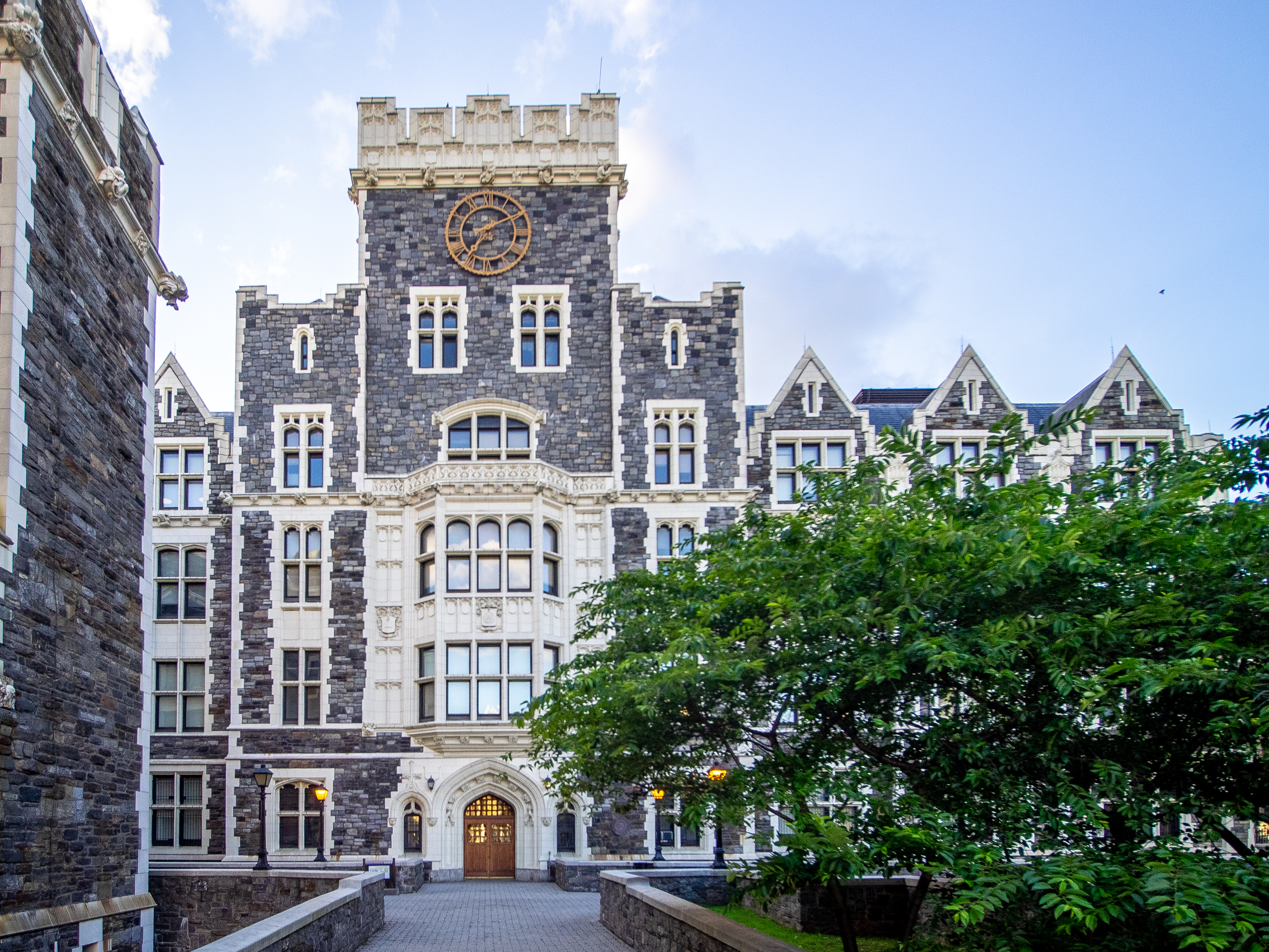
- Townsend Harris Hall, designed by architect George B. Post and named after Townsend Harris, the founder of City College
- Former name: Sophie Davis School of Biomedical Education
- Motto: Healers, Leaders, and Scholars
- Type: Public medical school
- Established: 2015
- Parent institution: The City University of New York
- Affiliations: The City College of New York
- Dean: Carmen Renée Green, M.D.
- Faculty: 117
- Students: 500
- Location: New York, New York, USA; 40.820833°N 73.950000°W
- Campus: Urban
- Colors: Green
- Website: medicine.cuny.edu

The CUNY School of Medicine (CUNY Medicine) is the medical school of the City University of New York (CUNY). Founded in 2015 on the campus of The City College of New York, CUNY Medicine became the only public medical school in Manhattan and the first public MD-granting school to open in New York City since 1860.

The school partners with St. Barnabas Hospital (Bronx), Harlem Hospital Center of NYC Health + Hospitals, and Staten Island University Hospital of Northwell Health for clinical medical education.

The main pathway for admission to the CUNY School of Medicine is through the Sophie Davis Biomedical Education Program, an accelerated seven-year BS/MD program.

CUNY Medicine also offers a two-year M.S. program in Physician Assistant studies.

== History ==
The CUNY School of Medicine has its roots in 1973 when the Sophie Davis School of Biomedical Education was founded. This institution was named in honor of Sophie Davis (née Kesner), the wife of Colonial Penn founder Leonard Davis, a graduate of CCNY and a major benefactor. Its purpose was to address the increasing demand for primary care physicians in the United States, particularly in urban areas. The Sophie Davis School admits students primarily from high schools all across New York State and attracts talented graduates from diverse cultural and ethnic backgrounds in New York City, with a focus on minority students, including those of African-American and Hispanic descent. The school offers a challenging curriculum, and approximately 40% of its graduates pursue careers as primary care physicians.

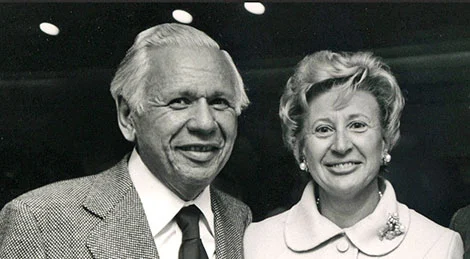
Leonard and Sophie Davis

Before the start of its current seven-year curriculum, students completed their undergraduate education (B.S.) and the first two years of medical school at Sophie Davis. After passing the USMLE Step 1, they transferred to one of several affiliated medical schools to complete the final two years, which primarily consisted of medical rotations, and earn their Doctor of Medicine (M.D.) degree. The schools that accepted Sophie Davis graduates included NYU School of Medicine, SUNY Downstate Medical Center, New York Medical College, Albany Medical College, Northeast Ohio Medical University, Dartmouth Medical School, and Stony Brook School of Medicine.

In 2016, the Sophie Davis School of Biomedical Education was renamed as the Sophie Davis Biomedical Education Program when it became part of the CUNY School of Medicine. Upon completing the accelerated three-year Sophie Davis Biomedical Education Program, students receive a Bachelor of Science degree in Biomedical Sciences from The City College of New York and gain direct admission to the CUNY School of Medicine, without the need to take the Medical College Admissions Test (MCAT). After finishing the traditional four-year medical school curriculum, students are awarded the Doctor of Medicine degree. The CUNY School of Medicine no longer requires graduates to commit to a career in primary care.

== Mission and outcomes ==
The CUNY School of Medicine has a clear mission: to increase the number of underrepresented minorities in the field of medicine, encourage its students to pursue post-graduate training in primary care, and ultimately practice medicine in areas of New York State facing healthcare shortages. The school stands out in several key areas. It holds the top rank in New York State and the third rank in the entire United States for the enrollment of female medical students. Moreover, it holds the first rank in New York State and the fifth rank in the United States for the number of underrepresented minorities graduating with an M.D. degree, making it one of the top four medical schools nationally in recruiting African-American students.

The statistics from the CUNY School of Medicine demonstrate that 65% of its graduates choose to practice medicine in New York State, surpassing any other medical school in the state. Furthermore, 41% of its graduates opt for careers in primary care, placing the CUNY School of Medicine among the top 10 medical schools in the U.S. in terms of producing primary care physicians. Additionally, 26% of its graduates decide to practice in healthcare shortage areas within New York State.

Over the past decade, the school has maintained a commitment to diversity, with approximately 42% of its enrolled students coming from underrepresented minority backgrounds.

The CUNY School of Medicine's Residency Match Rate for 2026 was 98%.The average national residency match rate is 93.5%. Previous years were as follows: 2025- 100%, 2024- 96.5%, 2023- 100%, 2022- 98%, 2021- 98%, 2020-100%.

== Location ==
The school's address is 160 Convent Ave, Townsend Harris Hall, New York, NY 10031.

In 2003, it moved into its permanent home in Townsend Harris Hall, which had been renovated as part of CCNY's Terra Cotta Restoration Project, and to build modern teaching capabilities into its classrooms, seminar rooms, a long-distance conference room, and teaching laboratories.

== Notable alumni ==
- Jonathan Woodson, M.D. (Class of 1977), Assistant Secretary of Defense for Health Affairs and Director of TRICARE Management Activity
