= Guttman Community College =

Community college in New York City

Stella and Charles Guttman Community College
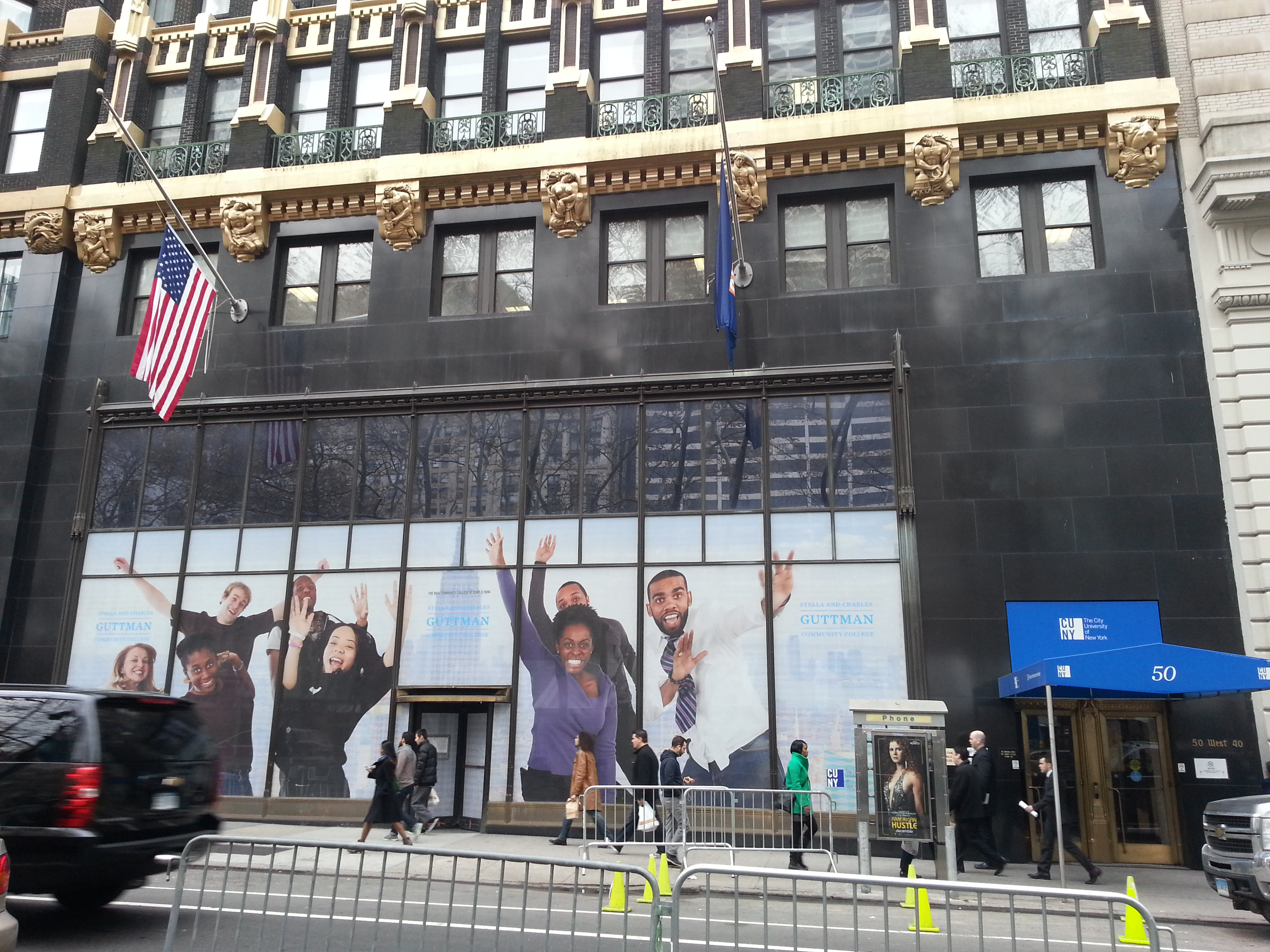
- Former name: New Community College
- Type: Public community college
- Established: 2011; 15 years ago
- Parent institution: City University of New York
- President: Elizabeth de León Bhargava
- Provost: Paul Reifenheiser
- Academic staff: 47 full-time faculty*26 part-time faculty
- Students: 1,136 (as of Fall 2025)
- Location: New York City, New York, United States; 40.7529°N 73.9841°W
- Campus: Urban
- Website: guttman.cuny.edu
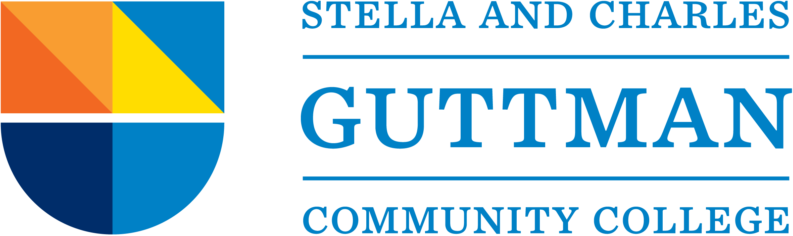

Stella and Charles Guttman Community College is a public community college in New York City. It is the newest of the City University of New York's (CUNY) community colleges and was founded on September 11, 2011. It opened on August 20, 2012 as New Community College. In April 2013 the college was renamed following a $15 million endowment from the Stella and Charles Guttman Foundation.

Guttman offers associate degree programs with majors in liberal arts, sciences, business, human services, information technology (IT), and urban studies. Students are accepted with either a high school diploma or Certificate of High School Equivalency.

== History ==
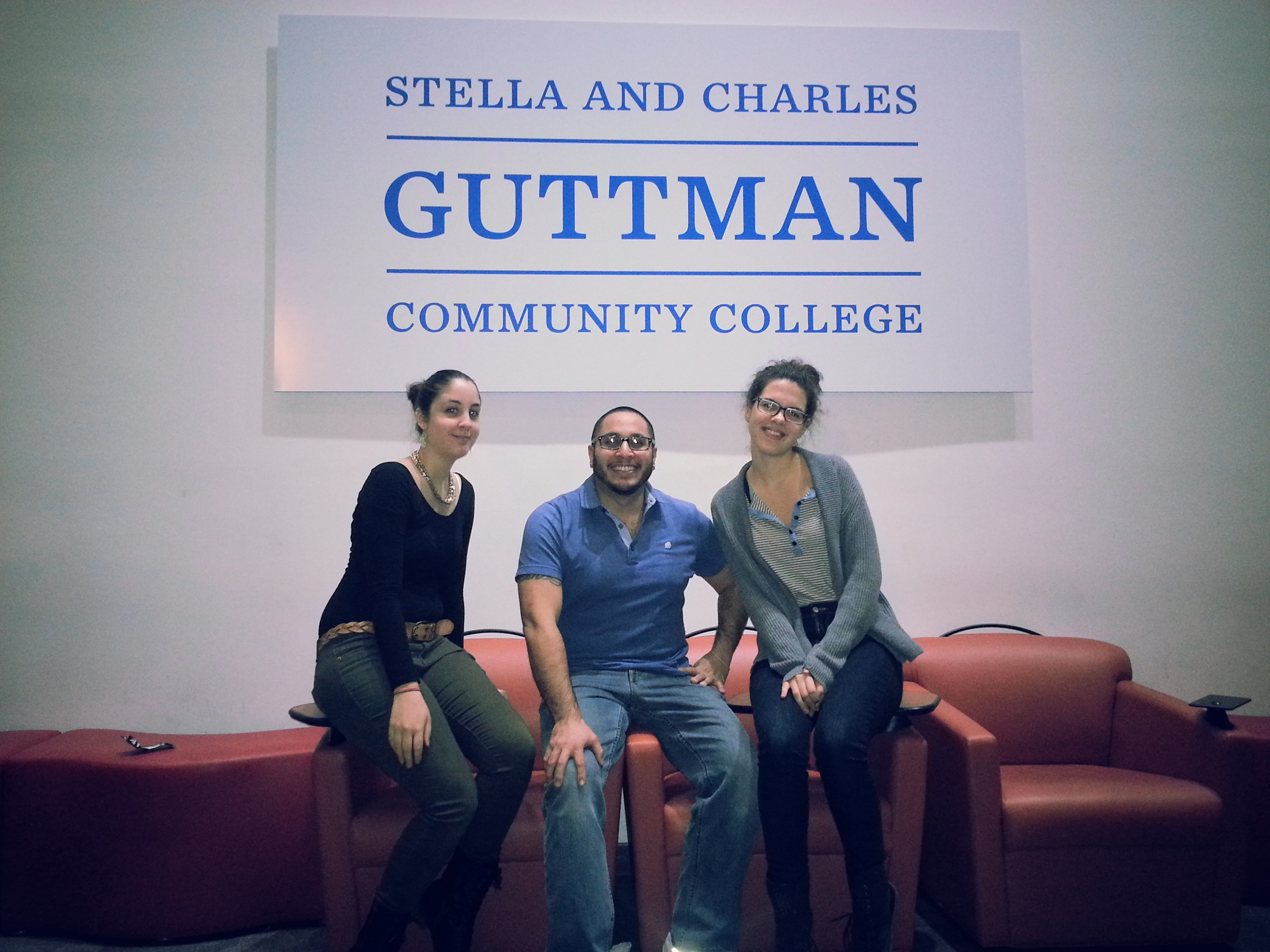
Three members of the founding class of Guttman Community College

Guttman was the first community college established by the City University of New York (CUNY) in over 40 years. The planning was begun in 2008 on the initiative of CUNY's Chancellor at the time, Matthew Goldstein. The planning phase was supported by CUNY funds, an initial allocation $8.9 million from the City of New York's annual budget, and donations from the Bill and Melinda Gates Foundation and Michael Bloomberg's Center for Economic Opportunity. Described by The New York Times as "a multimillion-dollar experiment in how to fix what ails community colleges," Guttman College's academic structure and curriculum were designed from scratch in an effort to improve students' chances of completing their associate degrees and transferring to four-year colleges for further study.

In 2010, the first faculty members were appointed, and Scott E. Evenbeck, professor of psychology and dean of University College at Indiana University-Purdue University Indianapolis, was named the founding President, taking up his post in January 2011. The college was officially established on September 11, 2011 and opened with its first intake of students in August 2012. The college had, and continues to have, an open admissions policy, provided students have a high school diploma or a Certificate of High School Equivalency. However, unlike any of the other schools within CUNY, applicants are not considered until they have attended a lengthy information session and one-on-one interviews with counselors. Of its initial 4,000 applicants, 504 went through the information session and interviews. Of those, approximately 300 decided to enroll in the founding class.

The college opened under the name "New Community College". In April 2013—after the Stella and Charles Guttman Foundation gifted a $25 million endowment, one of the largest ever donations to a public two-year college—the CUNY Board of Trustees passed a resolution renaming the college "Stella and Charles Guttman Community College".

In 2024, the Stella and Charles Guttman Foundation sued CUNY, claiming that the money was not used properly, as a new facility was not constructed for the college. They requested that $21 million be reimbursed to the charity.

== Public transit access ==
The closest station to Guttman Community College is 42nd Street-Bryant Park/Fifth Avenue, which is served by the B, D, F, M, and 7 trains. It can also be reached with local and express buses around the area.
