= New York City College of Technology =

Technical college in Brooklyn, New York

- Type: Public college
- Established: 1946 (as New York State Institute for Applied Arts and Sciences)
- Parent institution: City University of New York
- Endowment: $12 million
- President: Milton Santiago (interim)
- Provost: Pamela Brown
- Faculty: 425 full-time, 1,049 part-time
- Students: 17,000+
- Location: New York City, New York, U.S. 40.6958°N 73.9880°W
- Campus: Urban
- Colors: Blue & gold
- Nickname: Yellow Jackets
- Website: www.citytech.cuny.edu

The New York City College of Technology (City Tech) is a public college in New York City. Founded in 1946, it is the City University of New York's college of technology. Its main urban campus is located in Downtown Brooklyn.

== History ==
City Tech was founded in 1946 as The New York State Institute of Applied Arts and Sciences, as one of five institutes established that year by the legislature of the State of New York. The urgent mission at the time was to provide training to GIs returning from the Second World War and to provide New York with the technically proficient workforce it would need to thrive in the emerging post-war economy. The initial three programs offered were Retail Distribution and Commerce, Commercial Art and Industrial Design, and Dental Laboratory Technology.

From its beginnings as an Institute—to being chartered as a community college—and subsequently transitioning to senior college status during the 1980s—it has grown from serving 246 students in 1946, to a population today of more than 30,000 degree and non-degree seeking students.

In 1971, the Voorhees Technical Institute (originally founded as part of the Metropolitan Museum of Art Schools in 1880, and then as the New York Trade School until 1961) was acquired by City Tech. It had its own building at 450 West 41st Street, operated until 1987.

Past programs at City Tech have included classes for detainees at the Brooklyn House of Detention. In 1974, thirty individuals received certificates for completion of continuing education programs there.

Voorhees Technical Institute
- Former names: The New York Trade School (1881–1961), The Technical Schools of the Metropolitan Museum of Art (1880)
- Type: Private
- Active: 1881–1971 (acq. by New York City Community College of City University)
- Location: New York City, New York, USA
- Campus: Urban

New York City Community College
- Former names: The New York State Institute for Applied Arts & Sciences (1946–1953)
- Type: Public
- Active: 1946–1964 (Joined City University System)
- Location: Brooklyn, New York, USA
- Campus: Urban

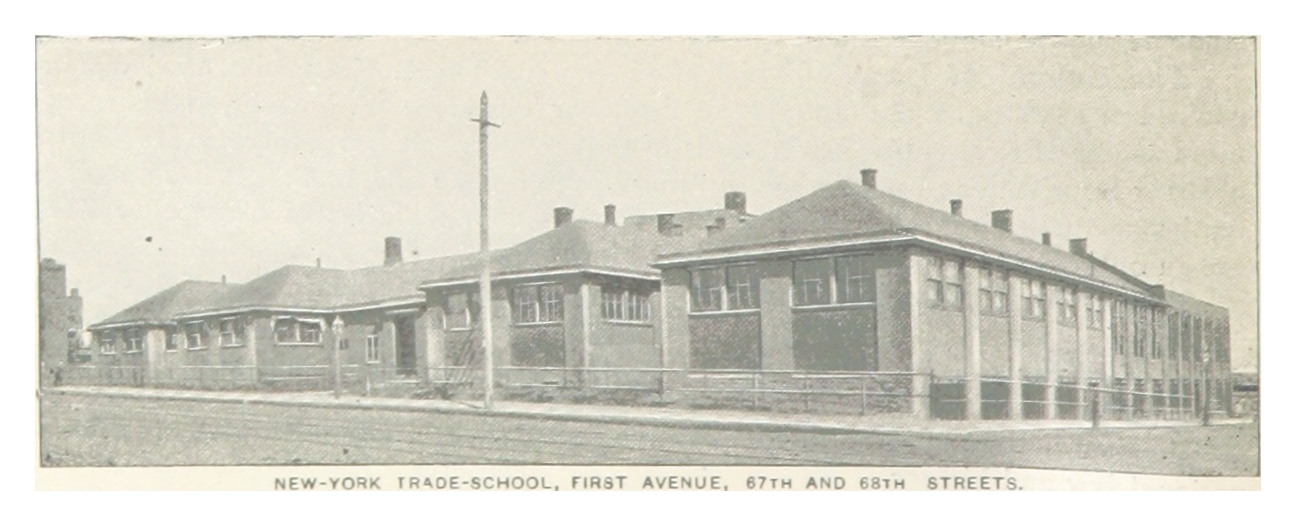
(King1893NYC) pg280 New-York Trade-School, 1893

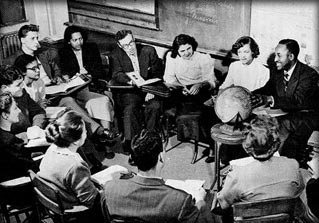
Social science class with Professor John Graves, at globe, who became executive director of the institute's Franklin Hall Annex in February 1950.

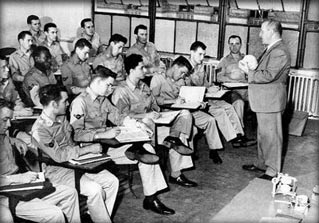
Professor Herman Wald with U.S. Air Force 3310th School Squadron dental laboratory technology class in 1951.

== Academics ==
Undergraduate demographics as of fall 2023
Race and ethnicity	Total
Hispanic	36%
Black	27%
Asian	21%
White	9%
International student	4%
Two or more races	2%
American Indian/Alaska Native	1%
Economic diversity
Low-income (Note: The percentage of students who received an income-based federal Pell grant intended for low-income students.)	58%
Affluent (Note: The percentage of students who are a part of the American middle class at the bare minimum.)	42%

City Tech has an enrollment of more than 14,000 students in 58 baccalaureate and associate degree programs including several engineering technology fields as well as architecture, construction, nursing, hospitality management, entertainment technology, dental hygiene, vision care technology, technology teacher training and paralegal training. Non-degree continuing education is also offered, and serves approximately 5,000 students each year. City Tech is accredited by the Middle States Commission on Higher Education.

The college's academics are organized into three schools:

- School of Technology and Design
- School of Professional Studies
- School of Arts and Sciences

=== Library ===
The college hired its first library director in 1957. A collection of Chinese-language materials was donated to the library in 1974 by the Chinese American Student Association. The current college library building went up around 1987. In 2012, the library staff adopted an open-access policy to make its members' professional research publicly accessible online.

== Campus ==
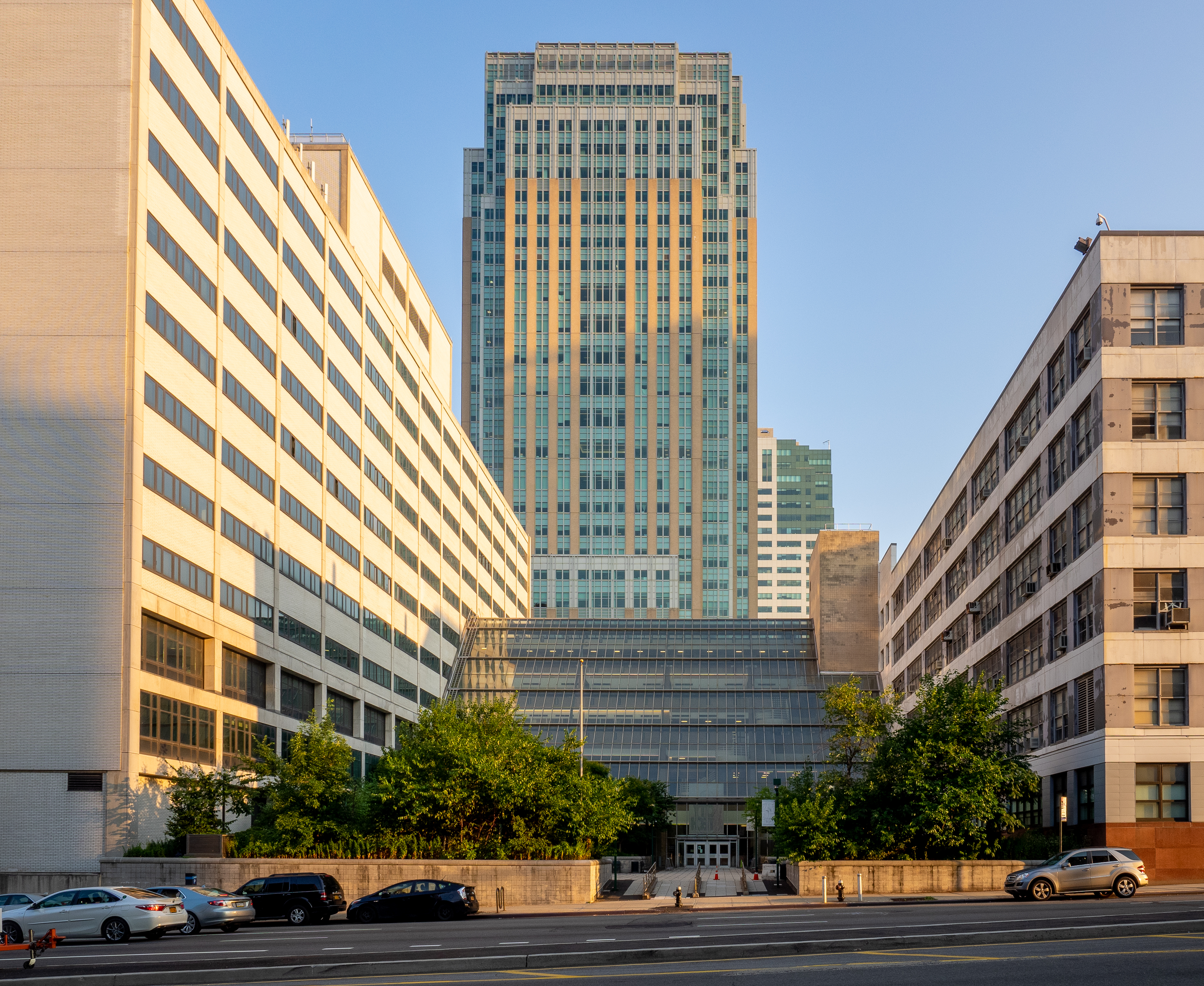
Namm Hall (left), The Atrium (bottom center), and Pearl St. Building (right) at City Tech campus

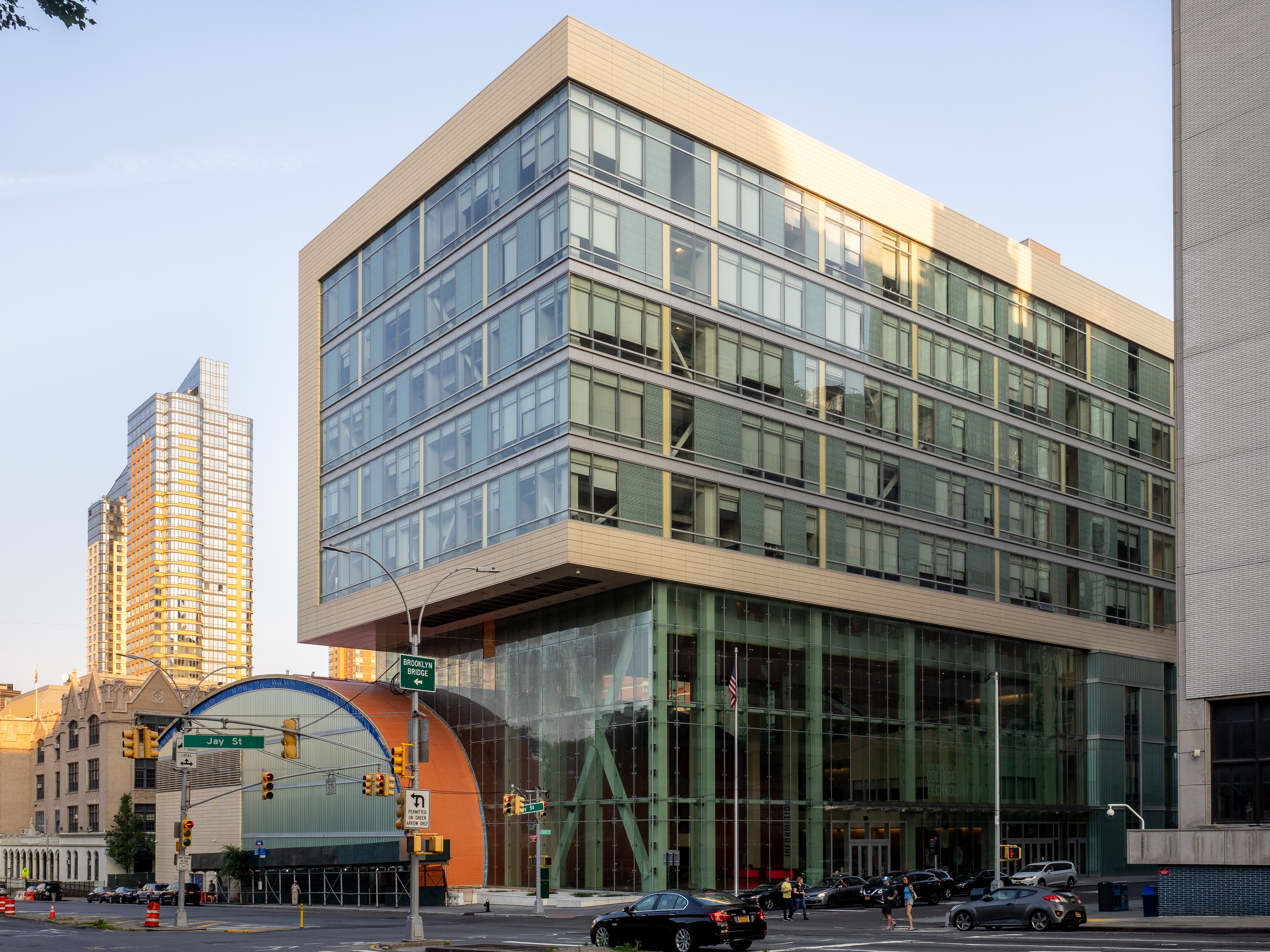
Academic Building at the corner of Tillary and Jay Streets

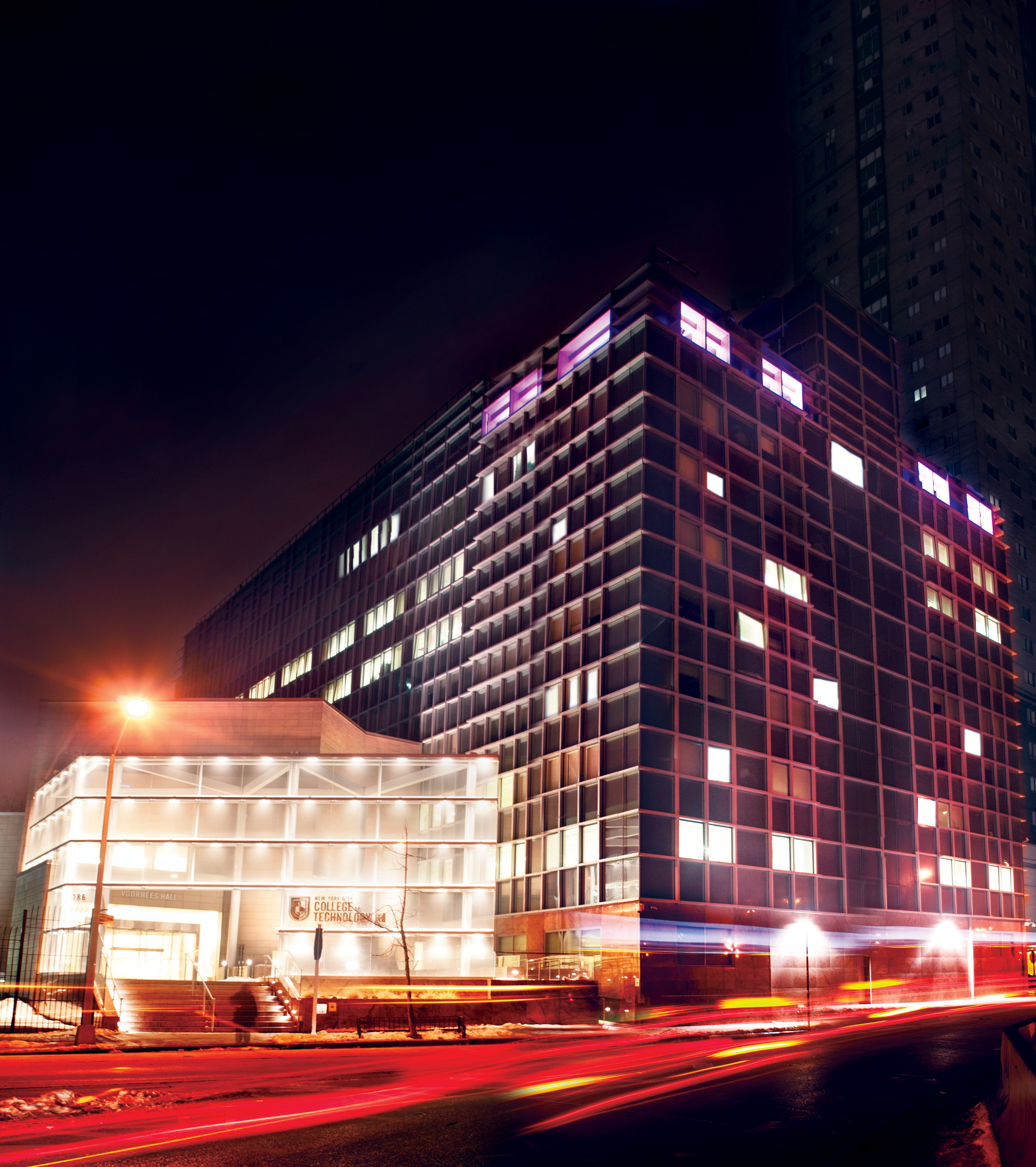
The Voorhees Building

City Tech occupies seven buildings within Downtown Brooklyn's Tech Triangle, the MetroTech Business Improvement District, and DUMBO. College Administration and Offices, the Ursula C. Schwerin Library, the School of Professional Studies, and the School of Arts & Sciences are primarily based in a complex formed by the Namm, Library (formerly Atrium), General, and Pearl buildings in MetroTech (300 Jay Street). The School of Technology & Design is primarily based in Voorhees Hall in DUMBO.

A supertall skyscraper designed by Renzo Piano—which would have been known as City Tech Tower, with 65 floors for the college and 600 units of housing—was proposed, but scrapped.

In October 2013, City Tech held a ceremonial groundbreaking for a 350,000-square-foot (33,000 m^{2}) academic complex at the corner of Tillary and Jay Streets in Downtown Brooklyn, which opened in August 2018. The new complex occupies the site formerly occupied by the Klitgord Center. The new eight-story building, known as the Academic Complex, is home to City Tech's expanding programs in healthcare and the sciences. The departments moved into the new building include the core sciences: Physics, Chemistry and Biological Sciences (including Biomedical Informatics). It is also home to the health programs: Nursing, Radiologic Technology & Medical Imaging, Dental Hygiene, Restorative Dentistry, and Vision Care Technology. The Academic Complex includes a 1,000-seat concert hall quality auditorium, the largest of its kind in Downtown Brooklyn. A wellness center and faculty office space is also located in the Academic Complex.

== Athletics ==
City Tech teams participated as a member of the National Collegiate Athletic Association's Division III. City Tech began CUNYAC competition in the community college section from the conference's inception in the 1987–88 season, later to join its senior college section in the 1999–2000 season. Men's sports included basketball, cross country, soccer, tennis and volleyball; women's sports included basketball, cross country, softball, tennis and volleyball. City Tech's athletic program is in hiatus until new facilities are available.

== Notable people ==
=== Alumni ===
- Eric Adams, 111th mayor of New York City (2022–2025); 18th borough president of Brooklyn (2014–2021)
- Hiroaki Aoki (Restaurant Management, 1963), Olympic wrestler and founder of the Benihana chain of restaurants
- Charles Barron, New York City Council member representing the 42nd District of New York City; former Black Panther
- Moses Michael Levi Barrow (born Jamal Michael Barrow; 1978), better known by his stage name Shyne, Belizean rapper and politician
- Zev Brenner, Orthodox Jewish radio host; president and founder of Talkline Communications
- Salvatore Cassano (Fire Protection, 1970), New York City fire commissioner
- Patrick Clark (Hotel and Restaurant Technology), chef
- Larry R. Felix (1980), director of the Bureau of Engraving and Printing
- Robert Holden, professor and New York City Council member
- Michael Lomonaco (Hotel and Restaurant Management, 1984), chef, restaurateur, and television personality
- Julian Niccolini (Hospitality Management), managing partner of The Four Seasons Restaurant
- Ray Sharkey, stage, film, and TV actor (attended for one year)
- Samuel E Vázquez (1991), visual artist
- William Yosses (Hotel Management), White House executive pastry chef; co-author of the book Desserts For Dummies

=== Faculty ===
- Leon M. Goldstein (c. 1932–1999), president of Kingsborough Community College, and acting chancellor of the City University of New York
- Dorothy E. Hayes (1935–2015), graphic designer, educator
- Frank McCourt (1930–2009), Pulitzer Prize-winning author of Angela's Ashes, taught in the English department
- Rob Redding, talk host, journalist, author, and artist
- Norma Merrick Sklarek (1926–2012), first African-American woman licensed to practice architecture in New York and California; Harlem-born, Columbia University graduate; taught architecture courses in the mid-1950s
