= Jane Maud Campbell =

American librarian and multiculturalism proponent

- Campbell c. 1900
- Born: March 13, 1869; Liverpool, England
- Died: April 24, 1947 (aged 78); Lynchburg, Virginia
- Other name: J. Maud Campbell
- Occupation: librarian

Jane Maud Campbell (March 13, 1869 – April 24, 1947) was a librarian known for being an early advocate for multiculturalism in libraries through her service to immigrant and minority populations. Campbell believed in cultural pluralism–that there was no one "American culture"–so while she supported immigrants' learning English and eventually becoming citizens, she was supportive of them maintaining their own cultures and interests.

== Early life and education ==
Campbell was born on March 13, 1869, in Liverpool, England. Her parents, George and Jane (Cameron) Campbell, were Scots who had met and married in Petersburg, Virginia. Her father had a shipping business, so the family moved back and forth between the UK and the US. Her mother died and her father remarried Rosalie Higgenbotham of Richmond, Virginia. Campbell was educated at home by governesses, in Virginia from age 12-14, and then at the Ladies College of Edinburgh University where she studied literature. She graduated and went on to earn a certificate from the Edinburgh School of Cookery and Domestic Economy. She settled in America permanently in the late 1880s, working domestically with her family and briefly as a bookkeeper for the family tanning supply business in Charles Town, West Virginia.

== Career ==
In 1901, Campbell got a job working assistant in the reference department of the Newark Public Library; she was the only staff member at the time who could type. She worked under Frank Pierce Hill and learned many of the principles of librarianship. Newark had a foreign-born population of over 30 percent at that time and Campbell worked establishing traveling libraries and small satellite libraries in stores throughout the city. As a result, in 1904, the Passaic library had books in French, German, Dutch, Italian, Hungarian, Russian, Bohemian, Slovenian, Polish, Hebrew, and Yiddish.

She became head of public libraries in Passaic, New Jersey, and became concerned with the situation of newly-arrived immigrants. She stocked the library with foreign-language materials, not always the agreed-upon route for helping immigrants to America assimilate. Her approach was described as "a step away from Americanization and a step closer to cultural pluralism or multiculturalism." She worked with leaders of the immigrant communities, as well as editors of the foreign-language papers and immigrant booksellers to get advice on selection and processing of books for the library system.

Campbell would frequently travel to professional association meetings and conferences to stress her view that the public library should be "purely democratic institution existing to serve the will of its constituents," a more accepted fact in library culture in modern times than it was in her time. She served on a 1906 New Jersey Immigration Commission with John Dyneley Prince and D. F. Merritt, created "to inquire into and report upon the general condition of the immigrants coming into or residents within this State." Campbell was the only woman on the commission, which persuaded the legislature to provide free evening classes for immigrants.

== North American Civic League for Immigrants ==
Campbell joined the New York City Committee of the North American Civic League for Immigrants in 1910 as education secretary, working directly with immigrants, helping them with the naturalization process and with employment opportunities as American citizens. They used using ships' manifests at Ellis Island to compile lists of school-age children entering New York so that they could be registered for school. Eventually this work was taken over by federal authorities.

During the summer of 1911 as the Catskill Aqueduct was being built, Campbell began visiting labor camps along the aqueduct construction route and provided moving pictures with musical accompaniment. These films, which she showed using hints from her father's friend Thomas Edison, gave advice on health and hygiene regulations, state and federal laws, the naturalization process, and technical instruction on aqueduct construction. These were combined with recreational movies on Saturday nights. The experiment went on for three months and reached 7,000 viewers.

She continued her work in immigrant laborer education by creating elementary English lessons based on the words laborers would need to use in their construction jobs. These were published in English/Italian and English/Polish, the most frequently spoken languages. She oversaw the creation of pamphlets explaining concepts such as naturalization requirements, the basic laws of the United States, including child labor and education laws.

== Massachusetts Free Public Library Commission ==
Campbell relocated to Brookline, Massachusetts and was appointed Educational Director for Work with Aliens of the Massachusetts Free Public Library Commission (MFPLC) in 1913, the first such post in the United States. She conducted a statewide survey of library resources and services available to immigrants, and worked with town libraries statewide, helping them select and deliver foreign language books. She and was an advocate for the important role libraries could play in the education of immigrants, seeing her role as to "awaken the social conscience" of librarians and other immigrant advocates.

By 1914, nineteen traveling libraries in French, Italian, and Polish, were available throughout the state. She received financial support from foreign societies as well as American patriotic societies. Some foreign governments even donated books, such as the King Oscar’s Traveling Libraries of books in Swedish for Swedish-speaking immigrants. Campbell continued to make bibliographies of foreign-language materials available, in over 20 languages, mainly through the publications of the Massachusetts Library Club. She worked at Camp Devens during World War I, planning and implementing programs for non-English-speaking soldiers, and organizing a hospital library for convalescing soldiers. While she continued her work for MFPLC, she was increasingly being asked to consult for other states with regions with large immigrant populations such as Detroit and Cleveland. She became dismayed that despite her expanded roles at MFPLC her salary had not increased in seven years.

== Lynchburg, Virginia ==
Campbell left Massachusetts on December 31, 1921 to become head librarian of the Jones Memorial Library in Lynchburg, Virginia. The Jones Memorial Library was a privately endowed white library but functioned as the de facto public library of Lynchburg. Campbell specifically worked to acquire the works of Virginia authors, and the library had an outstanding collection of Virginiana, considered one of the most complete outside of the University of Virginia and the State Library of Virginia. Under her tenure the collection grew from 6,500 to 70,000 volumes. Campbell was one of the first presidents of the Virginia Library Association, which was formed in the late 1920s.

Campbell helped establish branch libraries for Black readers. Despite being burdened with operating the library under segregation, Campbell worked to try to establish equitable service to Black citizens, sending trucks of books to the local public schools including the segregated African American high school. At this school, she later set up the Dunbar branch and appointed poet Anne Spencer as the librarian. She set up a second branch library within the Robert E. Lee Junior High School. Both of these libraries were later taken over by the schools themselves. She retired in February, 1947.

She died on April 24, 1947. She is buried in Spring Hill Cemetery, in Lynchburg. Her papers are held by Harvard University.
