= Wilmer L. Hall =

American author, editor, and librarian (1885–1957)

State Librarian of Virginia
- In office 1934–1946
- Preceded by: Henry Read McIlwaine
- Succeeded by: Randolph Warner Church

Personal details
- Born: July 20, 1885 Virginia, U.S.
- Died: January 25, 1957 (aged 71) Richmond, Virginia, U.S.
- Resting place: Woodland Cemetery
- Education: Randolph–Macon College; University of Chicago

Wilmer Lee Hall (July 20, 1885 – January 25, 1957) was an American author, editor, and librarian. He served as the State Librarian for the Commonwealth of Virginia.

== Early life and education ==
Hall was born on July 20, 1885 in Ruther Glen and raised in Ashland, Virginia. He was a graduate of Randolph–Macon College, and received a master's degree from the University of Chicago.

== Career ==
After college, Hall worked for the Library of Virginia in various roles including research librarian, cataloguer, and head of the department of archives. From 1916 to 1920, he was a librarian at the New York State Library. In 1920, he became the deputy state librarian of Virginia. In 1934, Hall became the State Librarian of Virginia, succeeding Henry Read McIlwaine. In the 1940s, Hall worked with the Works Progress Administration to implement a bookmobile program in Virginia. After serving as state librarian, he continued to work for the library as its director of publications until his retirement in 1956.

He was an editor of various historical volumes relating to the early governance of Virginia, including editorial oversight of A Bibliography of Virginia and three volumes of the Executive Journals of the Council of Colonial Virginia. Hall was the editor of the 1743–1793 vestry book of the upper parish of Nansemond County, Virginia, published in 1950. Hall was chairman of the catalog committee of the American Library Association and a guest author for Library Journal and the South Atlantic Quarterly.

In 1936, Hall was elected as president of the Virginia Library Association and also served as president of the National Association of State Libraries.

== Death ==
Hall died on January 25, 1957 at the age of 71 in Richmond, Virginia. He is interred at Woodland Cemetery in Ashland.

== Awards and honors ==
In 1942, Hall was a recipient of an honorary Legum Doctor degree from Randolph–Macon College.
