= Aviary (disambiguation) =

An aviary is a large enclosure for confining birds.

Aviary may also refer to:

- Aviary (album), a 2018 album by Julia Holter
- The Aviary (album)
- The Aviary (2005 film)
- The Aviary (2022 film)
- Aviary (Lynchburg, Virginia), United States, a historic aviary
- The Aviary (bar), Chicago, Illinois, United States, a craft cocktail bar
- Aviary (restaurant), Portland, Oregon, United States, a former restaurant
- Aviary (image editor), a photo-editing software for iOS, Android, and the web
- The Aviary (group), a research group
