= Nolan T. Yelich =

American librarian

- Born: June 20, 1942; Wisconsin
- Occupation: former State Librarian of Virginia

Nolan T. Yelich (born 1942) served as the Librarian of Virginia from 1996 until his retirement in 2007, after 39 years of service in American libraries.

== Early life and education ==
Yelich was born in Wisconsin and earned a bachelor's and master's degrees from the University of Wisconsin. Yelich also completed an advanced graduate program in American studies at the University of Maryland.

== Career ==
Yelich came to Virginia in 1968 to serve as the director of public services for the Earl Gregg Swem Library at the College of William and Mary and in 1973, he joined the staff of what is now the Library of Virginia.

Yelich served as president of the Virginia Library Association and the Virginia School Boards Association, chairman of the Williamsburg/James City County School Board and the Public Library Association's White House Conference Planning Committee.

== See also ==
- Library science
