= Patrick Henry Building =

- Virginia State Library
- U.S. National Register of Historic Places
- Virginia Landmarks Register
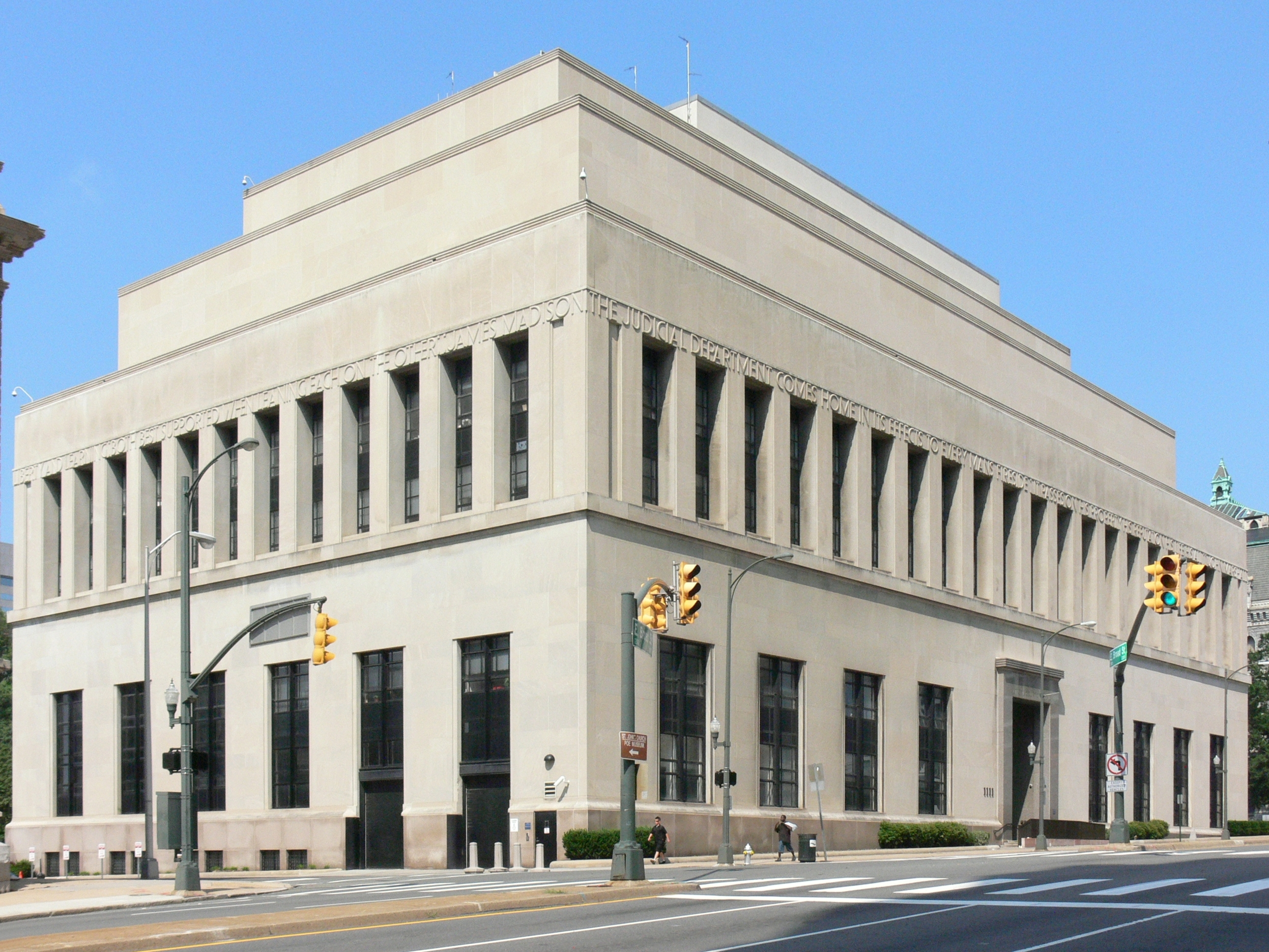
- Patrick Henry Building, August 2005

- Location within Virginia Location within the United States
- Location: 1111 E. Broad Street, Richmond, Virginia
- Coordinates: 37°32′22″N 77°25′55″W
- Built: 1938-40 (interior rebuilt 2003-2005)
- Architect: Baskervill & Son; Carneal, Johnson & Wright; Alfred Morton Githens & Francis Keally.
- Architectural style: Stripped classicism
- NRHP reference No.: 05000867
- VLR No.: 127-0188

Significant dates
- Added to NRHP: August 9, 2005
- Designated VLR: June 1, 2005

The Patrick Henry Building is a historic building located in Richmond, Virginia. Formerly designated simply as the Old State Library or the Virginia State Library and Archives and Virginia Supreme Court, it was renovated, then rededicated and renamed for the Founding Father and former Virginia Governor Patrick Henry on June 13, 2005.

== Description ==
The limestone-sheathed steel-core building was built in a modernist style for government buildings sometimes called Art Deco or Stripped Classicism. Three teams of architects designed the building: Baskerville & Son; Carneal, Johnston and Wright; and consulting architects Githens & Keally.

The minimal exterior ornamentation was intended to direct attention to the nearby Virginia State Capitol. The two main entrances refer to its original two functions, as do the quotations from famous Virginians inscribed on the four sides (all-caps removed; periods for original colons):

- The judicial department comes home in its effects to every mans fireside. It passes on his property his reputation his life his all. John Marshall (north elevation)
- Liberty and learning: both best supported when leaning on each other. James Madison (east elevation)
- Reason and free inquiry are the only effectual agents against error. They are the natural enemies of error and of error only. Thomas Jefferson (south elevation)
- A knowledge of books is the basis upon which other knowledge is to be built. George Washington (west elevation)

The extensive 2003-2005 renovation retained the original entrances and many inside Art Deco details (such as wood paneling, marble features and copper light fixtures), but modernized the plumbing, HVAC and electrical systems (removing hazardous materials). It also replaced the library stacks which had served as supportive core for the steel-frame building with modern core amenities. Some elements of the building's expansion in 1970 were also removed.

== History ==
Constructed by the Works Progress Administration during the New Deal, the building served as the home of the Supreme Court of Virginia (formerly known as the Supreme Court of Appeals per the inscription above the Broad Street entrance) until it moved to the renovated former Federal Reserve Building in 1978. The entrance facing the capitol refers to the Virginia State Library, now known as the Library of Virginia, which moved to a new building at Ninth and Broad Streets (as well as an offsite storage annex) in 1996. The Supreme Court and Library had moved from the Virginia State Library-Oliver Hill Building in 1939. This building's former reading rooms also temporarily housed Virginia General Assembly sessions in 2006 and 2007, during renovations to the capitol.

The building was added to the National Register of Historic Places in 2005, under its former name. As of 2020, the building housed the Governor's office as well as other government offices.

=== Historical marker ===
In 2017, the Virginia Department of Historic Resources dedicated a state historical marker outside the building. It tells the story of Richard and Mildred Loving, the plaintiffs in the 1967 Supreme Court case Loving v. Virginia which overturned Virginia's law against interracial marriage. The building was chosen as the site of the marker because it housed the Supreme Court of Appeals, where the Lovings' case was heard.

The marker reads:

"Loving v. Virginia

Richard Loving and Mildred Jeter, defined under Virginia's 1924 Racial Integrity Act as an interracial couple, married in June 1958 in Washington, D.C., and returned home to Caroline County. Arrested in July for violating Virginia's laws against interracial marriage, the Lovings were convicted and sentenced to one year in jail, suspended on the condition that they leave Virginia. In 1963 they obtained help from the American Civil Liberties Union, which unsuccessfully sought to reverse their convictions in the state courts of Virginia and then appealed to the U.S. Supreme Court, which, in the case Loving v. Virginia (1967), overturned all state laws restricting marriage on the basis of race."
