= Central Virginia Regional Library =

Library system serving a part of Virginia

- Location: US
- Branches: 2

Access and use
- Population served: 40,662

Other information
- Website: Central Virginia Regional Library

Central Virginia Regional Library serves Buckingham and Prince Edward counties in Virginia, United States. The library system is within Region 2 of Virginia Library Association (VLA).

== Service area ==
According to the FY 2014 Institute of Museum and Library Services Data Catalog, the Library System has a service area population of 40,662 with one central library and one branch library.

== Branches ==
- Buckingham County Public Library (Dillwyn)
- Farmville-Prince Edward Community Library (Farmville)
