= The Hornbook of Virginia History =

History book by the Library of Virginia

The Hornbook of Virginia History: A Ready-Reference Guide to the Old Dominion's People, Places, and Past
- Cover for The Hornbook of Virginia History: A Ready-Reference Guide to the Old Dominion's People, Places, and Past (1994, Fourth Edition)
- Subject: History of Virginia
- Publisher: Library of Virginia
- Publication date: 1949
- Media type: Print (hardcover)
- Pages: 336 (4th ed.)
- ISBN: 978-0-88490-177-8
- OCLC: 30892983

The Hornbook of Virginia History: A Ready-Reference Guide to the Old Dominion's People, Places, and Past is a historical reference guide and encyclopedia published by the Library of Virginia.

== Background ==
The Hornbook of Virginia History summarizes basic information the U.S. state of Virginia and provides an overview of the history of Virginia. The Library of Virginia has described the Hornbook as the "definitive, handy reference guide to Virginia's history and culture."

The first edition of the book was published in 1949 by the Virginia Department of Conservation and Development, Division of History and Archaeology, with subsequent editions in 1965, 1983, and 1994. The primary contributing authors of the 1994 edition are Emily J. Salmon and Edward D.C. Campbell.

== Content ==
The Hornbook includes an 80-page narrative overview of the history of Virginia, a listing of extinct counties and the history of Virginia's current cities and counties (along with historical population figures), listings of Virginia's officeholders from 1607 to the present, descriptions of famous landmarks and institutions in the state (including state parks, colleges and universities, churches, and other notable buildings), information about Native Americans in Virginia, brief biographical sketches of notable Virginians, and genealogical information.

The Hornbook contains bibliographical references and an index.
