= Academy of Music (Lynchburg, Virginia) =

Historic building in Virginia, US

- U.S. National Register of Historic Places
- Virginia Landmarks Register
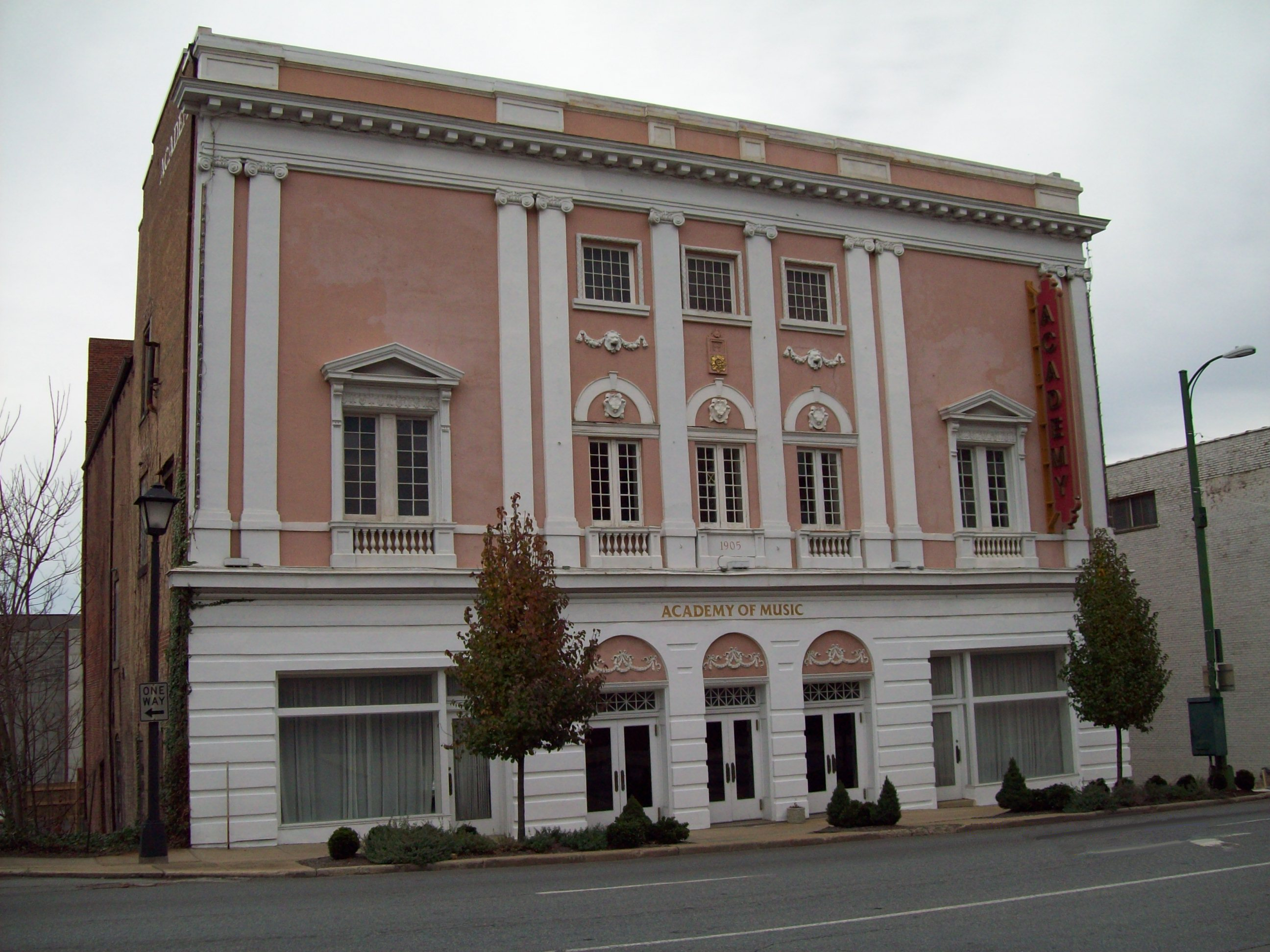
- Academy of Music, Lynchburg VA, November 2008

- Location within Virginia Location within the United States
- Location: 522—526 Main St., Lynchburg, Virginia
- Coordinates: 37°25′1″N 79°8′44″W
- Built: 1904
- Architect: Frye & Chesterman
- Architectural style: Beaux Arts
- NRHP reference No.: 69000340
- VLR No.: 118-0001

Significant dates
- Added to NRHP: June 11, 1969
- Designated VLR: November 5, 1968

The Academy of Music is a historic theatre building located in Lynchburg, Virginia. The three-story theater was built 1904–05 in the Beaux Arts style with a Neoclassical interior. It was designed by Frye & Chesterman. It is one of the only surviving legitimate theaters of the turn-of-the-century period in Virginia. Some of the more notable European and American names to appear on its stage included Ignace Paderewski, Anna Pavlova, Sarah Bernhardt, Alma Gluck, DeWolf Hopper, Otis Skinner, John Drew and Mrs. Patrick Campbell. In 2008, the Lynchburg Academy of Fine Arts received a $245,000 earmark from Representative Bob Goodlatte from the Community Development Fund of the United States Department of Housing and Urban Development, for renovations to the building.

It was listed on the National Register of Historic Places in 1969.
