= John Pendleton Kennedy (librarian) =

First State Librarian of Virginia

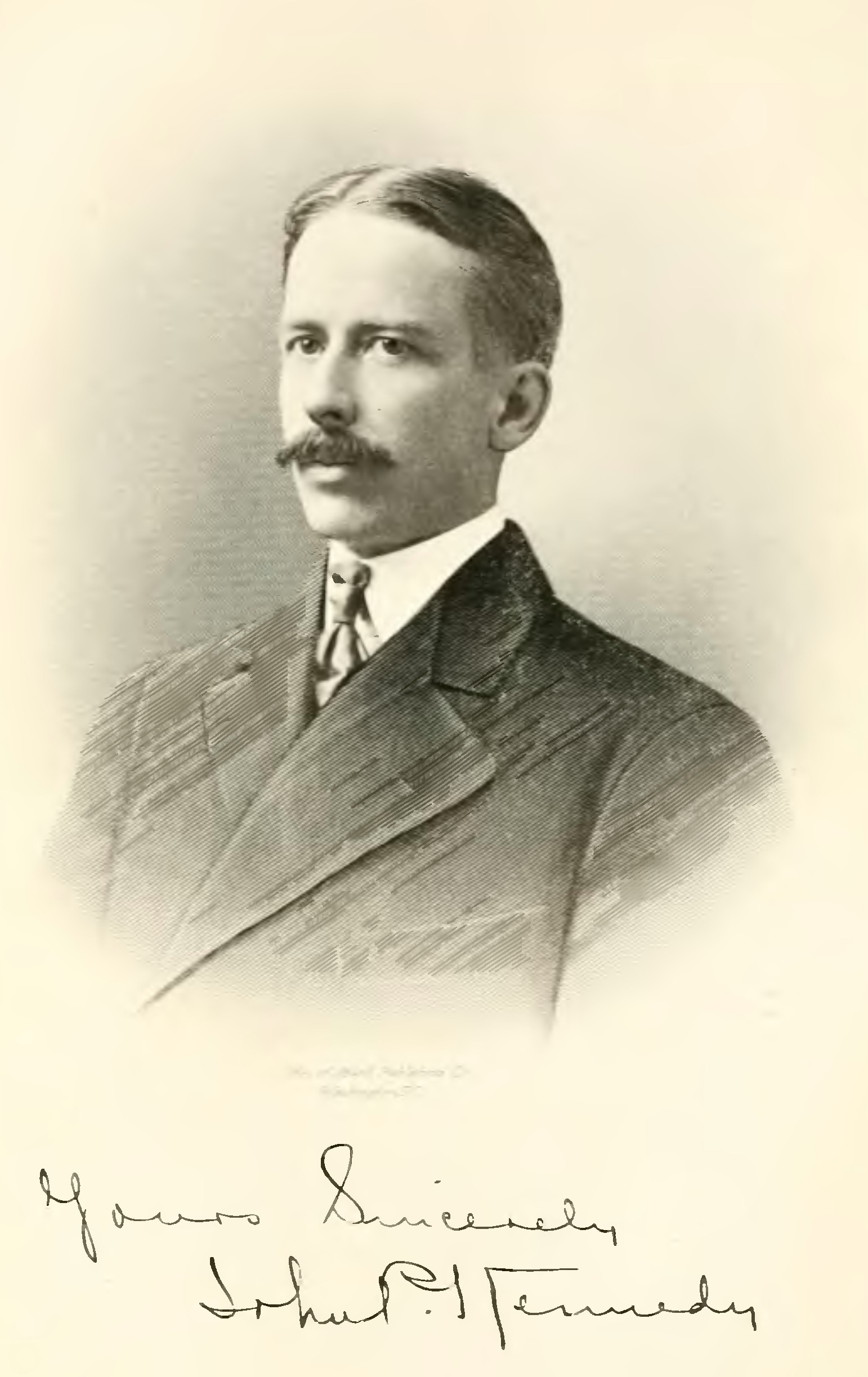
- Born: May 17, 1871; Charlestown, West Virginia
- Died: February 23, 1944 (aged 72); Los Angeles, California
- Occupation: former State Librarian of Virginia

John Pendleton Kennedy (May 17, 1871 - February 23, 1944) was the first state librarian of Virginia. He also served as the first president of the Virginia Library Association, which was organized in the first State Library building in Capitol Square on December 6, 1905.

Kennedy graduated from the German Lutheran school in Wheeling, West Virginia in 1888. After graduation, he spent five years in the Corps of Engineers and in 1895 he went to work as a civil engineer in Wheeling, West Virginia. From 1898 to 1903 he was employed at the Library of Congress. In 1903, he was called to Richmond, Virginia to lead the State Library of Virginia. At the State Library, he introduced the concept of a "traveling library" and established a Department for history and archives. Kennedy was responsible for publishing a number of volumes of historical manuscripts that illuminate the history of the Commonwealth.

== See also ==
- Library science
- Library of Virginia
