= Jones Memorial Library (Lynchburg, Virginia) =

- U.S. National Register of Historic Places
- Virginia Landmarks Register
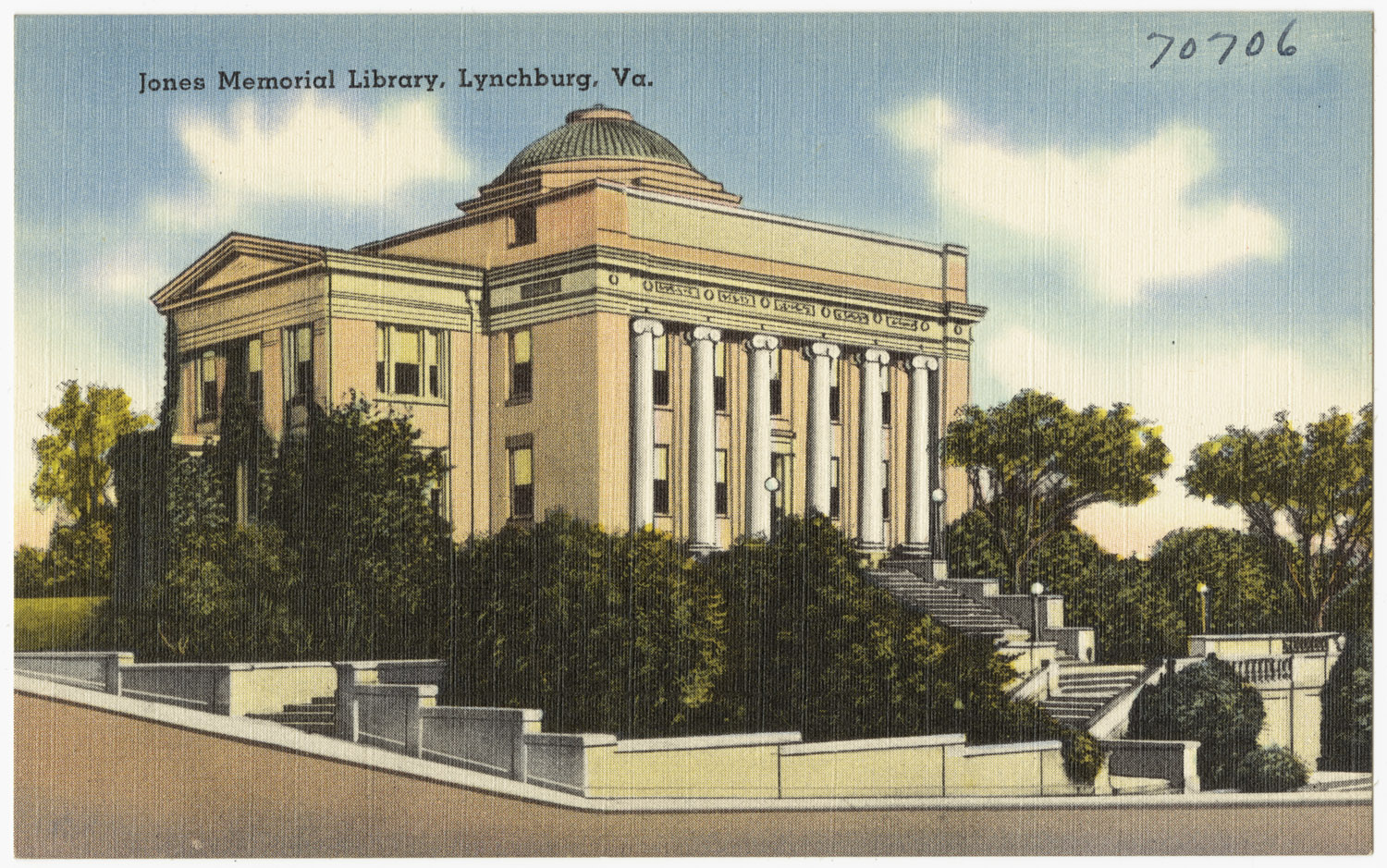
- Postcard view of historic Jones Memorial Library at 434 Rivermont Avenue

- Location within Virginia Location within the United States
- Location: 434 Rivermont Ave., Lynchburg, Virginia
- Coordinates: 37°25′20.33″N 79°8′58.738″W
- Area: 1.8 acres (0.73 ha)
- Built: 1906
- Architect: Frye & Chesterman
- Architectural style: Classical Revival
- NRHP reference No.: 80004311
- VLR No.: 118-0153

Significant dates
- Added to NRHP: October 30, 1980
- Designated VLR: July 31, 1980

The George M. Jones Memorial Library is a specialized genealogy and history research library and archive in Lynchburg, Virginia. It is currently located at 2311 Memorial Avenue, sharing space with the main branch of the Lynchburg Public Library.

The original historic library building is located at 434 Rivermont Avenue in Lynchburg, Virginia. It was designed by the local architectural firm of Frye & Chesterman and was erected in 1906–07 in the Neoclassical style. The original building was listed on the National Register of Historic Places in 1980 and is also listed within the Rivermont Historic District.

The library was founded by Mary Frances Watts Jones in memory of her husband George Morgan Jones; it opened in June 1908 as the second oldest public library in Virginia.

The library had been the dream of George Morgan Jones, philanthropist and industrialist of Lynchburg, but he died before it could be built. As a memorial to her husband, Mary Frances Watts Jones financed the construction and equipping of the library. The deed to establish the library was the direct result of a settlement disputing the terms of George Jones' will, after a lengthy trial ended with a hung jury. In exchange for legal recognition of the couple's adopted daughter, Mary Watts Jones entered into agreement to J. Gordon Payne, Walker Pettyjohn, O. B. Barker. and W. B. Hatcher to donate $50,000 for the purpose of establishing an Association for "The said Library shall be called 'The George M. Jones Memorial Library', and shall be for the free use of the white people of this community without respect to religious or sectarian distinctions, but subject to such reasonable restrictions and limitations as the governing body of the Association shall prescribe."

During the Jim Crow era, Jones Memorial Library operated segregated public library services. In 1924, under the leadership of Jane Maud Campbell, the library opened the Dunbar Branch at the former Paul Laurence Dunbar High School. The Dunbar Branch served black residents in the city; Anne Spencer was the branch's first permanent librarian.

In 1966, the Lynchburg Public Library opened as the first taxpayer funded, racially integrated public library in the city. Jones Memorial Library then donated its fiction collection to the Lynchburg Public Library and the Lynchburg City Schools, becoming an integrated specialized research library.

In 1987, Jones Memorial Library sold the Rivermont Avenue property and moved its services to 2311 Memorial Avenue in a shared building with the Lynchburg Public Library.

The Jones Memorial Library collection in genealogy and central Virginia is one of the largest in the state. Although the library's primary focus is on the central Virginia area, collections include a wide variety of materials covering the State of Virginia as well as the surrounding states, including county histories and court records, family histories and genealogies, general works on the Civil War, county land tax and personal property tax records, and census records.

The library is located at 2311 Memorial Avenue on the second floor above the Lynchburg Public Library's main branch. The library is open Tuesday-Saturday for genealogical and archival research.
