= Oliver Hill Building =

- Virginia State Library-Oliver Hill Building
- U.S. National Register of Historic Places
- Virginia Landmarks Register
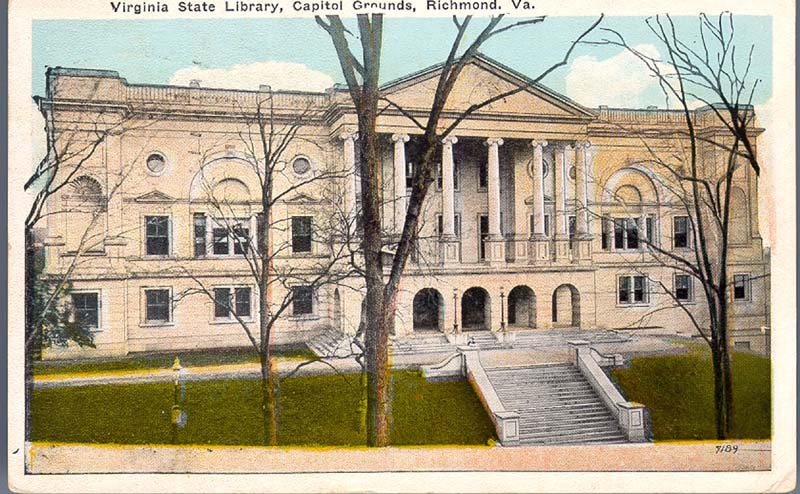
- Virginia State Library-Oliver Hill Building, c. 1928

- Location within Virginia Location within the United States
- Location: 102 Governor St., Richmond, Virginia
- Coordinates: 37°32′16″N 77°25′36″W
- Area: 2 acres (0.81 ha)
- Built: 1892-1894, 1908-1910, 1929
- Architect: Poindexter, William Munday; Dimmock, Marion Johnson
- Architectural style: Beaux Arts
- NRHP reference No.: 08000542
- VLR No.: 127-6048

Significant dates
- Added to NRHP: June 20, 2008
- Designated VLR: June 8, 2006

Virginia State Library-Oliver Hill Building, also known as the State Finance Building, is a historic library and government office building located on Capitol Square in Richmond, Virginia. It was built in 1892–1894, expanded in 1908–1910, remodeled in 1929, and renovated and expanded in 2004. It is a three-story, Beaux Arts style building with a buff brick veneer and terra cotta detailing. It features an Ionic order portico echoing the Virginia State Capitol’s portico. It originally housed the Virginia State Library collections, the Virginia Supreme Court, and office of the Attorney General. From 1910 to 1964, the State Museum of Natural History was housed in a new wing. In 1939, the functions of the State Library and Supreme Court were moved to the new Virginia State Library building, now the Patrick Henry Building, and the building was rechristened the State Finance Building. On October 28, 2005, the building was officially renamed the Oliver Hill Building, after Oliver Hill.

The offices of the Lieutenant Governor of Virginia and the Virginia Department of Agriculture and Consumer Services are located in the Oliver Hill Building. It was listed on the National Register of Historic Places in 2008.
