= Frye & Chesterman =

American architectural firm formed in 1900

Frye and Chesterman was an American architectural firm formed in 1900 by partners Edward Graham Frye (1870–1942) and Aubrey Chesterman (1874–1937) with offices in Lynchburg, Virginia. In 1913 the firm moved to Roanoke, Virginia.

Edward Frye had an established architectural practice in Lynchburg in the 1890s. Aubrey Chesterman was born in Richmond, Virginia, on June 7, 1875. After completing his basic education in Richmond, he studied architecture for five years under Captain M. J. Dimmock, and he worked for Noland and Baskervill in Richmond. His son Aubrey Warren Chesterman (d. 1957) was a prominent architect in Long Island, New York.

== Frye works ==
- Jones House, 456 Rivermont, Lynchburg, Virginia, Queen Anne style
- Residence, 465 Rivermont, Lynchburg, Virginia (1894), Queen Anne style
- Residence, 471 Rivermont, Lynchburg, Virginia (1894), Queen Anne style
- R. Taylor Gleaves House, 1700 Rivermont Avenue, Lynchburg, Virginia, Queen Anne style
- Carriage House, 525 Luke Mountain Rd, Covington, VA (1930)

== Chesterman works ==
- William A. Graves House, 2102 Rivermont Avenue, Lynchburg, Virginia (1901), Georgian Revival style

== Frye & Chesterman works ==
- Aviary, Lynchburg, Virginia (1902), NRHP 80004309
- Piedmont Club, Lynchburg, Virginia (1902)
- Penn "Wedding Cake House", 1020 Main Street, Danbury, Virginia (1902)
- Farmers and Merchants Bank Building, 106 North Loudoun Street, Winchester, Virginia (c1902), Renaissance Revival style
- Academy of Music, Lynchburg, Virginia (1904), Beaux Arts style, Neoclassical interior, NRHP 69000340
- Carpenter & Boxley Office Building, 507 East Main Street, Clifton Forge, Virginia (1904) (demolished)
- Fire Station, 1210 Rivermont Avenue, Lynchburg, Virginia (1904), classical revival style
- Norfolk & Western Railway Station, Roanoke, Virginia (1904)
- Alleghany Building, 505-511 East Ridgeway Street, Clifton Forge, Virginia (1905)
- Masonic Theater, 510 Main Street, Clifton Forge, Virginia (1905)
- Jones Memorial Library, 434 Rivermont Avenue, Lynchbug, Virginia (1906), NRHP 80004311
- State Capitol Building wings, Richmond, Virginia (1906, associated architects)
- Krise Building, 827 Main Street, Lynchburg, Virginia (1906)
- Charles L. Cocke Memorial Building, Hollins Institute, Hollins, Virginia (1908)
- Gymnasium, Randolph-Macon Woman's College, Lynchburg, Virginia (1909)
- Thurman & Boone Building, Jefferson Street at Church Avenue, Roanoke, Virginia (1914)
- Municipal Building, 216 Campbell Avenue, S. W., Roanoke, Virginia (1915), NRHP 02000978
- City Market Building, Roanoke, Virginia (1922)
- buildings at the Virginia Military Institute, Lexington, Virginia
- Norfolk & Western Railway Company general office, Roanoke, Virginia
- depots for the Norfolk & Western Railway
- Young Men's Christian Association building, Williamson, West Virginia

== Gallery ==
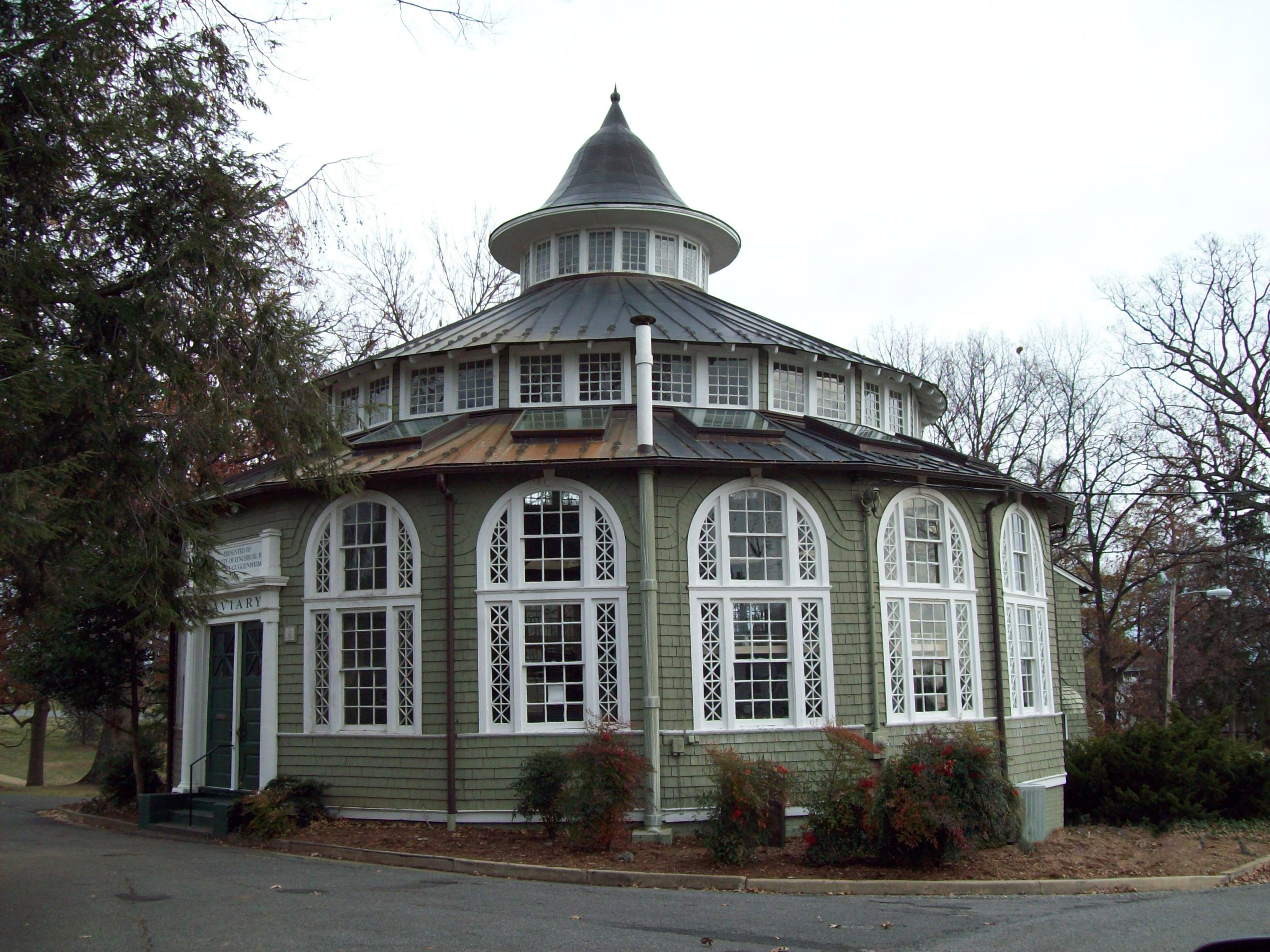
Aviary, Lynchburg

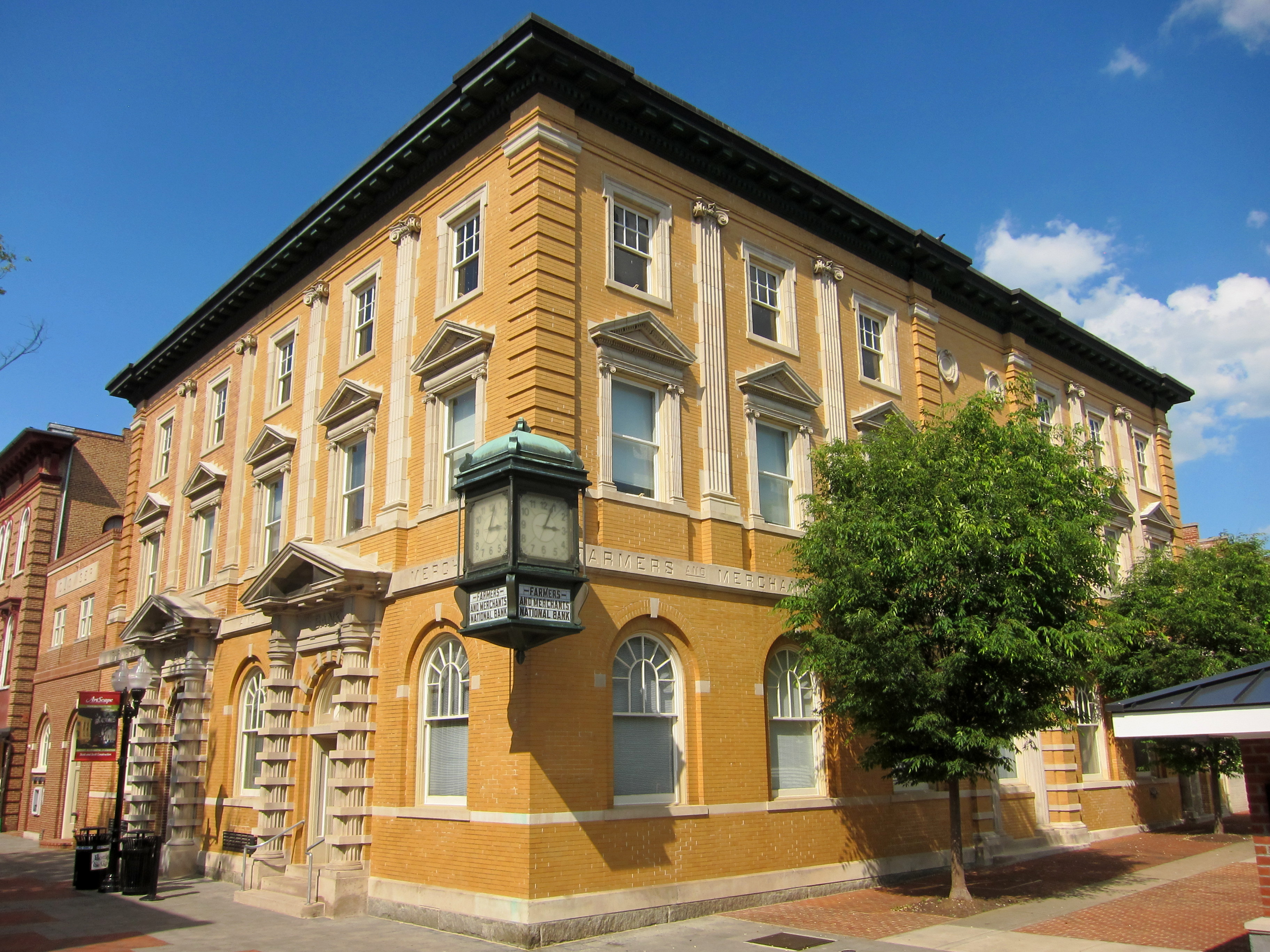
Farmers and Merchants Bank Building, Winchester

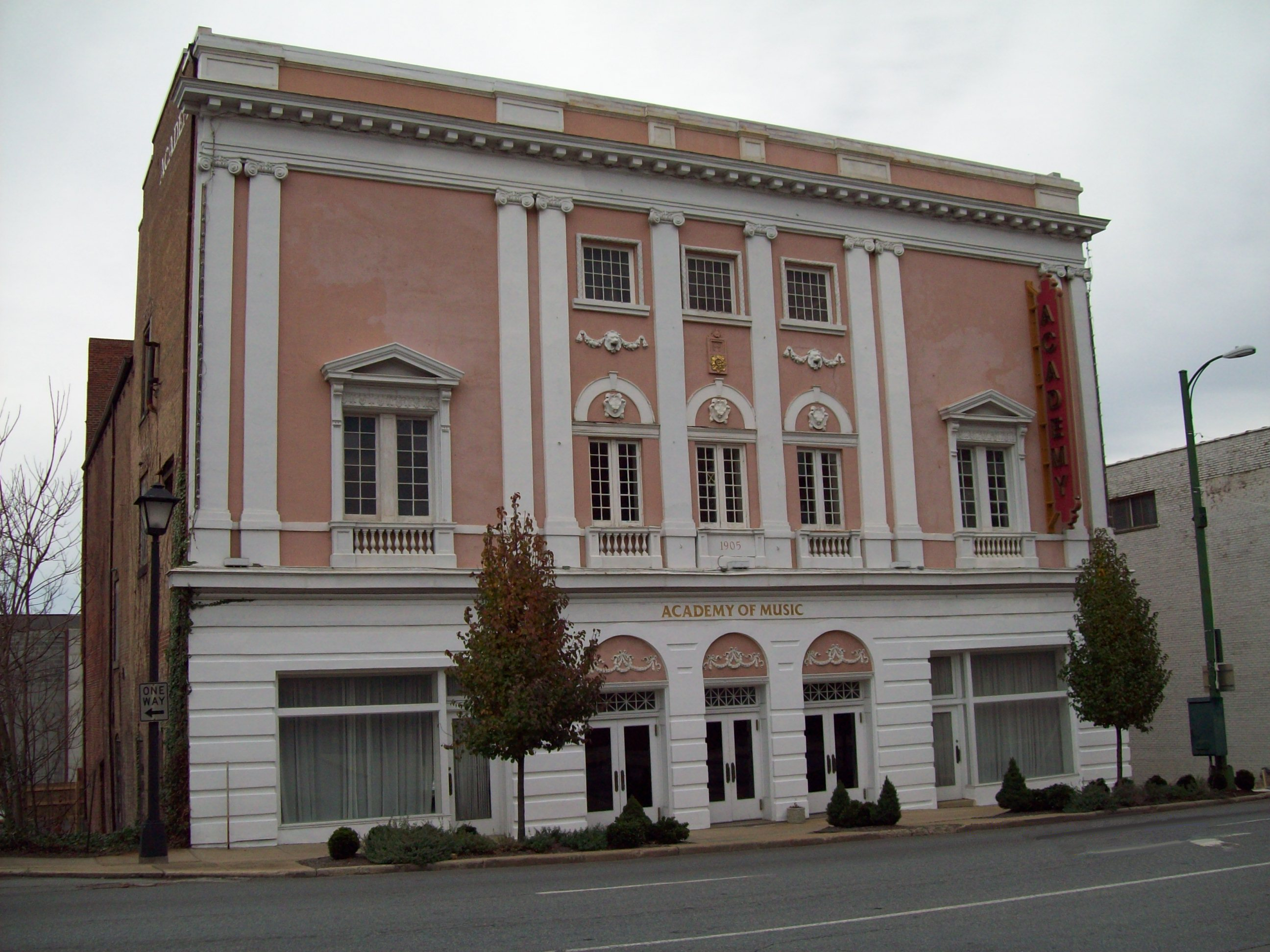
Academy of Music, Lynchburg

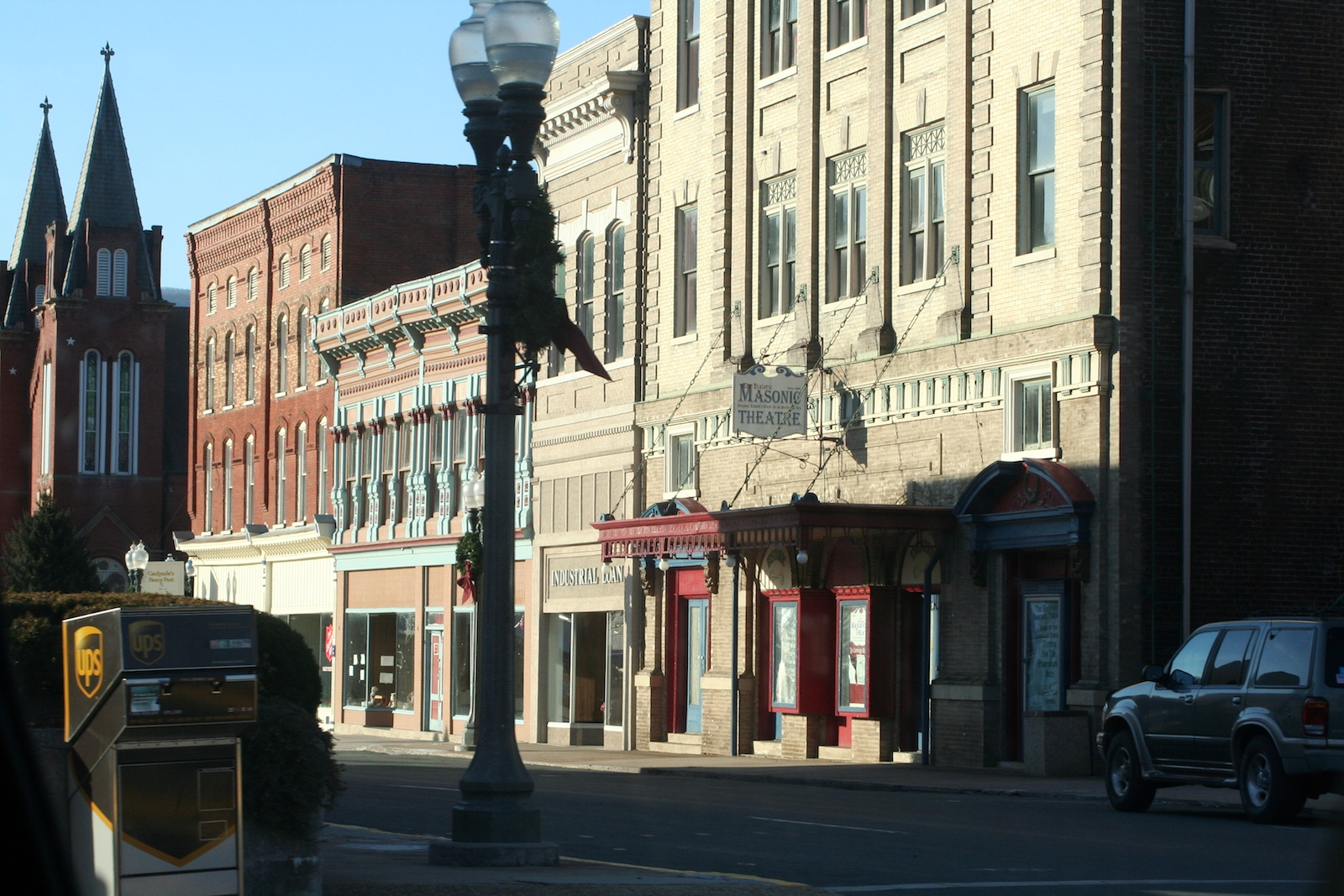
Masonic Theater, Clifton Forge

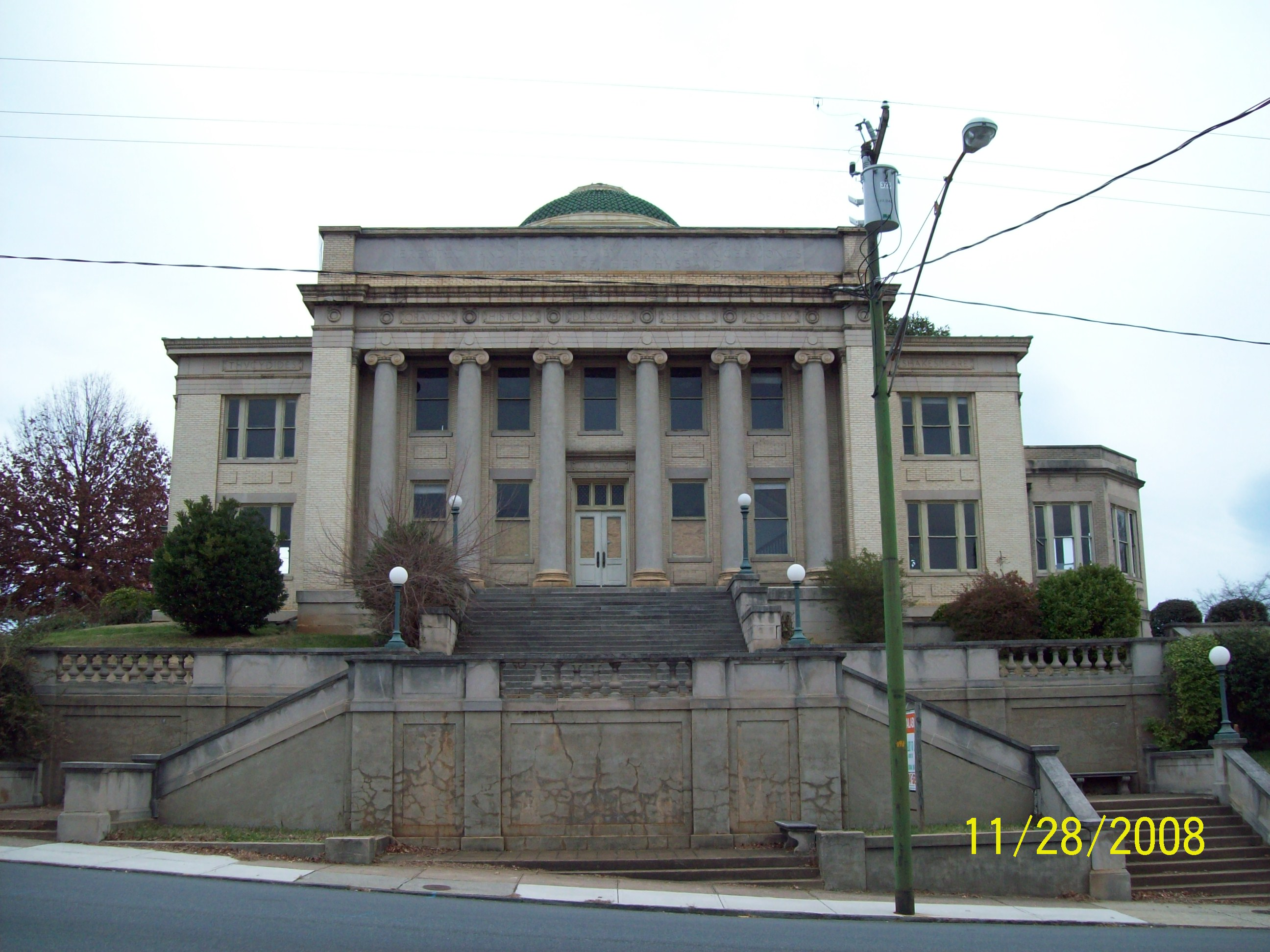
Jones Memorial Library, Lynchburg

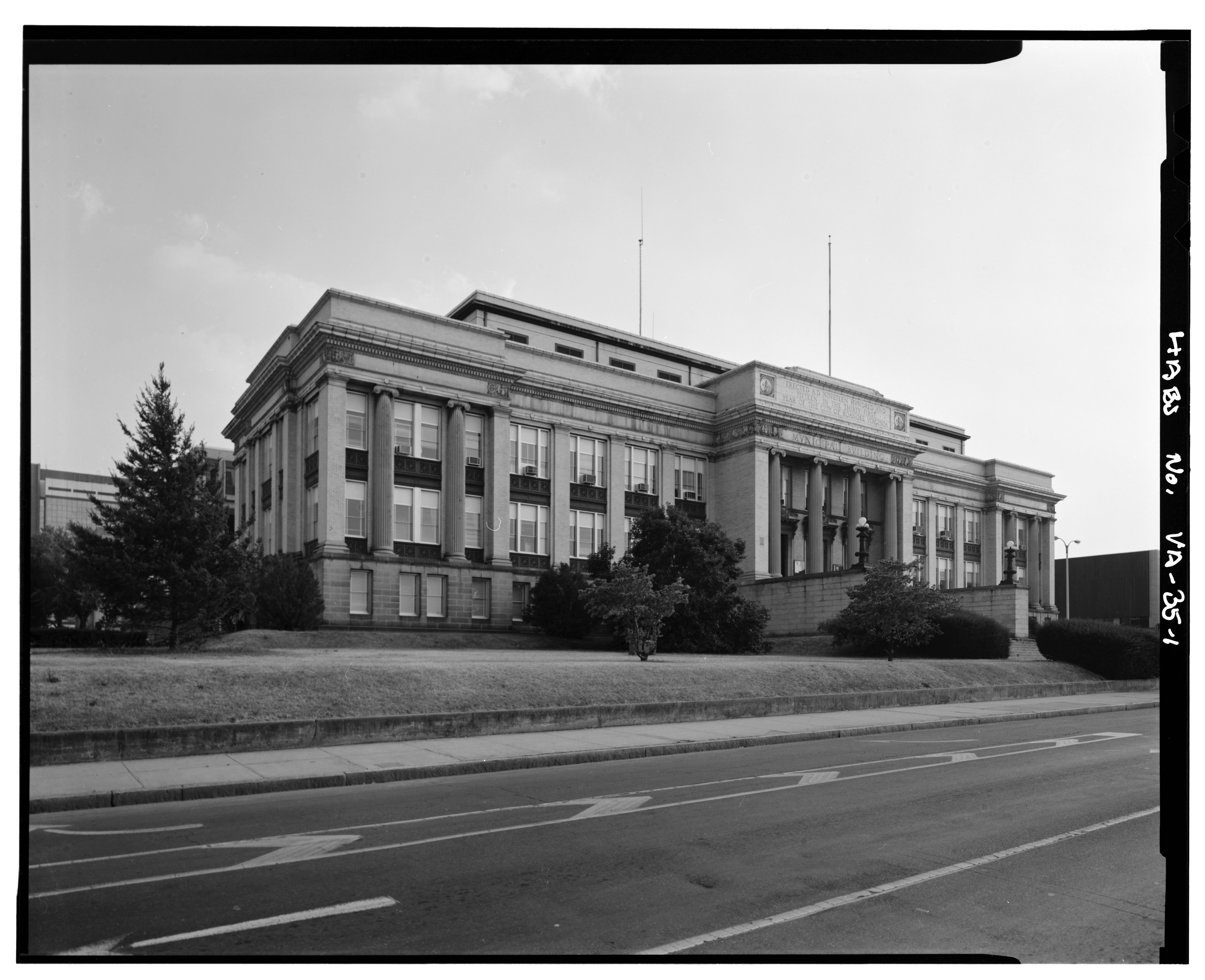
Municipal Building, Roanoke

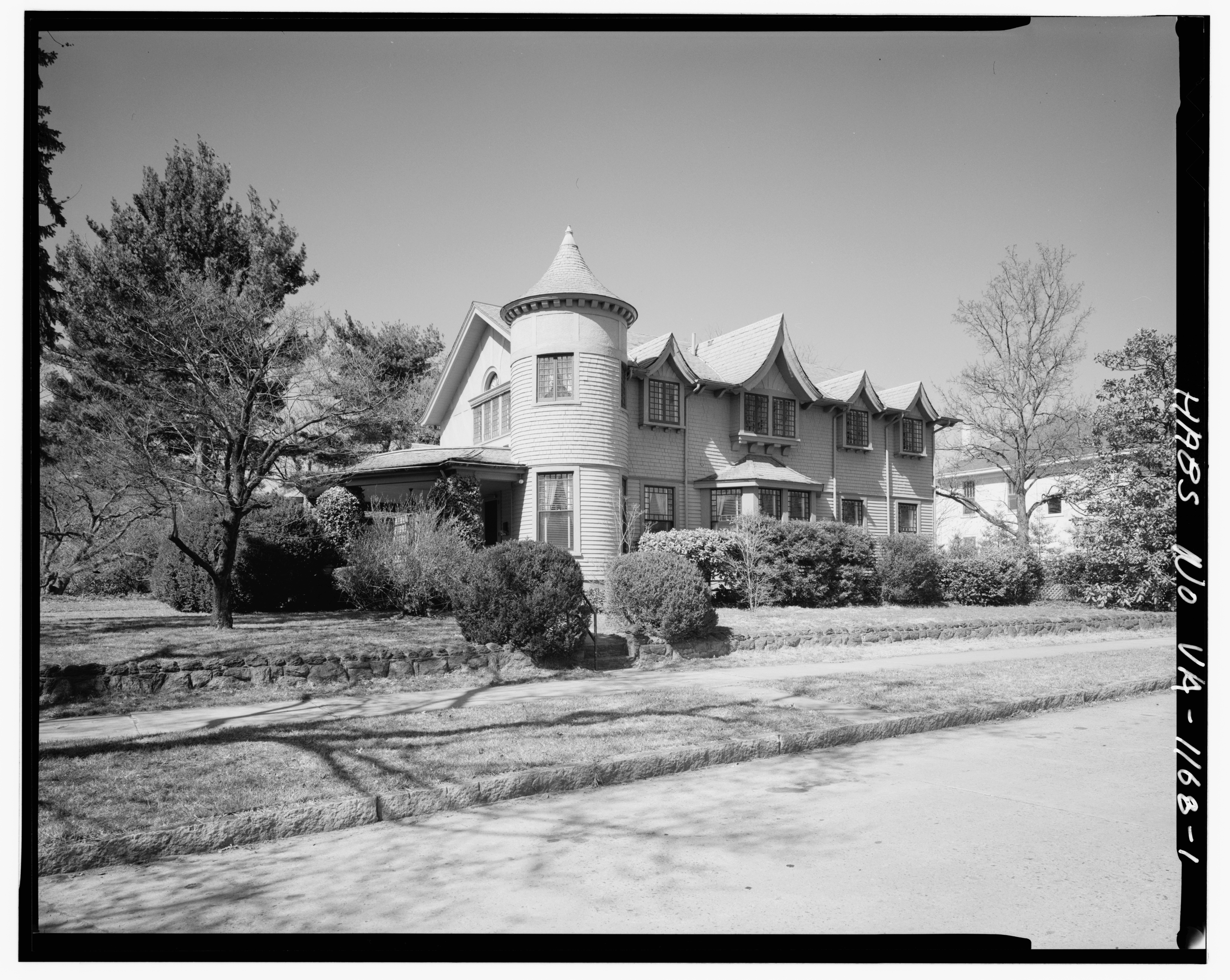
Gleaves House, Lynchburg

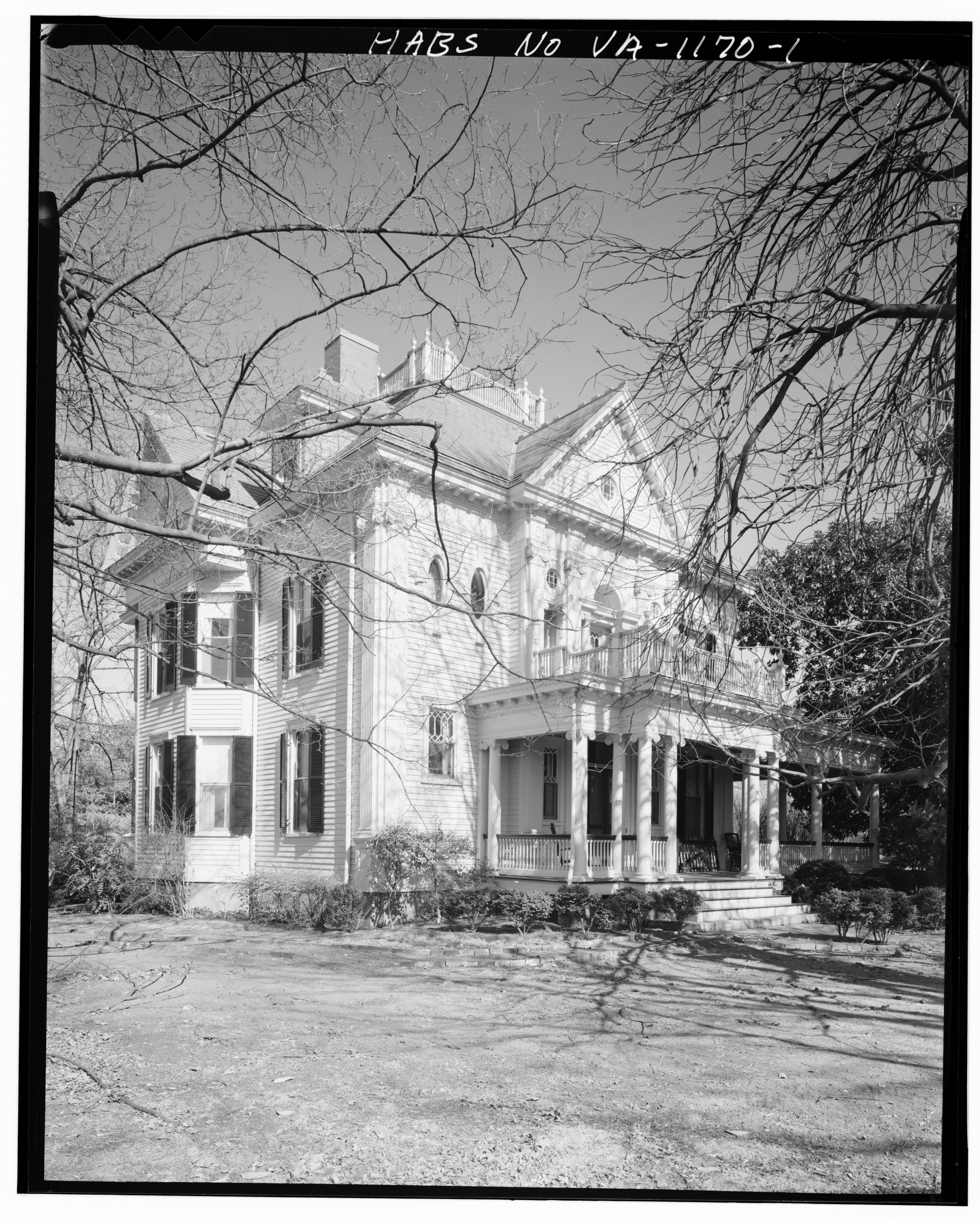
Graves House, Lynchburg
