= Henry Read McIlwaine =

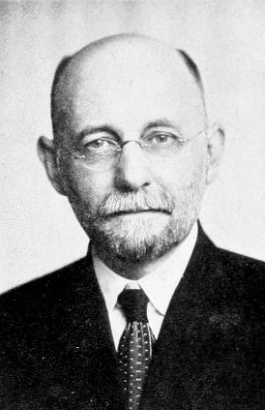
- Born: July 12, 1864; Farmville, Virginia
- Died: March 16, 1934 (aged 69); Richmond, Virginia
- Education: Hampden-Sydney College; Johns Hopkins University
- Occupation: State Librarian of Virginia

Henry Read McIlwaine (1864–1934) was an American editor and librarian. He served as the third State Librarian for the Commonwealth of Virginia.

== Biography ==
Henry Read McIlwaine was born in Farmville, Virginia on July 12, 1864.

McIlwaine graduated from Hampden-Sydney College in 1885 and earned a Ph.D. from Johns Hopkins University in 1893. He returned to Hampden–Sydney in 1893 to serve as professor of English and history until 1907, when he was appointed State Librarian for Virginia, a position he held until his death in Richmond on March 16, 1934.

He was a prolific editor of historical volumes relating to the early governance of the Commonwealth including:

- Executive Journals of the Council of Colonial Virginia
- Journals of the House of Burgesses of Virginia
- Legislative journals of the Council of colonial Virginia
- Official letters of the governors of the State of Virginia
- The struggle of Protestant dissenters for religious toleration in Virginia

== See also ==
- Library science
- Library of Virginia
