= Library of Virginia =

State library in Richmond, Virginia, US

Coordinates: 37°32′29″N 77°26′2″W

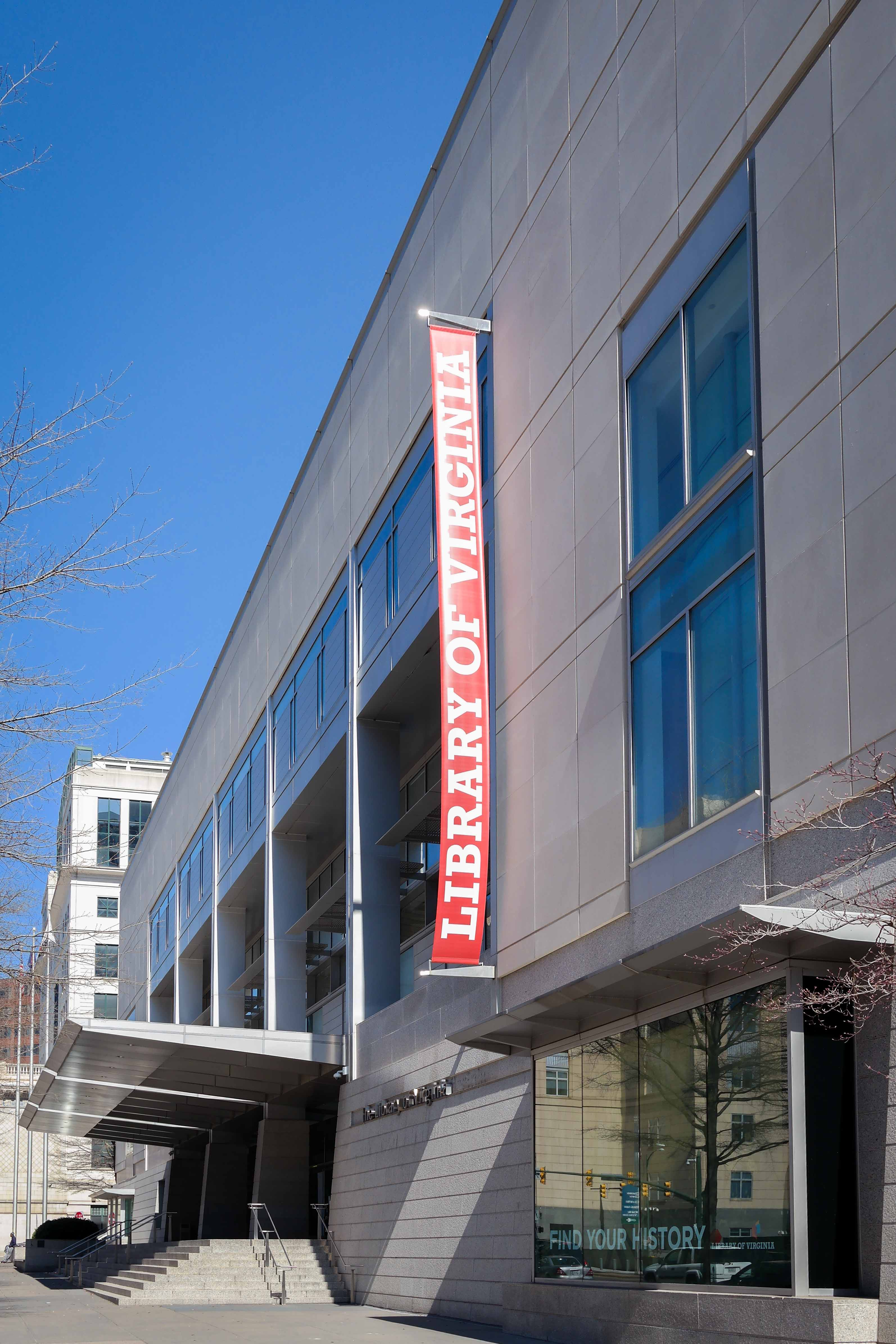
- The Library of Virginia at its current location
- Location: 800 East Broad Street, Richmond, Virginia, United States, 23219
- Type: Government of Virginia
- Established: January 23, 1823; 203 years ago

Collection
- Size: 2.3 million books, periodicals, newspapers, and government documents 60 million digital records 82,000 cubic feet of manuscripts; 279,000 indexed chancery cases

Other information
- Director: Dennis T. Clark (as of January 25, 2024)
- Website: www.lva.virginia.gov

The Library of Virginia in Richmond, Virginia, is the library agency of the Commonwealth of Virginia. It serves as the archival agency and the reference library for Virginia's seat of government. The library is located at 800 East Broad Street, two blocks from the Virginia State Capitol building. It was formerly known as the Virginia State Library and as the Virginia State Library and Archives.

Formally founded by the Virginia General Assembly in 1823, the Library of Virginia organizes, cares for, and manages the state's collection of books and official records, many of which date back to the early colonial period. It houses what is believed to be the most comprehensive collection of materials on Virginia history, government and people available anywhere.

== History ==
Although the Library of Virginia was officially established January 23, 1823, its history goes back to the collection of materials acquired for official use by the colonial Council and subsequent colonial and state authorities. The first permanent home of the library was a small room on the top floor of the State Capitol. The state's books and records eventually outgrew this space, and overflow books and documents were then stored in several rented locations across Richmond.

In an 1851 survey by the Smithsonian, the library was listed as having 14,000 volumes.

In 1892, the General Assembly provided for a new Virginia State Library on Capitol Square in what is today known as the Oliver Hill Building. Over the ensuing forty years, the library again outgrew that building, and in 1940 it moved to its third location at the edge of Capitol Square between 11th and Governor Streets (today the Patrick Henry Executive Office Building). It shared this space with the State Law Library, the Virginia Supreme Court of Appeals, the Virginia Department of Law, and the Office of the Attorney General.

The library moved to its current location at 800 East Broad Street in 1997. The old library buildings were listed on the National Register of Historic Places in 2008 and 2005, respectively. In addition to the main library building, the library manages the State Records Center in Henrico County where inactive, non-permanent records of state agencies and local governments are housed.

The library also supplies research and reference assistance to state officials; consulting services and training to state and local government agencies and to Virginia's public libraries; administers numerous federal, state, and local grant programs; provides educational programs and resources on Virginia history; and offers exhibitions, lectures, and book-signings.

== Collections ==
The Library of Virginia houses one of the most comprehensive collections on Virginia, focusing on the varied past of the Commonwealth and documenting the lives of important and ordinary Virginians and their stories. The collections hold government records, private papers, manuscripts, rare books, maps, photographs, ephemera and more, including millions of digital records.

The library’s online resources include Virginia Memory, which provides access to many of its digital collections; Virginia Chronicle, a newspaper database; Virginia Untold: The African American Narrative, a database of records related to enslaved and free Black and multiracial people who lived in Virginia from the establishment of slavery in the 1600s until the 1860s; Virginia Changemakers, a biography series; Document Bank of Virginia, a collection of primary historical sources for use in classrooms; and The Dictionary of Virginia Biography, an ongoing biographical reference project.

As of 2024, the library’s collections contained more than 134 million items in total. This includes more than 121 million state, local, and federal government records; more than 9 million personal papers; more than 1.5 million items in the General Book Collection; 809,986 microforms; 578,589 items in the Visual Studies Collection; 54,892 maps; 53,024 rare books; 4,906 items in the DVD/VHS/audio collection; and 573 items in the State Art Collection.

== Exhibitions and programs ==
The Library of Virginia organizes regular exhibitions and programs that cover Virginia's social and cultural history and encourage use of the collections and services. These exhibitions, which include traveling and virtual exhibitions, are frequently accompanied by related lectures, discussions, book talks and other events intended to expand on the exhibition themes. Examples of such offerings include the LVA On the Go van, which serves a function similar to a bookmobile in that it allows staff to share library resources with populations that may have otherwise been unable to easily access their services.

=== Programs and services ===
The library regularly hosts author talks and book signings, lectures, panel discussions, film screenings, book group meetings, art displays, workshops and other events related to Virginia’s history, government and people. Most events are free. A noon book talk series features nonfiction works, while the Carole Weinstein Author Series focuses on Virginia authors and Virginia subjects across all genres. Quarterly First Fridays at LVA events feature works by Virginia artists and hands-on creative activities for visitors. A genealogy workshop series helps attendees learn how to research their family history.

The library’s Making History with LVA volunteer program invites participants to help make historical documents more searchable and usable for researchers through transcription, indexing and text correction. Volunteers can work online on their own or join monthly in-person or virtual sessions led by library staff members.

The library also participates in Archives Month in Virginia, which focuses on institutions and individuals that have made significant impact on the preservation and accessibility of historical records. It produces an annual Archives Month in Virginia poster commemorating archival and special collections repositories throughout the state and hosts related events.

=== Awards and recognition ===
Since its founding the Library of Virginia has sponsored or otherwise presented several awards, honors, and recognitions to people and institutions that have made visible contributions to Virginia history and culture. Past awards include Virginia Women in History and an annual lifetime achievement award. Recipients of the latter have included Ellen Glasgow (1998), Edgar Allan Poe (1999), Tom Wolfe (2007), Barbara Kingsolver (2014), Jan Karon (2015), and David Baldacci (2017).

Current awards include the annual Virginia Literary Awards, which recognizes outstanding Virginia authors and books about Virginia in the areas of fiction, nonfiction, poetry and, since 2024, children’s literature. The Library of Virginia also partners with the Virginia Museum of Fine Arts to annually present the Mary Lynn Kotz Award, which is granted a book that is "written primarily in response to a work (or works) of art while also showing the highest literary quality as a creative or scholarly work on its own merit." The Honorary Patron of Letters Degree is a yearly honor that recognizes "individuals who have made outstanding contributions in the realm of history, or library or archival science."

Other awards granted by the institution includes Strong Men & Women in Virginia History, which annually recognizes Black Virginians who have made important contributions to the state, the nation, or their professions. The program also includes a creative writing contest for high school students.

== Virginia state librarians ==
During the nineteenth century, the Secretary of the Commonwealth of Virginia usually oversaw the state library as part of their official duties. This included:

- John Pendleton Kennedy, 1903–1907
- Henry Read McIlwaine, 1907–1934
- Wilmer L. Hall, 1934–1946
- Randolph Warner Church, 1947–1972
- Donald Rucker Haynes, 1972–1986
- Ella Gaines Yates, 1986–1990
- John C. Tyson, 1990–1994
- Nolan T. Yelitch, 1995–2007
- Sandra Gioia Treadway, 2007–2024
- Dennis T. Clark, 2024-current

== See also ==
- List of libraries in the United States
- List of U.S. state libraries and archives
