= Aviary (Lynchburg, Virginia) =

- U.S. National Register of Historic Places
- Virginia Landmarks Register
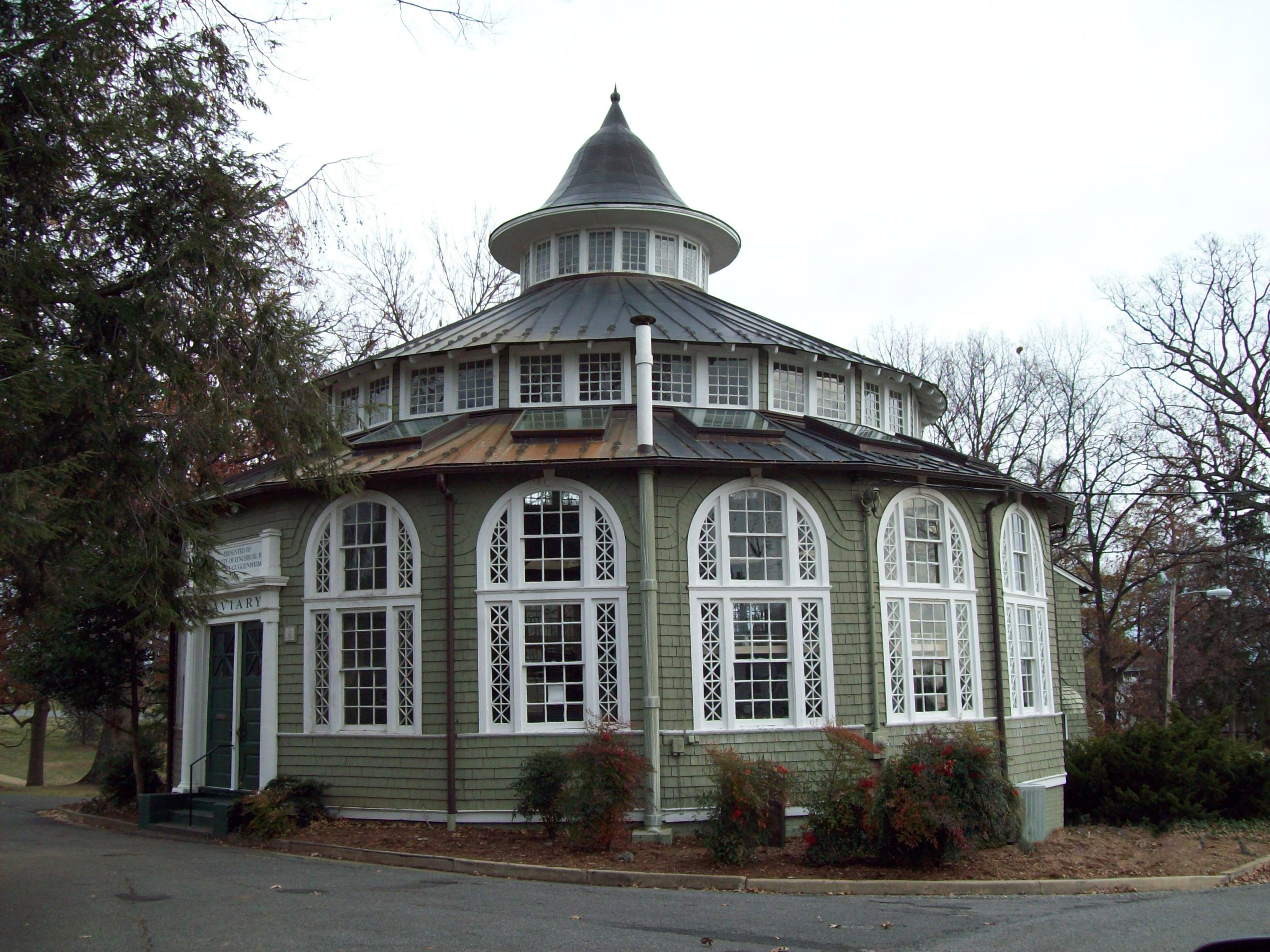
- Aviary, Lynchburg VA, November 2008

- Location within Virginia Location within the United States
- Location: 402 Grove St., Lynchburg, Virginia
- Coordinates: 37°24′8″N 79°9′47″W
- Area: 1 acre (0.40 ha)
- Built: 1902
- Architect: Frye & Chesterman
- Architectural style: Queen Anne
- NRHP reference No.: 80004309
- VLR No.: 118-0155

Significant dates
- Added to NRHP: July 30, 1980
- Designated VLR: April 15, 1980

The Aviary is a historic aviary building located in Miller Park at Lynchburg, Virginia. It is a Queen Anne-style structure erected in 1902. The multi-sided exhibition house was designed by the local architectural firm of Frye & Chesterman. The building was a gift to the city of Lynchburg from Randolph Guggenheimer, born at Lynchburg, later of New York City. When completed, the Aviary housed, "Seven cages containing monkeys, one with at least a half dozen healthy alligators, one with cockatoos, one with Australian doves, one with parrots and one with canaries." It later became a branch library and an office structure for the city Department of Parks and Recreation.

It was listed on the National Register of Historic Places in 1980.
