= Virginia State Capitol =

State capitol building of Virginia, U.S.

- U.S. National Register of Historic Places
- U.S. National Historic Landmark
- Virginia Landmarks Register
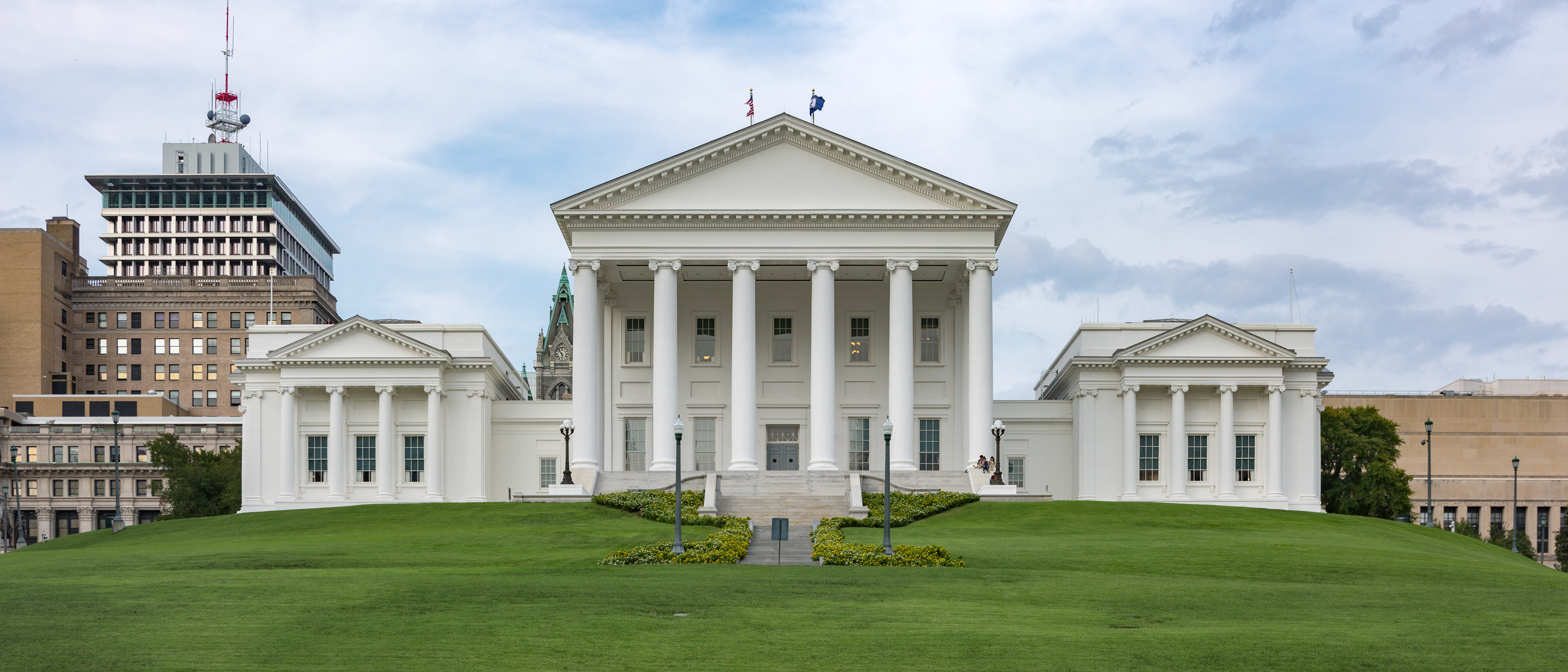
- The Virginia State Capitol Building in Richmond in August 2017
- Interactive map of Virginia State Capitol
- Location: 1000 Bank St, Richmond, Virginia, U.S.
- Coordinates: 37.538758°N 77.433594°W
- Built: 1785–1788
- Architects: Thomas Jefferson; Charles-Louis Clérisseau
- Architectural style: Early Republic, Palladian
- NRHP reference No.: 66000911
- VLR No.: 127-0002

Significant dates
- Added to NRHP: October 15, 1966
- Designated NHL: December 19, 1960
- Designated VLR: November 5, 1968

The Virginia State Capitol is the seat of state government of the Commonwealth of Virginia, located in Richmond, the state capital. It houses the oldest elected legislative body in North America, the Virginia General Assembly, first established as the House of Burgesses in 1619.

The Capitol was conceived of by Thomas Jefferson and Charles-Louis Clérisseau in France, based on the Maison Carrée in Nîmes. Construction began in 1785 and was completed in 1788. The current Capitol is the eighth built to serve as Virginia's statehouse, primarily due to fires during the American colonial period. The building also served as the capitol of the Confederate States of America during the American Civil War from 1861 to 1865. In the early 20th century, two wings were added, leading to its present appearance. In 1960, it was designated a National Historic Landmark.

== History ==
=== Colonial precursors in Jamestown and Williamsburg ===
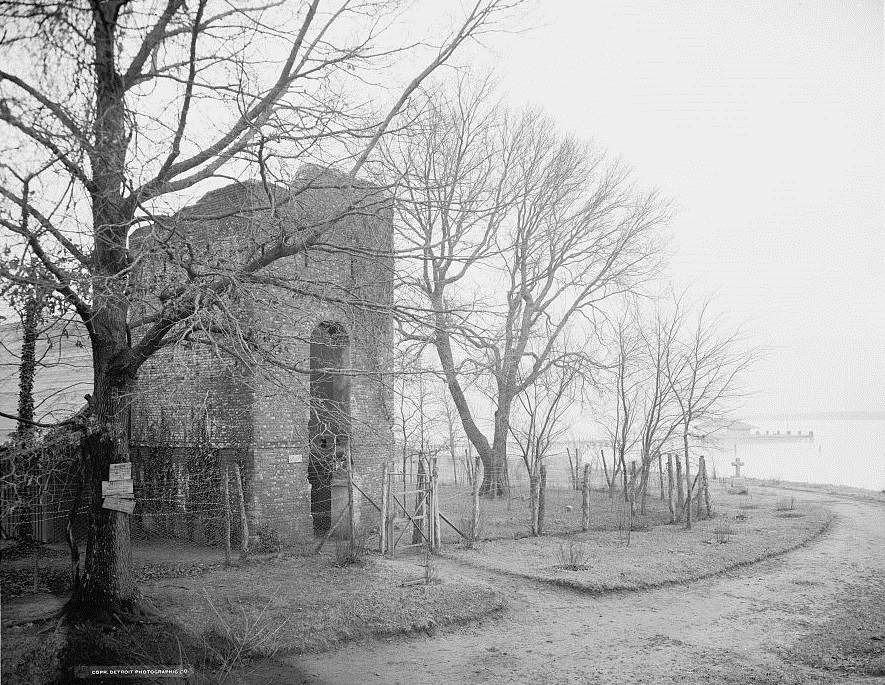
Remains of the 1639 tower of the old church, photographed c. 1900

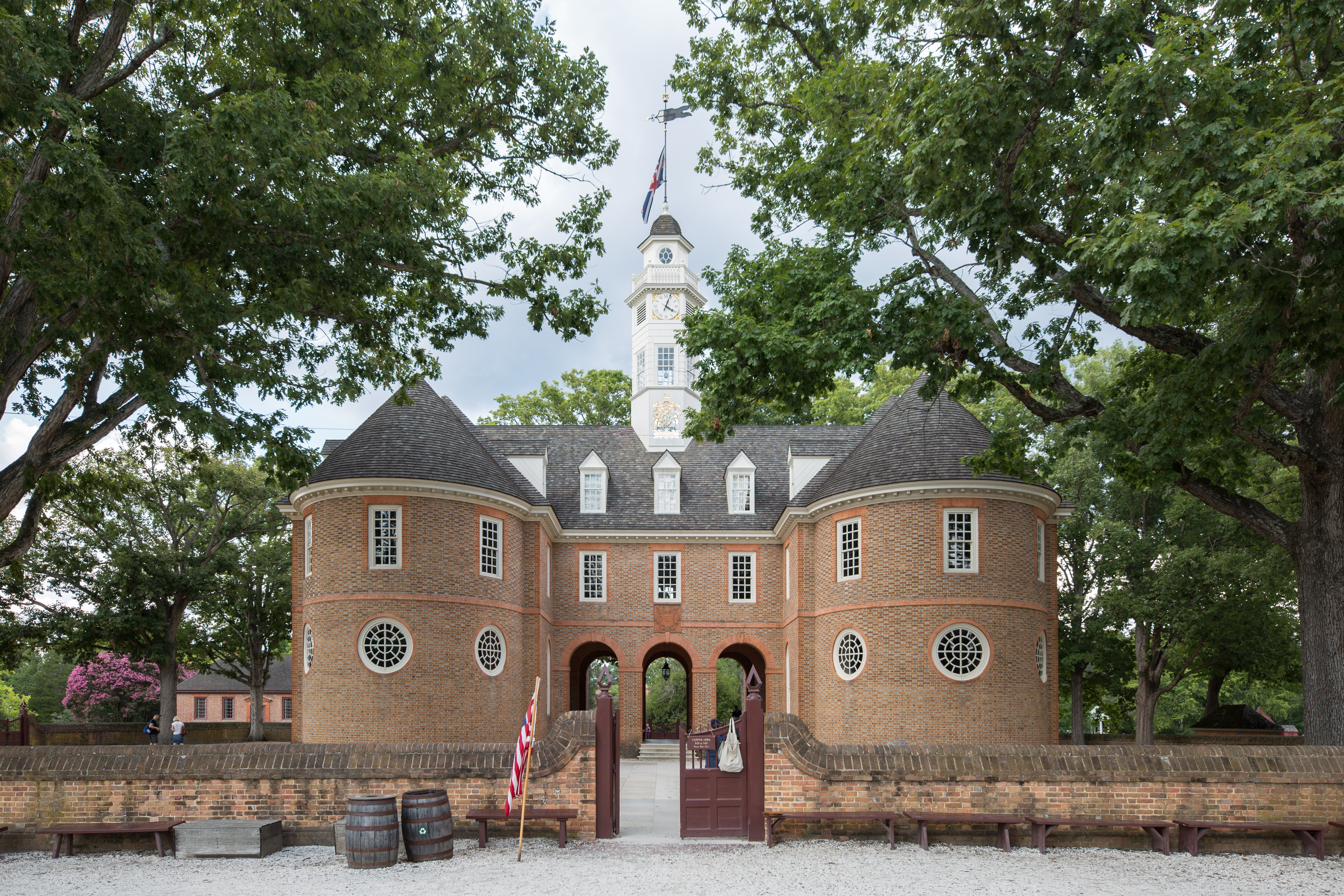
Reconstruction of the first state capitol in Williamsburg

During the American colonial era, the Colony of Virginia's first capital was Jamestown, where the first legislative body, the Virginia House of Burgesses, met in 1619. The new government used four state houses at different times at Jamestown due to fires. The first Representative Legislative Assembly convened on July 30, 1619 at the Jamestown Church which served as the first Capitol.

With the decision to relocate the government inland to Williamsburg in 1699, a grand new Capitol building was completed in November 1705. Nearby was the grand Governor's Palace. It burned in 1747 and was replaced in 1753. On June 29, 1776, Virginians declared their independence from Great Britain and wrote the state's first constitution, thereby creating an independent government five days before Congress voted for the Declaration of Independence in Philadelphia on July 4.

The Capitol at Williamsburg served until the American Revolutionary War began, when Governor Thomas Jefferson urged that the capital be relocated to Richmond. The building was last used as a capitol on December 24, 1779, when the Virginia General Assembly adjourned to reconvene in 1780 at the new capital, Richmond. It was eventually destroyed.

=== Richmond and state capitol design ===
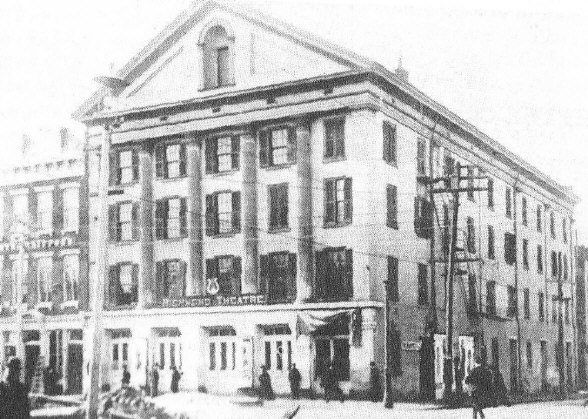
"Old Capitol" where the Ratifying Convention met

When it convened in Richmond on May 1, 1780, the legislature met in a makeshift building near Shockoe Bottom. By 1788, the "Old Capitol" where the Virginia Ratifying Convention met was at the New Academy by the Chevalier Quesnay.

Plans were begun for a new building to serve a new state, the Commonwealth of Virginia. The site selected for a new, permanent building was on Shockoe Hill, a major hill overlooking the falls of the James River.

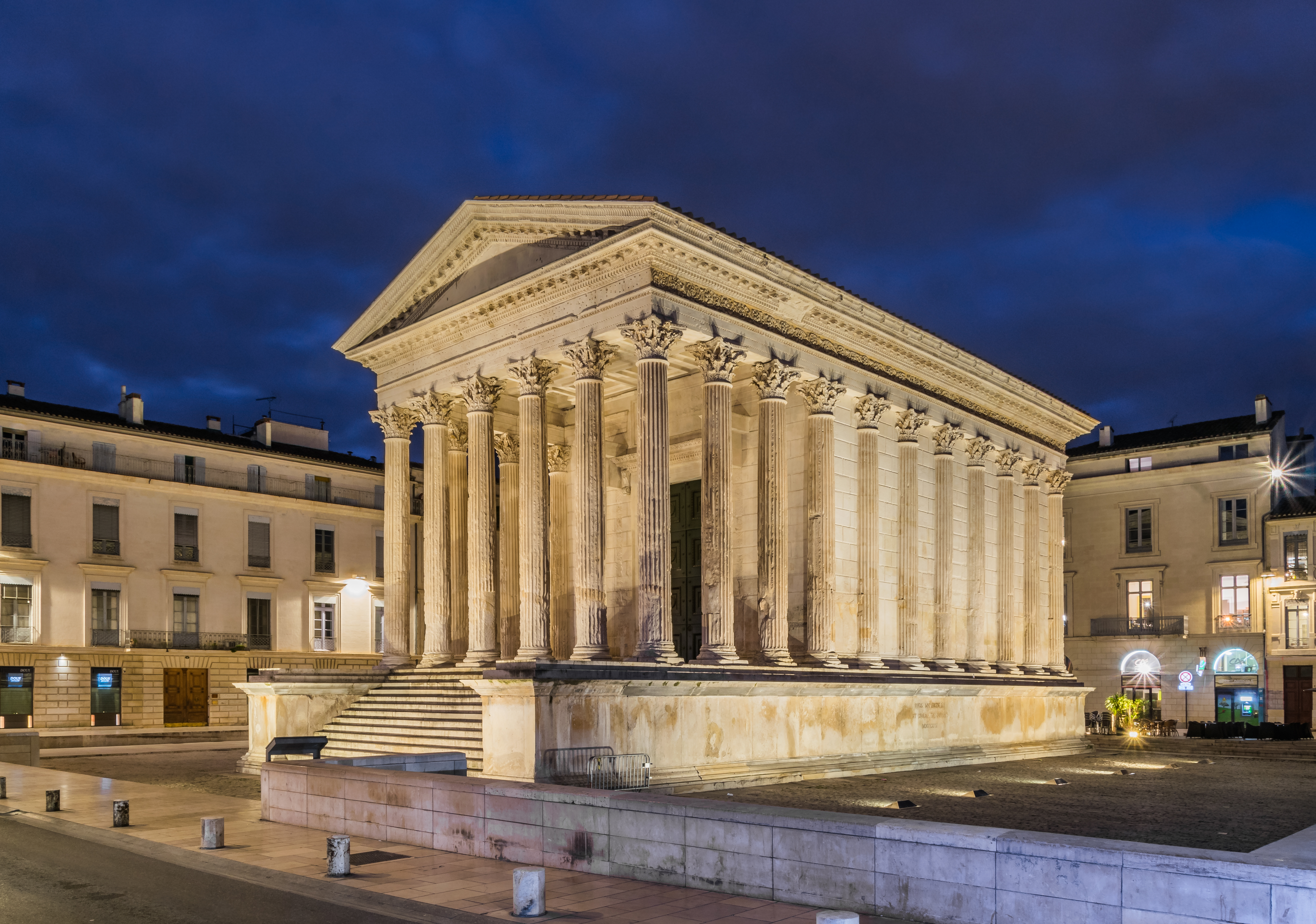
Jefferson modeled Virginia's capitol on the Maison Carrée

Thomas Jefferson is credited with the overall design of the new Capitol, together with French architect Charles-Louis Clérisseau. The design was modeled after the Maison Carrée at Nîmes in southern France, an ancient Roman temple. The only other state to accurately copy an ancient model is the Vermont State House, which based its portico on the Temple of Hephaestus in Athens. Jefferson had Clérisseau substitute the Ionic order over the more ornate Corinthian column designs of the prototype in France. At the suggestion of Clérisseau, it used a variant of the Ionic order designed by Italian student of Andrea Palladio, Vincenzo Scamozzi.

The cornerstone was laid on August 18, 1785, with Governor Patrick Henry in attendance, prior to the completion of its design. In 1786, a set of architectural drawings and a plaster model were sent from France to Virginia, where it was executed by Samuel Dobie. It was sufficiently completed for the General Assembly to meet there in October 1792.

It is one of only twelve Capitols in the United States without an external dome. (The others are the Capitols of Alaska, Delaware, Florida, Hawaii, Louisiana, New Mexico, New York, North Dakota, Ohio, Oregon and Tennessee.)

=== American Civil War ===
The building also served as the Capitol of the Confederacy during the American Civil War (1861–65) (It was the Confederacy's second home, the first being the Alabama State Capitol in Montgomery, Alabama).

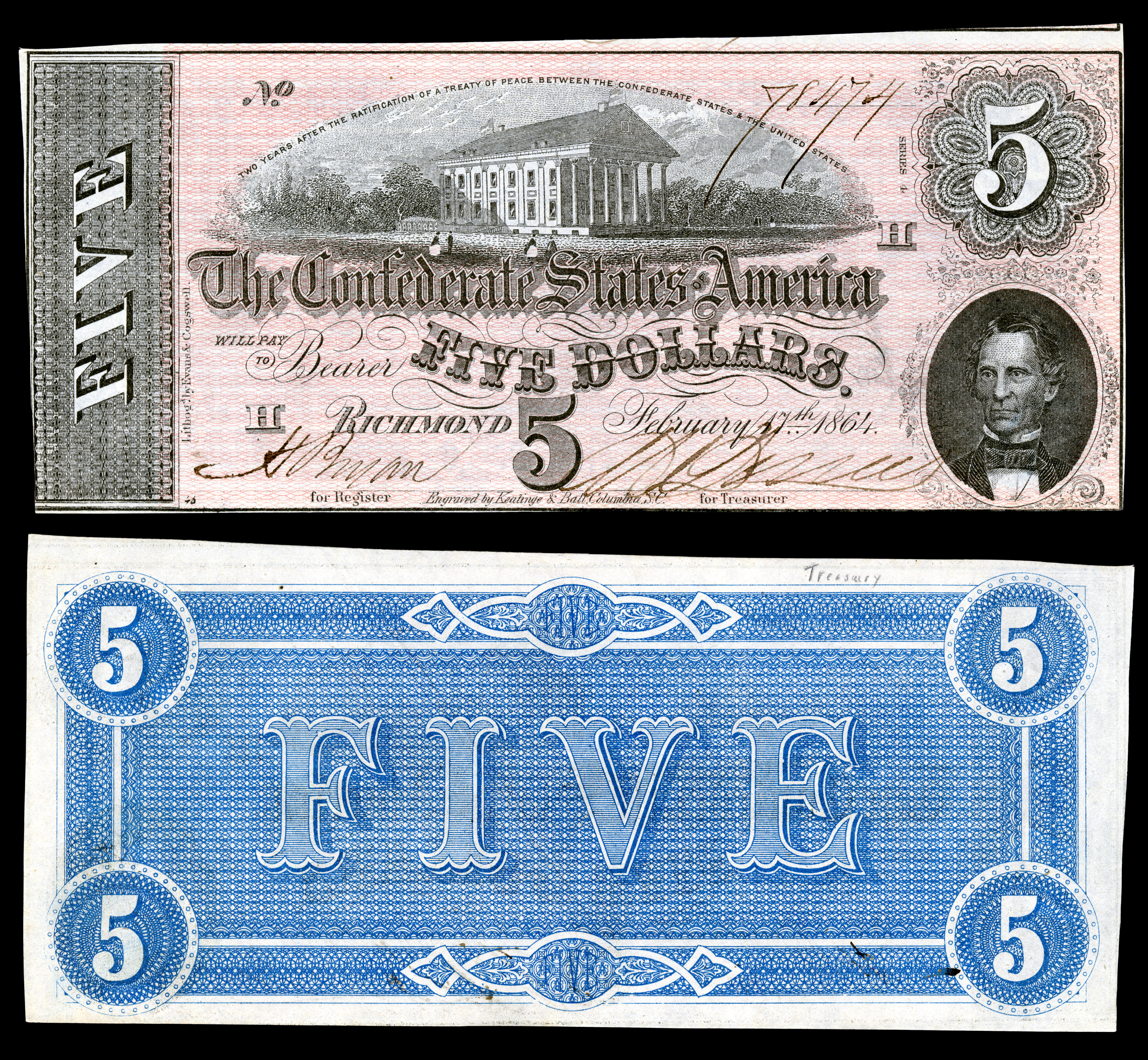
Virginia State Capitol depicted on an 1864 Confederate $5 banknote

The Capitol, the adjacent Virginia Governor's Mansion, and the White House of the Confederacy (about three blocks to the north on East Clay Street) were spared when departing Confederate troops were ordered to burn the city's warehouses and factories, and fires spread out of control in April 1865. John Brown's carpet-bag, full of documents including many unpublished ones, was kept in the Virginia Capitol from 1860 to 1865 by Andrew Hunter, at that time a state senator. When Richmond fell, "so Yankees can't find them", the carpet-bag was hidden "between the wall and the plastering". It has never been found.

The first Flag of the United States to fly over the capitol since secession was hoisted by Lieutenant Johnston L. de Peyster. U.S. President Abraham Lincoln toured the Capitol during his visit to Richmond about a week before his assassination in Washington, D.C.

From April 6 until April 10, 1865, Lynchburg served as the Capital of Virginia. Under Gov. William Smith, the executive and legislative branches of the commonwealth moved to Lynchburg for the few days between the fall of Richmond and the fall of the Confederacy.

On July 24, 2020, House Speaker Eileen Filler-Corn ordered the removal of a statue of Confederate General Robert E. Lee, along with busts of J.E.B. Stuart, Stonewall Jackson, Jefferson Davis, and other Confederates from the historic Old House Chamber.

=== 1870 Tragedy ===
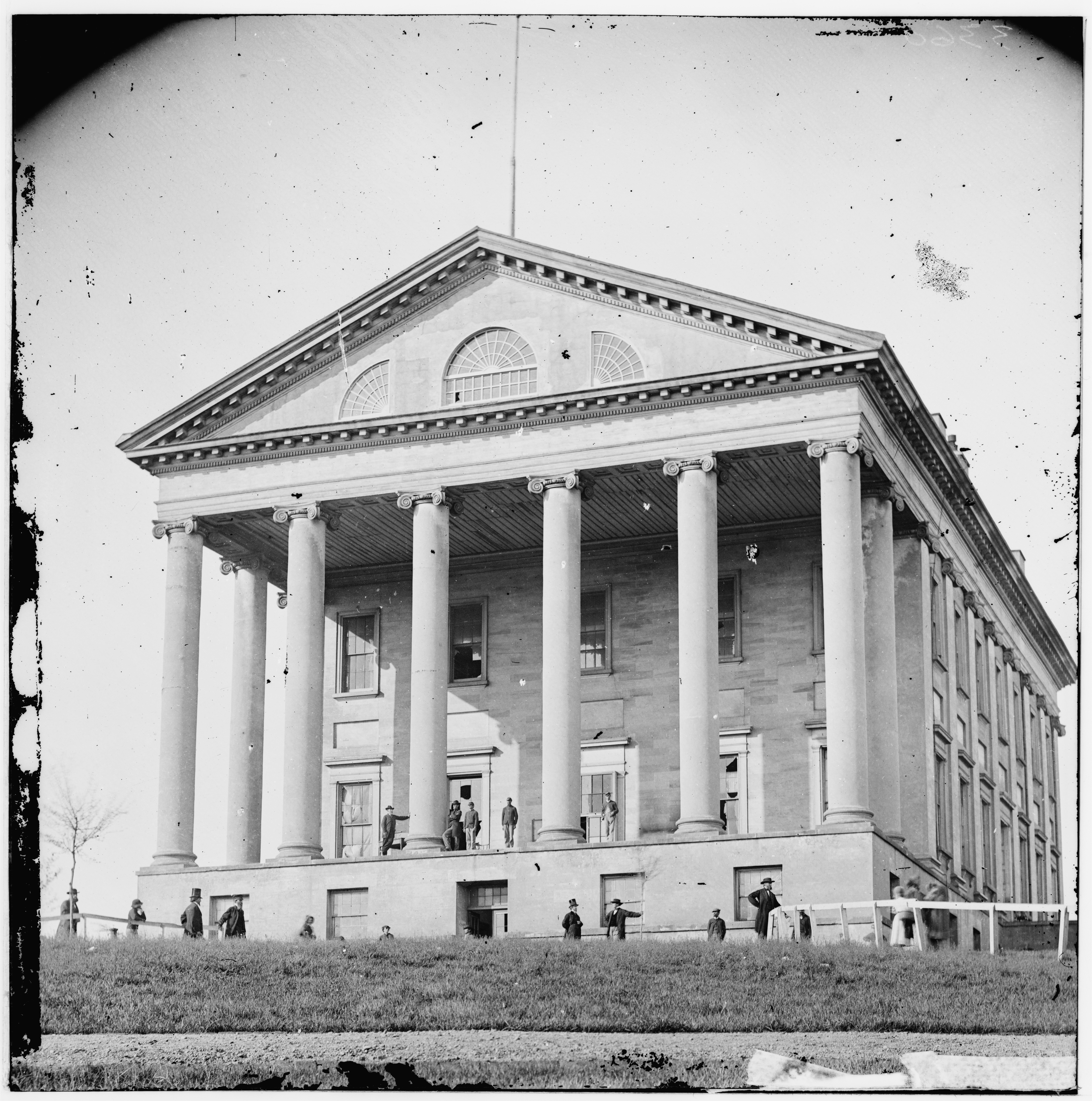
Capitol in 1865

After the end of the American Civil War, during the Reconstruction period, Virginia was under military rule for almost five years, ending in January 1870. In the ensuing months, a dispute over leadership of the Richmond government resulted in the Virginia Supreme Court of Appeals holding a hearing on April 27, 1870, in the large courtroom on the second floor of the Capitol. Several hundred people crowded in. Before the proceedings could begin, the gallery gave way and fell to the courtroom floor. This added weight, in addition to the crowd already there, caused the entire courtroom floor to give way, falling 40 feet (12 m) into the House of Delegates chamber.

The injured stumbled, crawled or were carried out onto the Capitol lawn during the mayhem that followed. Sixty-two people were killed and 251 injured. There were no women believed to have been present when the collapse occurred. The dead included a grandson of Patrick Henry, and three members of the General Assembly. Injured included both men contesting the Richmond mayoral position, the speaker of the House of Delegates, a judge and ex-governor Henry H. Wells. Former Confederate general Montgomery D. Corse was partially blinded by the collapse.

=== Rebuilding, expansion, renovation ===
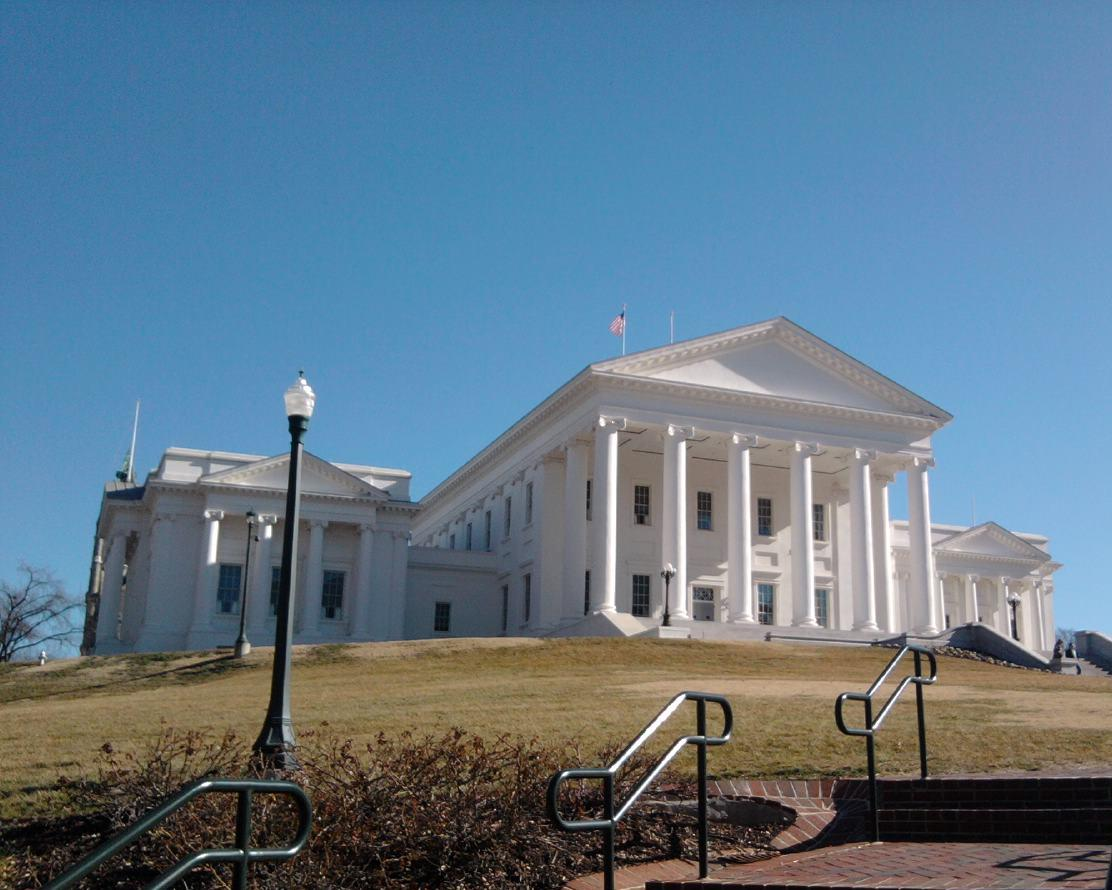
Modern renovation with wings on both sides

Despite demands for the building's demolition, the damage from the tragedy of 1870 was repaired. In 1904, two wings (not in the original plans) were added to the east and west ends of the building to provide much-needed additional space for the growing legislature. These additions were built to the collaborative designs of three of Virginia's leading architects and architectural firms: Frye & Chesterman of Lynchburg, John Kevan Peebles of Norfolk and Noland & Baskervill of Richmond.

The Senate first met in its new chamber in 1906.

In 2003, the assembly approved $83.1 million for the renovation, restoration and expansion of the Capitol. Work began in 2004 and was completed on May 1, 2007. Among major changes are a completely new HVAC control system, updated mechanical, storm water and plumbing systems, and construction of a 27,000-square-foot (2,500 m^{2}) expansion beneath the hill on the south lawn. The expansion provides a visitor's entrance that is compliant with the Americans with Disabilities Act, plus office space and meeting rooms, and better security management. The final cost of the restoration was approximately $104 million. The extension was designed by architect Sonja Bijelić of RMJM.

The Virginia National Guard was activated to provide extra security at the Virginia State Capitol, prior to the 2021 inauguration of Joe Biden, in response to the FBI warning of possible armed protests at U.S. capitals.

=== Individuals known to have lain in state/repose ===
- June 1806: George Wythe, Signer of the Declaration of Independence from Virginia
- April 22–23, 1850: John C. Calhoun, 7th Vice President of the United States; then-United States Senator from South Carolina
- February 10–11, 1857: Preston Brooks, then-United States Senator from South Carolina
- October 29–30, 1859: John Y. Mason, then-United States Minister to France (1854–1859)
- January 21, 1862: John Tyler, Tenth President of the United States; 23rd Governor of Virginia
- February 14, 1862: O. Jennings Wise, Confederate captain, son of the 33rd Governor of Virginia, Henry A. Wise
- March 18–20, 1863: John Pelham "The Galant Pelham", Confederate major
- May 15, 1863: Thomas J. "Stonewall" Jackson, Confederate general
- September 15–16, 1864: John Hunt Morgan, Confederate general
- March 1–4, 1873: Edward "Allegheny" Johnson, Confederate general
- October 23–24, 1875: George Pickett, Confederate general
- May 20, 1887: William "Extra Billy" Smith, 30th and 35th Governor of Virginia
- May 30, 1893: Jefferson Davis, President of the Confederate States of America
- June 8, 1899: John Bell Bigger, Clerk of the House of Delegates & Keeper of the Rolls of the Commonwealth (1865–1879; 1883–1899)
- September 28, 1899: Henry Heth, Confederate Major-General
- October 9, 1903: Bradley Tyler Johnson Confederate general and member of the Senate of Virginia (1875–1877)
- June 15, 1971: J. Sargeant Reynolds, then-Lieutenant Governor of Virginia
- June 8, 1991: Remains of unknown Confederate soldier
- September 30, 1991: A. L. Philpott, then-Speaker of the Virginia House of Delegates
- February 11, 2011: Leroy R. Hassell Sr., then-Chief Justice of the Virginia Supreme Court (first African American in Virginia to be afforded the honor)
- January 29–30, 2013 Harry L. Carrico, Former Chief Justice with over 42 years of service as an active Justice on the Virginia Supreme Court
- September 6, 2017: Lacey Putney, Former House Speaker and longest serving legislator in Virginian history (1962–2014)
- January 30, 2025: Henry L. Marsh, III, Member of the Senate of Virginia (1992–2014), first African American mayor of the City of Richmond (1977–1982), and civil rights attorney

== Interior ==
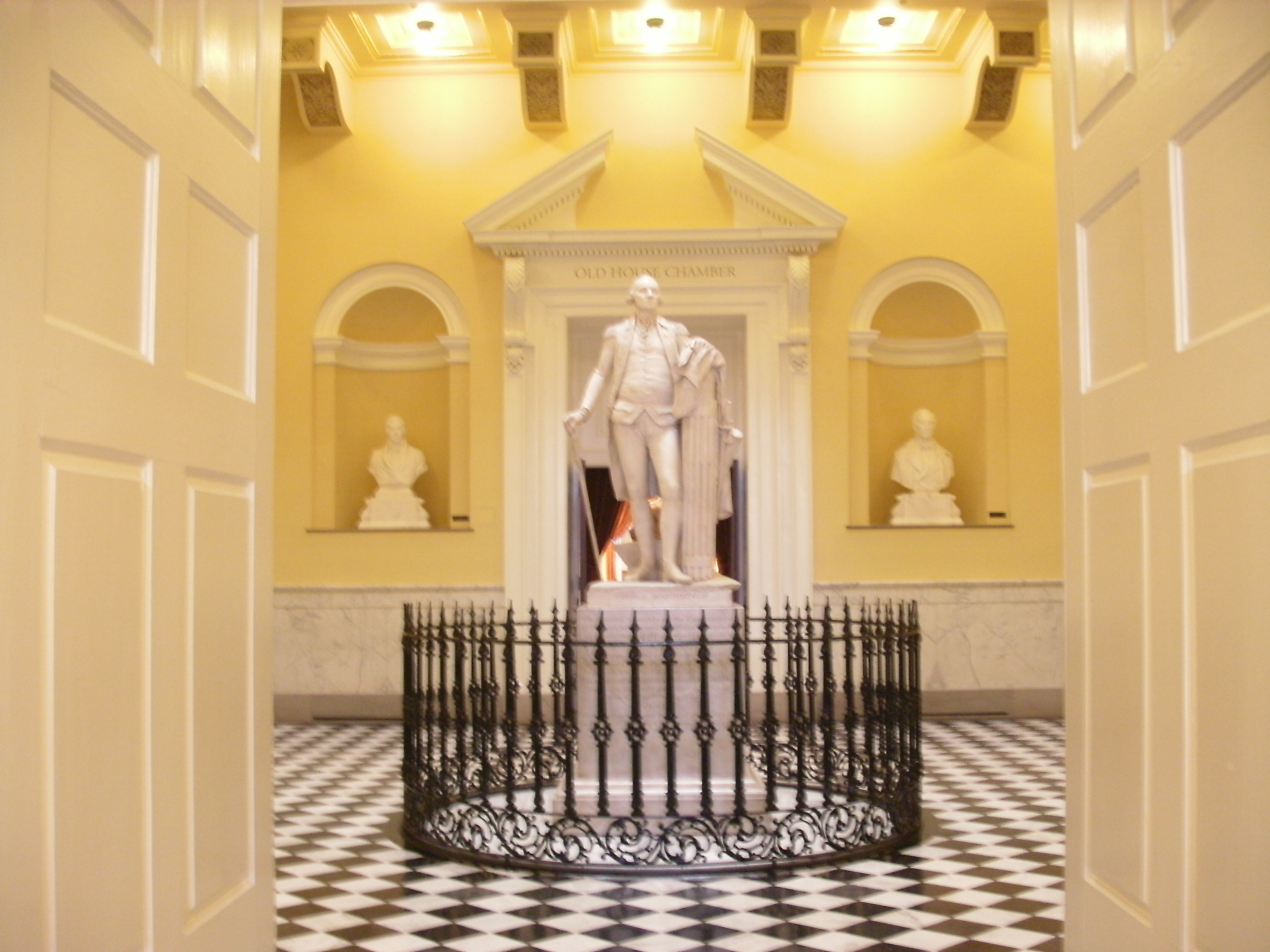
Rotunda, with Jean-Antoine Houdon's statue of George Washington in the center

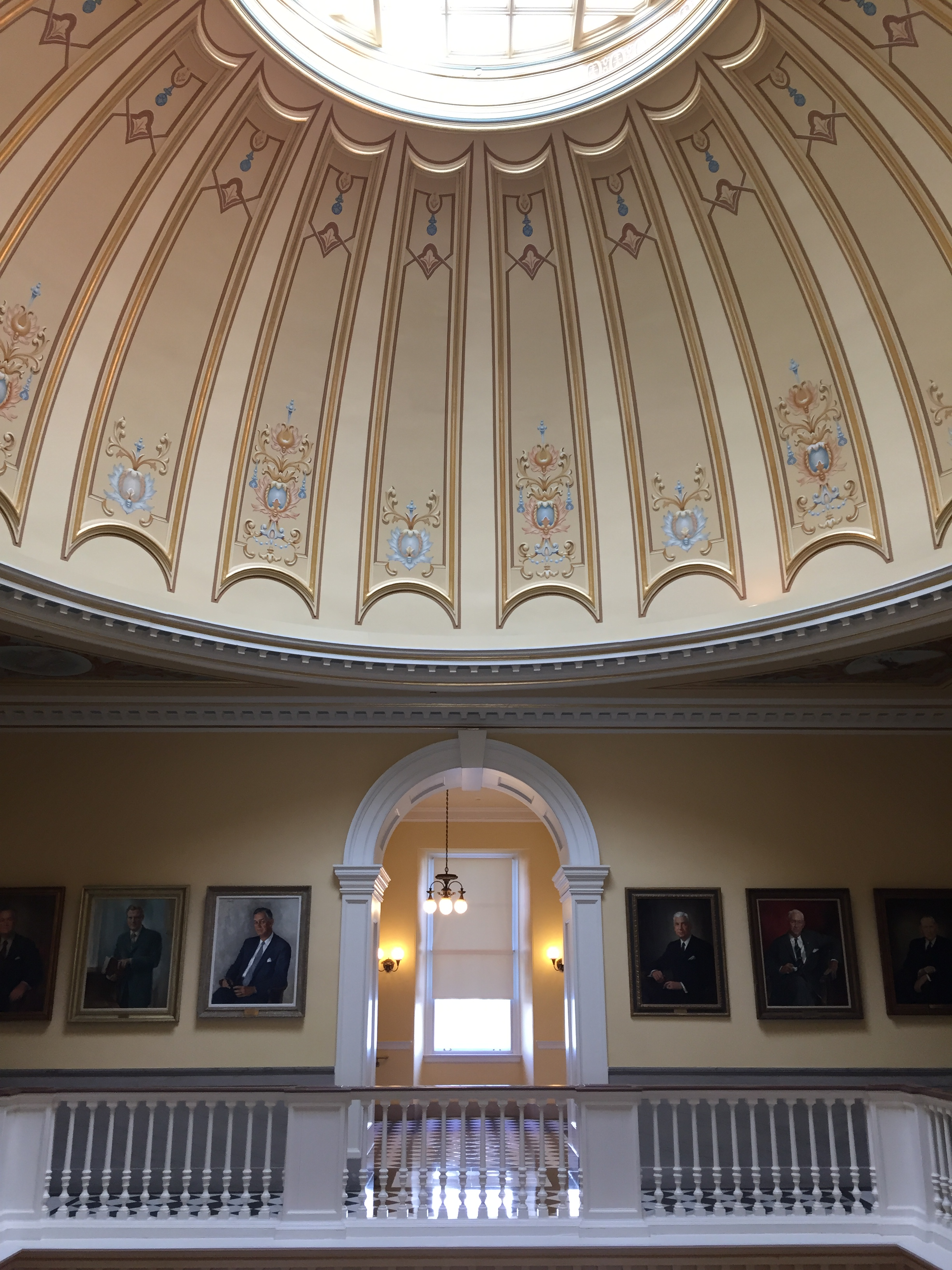
Roof of the rotunda

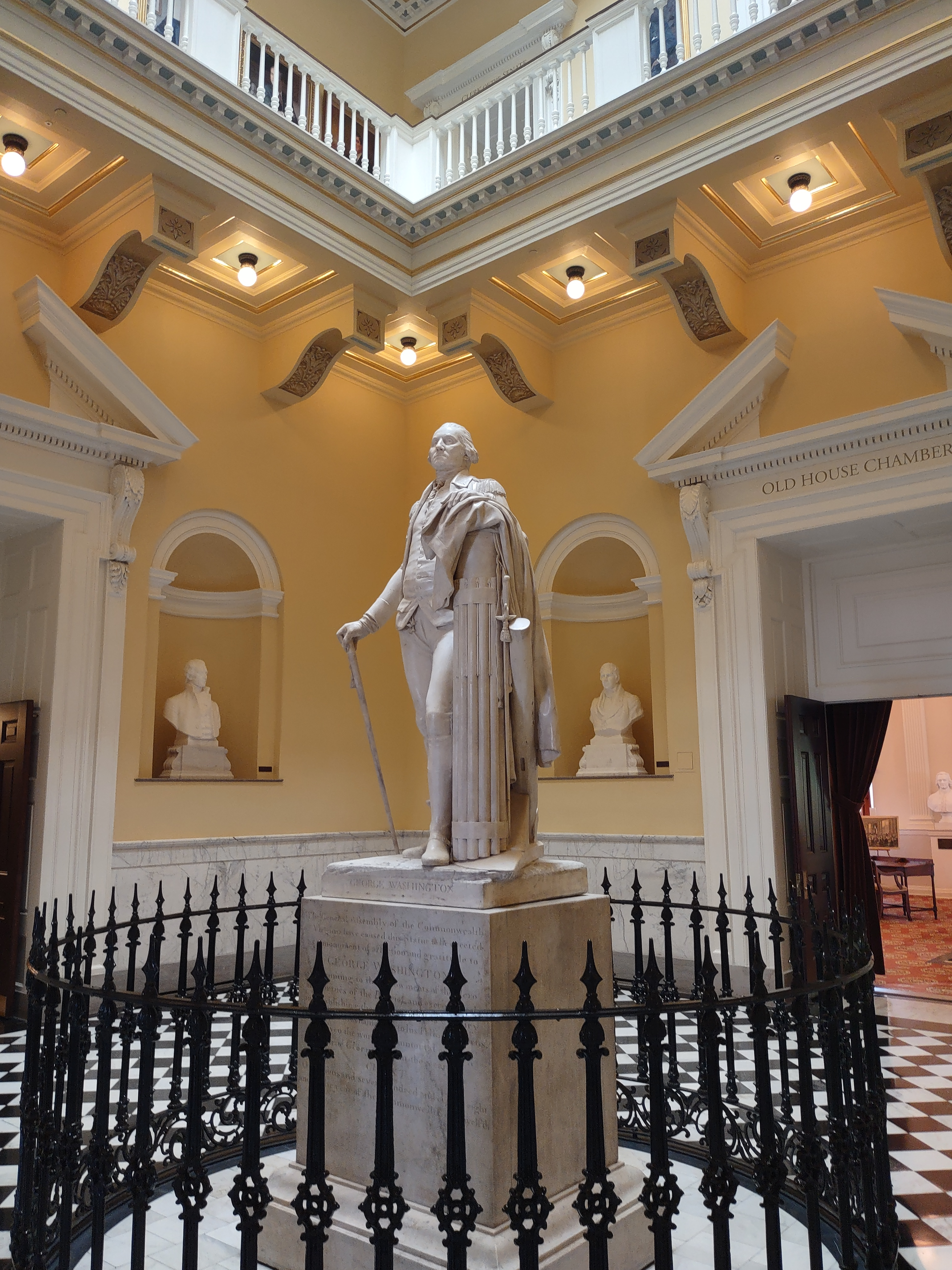
Rotunda, different angle

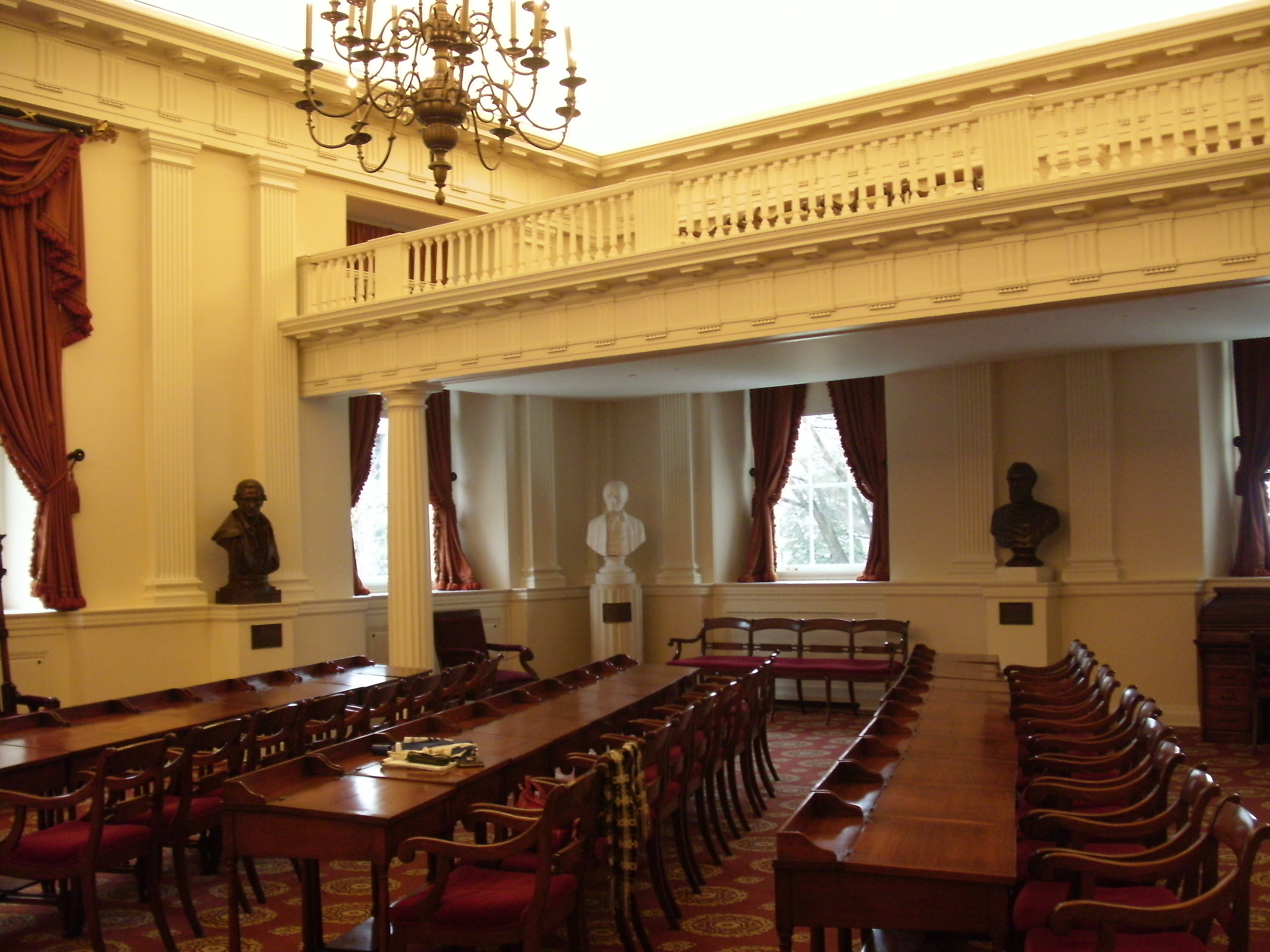
Old House of Delegates Chamber

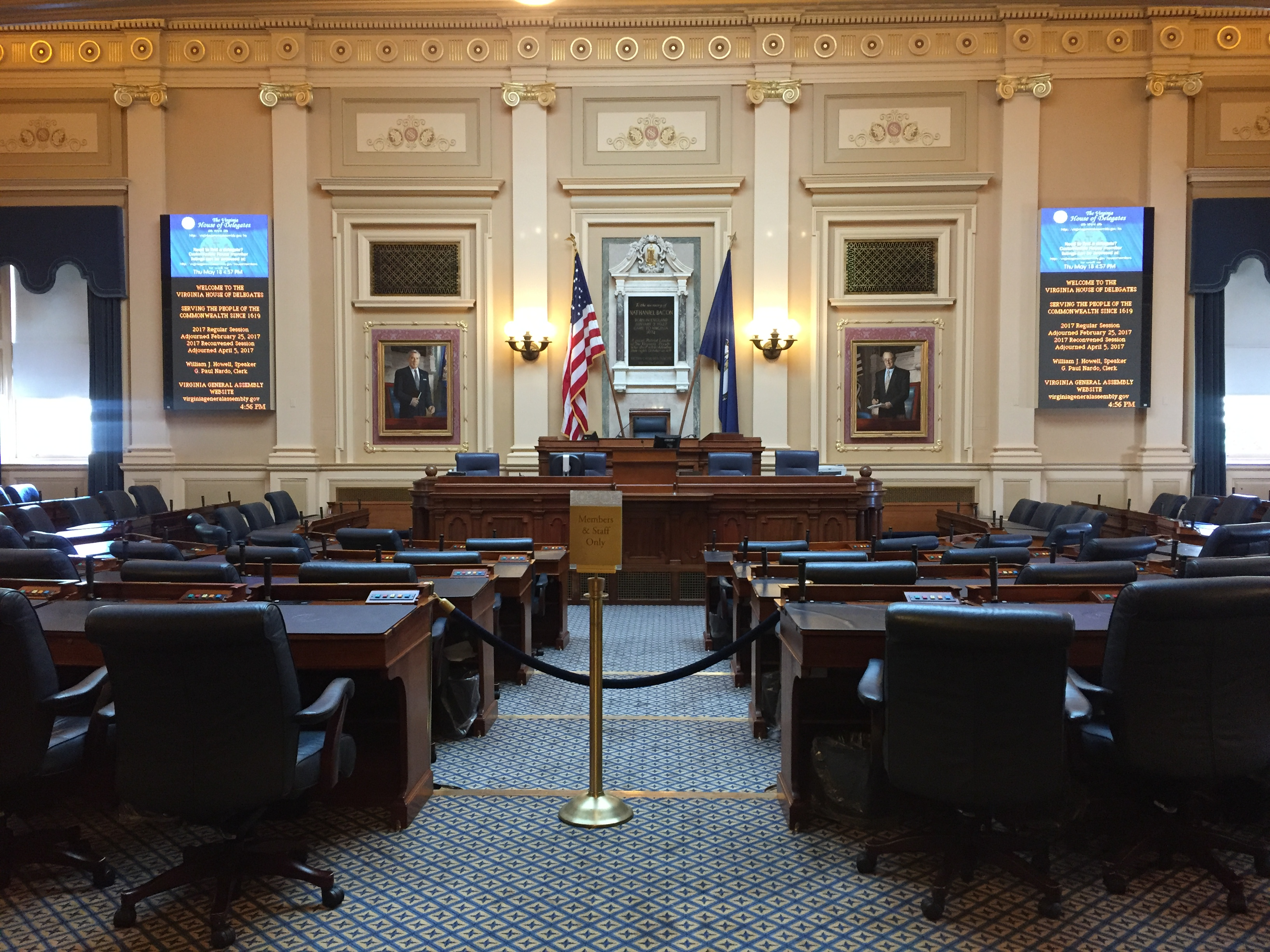
(New) House of Delegates Chamber

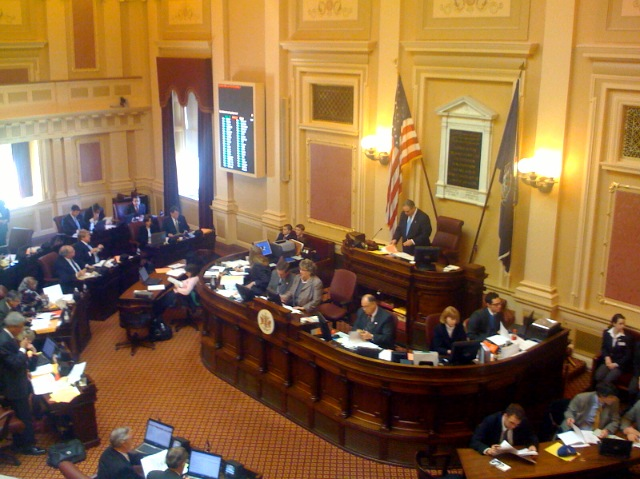
Senate Chamber (in session)

== Capitol Square ==
- Bell Tower
- U.S. National Register of Historic Places
- Virginia Landmarks Register
- Location: Capitol Sq., Richmond, Virginia
- Area: 14.1 acres (5.7 ha)
- Built: 1824
- Architects: Swain, Levi
- Architectural style: Federal
- NRHP reference No.: 69000347
- VLR No.: 127-0121

Significant dates
- Added to NRHP: June 11, 1969
- Designated VLR: November 5, 1968

The area around the Capitol is known as Capitol Square. It contains several monuments to prominent Virginians and events in Virginia:

- Washington Monument, 1858

In 1869, the monument was completed, with statues of the following encircling the base:
- Patrick Henry
- Thomas Jefferson
- Andrew Lewis
- John Marshall
- George Mason
- Thomas Nelson Jr.

- General Thomas J. "Stonewall" Jackson Statue, 1875; removed 2026
- Governor William "Extra Billy" Smith Statue, 1906; removed 2026
- Dr. Hunter Holmes McGuire Statue, 1904; removed 2026
- Zero Milestone, 1929, for measuring highway distances from the city of Richmond
- Edgar Allan Poe Statue, 1958
- Virginia Civil Rights Memorial, 2008
- Mantle, honoring Native Americans, 2018
- Virginia Women's Monument, 2019
- The Bell Tower was built in 1824–1825. It is still used for ceremonial ringing.
- Oliver Hill Building (1892–1894)

== In film and television ==
Given its Classical Revival style of architecture along with the fact that its color is white, the Capitol was the double for the exterior shots of The White House featured in the movie The Contender (2000) starring Gary Oldman, Joan Allen, Jeff Bridges, Christian Slater.

In the 1993 comedy-drama film Dave with Kevin Kline, Sigourney Weaver, Frank Langella; the House of Delegates chamber served as the set for the United States House of Representatives, where the title character President addresses a joint session of Congress.

In the 2012 film Lincoln, the Virginia State Capitol was used as a stand-in for the United States Capitol in Washington, D.C., during the Civil War era with some film retouching.

== See also ==
- List of Virginia state legislatures
- List of National Historic Landmarks in Virginia
- National Register of Historic Places listings in Richmond, Virginia
- List of state and territorial capitols in the United States
