= Virginia Library Association =

Non-profit library organization

- Abbreviation: VLA
- Formation: 1905
- Location: Virginia Beach, Virginia
- Members: 5100
- Executive Director: Jennifer Scott Brown
- President: Nancy Falciani
- Vice President/President-Elect: Zach Elder
- Website: vla.org

The Virginia Library Association (VLA) is a nonprofit organization whose purpose is "to develop, promote, and improve library and information services, library staff, and the profession of librarianship in order to advance literacy and learning and to ensure access to information in the Commonwealth of Virginia." The VLA is divided into six regions. It maintains the VLA Jobline, a list of jobs available in libraries throughout the Commonwealth of Virginia.

== History ==
The VLA was founded in 1905 when John Pendleton Kennedy, who served as Virginia State Librarian from 1903 to 1907, organized a meeting in Richmond to discuss forming a statewide library association. The state library was selected as the home of the new organization.

== Membership ==
VLA membership is open to any person, organization, or library. Honorary Life Memberships may be bestowed upon nominated individuals selected by the Awards and Recognition Committee, approved by the Executive Committee, and affirmed by VLA members on the annual ballot.

== Organizational structure ==
The Council of the Virginia Library Association is the governing body of the organization. A quorum consists of one half of the voting members of the Council plus one. The elected officers of the VLA comprise the Executive Committee. Those positions include: President, Vice President/President-elect, Second Vice President, Immediate Past President, Secretary, and Treasurer. The Executive Committee designates an Executive Director.

== Advocacy ==
The VLA has been a strong advocate in support of adequate funding for libraries, convincing the Virginia General Assembly to appropriate $50,000 for public libraries in the first such law to establish state aid in 1942.

In the 1950s and 60s, the VLA took a stand to combat censorship and support intellectual freedom.

In the 1970s, the VLA encouraged its members to become involved in letter writing campaigns to legislators and began participating in the annual Library Legislative Day, when members travel to Washington, D.C. to advocate concerns to congressmen and senators.

== Major publications ==
Virginia Libraries was launched in April 1928 and initially served as the unofficial vehicle of the Virginia Library Association. It is now recognized as the official publication of the association and continues to be published quarterly. Archived copies from 1996 to the present are located on the Virginia Tech Digital Library and Archives Electronic Journals website.

The VLA Newsletter was published from 1987 through 2010. Archived copies from February 1995 through 2010 are located on the Virginia Library Association website.

== Conferences ==
The VLA sponsors an Annual Conference and a Paraprofessional Annual Conference.

== Awards ==
The VLA sponsors several awards, to include the following:

- George Mason Award goes to an individual librarian; a library; a person or organization distinguished for advocacy of libraries and/or information access; or to a person, business, or academic program whose activity has contributed to the development, growth, and extension of library and information services in the local community, the state, or the nation.
- Trustee Library Award is given in recognition of distinguished service to libraries or a library in Virginia.
- Friends of the Library Award is given to one or more Friends groups in recognition of distinguished service to libraries or a library in Virginia.
- Honorary Life Membership is awarded to trustees or former trustees, Friends of Virginia libraries, and Virginia librarians and paraprofessionals who hold membership and have made outstanding contributions to Virginia librarianship.
- Jefferson Cup Award is given in recognition of distinguished work of American biography, historical fiction, or history for young people. The awards seeks to promote reading about America's past, encourage quality writing of U.S. history/biography/historical fiction for young people, and to recognize authors in these disciplines. The Jefferson Cup Award is the only award that has been awarded annually since its inception.

== See also ==
- List of libraries in the United States
