= Helene Fuld =

Helene Fuld may refer to:

- Helene Fuld College of Nursing, New York City, founded in 1945
- Helene Fuld Health Trust, a trust for nursing education, founded in 1935 as the Helene Fuld Health Foundation
- Helene Fuld Health Trust Simulation Center at the Columbia University School of Nursing, New York City
- Helene Fuld Multimedia Center at Godchaux Hall, Vanderbilt University
- Helene Fuld Health Trust National Institute for Evidence-based Practice in Nursing and Healthcare, Ohio State University.
- College of Health Professions, Helene Fuld School of Nursing of Coppin State University (originally of Provident Hospital, Baltimore)
- Helene Fuld School of Nursing, closed 2011, of Capital Health Regional Medical Center, William McKinley Memorial Hospital, Trenton, New Jersey
- Carolyn Sifton-Helene Fuld Library, at the University of Manitoba
