= North General Hospital =

Geography
- Location: (1979 to 1991); 1919 Madison Avenue (between 123rd & 124th sts.) (1991 to 2010); 1879 Madison Avenue (between 120th and 121st sts.), East Harlem, Manhattan, New York, United States
- Coordinates: 40°48′12″N 73°56′31″W

History
- Founded: 1979
- Closed: 2010

Links
- Lists: Hospitals in New York State
- Other links: Hospitals in Manhattan

North General Hospital (NGH) was an American private, not-for-profit, voluntary teaching hospital located in New York City in the East Harlem section of Manhattan at Marcus Garvey Park. It was founded in 1979 to replace, as tenant, the Hospital for Joint Diseases (HJD), which vacated its East Harlem facility and moved that same year downtown to East 17th street at Stuyvesant Square. NGH was the only minority-run, voluntary teaching hospital in the State of New York. NGH was also the only private (non-public) hospital in Harlem. After 31 years, North General Hospital closed in 2010 under financial duress of bankruptcy.

== History ==
The New York City government had endured a severe fiscal crisis in 1975. Two years later, in 1977, the Hospital for Joint Diseases (HJD) — which had occupied the East Harlem location on Madison Avenue, between 123rd and 124th streets, since 1905 — began construction on a new building, downtown, East 17th street at Second Avenue, across from Stuyvesant Square. In 1979, HJD moved there. The move was a loss for the Harlem community.

Leading up to the move, advocacy groups waged a campaign to keep a hospital at the Madison Avenue location. Randolph Guggenheimer (1907–1999), the hospital's only trustee at the time, and Eugene Louis McCabe (1937–1998) spearheaded an effort to insure that hospital services would continue in the old building, which was renamed North General Hospital. On January 28, 1977, a New York charter was made, forming the corporation of Joint Diseases North General Hospital.

=== Economic backdrop ===
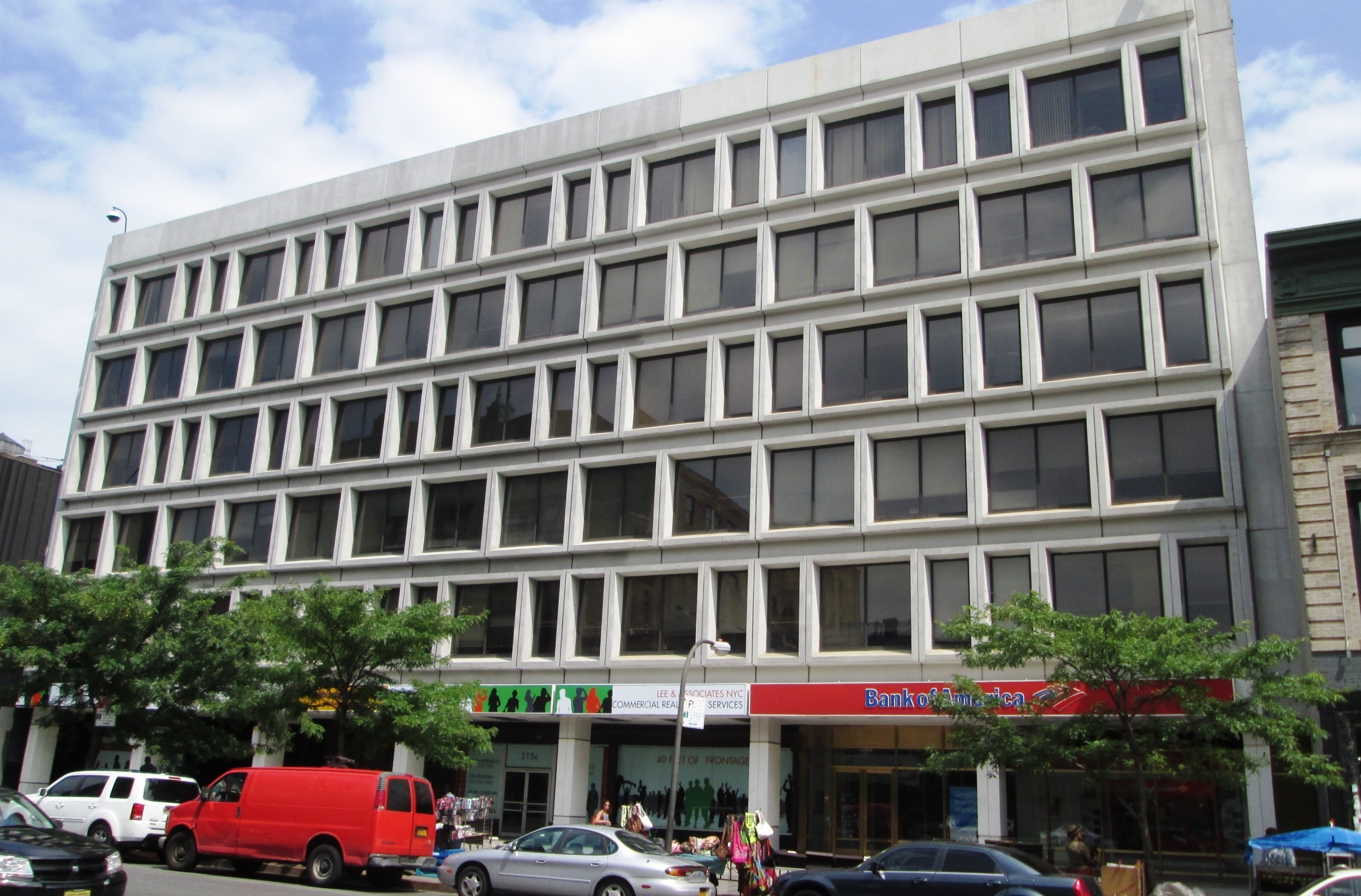
Sydenham Hospital

Ed Koch became Mayor of New York on January 1, 1978, and soon after taking office, began working on the City budget, which was still an ominous concern in the wake of the fiscal crisis that nearly bankrupted the city in 1975. Koch, in short order, imposed an additional 10% reduction in funding for municipal hospitals and slated Metropolitan Hospital (in East Harlem) and Sydenham Hospital (on West 125th street) for closure. Sydenham closed in the Spring of 1980 despite wide criticism that Harlem's medical needs were being neglected.

NGH's economic impact on Harlem had been cited as significant. Journal of Health and Human Resources Administration published in 1988 that North General Hospital was the largest private employer in Harlem. Over 70 percent of its workforce resided in Harlem.

=== 1979 – Joint Diseases North General Hospital is founded ===
In 1979, after HJD moved downtown, the Joint Diseases North General Hospital became the new occupant in Harlem. The challenge for NGH, for its entire existence, was laden with fiscal stress, partly owed to a need for capital expenditures to restore and upgrade an aged, decaying building – a facility that NGH did not own in the beginning. NGH also weathered fiscal stress from treating significantly higher percentage of patients who were either uninsured or low income or both.

After its opening, business consultants gave North General only 3 months of survival.

— Renelda Higgins – 1985 (The Crisis)

=== 1987 ===
On October 27, 1987, Joint Diseases North General Hospital shortened its name to "North General Hospital." By then, Governor Mario Cuomo had approved a state grant of $118 million toward the North General hospital construction. That year, the hospital was operating on a $42 million budget with 1,900 employees – 70 percent living in Harlem.

=== 1991 – new building, new location ===
On December 12, 1991, North General Hospital moved into a newly built, modern facility at 1879 Madison Avenue, between 120th and 121st Streets, two blocks south of its old address.

=== Signs of systemic financial duress ===
By 2004, private hospitals in New York City were in arrears by more than $100 million in payments to employee benefit and pension funds, double the amount of 2003. Wall Street debt analysts rated hospitals of New York State the weakest in the nation and stated that the situation was worsening. Eight accounted for two-thirds of the debt: (1) Brookdale in Brooklyn, (2) Jamaica and (3) Parkway Hospitals in Queens, (4) Saint Vincent's and (5) Beth Israel Medical Center, each with several locations in multiple boroughs and headquartered in Manhattan, (6) North General Hospital, (7) Cabrini Medical Center, both in Manhattan, and (8) Our Lady of Mercy Medical Center in the Bronx.

=== 2010 – closing ===
At May 31, 2010, North General Hospital had a debt of $293 million. Barely two months after the closing of Saint Vincent's Hospital in Greenwich Village, North General Hospital – which, according to the New York Times, had become a symbol of New York City's political and philanthropic commitment to Harlem – announced on June 28, 2010, that it would close four days later – on July 2, 2010. On that same day – July 2, 2010 – North General Hospital filed for Chapter 11 bankruptcy and actually closed on July 9, 2010. Effective June 30, 2011, the United States Bankruptcy Court for the Southern District of New York approved a Chapter 11 Plan of Liquidation for North General Hospital and its affiliated debtors. Under the Plan, a Liquidation Trustee was appointed and the assets of North General Hospital were sold and/or transferred back to the Dormitory Authority of the State of New York. Rev. Calvin O. Butts III had been Chairman of the Board at the time.

=== Post-closing analysis ===
With respect to the loss of emergency rooms in New York City, the New York Times, in 2011, pointed out that the city lost three hospital emergency rooms in 2008, two in 2009, and two in 2010 – Saint Vincent's and North General. Saint Vincent's had handled more than 60,000 emergency visits a year, while North General's ER had recorded 36,000 annual visits. Peninsula Hospital in Far Rockaway, Queens closed in 2012.

=== New facility and hospital provider at 1879 Madison Avenue ===
Sometime between 2010 and 2012, the New York City Health and Hospitals Corporation took over the former site of North General Hospital – at 1879 Madison Avenue, between 121st and 122nd streets. In 2012, the facility was renamed the "Henry J. Carter Specialty Hospital and Nursing Facility," in honor of Hank Carter, the Founder and CEO of Wheelchair Charities, Inc. A new building for the Carter Center was completed on the site around 2016.

=== Residential co-ops at the old location at 1919 Madison ===
Maple Plaza, an eight-story, 155-unit residential co-op was built at 1919 Madison Avenue in the 1990s when North General Hospital moved into its new quarters two blocks south. Maple Plaza was developed in the 1990s under a plan by the city and North General Hospital to revive the area around the hospital, which, at the time was blighted. Maple Court, another similar project in the area with 135 units, was completed before Maple Plaza.

== Selected NGH programs ==
The Helene Fuld College of Nursing was founded in 1945 by the predecessor of North General Hospital, the Hospital for Joint Diseases. The nursing college, then a school, was named after Helene Fuld in 1955 after it received a grant from the Helene Fuld Health Foundation – a foundation established by Leonhard Felix Fuld, LLM, PhD (1883–1965), a benefactor of North General Hospital, in honor of his mother, Helene Fuld (née Schwab; 1858–1923).

== Records repository ==
A repository of records pertaining to medical staff, residency training, and other related matters are available through the Federation Credentials Verification Service (FCVS), which is administered by the Federation of State Medical Boards

== Selected personnel ==
=== Physicians ===
- Michael Palese, MD, chief of urology at the North General Hospital from 2004 to 2008

=== Trustees (directors) ===
- Randolph Guggenheimer (1907–1999), founding trustee, and upon retirement, was named chairman emeritus
- Livingston Le Stanley Francis (born 1929), chairperson in 1998; among other things, Francis was vice chairman of the United Hospital Fund of New York
- Edward E. Davis, Jr. (died 2010), trustee
- Eugene A. Norman, trustee, who also served as chairperson
- Rev. Calvin O. Butts III, chairperson
- Eugene Giscombe (1940–2016), vice-chairperson; born in Harlem, he was a noted Harlem real estate developer; Giscombe was known as the "Mayor of 125th Street"
- Mark Jeziorski, trustee
- Janice Savin Williams, investment banker and community activist
- Bernard Aronson (1907–1980)
- Jewell Jackson McCabe, once married to NGH president and CEO Eugene Louis McCabe
- Antonio Pérez, EdD, served as a director until 2008. While a director, he had served as secretary of the board. He had been appointed president of Borough of Manhattan Community College in 1995.
- Natan Wekselbaum served as director until 2007. He was then the president and CEO of Gracious Home, a Manhattan hardware and home furnishing store that had been in his family from 1963 to 2010.
- Steven C. Bussey (born 1967) served as director until 2007. In 2010, Bussey became a managing director at Alvarez & Marsal. From 2011 to 2015, he was CEO of Harlem United Community Aids Center, Inc.
- Renelda Higgins (née Renelda Ann Meeks; born 1950) was named director in 1990. Since at least 1985, Higgins had been the director of public relations. Her former husband, Chester Arthur Higgins, Jr. (born 1946), is a notable photographer and son of journalist Chester Arthur Higgins, Sr. (1917–2000), who, among other things, was editor of The Crisis from 1981 to 1983. One of five siblings, Renelda's younger brother, Reginald Kline Meeks, was, in 2000, elected to the Kentucky House of Representatives. Renelda remarried in the early 1990s to Benjamin J. Walker, Jr. (born 1950).
- Arthur Ashe became a board member February 1992. He died in 1993.

=== Executives ===
==== President and CEO ====
- 1979–1998: Eugene Louis McCabe (1937–1998), a healthcare activist, was founding president and CEO until his death. With philanthropist Randolph Guggenheimer, McCabe was co-founder of North General Hospital. McCabe was married to, divorced from, but remained close friends with Jewell Jackson McCabe, feminist, business executive, and social and political activist. When Gene McCabe died, he was married to Elsie, (née Elsie Alberta Crum), who, in 2009, married New York City Comptroller Bill Thompson. Before marrying McCabe, Elsie had been divorced from Roger Ellington Coy, whom she married in 1990. On February 1, 1996, the president of Hunter College, David Caputo, bestowed McCabe with the President's Award.
- 1999–2001: Harold Page Freeman, MD, was named president and CEO North General Hospital in 1999. He was the former president of the American Cancer Society and, before being appointed, was chief of surgery at NGH.
- 2001–2010: Samuel J. Daniel, MD (né Samuel Jeremiah Daniel; born 1950), President and CEO North General Hospital Daniel is married to Cheryl Joan McKissack (maiden; born 1961), granddaughter of Moses McKissack III (1879–1952). Moses III and his brother, Calvin Lunsford McKissack (1890–1968) co-founded in 1905 the family architectural and engineering firm, McKissack & McKissack, the first African-American-owned architectural firm in the United States and currently the oldest African American-owned architecture and engineering firm in the country.
- 2010–2011: John P. Maher, who had served as chief financial officer since 2006, was, on August 5, 2010, promoted to president and chief restructuring officer

==== Executive director ====
- Mark E. Baker

=== General counsel ===
- Blair Matthew Duncan (born 1962) was general counsel for NGH. Duncan subsequently served as vice president and senior counsel in the Corporate Law Department of Merrill Lynch. He is currently general counsel, administration, and executive vice president of the Upper Manhattan Empowerment Zone Development Corporation, located in Harlem. Duncan had also practiced as an attorney with Winston & Strawn and Mudge Rose Guthrie Alexander & Ferdon. Duncan graduated from Penn Law in 1994 and from Wharton with an MBA in finance in 1985. He earned a Bachelor of Science in mathematics from Michigan in 1983. Duncan grew up on the northwest side of Detroit in the Martin Park District, 2 blocks west of the University of Detroit Mercy McNichols Campus.

=== President's Advisory Council of NGH ===
- Stephen David Solender (born 1938) was chairman of the President's Advisory Council of NGH

=== Public relations ===
- Renelda Higgins (née Renelda Ann Meeks; born 1950) was named director in 1990. was appointed director of public relations around 1985.
- Blanca Perez, served as acting director of public relations in 1993.

We service a population with a very high level of indigence — about 65 percent Medicaid, 35 percent Medicare, and 5 percent unpaid. We're in a very poor area, and our location and the fact that we're a general care hospital means we're not able to capture and draw more specialized patients as some other hospitals are.

— Blanca Perez, Acting Director Public Relations, NGH – 1994 (Hospitals & Health Networks)

=== Lobbyists ===
- Michelle Paige Paterson, wife of former New York governor David Paterson, joined the staff of NGH in 2002 as director of community and government affairs. Michelle had been criticized for being a lobbyist while her husband was a state senator, citing conflicts of interests.

I didn't understand the flak we took for that. This is a hospital in an underserved community, not a for-profit corporation making big bucks. Isn't this what senators are supposed to do, help poor people in their district get access to health care?

— Michelle Paige Paterson – 2008 (New York Times)

=== Philanthropists ===
- Ralph Lauren and wife, Ricky Lauren, established a cancer center at North General Hospital in 2000

=== Civic memorials for Eugene McCabe ===
The stretch of Madison Avenue that runs in front of both former locations, from 118th to 124th streets – adjacent to Marcus Garvey Park – is named Eugene McCabe Way, in honor of Eugene Louis McCabe (1937–1998), President, CEO, and co-founder of North General Hospital. Mayor Rudolph W. Giuliani signed a bill dedicating it in McCabe's name about a year after his death.

In 2001, New York City Parks Commissioner Henry J. Stern renamed an athletic field in the area "Eugene McCabe Field." The field is adjacent to P.S. 79, and bounded by Park Avenue, East 120th Street and East 121st Street. In October 2001, a large scale renovation of the field, costing $1.887 million, was completed. It features a new athletic field with synthetic turf and a backstops for soccer and softball.

== Notable patients ==
- J. Raymond Jones (1899–1991), New York civic leader, died at North General Hospital
- Winifred (Winnie) Johnson (1918–1980), former member of the Cotton Club Girls (see Cotton Club Boys) who had sung with Duke Ellington. She briefly, from 1937 to 1938, was married to Stepin Fetchit. And she was the sister of Stretch Johnson. Winnie Johnson died in 1980 at NGH. She was also once married to Middleton H. Lambright, Jr., MD (1908–1999), the first African American physician to obtain full hospital privileges to practice medicine in Cleveland with the staffs of University Hospitals of Cleveland and Mount Sinai Hospital.

== Public policy and legal cases ==
Elaine W. v. Joint Diseases North General Hospital, Inc., 1993

In 1989, three pregnant, drug-addicted women filed a class action suit against Joint Diseases North General Hospital, claiming that the hospital's policy of excluding all pregnant women from its drug detoxification program violated state human rights laws against sexual discrimination in reproductive health care. The hospital responded, arguing that its broad exclusion was medically justified, primarily because the hospital had neither the obstetricians, nor the equipment, nor the license needed to provide prenatal care.

The New York Court of Appeals, the state's highest court, ruled that the policy did discriminate against pregnant women by treating them differently from others solely because they are pregnant. However, the court also ruled that the policy would be legally valid in situations where the hospital proved, after a trial, that (a) no pregnant woman could be treated safely in its drug detoxification program or (b) the hospital could not determine "within a reasonable medical certainty" which women could be treated safely. The court placed the burden of proof on the hospital. And, in proving it, the hospital had to adequately demonstrate that all prospective patients who were pregnant would face undue risk from a lack of on-site obstetrical services.

== Publications ==
- "An analysis of the factors that influence physicians in their choice of practice location, focusing on conditions and incentives which might encourage physicians to practice in inner-city areas," by Donald Meyers, et al. North General Hospital (1986); OCLC 19690011
- Pulse (magazine), published by North General Hospital; OCLC 47286126

== See also ==
- List of hospitals in New York City
- Harold P. Freeman portrait collection, New York Public Library; OCLC 54370499
- "Who's in Charge of Accountability? Board or Staff?" (audio), Speakers: John Kemp, United Cerebral Palsy; Livingston S. Francis, North General Hospital, Chesapeake Audio/Video Communications, Inc. (1993); OCLC 32920278
- An analysis of the factors that influence physicians in their choice of practice location, focusing on conditions and incentives which might encourage physicians to practice in inner-city areas," by Donald Meyers, North General Hospital (1986); OCLC 19690011
