= Jiayang Fan =

Chinese-American journalist (born 1984)

- 樊嘉扬
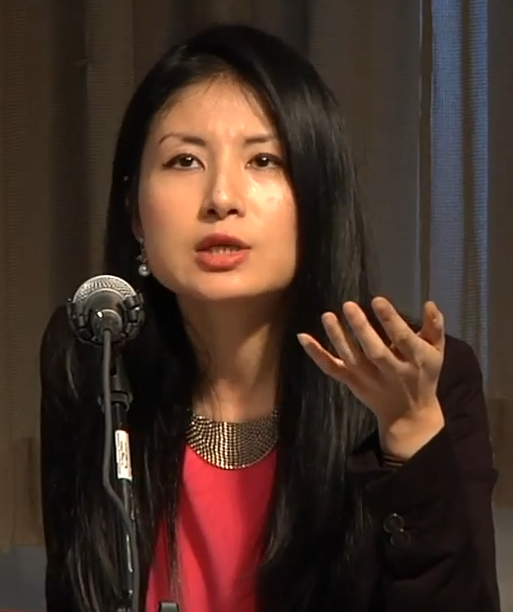
- Jiayang Fan in 2014
- Born: 4 August 1984 (age 42); Chongqing, China
- Education: Williams College
- Occupation: Journalist
- Employer: The New Yorker

Jiayang Fan (Chinese: 樊嘉扬; pinyin: Fán Jiāyáng; born 4 August 1984) is a Chinese-American journalist. She was born in Chongqing and immigrated to the United States at the age of seven. She has been a staff writer for The New Yorker since 2016. Her works include cultural and political commentary, personal history, and food critique. Her first book, Motherland, is scheduled to be published by Farrar, Straus and Giroux in 2023.

== Early life ==
Jiayang Fan was born in Chongqing, China in 1984. In 1986, her father went to the United States as a visiting scholar to study biology at Harvard. As a child, she lived with her mother in a residential complex in Chongqing's military zone. The complex was run-down, had no hot water, and had shared bathrooms, while the sole nearby convenience store served around 20,000 residents.

In 1992, she immigrated to the United States with her mother. They first settled in New Haven, Connecticut, while her father was at Yale University. Fan's mother found out that her father was having an affair. She subsequently divorced him, and was left unemployed with only 200 dollars. Fan and her mother briefly stayed with a family in East Haven to avoid being evicted. After some time, they moved to Greenwich, one of the most affluent towns in the United States. Fan's mother believed that living in a wealthy neighborhood would be necessary for her daughter to attend a good public school. To support the family, Fan's mother worked as a live-in housekeeper while making a plan for Fan's education.

Fan attended Greenwich Academy as the only Asian student in her year. At that time, she could barely speak English and was struck that the teacher and classmates' perceived her as an outsider. She spent a lot of time watching CCTV, the state channel of China, with her mother, at the house she worked. In 1998, she attended Deerfield Academy, a co-ed college-preparatory school in Deerfield, Massachusetts. She studied Philosophy and English at Williams College, an elite liberal arts college, and graduated in 2006. In a personal essay published in 2017, Fan said that even with greater familiarity with the English language and the American culture, she still felt like a "putative insider and perpetual outsider." Fan and her mother later moved to New York City. In the fall of 2011, Fan's 59-year-old mother was diagnosed with A.L.S., or amyotrophic lateral sclerosis, a progressive neurodegenerative disease that gradually paralyzes the patient. Her mother had since then frequently visited the ICU and once stayed in a nursing home. In 2014, Fan's mother was moved to the Henry J. Carter Speciality Hospital in Harlem, New York City.

Fan's mother died on January 12, 2022.

== Career ==
Jiayang Fan became a staff writer at The New Yorker in 2016. She was the first China-born staff reporter at the magazine, and became its third writer known for reporting on China, along with Peter Hessler and Evan Osnos. Her works include cultural and political commentary, personal history, and food critique. Before achieving staff writer status, her reporting on China, American politics, and culture had appeared in the magazine since 2010. Before becoming a staff writer, she also worked for the outlet as a fact-checker.

=== Interview with Cixin Liu ===
For a profile published in June 2019 in The New Yorker, Fan interviewed Chinese sci-fi writer Cixin Liu about the rise of China. In the writer's most-known fiction, The Three-Body Problem, which was published in the U.S. in 2014, he wrote about two fictional civilizations that are modeled after the U.S. and China, Fan wrote.

The interview was cited by five Republican U.S. senators in a letter to Netflix. In September 2020, then-Senator Marsha Blackburn (R‑TN) raised concerns over the streaming platform's decision to adapt and promote "The Three-Body Problem." Blackburn argued that Liu propagated the genocidal rhetorics regarding the Muslim Uyghurs and supported the Chinese's government's re-education camps. She wrote, "In an interview with the New Yorker last summer, when asked about the ongoing atrocities in XUAR, Mr. Liu stated… ‘If anything, the government is helping their economy and trying to lift them out of poverty…If you were to loosen up the country a bit, the consequences would be terrifying.’" The letter was signed by then-Senators Rick Scott (R‑FL), Kevin Cramer (R‑ND), Thom Tillis (R‑NC), and Martha McSally (R‑AZ).

Netflix responded to the letter that Liu's view does not reflect the view of Netflix or the show's creators, and they will not be part of the production or its themes.

In an article published by the Chinese online platform Sohu, Fan's interview was criticized as full of "leading questions" that intended to bring the topic to "the China threat theory," "but Liu smartly circled those questions".

=== Hong Kong Protests ===
Fan went to Hong Kong during the 2019 Anti-Extradition Amendment Bill Movement as a reporter for The New Yorker. She joined the rally and offered saline solution for those who were attacked by the police with tear gas.

Jiayang Fan
(@JiayangFan)
tweeted:

I brought saline solution for protesters if they r gassed. But I'm afraid to go to frontline until my white friends arrive so I can have legitimacy in their eyes. I'm not angry, I just wish the frontliners would have the saline solution I brought for them in case they get hurt.

Sep 21, 2019

In a tweet she sent during the protest, Fan said that protestors questioned her identity and motivation because she spoke Mandarin. Fan had to show her press identification, passport, and business ID to prove that she was a reporter from the United States. Along with a video she posted, Fan wrote, "my Chinese face is a liability." She also said that she had to wait for other white reporters to come so that she could go to the frontline with "legitimacy". In her story published in December 2019, she voiced her support for anti-Beijing protestors.

Jiayang Fan
(@JiayangFan)
tweeted:

My Chinese face is a liability. Just got asked if I'm from the US and am reporter why I have Chinese face. I showed press identification, passport, business iID . “But why I speak mandarin?” Old man asks hostilely. And I'm surrounded by huge mob. Are you really from west? I'm asked.

Sep 21, 2019

Her comments caused mainland Chinese to attack her on the internet, accusing her as a traitor to China. Some Hongkongers also criticized her for not fully supporting the protestors in her story, which recorded discrimination that Mandarin speakers faced in Hong Kong as well as violent acts of protestors.

=== Food critique ===
When Fan worked for The New Yorker as a fact-checker, she had the opportunity to visit restaurants in New York City; that was when she started to write food critique for the magazine. Her writings include Salon de Ning, a high-end Shanghai-style rooftop bar in the Peninsula New York, Sichuan restaurant Málà Project, and California-Mediterranean composite Covina. In NYMag's food section Grub Street Diet, Fan wrote about a food diary where she recounted that "food is our language" between her mother and her.

=== COVID-19 controversy ===
In March 2020, during the start of the global COVID-19 pandemic, Fan and mother became the target of Chinese nationalists.

In early March, the Henry J. Carter Speciality Hospital closed to visitors per state policy regarding COVID-19. Meanwhile, the two health aides who had been taking care of Fan's mother were not permitted to stay in the facility. Upon learning that a few positive COVID-19 cases were found in the hospital, Fan called the hospital's nurse station and the Patient Relations Department, while not receiving a response on what protective measure is taken to prevent patients from contracting the virus.

After a nurse facilitated a brief FaceTime call between Fan and her mother in early April, weeks since the COVID-19 lockdown and visitor ban started, Fan decided to seek help on Twitter. She tweeted with a screenshot of the FaceTime video and mentioned Mitchell Katz, the president of New York City Health and Hospitals:

Jiayang Fan [@JiayangFan] (April 9, 2020). ".@DrKatzNYCHH this is last photo of my last vid call w my mom who is sobbing as hospital police drag out my moms crying aside. Henry j carter patient relations lied to me entire day abt state of her discharge until last min. Moms nurses collectively anguished for her" (Tweet) – via Twitter.

The next morning, Carter's Patient Relations department called Fan for a Zoom conference, where the hospital's medical director and the head of Patient Relations informed her that her mother's aide would be allowed to come back to the hospital.

"There was no real explanation, but my impromptu Twitter campaign had borne fruit. And, I had to admit, so did my association with this magazine. Was this how power worked?" Fan reflected in her essay.

==== Chinese Internet response ====
The day after her mother's aide returned to the hospital, Fan received a Twitter private message telling her that she was being targeted on Weibo, a Chinese social media platform. She had received malicious threats on her and her mother's life: “I never know what happiness is until I see your sobbing bitch face”; “Authoritarianism rescues the injured and saves life: democracy takes the life of your bitch mother.” “Brownnosers will brownnose until they have nothing,” Fan quoted in her essay.

A WeChat Chinese-language publication, College Daily (Chinese: 留学生日报), published a letter titled "College Daily is willing to send you a ventilator," after Fan's twitter received attention on the Chinese internet. The letter criticized the "non-behaving American politicians" who led to the COVID-19 outbreak in the U.S., and made reference to Fan's previous reporting on Cixin Liu. The letter said that, the fact that Fan made the analogy between Earth-Trisolaris in The Three-Body Problem and China-U.S. is "not worth commenting" and reflective of her view on China and U.S.-China relations. It also pointed out that China sending ventilators to the U.S. during the COVID-19 pandemic is as "absurd" as Earth sending supports to Trisolaris.

In August 2019, The New Yorker published a story about College Daily, calling it a "post-truth" publication where Chinese students in the U.S. receive their news. In the letter to Fan College Daily said that while The New Yorker editorial board ignored their "reasonable request for taking down the story," they still decided to send ventilators to Fan in the principle of humanitarianism. It was an attempt to "combat evil with kindness," the publication wrote.

As Fan received threats on Twitter, Facebook, and Instagram, Fan's family in China also faced harassment.

In an interview with New Yorker executive editor Dorothy Wickenden, Fan said that she became the target because of the ongoing, intensifying social media war between U.S. and China, while her story existed at the intersection of anti-America sentiment and nationalistic feelings that Chinese people have. "The fact that I had covered the Hong Kong protests, not too long ago and have written stories about China that was not purely congratulatory, I think that's upsetting and considered a betrayed by many Chinese living in China," Fan said in the interview.

A study conducted by the Australian Strategic Policy Institute (ASPI) found out that Fan, and other journalists and China analysts of female and ethnic Chinese heritage were targets of an ongoing, coordinated and large-scale online information campaign on Twitter led by a pro-Chinese Communist Party network known as Spamouflage. It involved inauthentic Twitter accounts engaging in online harassment against the journalists by issuing threats of violence and racial insults, and spreading accusations of being a traitor.

=== The Asian-American ===
In her 2022 and 2021 The New Yorker articles, Fan talks about Asian American women starting self-defense classes in response to the anti-Asian racism in the United States and discussed the surge in violence against Asian Americans, and why women are a particular target.

She also analyzed the reasons why Asian Americans feel powerless in the battle over elite high schools in New York.

== Bibliography ==
- "The dilemmas, moral and financial, of buying books in Shanghai". Page-Turner. The New Yorker. June 28, 2010. (Note: Available on website only.)
- "Turkish Delight". Page-Turner. The New Yorker. July 15, 2010.
- "Puffy's Tavern". Goings on About Town. Bar Tab. The New Yorker. 91 (20): 15. July 20, 2015.
- "Mother's Ruin". Goings on About Town. Bar Tab. The New Yorker. 91 (45): 16. January 25, 2016. (Note: Title in the online table of contents is "The provocative improvisation of Mother’s Ruin".)
- "The golden generation : why China's super-rich send their children abroad". Annals of Wealth. The New Yorker. 92 (2): 30–35. February 22, 2016. (Note: Title in the online table of contents is "China’s rich kids head West".)
- "Covina". Goings on About Town. Tables for Two. The New Yorker. 92 (22): 13. July 25, 2016. (Note: Online version is titled "Covina's simple pleasures".)
- "Beauty is Justice : Meitu's apps are remaking China's rising generation, one face at a time". Annals of Technology. The New Yorker. 93 (50): 52–59. December 11, 2017. (Note: Title in the online table of contents is "China’s Selfie Obsession: Meitu’s apps are changing what it means to be beautiful in the most populous country on earth.".)
- "The war of the worlds : a leading sci–fi writer takes stock of China's global rise". Profiles. The New Yorker. 95 (17): 28–35. June 24, 2019. (Note: Online version is titled "Liu Cixin’s war of the worlds".)
- "Little Mad". Goings on About Town. Tables for Two. The New Yorker. 97 (27): 11. September 6, 2021. (Note: Online version is titled "A boldness of vision at Little Mad".)
- "CheLi". Goings on About Town. Tables for Two. The New Yorker. 97 (30): 18. September 27, 2021. (Note: Online version is titled "Chinese dishes from fertile Jiangnan, at CheLi".)
- "Gugu Room, 143 Orchard St". Goings on About Town. Tables for Two. The New Yorker. 98 (28): 11. September 12, 2022. (Note: Online version is titled "The more-is-more pizzazz of Gugu Room".)
- Motherland. Farrar, Straus and Giroux. Forthcoming.

———————
