= Cotton Club Boys =

Cotton Club Boys may refer to:

- Cotton Club Boys (chorus line), a chorus line of the Cotton Club that debuted 1934 and flourished through 1942
- Cotton Club Boys (territory band), a traveling swing band from the 1930s initially fronted by Anna Mae Winburn
- Cotton Club Boys (Cab Calloway's band), a nickname for Cab Calloway's band when it was the Cotton Club's house band – before the chorus line of the same name was established
- Cotton Club boys (4-H), part of 4-H (an agricultural oriented youth organization) that began around 1912 in the U.S.; i.e., in North America, the southern version of 4-H Corn Club boys
