= Helene Fuld Health Trust =

American charitable trust

- Founders: Leonhard Felix Fuld (1883–1965); Florentine Minnie Fuld (1878–1956) (brother and sister)
- Tax ID no.: 13-6309307
- Location(s): c/o HSBC Bank USA; 95 Washington Street; Atrium 1N; Buffalo, New York; 14203-2885
- Coordinates: 42.876389°N 78.876183°W
- Owner: HSBC Bank USA, Trustee
- Endowment: $107,267,101 (2015, net assets)
- Formerly called: Helene Fuld Health Foundation

The Helene Fuld Health Trust is the largest charitable trust in the United States devoted exclusively to supporting student nurses and nursing education. The trust — which began as a foundation in 1935, but transferred its assets to the trust in 1969 — has provided grants, scholarships, and financial aid for the education, health, and welfare of student nurses. (Note: "In Big Banks' Hands, Trusts Often Give Fewer Grants – Donors Gone, Trusts Veer From Their Wishes", by Stephanie Strom, The New York Times, September 29, 2007)

== History ==
The story of the Helene Fuld Health Trust has three parts: (i) the Estate of Helene Fuld, who died in 1923, (ii) the Helene Fuld Health Foundation, which ran from 1935 to 1969, and (iii) the creation of the Helene Fuld Health Trust in 1969.

=== Estate ===
Helene Fuld, through probate proceedings following her death in 1923 (i.e., under the auspices of the Estate of Helene Fuld, Deceased), devised $91,718 to her two children. Her husband (and father of her two children), Bernhard Fuld (1843–1918), had already died. Her children, Leonhard Felix Fuld (1883–1965) and Florentine Minnie Fuld (1878–1956), as devisees under her estate, shared the inheritance equally.

=== Foundation ===
In 1935, Leonhard Felix Fuld, LLM, PhD, and Florentine Minnie Fuld established the Helene Fuld Health Foundation, each contributing $5,000 in honor of their mother, Helene Fuld (née Helene Schwab; 1858–1923), who had been a health care and educationadvocate.

The Helene Fuld Health Foundation assets grew – from $4.8 million in 1952 to more than $35 million in 1965. In 1961, Fuld — desirous that the foundation continue after his death or incapacity — structured a succession plan that would eventually transfer the assets to a charitable trust named the Helene Fuld Health Trust.

In 1950, the foundation's address was 8 Baldwin Avenue, Jersey City, New Jersey.

=== Charitable trust ===
Leonhard Fuld died in 1965. Four years later, in 1969, the Foundation was dissolved according to Fuld's instructions, and the foundation assets – around $25 million – were transferred into the Helene Fuld Health Trust that had been created in 1950. The trust, in 1969, was managed by Marine Midland Bank, of Buffalo, as sole trustee. Marine Midland, was acquired by HSBC Bank USA in 1980 and changed its name to HSBC Bank USA in 1999.

== Helene Fuld Health Foundation benefactors ==
Leonhard Felix Fuld was born in Manhattan in 1883. Growing up, Leonhard attended Public School 57 (on 115th Street, near Lexington), Public School 83, and for high school, the Horace Mann School (located first at 9 University Place in Greenwich Village, then, in his senior year in Morningside Heights at Teachers College. In higher education, he studied at Columbia University from about 1902 to 1909, earning five degrees: (i) a Bachelor of Arts in 1903 (completing his studies in just 1 year), (ii) a Master of Arts in 1904, (iii) a Bachelor of Laws in 1905, (iv) a Master of Laws in 1906, and (v) a PhD in Sociology and Political Economy (dissertation: "Police Administration," 1,100 pages) in 1909. He went on to become an editor, an Examiner for the New York State Civil Service Commission and police security analyst, but his lifelong passion was public health and sanitation. For much of Leonhard's life, he lived with his sister in Manhattan in a tenement at 130 East 110th Street, between Park and Lexington Avenues. He lived much of his life as a recluse.

Florentine Minnie Fuld was born in Manhattan in 1878. She had been a primary school teacher. Florentine Minnie Fuld died in 1956 of malnutrition at the Hospital for Joint Diseases, to which her brother had given money. Before she died, she said that she had not left her house in 9 years.

Leonhard Fuld died in 1965 at the Helene Fuld Hospital in Trenton, now known as the Capital Health Regional Medical Center. (Note: "Dr. Leonhard Fuld, 82, Dies; Multimillionaire Philanthropist — Self-Made Man Who Lived Alone Gave Millions, Mostly for Nurses," The New York Times, September 1, 1965)

== Selected executives ==
- 1960s to about 1985: Gordon Alexander Philips (1917–1991) became a co-trustee of the Helene Fuld Health Foundation after the death of Leonhard Felix Fuld in 1965. In 1969, he became the President of the Helene Fuld Health Trust, a position he held until about 1971. He had served as legal counsel for the foundation in the early 1960s and in 1969, when the trust was founded, also served as legal counsel. Around that time, the trust was supporting about 170 nursing school in the United States and abroad. Philips was also the Corporate Secretary for the Helene Fuld School of Nursing in Trenton. He was also an attorney for the Helene Fuld Hospital in Trenton. Philips had also served on the New Jersey Board of Nursing for five years. He is also had been an FBI agent and municipal court judge. Philips retired in 1985. In his early days, he had attended Rutgers University and, in 1939, graduated from Wake Forest University School of Law.

== Selected beneficiaries ==
- Helene Fuld College of Nursing, New York, founded 1945, has been a beneficiary of the Foundation and Trust since 1955, primarily from grants for (a) scholarships, (b) building renovations, and (c) equipment.
- The Helene Fuld School of Nursing in Trenton, New Jersey, was founded in 1895 as "Training School for Nurses" at Trenton City Hospital. The hospital and school changed their names in 1902 to William McKinley Memorial Hospital and William McKinley Memorial Hospital School of Nursing. In 1951 school changed its name to Helene Fuld School of Nursing, honoring the mother of its benefactor, Leonhard Felix Fuld – the same benefactor as the Helene College of Nursing in New York City. The Trenton school closed in 2011, citing, among other things, changes in nursing education. (Note: "Final Nursing Class Graduates as Helene Fuld School of Nursing Closes", Trish Adkins, Gloucester Township Patch (Patch Media), December 17, 2011) The Trenton school was not related to the New York school.
- Coppin State University, College of Health Professions, Helene Fuld School of Nursing in Baltimore was founded in 1973 and, as of 2017, offers baccalaureate degrees for RN, BSN, accelerated BSN, and a graduate program that began in fall 1999. The School offers a Master of Science in Nursing (MSN) and a post-masters certification track with a Family Nurse Practitioner (FNP) role concentration. From 1963 to 1973, it was known as the Helene Fuld School of Nursing at Provident Hospital. At its founding in 1895, it was named the Provident Hospital Training School of Nursing. Luci V. Ashton (1870–1948), (Note: Luci V. Ashton (née Lucinda V. Ashton; 1870–1948) had been married to and divorced from the Rev. Reginald Grant Barrow (1889–1980). His son (and her stepson), Errol Walton Barrow (1920–1987) became the first Prime Minister of Barbados in 1961. His daughter (and her stepdaughter), Ruth Nita Barrow became the first and, as of 2017, only female Governor-General of Barbados. (Notable Caribbeans and Caribbean Americans: A Biographical Dictionary, by Serafín Mendez Mendez, Gail Cueto, Neysa Rodríguez Deynes, Greenwood Press, 2003, pps. 36–41; OCLC 70916055)) who graduated from Freedmen's Hospital Training School for Nurses in 1895, served as the school's first director for a year and a half before becoming Superintendent of Nurses at Douglass Hospital in Kansas City, Kansas. The Baltimore school is not related to the New York School.
- Columbia University School of Nursing, in its new building scheduled to open in 2017, features the Helene Fuld Health Trust Simulation Center, which occupies two floors, spanning 16,000 square feet. The Center features a highly technical simulation labs ("state of the art," according to Columbia officials) that mimic hospital patient and operating rooms.

== Publications ==
- "Health Decalogue for Student Nurses," by Leonhard Felix Fuld, Helene Fuld Health Foundation (© 10 May 1954)
- Papers, 1884-1987; OCLC 70940720
  - Correspondence, diplomas, publications, clippings, and photographs of/or relating to Fuld. Includes materials concerning the Helene Fuld Health Foundation (later Helene Fuld Health Trust), established in 1935 by Fuld and his sister, Florentine Minnie Fuld; the William McKinley Memorial Hospital in Trenton and its school of nursing (later succeeded by Helene Fuld Hospital, Helene Fuld Medical Center, and Helene Fuld School of Nursing); correspondence from Fuld to the hospital attorney, Gordon A. Philips, relating to visits to Trenton and gifts to the hospital and its nursing school; documents regarding Florentine Fuld; and photographs of Fuld and other family members.
- Journal of the Helene Fuld Health Foundation, July 1945 (Issue No. 1) – February 1965 (Issue No. 438), Leonhard Felix Fuld, editor; OCLC 50376544, 50376550
  - Note: The Journal was published irregularly, initially monthly, but sometimes weekly; one issue each year contained the foundation's "Annual Report" (OCLC 43704389)
  - Selected articles
  - "Going Through Life on 'High,'" Leonhard Felix Fuld (ed.), No. 95, August 1951
  - "Helene Fuld Health Trust," Issue No. 97, September 1951
  - "Health Provisions in the Bible," by Joel Wittstein, Issue No. 264 (issue month not known) 1959; OCLC 173001142
  - "Helene Fuld Health Trust (2nd amended agreement), Issue No. 295, October 5, 1960
  - "Helene Fuld Health Trust (3rd amended agreement), Issue No. 330, June 23, 1961
  - Issues featuring nurses uniforms from around the world (Note: In the 1940s and 50s, when the United Nations and the World Health Organization were new, an organization called the Helene Fuld Health Foundation, dedicated to the "relief of poverty, suffering, sickness and distress," collected a series of photographs of student nurses from countries all over the world. In this period the nurses' uniform was an important symbol of the professionalization of nursing and the nurses' commitment to humanitarian values. Excerpt from: "Black Student Nurses Around the World" By Alexsandra Mitchell National Institutes of Health Office of Extramural Research February 18, 2014 OCLC 5708320339)
  - Photographs of American Wearing Foreign Nurse Uniforms,‡ Issue No. 112 (issue month not known) 1952
  - Photographs of American Wearing Foreign Nurse Uniforms,‡ Issue No. 115 (issue month not known) 1952
  - Photographs of American Wearing Foreign Nurse Uniforms,‡ Issue No. 117, October 1952
  - "Student Nurses of One Hundred Countries,"‡ Issue No. 128, April 1953
  - Photographs of American Wearing Foreign Nurse Uniforms,‡ Issue No. 328, August 1961; OCLC 760270733
  - Photographs of American Wearing Foreign Nurse Uniforms,‡ Issue No. 376, July 1963; OCLC 760270733
  - Photographs of American Wearing Foreign Nurse Uniforms,‡ Issue No. 392, December 1963; OCLC 760270733
‡ Hand-colored black & white photographs published over the course of several years of American student nurses wearing some of the one hundred sixty-one foreign nurse uniforms on public display in the clinical conference room of Helene Fuld School of Nursing in Trenton, New Jersey. Seventy-five of the plates are archived at the United States National Library of Medicine (OCLC 14651741)
