= Helene Fuld College of Nursing =

Private nursing school in New York City

- Former names: Helene Fuld School of Nursing (1964–1996), Helene Fuld School of Practical Nursing (1955–1964), Hospital for Joint Diseases School of Practical Nursing (1945–1955)
- Type: Private nursing school
- Established: 1945
- President: Joyce P. Griffin-Sobel
- Academic staff: 30
- Location: New York, New York, United States; 40°48′09″N 73°56′36″W
- Campus: Urban, commuter
- Colors: Blue, Green, Purple, Black
- Website: www.helenefuld.edu

Helene Fuld College of Nursing is a private nursing school in New York City. The college offers associate and comprehensive baccalaureate science degrees to Licensed Practical Nurses, Registered Nurses, and individuals who are not already nurses. The college is located in the East Harlem section of Manhattan in the Mount Morris Park Historic District across from Marcus Garvey Park. It was founded in 1945.

== History ==
=== Constituent school of the Hospital for Joint Diseases ===
A school of nursing was founded October 15, 1945, by New York City's Hospital for Joint Diseases, offering a one-year curriculum leading to becoming a Licensed Practical Nurse. Its inaugural class graduated October 29, 1946. By 1950, the program was named "Hospital for Joint Diseases School of Practical Nursing".

The school, in 1955, received a grant from the Helene Fuld Health Foundation and was subsequently named the "Helene Fuld School of Practical Nursing".

In 1964, under the leadership of Justine Hannan, RN, Director of Nursing Services and Nursing Education, the school launched the first program in the country to offer licensed practical nurses an accredited curriculum in higher education leading to a degree as a Registered nurse. In 1973, Mary Ahl-Heugel (née Mary Ellen Ahl; born 1918), became Director of Nursing Education. In 1976, the school received a permanent charter from New York State with the authority to confer the associate degrees in Applied Science with a nursing concentration, becoming one of the first hospital-based schools in New York State to offer the associate degree.

In 1978, the school phased out its practical nurse program. The last class of about 300 in practical nursing graduated in October 1978.

In 1979 the Hospital for Joint Diseases relocated downtown on East 17th Street and a new, private, non-profit corporation named "Joint Diseases North General Hospital" became the new tenant at 1919 Madison Avenue location in East Harlem. Helene Fuld College of Nursing had been, since October 15, 1945, a New York State Registered Nursing School.

=== Constituent college of North General Hospital ===
In 1980, Margaret Wines became Dean. In 1981, the school's associate degree program became the first such hospital program to be accredited by the National League for Nursing. On October 27, 1987, the hospital was renamed North General Hospital. In 1988, the school became the first hospital-based nursing school to become accredited by the Middle States Commission on Higher Education.

On December 12, 1991, North General Hospital moved into a newly built, modern facility at 1879 Madison Avenue, between 120th and 121st Streets, two blocks south of its old location. (Note: "At North General, Moving a Whole Hospital, One Patient at a Time", by Lisa Belkin, The New York Times, December 12, 1991) In 1992, the Helene Fuld School of Nursing moved into its current location at 24 East 120th Street, New York.

In February 1996, with the permission of the Board of Regents of the University of the State of New York, the name "Helene Fuld School of Nursing" was changed to "Helene Fuld College of Nursing", reflecting the depth and breadth its curricular programs in higher education.

=== Independent college ===
In July 2007, the college separated from North General hospital and amended its charter with the New York State Board of Regents as an independent not-for-profit college. North General Hospital – its former parent institution – closed July 2, 2010, and filed for Chapter 11 bankruptcy. In 2012, Wendy Robinson became president of the college and the New York State Education Department authorized the college to confer Bachelor of Science degrees for registered nurses.

=== Colors ===
The college uses blue, green, purple, and black in its publications. Moreover, the interior design color palette of the college's main reception area uses those colors. With the exception of black, nurses commonly wear scrubs in those colors. Since 2010, there has been a growing trend for hospitals and health care organizations to assign scrub color codes to help identify healthcare professional by discipline or department. Color coded uniforms, however, have been widely criticized by healthcare workers for various reasons, one being that it cultivates a caste mentality in an environment that requires teamwork across all disciplines. In any event, the colors at the college do not represent a particular discipline or academic level.

== Academics ==
The college offers three programs:

1. A program for licensed practical nurses who want to earn a degree with a major in nursing at the registered nurse level.
2. A program for registered nurses with associate degrees who want to earn a baccalaureate degree with a major in nursing.
3. A program for individuals with no prior nursing degree who want to earn a baccalaureate degree with a major in nursing.

=== Enrollment ===
As of 2019, there were approximately 600 full- and part-time students enrolled in the associate degree and baccalaureate programs.

=== Academic calendar ===
The Helene Fuld College of Nursing follows the quarter system.

=== Charter and registration ===
- The college holds a permanent charter from the Board of Regents of the University of the State of New York authorizing it to grant Associate in Applied Science and Bachelor of Science degrees.
- The college is registered by the New York State Education Department, Office of the Professions, located in Albany at the State Education Building.

=== Accreditation ===
- The college is accredited by the Middle States Commission on Higher Education (MSCHE)
- The associate degree nursing program is accredited by the Accreditation Commission for Education in Nursing, Inc. (ACEN)
- The upper division baccalaureate program (RN to BS) is accredited by the Commission on Collegiate Nursing Education (CCNE)

=== Rankings ===
In 2017, the college was ranked 1st in "Best Community & Career Colleges by Salary Potential" in the "College Salary Report – 2017-18 Full List of 2-Year Schools," by PayScale.

== Campus ==
=== College building ===
The college, since 1992, and as of 2017, occupies 34,000 square feet (3,200 m^{2}) on the third and fourth floors of a wing owned by Bethel Gospel Assembly Church, an evangelical church. The college is not affiliated with the church. The classroom facilities, reportedly, are well equipped. But the building – particularly the entrance – has a no-frills, unassuming, utilitarian appearance. As was the case with North General Hospital, the decision to remain in the neighborhood represents a civic commitment to Harlem.

=== Neighborhood ===
The immediate neighborhood, until about 1992, had been blighted. This was the case with many neighborhoods and districts throughout the five boroughs. In 1992, when North General Hospital moved into its new quarters two blocks south, Maple Plaza, an eight-story, 155-unit residential co-op, designated for affordable housing, was built in its place at 1919 Madison Avenue. Maple Plaza was developed in the 1990s under a plan by the city and North General Hospital to revive the area around the hospital. Eugene Louis McCabe (1937–1998), President and CEO of North General Hospital from its inception in 1979 until his death in 1998, was a strong advocate of developing Maple Plaza. Maple Court, another similar project in the area with 135 units, was completed before Maple Plaza. Since then, the area around Marcus Garvey Park has developed. The neighborhood is no longer blighted. While gentrification is typically criticized by civic leaders for making neighborhoods unaffordable – particularly to those who, for generations have thrived and lived there – the neighborhood surrounding Marcus Garvey Park, by design, offers a mix of affordable housing. At the same time, adjusting to gentrification throughout Harlem is an ongoing concern of policy makers, citizens, civic leaders, and religious leaders.

Two blocks west of the college, in the Mount Morris Park Historic District, there has been considerable recent (since 2000) residential development and restoration. The stretch of 122nd Street between Mount Morris Park West and Malcolm X Boulevard (aka Sixth Avenue and Lenox Avenue) is known as "Doctors' Row". (Note: "Can Harlem's Heritage Be Saved? Many Jewels of Its Vibrant Past Are Gone. Now Some Residents Are Fighting to Landmark the Rest," by Nina Siegal, New York Times, February 7, 1999) As has been the case in many neighborhoods throughout the five boroughs, old, historic residential buildings, including brownstones, fell into disrepair. (Note: "'Ruins' Reclaimed – Restorers Anticipate Revival of Once Tony Brownstones," by Tracie Rozhon, New York Times Service, Chicago Tribune, June 21, 1998) Until around 1999, on Mount Morris Park West, between 120 and 121st Streets, there was a row of brownstones, built around 1885, which, according to the New York Times, were so deteriorated that they came to be known as "The "Ruins". That row has been completely rebuilt into luxury condominiums that were initially priced for mixed income buyers. (Note: "Harlem Homeowners Exult at Neighborhood Prison's Closing," by Amy Waldman, New York Times, September 22, 1999) Revitalization since the 1990s has occurred in many neighborhoods, including the Mount Morris Park Historic District, notably brownstones, and in particular the brownstones at 4, 6, 8, 10, 12, 14, and 16 West 122nd Street, on the south side of the street, which date back to 1888 and 1889. Those particular brownstones were designed by William Tuthill. St. Martin's Episcopal Church, featuring a tower that houses the city's second largest carillon (40 bells), is at 18 West 122nd Street – at the corner of Malcolm X Boulevard. It is a New York City Designated Landmark.

"Fifth on the Park," Harlem's first Upper East Side-style high-rise condominium tower is one block east from the college, at the southeast corner of 120th Street and Fifth Avenue – at 1485 Fifth Avenue. Its architects are FxFowle. The tower, 28 stories, 26 of which are residential, includes a 38,000 square foot (3,500 m^{2}) church with a four-story, 1,800-seat sanctuary for the Bethel Gospel Assembly, who sold the development rights for a full block. There are 194 residences, of which 47 are church-owned affordable rental apartments, and 147 are market-rate condominiums. The spa includes a 55-foot (16.76 m) lap pool.

== Other schools by the same name ==
- The Helene Fuld School of Nursing in Trenton, New Jersey, was founded in 1895 as "Training School for Nurses" at Trenton City Hospital. The hospital and school changed their names in 1902 to William McKinley Memorial Hospital and William McKinley Memorial Hospital School of Nursing. In 1951 school changed its name to Helene Fuld School of Nursing, honoring the mother of its benefactor, Leonhard Felix Fuld – the same benefactor as the Helene College of Nursing in New York City. The Trenton school closed in 2011, citing, among other things, changes in nursing education. (Note: "Final Nursing Class Graduates as Helene Fuld School of Nursing Closes", Trish Adkins, Gloucester Township Patch (Patch Media), December 17, 2011) The Trenton school was not related to the New York school.
- Coppin State University, College of Health Professions, Helene Fuld School of Nursing in Baltimore was founded in 1973 and, as of 2017, offers baccalaureate degrees for RN, BSN, accelerated BSN, and a graduate program that began in fall 1999. The School offers a Master of Science in Nursing (MSN) and a post-masters certification track with a Family Nurse Practitioner (FNP) role concentration. From 1963 to 1973, it was known as the Helene Fuld School of Nursing at Provident Hospital. At its founding in 1895, it was named the Provident Hospital Training School of Nursing. Luci V. Ashton (1870–1948), (Note: Luci V. Ashton (née Lucinda V. Ashton; 1870–1948) had been married to and divorced from the Rev. Reginald Grant Barrow (1889–1980). His son (and her stepson), Errol Walton Barrow (1920–1987) became the first Prime Minister of Barbados in 1961. His daughter (and her stepdaughter), Ruth Nita Barrow became the first and, as of 2017, only female Governor-General of Barbados. (Notable Caribbeans and Caribbean Americans: A Biographical Dictionary, by Serafín Mendez Mendez, Gail Cueto, Neysa Rodríguez Deynes, Greenwood Press, 2003, pps. 36–41; OCLC 70916055)) who graduated from Freedmen's Hospital Training School for Nurses in 1895, served as the school's first director for a year and a half before becoming Superintendent of Nurses at Douglass Hospital in Kansas City, Kansas. The Baltimore school is not related to the New York School.

== Notes and references ==
=== General ===
- Leonhard Felix Fuld archives at the Helene Fuld School of Nursing, Trenton; OCLC 39184568

Also at University of Pennsylvania, Leonhard Felix Fuld archives

- "Fruenthal Family History, Starting in 1849, in Wilkes-Barre, Pennsylvania, with Samuel and Henry Frauenthal, owners of S. Frauenthal Boots & Shoes" (video); interviewee: James C. Frauenthal, Trustee of the Helene Fuld College of Nursing; interviewer: Michael Roy Stoler (born 1947); Building New York: New York Stories, (BUNY12010), CUNY TV, taped November 15, 2016 (alternate link via YouTube)
