= Michael Palese =

American urologist

Michael A. Palese
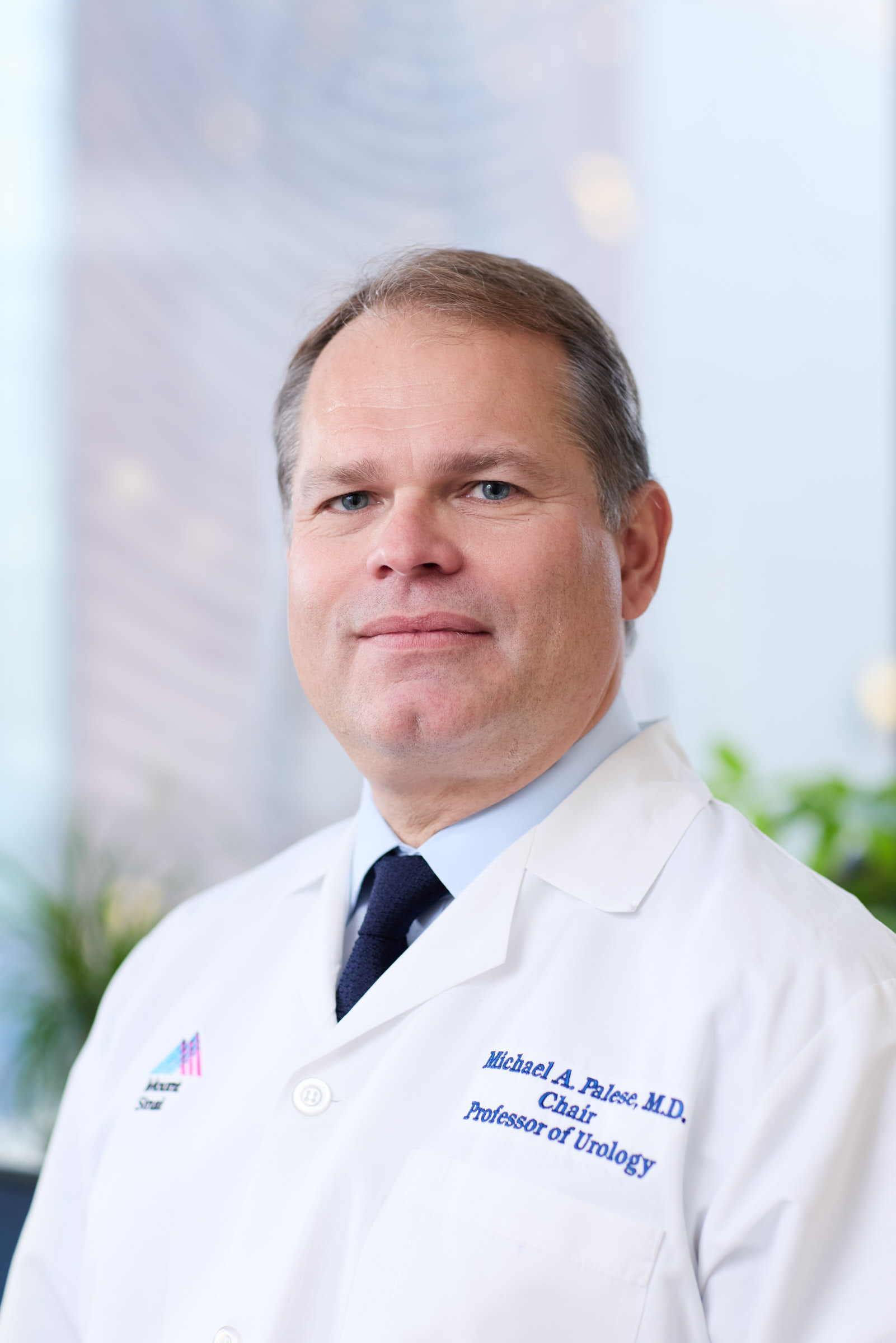
- Portrait of Michael A. Palese M.D., photographed by Julian Walter, used with permission. Licensed under CC BY 4.0.
- Education: Cornell University; Mount Sinai School of Medicine
- Medical career
- Profession: Urologist
- Institutions: Mount Sinai Medical Center; Mount Sinai Beth Israel
- Sub-specialties: Kidney cancer Kidney stones Minimally Invasive Surgery; Robotic Surgery

Dr. Michael A. Palese, is an American urologist specializing in robotic, laparoscopic and endoscopic surgery, with a special emphasis on robotic surgeries relating to kidney cancer,kidney stone disease and benign prostatic hyperplasia (BPH).

Palese is the Chairman of the Department of Urology at the Mount Downtown. He is Vice Chairman of operations for the department of urology at the Mount Sinai Health System He is a professor at the Icahn School of Medicine at Mount Sinai in New York City. He is also the Director of Minimally Invasive Surgery for the Mount Sinai Health System and specializes in robotic, laparoscopic and endoscopic surgery.

As a board-certified urologist and fellowship-trained surgeon, Palese specializes in the diagnosis and treatment of kidney, ureter, adrenal, bladder and prostate disease.

Palese performed the first robotic radical nephrectomy, robotic partial nephrectomy, robotic donor nephrectomy, robotic nephroureterectomy, robotic adrenalectomy, and robotic ureteral reimplant & reconstruction at the Mount Sinai Medical Center in New York City. He holds several patents for the design of novel surgical devices. He pioneered Single Port (SP) Robotic Donor Nephrectomy surgery and performed the world’s first procedrure in 2019.

Palese has been included in the Castle Connolly's List of America's "Top Doctors" every year from 2010 to 2026 and The New York Times publication of "Superdoctors" every year from 2009 to 2026.

== Biography ==
Palese graduated from Cornell University in 1993 with a double major degree as well as a minor degree in Human Biology. He received his medical degree from the Mount Sinai School of Medicine in 1997. He completed his general surgery and urology residency at the University of Maryland Medical Center and performed research at the Johns Hopkins Hospital, where he was a research resident. He finished a fellowship in robotic and laparoscopic surgery at Weill Cornell Medical College of Cornell University in 2004.

In 2004, Palese joined Mount Sinai Medical Center where he established the robotic surgery program for the Department of Urology. He served as the Chief of Urology at the North General Hospital in New York City from 2004 to 2008.

Palese is on the Medical Advisory Board of the National Kidney Foundation of Greater New York and as a consultant for The Journal of Urology. He is on the steering committee for the Initiative on Kidney Cancer (sponsored by the National Kidney Foundation) and serves on the Medical Advisory Board to the New York Giants. He is a member of the American Medical Association, the American Urological Association, the New York section of the American Urological Association, and the Society of Laparoscopic Surgeons (SLS).

== Board Certification ==
American Board of Urology

== Honors and awards ==
- America's Top Doctor: Castle Connolly Medical LTD - 2025 (24th Edition), 2024(23rd Edition), 2023 (22nd Edition), 2022 (21st Edition), 2021 (20th Edition), 2020 (19th Edition), 2019 (17th Edition), 2018 (16th Edition), 2017 (15th Edition), 2016 (14th Edition), 2015 (14th Edition), 2014 (13th Edition)
- America's Top Doctor for Cancer: Castle Connolly Medical LTD - 2025(20th Edition), 2024(19th Edition), 2023 (18th Edition), 2022 (17th Edition), 2021(16th Edition), 2020 (15th Edition), 2019 (14th Edition), 2018 (13th Edition), 2017 (12th Edition), 2016 (11th Edition), 2015 (10th Edition), 2014 (9th Edition)
- Super Doctors of New York (The New York Times) -2026, 2025, 2024, 2023, 2022, 2021, 2020, 2019, 2018, 2017, 2016, 2015, 2014, 2013, 2012, 2011, 2010, 2009
- New York Magazine: Top Doctors -2025, 2024, 2023, 2022, 2021, 2020, 2019, 2018, 2017, 2016, 2015, 2014, 2013, 2012, 2011*New York Metro Area Top Doctor: Castle Connolly Medical LTD - 2025 (28th Edition), 2024 (27th Edition), 2023 (26th Edition), 2022 (25th Edition), 2021 (22nd Edition), 2020 (23rd Edition), 2019 (22nd Edition), 2018 (21st Edition), 2017 (20th Edition), 2016 (19th Edition), 2015 (18th Edition), 2014 (17th Edition), 2013 (16th Edition), 2012 (15th Edition), 2011 (14th Edition), 2010 (13th Edition)
- Guide to America's Top Surgeon -2025, 2024, 2023, 2022, 2021, 2020, 2019, 2018, 2017, 2016, 2015, 2014, 2013, 2012, 2011, 2010, 2009, 2008, 2007
- Best Doctors in America -2026, 2025, 2024, 2023, 2022, 2021, 2020, 2019, 2018, 2017, 2016, 2015, 2014, 2013, 2012, 2011, 2010, 2009, 2008, 2007, 2006, 2005
- Best Urology Video: Society of Laparoscopic & Robotic Surgeons 2023
- Saul Horowitz Jr. Award 2021
- Cornell University Extern Program Sponsor 2008-2018
- Best Video/Multispecialty: Society of Laparoendoscopic Surgeons (SLS) 2014
- Best Video/Urology: Society of Laparoendoscopic Surgeons (SLS) 2014
- Best Poster Presentation: Society of Laparoendoscopic Surgeons (SLS) 2014
- Best Video/Multispecialty: Society of Laparoendoscopic Surgeons (SLS) 2012
- Best Reviewer Award - Journal of Urology (Kidney Section) 2011
- Best Video/ Urology: Society of Laparoendoscopic Surgeons (SLS) 2005
- Fellow; American College of Surgeons (ACS) 2004
- Resident Achievement Award: Society of Laparoendoscopic Surgeons (SLS) 2003
- Pfizer Scholar Award and Grant 2003
- Gerald P. Murphy Scholar 2003
- Emil Tanagho Prize for Best Innovative Research; International Society for Sexual and Impotence Research (ISSIR) 2002
- Sponseller Award for Excellence in Research 2002
- National Kidney Foundation of Maryland Grant; (NKF) 2001-2002

== Clinical trials ==
Current clinical trials include:

- High Intensity Focused Ultrasound (HIFU) Ablation for Treatment of Prostate Tissue in Bladder Outlet Obstruction (HIFU for BOO) ClinicalTrials.gov ID NCT07194187. Sponsor Icahn School of Medicine at Mount Sinai. Information provided by Michael Palese, Icahn School of Medicine at Mount Sinai (Responsible Party). Last Update Posted 2025-09-26.
- GCO#1: 19-0017(0001) ISMMS. A head-to-head comparison of Rezum and UroLift for the treatment of benign prostatic hyperplasia. Dates: 1/11/2019 until 1/10/2023 inclusive.
- GCO#13-0476/BRANY File #12-11-438-05/Argos Therapeutics Protocol AGS-003-007. An International Phase 3 Randomized Trial of Autologous Dendritic Cell Immunotherapy (AGS-003) Plus Standard Treatment of Advanced Renal Cell Carcinoma (ADAPT) Role: Principal Investigator.
- GCO# 11-1290-00001-01-PD. MSSM Project_Focal Cryotherapy for the Treatment of Localized Adenocarcinoma of the Prostate. Role: Principal Investigator.
- GCO 99-415. Tissue Banking of Prostate, Kidney, Bladder Tissue and Blood.
- GCO 03–0962. A Randomized, Double-Blind, Placebo Controlled Phase 3 Trial of Immunotherapy with Autologous Antigen Presenting Cells Loaded with PA2024 (Provenge®, APC8015) in Men with Metastatic, Androgen Independent Prostatic Adenocarcinomas.
- GCO 03-0962(2). An Open Label, Single Arm Trial of Immunotherapy with Autologous Antigen Presenting Cells Loaded with PA2024 (APC8015F) for Subjects With Objective Disease Progression and Disease-Related Pain on Trial D9902 Part B (PB01).
- GCO 08–0813. A Randomized, Multicenter, Single Blind Study in Men with Metastatic Androgen Independent Prostate Cancer to Evaluate Sipuleucel-T Manufactured with Different Concentrations of PA2024 Antigen (P07-2).
- GCO 09–1509. An open label study of sipuleucel-T in men with castrate resistant prostate cancer.
- GCO 10–0751. A Phase I Neoadjuvant Study of In-Situ REIC/Dkk-3 Gene Therapy Followed by Prostatectomy in Patients with High Risk of Localized Prostate Cancer (MTG-REIC-PC001).

== Book chapters ==
- Alexander C. Small and Michael A Palese. Ethanol Injection of Prostate. Treatment of Benign Prostatic Hyperplasia: Modern Alternative to Transurethral Resection of the Prostate. Springer, New York, 2015: 163-172.
- Wedmid A and Palese MA. Complications of Laparoscopic Donor Nephrectomy. Complications of Laparoscopic and Robotic Urologic Surgery. Springer, New York, 2010:127-142.
- Palese MA, Del Pizzo JJ, Munver R and Poppas D. Robotic assisted adult and pediatric pyeloplasty. Textbook of Laparoscopic Urology. Informa Healthcare, New York, 2006:303-311.
- Palese MA, Mulhall JP and Goldstein I. Surgical treatments for vasculogenic erectile dysfunction. Atlas of Male Sexual Dysfunction. Current Medicine LLC, Philadelphia, 2004:115-125.

== Publications ==
- Biasatti, Arianna; Soputro, Nicolas A.; Porpiglia, Francesco; et al. (September 2025). "The current landscape of single-port robotic surgery in urology". Nature Reviews Urology. doi:10.1038/s41585-025-01081-z. PMID 40897917.
- Kim, Esther; Wang, Daniel; Nguyen, Nathan; Levy, Micah; Connors, Christopher; Arroyave Villada, Juan; Awan, Modassar; Zaytoun, Osama; Acosta-Gonzalez, Herik; Palese, Michael A (August 2025). "The Statistical Fragility of Randomized Controlled Trials in Kidney Stone Management: An Analysis of American Urological Association and European Association of Urology Guidelines". Urology. 202: 46–53. doi:10.1016/j.urology.2025.05.039. PMID 40436073.
- Arroyave, Juan Sebastian; Restrepo, Mateo; Cohen, Daniel; Larenas, Francisca; Stern, Brocha Z; Wang, Daniel; Connors, Christopher; Levy, Micah; Fulla, Juan; Palese, Michael A (April 2025). "Appraisal of Spanish-language online patient education resources for kidney stones". World Journal of Urology. 43 (1): 237. doi:10.1007/s00345-025-05588-3. PMID 40259134.
- Connors, Christopher; Omidele, Olamide; Levy, Micah; Wang, Daniel; Arroyave, Juan Sebastian; Kim, Esther; Gonzalez, Herik Acosta; Zaytoun, Osama; Badani, Ketan K; Palese, Michael A (April 2025). "Trends, outcomes, and predictors of open conversion during minimally invasive radical nephroureterectomy for upper tract urothelial carcinoma: a national analysis from 2010 to 2020". Journal of Robotic Surgery. 19 (1): 140. doi:10.1007/s11701-025-02311-7. PMID 40202592.
- Chin, Chih Peng; Levy, Micah; Awan, Modassar; Palese, Michael A (March 2025). "Single-Port and Multi-Port Robotic Donor Nephrectomy". Journal of Endourology. 39 (S1): S66–S71. doi:10.1089/end.2024.0421. PMID 40100837.
- Palese, Michael A (February 2025). "Tribute to Dr. Michael Droller". Urologic Oncology. 43 (2): 123–124. doi:10.1016/j.urolonc.2024.10.033. PMID 39986812.
- Connors, Christopher; Omidele, Olamide; Levy, Micah; Wang, Daniel; Arroyave, Juan Sebastian; Toer, Nir; Jacobi, Sophia; Mayleben, William; Badani, Ketan K; Mehrazin, Reza; Palese, Michael A (April 2025). "Trends and Determinants of Palliative Care Utilization Among Patients With Metastatic Upper Tract Urothelial Carcinoma in the National Cancer Database". Journal of Palliative Care. 40 (2): 137–146. doi:10.1177/08258597241297962. PMID 39552530.
- Arroyave, Juan Sebastián; Larenas, Francisca; Massouh, Ragheb; Gonzalez, Diego; Villafranca Brown, Pablo; Arroyo Concha, Sebastián; Avayú Zaliasnik, Tania; Giménez, Belén; Palese, Michael A (October 2024). "Predictors of symptomatic relief in water vapor thermal therapy for prostatic hyperplasia: 36-month prospective study". World Journal of Urology. 42 (1): 576. doi:10.1007/s00345-024-05295-5. PMID 39412583.
- Sánchez, Catherine; Larenas, Francisca; Arroyave, Juan Sebastián; Connors, Christopher; Giménez, Belén; Palese, Michael A; Fulla, Juan (August 2024). "Artificial Intelligence in Urology: Application of a Machine Learning Model to Predict the Risk of Urolithiasis in a General Population". Journal of Endourology. 38 (8): 712–718. doi:10.1089/end.2023.0702. PMID 38874940.
- Connors, Christopher; Wang, Daniel; Levy, Micah; Ravivarapu, Krishna T; Chin, Chih Peng; Arroyave, Juan Sebastian; Omidele, Olamide; Larenas, Francisca (June 2024). "Transurethral Resection of Bladder Tumor Outcomes Are Predicted by a 5-Item Frailty Index". Urology. 188: 104–110. doi:10.1016/j.urology.2024.03.026. PMID 38522634.
- Connors, Christopher; Levy, Micah; Chin, Chih Peng; Wang, Daniel; Omidele, Olamide; Larenas, Francisca; Palese, Michael A (March 2024). "Differences in cancer presentation, treatment, and mortality between rural and urban patients diagnosed with kidney cancer in the United States". Urologic Oncology. 42 (3): 72.e9–72.e17. doi:10.1016/j.urolonc.2023.12.011. PMID 38195330.
- Palese, Michael A; Chin, Chih Peng; Garden, Evan B; Eilender, Benjamin; Levy, Micah; Ravivarapu, Krishna T; Wang, Daniel; Freid, Hannah; Al-Alao, Osama; Sewell Araya, Joseph; LaPointe-Rudow, Dianne; Herron, Daniel; Chin, Edward; Arvelakis, Antonios; Shapiro, Ron; Larenas, Francisca; Florman, Sander S (February 2024). "Comparison of Single-Port Robotic Donor Nephrectomy and Laparoscopic Donor Nephrectomy". Journal of Endourology. 38 (2): 136–141. doi:10.1089/end.2023.0364. PMID 38185847.
- Arroyave, JS; Wang, D; Connors, C; Larenas, F; Ferrer, F; Palese, Michael A (October 2023). "Open retropubic prostatectomy in a patient with bladder exstrophy for management of hematuria and urethral discharge - A case report". Urology Case Reports. 15 (51) 102590. doi:10.1016/j.eucr.2023.102590. PMC 10622629. PMID 37928513.
- Levy, Micah; Chin, Chih Peng; Ravivarapu, Krishna T; Al-Alao, Osama; Larenas, Francisca; Palese, Michael A (September 2023). "Swiss LithoClast® Trilogy Lithotripter for Use in Robotic Pyelolithotomy". CRSLS. 10 (3): e2023.00027. doi:10.4293/CRSLS.2023.00027. PMC 10476237. PMID 37671366.
- Holzner, Matthew L; Palese, Michael A; Florman, Sander (November 2023). "Living donor kidney transplant from a donor with iatrogenic ureteral avulsion: A case report". Clinical Transplantation. 37 (11) e15095. doi:10.1111/ctr.15095. PMID 37572316.
- Levy, Micah; Chin, Chih Peng; Walt, Aaron; Hess, Skylar M; Butler, Liam R; Moody, Kate A; Qian, Daniel X; Wang, Daniel; Connors, Christopher; Stifelman, Jacob; Omidele, Olamide O; Larenas, Francisca; Atallah, William M; Dinlenc, Caner; Gupta, Mantu; Palese, Michael A (July 2023). "The Role of Experience: How Case Volume and Endourology-Fellowship Training Impact Surgical Outcomes for Ureteroscopy". Journal of Endourology. 37 (7): 843–851. doi:10.1089/end.2023.0142. PMID 37171135.
- Levy, Micah; Connors, Christopher; Ravivarapu, Krishna T; Chin, Chih Peng; Tomer, Nir; Larenas, Francisca; Stock, Jeffrey; Palese, Michael A (August 2023). "Evaluating the safety of same-day discharge following pediatric pyeloplasty and ureteral reimplantation; A NSQIP analysis 2012-2020". Journal of Pediatric Urology. 19 (4): 434.e1–434.e9. doi:10.1016/j.jpurol.2023.04.012. PMID 37147143.
- Chin, Chih Peng; Smith, William H; Cesaretti, Jamie; Terk, Mitchell; Garden, Evan B; Araya, Joseph Sewell; Palese, Michael A; Stock, Richard G; Buckstein, Michael (June 2023). "Clinical and treatment characteristics of secondary bladder malignancies following low dose rate brachytherapy for prostate cancer". Urologic Oncology. 41 (6): 296.e9–296.e16. doi:10.1016/j.urolonc.2022.12.007. PMID 36588020.
- Chin, Chih Peng; Garden, Evan B; Ravivarapu, Krishna T; Shukla, Devki; Omidele, Olamide; Levy, Micah; Qian, Daniel; Sewell Araya, Joseph; Valenzuela, Robert; Reddy, Avinash; Marshall, Susan; Motola, Jay; Nobert, Craig; Gupta, Mantu; Small, Alexander C; Kaplan, Steven A; Palese, Michael A (December 2022). "Medium-Term Real-World Outcomes of Minimally Invasive Surgical Therapies for Benign Prostatic Hyperplasia: Water Vapor Thermal Therapy (Rezum) vs Prostatic Urethral Lift (UroLift) in a High-Volume Urban Academic Center". Journal of Endourology. 36 (12): 1559–1566. doi:10.1089/end.2022.0385. PMID 36039926.
- Ravivarapu, Krishna Teja; Garden, Evan; Chin, Chih Peng; Levy, Micah; Al-Alao, Osama; Sewell-Araya, Joseph; Small, Alexander C; Mehrazin, Reza; Palese, Michael A (October 2022). "Same-day discharge following minimally invasive partial and radical nephrectomy: a National Surgical Quality Improvement Program (NSQIP) analysis". World Journal of Urology. 40 (10): 2473–2479. doi:10.1007/s00345-022-04105-0. PMID 35907008.
- Rosen, Daniel C; Winoker, Jared S; Mullen, Greg; Moshier, Erin; Sim, Alan; Pathak, Prachee; Wagaskar, Vinayak; Sfakianos, John P; Reddy, Avinash; Palese, Michael A; Badani, Ketan K; Wiklund, Peter; Tewari, Ashutosh; Mehrazin, Reza (December 2022). "Robot-assisted vs ultrasonography-guided transversus abdominis plane (TAP) block vs local anaesthesia in urology: results of the UROTAP randomized trial". BJU International. 130 (6): 815–822. doi:10.1111/bju.15833. PMID 35727844.
- Garden, Evan B; Ravivarapu, Krishna T; Levy, Micah; Chin, Chih Peng; Omidele, Olamide; Tomer, Nir; Al-Alao, Osama; Sewell Araya, Joseph; Small, Alexander C; Palese, Michael A (July 2022). "The Utilization and Safety of Same-Day Discharge After Transurethral Benign Prostatic Hyperplasia Surgery: A Case-Control, Matched Analysis of a National Cohort". Urology. 165: 59–66. doi:10.1016/j.urology.2022.01.037. PMID 35139412.
- Garden, Evan B; Al-Alao, Osama; Razdan, Shirin; Mullen, Gregory R; Florman, Sander; Palese, Michael A (October 2021). "Robotic Single-Port Donor Nephrectomy with the da Vinci SP® Surgical System". JSLS. 25 (4): e2021.00062. doi:10.4293/JSLS.2021.00062. PMC 8692076. PMID 34949909.
- Ravivarapu, Krishna T; Garden, Evan B; Al-Alao, Osama; Small, Alexander C; Palese, Michael A (June 2022). "Adrenalectomy outcomes predicted by a 5-item frailty index (5-iFI) in the ACS-NSQIP database". American Journal of Surgery. 223 (6): 1120–1125. doi:10.1016/j.amjsurg.2021.11.020. PMID 34857360.
- Tomer, Nir; Chakravarty, Dimple; Ratnani, Parita; Mohamed, Nihal E; Jambor, Ivan; Dovey, Zachary; Palese, Michael A; Tewari, Ashutosh K (April 2022). "Impact of diverticular disease on prostate cancer risk among hypertensive men". Prostate Cancer and Prostatic Diseases. 25 (4): 700–706. doi:10.1038/s41391-021-00454-w. PMID 34621012.
- Garden, Evan B; Shukla, Devki; Ravivarapu, Krishna T; Kaplan, Steven A; Reddy, Avinash K; Small, Alexander C; Palese, Michael A (August 2021). "Rezum therapy for patients with large prostates (≥ 80 g): initial clinical experience and postoperative outcomes". World Journal of Urology. 39 (8): 3041–3048. doi:10.1007/s00345-020-03548-7. PMC 7779102. PMID 33392646.
- Ravivarapu, Krishna T; Omidele, Olamide; Pfail, John; Tomer, Nir; Small, Alexander C; Palese, Michael A (August 2021). "Robotic-assisted simple prostatectomy versus open simple prostatectomy: a New York statewide analysis of early adoption and outcomes between 2009 and 2017". Journal of Robotic Surgery. 15 (4): 627–633. doi:10.1007/s11701-020-01152-w. PMID 33009988.
- Tomer, Nir; Small, Alexander; Mirza, Omar; Palese, Michael A (April 2021). "Evidence of Resilience in Kidney Donors: A New York Statewide Cohort Analysis". Transplantation Procedures. 53 (3): 803–807. doi:10.1016/j.transproceed.2021.01.021. PMID 33551185.
- Shukla, Devki; Small, Alexander; Mehrazin, Reza; Palese, Michael A (April 2021). "Single-port robotic-assisted partial nephrectomy: initial clinical experience and lessons learned for successful outcomes". Journal of Robotic Surgery. 15 (2): 293–298. doi:10.1007/s11701-020-01106-2. PMID 32564222.
- Garden, Evan B; Shukla, Devki; Ravivarapu, Krishna T; Kaplan, Steven A; Reddy, Avinash K; Small, Alexander C; Palese, Michael A (August 2021). "Rezum therapy for patients with large prostates (≥ 80 g): initial clinical experience and postoperative outcomes". World Journal of Urology. 39 (8): 3041–3048. doi:10.1007/s00345-020-03548-7. PMC 7779102. PMID 33392646.
- Tomer, Nir; Garden, Evan; Small, Alexander; Palese, Michael A (January 2021). "Ureteral Stent Encrustation: Epidemiology, Pathophysiology, Management and Current Technology". The Journal of Urology. 205 (1): 68–77. doi:10.1097/JU.0000000000001343. PMID 32856981.
- Fulla, Juan; Small, Alexander; Kaplan-Marans, Elie; Palese, Michael A (December 2020). "Magnetic-Assisted Robotic and Laparoscopic Renal Surgery: Initial Clinical Experience with the Levita Magnetic Surgical System". Journal of Endourology. 34 (12): 1242–1246. doi:10.1089/end.2020.0043. PMC 7757575. PMID 32237897.
- Schussler, Lilli; Khetan, Prerna; Peacock, Matthew; Dickstein, Elisha; LaPointe-Rudow, Dianne; Palese, Michael A; Arvelakis, Antonios; Herron, Daniel; Shapiro, Ron; Florman, Sander; Chin, Edward H (October 2020). "Is obesity a contraindication for kidney donation?". Surgical Endoscopy. 34 (10): 4632–4637. doi:10.1007/s00464-019-07218-7. PMID 31637602.
- Omidele, Olamide O; Finkelstein, Mark; Omorogbe, Aisosa; Palese, Michael A (October 2019). "Radical Prostatectomy Sociodemographic Disparities Based on Hospital and Physician Volume". Clinical Genitourinary Cancer. 17 (5): e1011–e1019. doi:10.1016/j.clgc.2019.05.027. PMID 31239239.
- Tabrizian, Parissa; Giacca, Massimo; Prigoff, Jake; Tran, Benjamin; Holzner, Matthew L; Chin, Edward; Palese, Michael A; Herron, Daniel; Arvelakis, Antonios; LaPointe Rudow, Dianne; Florman, Sander; Shapiro, Ron (September 2019). "Renal Safety of Intravenous Ketorolac Use After Donor Nephrectomy". Progress in Transplantation. 29 (2): 283–286. doi:10.1177/1526924819855360. PMID 31185805.
- Kaplan-Marans, Elie; Fulla, Juan; Tomer, Nir; Bilal, Khawaja; Palese, Michael A (October 2019). "Indocyanine Green (ICG) in Urologic Surgery". Urology. 132: 10–17. doi:10.1016/j.urology.2019.05.008. PMID 31129192.
- Liaw, Christine W; Palese, Michael A; Fabrizio, Larry Di (September 2019). "A Complex Renal Cyst in a Patient on Crizotinib: Case Report". Urology. 131: 21–23. doi:10.1016/j.urology.2019.04.035. PMID 31078629.
- Omidele, Olamide O; Davoudzadeh, Natan; Palese, Michael A (August 2019). "Fellowship and Subspecialization in Urology: An Analysis of Robotic-assisted Partial Nephrectomy". Urology. 130: 36–42. doi:10.1016/j.urology.2019.03.028. PMID 31034918.
- Gul, Zeynep G; Griffith, John J; Welch, Colton; Fischman, Aaron; Palese, Michael A; Badani, Ketan K; Mehrazin, Reza (March 2019). "Focal Ablative Therapy for Renal Cell Carcinoma in Transplant Allograft Kidneys". Urology. 125: 118–122. doi:10.1016/j.urology.2018.12.003. PMID 30552936.
- Omidele, Olamide O; Davoudzadeh, Natan; Shah, Milan; Tomer, Nir; Palese, Michael A (October 2019). "Trends in utilization and perioperative outcomes in live donor nephrectomies: a multi-surgical discipline analysis". World Journal of Urology. 27 (10): 2225–2230. doi:10.1007/s00345-018-2559-1. PMID 30421073.
- Omidele, Olamide O; Davoudzadeh, Natan; Palese, Michael A (January 2018). "Trifecta Outcomes to Assess Learning Curve of Robotic Partial Nephrectomy". JSLS. 22 (1): e2017.00064. doi:10.4293/JSLS.2017.00064. PMC 5809150. PMID 29472757.
- Feng, Rui; Finkelstein, Mark; Bilal, Khawaja; Oermann, Eric K; Palese, Michael A; Caridi, John (May 2018). "Trends and Disparities in Cervical Spine Fusion Procedures Utilization in the New York State". Spine. 43 (10): E601–E606. doi:10.1097/BRS.0000000000002438. PMID 29016436.
- Yang, Anthony; Barman, Naman; Chin, Edward; Herron, Daniel; Arvelakis, Antonios; Rudow, Dianne LaPointe; Florman, Sander S; Palese, Michael A (June 2018). "Robotic-assisted vs. laparoscopic donor nephrectomy: a retrospective comparison of perioperative course and postoperative outcome after 1 year". Journal of Robotic Surgery. 12 (2): 343–350. doi:10.1007/s11701-017-0741-x. PMID 28861703.
- Griffith, J J; Amin, K A; Waingankar, N; Lerner, S M; Delaney, V; Ames, S A; Badani, K; Palese, Michael A; Mehrazin, R (2017). "Solid Renal Masses in Transplanted Allograft Kidneys: A Closer Look at the Epidemiology and Management". American Journal of Transplantation. 17 (11): 2775–2781. doi:10.1111/ajt.14366. PMID 28544435.
- Levy, Isaiah; Finkelstein, Mark; Bilal, Khawaja Hassan; Palese, Michael A (June 2017). "Modified frailty index associated with Clavien-Dindo IV complications in robot-assisted radical prostatectomies: A retrospective study". Urologic Oncology. 35 (6): 425–431. doi:10.1016/j.urolonc.2017.01.005. PMID 28190748.
- Pak, Jamie S; Lee, Jason J; Bilal, Khawaja; Finkelstein, Mark; Palese, Michael A (May 2017). "Utilization Trends and Short-term Outcomes of Robotic Versus Open Radical Cystectomy for Bladder Cancer". Urology. 103: 117–123. doi:10.1016/j.urology.2016.10.067. PMID 28189553.
- Pak, Jamie S; Lee, Jason J; Bilal, Khawaja; Finkelstein, Mark; Palese, Michael A (November 2016). "Utilization trends and outcomes up to 3 months of open, laparoscopic, and robotic partial nephrectomy". Journal of Robotic Surgery. 11 (2): 223–229. doi:10.1007/s11701-016-0650-4. PMID 27804062.
- Finkelstein, Mark; Bilal, Khawaja; Palese, Michael A (December 2016). "Trends in Subspecialization Within Inpatient Urology From 1982 to 2012". Urology. 98: 64–69. doi:10.1016/j.urology.2016.06.052. PMID 27421782.
- Barman, Naman; Palese, Michael A (April 2018). "Robotic-Assisted Laparoscopic Donor Nephrectomy of Patient With Nutcracker Phenomenon". Experimental and Clinical Transplantation. 16 (2): 212–215. doi:10.6002/ect.2015.0335. PMID 27210521.
- Barman, Naman; Palese, Michael A (March 2016). "Robotic surgery for treatment of chyluria". Journal of Robotic Surgery. 10 (1): 1–4. doi:10.1007/s11701-016-0560-5. PMID 26861449.
- Finkelstein, Mark; Bilal, Khawaja H; Palese, Michael A (2015). "A Medical Application to Bridge the Gap between Clinicians and Clinical Data". Studies in Health Technology and Informatics. 210: 681–683. PMID 25991238.
- Jayadevan, R; Stensland, K; Small, A; Hall; Palese, Michael A (October 2014). "A protocol to recover needles lost during minimally invasive surgery". JSLS. 18 (4): e2014.00165. doi:10.4293/JSLS.2014.00165. PMC 4254476. PMID 25489212.
- Lubezky, Nir; Stern, Eric H.; Nair, Vinay; Herron, Daniel; Chin, Eduard; Palese, Michael A; LaPointe Rudow, Dianne; Delaney, Veronica; Goldstein, Michael; Florman, Sander; Rocca, Juan P (September 2014). "Pulmonary embolus originating from renal vein stump thrombus after laparoscopic living donor nephrectomy: case report". Transplantation Procedures. 46 (7): 2406–2408. doi:10.1016/j.transproceed.2014.01.013. PMID 25242795.
- Harvey, KA; Palese, Michael A (May 2013). "Ablative Therapies for Small Renal Masses". Contemporary Oncology. 5 (1): 10–14.
- Leapman, Michael S; Jibara, Ghalib; Tabrizian, Parissa; Franssen, Bernardo; Yang, Ming-Jim; Romanoff, Anya; Hall, Simon J; Palese, Michael; Sarpel, Umut; Hiotis, Spiros; Labow, Daniel (April 2014). "Genitourinary resection at the time of cytoreductive surgery and heated intraperitoneal chemotherapy for peritoneal carcinomatosis is not associated with increased morbidity or worsened oncologic outcomes: a case-matched study". Annals of Surgical Oncology. 21 (4): 1153–1161. doi:10.1245/s10434-013-3393-8. PMID 24322531.
- Small, Alexander C; Gainsburg, Daniel M; Mercado, Miguel A; Link, Richard E; Hedican, Sean P; Palese, Michael A (September 2013). "Laparoscopic needle-retrieval device for improving quality of care in minimally invasive surgery". Journal of the American College of Surgeons. 217 (3): 400–405. doi:10.1016/j.jamcollsurg.2013.02.035. PMID 23707045.
- Gupta, Mohit; Akhavan, Ardavan; Hall, Matthew; Palese, Michael A (October 2012). "Negative pressure pulmonary edema after laparoscopic donor nephrectomy". JSLS. 16 (4): 647–649. doi:10.4293/108680812X13517013316519. PMC 3558907. PMID 23484579.
- Tsao, Che-Kai; Small, Alexander C; Kates, Max; Moshier, Erin L; Wisnivesky, Juan P; Gartrell, Benjamin A; Sonpavde, Guru; Godbold, James H; Palese, Michael A; Hall, Simon J; Oh, William K; Galsky, Matthew D (December 2012). "Cytoreductive nephrectomy for metastatic renal cell carcinoma in the era of targeted therapy in the United States: a SEER analysis". World Journal of Urology. 31 (6): 1535–1539. doi:10.1007/s00345-012-1001-3. PMC 4744480. PMID 23223962.
- Tsao, Che-Kai; Small, Alexander C; Moshier, Erin L; Gart, Benjamin A; Wisnivesky, Juan P; Sonpavde, Guru; Godbold, James H; Palese, Michael A; Hall, Simon J; Oh, William K; Galsky, Matthew D (September 2012). "Trends in the use of cytoreductive nephrectomy in the United States". Clinical Genitourinary Cancer. 10 (3): 159–163. doi:10.1016/j.clgc.2012.03.008. PMC 4744481. PMID 22651971.
- Small, Alexander C; Tsao, Che-Kai; Moshier, Erin L; Gartrell, Benjamin A; Wisnivesky, Juan P; Godbold, James; Sonpavde, Guru; Palese, Michael A; Hall, Simon J; Oh, William K; Galsky, Matthew D (October 2013). "Trends and variations in utilization of nephron-sparing procedures for stage I kidney cancer in the United States". World Journal of Urology. 31 (5): 1211–1217. doi:10.1007/s00345-012-0873-6. PMC 4744479. PMID 22622394.
- Kates, Max; Lavery, Hugh J; Brajtbord, Jonathan; Samadi, David; Palese, Michael A (August 2012). "Decreasing rates of lymph node dissection during radical nephrectomy for renal cell carcinoma". Annals of Surgical Oncology. 19 (8): 2693–2699. doi:10.1245/s10434-012-2330-6. PMID 22526899.
- Iberti, Colin T; Mohamed, Mohamed; Palese, Michael A (2011). "A review of focal therapy techniques in prostate cancer: clinical results for high-intensity focused ultrasound and focal cryoablation". Reviews in Urology. 13 (4): 196–202. PMC 3253722. PMID 22232569.
- Lavery, Hugh J; Small, Alexander C; Samadi, David B; Palese, Michael A (July 2011). "Transition from laparoscopic to robotic partial nephrectomy: the learning curve for an experienced laparoscopic surgeon". JSLS. 15 (3): 291–297. doi:10.4293/108680811X13071180407357. PMC 3183539. PMID 21985712.
- Lavery, Hugh J; Patel, Shiv; Palese, Michael A; Kasabian, Nabet G; Gainsburg, Daniel M; Samadi, David B (October 2010). "Combined robotic radical prostatectomy and robotic radical nephrectomy". JSLS. 14 (4): 603–607. doi:10.4293/108680810X12924466008763. PMC 3083060. PMID 21605533.
- Palese, MA (Jan 2011). "Opposing views: Laparoscopic cryoablation for a 3 cm nonhilar renal tumor". J Urol. 185 (1): 14–6. doi:10.1016/j.juro.2010.10.005. PMID 21074203.
- Wedmid, A; Palese, MA (February 2010). "Diagnosis and treatment of the adrenal cyst". Curr Urol Rep. 11 (1): 44–50. doi:10.1007/s11934-009-0080-1. PMID 20425637. S2CID 207339958.
- Chin, EH; Hazzan, D; Edye, M; Wisnivesky, JP; Herron, DM; Ames, SA; Palese, MA; Pomp, A; Gagner, M; Bromberg, JS (July 2009). "The first decade of a laparoscopic donor nephrectomy program: effect of surgeon and institution experience with 512 cases from 1996 to 2006". J Am Coll Surg. 209 (1): 106–113. doi:10.1016/j.jamcollsurg.2009.02.060. PMID 19651070.
- Maniar, KP; Kalir, TL; Palese, MA; Unger, PD (2009). "Endosalpingiosis of the Urinary Bladder: A Case of Probable Implantative Origin With Characterization of Benign Fallopian Tube Immunohistochemistry". Int J Surg Pathol. 18 (5): 381–3. doi:10.1177/1066896909332730. PMID 19282293. S2CID 30517521.
- Simon, DR; Palese, MA (Jan 2009). "Clinical update on the management of adrenal hemorrhage". Curr Urol Rep. 10 (1): 78–83. doi:10.1007/s11934-009-0014-y. PMID 19116100. S2CID 19336379.
- Mufarrij, PW; Woods, M; Shah, OD; Palese, MA; Berger, AD; Thomas, R; Stifelman, MD (October 2008). "Robotic dismembered pyleoplasty: A 6-year, multi-institutional experience". J. Urol. 180 (4): 1391–1396. doi:10.1016/j.juro.2008.06.024. PMID 18707739.
- Muller, A; Akin-Olugbade, Y; Deveci, S; Donohue, JF; Tal, R; Kobylarz, KA; Palese, M; Mulhall, JP (2008). "The Impact of Shock Wave Therapy at Varied Energy and Dose Levels on Functional and Structural Changes in Erectile Tissue". Eur Urol. 53 (3): 635–642. doi:10.1016/j.eururo.2007.06.032. PMID 17618733.
- Simon, DR; Palese, MA (Jan 2008). "Noninvasive adrenal imaging in hyperaldosteronism". Curr Urol Rep. 9 (1): 80–87. doi:10.1007/s11934-008-0015-2. PMID 18366979. S2CID 42425768.
- Disick, GI; Palese, MA (Jan 2007). "Extra-adrenal pheochromocytoma: diagnosis and management". Curr Urol Rep. 8 (1): 83–88. doi:10.1007/s11934-007-0025-5. PMID 17239321. S2CID 22383285.
- Raman, JD; Palese, MA; Ng, CK; Boorjian, SA; Scherr, DS; Del Pizzo, JJ; Sosa, RE (December 2006). "Hand-Assisted Laparoscopic Nephroureterectomy for Upper Urinary Tract Transitional Cell Carcinoma". JSLS. 10 (4): 432–438. PMC 3015762. PMID 17575752.
- Deveci, S; Palese, MA; Parker, M; Guhring, P; Mulhall, JP (2006). "Erectile function profiles in men with Peyronie's disease". J Urol. 175 (5): 1807–11. doi:10.1016/S0022-5347(05)01018-9. PMID 16600766.
- Hurt, KJ; Sezen, SF; Champion, HC; Crone, JK; Palese, MA; Huang, PL; Sawa, A; Luo, X; Musicki, B; Snyder, SH; Burnett, AL (Feb 2006). "Alternatively spliced neuronal nitric oxide synthase mediates penile erection". Proc Natl Acad Sci U S A. 103 (9): 3440–3. Bibcode:2006PNAS..103.3440H. doi:10.1073/pnas.0511326103. PMC 1413936. PMID 16488973.
- Schiff, JD; Palese, MA; Vaughan, ED; Sosa, RE; Coll, D; Del Pizzo, JJ (2005). "Laparoscopic vs. open partial nephrectomy in consecutive patients: The Cornell Experience". BJU International. 96 (6): 811–814. doi:10.1111/j.1464-410X.2005.05718.x. PMID 16153207.
- Boorjian, S; Ng, C; Munver, R; Palese, MA; Vaughan, ED Jr.; Sosa, RE; Del Pizzo, JJ; Scherr, D. (August 2005). "Impact of delay to nephroureterectomy for patients undergoing ureteroscopic biopsy and laser tumor ablation of upper tract transitional cell carcinoma". Urology. 66 (2): 283–287. doi:10.1016/j.urology.2005.02.022. PMID 16098357.
- Palese, MA; Munver, R; Phillips, CK; Dinlenc, C; Stifelmann, M; DelPizzo, JJ (2005). "Robot-assisted laparoscopic dismembered pyeloplasty". JSLS. 9 (3): 252–257. PMC 3015619. PMID 16121866.
- Palese, MA; Stifelmann, MD; Munver, R; Sosa, RE; Philipps, CK; Dinlenc, C; Del Pizzo, JJ (April 2005). "Robot-assisted laparoscopic dismembered pyeloplasty: A combined experience". J Endourol. 19 (3): 382–6. doi:10.1089/end.2005.19.382. PMID 15865532.
- Boorjian, S; Ng, C; Munver, R; Palese, MA; Sosa, RE; Vaughan, ED; Del Pizzo, JJ; Scherr, DS (November 2004). "Abnormal selective cytology predicts tumor recurrences in upper tract transitional cell carcinoma treated with endoscopic laser ablation". J Endourol. 18 (9): 912–916. doi:10.1089/end.2004.18.912. PMID 15659932.
- Musicki, B; Palese, MA; Crone, JK; Burnett, AL (February 2004). "Phosphorylated endothelial nitric oxide synthase mediates vascular endothelial growth factor-induced penile erection". Biol Reprod. 70 (2): 282–289. doi:10.1095/biolreprod.103.021113. PMID 14522830.
- Palese, MA; Crone, JK; Burnett, AL (September 2003). "A castrated mouse model of erectile dysfunction". J Androl. 24 (5): 699–703. doi:10.1002/j.1939-4640.2003.tb02729.x. PMID 12954660.
- Palese, MA; Colonna, JO; Chai, TC (March 2003). "Donor to native ureteroureterostomy in a patient with preexisting ileal conduit during renal transplantation". Urology. 61 (3): 643. doi:10.1016/s0090-4295(02)02376-2. PMID 12639666.
- Palese, MA; Su, LM; Kavoussi, L (July 2002). "Laparoscopic retroperitoneal lymph node dissection after chemotherapy". Urology. 60 (1): 130–134. doi:10.1016/s0090-4295(02)01670-9. PMID 12100938.
- Hurt, KJ; Musicki, B; Palese, MA; Crone, JK; Becker, RE; Moriarity, JL; Snyder, SH; Burnett, AL (2002). "Akt-dependent phosphorylation of endothelial nitric-oxide synthase mediates penile erection". Proc Natl Acad Sci USA. 99 (6): 4061–4066. Bibcode:2002PNAS...99.4061H. doi:10.1073/pnas.052712499. PMC 122648. PMID 11904450.
- Palese, MA; Burnett, AL (December 2001). "Corporoplasty using pericardium allograft (tutoplast) with complex penile prosthesis surgery". Urology. 58 (6): 1049–1052. doi:10.1016/s0090-4295(01)01410-8. PMID 11744489.
- Palese, MA; Ferrer, F; Perlman, E; Gearhart, JP (September 2001). "Metanephric stromal tumor: A rare benign pediatric renal mass". Urology. 58 (3): 462. doi:10.1016/s0090-4295(01)01171-2. PMID 11549506.
