= Janice Savin Williams =

Janice Savin Williams (born in Kingston, Jamaica) is the co-founder and senior principal of The Williams Capital Group, L.P.. She has served on the board of Lenox Hill Neighborhood House, North General Hospital, and ISI, Inc., as well as not-for-profit organizations such as The Fresh Air Fund. Currently, Savin Williams serves on the board of directors of Women In Need and the NAACP-ACTSO, among others.

== Early life and career ==
Born Janice Annette Savin, daughter of Patrick and Fay Savin, she is a graduate of Tufts University having earned a Bachelor of Arts in Economics. Savin Williams began her 30-year career on Wall Street with Shearson Lehman Brothers. She then became vice president, taxable fixed income sales at Drexel Burnham Lambert, Inc. before joining The Industrial Bank of Japan Ltd. In her capacity as senior principal at Williams Capital, she is responsible for developing and servicing the firm's institutional fixed income relationships and evaluating strategic new business initiatives.

== The Williams Capital Group, L.P. ==
Established in 1994 by Savin Williams and husband Christopher J. Williams, The Williams Capital Group is an investment banking firm that serves institutional investors and corporations worldwide in the fixed income and equity capital markets.

Over the past eight years, Williams Capital has ranked among the top 20 most active underwriters of U.S. investment grade corporate debt and has served as lead or co-manager on over 600 public debt and equity offerings with a total face amount of over $800 billion.

The Williams Capital Group, L.P. is based in New York City. The company has additional offices in Chicago, Illinois; Shreveport, Louisiana; Dallas, Texas; Westport, Connecticut; and Alford, Massachusetts, as well as San Diego.

== Awards ==
Savin Williams received The African American Heritage Award by The City of New York, the Partnership with Children's 2004 Ann Vanderbilt Award and the 2004 Business Leadership Award of the New York State Supreme Court. Along with her husband she received the 2013 Leadership Award from The Harlem School of the Arts during the School's Fall Benefit at Lincoln Center.

== Memberships and associations ==
Janice Savin Williams has served on the board of directors for both community and professional associations, including Lenox Hill Neighborhood House, North General Hospital, and ISI, Inc., as well as not-for profit organizations such as The Fresh Air Fund. Additionally, Savin Williams was a Corporate Club member of the Roundabout Theatre Company.

Currently, Savin Williams serves on the board of directors of the American Board of Plastic Surgery, is vice-chair and secretary of the newly formed board of The Harlem School of the Arts, and is a Tufts University Trustee. She also sits on the board of directors of several other not-for-profit organizations, including Women In Need and NAACP-ACTSO. Additionally, she is on the Advisory Board of Partnership with Children and The Brooklyn Prospect Charter School.

== Personal life ==
Savin Williams currently resides in New York City with her husband and their children.
