= Henry J. Carter Specialty Hospital and Nursing Facility =

- NYC Health + Hospitals

Geography
- Location: 1752 Park Avenue, East Harlem, New York, United States
- Coordinates: 40.8030121°N 73.9410468°W

Organization
- Type: Teaching

Services
- Emergency department: None
- Beds: 365
- Speciality: Long-term acute care hospital (LTACH)

History
- Constructed: 2013
- Opened: 2013

Links
- Lists: Hospitals in New York State
- Other links: Hospitals in Manhattan

Henry J. Carter Specialty Hospital and Nursing Facility, also known as NYC Health + Hospitals/Carter, is a long-term acute care hospital (LTACH) located in East Harlem, New York City that was opened in 2013 by the New York City Health and Hospitals corporation.

== History ==
The Henry J. Carter Specialty Hospital and Nursing Facility is located at the site of the former North General Hospital, which was closed in July 2010. This facility partially offset the closure of the Goldwater Memorial Hospital of the Coler-Goldwater Specialty Hospital and Nursing Facility located on the south side of Roosevelt Island. Goldwater Memorial Hospital was closed to make room for expansion of the Cornell Tech educational campus. The $285 million facility is named after Henry J. Carter, a philanthropist whose charity, Wheelchair Charities, has donated more than $25 million to the Health and Hospitals Corporation.
