= College Daily =

Media publication

- 留学生日报
- Formation: 2014
- Founder: Guoyu Timothy Lin
- Founded at: Columbus, Ohio
- Type: New media
- Locations: New York City; Beijing
- Staff: 52 (2021)
- Website: www.collegedaily.cn

College Daily
- Simplified Chinese: 留学生日报
- Traditional Chinese: 留學生日報
- Literal meaning: North America Students Studying Abroad Daily Newspaper
Transcriptions
Standard Mandarin
- Hanyu Pinyin: Běiměi Liúxuéshēng Rìbào

College Daily (Chinese: 留学生日报) is a new media publication whose primary audience is Chinese students studying in North America.

== Overview ==
In August 2019, The New Yorker published a story about College Daily, calling it a "post-truth" publication where Chinese students in the U.S. receive their news." The story noted that College Daily had aggregated and reproduced content sourced from Infowars and RT as well as state propaganda outlets such as Sputnik News.

College Daily articles about Yale have been linked to Chinese state propaganda by the Yale Daily News.

== History ==
The College Daily has spread misleading and false information about the 2019 Hong Kong Protests including that protesters would receive a $20 million reward for killing a police officer. The Diplomat described their efforts to spread misleading information as “notorious."

In September 2019 the College Daily published a story calling for Australian journalist and academic Vicky Xiuzhong Xu’s estranged father to be expelled from China due to her outspoken journalism. The article asserted that Xu was an “American mouthpiece” and that she only criticized the Chinese government in order to get political asylum in Australia.

== See also ==
- Chinese Students and Scholars Association
