= Cotton Club Boys (chorus line) =

African American chorus line entertainers (1934–1942)

The Cotton Club Boys were African American chorus line entertainers who, from 1934, performed class act dance routines in musical revues produced by the Cotton Club until 1940, when the club closed, then as part of Cab Calloway's revue on tour through 1942.

They debuted in the 24th edition of the "Cotton Club Parade" in spring 1934, a period at the beginning of the swing era, the post-Harlem Renaissance, a year after Prohibition, and the trough of the Great Depression. The chorus line's name often included a prefix reflecting the number of entertainers, such as "The Six Cotton Club Boys", "The 12 Cotton Club Boys", etc.

== History ==
Some Cotton Club Boys alumni went on to become major influences in American arts and culture. Cholly Atkins, for example, contributed to Motown, musical theatre, and film. While the Cotton Club Boys were African-American, the Cotton Club maintained a whites-only policy for customers.

=== The original Cotton Club, Harlem (1923–1936) ===
The Cotton Club first opened in 1923 in Harlem on the 2nd floor of a building at 142nd Street and Lenox Avenue, close to Sugar Hill. The space had been formerly leased and operated by the boxer Jack Johnson as the Club Delux, an intimate supper club. Owney Madden, a bootlegger and gangster, took over the lease in 1923 after his release from Sing Sing. He was one among the syndicate owners that included beer baron Bill Duffy, boxer Tony Panica (John Francis Panica, known in the boxing world as Tommy Wilson), and Harry Block. Madden redecorated the space and changed the name to the Cotton Club. The Cotton Club sold liquor during Prohibition, which lasted until 1933. When the club opened, George "Big Frenchy" Demange was the manager. Walter Brooks, who brought Shuffle Along to Broadway in 1921, was the front, or nominal owner.

The Savoy Ballroom, which had a no-discrimination policy, was one block south at 596 Lenox Avenue. Smalls Paradise, which also had a no-discrimination policy, was seven blocks south and one avenue west at 2294 Seventh Avenue. The old Harlem Club at 142nd Street and Lenox Avenue reopened in May 1937 as the Plantation Club.

=== The new Cotton Club, Midtown (1936–1940) ===
Following the repeal of Prohibition in 1933 and the Harlem riot of 1935, jazz venues began moving from Harlem to Midtown, around 52nd Street, and downtown. The new Cotton Club opened September 24, 1936, at Broadway and 48th Street, in the Great White Way section of the Theater District near Times Square. The Cotton Club was closed for the 1936 season while the owners planned the move. In the interim, some of the entertainers from the original club performed in productions billed as the "Cotton Club Revue" at the Harlem Alhambra.

=== Closing of the Cotton Club (1940) ===
The last show at the Cotton Club ran Saturday night, May 15, 1940, just before Madden left New York. It was reported in 1940 that the Cotton Club had suffered from competition from the World's Fair. Another likely impetus for the closing were the demands of Local 802, the New York chapter of the American Federation of Musicians, for back pay, especially salaries owed to Andy Kirk's band. The location subsequently opened as a nightclub called the Latin Quarter.

=== Influences on the Cotton Club Boys ===
- John Tiller (1854–1925): pioneer of precision dancing, influenced the Cotton Club Boys and Girls, who performed can-cans

== Selected productions: Cotton Club Boys with the Cotton Club Revue ==
=== Cotton Club Boys with the Cotton Club Revue ===
==== 1934 ====
24th edition of Cotton Club Parade

Opened March 23, 1934; opening night was largest show ever staged there; production ran for nine months, merging into fall edition
Produced by Dan Healy (Daniel E. Healy; 1888–1969)
Harold Arlen's last show with Cotton Club Parade
Jimmie Lunceford and His Orchestra featuring Adelaide Hall
Debut of Cotton Club Boys: Stretch Johnson, Charles "Chink Collins, William Smith, Walter Shepherd, Tommy Porter, Maxie Armstrong, Louis Brown, Jimmy Wright, Thomas "'Chink" Lee, Eddie Morton
Songs introduced: "Ill Wind" and "Primitive Prima Donna", both written by Arlen (music) and Koehler (words) for Hall in this production

25th edition of Cotton Club Parade

Produced by Dan Healy
Ran for 8 months
Featuring: Adelaide Hall, Avon Long, and Lena Horne
Dances by Elida Webb (Elida Webb Dawson; 1893–1975); staging by Dan Healy

==== 1935 ====
26th edition of Cotton Club Parade

Opened Thursday, July 25, 1935
Co-stars included Nina Mae McKinney
Claude Hopkins and His Orchestra with singer Orlando Roberson (vocalist) (Note: Orlando Roberson (1909–1977) was a tenor vocalist with big bands during the swing era, noted for having been a pioneer of crooning during a period of technological advances with audio amplification that allowed for it; Roberson had four siblings – two sisters and a brother; one of his sisters, Ida Mae (1903–1986), was married (her 2nd of 4 marriages) to Countee Cullen – American poet of the Harlem Renaissance; Ida Mae, when she became his widow, devoted much of her remaining life as a public exponent of Cullen's works; biographer/author Keven A. Brown is the Orlando Roberson's 2nd great nephew; that is, Ida Mae was Keven Brown's maternal great grandmother)
Producers: Ted Koehler, Leonard Harper, Elida Webb
Music scoring and arranging: Will Vodery, Claude Hopkins, Alex Hill, Ted Koehler
Cotton Club Girls: Dolly McCormack, Lucille Wilson (married Louis Armstong in 1942), Anna Jones, Joyce Beasley, Mae Williamson, Hy Curtiss, Tony Ellis, Ione Sneed, Anna Bell Wilson, Nan Joyce, Marie Robinson, Myrtle Quinland, Arlene Payas
Cotton Club Boys: Chink Lee, Freddie Heron, Ernest Frazier, Eddie Morton, Al Alstock, Louis Brown, Jules Adger

At the Apollo

November 29, 1935 – December 6, 1935
Featuring: Claude Hopkins and His Band with Orlando Roberson (vocalist) and the New Fall Edition of the Cotton Club Revue:
Butterbeans and Susie, Babe Matthews, Cook and Brown – tap dance duo of Charles Cook and Ernest Brown – Miller and Mantan, Jesse Cryor (de) (1906–2006), Cora LaRedd (died 1968), Bob Wallace, Lena Horne, Dolly McCormack, the Cotton Club Boys, the Cotton Club Girls

==== 1936 ====
At the Apollo

Opened June 26, 1936 (for 1 week)
Chick Webb and His Band with Bardu Ali (vocalist and MC)

Taft Jordan, trumpeter, was in the band

Staging by Addison Carey (likely a pseudonym; 1899–1952)
Cotton Club Boys
Stars included Charles Linton, Teddy McRae, Charlie Ray, Kitty Aublanche;
Pete, Peaches and Duke – precision dancers

Gary Lambert "Pete" Nugent (1909–1973)
Irving "Peaches" Beamon (born 1911)
Duke Miller (1910–1937)

Pigmeat-Mason-Baskette

Dewey "Pigmeat" Markham
John Mason
Jimmy Baskette

Vivian Harris (1902–2000)

1st edition (aka 27th edition) of Cotton Club Parade

Opened mid-September 1936
At the new Cotton Club at Broadway and 48th Street
Produced by Dan Healy
Book, lyrics, and music by Benny Davis and J. Fred Coots
Directed by Clarence Robinson
Featuring Cab Calloway and His Orchestra
Production and dances by Clarence Robinson

At the Comedy Theater, 110 West 41st Street, Manhattan

Black Rhythm, a "sepia swing musical comedy" in two acts
Book, music, and lyrics by Donald Heywood (Donald Gerard Heywood; 1896–1967)
Directed by Earl Dancer (Note: Earl Dancer (né Earl Harold Dancer; 1894–1963) was once thought to be married to Ethel Waters; in 1943 he married a pianist Viola Nicholas (née Harden; 1893–1971), widow of the late drummer Ulysses D. Nicholas (1892–1935); through her, Dancer had two stepsons: Fayard Nicholas and Harold Nicholas, who were the dancing duo known as Nicholas Brothers) and Lionel Heywood
Produced by Earl Dancer and J.H. Levy
December 19, 1936 – December 24, 1936
Principal stars included Jeni Le Gon and dancer Avon Long
Opening performance was panned by The New York Times theater critic, Bosley Crowther
Production included the Cotton Club Boys

==== 1937 ====
2nd edition of Cotton Club Parade

Duke Ellington and His Orchestra featuring Ethel Waters and the Nicholas Brothers

At the Nixon Grand Theatre, Philadelphia

April 1937
Jimmy Lunceford and His Orchestra, Phantom Steppers, Sandy Burns, Dusty Fletcher, George Wiltshire, the Six Cotton Club Boys

3rd edition of Cotton Club Parade (at midtown Cotton Club)

Staged by Leonard Reed
Duke Ellington (house band), Ethel Waters, Nicholas Brothers, George Dewey Washington (1898–1954), Bill Bailey, Renee and Estelle, Kaloah, Tip, Tap, and Toe (Samuel Green, Ted Frazier, Ray Winfield), Dynamite Hooker
The Chocolateers (acrobatic dance team); possibly the original members: Al Bert "Gip" Gipson, Paul Black, known for his Chinese splits (straddling the floor as he walked), and Eddie West (with James Buster Brown replacing West for a short period of time)

==== 1938 ====
4th edition of Cotton Club Parade

5th edition of Cotton Club Parade

At the Apollo

August 26–31, 1938
WMCA broadcast
Luis Russell Orchestra featuring Red Allen (without Louis) and Sonny Woods, Hazel Diaz (1908–1997), the Cotton Club Boys

==== 1939 ====
At the Apollo

January 7–8 (at midnight)
Featured Jimmy Lunceford and His Band
Stars included Lora Pierre (tap dancer), Flash and Dash, The Three Chocolateers, Jackie Mabley, Dusty Fletcher, The Cotton Club Boys and the Harperettes

At the Broadhurst Theatre

The Hot Mikado (non-WPA version)
March 23, 1939, to June 3, 1939 (85 performances)
Directed by Bill Robinson and Cab Calloway
Score by Ted Koehler and Rube Bloom
Koehler supervised the production
Featured Cab Calloway and His Orchestra, alternating with Socarres's Band
Included Sister Tharpe, Tanya, Katherine Perry, the Beachcombers, Glenn and Jenkins – comedy team of William "Willie" Henry Glenn and Walter Jenkins (Walter Jenkins Manigault; 1884–1953) – Ruby Hill, Myra Johnson, Son and Sonny – tap dancers Roland James and Sonny Montgomery – Will Vodery's choir, the Six Cotton Club Boys, and a full complement of fifty Harlem dancing girls

At the World's Fair, Hall of Music

Located at Flushing Meadows–Corona Park
The Hot Mikado
(video clip via YouTube)
Opened June 20, 1939 (ran 14 months)
Included the Cotton Club Boys

6th edition of Cotton Club Parade

Opened November 1, 1939

==== 1940 ====
1940: The Hot Mikado

The Six Cotton Club Boys, 14-month run with Bill Robinson, traveling with Cab Calloway and His Band

At the Apollo

May 23–30, 1940

On tour

At the State Theater, Main Street and Morgan Street, Hartford

May 25 and 26, 1940
Included The Six Cotton Club Boys

At the Apollo

Opened June 21, 1940
Anise and Aland and Pete Nugent along with Cotton Club Boys and Apollo Dancing Girls
Show included The Six Cotton Club Boys: Jules Adger, Louis Brown, Freddie Heron, Chink Lee (manager), Charles Atkinson, Eddie Morton

In Montreal
In Wrentham
In Norfolk
In Raleigh
In Knoxville

At the Paramount Theatre

On tour, Brendt circuit

At the Strand Theatre, 501 South Salina Street, Syracuse, New York

September 13, 1940

In Flatbush, Brooklyn

Opened around September 30, 1940 (for a week engagement)

At the Apollo

Cab Calloway's New Revue
Opened Friday, November 22, 1940
Stars included Avis Andrews, Anice and Aland, Cook and Brown, Sixteen Apollo Rockettes, and
The Six Cotton Club Boys

==== 1941 ====
At the State-Lake Theater, Chicago

January 1941

At the Paramount Theater, 509 Grand Avenue, Des Moines

January 1941

At Shea's in Buffalo

February 1941
Featuring Cab Calloway and His Orchestra
Included The Six Cotton Club Boys

At the RKO Temple Theatre, 35 Clinton Avenue S., Rochester, New York

From February 7–13, 1941

At the Stanley Theatre, Pittsburgh

February 19, 1941

At the State Theater, Main Street and Morgan Street, Hartford, Connecticut

March 14, 15, 16, 1941

At the State Theater, 212 Locust Street, Harrisburg, Pennsylvania

March 18, 1941

At the Earle Theatre, 11th and Market, Philadelphia

Cab Calloway's Quizzicale

National broadcasts of live performances
July 6 – October 5, 1941
Mutual Broadcasting System

At Camp Wheeler, Macon, Georgia
At Fort Dix, near Trenton, New Jersey

At the State-Lake Theater, Chicago

4th appearance in 24 months

At the Rialto, Louisville, Kentucky

Opened October 25, 1941

At the Palace Theatre, Canton, Ohio

At the State Theatre, Uniontown, Pennsylvania

At the State Theater, Hartford

At the Adams Theatre, 28 Branford Place, Newark

At the Strand Theatre, Brooklyn

==== 1942 ====
Cab Calloway's Quizzicale

National broadcasts of live performances
Blue Network ran weekly on Tuesday evenings for 6 months

February 25, 1942; OCLC 18067521
From Detroit, March 4, 1942 OCLC 18067504
From The Panther Room, Hotel Sherman, Chicago, April 21, 1942

At the Casa Mañana nightclub, 8781 Washington Boulevard in Culver City

Opened July 23, 1942
Largest 4-day opening in the club's history; opening night drew 9,084 patrons

==== 1942–44 musicians' strike ====
Commenced August 1, 1942: no musician could perform on a radio broadcast or make a recording

At the Orpheum Theatre, Minneapolis

November 1942

At the Paradise Theatre, Detroit

December 4–10, 1942
Stars included Cholly and Dotty (Dotty Saulters; 1922–1962) (dancers), Benny Payne (de) (1907–1986) (vocalist), Cotton Club Boys

== Selected members ==
Ten original members

1. Howard Johnson (aka "Stretch Johnson", Howard Eugene Johnson; 1915–2000); his sister Winnie Johnson (1918–1980) was a member of the Cotton Club Girls, from 1937–1938 was married to Hollywood actor Stepin Fetchit
2. Charles "Chink" Collins
3. Billy Smith (William Smith) went into the restaurant business; during World War II, served in the first fully integrated outfit in the U.S. Army as an entertainer in Irving Berlin's production This Is The Army
4. Walter Shepherd
5. Tommy Porter (Thomas Porter)
6. Maxie Armstrong (Maxwell Armstrong, Jr.; 1914–2001) sang with the 366th Infantry Band during World War II
7. Louis Brown went on to become a liquor salesman
8. Jimmy Wright
9. Thomas "Chink" Lee (manager) went on to become a tavern manager
10. Eddie Morton (Edward James Morton, Jr.; 1910–1998) in 1951 married singer Ida Mae James, then in 1960 married Nan Steinburg

Subsequent members

11. Cholly Atkins (Charles Sylvan Atkinson; 1913–2003) began dancing with the Cotton Club Boys as a substitute from someone who was ill; Honi Coles, who lived in the same building as Atkins, made the recommendation; production was Bill Robinson's The Hot Mikado, the biggest hit of Cotton Club Revue; Atkins soon became a choreographer with Cotton Club Boys
12. Jules Adjer (Julian Francis Adger, Jr.; 1913–1991) among other things, was a dancer in the 1943 film, Cabin in the Sky
13. Freddie Heron (Frederick Clinton Heron; 1910–1977) born in the Panama Canal Zone; went on to become chief bartender at Shalimar by Randolph at 3638 Broadway (at 150th Street) and 2065 7th Avenue (at 123rd Street), owned by Luther "Red" Randolph (Luther Jerry Randolph; 1912–2005), club flourished from 1939 to 1966; in 1954 went out on his own, taking on food concession at the Silver Rail in Harlem (current location of Magic Johnson Theatres)
14. Warren Coleman (1900–1968) brother of Ralph Coleman
15. Roy Chink Baker went on to own the Mona Lisa Tavern on Lexington Avenue
16. Al Martin
17. Ernest Frazier
18. Al Alstock (Paxton Alfonson Allstock; 1914–1937) died on October 18, 1937; had married Mary Leah Harris on February 12, 1937
19. Roy Carter
20. Sherman Coates (Note: Sherman Coates, who is identified as a "subsequent dancer" with the Cotton Club Boys by James Haskins (1941–2005) (The Cotton Club, 1997; Tap Dancing America Database, Library of Congress; retrieved February 27, 2017) is not the same person as Sherman Coates (1872–1912), pioneer of acro dancing of an earlier generation. The earlier Sherman Coates was part of a vaudevillian burlesque comedy duo with James Grundy (1876–1911); Coates was the straight man; those two, with their wives, Lulu Coates and Sue Grundy (1887–1934), and Tennie Russell (who replaced Gertine Miller) as Sam Patterson's (1881–1955) "Watermelon Trust" on tours, coast-to-coast; as part of the Harry Bryant Extravaganza Burlesque Company. Harry C. Bryant was formerly with Sefton & Watson, composed of Harry Sefton and Billy "Beef Trust" Watson, né Isaac Levy; 1852–1945, owned by Mr. Hill In 1914, Lulu Coates and Archie Leon Ware (1892–1974), Wilfred Blanks (born 1900), Harry Irons (1898–1943), Clifford James Carter (1893–1942) formed a singing-dance troupe, the "Crackerjacks;" Lulu Coates was director until her retirement in 1922, but the Crackerjacks flourished until about 1952; this act pioneered a type of dance known as Acro dance)
