= Stephanie Strom =

American journalist (born 1963)

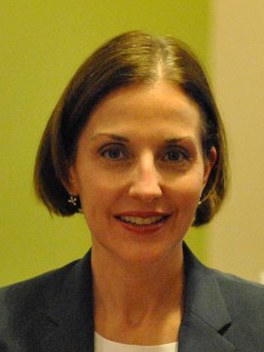
- Born: 1963 (age 62–63); Dickinson, Texas
- Occupation: journalist
- Notable credit: The New York Times

Stephanie Strom (born in Dickinson, Texas) is an American journalist who worked for The New York Times from 1988 to October 2017.

== Biography ==
Strom received her B.A. from Northwestern University in 1985 and an M.S. from Columbia University Graduate School of Journalism in 1986. She began her career at the Times as a clerk in the Washington bureau in 1988.

Strom's previous posts at the Times include: research assistant to A.M. Rosenthal; metropolitan reporter; business/financial reporter focusing on retail and toy industries and Seventh Avenue; business/financial reporter covering Wall Street and the financial industry; business correspondent in the Tokyo bureau; correspondent focusing on executive compensation; and correspondent focusing on philanthropy and nonprofits.
