= Stretch Johnson =

American tap dancer and activist (1915–2000)

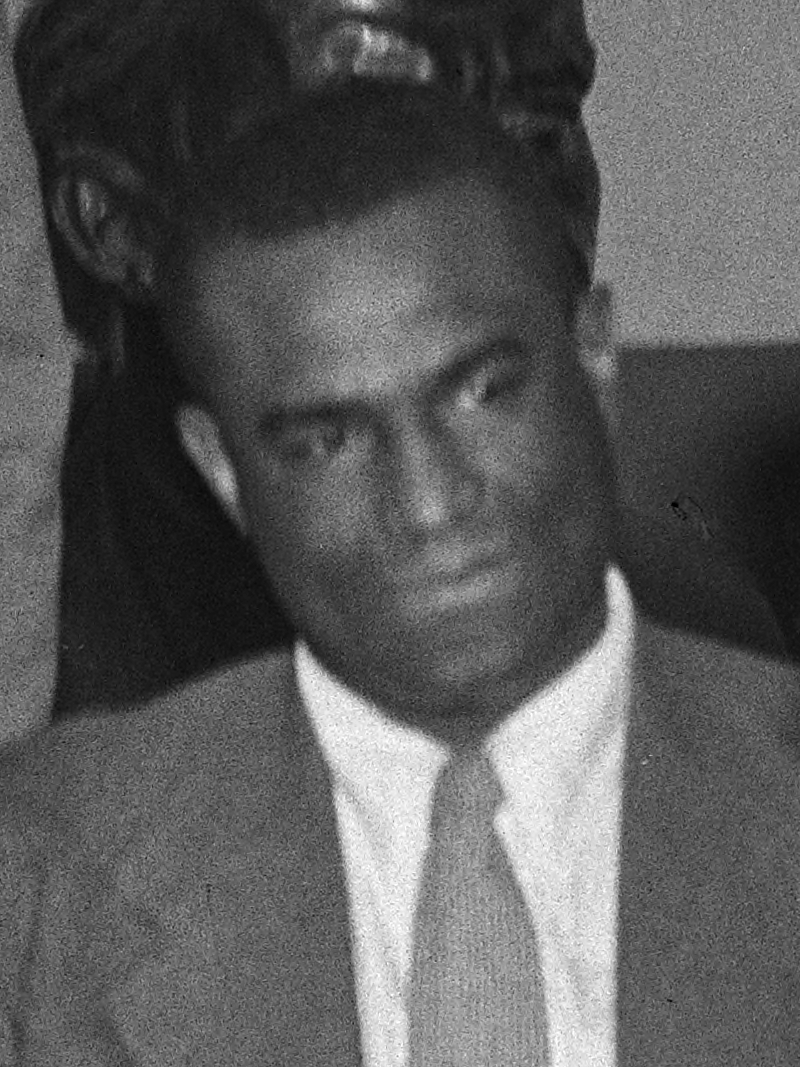
- Johnson in 1950
- Born: Howard Eugene Johnson; January 30, 1915
- Died: May 20, 2000 (aged 85)
- Education: Columbia University
- Occupations: Tap dancer and social activist

Howard Eugene "Stretch" Johnson (January 30, 1915 – May 28, 2000) was an American tap dancer and social activist.

In 1936, he joined his brother Bobby and his sister, Winnie, one of the featured dancers at the Cotton Club, to form an act called the Three Johnsons, which was featured in New Faces of 1936 and the Duke Ellington Revue of 1937 at the Apollo Theater. He later acted in a Harlem production of Clifford Odets play Waiting for Lefty.

A member of the N.A.A.C.P. since he was 15, Johnson served in the 92nd "Buffalo" Division in World War II, winning two Purple Hearts.

He joined the Young Communist League of Harlem in 1940, prompted in part by lynchings in the American South, and he remained in the Communist Party USA until the late 1950s, when he and many other members left over Khrushchev's revelations about Stalin revealed in the Secret Speech.

Johnson became a printer, and worked at The New York Times. He earned a high school equivalency diploma and then a degree from Columbia University. He subsequently taught black studies at the Fieldston School and later taught sociology at the State University of New York at New Paltz.

In Hawaii, in the 1980s, Johnson served as the first editor of the Afro-Hawaiian News, the state's only African-American newspaper at the time. Under his leadership, the newspaper successfully advocated for making Martin Luther King Jr. Day a state holiday in Hawaii.

== Works cited ==
- Johnson, Howard Eugene; Johnson, Wendy (2014). A Dancer in the Revolution: Stretch Johnson, Harlem Communist at the Cotton Club. Fordham University Press. ISBN 9780823256556.
