= Capital Health Regional Medical Center =

- Capital Health System

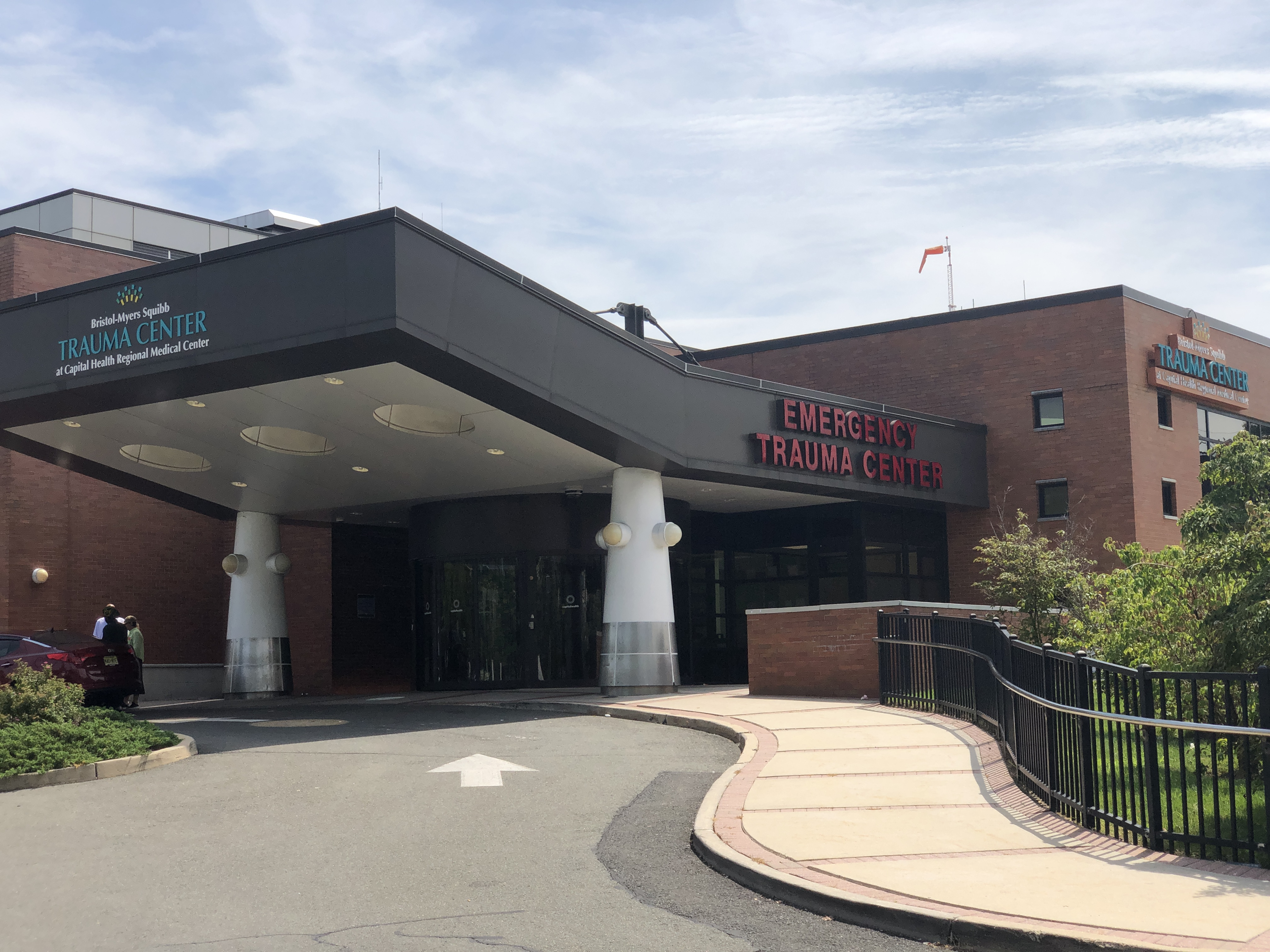
- Trauma center entrance of the Capital Health Regional Medical Center

Geography
- Location: 750 Brunswick Ave; Trenton, New Jersey, United States

Organization
- Care system: Private
- Type: General regional
- Affiliated university: New York Institute of Technology College of Osteopathic Medicine

Services
- Emergency department: Level II trauma center
- Beds: 265

History
- Founded: 1889

Links
- Website: https://www.capitalhealth.org
- Lists: Hospitals in New Jersey

Capital Health Regional Medical Center is a member of Capital Health System. Located in Trenton, New Jersey, Capital Health Regional Medical Center, is a regional academic medical center and state designated trauma center that cares for both complex and routine cases.

Capital Health operates two hospitals, Capital Health Regional Medical Center in Trenton and Capital Health Medical Center in Hopewell, an outpatient facility in Hamilton, and various primary and specialty care practices across the region. Capital Health is accredited by The Joint Commission.

Capital Health serves as a Level II regional trauma center, regional perinatal center (including a Level III NICU), and emergency mental health screening center. It is also a clinical affiliate of the New York Institute of Technology College of Osteopathic Medicine.

== See also ==
- St. Francis Medical Center (Trenton, New Jersey)
