= West Virginia =

U.S. state

- State
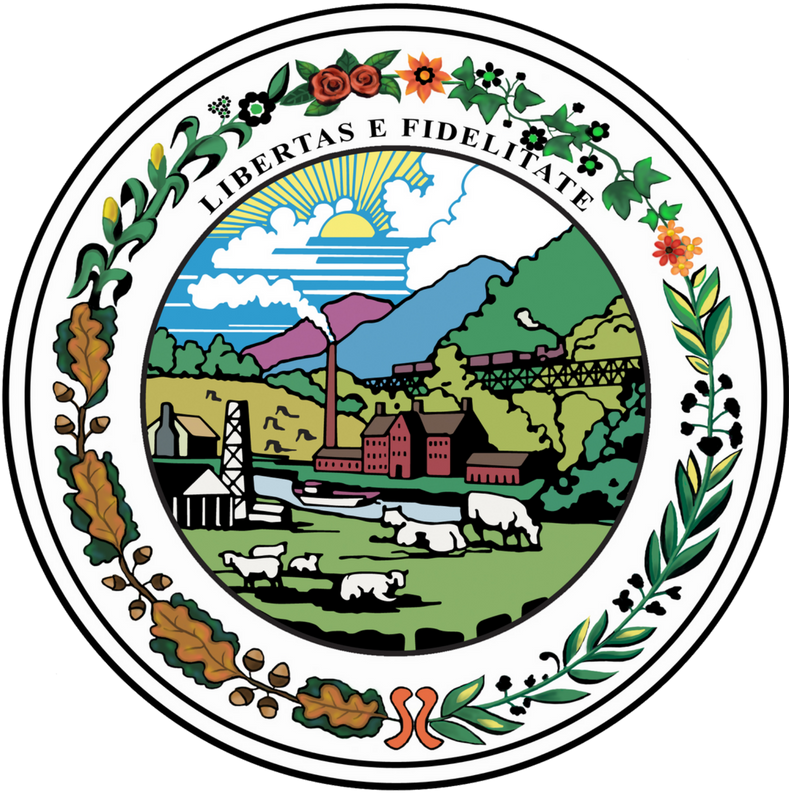
- Flag Seal
- Nickname: Mountain State
- Motto: Montani semper liberi (English: Mountaineers Are Always Free)
- Anthem: Four songs
- Location of West Virginia within the United States
- Country: United States
- Before statehood: Part of Virginia
- Admitted to the Union: June 20, 1863; 163 years ago (35th)
- Capital (and largest city): Charleston
- Largest county or equivalent: Kanawha
- Largest metro and urban areas: Charleston–Huntington (combined); Huntington (metro and urban)

Government
  - Governor: Patrick Morrisey (R)
  - Lieutenant Governor: Randy Smith (R)
- Legislature: West Virginia Legislature
  - Upper house: Senate
  - Lower house: House of Delegates
- Judiciary: Supreme Court of Appeals of West Virginia
- U.S. senators: Shelley Moore Capito (R); Jim Justice (R)
- U.S. House delegation: 1: Carol Miller (R); 2: Riley Moore (R) (list)

Area
  - Total: 24,230 sq mi (62,756 km^{2})
  - Land: 24,078 sq mi (62,361 km^{2})
  - Water: 152 sq mi (394 km^{2}) 0.6%
  - Rank: 41st

Dimensions
  - Length: 239 mi (385 km)
  - Width: 130 mi (210 km)
- Elevation: 1,512 ft (461 m)
- Highest elevation (Spruce Knob (Note: Elevation adjusted to North American Vertical Datum of 1988)): 4,862 ft (1,482 m)
- Lowest elevation (Potomac River at Virginia border): 240 ft (73 m)

Population (2025)
  - Total: ▼1,766,147
  - Rank: 39th
  - Density: 77/sq mi (29.8/km^{2})
  - Rank: 29th
  - Median household income: ▼$55,900 (2023)
  - Income rank: 49th
- Demonyms: West Virginian, Mountaineer

Language
  - Official language: De jure: English
- Time zone: UTC−05:00 (Eastern)
  - Summer (DST): UTC−04:00 (EDT)
- USPS abbreviation: WV
- ISO 3166 code: US-WV
- Traditional abbreviation: W.Va. and W.V.
- Latitude: 37°12′ N to 40°39′ N
- Longitude: 77°43′ W to 82°39′ W
- Website: wv.gov

West Virginia is a mountainous, landlocked state in the Southern and Mid-Atlantic regions of the United States. (Note: The Census Bureau and the Association of American Geographers classify West Virginia as part of the Southern United States while the Bureau of Labor Statistics classifies the state as a part of the Mid-Atlantic region. (Mid-Atlantic Home : Mid-Atlantic Information Office: U.S. Bureau of Labor Statistics". www.bls.gov. Archived.)) It is bordered by Pennsylvania and Maryland to the northeast, Virginia to the southeast, Kentucky to the southwest, and Ohio to the northwest. West Virginia is the 10th-smallest state by area and ranks as the 12th-least populous state, with 1,778,373 residents. The capital and most populous city is Charleston, with 49,055 residents.

West Virginia is dominated by mountainous terrain, shaped by the Allegheny and Cumberland ranges and cut by the Ohio, Kanawha, and Potomac river valleys. This geography isolated the region from the rest of Virginia. When Virginia seceded from the Union in 1861, some of its western counties refused to follow while others supported it; the resulting split led to West Virginia's admission into the Union on June 20, 1863, as a slave state and a key border state during the American Civil War. It was one of two states admitted during the war, along with Nevada, and the only state formed by separating from a Confederate state. Railroad expansion later opened the state's southern and northern coalfields to large-scale development, and by the early 20th century, West Virginia had become one of the nation's leading coal producers.

West Virginia's northern panhandle sits between Pennsylvania and Ohio, forming a tristate area; Wheeling, Weirton, and Morgantown lie just across the border from the Pittsburgh metropolitan area. Huntington, in the southwest, is close to Ohio and Kentucky, while Martinsburg and Harpers Ferry, in the eastern panhandle between Maryland and Virginia, are considered part of the Washington metropolitan area. West Virginia is often included in several U.S. geographical regions, including the Mid-Atlantic, the Upland South, and the Southeastern United States. It is the only state entirely within the area served by the Appalachian Regional Commission, an area commonly defined as "Appalachia".

The state is noted for its mountains and rolling hills, its historically significant coal mining and logging industries, and its political and labor history. It is also known for its tourism and a wide range of outdoor recreational opportunities, including skiing, whitewater rafting, fishing, hiking, backpacking, mountain biking, rock climbing, and hunting. From the Great Depression to the 1990s, the state voted heavily for the Democratic Party due to its tradition of union-based politics. Since then, the state has become heavily Republican, and is considered a "deep red" state at the federal level. West Virginia consistently ranks among the lowest U.S. states in terms of health outcomes, life expectancy, education, and certain other economic factors. West Virginia ranks first in the nation in homeownership, and is ranked third in both affordability and equality by U.S. News & World Report.

== History ==
Many ancient manmade earthen mounds from various prehistoric mound builder cultures survive in West Virginia, especially in the areas of present-day Moundsville, South Charleston, and Romney. Artifacts uncovered in these give evidence of village societies with a tribal trade system culture that crafted cold-worked copper pieces.

In the 1670s, during the Beaver Wars, the powerful Haudenosaunee, five allied nations based in present-day New York and Pennsylvania, drove out other Native American tribes from the region to reserve the upper Ohio Valley as a hunting ground. Siouan language tribes like the Moneton had previously been among the earliest recorded in the area. Conflicts with European settlers resulted in various displaced Native tribes settling in West Virginia, where they were known as Mingo, meaning "remote affiliates of the Iroquois Confederacy".

The area now identified as West Virginia was contested territory among Anglo-Americans as well, with the colonies of Pennsylvania and Virginia claiming territorial rights under their colonial charters to this area before the American Revolutionary War. Some speculative land companies, such as the Vandalia Company, the Ohio Company and the Indiana Company, tried but failed to legitimize their claims to land in parts of West Virginia and present-day Kentucky. This rivalry resulted in some settlers petitioning the Continental Congress to create a new territory called Westsylvania. With the federal settlement of the Pennsylvania and Virginia border dispute, creating Kentucky County, Virginia, Kentuckians "were satisfied [...] and the inhabitants of a large part of West Virginia were grateful."

The British Crown considered the area of West Virginia part of its Virginia Colony from 1607 to 1776. The United States considered this area the western part of the state of Virginia (commonly called Trans-Allegheny Virginia) from 1776 to 1863, before West Virginia's formation. Its residents were discontented for years with their position in Virginia, as the government was dominated by the planter elite of the Tidewater and Piedmont areas. The legislature had electoral malapportionment, based on the counting of slaves toward regional populations, and western white residents were underrepresented in the state legislature. More subsistence and established farmers lived in the west, and they were generally less supportive of slavery, although many counties were divided on their support. Residents of that area became more sharply divided after the planter elite of eastern Virginia voted to secede from the Union during the Civil War.

Residents of the western and northern counties set up a separate government under Francis Pierpont in 1861, which they called the Restored Government. The majority voted to separate from Virginia, and the new state was admitted to the Union in 1863. In 1864 a state constitutional convention drafted a constitution, which was ratified by the legislature without putting it to popular vote. West Virginia abolished slavery by a gradual process and temporarily disenfranchised those who had fought for the Confederacy or held Confederate office.

=== Prehistory ===
A 2010 analysis of a local stalagmite revealed that Native Americans were burning forests to clear land as early as 100 BCE. Some regional late-prehistoric Eastern Woodland tribes were more involved in hunting and fishing, practicing the Eastern Agricultural Complex gardening method which used fire to clear out underbrush from certain wooded areas. Another group progressed to the more time-consuming, advanced companion crop fields method of gardening. Also continuing from the ancient Indigenous people of the state, they cultivated tobacco through to early historic times. It was used in numerous social and religious rituals.

"Maize (corn) did not make a substantial contribution to the diet until after 1150 BP", to quote Mills (OSU 2003). Eventually, tribal villages began depending on corn to feed their turkey flocks, as Kanawha Fort Ancients practiced bird husbandry. The local Natives made cornbread and a flat rye bread called "bannock" as they emerged from the protohistoric era. A horizon extending from a little before the early 18th century is sometimes called the acculturating Fireside Cabin culture. Trading posts were established by European traders along the Potomac and James rivers.

Tribes that inhabited West Virginia as of 1600 were the Siouan Monongahela Culture to the north, the Fort Ancient culture along the Ohio River from the Monongahela to Kentucky and extending an unknown distance inland, and the Eastern Siouan Tutelo and Moneton tribes in the southeast. There was also the Iroquoian Susquehannock in the region approximately east of the Monongahela River and north of the Monongahela National Forest, a possible tribe called the Senandoa, or Shenandoah, in the Shenandoah Valley, and the easternmost tip of the state may have been home to the Manahoac people. The Monongahela may have been the same as a people known as the Calicua, or Cali. The following may have also all been the same tribe—Moneton, Moheton, Senandoa, Tomahitan.

During the Beaver Wars, other tribes moved into the region. The Iroquoian Tiontatecaga (also Little Mingo, Guyandotte) seem to have split off from the Petun after they were defeated by the Haudenosaunee. They eventually settled somewhere between the Kanawha and Little Kanawha Rivers. During the 1750s, when the Mingo Seneca separated from the Haudenosaunee and returned to the Ohio River Valley, they contend that this tribe merged with them. The Shawnee arrived as well; though primarily stationed within former Monongahela territory approximately until 1750, they extended their influence throughout the Ohio River region. They were West Virginia's last Native tribe and were driven out by the United States during the Shawnee Wars (1811–1813). The Erie, who were chased out of Ohio around 1655, are now believed to be the same as the Westo, who invaded as far as South Carolina before being destroyed in the 1680s. If so, their path would have brought them through West Virginia. The historical movement of the Tutelo and carbon dating of the Fort Ancients seem to correspond with the given period of 1655–1670 as the time of their removal. The Susquehannocks were original participants in the Beaver Wars but were cut off from the Ohio River by the Haudenosaunee around 1630 and found themselves in dire straits. Suffering from disease and constant warfare and unable to provide for themselves financially, they began to collapse and moved farther and farther east, to the Susquehanna River of Eastern Pennsylvania. The Manahoac were probably forced out in the 1680s when the Haudenosaunee began to invade Virginia. The Siouan tribes there moved into North Carolina and later returned as one tribe, known as the Eastern Blackfoot, or Christannas.

The Westo did not secure the territory they conquered. Even before they were gone, displaced natives from the south flooded into freshly conquered regions and took them over. These became known as the Shattaras, or West Virginia Cherokees. They took in and merged with the Monetons, who began to call themselves the Mohetons. The Calicua also began to call themselves Cherokees soon after, showing an apparent further merger. These Shattaras were closely related to the tribes that formed to the south in the aftermath of the Westo—the Yuchi and Cherokee. From 1715 to 1717, the Yamasee War sprang up. The Senandoa allegedly sided with the Yuchi and were destroyed by Yamasee allies. Therefore, if the Senandoa were the same tribe as the Moneton, this would mean the collapse of Shattara-Moneton culture. Another tribe that appeared in the region was the Canaragay, or Kanawha. It later migrated to Maryland and merged into colonial culture.

=== European exploration and settlement ===
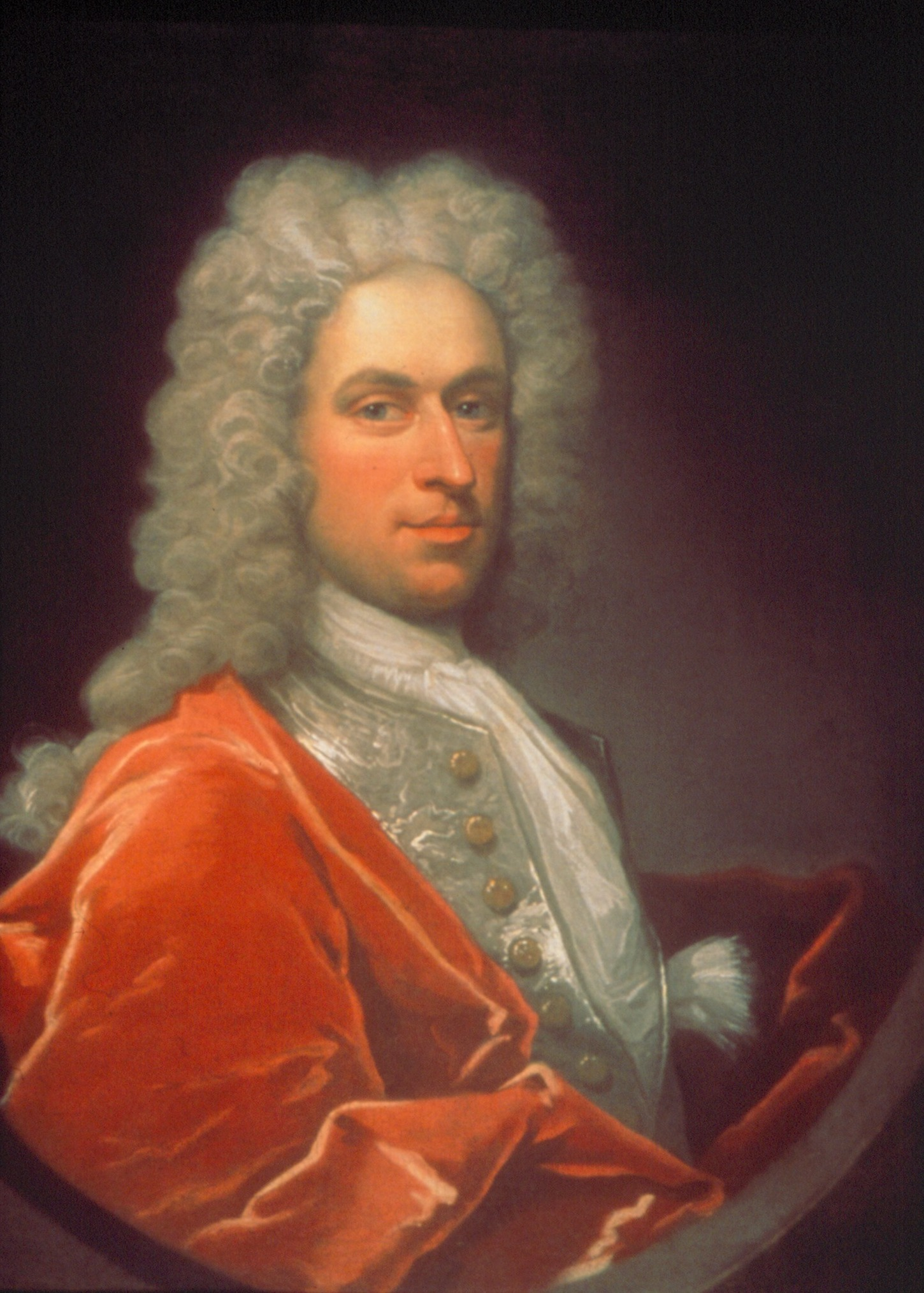
Thomas Lee, the first manager of the Ohio Company of Virginia

In 1671, General Abraham Wood, at the direction of Royal Governor William Berkeley of the Virginia Colony, sent a party from Fort Henry led by Thomas Batts and Robert Fallam to survey this territory. They were the first Europeans recorded as reaching Kanawha Falls. Some sources state that Governor Alexander Spotswood's 1716 Knights of the Golden Horseshoe Expedition (for which the state's Golden Horseshoe Competition for 8th graders is named) had penetrated as far as Pendleton County, but modern historians interpret the original accounts of the excursion as suggesting that none of the expedition's horsemen ventured much farther west of the Blue Ridge Mountains than Harrisonburg, Virginia. John Van Metre, a Native trader, penetrated into the northern portion in 1725. The same year, German settlers from Pennsylvania founded New Mecklenburg, the present Shepherdstown, on the Potomac River, and others followed.

King Charles II of England, in 1661, granted to a company of gentlemen the land between the Potomac and Rappahannock rivers, known as the Northern Neck. Thomas Fairfax, 6th Lord Fairfax of Cameron ultimately took possession of this grant, and in 1746 a stone was erected at the source of the North Branch Potomac River to mark his grant's western limit. George Washington surveyed a considerable part of this land between 1748 and 1751. His diary recorded that there were already many squatters, largely of German origin, along the South Branch Potomac River.

Christopher Gist, a surveyor in the employ of the first Ohio Company, which was composed chiefly of Virginians, explored the country along the Ohio River north of the mouth of the Kanawha River between 1751 and 1752. The company sought to have a 14th colony established with the name "Vandalia". Many settlers crossed the mountains after 1750, though they were hindered by Native American resistance. Few Native Americans lived permanently within the state's present limits, but the region was a common hunting ground, crossed by many trails. During the French and Indian War (the North American front of the Seven Years' War in Europe), Native allies of the French nearly destroyed the scattered British settlements.

Shortly before the American Revolutionary War, in 1774 Crown Governor of Virginia John Murray, 4th Earl of Dunmore, led a force over the mountains. A body of militia under then-Colonel Andrew Lewis dealt the Shawnee Natives, under Hokoleskwa (or "Cornstalk"), a crushing blow during the Battle of Point Pleasant at the junction of the Kanawha and the Ohio rivers. At the Treaty of Camp Charlotte concluding Dunmore's War, Cornstalk agreed to recognize the Ohio River as the new boundary with the "Long Knives". But by 1776 the Shawnee returned to war, joining the Chickamauga, a band of Cherokee known for the area where they lived. Native American attacks on settlers continued until after the American Revolutionary War. During the war, the settlers in western Virginia were generally active Whigs; many served in the Continental Army. Claypool's Rebellion of 1780–1781, in which a group of men refused to pay taxes to the Continental Army, showed war-weariness in what became West Virginia.

=== Trans-Allegheny Virginia ===
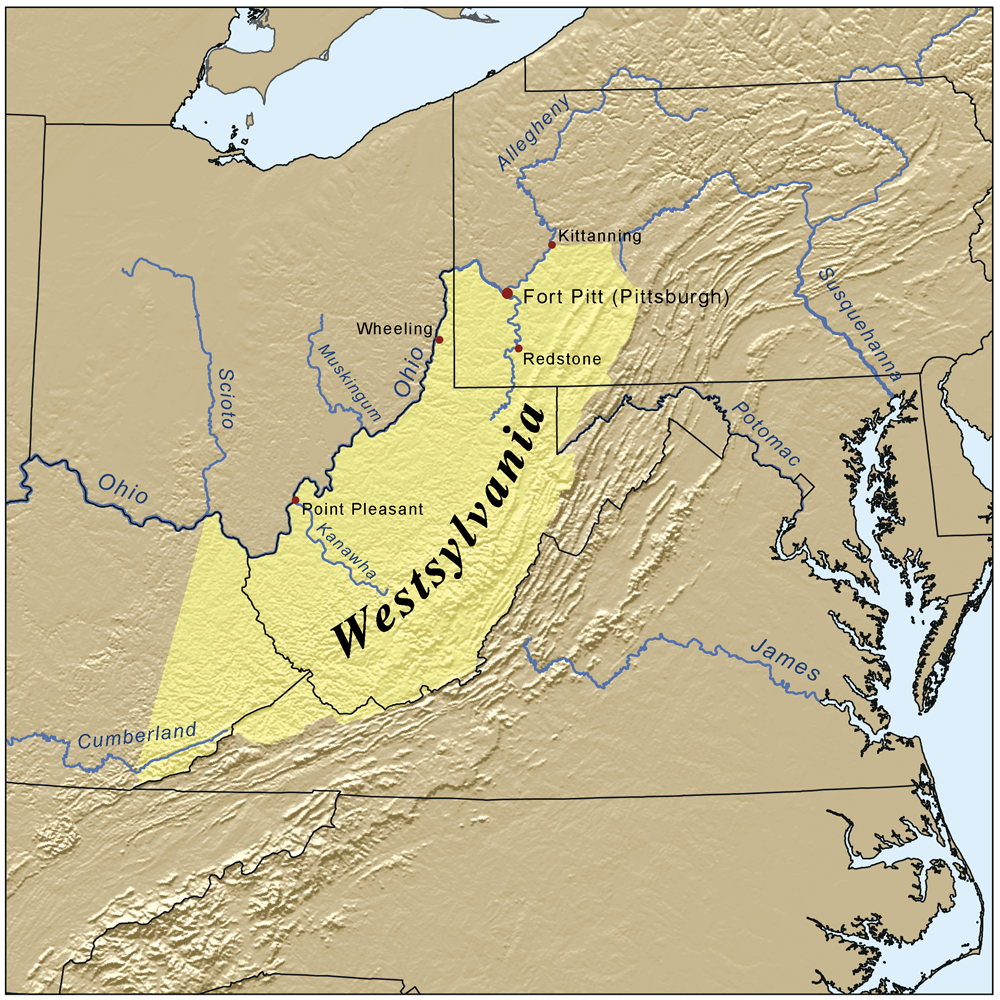
State of Westsylvania proposed to the U.S. Congress

Social conditions in western Virginia were entirely unlike those in the eastern part. The population was not homogeneous, as a considerable part of the immigration came by way of Pennsylvania and included Germans, Protestant Scotch-Irish, and settlers from states farther north. Counties in the east and south were settled mostly by eastern Virginians. During the American Revolution, the movement to create a state beyond the Alleghenies was revived and a petition for the establishment of "Westsylvania" was presented to Congress, on the grounds that the mountains presented an almost impassable barrier to the east. The rugged terrain made slavery unprofitable, and time only increased the social, political, economic, and cultural differences (see Tuckahoes and Cohees) between Virginia's two sections.

In 1829, a constitutional convention met in Richmond to consider reforms to Virginia's outdated constitution. Philip Doddridge of Brooke County championed the cause of western Virginians who sought a more democratic frame of government, but western reforms were rejected by leaders from east of the Alleghenies who "clung to political power in an effort to preserve their plantation lifestyles dependent on enslaving blacks". Virginia leaders maintained a property qualification for suffrage, effectively disenfranchising poorer farmers in the west whose families did much of the farm work themselves. In addition, the 1829–30 convention gave slaveholding counties the benefit of three-fifths of their slave population in apportioning the state's representation in the U.S. House of Representatives. As a result, every county west of the Alleghenies except one voted to reject the constitution, which nevertheless passed because of eastern support. The eastern planter elite's failure to make constitutional reforms exacerbated existing east–west sectionalism in Virginia and contributed to its division.

The Virginia Constitutional Convention of 1850–51, the Reform Convention, addressed a number of issues important to western Virginians. It extended the vote to all white males 21 years or older. The governor, lieutenant governor, the judiciary, sheriffs, and other county officers were to be elected by public vote. The General Assembly's composition was changed. Representation in the House of Delegates was apportioned based on the census of 1850, counting whites only. The Senate representation was arbitrarily fixed at 50 seats, with the west receiving 20 senators and the east 30. This was made acceptable to the west by a provision that required the General Assembly to reapportion representation based on the white population in 1865, or else put the matter to a public referendum. But the east also gave itself a tax advantage in requiring a property tax at true and actual value, except for slaves. Slaves under age 12 were not taxed and slaves over that age were taxed at only $300, a fraction of their true value, but small farmers had all their assets, animals, and land taxed at full value. Despite this tax and the lack of internal improvements in the west, the vote was 75,748 for and 11,063 against the new constitution. Most of the opposition came from delegates from eastern counties, who did not like the compromises made for the west.

Given these differences, many in the west had long contemplated a separate state. In particular, men such as lawyer Francis H. Pierpont from Fairmont had long chafed under the Tidewater and Piedmont slaveholders' political dominance. In addition to differences over slavery, he and allies felt the Virginia government ignored and refused to spend funds on needed internal improvements in the west, such as turnpikes and railroads.

=== Separation from Virginia ===
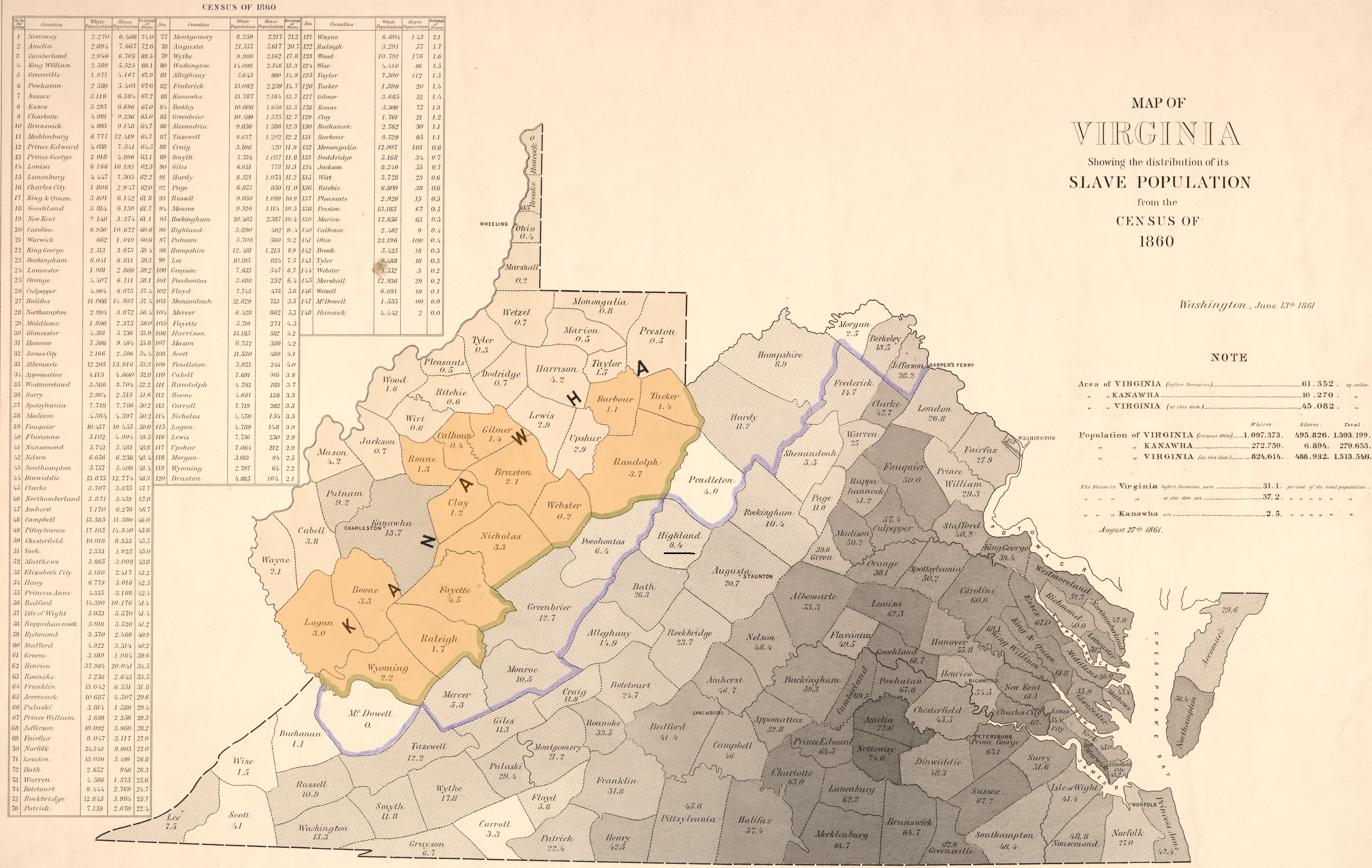
Map of Virginia dated June 13, 1861, featuring the percentage of slave population within each county at the 1860 census and the proposed state of Kanawha

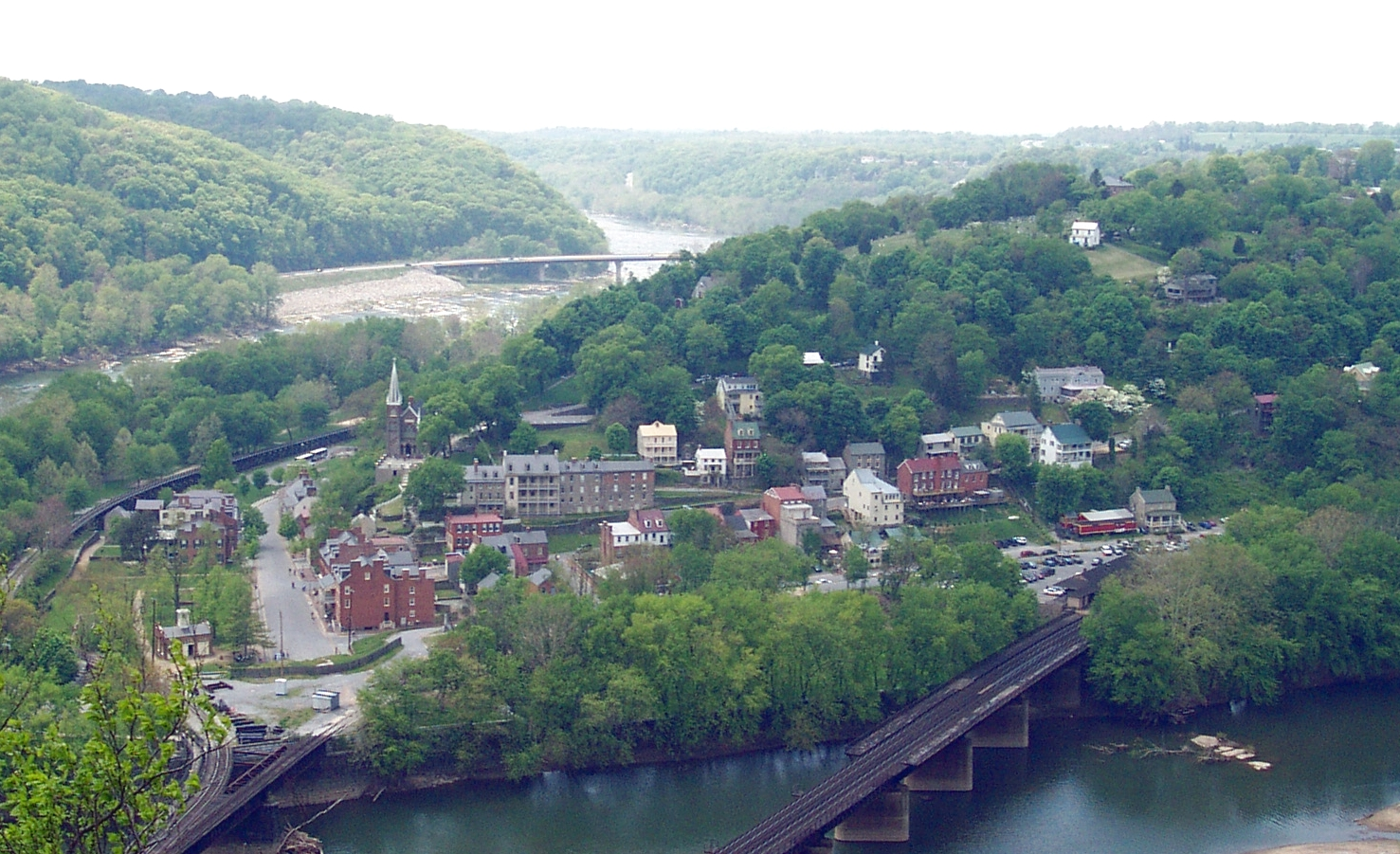
Harpers Ferry alternated between Confederate and Union rule eight times during the American Civil War, and was finally annexed by West Virginia.

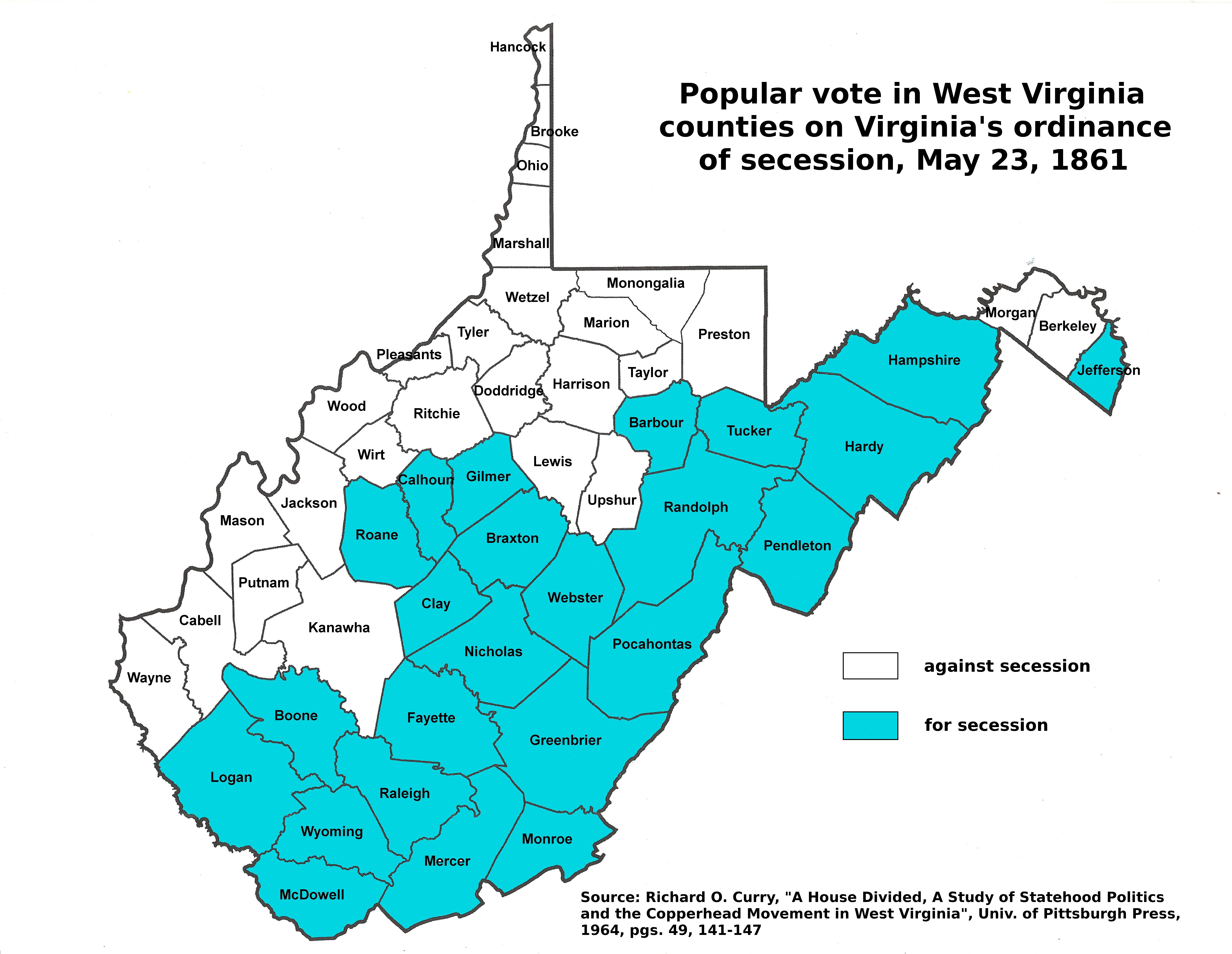
County votes on Virginia's secession ordinance May 23, 1861

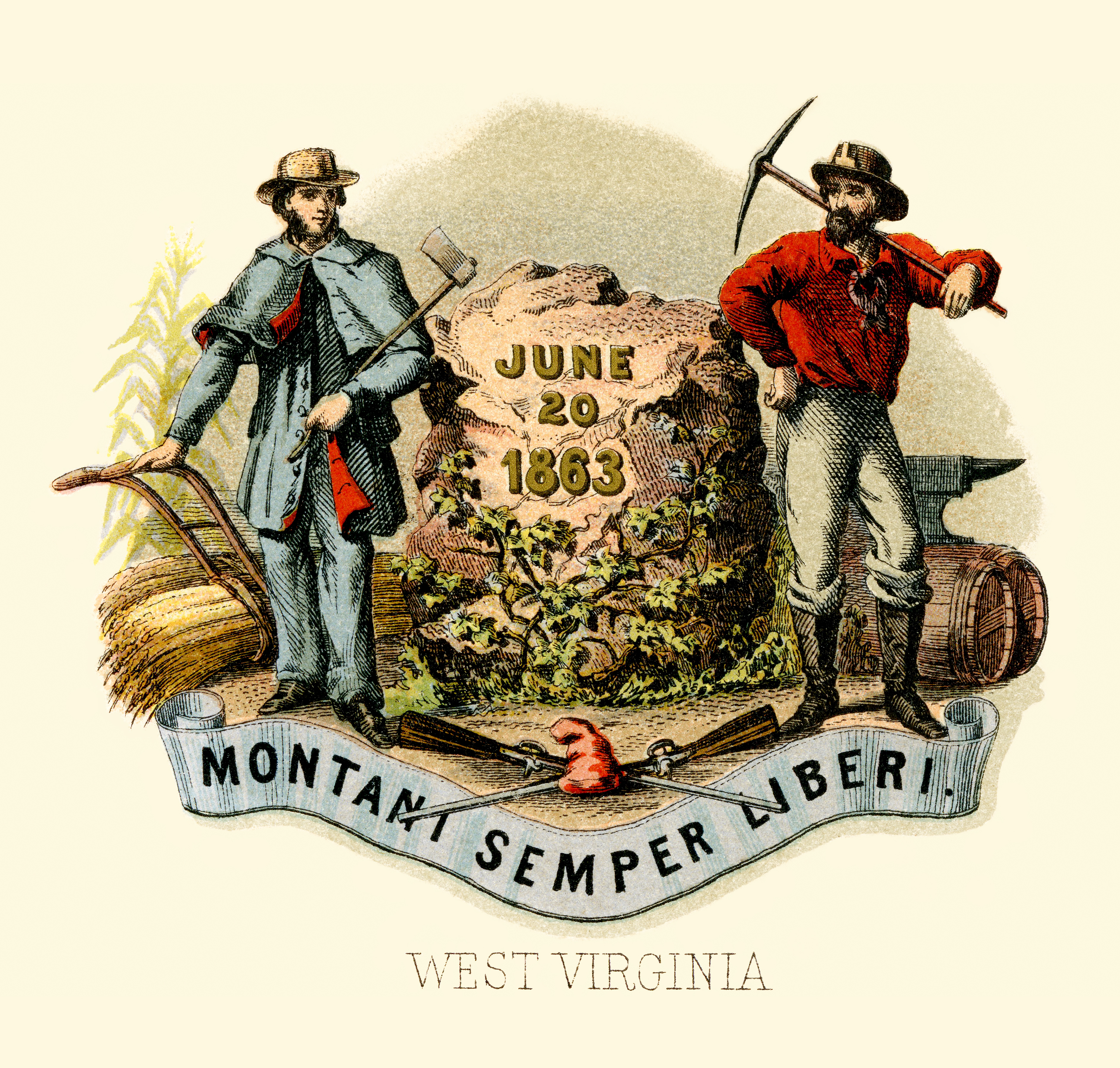
Historical coat of arms of West Virginia (illustrated, 1876)

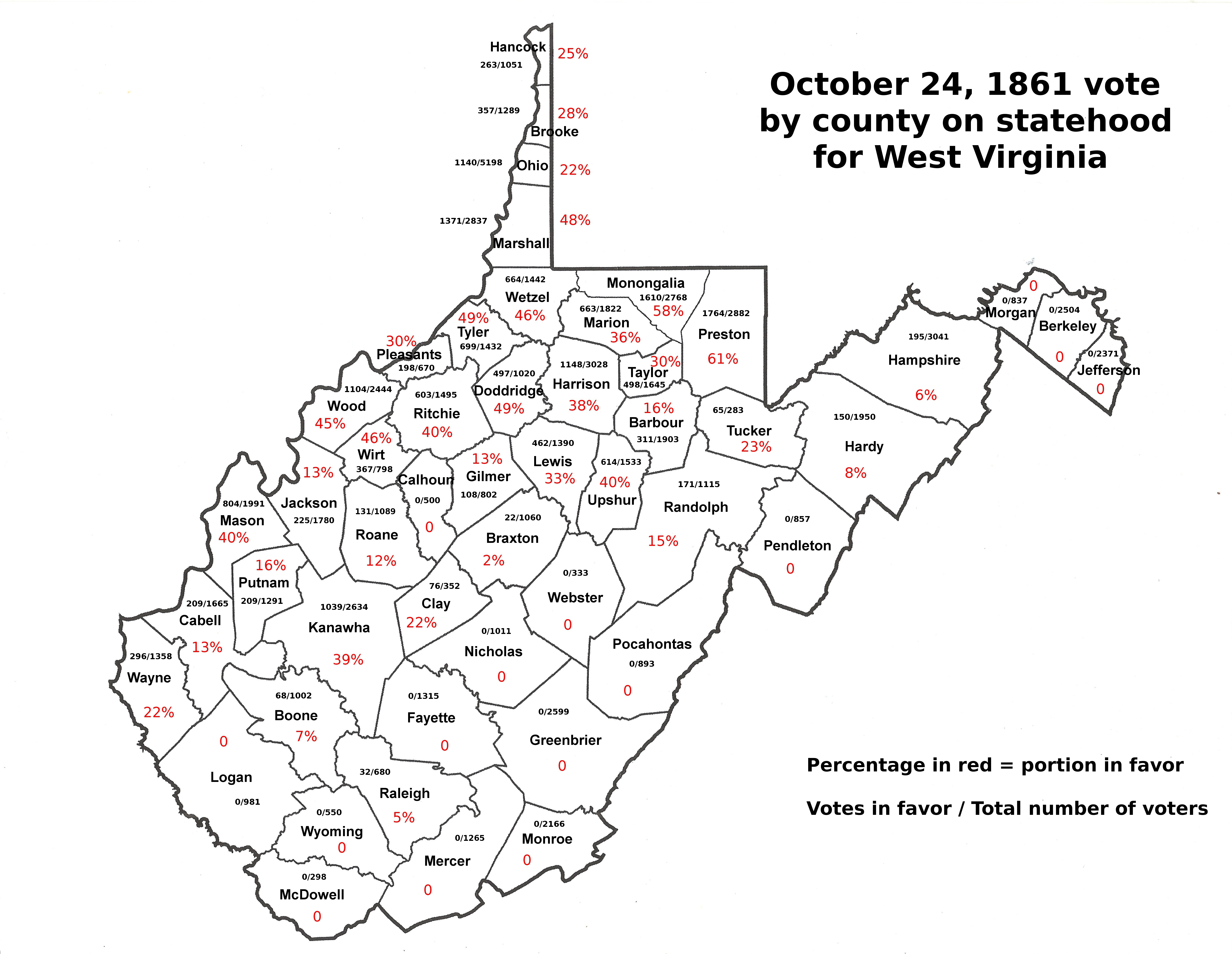
Votes by county in the October 1861 statehood vote

West Virginia was the only state in the Union to separate from a Confederate state (Virginia) during the Civil War. In Richmond on April 17, 1861, the Virginia Secession Convention of 1861 voted to secede from the Union. Of the 49 delegates from the northwestern counties (which ultimately became West Virginia) 15 voted in favor of the Ordinance of Secession, while 30 voted against it, with 4 absent or abstaining. However, when the convention reconvened in June a majority of those delegates returned to Richmond and signed the ordinance. Of the 49 original delegates 29 signed the ordinance. Almost immediately after that vote, a mass meeting at Clarksburg recommended that each county in northwestern Virginia send delegates to a convention to meet in Wheeling on May 13, 1861. When this First Wheeling Convention met, 425 delegates from 25 counties were present, though more than one-third of the delegates were from the northern panhandle area. Soon there was a division of sentiment.

Some delegates led by pro-Union slaveowner John S. Carlile favored the immediate formation of a new state, while others led by Waitman Willey argued that, as Virginia's secession had not yet been passed by the required referendum (as happened on May 23), such action would constitute revolution against the United States. (Note: The United States Constitution provides that no state may be divided without its consent.) The convention decided that if Virginians adopted the secession ordinance (of which there was little doubt), another convention including the members-elect of the legislature would meet in Wheeling in June 1861. On May 23, 1861, secession was ratified by a large majority in Virginia as a whole, but in the western counties 34,677 voted against and 19,121 voted for the ordinance. Of the 50 counties that became West Virginia 26 voted against the secession ordinance while 24 voted in favor of it.

The Second Wheeling Convention met as agreed on June 11 and declared that, since the Secession Convention had been called without popular consent, all its acts were void and all who adhered to it had vacated their offices. The Wheeling Conventions, and the delegates themselves, were never actually elected by public ballot to act on behalf of western Virginia. Of its 103 members, 33 had been elected to the Virginia General Assembly on May 23. This included some hold-over state senators whose four-year terms had begun in 1859, and some who vacated their offices to convene in Wheeling. Other members "were chosen even more irregularly—some in mass meetings, others by county committee, and still others were seemingly self-appointed". An act for the reorganization of the government was passed on June 19. The next day, convention delegates chose Francis H. Pierpont as governor of Virginia and elected other officers to a rival state government and two U.S. senators (Willey and Carlile) to replace secessionists before adjourning. The federal government promptly recognized the new government and seated the two new senators. Thus there were two state governments in Virginia: one pledging allegiance to the United States and one to the Confederacy.

The second Wheeling Convention had recessed until August 6, then reassembled on August 20 and called for a popular vote on the formation of a new state and for a convention to frame a constitution if the vote were favorable. In the October 24, 1861, election, 18,408 votes were cast for the new state and 781 against. The election results were questioned since the Union army then occupied the area and Union troops were stationed at many of the polls to prevent Confederate sympathizers from voting. This was also election day for local offices, and elections were also held in camps of Confederate soldiers, who elected rival state officials, such as Robert E. Cowan. Most pro-statehood votes came from 16 counties around the northern panhandle. Over 50,000 votes had been cast on the Ordinance of Secession, yet the vote on statehood garnered little more than 19,000. In Ohio County, home to Wheeling, only about a fourth of the registered voters cast votes. In most of what would become West Virginia, there was no vote at all, as two-thirds of the territory of West Virginia had voted for secession, and county officers remained loyal to Richmond. Votes recorded from pro-secession counties were mostly cast elsewhere by Unionist refugees from these counties.

Despite that controversy, delegates (including many Methodist ministers) met to write a constitution for the new state, beginning on November 26, 1861. During this constitutional convention, a Mr. Lamb of Ohio County and a Mr. Carskadon claimed that in Hampshire County, out of 195 votes only 39 were cast by citizens of the state; the rest were cast illegally by Union soldiers. One of the key figures was Gordon Battelle, who also represented Ohio County, and who proposed resolutions to establish public schools, as well as to limit the movement of slaves into the new state, and to gradually abolish slavery. The education proposal succeeded, but the convention tabled the slavery proposals before finishing its work on February 18, 1862. The new constitution was more closely modeled on Ohio's than Virginia's, adopting a township model of government rather than the "courthouse cliques" of Virginia which Carlile criticized, and a compromise demanded by the Kanawha region (Charleston lawyers Benjamin Smith and Brown) allowed counties and municipalities to vote subsidies for railroads or other improvement organizations. The resulting instrument was ratified (18,162 for and 514 against) on April 11, 1862.

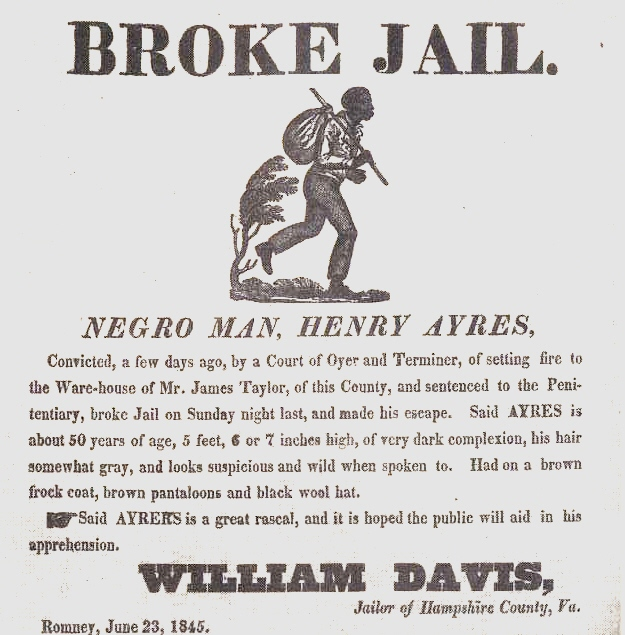
Escaped slave broadside, Hampshire County, West Virginia, 1845

On May 13, 1862, the state legislature of the reorganized government approved the formation of the new state. An application for admission to the Union was made to Congress, introduced by Senator Waitman Willey of the Restored Government of Virginia. Carlile sought to sabotage the bill, first trying to expand the new state's boundaries to include the Shenandoah Valley, and then to defeat the Willey amendment at home. On December 31, 1862, President Abraham Lincoln approved an enabling act admitting West Virginia on the condition that a provision for the gradual abolition of slavery be inserted in its constitution (as Battelle had urged in the Wheeling Intelligencer and also written to Lincoln). While many felt West Virginia's admission as a state was both illegal and unconstitutional, Lincoln issued his Opinion on the Admission of West Virginia finding that "the body which consents to the admission of West Virginia is the Legislature of Virginia", and that its admission was therefore both constitutional and expedient.

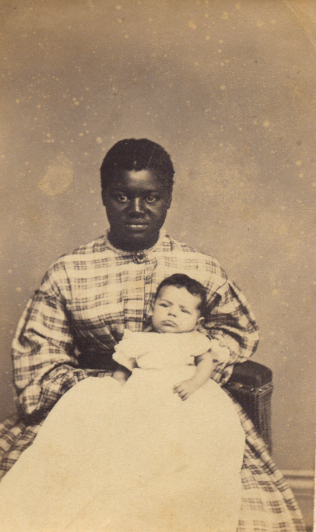
A slave woman tending to a white baby in West Virginia, 1865

The convention was reconvened on February 12, 1863, and the abolition demand of the federal enabling act was met. The revised constitution was adopted on March 26, 1863, and on April 20, 1863, Lincoln issued a proclamation admitting the state 60 days later on June 20, 1863. Meanwhile, officers for the new state were chosen, while Pierpont moved his pro-Union Virginia capital to Union-occupied Alexandria, where he asserted and exercised jurisdiction over all the remaining Virginia counties within the federal lines.

The question of the constitutionality of the formation of the new state was later brought before the Supreme Court of the United States in Virginia v. West Virginia. Berkeley and Jefferson counties, lying on the Potomac east of the mountains, voted in favor of annexation to West Virginia in 1863, with the consent of Virginia's reorganized government.

Many voters of the strongly pro-secessionist counties were absent in the Confederate Army when the vote was taken and refused to acknowledge the transfer when they returned. The Virginia General Assembly repealed the act of secession and in 1866 brought suit against West Virginia asking the court to declare the counties part of Virginia, which would have made West Virginia's admission as a state unconstitutional. Meanwhile, on March 10, 1866, Congress passed a joint resolution recognizing the transfer. The Supreme Court decided in West Virginia's favor in 1870.

==== Claims by Maryland ====
The original charters for Maryland and Virginia were silent as to which branch of the upper Potomac was the boundary. This was settled by the 1785 Mount Vernon Conference. Nevertheless, when West Virginia seceded from Virginia, Maryland claimed West Virginia land north of the South Branch (all of Mineral and Grant Counties and parts of Hampshire, Hardy, Tucker and Pendleton Counties). The Supreme Court rejected these claims in two separate decisions in 1910.

=== In the Civil War ===
During the Civil War, Union General George B. McClellan's forces gained possession of the greater part of the territory in the summer of 1861, culminating at the Battle of Rich Mountain, and Union control was never again seriously threatened. In 1863, General John D. Imboden, with 5,000 Confederates, raided a considerable portion of the state and burned Pierpont's library, although Willey escaped their grasp. Bands of guerrillas burned and plundered in some sections, and were not entirely suppressed until the war ended. The eastern panhandle counties were more affected by the war, with military control of the area repeatedly changing hands.

The area that became West Virginia actually furnished about an equal number of soldiers to the Union and Confederate armies, about 22,000–25,000 each. In 1865, the Wheeling government found it necessary to strip voting rights from returning Confederates in order to retain control. James Ferguson, who proposed the law, said if it was not enacted he would lose the election by 500 votes. Confederates' property might also be confiscated, and in 1866 a constitutional amendment disfranchising all who had given aid and comfort to the Confederacy was adopted. The addition of the Fourteenth and Fifteenth Amendments to the U.S. Constitution caused a reaction. The Democratic party secured control in 1870, and in 1871 the constitutional amendment of 1866 was abrogated. Republicans had taken the first steps toward this change in 1870. On August 22, 1872, an entirely new constitution was adopted.

Beginning in Reconstruction, and for several decades thereafter, the two states disputed the new state's share of the prewar Virginia government's debts, which had mostly been incurred to finance public infrastructure improvements, such as canals, roads, and railroads under the Virginia Board of Public Works. Virginians—led by former Confederate general William Mahone—formed a political coalition based upon this: the Readjuster Party. West Virginia's first constitution provided for the assumption of a part of the Virginia debt, but negotiations opened by Virginia in 1870 were fruitless, and in 1871 Virginia funded two-thirds of the debt and arbitrarily assigned the remainder to West Virginia. The issue was finally settled in 1915, when the Supreme Court of the United States ruled that West Virginia owed Virginia $12,393,929.50. The final installment of this sum was paid in 1939.

=== Development of natural resources ===
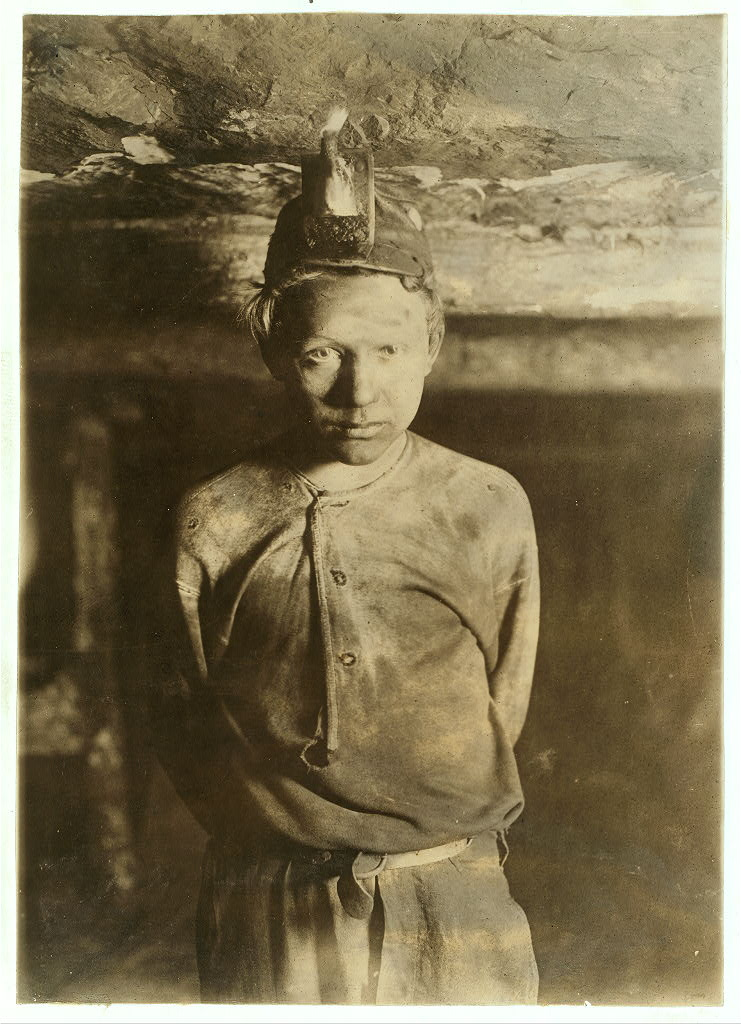
Child laborer photographed by Lewis Hine in the coal mines of West Virginia, 1908

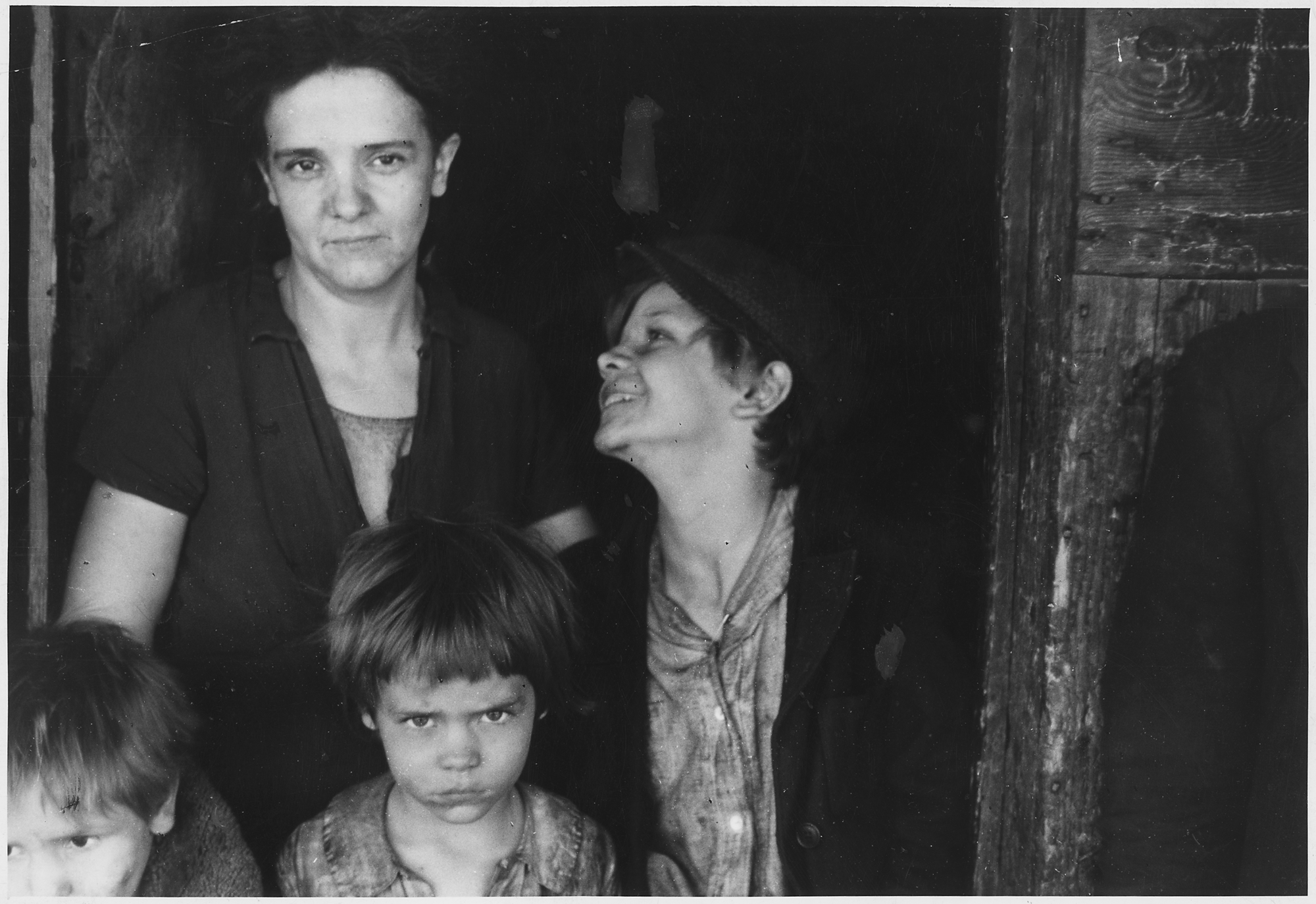
Family of a coal miner, c. 1935

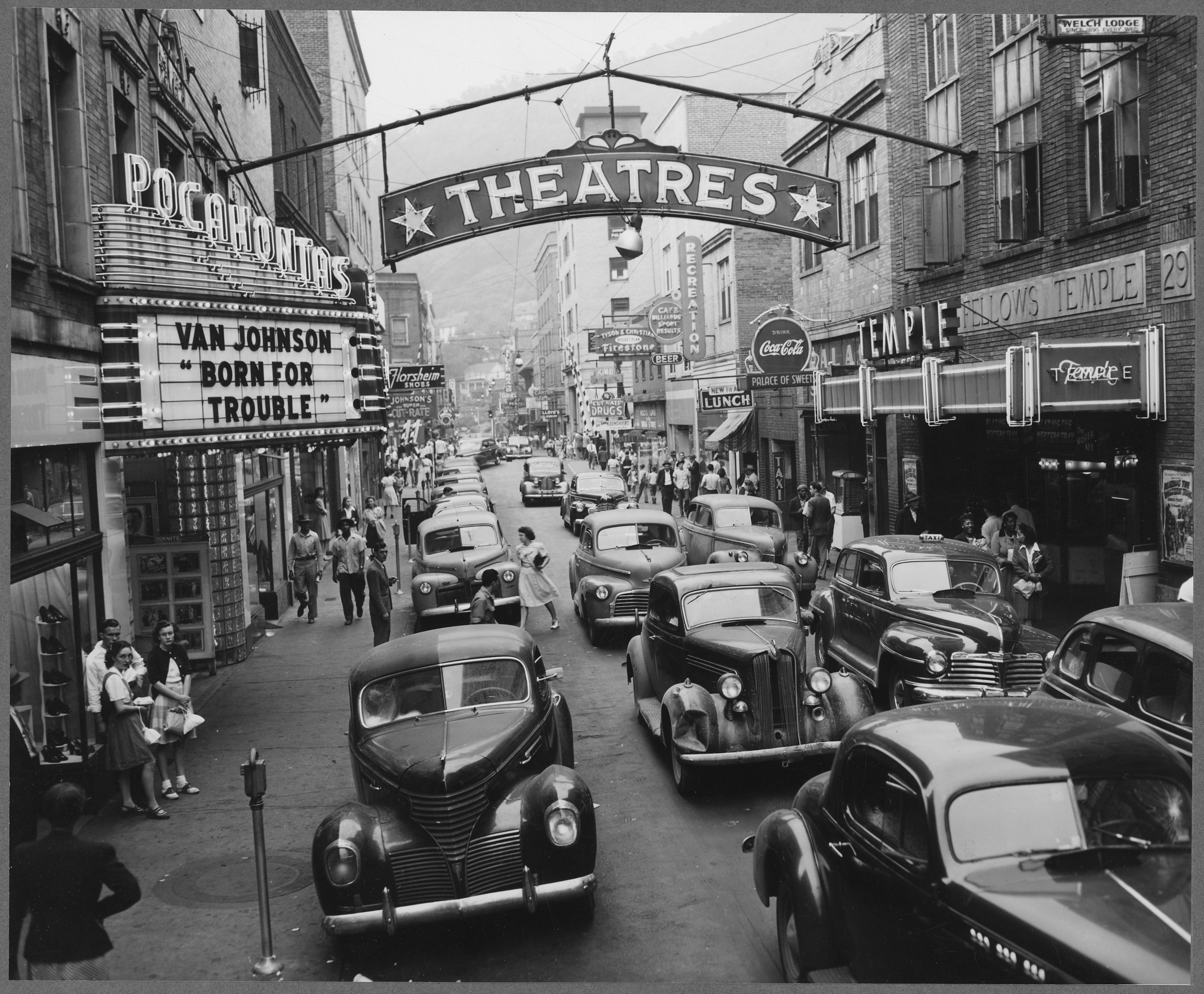
Saturday afternoon street scene, Welch, McDowell County, 1946

After Reconstruction, the new 35th state benefited from the development of its mineral resources more than any other single economic activity.

Saltpeter caves had been employed throughout Appalachia for munitions; the border between West Virginia and Virginia includes the "Saltpeter Trail", a string of limestone caverns containing rich deposits of calcium nitrate which were rendered and sold to the government. The trail stretched from Pendleton County to the western terminus of the route in the town of Union, Monroe County. Nearly half of these caves are on the West Virginia side, including Organ Cave and Haynes Cave. In the late 18th century, saltpeter miners in Haynes Cave found large animal bones in the deposits. These were sent by a local historian and frontier soldier Colonel John Stuart to Thomas Jefferson. The bones were named Megalonyx jeffersonii, or great-claw, and became known as Jefferson's three-toed sloth. It was declared the official state fossil of West Virginia in 2008. The West Virginia official state rock is bituminous coal, and the official state gemstone is silicified Mississippian fossil Lithostrotionella coral.

The limestone also produced a useful quarry industry. Usually small, and softer, high-calcium seams were burned to produce industrial lime. This lime was used for agricultural and construction purposes; for many years a specific portion of the C & O Railroad carried limestone rock to Clifton Forge, Virginia as an industrial flux.

Salt mining had been underway since the 18th century, though it had largely played out by the time of the American Civil War, when the red salt of Kanawha County was a valued commodity of first Confederate, and later Union, forces. In the years following, more sophisticated mining methods would restore West Virginia's role as a major producer of salt.

However, in the second half of the 19th century, there was an even greater treasure not yet developed: bituminous coal. It would fuel much of the Industrial Revolution in the U.S. and the steamships of many of the world's navies.

The residents (both Native Americans and early European settlers) had long known of the underlying coal, and that it could be used for heating and fuel. However, for a long time, "personal" or artisanal mining was the only practical development. After the War, with the new railroads came a practical method to transport large quantities of coal to expanding U.S. and export markets. As the anthracite mines of northwestern New Jersey and Pennsylvania began to play out during this same time period, investors and industrialists focused new interest in West Virginia. Geologists such as Dr. David T. Ansted surveyed potential coal fields and invested in land and early mining projects.

The completion of the Chesapeake and Ohio Railway (C&O) across the state to the new city of Huntington on the Ohio River in 1872 opened access to the New River Coal Field. Soon, the C&O was building its huge coal pier at Newport News, Virginia, on the large harbor of Hampton Roads. In 1881, the new Philadelphia-based owners of the former Atlantic, Mississippi and Ohio Railroad (AM&O), which stretched across Virginia's southern tier from Norfolk, had sights clearly set on West Virginia, where the owners had large landholdings. Their railroad was renamed Norfolk and Western (N&W), and a new railroad city was developed at Roanoke to handle planned expansion. After its new president Frederick J. Kimball and a small party journeyed by horseback and saw firsthand the rich bituminous coal seam, which Kimball's wife named Pocahontas, the N&W redirected its planned westward expansion to reach it. Soon, the N&W was also shipping from new coal piers at Hampton Roads.

In 1889, in the southern part of the state, along the Norfolk and Western rail lines, the important coal center of Bluefield, West Virginia, was founded. The "capital" of the Pocahontas coalfield, this city would remain the largest city in the southern portion of the state for several decades. It shares its name with a sister city, Bluefield, in Virginia.

In the northern portion of the state and elsewhere, the older Baltimore and Ohio Railroad (B&O) and other lines also expanded to take advantage of coal opportunities. The B&O developed coal piers in Baltimore and at several points on the Great Lakes. Other significant rail carriers of coal were the Western Maryland Railway (WM), Southern Railway (SOU), and the Louisville and Nashville Railroad (L&N).

Particularly notable was a latecomer, the Virginian Railway (VGN). By 1900, only the most rugged terrain of southern West Virginia was any distance from the existing railroads and mining activity. Within this area west of the New River Coalfield in Raleigh and Wyoming counties lay the Winding Gulf Coalfield, later promoted as the "Billion Dollar Coalfield".

A protégé of Dr. Ansted was William Nelson Page (1854–1932), a civil engineer and mining manager in Fayette County. Former West Virginia governor William A. MacCorkle described him as a man who knew the land "as a farmer knows a field". Beginning in 1898, Page teamed with northern and European-based investors to take advantage of the undeveloped area. They acquired large tracts of land in the area, and Page began the Deepwater Railway, a short-line railroad chartered to stretch between the C&O at its line along the Kanawha River and the N&W at Matoaka—a distance of about 80 miles (130 km).

Although the Deepwater plan should have provided a competitive shipping market via either railroad, leaders of the two large railroads did not appreciate the scheme. In secret collusion, each declined to negotiate favorable rates with Page, nor did they offer to purchase his railroad, as they had many other short-lines. However, if the C&O and N&W presidents thought they could thus kill the Page project, they were to be proved mistaken. One of the silent partner investors Page had enlisted was millionaire industrialist Henry Huttleston Rogers, a principal in John D. Rockefeller's Standard Oil Trust and an old hand at developing natural resources and transportation. A master at competitive "warfare", Henry Rogers did not like to lose in his endeavors and also had "deep pockets".

Instead of giving up, Page (and Rogers) quietly planned and then built their tracks all the way east across Virginia, using Rogers' private fortune to finance the $40 million cost. When the renamed Virginian Railway (VGN) was completed in 1909, no fewer than three railroads were shipping ever-increasing volumes of coal to export from Hampton Roads. West Virginia coal was also in high demand at Great Lakes ports. The VGN and the N&W ultimately became parts of the modern Norfolk Southern system, and the VGN's well-engineered 20th-century tracks continue to offer a favorable gradient to Hampton Roads.

As coal mining and related work became major employment activities in the state, there was considerable labor strife as working conditions, safety issues and economic concerns arose. Even in the 21st century, mining safety and ecological concerns are still challenging to the state whose coal continues to power electrical generating plants in many other states.

Coal is not the only valuable mineral found in West Virginia, as the state was the site of the 1928 discovery of the 34.48 carat (6.896 g) Jones Diamond.

== Geography ==
West Virginia is situated in the Appalachian Mountains, bounded by Allegheny Mountains, Ohio and Big Sandy rivers, and the Cumberland Mountains.

Located in the Appalachian Mountains, West Virginia covers an area of 24,229.76 square miles (62,754.8 km^{2}), with 24,077.73 square miles (62,361.0 km^{2}) of land and 152.03 square miles (393.8 km^{2}) of water, making it the 41st-largest state in the United States. West Virginia borders Pennsylvania and Maryland in the northeast, Virginia in the southeast, Ohio in the northwest, and Kentucky in the southwest. Its longest border is with Virginia at 381 miles (613 km), followed by Ohio at 243 miles (391 km), Maryland at 174 miles (280 km), Pennsylvania at 118 miles (190 km), and Kentucky at 79 miles (127 km).

=== Geology and terrain ===
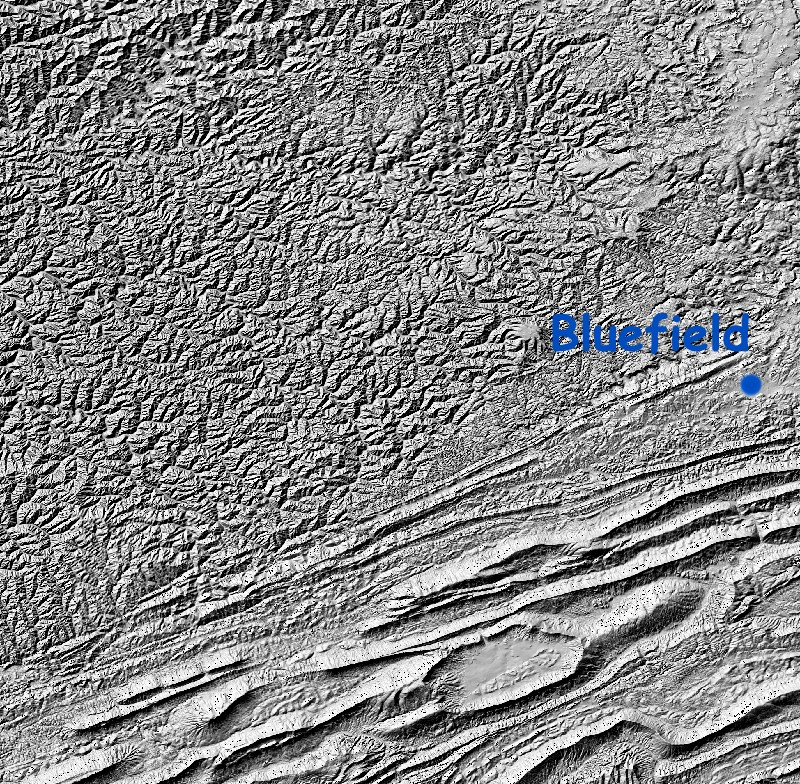
Shaded relief map of the Cumberland Plateau and Ridge-and-valley Appalachians

West Virginia is located entirely within the Appalachian Region, and the state is almost entirely mountainous, giving the reason for the nickname The Mountain State and the motto Montani Semper Liberi ("Mountaineers are always free"). The elevations and ruggedness drop near large rivers like the Ohio River or Shenandoah River. About 75% of the state is within the Cumberland Plateau and Allegheny Plateau regions. Though the relief is not high, the plateau region is extremely rugged in most areas. The average elevation of West Virginia is approximately 1,500 feet (460 m) above sea level, which is the highest of any U.S. state east of the Mississippi River.

On the eastern state line with Virginia, high peaks in the Monongahela National Forest region give rise to an island of colder climate and ecosystems similar to those of northern New England and eastern Canada. The highest point in the state is atop Spruce Knob, at 4,863 feet (1,482 m), and is covered in a boreal forest of dense spruce trees at altitudes above 4,000 feet (1,200 m). Spruce Knob lies within the Monongahela National Forest and is a part of the Spruce Knob–Seneca Rocks National Recreation Area. A total of six wilderness areas can also be found within the forest. Outside the forest to the south, the New River Gorge is a canyon 1,000 feet (300 m) deep, carved by the New River. The National Park Service manages a portion of the gorge and river that has been designated as the New River Gorge National Park and Preserve.

Other areas under protection and management include:

- Appalachian National Scenic Trail
- Bluestone National Scenic River
- Canaan Valley National Wildlife Refuge
- Chesapeake and Ohio Canal National Historical Park
- Gauley River National Recreation Area
- George Washington National Forest
- Harpers Ferry National Historical Park
- Ohio River Islands National Wildlife Refuge

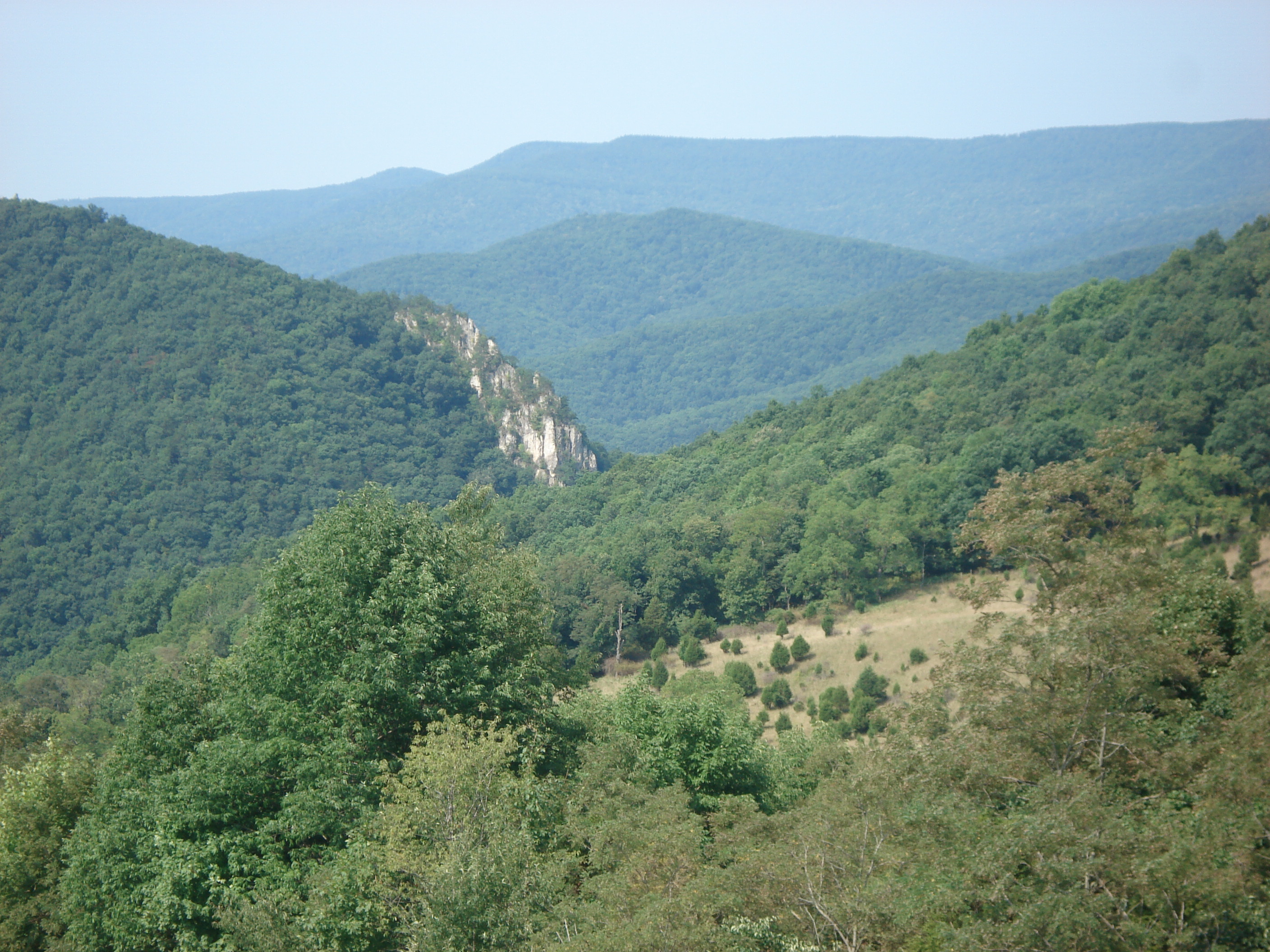
Spruce Knob (in the distance) is the highest point in West Virginia and the Allegheny Mountains.

Most of West Virginia lies within the Appalachian mixed mesophytic forests ecoregion, while the higher elevations along the eastern border and in the panhandle lie within the Appalachian–Blue Ridge forests. The native vegetation for most of the state was originally mixed hardwood forest of oak, chestnut, maple, beech, and white pine, with willow and American sycamore along the state's waterways. Many of the areas are rich in biodiversity and scenic beauty, a fact appreciated by native West Virginians, who refer to their home as Almost Heaven (from the song "Take Me Home, Country Roads" by John Denver). Before the song, it was known as "The Cog State" (Coal, Oil, and Gas) or "The Mountain State".

The underlying rock strata are Paleozoic Era sandstones, shales, bituminous coal beds, and limestones laid down in near-shore environments. The sandstones and shales were derived from sediments eroded from former mountains to the east, then deposited in a shallow inland sea to the west. The limestones were derived from biomineralizing marine organisms such as calcareous algae, brachiopods, and crinoids. Coals were formed in coastal swamp environments, and deltaic environments formed near the mouths of ancient rivers. Sea level rose and fell many times during the Carboniferous Period (Mississippian and Pennsylvanian Subperiods), yielding a variety of rock strata that dominate the bedrock today. The Appalachian Mountains, which are a major influence on the present-day geography of West Virginia, formed more than three hundred million years ago.

The State Fossil of West Virginia is the giant ground sloth Megalonyx jeffersonii, which lived during the Pleistocene Epoch (the most recent "Ice Age"). The genus was described by Thomas Jefferson in 1799 from remains collected in Haynes Cave, Monroe County, West Virginia. In 1799, that area was considered to belong to the western part of the State of Virginia. Megalonyx was the first genus of fossil vertebrate animal named from the United States.

=== Climate ===
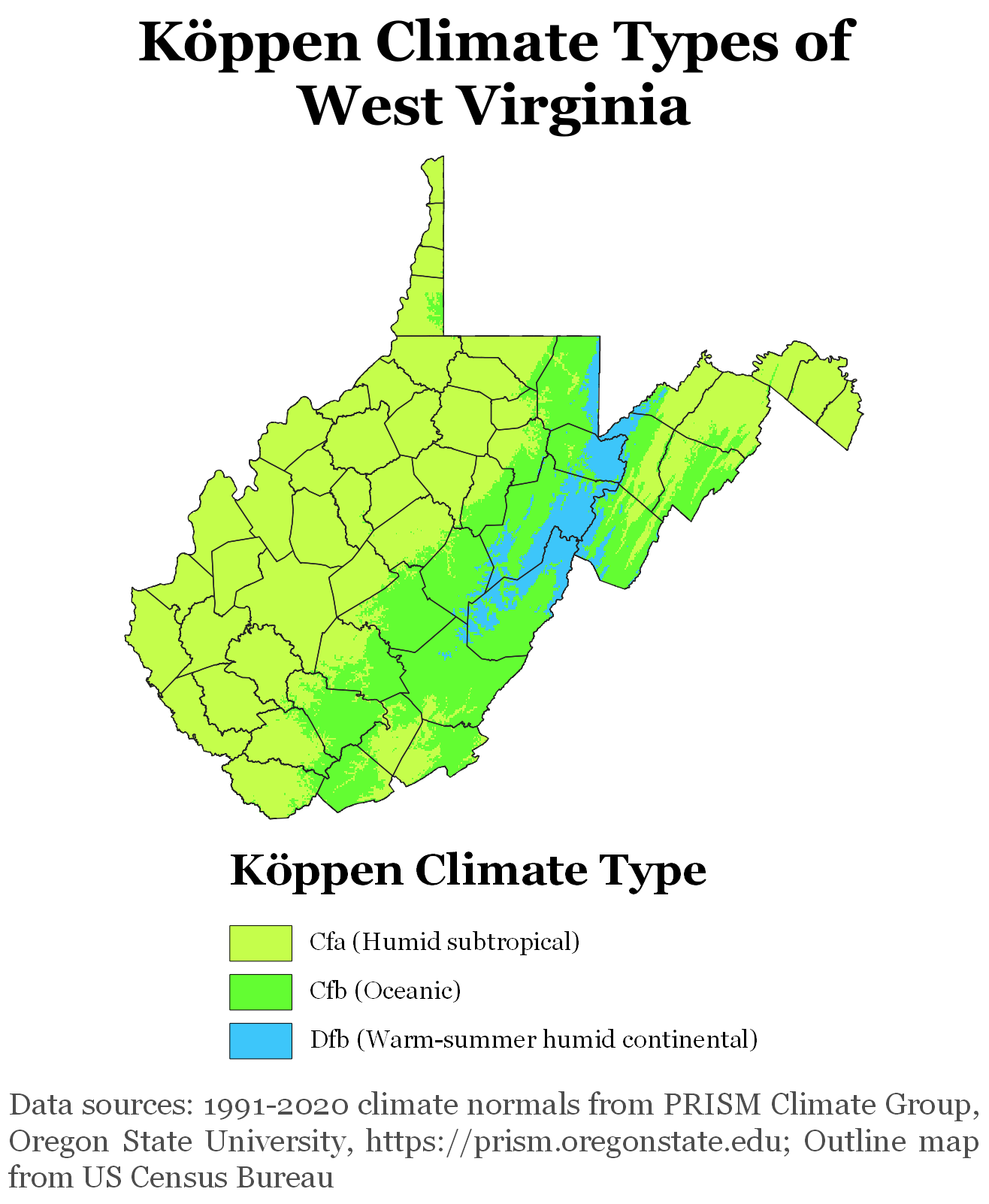
Köppen climate types of West Virginia, using 1991–2020 climate normals

West Virginia state-wide averages

Climate chart (precipitation, max. and min. temperature)
| J | F | M | A | M | J | J | A | S | O | N | D |
| 3.3 39 22 | 2.9 43 24 | 3.8 53 32 | 3.7 64 40 | 4.4 73 50 | 4 80 59 | 4.2 83 64 | 4 82 62 | 3.4 76 56 | 2.9 65 44 | 3.5 54 35 | 3.3 44 27 |
- █ Average max. and min. temperatures in °F
- █ Precipitation totals in inches
- Source: West Virginia University data
Metric conversion
| J | F | M | A | M | J | J | A | S | O | N | D |
| 84 4 −6 | 74 6 −4 | 97 12 0 | 94 18 4 | 112 23 10 | 102 27 15 | 107 28 18 | 102 28 17 | 86 24 13 | 74 18 7 | 89 12 2 | 84 7 −3 |
- █ Average max. and min. temperatures in °C
- █ Precipitation totals in mm

The climate of West Virginia is generally a humid subtropical climate (Köppen climate classification Cfa, except Dfb at the higher elevations) with warm to hot, humid summers and chilly winters, increasing in severity with elevation. Some southern highland areas also have a mountain temperate climate (Köppen Cfb) where winter temperatures are more moderate and summer temperatures are somewhat cooler. However, the weather is subject in all parts of the state to change. The hardiness zones range from zone 5b in the central Appalachian Mountains to zone 7a in the warmest parts of the lowest elevations.

In the eastern panhandle and the Ohio River valley, temperatures are warm enough to see and grow subtropical plants such as southern magnolia (Magnolia grandiflora), crepe myrtle, Albizia julibrissin, American sweetgum and even the occasional needle palm and sabal minor. These plants do not thrive as well in other parts of the state. The eastern prickly pear grows well in many portions of the state.

Average January temperatures range from around 26 °F (−4 °C) near the Cheat River to 41 °F (5 °C) along sections of the border with Kentucky. July averages range from 67 °F (19 °C) along the North Branch Potomac River to 76 °F (24 °C) in the western part of the state. It is cooler in the mountains than in the lower sections of the state. The highest recorded temperature in the state is 112 °F (44 °C) at Martinsburg on July 10, 1936, and the lowest recorded temperature in the state is −37 °F (−38 °C) at Lewisburg on December 30, 1917.

Annual precipitation ranges from less than 32 inches (810 mm) in the lower eastern section to more than 56 inches (1,400 mm) in higher parts of the Allegheny Front. Valleys in the east have lower rainfall because the Allegheny mountain ridges to the west create a partial rain shadow. Slightly more than half the rainfall occurs from April to September. Dense fogs are common in many valleys of the Kanawha section, especially the Tygart Valley. West Virginia is also one of the cloudiest states in the nation, with the cities of Elkins and Beckley ranking 9th and 10th in the U.S. respectively for the number of cloudy days per year (over 210). In addition to persistent cloudy skies caused by the damming of moisture by the Alleghenies, West Virginia also experiences some of the most frequent precipitation in the nation, with Snowshoe averaging nearly 200 days a year with either rain or snow. Snow usually lasts only a few days in the lower sections but may persist for weeks in the higher mountain areas. An average of 34 inches (860 mm) of snow falls annually in Charleston, although during the winter of 1995–1996 more than three times that amount fell as several cities in the state established new records for snowfall. Average snowfall in the Allegheny Highlands can range up to 180 inches (4,600 mm) per year. Severe weather is somewhat less prevalent in West Virginia than in most other eastern states, and it ranks among the least tornado-prone states east of the Rockies.

=== Major cities ===
There are 232 incorporated municipalities in West Virginia. Charleston is the state's capital and most populous city; the Charleston metropolitan area has approximately 200,000 residents. The Huntington–Ashland metropolitan area is anchored by Huntington, the state's second-most populous city. Other metro areas in the state include Morgantown, Wheeling, Weirton, Beckley, and Parkersburg–Vienna. Other metropolitan areas that contain cities in West Virginia, but are primarily in other states include Cumberland, Maryland; Hagerstown, Maryland; Washington, D.C.; and Winchester, Virginia. Another six cities function as the centers of micropolitan statistical areas, which are predominantly more rural: Bluefield, Clarksburg, Elkins, Fairmont, Logan, and Point Pleasant.

Originally, the state capital was located in Wheeling, from 1863 to 1870. It was then moved to Charleston, a more central city, from 1870 to 1875, when it returned to Wheeling. In 1885, the capitol burned down and it was moved back to Charleston that year, where a vote was held to determine the permanent capital between Charleston, Clarksburg, and Martinsburg. Charleston was selected, and it has remained the capital since.

Largest cities or towns in West Virginia Source:
| Rank | Name | County | Pop. | Rank | Name | County | Pop. |
|---|---|---|---|---|---|---|---|
| 1 | Charleston | Kanawha | 47,215 | 11 | South Charleston | Kanawha | 12,240 |
| 2 | Huntington | Cabell | 46,048 | 12 | Vienna | Wood | 10,230 |
| 3 | Morgantown | Monongalia | 30,955 | 13 | St. Albans | Kanawha | 10,069 |
| 4 | Parkersburg | Wood | 29,675 | 14 | Bluefield | Mercer | 9,730 |
| 5 | Wheeling | Ohio | 26,771 | 15 | Bridgeport | Harrison | 8,681 |
| 6 | Weirton | Hancock | 18,449 | 16 | Moundsville | Marshall | 8,401 |
| 7 | Fairmont | Marion | 18,411 | 17 | Oak Hill | Fayette | 8,218 |
| 8 | Martinsburg | Berkeley | 17,465 | 18 | Dunbar | Kanawha | 7,205 |
| 9 | Beckley | Raleigh | 16,183 | 19 | Elkins | Randolph | 7,026 |
| 10 | Clarksburg | Harrison | 15,480 | 20 | Hurricane | Putnam | 6,506 |

== Demographics ==
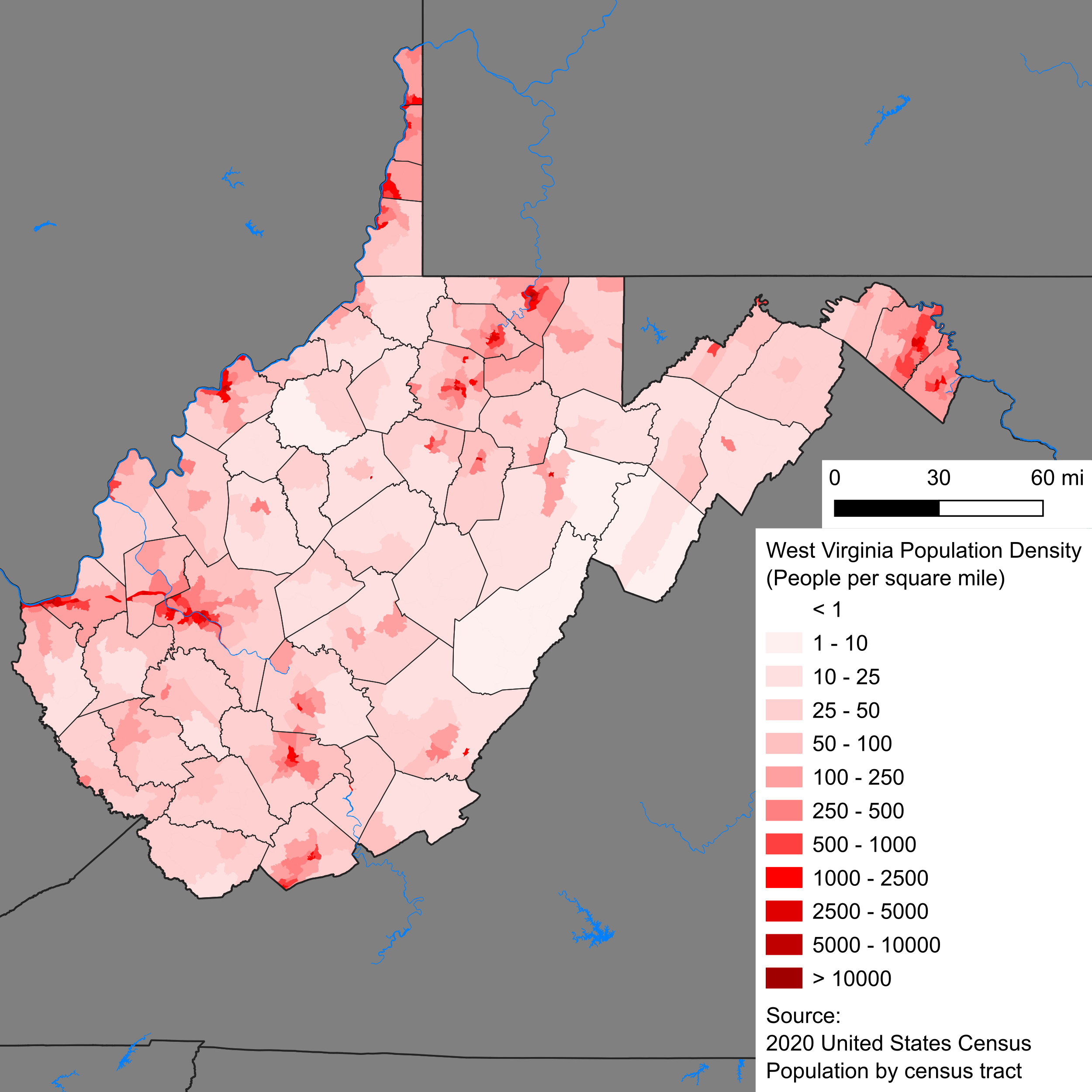
West Virginia population density 2020

Historical population
| Census | Pop. | Note | %± |
|---|---|---|---|
| 1790 | 55,873 | | — |
| 1800 | 78,592 | | 40.7% |
| 1810 | 105,469 | | 34.2% |
| 1820 | 136,808 | | 29.7% |
| 1830 | 176,924 | | 29.3% |
| 1840 | 224,537 | | 26.9% |
| 1850 | 302,313 | | 34.6% |
| 1860 | 376,688 | | 24.6% |
| 1870 | 442,014 | | 17.3% |
| 1880 | 618,457 | | 39.9% |
| 1890 | 762,794 | | 23.3% |
| 1900 | 958,800 | | 25.7% |
| 1910 | 1,221,119 | | 27.4% |
| 1920 | 1,463,701 | | 19.9% |
| 1930 | 1,729,205 | | 18.1% |
| 1940 | 1,901,974 | | 10.0% |
| 1950 | 2,005,552 | | 5.4% |
| 1960 | 1,860,421 | | −7.2% |
| 1970 | 1,744,237 | | −6.2% |
| 1980 | 1,949,644 | | 11.8% |
| 1990 | 1,793,477 | | −8.0% |
| 2000 | 1,808,344 | | 0.8% |
| 2010 | 1,852,994 | | 2.5% |
| 2020 | 1,793,716 | | −3.2% |
| 2025 (est.) | 1,766,147 | | −1.5% |
Source:1910–2020; 2024

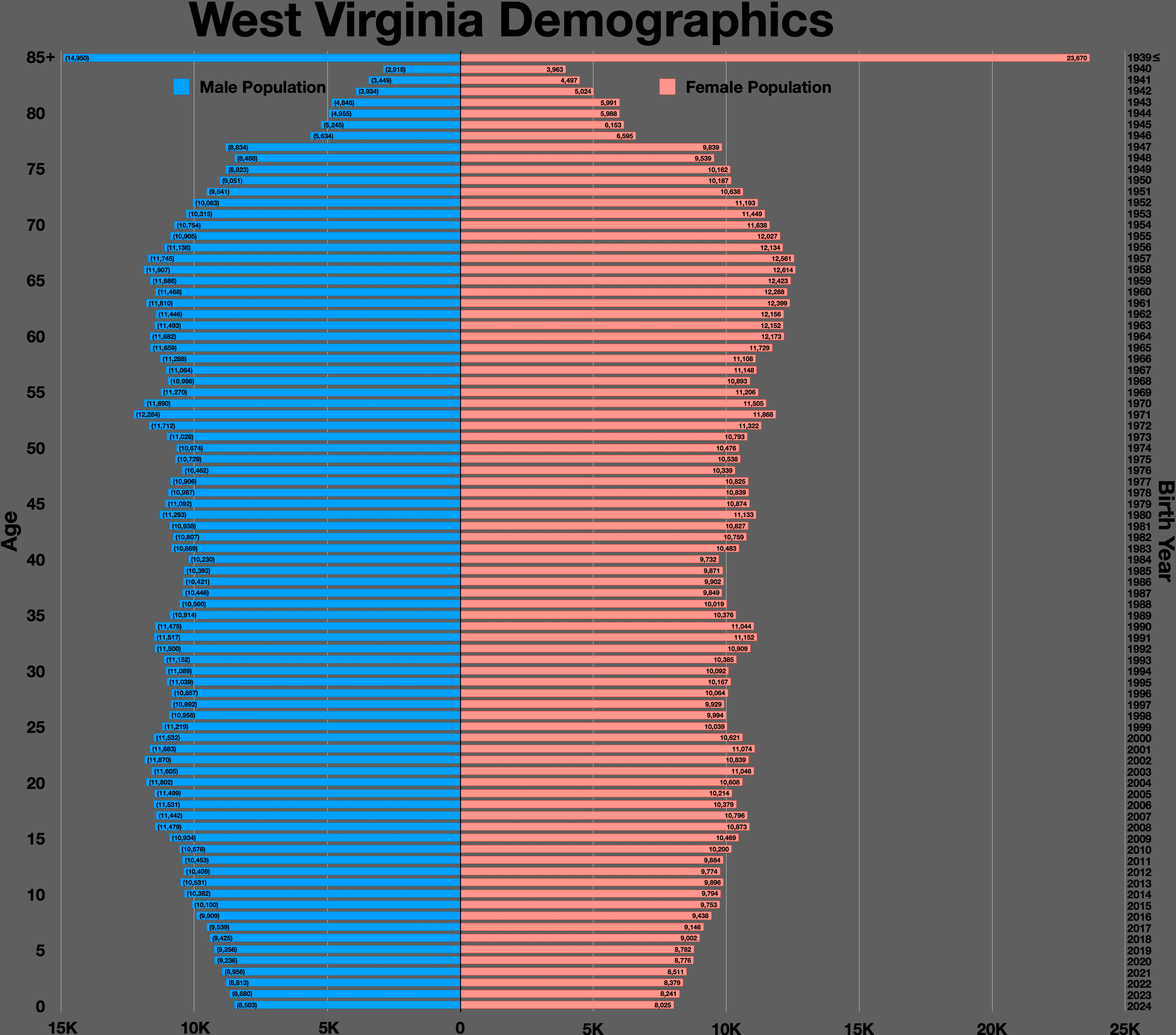
West Virginia population pyramid

As of the 2020 United States census, West Virginia's population was 1,793,716, a 3.2% decrease from the 2010 United States census. West Virginia's center of population is in Gassaway.

According to HUD's 2022 Annual Homeless Assessment Report, there were an estimated 1,375 homeless people in West Virginia.

Ethnic composition as of the 2020 census
| Race and ethnicity | Alone | Total |
|---|---|---|
| White (non-Hispanic) | 89.1% | 93.0% |
| African American (non-Hispanic) | 3.6% | 4.9% |
| Hispanic or Latino (Note: Persons of Hispanic or Latino origin are not distinguished between total and partial ancestry.) | — | 1.9% |
| Asian | 0.8% | 1.2% |
| Native American | 0.2% | 2.0% |
| Pacific Islander | 0.02% | 0.1% |
| Other | 0.3% | 1.0% |

West Virginia Racial Breakdown of Population
| Racial composition | 1990 | 2000 | 2010 | 2020 |
|---|---|---|---|---|
| White | 96.2% | 95.0% | 93.9% | 89.8% |
| Black | 3.1% | 3.2% | 3.4% | 3.7% |
| Asian | 0.4% | 0.5% | 0.7% | 0.8% |
| Native | 0.1% | 0.2% | 0.2% | 0.2% |
| Native Hawaiian and other Pacific Islander | – | – | – | - |
| Other race | 0.1% | 0.2% | 0.3% | 0.7% |
| Two or more races | – | 0.9% | 1.5% | 4.7% |

West Virginia – Racial and ethnic composition Note: the US Census treats Hispanic/Latino as an ethnic category. This table excludes Latinos from the racial categories and assigns them to a separate category. Hispanics/Latinos may be of any race.
| Race / Ethnicity (NH = Non-Hispanic) | Pop 2000 | Pop 2010 | Pop 2020 | % 2000 | % 2010 | % 2020 |
|---|---|---|---|---|---|---|
| White alone (NH) | 1,709,966 | 1,726,256 | 1,598,834 | 94.56% | 93.16% | 89.14% |
| Black or African American alone (NH) | 56,825 | 62,122 | 64,749 | 3.14% | 3.35% | 3.61% |
| Native American or Alaska Native alone (NH) | 3,456 | 3,493 | 3,187 | 0.19% | 0.19% | 0.18% |
| Asian alone (NH) | 9,356 | 12,285 | 14,903 | 0.52% | 0.66% | 0.83% |
| Pacific Islander alone (NH) | 335 | 387 | 429 | 0.02% | 0.02% | 0.02% |
| Other race alone (NH) | 1,144 | 1,192 | 4,652 | 0.06% | 0.06% | 0.26% |
| Mixed race or Multiracial (NH) | 14,983 | 24,991 | 72,135 | 0.83% | 1.35% | 4.02% |
| Hispanic or Latino (any race) | 12,279 | 22,268 | 34,827 | 0.68% | 1.20% | 1.94% |
| Total | 1,808,344 | 1,852,994 | 1,793,716 | 100.00% | 100.00% | 100.00% |

As of 2019, West Virginia has an estimated population of 1,792,147, which is a decrease of 10,025 (0.55%) from the prior year and a decrease of 47,162 (2.55%) since the previous census. This includes a natural decrease of 3,296 (108,292 births minus 111,588 deaths) and an increase from net migration of 14,209 into the state. West Virginia is the least populous southeastern state. Immigration from outside the United States resulted in a net increase of 3,691, and migration within the country produced a net increase of 10,518.

In 2018, the top countries of origin for West Virginia's immigrants were Mexico, China, India, the Philippines and Germany. Only 1.6% of the state's residents were foreign-born, placing West Virginia last among the 50 states in that statistic. It also has the lowest percentage of residents who speak a language other than English at home (2.6%).

The five largest ancestry groups in West Virginia according to the American Community Survey are: 22% American, 17% English, 13% German, 10% Irish, and 4% Italian.

Large numbers of people of German ancestry are present in the northeastern counties of the state. People of English ancestry are present throughout the entire state. Many West Virginians who self-identify as Irish are actually Scots-Irish Protestants. African Americans are concentrated in Metro Valley in the vicinity of Charleston and Huntington. African Americans also live in the New River/Greenbrier Valley. The state also has a significant Serbian population. Most of the Serbs came to West Virginia in the late 19th and early 20th centuries to work in the coal mines. There are also small numbers of Hispanics, Asians, Pacific Islanders, and Native Americans in West Virginia. There is also a Romani community in West Virginia. There are also Melungeons in the state.

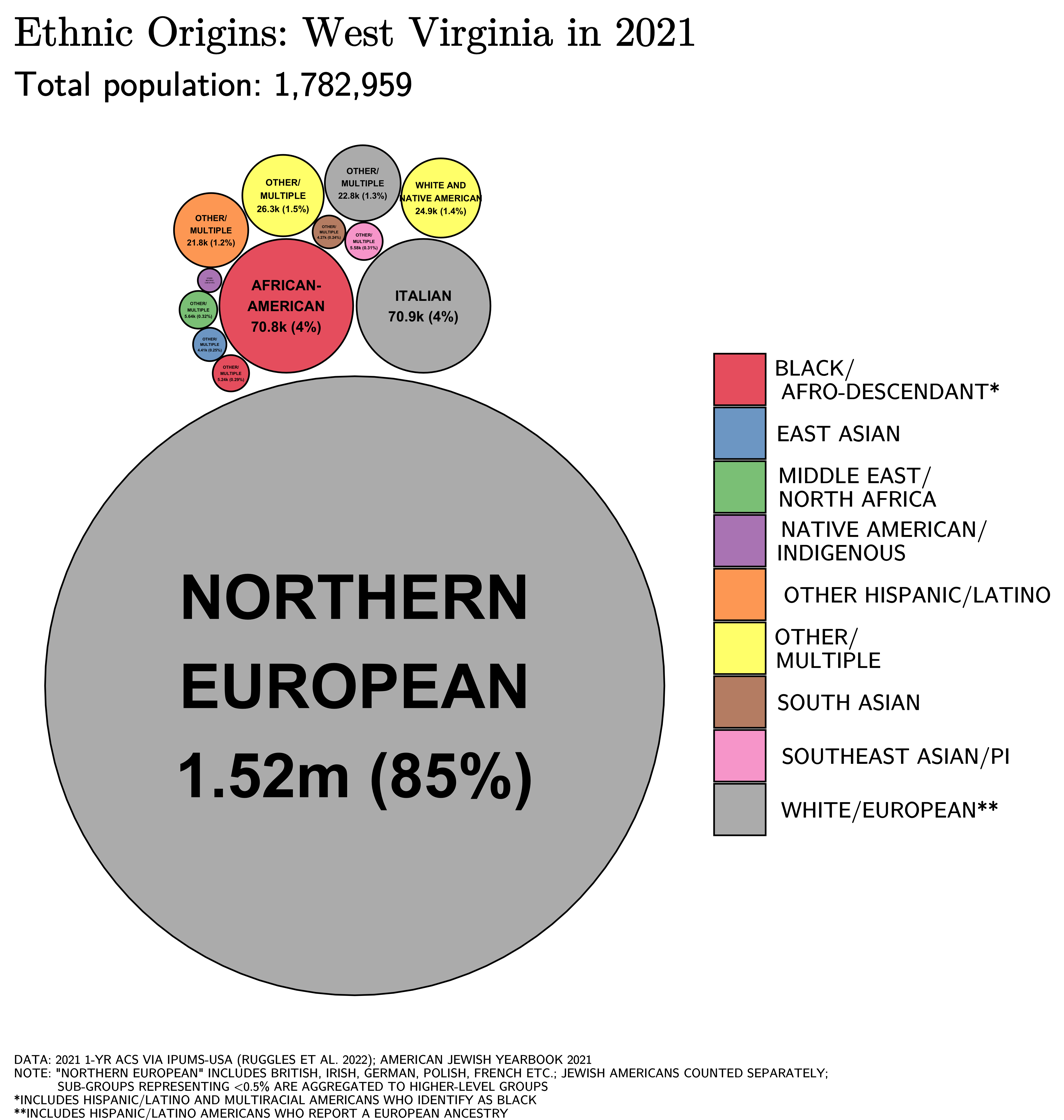
Packed circles diagram showing estimates of the ethnic origins of people in West Virginia in 2021. Largest alone or in any combination ethnic origin by county in West Virginia, per the 2020 census

As of the 2010 census, 16% of West Virginia's residents are 65 or older, ranking second in the country, only behind Florida, which sits at 17%.

Racial plurality in West Virginia by county, per the 2020 U.S. census Legend: Non-Hispanic White 70–80% 80–90% 90%+

There were 20,928 births in 2006. Of these, 19,757 (94.40% of the births, 95.19% of the population) were to non-Hispanic whites. There were 22 births to Native American (0.11% of the births and 0.54% of the population), 177 births to Asians (0.85% of the births and 0.68% of the population), 219 births to Hispanics (1.05% of the births and 0.88% of the population) and 753 births to blacks and others (3.60% of the births and 3.56% of the population). The county with the highest percentage of residents under 18 is Berkeley County with 23.5% and Gilmer County with the lowest percentage at 15.3%.

Birth data

Births in table do not add up, because Hispanics are counted both by their ethnicity and by their race, giving a higher overall number. Since 2016, data for births of White Hispanic origin are not collected, but included in one Hispanic group; persons of Hispanic origin may be of any race.

Live Births by Race/Ethnicity of Mother
| Race | 2014 | 2015 | 2016 | 2017 | 2018 | 2019 | 2020 | 2021 | 2022 | 2023 | 2024 |
|---|---|---|---|---|---|---|---|---|---|---|---|
| White | 18,860 (92.9%) | 18,442 (93.1%) | 17,460 (91.5%) | 16,943 (90.7%) | 16,621 (91.1%) | 16,476 (90.8%) | 15,698 (90.6%) | 15,643 (91.0%) | 15,300 (90.4%) | 14,852 (89.4%) | 15,212 (89.4%) |
| Black | 813 (4.0%) | 738 (3.7%) | 587 (3.1%) | 629 (3.4%) | 626 (3.4%) | 620 (3.4%) | 603 (3.5%) | 543 (3.1%) | 566 (3.3%) | 573 (3.4%) | 586 (3.4%) |
| Asian | 214 (1.0%) | 225 (1.1%) | 170 (0.9%) | 201 (1.1%) | 176 (1.0%) | 173 (1.0%) | 160 (0.9%) | 181 (1.0%) | 178 (1.1%) | 178 (1.1%) | 175 (1.0%) |
| Hispanic (any race) | 350 (1.7%) | 331 (1.7%) | 378 (2.0%) | 390 (2.1%) | 378 (2.1%) | 383 (2.1%) | 373 (2.1%) | 345 (2.0%) | 412 (2.4%) | 506 (3.0%) | 577 (3.4%) |
| Total | 20,301 (100%) | 19,805 (100%) | 19,079 (100%) | 18,675 (100%) | 18,248 (100%) | 18,136 (100%) | 17,323 (100%) | 17,198 (100%) | 16,929 (100%) | 16,606 (100%) | 17,022 (100%) |

=== Native American tribes ===
Paleo-Indians were the first to settle in West Virginia during 10,500 B.C. Various other tribes settled in the region until the 17th century when the entire area was devoid of Native American population.

=== Languages ===
Top 10 non-English languages spoken in West Virginia
| Language | Percentage of population (as of 2010) |
|---|---|
| Spanish | 1.07% |
| French | 0.17% |
| German | 0.14% |
| Italian | 0.09% |
| Chinese | 0.09% |
| Tagalog | 0.06% |
| Japanese | 0.05% |
| Vietnamese | 0.04% |
| Urdu | 0.04% |
| Korean | 0.04% |

In 2010 97.67% (1,697,042) of West Virginia residents aged 5 years or older spoke English as their primary language. 2.33% of residents spoke a native language other than English.

=== Religion ===
Religious self-identification, per Public Religion Research Institute's 2022 American Values Survey
1. Protestantism (53.0%)
2. Catholicism (11.0%)
3. Jehovah's Witness (2.00%)
4. Mormonism (1.00%)
5. Unaffiliated (28.0%)
6. New Age (3.00%)
7. Buddhism (2.00%)

Religion in West Virginia (2020)
| religion | percent |
| Protestant | 70% |
| Unaffiliated | 18% |
| Catholic | 6% |
| Mormon | 2% |
| Jewish | 1% |
| Muslim | 1% |
| Other faith | 1% |
| Unanswered | 1% |

Several surveys of West Virginians' religious affiliation have been made in recent years, including in 2008 by the American Religion Identity Survey, and in 2010 by the Pew Forum on Religion and Public Life. The Pew survey results admit to a 6.5% margin of error, while the ARIS survey says "estimates are subject to larger sampling errors in states with small populations." A characteristic of religion in Appalachian communities is the abundance of independent, non-affiliated churches, which "remain unnoted and uncounted in any census of church life in the United States". This sometimes leads to the belief that these communities are "unchurched".

The largest denomination as of 2010, according to Association of Religion Data Archives, was the United Methodist Church with 136,000 members in 1,200 congregations. The second-largest Protestant church was the American Baptist Churches USA, with 88,000 members and 381 congregations. The Southern Baptist church had 44,000 members and 232 congregations. The Churches of Christ had 22,000 members and 287 congregations. The Presbyterian Church (USA) had 200 congregations and 20,000 members. By the 2020 ARDA study, non-denominational Protestantism became the largest Christian group, with 152,518 adherents.

A 2015 survey by the Pew Research Center found that West Virginia was the seventh-most "highly religious" state in the nation. A 2020 survey by the Public Religion Research Institute found that 69% of the adult population was Christian, reflecting a slight decrease since the Pew Research Center's 2015 survey. In 2020, a survey of nearly 1,900 West Virginians reported that 78.6% were Christian and 16.2% were unaffiliated. In 2022, the Public Religion Research Institute estimated 67% of the state was Christian (53% Protestant, 11% Catholic, 2% Jehovah's Witness, and 1% Mormon), 28% unaffiliated, 3% New Age, and 2% Buddhist.

=== Vital statistics ===
| Year | Population | Live births | Deaths | Natural change | Crude birth rate (per 1,000) | Crude death rate (per 1,000) | Natural change (per 1,000) | Crude migration change (per 1,000) |
|---|---|---|---|---|---|---|---|---|
| 2000 | 1,807,021 | 20,865 | 21,114 | -249 | 11.5 | 11.7 | -0.2 | |
| 2001 | 1,801,481 | 20,428 | 20,967 | -539 | 11.3 | 11.6 | -0.3 | -2.8 |
| 2002 | 1,805,414 | 20,712 | 21,016 | -304 | 11.5 | 11.6 | -0.1 | 2.3 |
| 2003 | 1,812,295 | 20,935 | 21,306 | -371 | 11.6 | 11.8 | -0.2 | 4.0 |
| 2004 | 1,816,438 | 20,880 | 20,793 | 87 | 11.5 | 11.4 | 0.1 | 2.2 |
| 2005 | 1,820,492 | 20,836 | 20,780 | 56 | 11.4 | 11.4 | 0.0 | 2.2 |
| 2006 | 1,827,912 | 20,931 | 20,672 | 259 | 11.5 | 11.3 | 0.2 | 3.9 |
| 2007 | 1,834,052 | 21,994 | 21,086 | 908 | 12.0 | 11.5 | 0.5 | 2.9 |
| 2008 | 1,840,310 | 21,501 | 21,557 | -56 | 11.7 | 11.7 | 0.0 | 3.4 |
| 2009 | 1,847,775 | 21,268 | 21,386 | -118 | 11.5 | 11.6 | -0.1 | 4.1 |
| 2010 | 1,854,404 | 20,470 | 21,275 | -805 | 11.0 | 11.5 | -0.5 | 4.0 |
| 2011 | 1,857,305 | 20,717 | 21,867 | -1,150 | 11.2 | 11.8 | -0.6 | 2.2 |
| 2012 | 1,858,706 | 20,827 | 21,915 | -1,088 | 11.2 | 11.8 | -0.6 | 1.3 |
| 2013 | 1,856,588 | 20,825 | 21,843 | -1,018 | 11.2 | 11.8 | -0.6 | -0.6 |
| 2014 | 1,852,948 | 20,301 | 22,186 | -1,885 | 11.0 | 12.0 | -1.0 | -0.9 |
| 2015 | 1,846,270 | 19,805 | 22,752 | -2,947 | 10.7 | 12.3 | -1.6 | -2.0 |
| 2016 | 1,835,935 | 19,079 | 22,732 | -3,653 | 10.4 | 12.4 | -2.0 | -3.6 |
| 2017 | 1,822,742 | 18,675 | 23,276 | -4,601 | 10.2 | 12.8 | -2.6 | -4.7 |
| 2018 | 1,810,572 | 18,248 | 23,478 | -5,230 | 10.1 | 13.0 | -2.9 | -3.8 |
| 2019 | 1,800,441 | 18,136 | 23,404 | -5,268 | 10.1 | 13.0 | -2.9 | -2.7 |
| 2020 | 1,791,670 | 17,323 | 26,106 | -8,783 | 9.7 | 14.6 | -4.9 | 0.0 |
| 2021 | 1,785,921 | 17,198 | 29,503 | -12,305 | 9.6 | 16.5 | -6.9 | 3.7 |
| 2022 | 1,774,003 | 16,929 | 27,507 | -10,578 | 9.5 | 15.5 | -6.0 | -0.8 |
| 2023 | 1,770,036 | 16,606 | 24,693 | -8,087 | 9.4 | 14.0 | -4.6 | 2.3 |
| 2024 | 1,767,402 | 17,022 | 24,268 | -7,246 | 9.6 | 13.7 | -4.1 | 2.6 |
| 2025 | 1,766,147 | 16,931 | 24,734 | -7,803 | 9.6 | 14.0 | -4.4 | 3.7 |

== Economy ==
According to the U.S. Bureau of Economic Analysis, in 2025, West Virginia's gross domestic product was $109.276 billion and its per capita personal income was $57,932. As of May 2025, the state's unemployment rate was 3.8%.

While per capita income fell 2.6% nationally in 2009, West Virginia's grew at 1.8%. Through the first half of 2010, exports from West Virginia topped $3 billion, growing 39.5% over the same period from the previous year and ahead of the national average by 15.7%.

Forbes ranked Morgantown as the 10th-best small city in the nation to conduct business in 2010. The city is also home to West Virginia University, the 95th-best public university, according to U.S. News & World Report in 2011. The proportion of West Virginia's adult population with a bachelor's degree is the lowest in the U.S., at 17.3%.

The net corporate income tax rate is 6.5% while business costs are 13% below the national average.

The U.S. Bureau of Economic Analysis reported that in 2014 West Virginia's economy grew twice as fast as the next fastest-growing state east of the Mississippi River, ranking third alongside Wyoming and just behind North Dakota and Texas among the fastest-growing states. In 2025, 98.8% of businesses in West Virginia were small businesses, employing 47.4% of the state's workforce.

=== Tourism ===
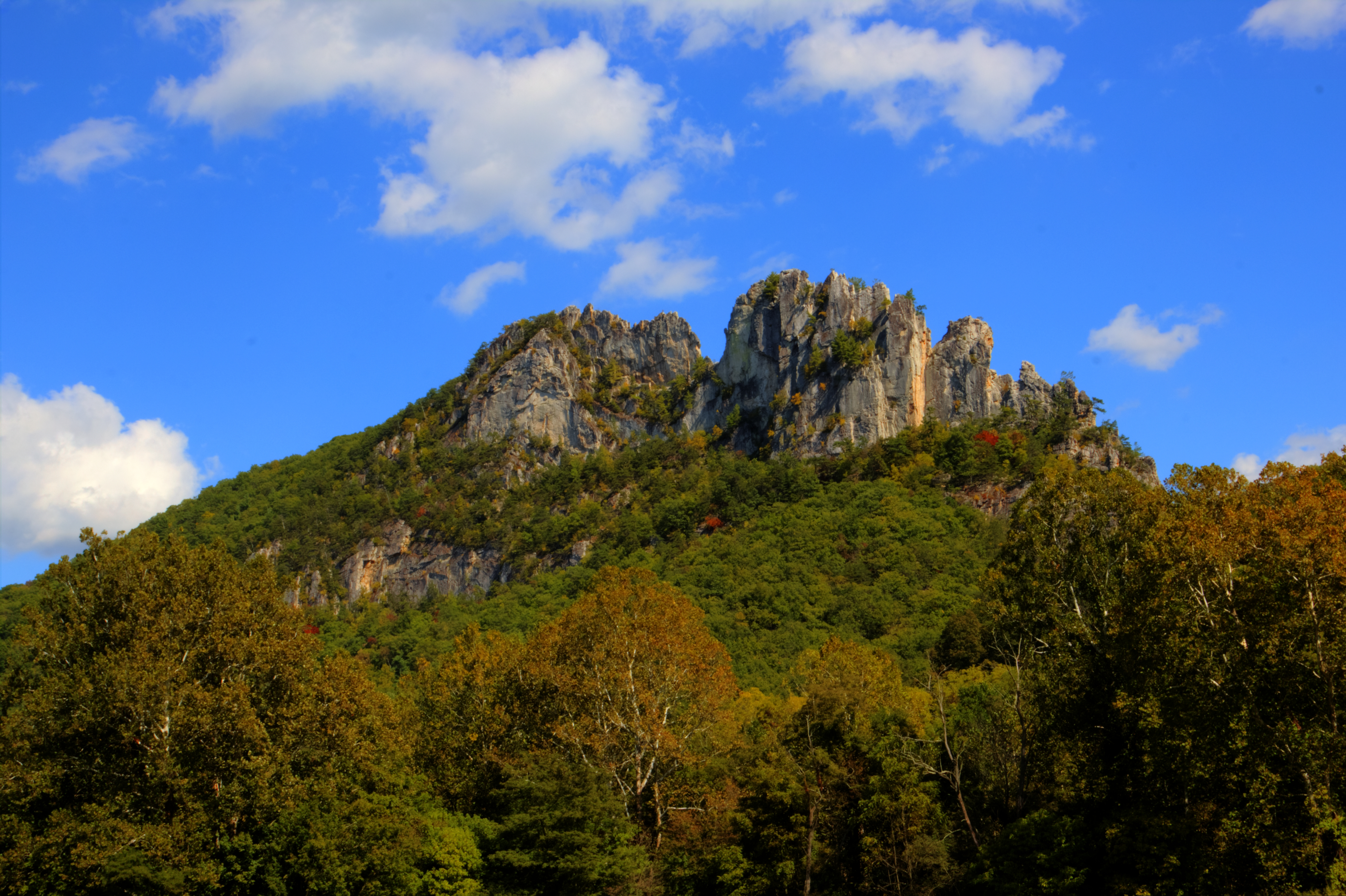
Seneca Rocks, Pendleton County

Tourism contributed $4.27 billion to the state's economy and employed 44,400 people in 2010, making it one of the state's largest industries. Many tourists, especially in the eastern mountains, are drawn to the region's notable opportunities for outdoor recreation. Canaan Valley is popular for winter sports, Seneca Rocks is one of the premier rock climbing destinations in the eastern U.S., the New River Gorge/Fayetteville area draws rock climbers as well as whitewater rafting enthusiasts, and the Monongahela National Forest is popular with hikers, backpackers, hunters, and anglers.

Also drawing tourism to the state is the West Virginia State Park & State Forest system, which comprises 45 units covering 164,000 acres. In 2021, over 9 million people visited a West Virginia State Park, the highest number on record. This is partly due to a recent $151 million improvement project that has seen improvements at every park and forest.

In addition to such outdoor recreation opportunities, the state offers a number of historic and cultural attractions. Harpers Ferry National Historical Park is a historic town situated at the confluence of the Shenandoah and Potomac rivers. Harpers Ferry was the site of John Brown's 1859 raid on the U.S. Armory and Arsenal. Located at the approximate midpoint of the Appalachian Trail, Harpers Ferry is the base of the Appalachian Trail Conservancy.

The Greenbrier hotel and resort, originally built in 1778, has long been considered a premier hotel, frequented by numerous world leaders and U.S. presidents over the years.

West Virginia is the site of the National Radio Astronomy Observatory, which features the Green Bank Telescope. For the 1963 Centennial of the State, it hosted two high school graduate delegates from each of the 50 States at the National Youth Science Camp near Bartow, and has continued this tradition ever since. The main building of Weston State Hospital is the largest hand-cut sandstone building in the western hemisphere, second worldwide only to the Kremlin in Moscow. Tours of the building, which is a National Historic Landmark and part of the National Civil War Trail, are offered seasonally and by appointment year-round. West Virginia has numerous popular festivals throughout the year.

=== Energy ===
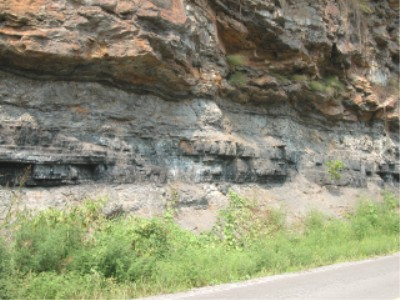
Bituminous coal seam in southwestern West Virginia

One of the major resources in West Virginia's economy is coal. According to the Energy Information Administration, West Virginia is a top coal producer in the United States, second only to Wyoming. West Virginia is located in the heart of the Marcellus Shale Natural Gas Bed, which stretches from Tennessee north to New York in the middle of Appalachia.

As of 2017, the coal industry accounted for 2% of state employment. Nearly all the electricity generated in West Virginia is from coal-fired power plants. West Virginia produces a surplus of electricity and leads the nation in net interstate electricity exports. Farming is also practiced in West Virginia, but on a limited basis because of the mountainous terrain over much of the state.

An assessment from 2012 estimated that West Virginia had the potential to generate 8,627 GWh/year from 2,772 MW of 100-meter wind turbines, and 60,000 GWh from 40,000 MW of photovoltaics, including 3,810 MW of rooftop photovoltaics. This was based on then-existing technologies and apparently was based on some assumed requirements for the economic performance of the respective resources.

West Virginia Wind Generation (GWh, Million kWh)
| Year | Capacity (MW) | Total | Jan | Feb | Mar | Apr | May | Jun | Jul | Aug | Sept | Oct | Nov | Dec |
|---|---|---|---|---|---|---|---|---|---|---|---|---|---|---|
| 2009 | 330 | 742 | 86 | 86 | 69 | 71 | 31 | 49 | 49 | 32 | 46 | 71 | 68 | 86 |
| 2010 | 431 | 939 | 92 | 79 | 85 | 86 | 66 | 69 | 49 | 33 | 66 | 114 | 89 | 112 |
| 2011 | 564 | 1099 | 102 | 113 | 112 | 114 | 49 | 62 | 45 | 68 | 60 | 122 | 124 | 132 |
| 2012 | 583 | 1286 | 201 | 147 | 136 | 130 | 59 | 90 | 85 | 41 | 65 | 98 | 100 | 133 |
| 2013 | 583 | 1387 | 175 | 154 | 174 | 140 | 134 | 78 | 55 | 58 | 52 | 58 | 159 | 152 |
| 2014 | 583 | 1451 | 166 | 146 | 167 | 143 | 100 | 62 | 76 | 64 | 67 | 154 | 157 | 149 |
| 2015 | 583 | 1376 | 158 | 137 | 181 | 137 | 75 | 103 | 65 | 44 | 71 | 122 | 147 | 136 |
| 2016 | 686 | 1432 | 166 | 164 | 134 | 120 | 74 | 92 | 69 | 57 | 67 | 130 | 135 | 222 |
| 2017 | 686 | 1682 | 124 | 123 | 171 | 174 | 152 | 140 | 112 | 52 | 70 | 116 | 167 | 211 |
| 2018 | 686 | 1779 | 191 | 181 | 183 | 180 | 138 | 132 | 97 | 108 | 106 | 144 | 160 | 160 |
| 2019 | | | 160 | 131 | 144 | 185 | 152 | 162 | | | | | | |

=== Taxes ===
West Virginia personal income tax is based on federal adjusted gross income (not taxable income), as modified by specific items in West Virginia law. Citizens are taxed within five income brackets, which range from 3.0% to 6.5%. The state's consumer sales tax is levied at 6% on most products except for non-prepared foods.

West Virginia counties administer and collect property taxes, although property tax rates reflect levies for state government, county governments, county boards of education and municipalities. Counties may also impose a hotel occupancy tax on lodging places not located within the city limits of any municipality that levies such a tax. Municipalities may levy license and gross receipts taxes on businesses located within the city limits and a hotel occupancy tax on lodging places in the city. Although the Department of Tax and Revenue plays a major role in the administration of this tax, less than half of one percent of the property tax collected goes to state government.

The primary beneficiaries of the property tax are county boards of education. Property taxes are paid to the sheriff of each of the state's 55 counties. Each county and municipality can impose its own rates of property taxation within the limits set by the West Virginia Constitution. The West Virginia legislature sets the rate of tax of county boards of education. This rate is used by all county boards of education statewide. However, the total tax rate for county boards of education may differ from county to county because of excess levies. The Department of Tax and Revenue supervises and otherwise assists counties and municipalities in their work of assessment and tax rate determination. The total tax rate is a combination of the tax levies from four state taxing authorities: state, county, schools and municipal. This total tax rate varies for each of the four classes of property, which consists of personal, real and intangible properties. Property is assessed according to its use, location and value as of July 1. WV Assessments has a free searchable database of West Virginia real estate tax assessments, covering current and past years. All property is reappraised every three years; annual adjustments are made to assessments for property with a change of value. West Virginia does not impose an inheritance tax. Because of the phase-out of the federal estate tax credit, West Virginia's estate tax is not imposed on estates of persons who died on or after January 1, 2005.

=== Largest private employers ===
The largest private employers in West Virginia, as of March 2019, were:
| Rank | Company |
|---|---|
| 1 | WVU Medicine |
| 2 | Walmart |
| 3 | CAMC Health System |
| 4 | Mountain Health Network |
| 5 | Kroger |
| 6 | Lowe's Home Centers |
| 7 | Contura Energy |
| 8 | Wheeling Hospital, Inc. |
| 9 | Mylan Pharmaceuticals |
| 10 | Murray American Energy |
| 11 | ResCare |
| 12 | Mon Health |
| 13 | Macy's Corporate Services |
| 14 | American Electric Power |
| 15 | West Virginia's Choice, Inc. |
| 16 | FirstEnergy Corp |
| 17 | Dolgencorp, LLC (Dollar General Stores) |
| 18 | Thomas Health Systems |
| 19 | Pilgrim's Pride Corporation of West Virginia |
| 20 | Frontier West Virginia |
| 21 | Blackhawk Mining, LLC |
| 22 | Darden Restaurants (GMRI, Inc.) (Note: Labelled as "General Mills Restaurants", one of Darden's predecessors. GMRI, Inc. remains Darden's main operating subsidiary.) |
| 23 | Arch Coal, Inc. |
| 24 | Walgreens |
| 25 | DowDuPont, Inc. |

== Quality of life ==
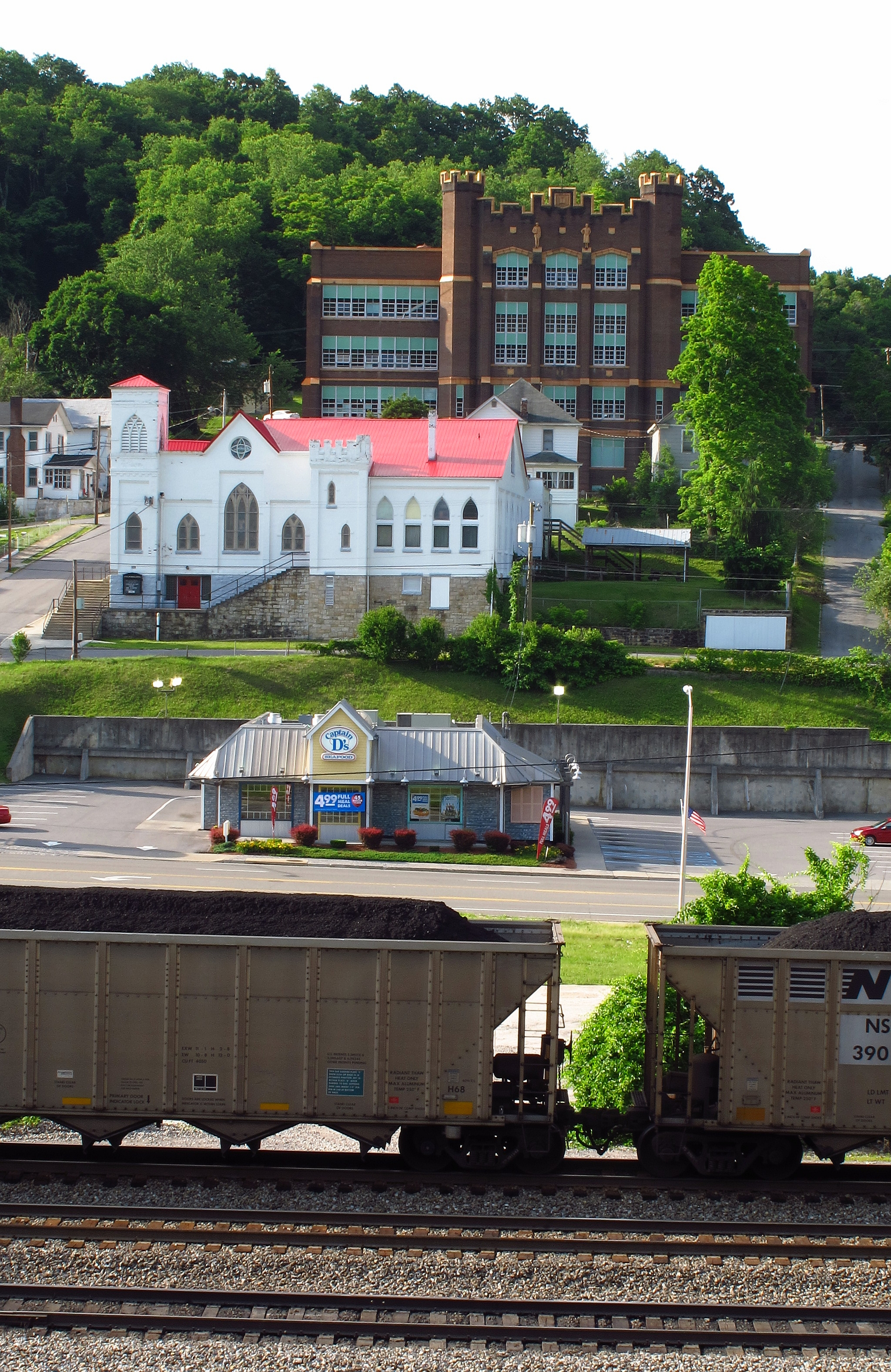
Bluefield, a major center for coal mining, in 2014

Percent of Americans living below the poverty line in each U.S. state, and the District of Columbia. West Virginia has one of the highest poverty rates.

=== Economy ===
West Virginia coal exports declined 40% in 2013—a loss of $2.9 billion and overall total exports declined 26%. West Virginia ranked last in the Gallup Economic Index for the fourth year running. West Virginia's score was −44, or a full 17 points lower than the average of −27 for the other states in the bottom ten. West Virginia ranked 48th in the CNBC "Top States for Business 2013" based on measures of competitiveness such as economy, workforce and cost of living—ranking among the bottom five states for the last six years running. West Virginia ranked 49th in the 2014 State New Economy Index and has ranked in the bottom three states since 1999. West Virginia ranked last or next-to-last in critical indicators such as Workforce Education, Entrepreneurial Activity, High-Tech Jobs, and Scientists and Engineers.

=== Employment ===
In 2012, West Virginia's gross domestic product (GDP) grew by 3.3%. The state issued a report highlighting the state's GDP as indicating a fast-growing economy, but did not address employment indicators. In 2009–2013, the U.S. real GDP increased 9.6% and total employment increased 3.9%. In West Virginia during the same time period, its real GDP increased about 11%, while total employment decreased by 1,000 jobs from 746,000 to 745,000.

In 2013, West Virginia ranked last in the nation with an employment-to-population ratio of only 50%, compared to the national average of 59%. The state lost 5,600 jobs in its labor force in four critical economic sectors: construction (1,900), manufacturing (1,100), retail (1,800), and education (800), while gaining just 400 in mining and logging. The state's Civilian Labor Force dropped by 15,100.

=== Wages and poverty ===
Personal income growth in West Virginia during 2013 was only 1.5%—the lowest in the nation—and about half the national average (2.6%). Overall income growth in West Virginia in the last thirty years has been only 13%—about a third of the national average (37%). Wages of the impoverished bottom 1% income earners decreased by 3%, compared to the national average, which increased 19%.

West Virginia's poverty rate is one of the highest in the nation. 2017 estimates indicate that 19% of the state's population lives in poverty, exceeding the national average of 13%.

=== Population ===
United Van Lines 37th Annual Migration Study showed in 2013 that 60% more people moved out of West Virginia than moved in. West Virginia's population is expected to decline by more than 19,000 residents by 2030, and West Virginia lost one of its three seats in the United States House of Representatives in the 2020 census. West Virginia is the only state where death rates exceed birth rates. During 2010–2013, about 21,000 babies per year were born in West Virginia, but over these three years West Virginia had 3,000 more deaths than births.

=== Family ===
Gallup-Healthways annual "State of American Well-Being" rankings reports that 1,261 concerned West Virginians rated themselves as "suffering" in categories such as Quality of Life, Physical Health, and Access to Basic Needs. Overall, West Virginia citizens rated themselves as being more miserable than people in all other states—for five years running. In addition, the Gallup Well-Being Index for 2013 ranked Charleston, the state capital, and Huntington last and next-to-last out of 189 U.S. Metropolitan Statistical Areas.

The Annie E. Casey Foundation's National Index of Children's Progress ranked West Virginia 43rd in the nation for all kids, and last for white kids. The Annie E. Casey Foundation's 2013 KIDS COUNT Data Book also ranked West Virginia's education system 47th in the nation for the second straight year.

=== Health ===
Overdose death rates in the United States

United Health Foundation's "America's Health Rankings" for 2013 found that Americans are making considerable progress in key health measures. West Virginia, however, ranked either last or second-to-last in twenty categories, including cancer, child immunization, diabetes, disabilities, drug deaths, teeth loss, low birth weight, missed work days due to health, prescription drug overdose, preventable hospitalizations, and senior clinical care. Wisconsin Population Health Institute annual "Health Rankings" for 2012 showed West Virginia spends $9,671 per capita on health care annually. El Salvador spends just $467, yet both have the same life expectancy. In 2012, according to the Census Bureau, West Virginia was the only state where death rates exceed birth rates. During 2010–2013, about 21,000 babies per year were born in West Virginia, but there were 24,000 deaths. In demographics, this is called a "net mortality society".

The National Center for Health Statistics says national birth rates for teenagers are at historic lows—during 2007–2010, teen birth rates fell 17% nationally. West Virginia, however, ranked last with a 3% increase in birth rates for teenagers. A study by West Virginia's Marshall University showed that 19% of babies born in the state have evidence of drug or alcohol exposure. This is several times the national rate, where studies show that about 5.9% of pregnant women in the U.S. use illicit drugs, and about 8.5% consume any alcohol. An Institute for Health Policy Research study determined that mortality rates in Appalachia are correlated with coal production. In twenty West Virginia coal counties mining more than a million tons of coal per year and having a total population of 850,000, there are about 10,100 deaths per year, with 1,400 of those statistically attributed to deaths from heart, respiratory and kidney disease from living in an Appalachian coal county.

In 2015, McDowell County had the highest rate of drug-induced deaths of any county in the United States, with a rate of 141 deaths per 100,000 people. Four of the five counties with the highest rates of drug-induced deaths are in West Virginia (McDowell, Wyoming, Cabell and Raleigh Counties). In 2022, West Virginia had the highest drug overdose death rate of any US state, at 80.9 per 100,000 people.

American environmental attorney Robert Bilott exposed how DuPont had been knowingly polluting water with perfluorooctanoic acid (PFOA) in Parkersburg, West Virginia, since the 1980s. This battle with DuPont is depicted in the film Dark Waters.

==== Life expectancy ====
The residents of West Virginia have a lower life expectancy than the national average. In 2014 life expectancy for both sexes in the state was 76.0 years compared to 79.1 years for the United States as a whole. In 2014, males in West Virginia lived an average of 73.6 years compared to a national average of 76.7 years and females lived an average of 77.5 years compared to a national average of 81.5 years. Male life expectancy in West Virginia between 1980 and 2014 increased by 4.7 years, compared to a national average of a 6.7-year increase. Life expectancy for females in West Virginia between 1980 and 2014 increased by 1.7 years, compared to a national average of a 4.0-year increase. Life expectancy for both sexes is among the lowest of all states.

Life expectancies in 2014 for both sexes in West Virginia counties ranged from a low of 70.3 years in McDowell County to a high of 79.3 years in Pendleton County. McDowell and several other West Virginia counties are among the counties in the U.S. with the lowest life expectancies.

== Government and politics ==
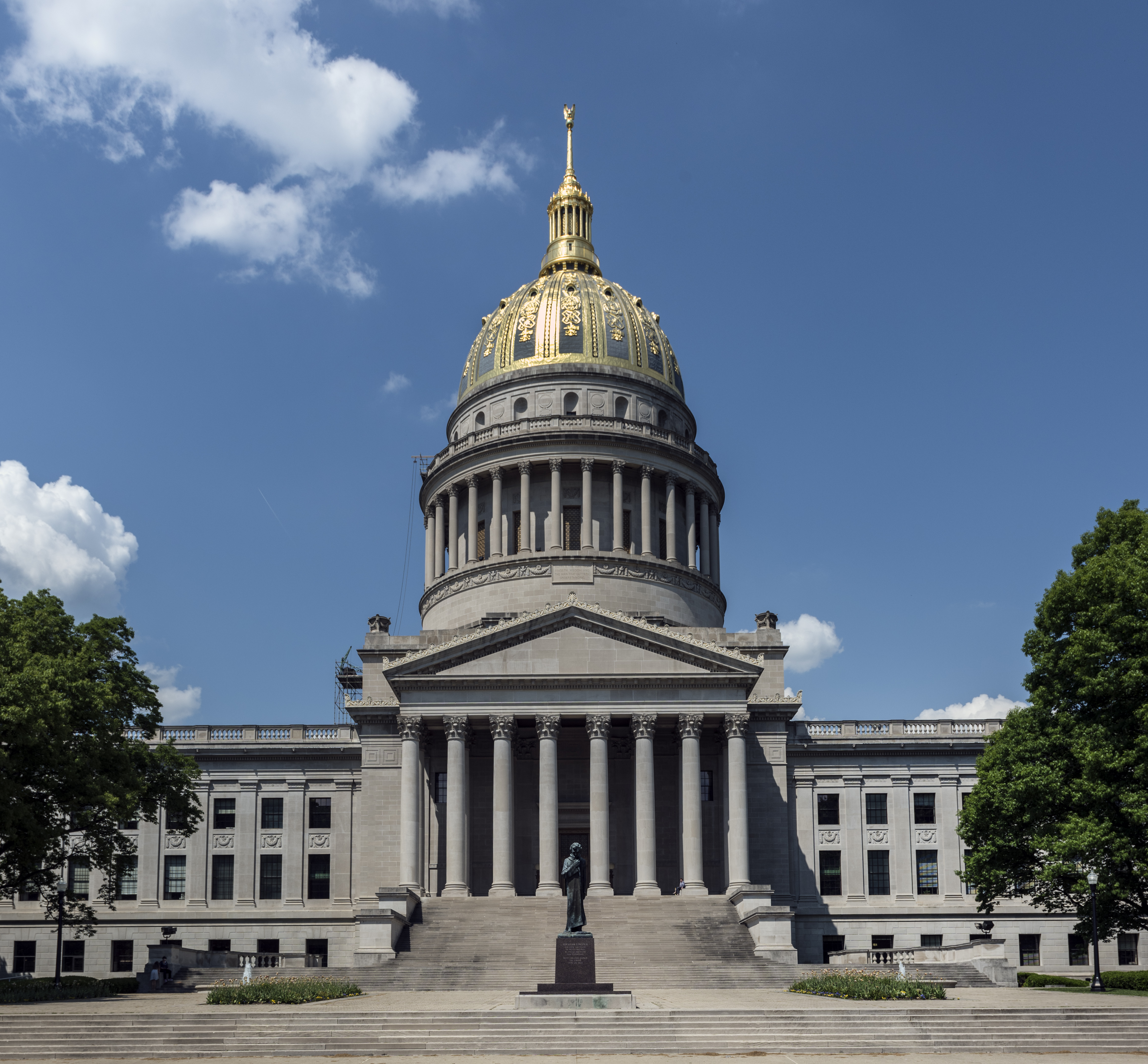
The West Virginia State Capitol in Charleston is home to the West Virginia Legislature.

The West Virginia Legislature is bicameral. It consists of the House of Delegates and the Senate, both housed in the West Virginia State Capitol. It is a citizen's legislature, meaning that legislative office is not a full-time occupation, but rather a part-time position. Consequently, the legislators often hold full-time jobs in their community of residence.

Typically, the legislature is in session for 60 days between January and early April. The final day of the regular session ends in a bewildering fury of last-minute legislation to meet a constitutionally imposed midnight deadline. During the remainder of the year, monthly interim sessions are held in preparation for the regular session. Legislators also gather periodically for 'special' sessions when called by the governor.

The governor, elected every four years on the same day as the U.S. presidential election, is sworn in during the following January. Governors of West Virginia can serve two consecutive terms but must sit out a term before serving a third term in office. The title of Lieutenant Governor is assigned by statute to the senate president. West Virginia's current governor is Patrick Morrisey.

West Virginia's highest court is the Supreme Court of Appeals. The Supreme Court of Appeals of West Virginia is the busiest appellate court of its type in the United States. West Virginia is one of 11 states with a single appellate court. The state constitution allows for the creation of an intermediate court of appeals, but the Legislature has never created one. The Supreme Court is made up of five justices, elected in nonpartisan elections to 12-year terms. For the purpose of courts of general jurisdiction, the state is divided into 31 judicial circuits. Each circuit is made up of one or more counties. Circuit judges are elected in non-partisan elections to serve eight-year terms.

West Virginia is an alcoholic beverage control state, but unlike most such states, it does not operate retail outlets, having exited that business in 1990. It retains a monopoly on wholesaling of distilled spirits only. West Virginia is one of 27 states that do not have a death penalty, and it was the only state in the southeastern United States to have abolished it until 2021, when Virginia did so as well.

=== Politics ===
Voter registration as of August 31, 2025:
| Party | Total voters | Percentage |
|---|---|---|
| Republican | 502,332 | 42.24% |
| Democratic | 334,054 | 28.09% |
| Unaffiliated | 300,320 | 25.25% |
| Minor parties | 52,567 | 4.42% |
| Total | 1,189,273 | 100.00% |

West Virginia is regarded as a heavily Republican, "deep red" state at the federal level. Since 2000, West Virginians have supported the Republican candidate in every presidential election, nearly always by increasing margins.

The 2008 presidential election was the last to date in which the Democratic nominee won any of the state's counties. In every election since 2008, West Virginia has voted Republican and Virginia has voted Democratic.

In the 2024 presidential election, Republican Donald Trump won all of the state's counties and 69.97% of the vote, the highest percentage any party has won in the state's history. Meanwhile, Virginia voted for a Democratic nominee who lost the popular vote, with the two states differing by 48 percentage points in margin. West Virginia was Trump's best performance in 2016.

At the state level, West Virginia's politics were largely dominated by the Democratic Party from the Great Depression through the 2000s. This was a legacy of West Virginia's very strong tradition of union membership. After the 2014 midterm elections Democrats controlled the governorship, the majority of statewide offices, and one U.S. Senate seat, while Republicans held one U.S. Senate seat, all three of the state's U.S. House seats, and a majority in both houses of the West Virginia Legislature. In the 2016 elections, the Republicans held on to their seats and made gains in the State Senate and gained three statewide offices.

Evangelical Christians comprised 52% of the state's voters in 2008. A poll in 2005 showed that 53% of West Virginia voters are anti-abortion, the seventh highest in the country. A 2014 poll by Pew Research found that 35% of West Virginians supported legal abortion in "all or most cases" while 58% wanted it to be banned "in all or most cases".

A September 2011 Public Policy Polling survey found that 19% of West Virginia voters thought same-sex marriage should be legal, while 71% thought it should be illegal and 10% were not sure. A separate question on the same survey found that 43% of West Virginia voters supported the legal recognition of same-sex couples, with 17% supporting same-sex marriage, 26% supporting civil unions but not marriage, 54% favoring no legal recognition and 3% not sure. In 2008, 58% favored troop withdrawal from Iraq while just 32% wanted troops to remain. On fiscal policy in 2008, 52% said raising taxes on the wealthier individuals would benefit the economy, while 45% disagreed.

In a 2020 study, West Virginia was ranked as the 16th hardest state for citizens to vote in.

== Transportation ==
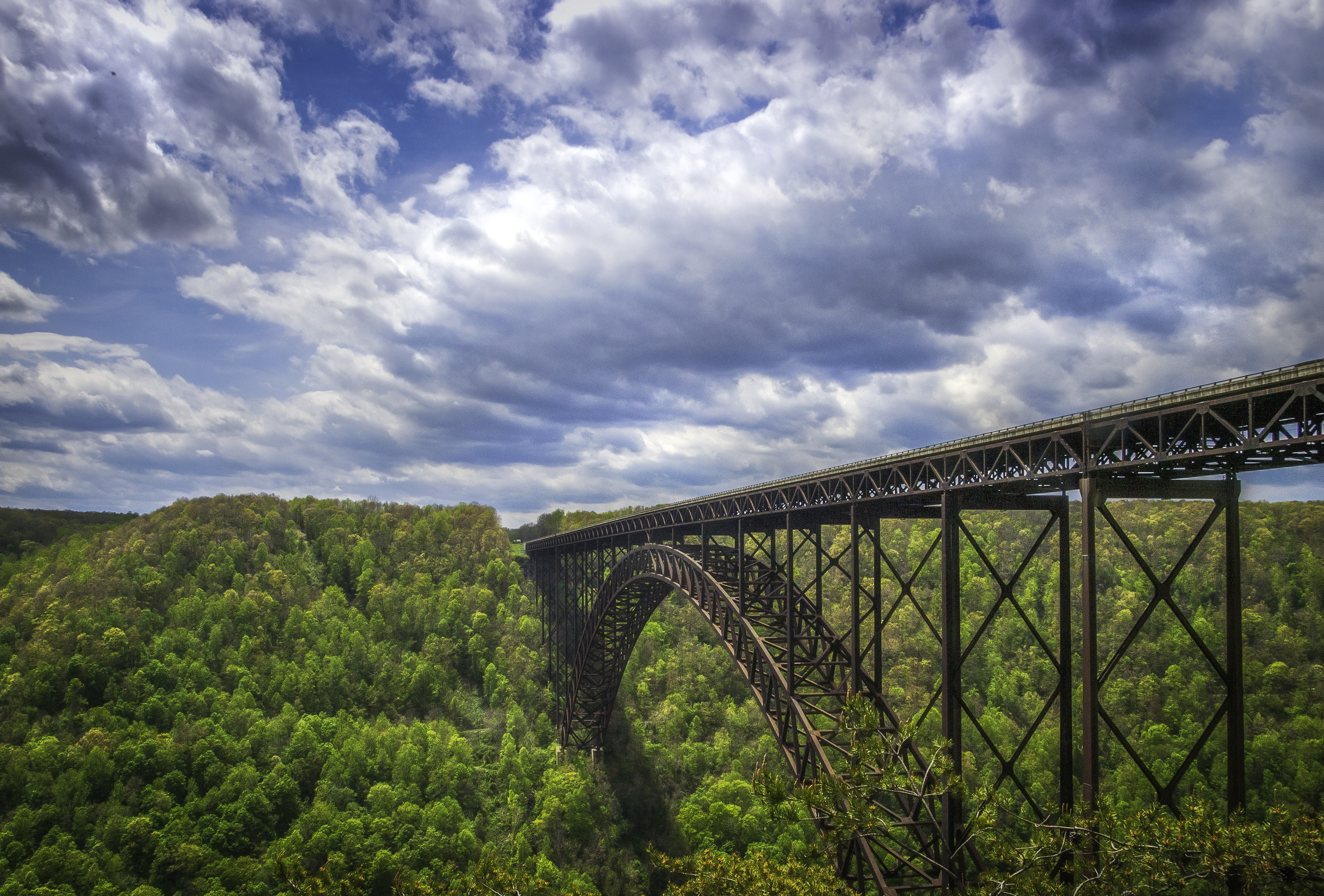
The iconic New River Gorge Bridge near Fayetteville

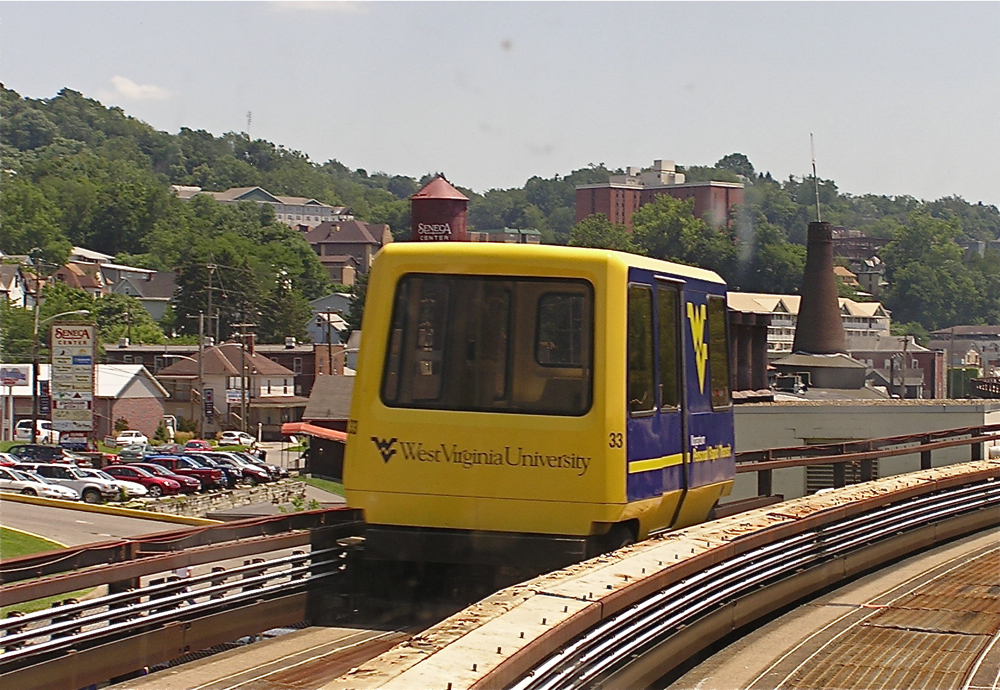
Morgantown Personal Rapid Transit

Highways form the backbone of transportation systems in West Virginia, with over 37,300 miles (60,000 km) of public roads in the state. Airports, railroads, and rivers complete the commercial transportation modes for West Virginia. Commercial air travel is facilitated by airports in Charleston, Huntington, Morgantown, Beckley, Lewisburg, Clarksburg, and Parkersburg. All but Charleston and Huntington are subsidized by the federal Department of Transportation's Essential Air Service program. The cities of Charleston, Huntington, Beckley, Wheeling, Morgantown, Clarksburg, Parkersburg and Fairmont have bus-based public transit systems.

West Virginia University in Morgantown boasts the PRT (personal rapid transit) system, the state's only single-rail public transit system. Developed by Boeing, the WVU School of Engineering and the Department of Transportation, it was a model for low-capacity light transport designed for smaller cities. Recreational transportation opportunities abound in West Virginia, including hiking trails, rail trails, ATV off-road trails, white water rafting rivers, and two tourist railroads, the Cass Scenic Railroad and the Potomac Eagle Scenic Railroad.

Rail lines in the state used to be more prevalent, but many lines have been discontinued because of increased automobile traffic. Many old tracks have been converted to rail trails for recreational use, although the coal-producing areas still have railroads running at near capacity. Amtrak's Cardinal roughly parallels I-64's path through the state. MARC trains serve commuters to Washington, D.C. in the eastern panhandle. In 2006 Norfolk Southern along with the West Virginia and U.S. Government approved a plan to modify many of the rail tunnels in West Virginia, especially in the southern half of the state, to allow for double-stacked cars (see inter-modal freight). This is expected to also help bring economic growth to the southern half of the state. An Intermodal Freight Facility is located at Prichard, just south of Huntington.

Because of the mountainous nature of the entire state, West Virginia has several notable tunnels and bridges. The most famous of these is the New River Gorge Bridge, which was at a time the longest steel single-arch bridge in the world with a 3,031-foot (924 m) span. The bridge is also pictured on the West Virginia State quarter. The Fort Steuben Bridge (Weirton-Steubenville Bridge) was at the time of its construction one of only three cable-stayed steel girder trusses in the United States. "The Veterans Memorial Bridge was designed to handle traffic from the Fort Steuben Bridge as well as its own traffic load", to quote the Weirton Daily Times newspaper. The 80-year-old Fort Steuben Bridge (Weirton-Steubenville Bridge) was permanently closed on January 8, 2009. The Wheeling Suspension Bridge was the first bridge built across the Ohio River in 1849 and for a time was the longest suspension bridge in the world. It is still the oldest vehicular suspension bridge in the United States still in use.

=== Roads ===
The Veterans Memorial Bridge carries US 22 from Weirton into Ohio.

West Virginia is crossed by seven Interstate Highways. I-64 enters the state near White Sulphur Springs in the mountainous east, and exits for Kentucky in the west, near Huntington. I-77 enters from Virginia in the south, near Bluefield. It runs north past Parkersburg before it crosses into Ohio. I-64 and I-77 between Charleston and Beckley are merged as a toll road known as the West Virginia Turnpike, which continues as I-77 alone from Beckley to Princeton. It was constructed beginning in 1952 as a two-lane road, but rebuilt beginning in 1974 to Interstate standards. Today almost nothing of the original construction remains. I-68's western terminus is in Morgantown. From there it runs east into Maryland. At the I-68 terminus in Morgantown, it meets I-79, which enters from Pennsylvania and runs through the state to its southern terminus in Charleston. I-70 briefly runs through West Virginia, crossing the northern panhandle through Wheeling, while I-470 is a bypass of Wheeling (making Wheeling among the smallest cities with an interstate bypass). I-81 also briefly runs in West Virginia through the eastern panhandle where it goes through Martinsburg.

The interstates are supplemented by roads constructed under the Appalachian Corridor system. Four Corridors are complete. Corridor D, carrying US 50, runs from the Ohio River, and I-77, at Parkersburg to I-79 at Clarksburg. Corridor G, carrying US 119, runs from Charleston to the Kentucky border at Williamson. Corridor L, carrying US 19, runs from the Turnpike at Beckley to I-79 near Sutton (and provides a shortcut of about 40 miles (64 km) and bypasses Charleston's urban traffic for travelers heading to and from Florida). Corridor Q, carrying US 460, runs through Mercer County, entering the state from Giles County, Virginia and then reentering Virginia at Tazewell County.

Work continues on the long-delayed Corridor H, which will carry US 48 from Weston to the Virginia line near Wardensville. As of 2018, a section from Weston to Kerens just past Elkins, and another section from Wardensville to Davis are complete. Other projects under development are a four-lane upgrade of WV 10 from Logan to Man and then of WV 80 from Man to Gilbert, which is about half completed; and four-lane upgrades to US 52 from Bluefield to Williamson, known as the "King Coal Highway" and from Williamson to Huntington, known as the "Tolsia Highway" which are many years from completion. A project known as the "Coalfields Expressway" is also ongoing, and will carry US 121 from Beckley west across Raleigh, Wyoming, and McDowell counties, entering Virginia near Bishop.

== Education ==
West Virginia is one of the lowest-scoring U.S. states for education, and has one of the lowest levels of educational attainment of any state. As of 2022, just 10% of adults over the age of 25 had a postgraduate degree and 24% had a bachelor's degree, compared to 17% and 35% nationally. In Virginia it was 18% and 42%, respectively.

According to The National Assessment of Educational Progress, it is significantly below the national average in mathematics, reading, writing, and science. The surrounding states of Virginia, Maryland, Kentucky, Ohio, and Pennsylvania score higher than or equal to the national average.

=== Colleges and universities ===
- American Public University System
- Appalachian Bible College
- Bethany College
- Bluefield State University
- Blue Ridge Community and Technical College
- BridgeValley Community and Technical College
- Concord University
- Davis and Elkins College
- Eastern West Virginia Community and Technical College
- Fairmont State University
- Future Generations Graduate School
- Glenville State University
- Marshall University
- Mountwest Community and Technical College
- New River Community and Technical College
- Pierpont Community and Technical College
- Potomac State College of West Virginia University
- Salem International University
- Shepherd University
- Southern West Virginia Community and Technical College
- University of Charleston
- West Liberty University
- West Virginia Northern Community College
- West Virginia School of Osteopathic Medicine
- West Virginia State University
- West Virginia University
- West Virginia University at Parkersburg
- West Virginia University Institute of Technology
- West Virginia Wesleyan College
- Wheeling University

== Culture ==
=== West "by God" Virginia ===
West Virginia is often called "West 'by God' Virginia." The term first appeared in online-accessible publications in 1926, when students at the University of Virginia wrote an article in the Virginia Spectator claiming that West "by God" Virginia women could consume corn liquor on its own, without having to mix it with other liquids. A 1939 academic article by Harold Wentworth of the WVU History department had a footnote claiming that the term originated from when a native West Virginian, annoyed at being called a Virginian, claimed that he instead hailed from "West 'by God' Virginia."

=== Sports ===
West Virginia is home to college sports teams from two schools—West Virginia and Marshall—that play in NCAA Division I. West Virginia is also home to several professional minor league baseball, football, hockey, and other sports teams.

| Club | Sport | League |
|---|---|---|
| West Virginia Mountaineers | Football / Basketball | Big 12 Conference |
| Marshall Thundering Herd | Football / Basketball | Sun Belt Conference |
| Bluefield Ridge Runners | Baseball | Appalachian League |
| Charleston Dirty Birds | Baseball | Atlantic League of Professional Baseball |
| Tri-State Coal Cats | Baseball | Appalachian League |
| West Virginia Miners | Baseball | Prospect League |
| West Virginia Black Bears | Baseball | MLB Draft League |
| Wheeling Nailers | Ice hockey | ECHL |
| West Virginia Lightning | Football | Elite Mid-Continental Football League |
| West Virginia United | Soccer | USL League Two |
| West Virginia Bruisers | Football | Women's Football Alliance |

=== Music ===
==== Appalachian music ====
West Virginia's folk heritage is a part of the Appalachian folk music tradition, and includes styles of fiddling, ballad singing, and other styles that draws on English folk and Scots-Irish music. Camp Washington-Carver, a Mountain Cultural Arts Center located at Clifftop in Fayette County, hosts an annual Appalachian String Band Festival. The Capitol Complex in Charleston hosts The Vandalia Gathering, where traditional Appalachian musicians compete in contests and play in impromptu jam sessions and evening concerts over the weekend. The Augusta Heritage Center sponsored by Davis & Elkins College in Elkins in Randolph County produces the annual Augusta Heritage Festival, which includes intensive week-long workshops in the summer that help preserve Appalachian heritage and traditions.

==== Classical music ====
The West Virginia Symphony Orchestra was founded in 1939, as the Charleston Civic Orchestra, before becoming the Charleston Symphony Orchestra in 1943. The first conductor was William R. Wiant, followed by the conductor Antonio Modarelli, who was written about in the November 7, 1949 Time Magazine for his composition of the River Saga, a six-section program piece about the Kanawha River according to the Charleston Gazette's November 6, 1999, photo essay, "Snapshots of the 20th Century". Before coming to Charleston, Modarelli had conducted the Wheeling Symphony Orchestra and the Philadelphia Orchestra, according to the orchestra's website.

The Pulitzer Prize-winning 20th-century composer George Crumb was born in Charleston and earned his bachelor's degree there before moving outside the state. There had also been a series of operatic-style concerts performed in Wheeling during mid-century as well.

==== Musical innovation ====
The West Virginia Cultural Center in Charleston is home to the West Virginia Department of Arts, Culture and History, which helps underwrite and coordinate a large number of musical activities. The center is also home to Mountain Stage, an internationally broadcast live-performance music radio program established in 1983 which is carried by many affiliates of National Public Radio. The program also travels to other venues in the state such as the West Virginia University Creative Arts Center in Morgantown.

The center hosts concerts sponsored by the Friends of Old Time Music and Dance, which brings an assortment of acoustic roots music to West Virginians. The center also hosts the West Virginia Dance Festival, which features classical and modern dance.

Every year, Camp Washington Carver in Clifftop, Fayette County, WV, hosts a five-day mountaintop gathering of traditional string band musicians with contests, concerts, workshops, square dances, camping and vendors. The event attracts 3,000 fans of old time Appalachian music, a precursor to bluegrass.

Huntington's historic Keith-Albee Theatre, built by brothers A.B. and S.J. Hyman, was originally opened to the public on May 7, 1928, and hosts a variety of performing arts and music attractions. The theatre was eventually gifted to Marshall University and is currently going through renovation to restore it to its original splendor.

Every summer Elkins hosts the Augusta Heritage Festival, which brings folk musicians from around the world. The town of Glenville has long been home to the annual West Virginia State Folk Festival.

The Mountaineer Opera House in Milton hosts a variety of musical acts.

John Denver's hit song "Take Me Home, Country Roads" describes the experience of driving through West Virginia. The song mentions the Shenandoah River and the Blue Ridge Mountains, both features traversing the easternmost extremity of the state's "eastern panhandle", in Jefferson County. On March 8, 2014, West Virginia Governor Earl Ray Tomblin signed House Concurrent Resolution 40 naming "Take Me Home, Country Roads" the fourth official state song of West Virginia.

Symphony Sunday is an annual event hosted by the West Virginia Symphony Orchestra held in June. It is a day full of music by community groups, food, and family fun, culminating in a free performance by the West Virginia Symphony Orchestra with a fireworks display following. The event began in 1982 and is held on the front lawn of the University of Charleston.

The Daily Mail Kanawha County Majorette and Band Festival is West Virginia's longest-running music festival. It is for the eight public high schools in Kanawha County. The festival began in 1947. It is held at the University of Charleston Stadium at Laidley Field in downtown Charleston.

== See also ==
- Index of West Virginia-related articles
- List of West Virginia archives
- List of West Virginia counties by socioeconomic factors
- Outline of West Virginia
- List of West Virginia State Fishing Records
- List of festivals in West Virginia

| Preceded by Kansas | List of U.S. states by date of statehood Admitted on June 20, 1863 (35th) | Succeeded by Nevada |
