= List of colleges and universities in Wisconsin =

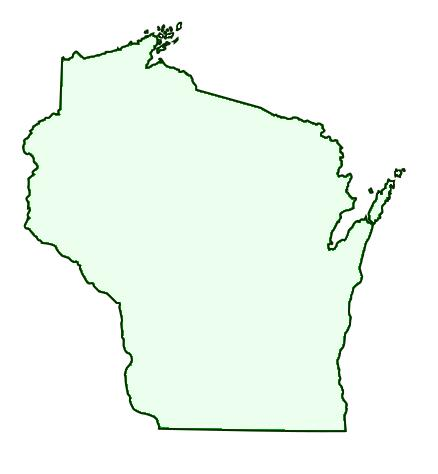

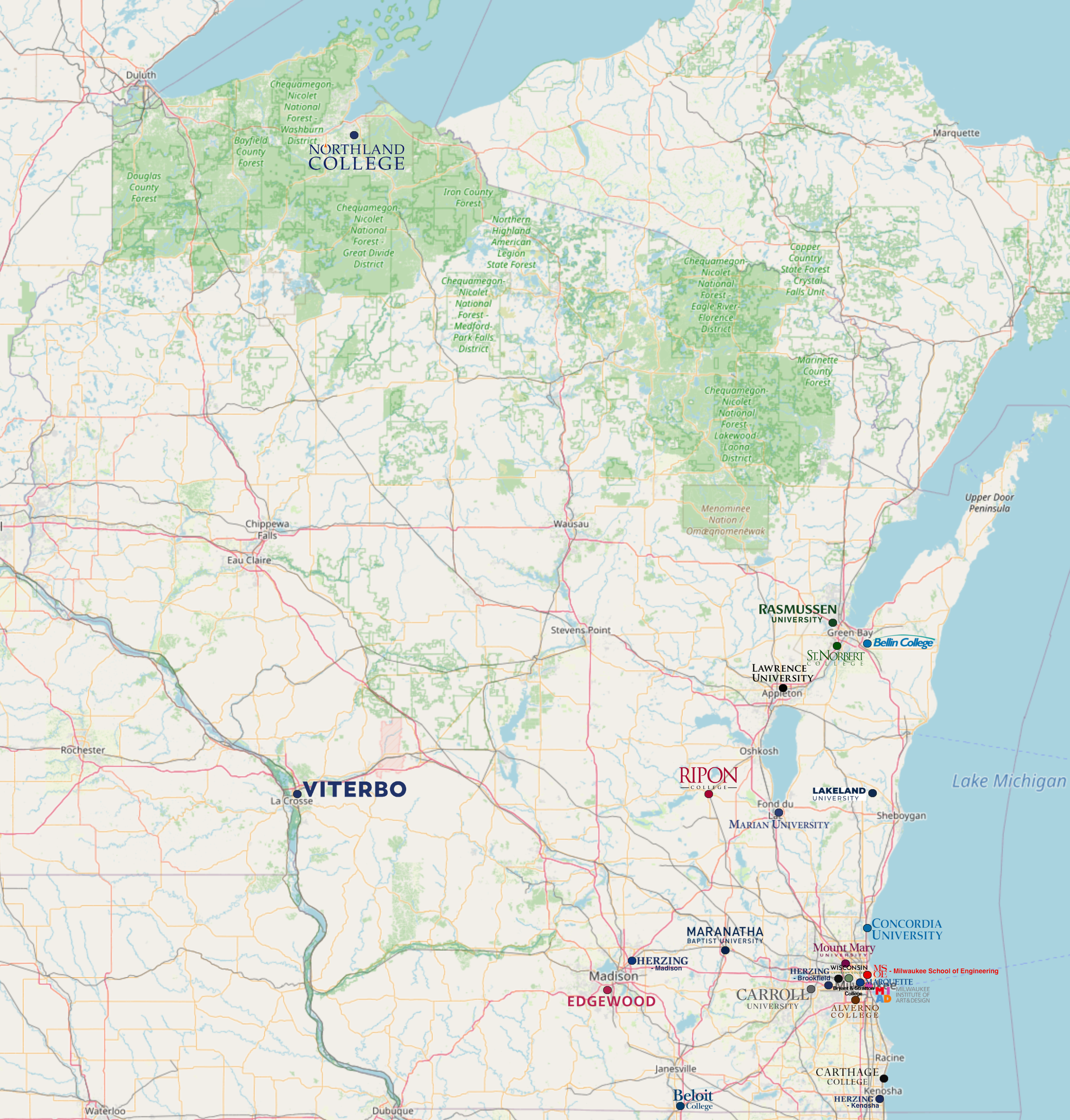
Wisconsin private universities & colleges map

There are sixty-five colleges and universities in the U.S. state of Wisconsin that are listed under the Carnegie Classification of Institutions of Higher Education. The University of Wisconsin–Madison (UW–Madison) is the state's largest public post-secondary institution, with a fall 2026 enrollment of 51,481 students. It is the flagship of the University of Wisconsin System, which includes 12 other campuses.

Marquette University in Milwaukee is the state's largest private university, with a fall 2024 enrollment of 11,746 students. With 13,641 in attendance, Madison Area Technical College is the largest Community college of Wisconsin. Midwest College of Oriental Medicine-Racine, is the state's smallest institution, with an enrollment of 37 for fall 2024. Waukesha-based Carroll University is the state's oldest four-year post-secondary institution as it was founded on January 31, 1846, two years before Wisconsin achieved statehood. Beloit College, located in the city of Beloit, was established two days later on February 2.

Medical College of Wisconsin and University of Wisconsin School of Medicine and Public Health are the state's only two medical schools. The state's two law schools, Marquette University Law School and University of Wisconsin Law School, are both accredited by the American Bar Association. The majority of Wisconsin's post-secondary institutions are accredited by the Higher Learning Commission, but 15 have received accreditation from the Accrediting Council for Independent Colleges and Schools (ACICS). Most are accredited by multiple agencies, such as the National League for Nursing (NLNAC), the Commission on Collegiate Nursing Education (CCNE), the American Dental Association (ADA), the American Physical Therapy Association (APTA), and the National Council for Accreditation of Teacher Education (NCATE).

== Extant institutions ==
=== Research universities ===
| Institution | Location(s) (Note: Location is based on the Carnegie Classification of Institutions of Higher Education.) | Control (Note: Control is based on the Carnegie Classification of Institutions of Higher Education.) | Type (Note: Types are based on the Carnegie Classification of Institutions of Higher Education.) | Undergraduate enrollment (fall 2024) | Graduate enrollment (fall 2024) | Founded | Accreditation |
|---|---|---|---|---|---|---|---|
| University of Wisconsin–Madison | Madison | Public | Doctoral Universities: Very High Research Activity (R1) | 38,891 | 12,590 | 1848 | HLC, ACPE, ABA, AND, AOTA, APTA, APA, ASHA, AVMA, CCNE, CEPH, JRCERT, LCME, NASD, NASM |
| University of Wisconsin–Milwaukee | Milwaukee | Public | Doctoral Universities: Very High Research Activity (R1) | 19,059 | 3,850 | 1956 | HLC, AND, AOTA, APTA, APA, ASHA, CCNE, CEA, CEPH, JRCERT, NASAD, NASD, NASM |
| Marquette University | Milwaukee | Private not-for-profit | Doctoral Universities: High Research Activity (R2) | 8,045 | 3,701 | 1881 | HLC, ACEN, ACME, ABA, ADA, AOTA, APTA, APA, ASHA, CCNE, COA |

=== Doctoral/Professional universities ===
| Institution | Location(s) (Note: Location is based on the Carnegie Classification of Institutions of Higher Education.) | Control (Note: Control is based on the Carnegie Classification of Institutions of Higher Education.) | Type (Note: Types are based on the Carnegie Classification of Institutions of Higher Education.) | Undergraduate enrollment (fall 2024) | Graduate enrollment (fall 2024) | Founded | Accreditation |
|---|---|---|---|---|---|---|---|
| Concordia University Wisconsin | Mequon | Private not-for-profit | Doctoral/Professional Universities (D/PU) | 2,401 | 2,852 | 1881 | HLC, ACPE, AOTA, APTA, ASHA, CCNE |
| Edgewood University | Madison | Private not-for-profit | Doctoral/Professional Universities (D/PU) | 1,236 | 1,223 | 1927 | HLC, CCNE |
| University of Wisconsin–Oshkosh | Oshkosh | Public | Doctoral/Professional Universities (D/PU) | 11,620 | 896 | 1871 | HLC, CCNE, COA, NASM |

=== Master's colleges and universities ===
| Institution | Location(s) (Note: Location is based on the Carnegie Classification of Institutions of Higher Education.) | Control (Note: Control is based on the Carnegie Classification of Institutions of Higher Education.) | Type (Note: Types are based on the Carnegie Classification of Institutions of Higher Education.) | Undergraduate enrollment (fall 2024) | Graduate enrollment (fall 2024) | Founded | Accreditation |
|---|---|---|---|---|---|---|---|
| Alverno College | Milwaukee | Private not-for-profit | Master's Colleges & Universities: Larger Programs (M1) | 673 | 644 | 1887 | HLC, CCNE, NASM |
| Carroll University | Waukesha | Private not-for-profit | Master's Colleges & Universities: Larger Programs (M1) | 2,581 | 557 | 1846 | HLC, AOTA, APTA, CCNE, CEPH, CNEA |
| Carthage College | Kenosha | Private not-for-profit | Master's Colleges & Universities: Small Programs (M3) | 2,675 | 169 | 1847 | HLC, CCNE, NASM |
| Herzing University | Brookfield, Kenosha, Madison | Private not-for-profit | Master's Colleges & Universities: Larger Programs (M1) | 3,425 | 2,762 | 1965 | HLC, ABHES, ACEN, CCNE |
| Lakeland University | Plymouth | Private not-for-profit | Master's Colleges & Universities: Larger Programs (M1) | 2,411 | 402 | 1862 | HLC, CCNE |
| Maranatha Baptist University | Watertown | Private not-for-profit | Master's Colleges & Universities: Small Programs (M3) | 735 | 225 | 1968 | HLC, CCNE |
| Marian University | Fond du Lac | Private not-for-profit | Master's Colleges & Universities: Medium Programs (M2) | 1,021 | 225 | 1936 | HLC, CCNE |
| Milwaukee School of Engineering | Milwaukee | Private not-for-profit | Master's Colleges & Universities: Medium Programs (M2) | 2,704 | 249 | 1903 | HLC, CCNE |
| Mount Mary University | Milwaukee | Private not-for-profit | Master's Colleges & Universities: Larger Programs (M1) | 752 | 430 | 1913 | HLC, AND, AOTA, CCNE |
| University of Wisconsin–Eau Claire | Eau Claire | Public | Master's Colleges & Universities: Medium Programs (M2) | 8,332 | 691 | 1916 | HLC, ASHA, CCNE, NASM |
| University of Wisconsin–Green Bay | Green Bay | Public | Master's Colleges & Universities: Medium Programs (M2) | 9,923 | 565 | 1965 | HLC, ACEN, AND, CCNE, NASM |
| University of Wisconsin–La Crosse | La Crosse | Public | Master's Colleges & Universities: Larger Programs (M1) | 9,639 | 945 | 1909 | HLC, AOTA, APTA, CEPH, JRCERT, NASM |
| University of Wisconsin–Parkside | Kenosha | Public | Master's Colleges & Universities: Medium Programs (M2) | 3,310 | 610 | 1968 | HLC |
| University of Wisconsin–Platteville | Platteville | Public | Master's Colleges & Universities: Larger Programs (M1) | 6,029 | 269 | 1866 | HLC, NASAD, NASM |
| University of Wisconsin–River Falls | River Falls | Public | Master's Colleges & Universities: Medium Programs (M2) | 5,030 | 347 | 1875 | HLC, ASHA, MACTE, NASM |
| University of Wisconsin–Stevens Point | Stevens Point | Public | Master's Colleges & Universities: Medium Programs (M2) | 7,763 | 769 | 1894 | HLC, AND, APTA, ASHA, CCNE, NASAD, NASD, NASM, NAST |
| University of Wisconsin–Stout Polytechnic | Menomonie | Public | Master's Colleges & Universities: Larger Programs (M1) | 6,227 | 834 | 1891 | HLC, AND, CEA, NASAD |
| University of Wisconsin–Superior | Superior | Public | Master's Colleges & Universities: Medium Programs (M2) | 1,991 | 886 | 1893 | HLC, NASM |
| University of Wisconsin–Whitewater | Whitewater | Public | Master's Colleges & Universities: Larger Programs (M1) | 9,900 | 1,524 | 1868 | HLC, APA, ASHA, NASAD, NASM |
| Viterbo University | La Crosse | Private not-for-profit | Master's Colleges & Universities: Larger Programs (M1) | 1,299 | 795 | 1890 | HLC, AND, ASHA, CCNE, NASM |

=== Baccalaureate colleges ===
| Institution | Location(s) (Note: Location is based on the Carnegie Classification of Institutions of Higher Education.) | Control (Note: Control is based on the Carnegie Classification of Institutions of Higher Education.) | Type (Note: Types are based on the Carnegie Classification of Institutions of Higher Education.) | Undergraduate enrollment (fall 2024) | Graduate enrollment (fall 2024) | Founded | Accreditation |
|---|---|---|---|---|---|---|---|
| Beloit College | Beloit | Private not-for-profit | Baccalaureate colleges: Arts & Sciences Focus | 1,004 | 0 | 1846 | HLC |
| Lawrence University | Appleton | Private not-for-profit | Baccalaureate colleges: Arts & Sciences Focus | 1,417 | 0 | 1847 | HLC, NASM |
| Ottawa University–Milwaukee | Brookfield | Private not-for-profit | Baccalaureate colleges: Diverse Fields | 41 | 75 | 1865 | HLC |
| Ripon College | Ripon | Private not-for-profit | Baccalaureate colleges: Arts & Sciences Focus | 696 | 13 | 1851 | HLC |
| St. Norbert College | De Pere | Private not-for-profit | Baccalaureate colleges: Arts & Sciences Focus | 1,970 | 62 | 1898 | HLC |
| Wisconsin Lutheran College | Milwaukee | Private not-for-profit | Baccalaureate colleges: Diverse Fields | 957 | 70 | 1973 | HLC, CCNE |

=== Baccalaureate/Associate's colleges ===
| Institution | Location(s) (Note: Location is based on the Carnegie Classification of Institutions of Higher Education.) | Control (Note: Control is based on the Carnegie Classification of Institutions of Higher Education.) | Type (Note: Types are based on the Carnegie Classification of Institutions of Higher Education.) | Enrollment (fall 2024) | Founded | Accreditation |
|---|---|---|---|---|---|---|
| Bryant & Stratton College | Wauwatosa & Racine | Private not-for-profit | Baccalaureate/associate's college | 1,037 | 1854 | MSCHE, ACEN, AOTA, APTA, CCNE |
| Rasmussen University–Green Bay | Wausau | Private for-profit | Baccalaureate/associate's college | 55 | 1900 | HLC, ACEN, CCNE |

=== Associate's colleges ===
| Institution | Location(s) (Note: Location is based on the Carnegie Classification of Institutions of Higher Education.) | Control (Note: Control is based on the Carnegie Classification of Institutions of Higher Education.) | Type (Note: Types are based on the Carnegie Classification of Institutions of Higher Education.) | Enrollment (fall 2024) | Founded | Accreditation |
|---|---|---|---|---|---|---|
| Blackhawk Technical College | Janesville | Public | Associate's Colleges: High Career & Technical-Mixed Traditional/Nontraditional | 2,811 | 1968 | HLC, ADA, APTA, JRCERT |
| Chippewa Valley Technical College | Eau Claire | Public | Associate's Colleges: High Career & Technical-High Nontraditional | 8,330 | 1912 | HLC, ACEN, APTA, JRCERT |
| Fox Valley Technical College | Appleton | Public | Associate's Colleges: High Career & Technical-High Nontraditional | 10,670 | 1967 | HLC, ACEN, ADA, AOTA |
| Gateway Technical College | Kenosha | Public | Associate's Colleges: High Career & Technical-Mixed Traditional/Nontraditional | 10,100 | 1972 | HLC, ACEN, ADA, APTA |
| Lakeshore Technical College | Cleveland | Public | Associate's Colleges: High Career & Technical-High Nontraditional | 3,303 | 1967 | HLC, ABHES, ACEN, ADA, JRCERT |
| Madison Area Technical College | Madison | Public | Associate's Colleges: High Career & Technical-Mixed Traditional/Nontraditional | 13,641 | 1912 | HLC, ACEN, ADA, AND, AOTA, AOA |
| Mid-State Technical College | Wisconsin Rapids, Stevens Point | Public | Associate's Colleges: High Career & Technical-High Nontraditional | 3,144 | 1911 | HLC, ACEN |
| Milwaukee Area Technical College | Milwaukee | Public | Associate's Colleges: High Career & Technical-High Traditional | 13,792 | 1912 | HLC, ACEN, ADA, AOTA, APTA, JRCERT |
| Moraine Park Technical College | Fond du Lac | Public | Associate's Colleges: High Career & Technical-Mixed Traditional/Nontraditional | 4,171 | 1912 | HLC, JRCERT |
| Nicolet Area Technical College | Rhinelander | Public | Associate's Colleges: High Career & Technical-Mixed Traditional/Nontraditional | 1,384 | 1967 | HLC, ACEN, ADA |
| Northcentral Technical College | Wausau | Public | Associate's Colleges: High Career & Technical-High Nontraditional | 6,746 | 1912 | HLC, ACEN, ADA, JRCERT |
| Northeast Wisconsin Technical College | Green Bay | Public | Associate's Colleges: High Career & Technical-Mixed Traditional/Nontraditional | 11,826 | 1912 | HLC, ACEN, ADA, APTA, JRCERT |
| Northwood Technical College | Shell Lake | Public | Associate's Colleges: High Career & Technical-High Nontraditional | 2,940 | 1972 | HLC, ACEN, ADA |
| Southwest Wisconsin Technical College | Fennimore | Public | Associate's Colleges: High Career & Technical-High Nontraditional | 2,849 | 1967 | HLC, ACEN, APTA, MEAC |
| Waukesha County Technical College | Pewaukee | Public | Associate's Colleges: High Career & Technical-High Nontraditional | 8,367 | 1923 | HLC, ACEN, ADA |
| Western Technical College | La Crosse | Public | Associate's Colleges: High Career & Technical-High Traditional | 3,625 | 1912 | HLC, ACEN, ADA, AOTA, APTA, JRCERT |

=== Special-focus institutions ===
| Institution | Location(s) (Note: Location is based on the Carnegie Classification of Institutions of Higher Education.) | Control (Note: Control is based on the Carnegie Classification of Institutions of Higher Education.) | Type (Note: Types are based on the Carnegie Classification of Institutions of Higher Education.) | Undergraduate enrollment (fall 2024) | Graduate enrollment (fall 2024) | Founded | Accreditation |
|---|---|---|---|---|---|---|---|
| Bellin College | Green Bay | Private not-for-profit | Special focus institution: Other Health Professions | 656 | 271 | 1909 | HLC, APTA, CCNE, JRCERT |
| Medical College of Wisconsin | Milwaukee | Private not-for-profit | Special focus institution: Research | 0 | 1,677 | 1893 | HLC, ACPE, ADA, CEPH, LCME |
| Midwest College of Oriental Medicine-Racine | Racine | Private for-profit | Special focus institution: Other Health Professions | 1 | 36 | 1979 | ACAHM |
| Milwaukee Institute of Art & Design | Milwaukee | Private not-for-profit | Special focus institution: Arts, Music & Design | 838 | 0 | 1974 | HLC, NASAD |
| Nashotah House | Nashotah | Private not-for-profit | Special focus institution: Faith-Related | 0 | 143 | 1842 | ATSCA |
| Sacred Heart School of Theology | Franklin | Private not-for-profit | Special focus institution: Faith-Related | 0 | 128 | 1932 | HLC, ATSCA |
| Wisconsin Lutheran Seminary | Mequon | Private Not-for profit | Special-focus institution | 0 | 186 | 1863 | |
| Wisconsin School of Professional Psychology | Milwaukee | Private not-for-profit | Special focus institution: Other Health Professions | 0 | 78 | 1978 | HLC, APA |

=== Tribal colleges ===
| Institution | Location(s) (Note: Location is based on the Carnegie Classification of Institutions of Higher Education.) | Control (Note: Control is based on the Carnegie Classification of Institutions of Higher Education.) | Type (Note: Types are based on the Carnegie Classification of Institutions of Higher Education.) | Enrollment (fall 2024) | Founded | Accreditation |
|---|---|---|---|---|---|---|
| College of Menominee Nation | Keshena | Private not-for-profit | Tribal college | 300 | 1993 | HLC, ACEN |
| Lac Courte Oreilles Ojibwe College | Hayward | Public | Tribal college | 204 | 1982 | HLC, ACEN |

== Defunct institutions ==
| Institution | Location | Control | Founded | Closed | Ref |
|---|---|---|---|---|---|
| Brightwood College | Milwaukee | Private for-profit | 1937 | 2018 | |
| Campion College of the Sacred Heart | Prairie du Chien | Private | 1880 | 1925 | |
| Cardinal Stritch University | Milwaukee | Private | 1937 | 2023 | |
| DeVry University–Wisconsin | Milwaukee | Private for-profit | 1931 | 2015 | |
| Dominican College of Racine | Racine | Private | 1935 | 1974 | |
| Downer College | Fox Lake | Private | 1855 | 1964; Merged into Lawrence University | |
| Gale College | Galesville | Private | 1854 | 1939 | |
| Globe University–Eau Claire | Eau Claire | Private for-profit | 1885 | 2017 | |
| High-Tech Institute–Brookfield | Brookfield | Private for-profit | 2006 | 2014 | |
| Holy Family College | Manitowoc | Private not-for-profit | 1935 | 2020 | |
| Holy Redeemer College | Waterford | Private | 1968 | 1985 | |
| Institute of Paper Chemistry | Appleton | Private | 1929 | 2003; Merged into Georgia Tech | |
| ITT Technical Institute | Green Bay, Greenfield, and Madison | Private for-profit | 1969 | 2016 | |
| Lakeside School of Massage Therapy | Milwaukee | Private | 1985 | 2011; Merged into Herzing University | |
| Madison Business College | Madison | Private | 1858 | 1998 | |
| Madison Media Institute | Madison | Private for-profit | 1969 | 2018 | |
| Milton College | Milton | Private | 1844 | 1982 | |
| Mount Senario College | Ladysmith | Private | 1962 | 2002 | |
| Northland College | Ashland | Private not-for-profit | 1906 | 2025 | |
| Northland International University | Dunbar | Private not-for-profit | 1976 | 2015 | |
| Northwestern College | Watertown | Private | 1865 | 1995; Merged into Martin Luther College | |
| Racine College | Racine | Private | 1852 | 1933 | |
| St. Francis de Sales College | Milwaukee | Private | 1969 | 1982 | |
| Sanford-Brown College | West Allis | Private for-profit | 1866 | 2017 | |
| The School of Architecture at Taliesin | Spring Green | Public | 1932 | 2020 | |
| University of Phoenix–Madison Campus | Madison | Private for-profit | 1976 | 2017 | |
| University of Phoenix–Milwaukee Campus | Brookfield | Private for-profit | 1976 | 2017 | |
| University of Wisconsin Colleges (Note: Universities in this system include: University of Wisconsin–Baraboo/Sauk County; University of Wisconsin–Barron County; University of Wisconsin–Fond du Lac; University of Wisconsin–Fox Valley; University of Wisconsin–Manitowoc; University of Wisconsin–Marathon County; University of Wisconsin–Marinette; University of Wisconsin–Marshfield/Wood County; University of Wisconsin–Richland; University of Wisconsin–Rock County; University of Wisconsin–Sheboygan; University of Wisconsin–Washington County; University of Wisconsin–Waukesha; University of Wisconsin Colleges Online) | Various | Public | 1971 | 2018 | |

== Key ==
Key
| Abbreviation | Accrediting agency |
|---|---|
| AAMFT | American Association for Marriage and Family Therapy |
| ABA | American Bar Association |
| ACEN | Accrediting Commission for Education in Nursing |
| ABHES | Accrediting Bureau of Health Education Schools |
| ACICS | Accrediting Council for Independent Colleges and Schools |
| ACME | Accreditation Commission for Midwifery Education |
| ACPE | Accreditation Council for Pharmacy Education |
| ADA | American Dental Association |
| ADA | American Dietetic Association |
| AND | Academy of Nutrition and Dietetics |
| AOTA | American Occupational Therapy Association |
| APA | American Psychological Association |
| APTA | American Physical Therapy Association |
| ASHA | American Speech–Language–Hearing Association |
| CCNE | Commission on Collegiate Nursing Education |
| CEA | Commission on English Language Program Accreditation |
| CEPH | Council on Education for Public Health |
| CNEA | Commission for Nursing Education Accreditation |
| COA | Council on Accreditation of Nurse Anesthesia Educational Programs |
| HLC | Higher Learning Commission |
| JRCERT | Joint Review Committee on Education Programs in Radiologic Technology |
| LCME | Liaison Committee on Medical Education |
| MACTE | Montessori Accreditation Council for Teacher Education |
| MEAC | Midwifery Education Accreditation Council |
| MSCHE | Middle States Association of Colleges and Schools |
| NASAD | National Association of Schools of Art and Design |
| NASD | National Association of Schools of Dance |
| NASM | National Association of Schools of Music |
| NAST | National Association of Schools of Theatre |
| NCATE | National Council for Accreditation of Teacher Education |
| NLNAC | National League for Nursing |

== See also ==
- Higher education in the United States
- List of college athletic programs in Wisconsin
- List of community colleges in the United States
- List of American institutions of higher education
- Wisconsin Technical College System
