= List of colleges and universities in Iowa =

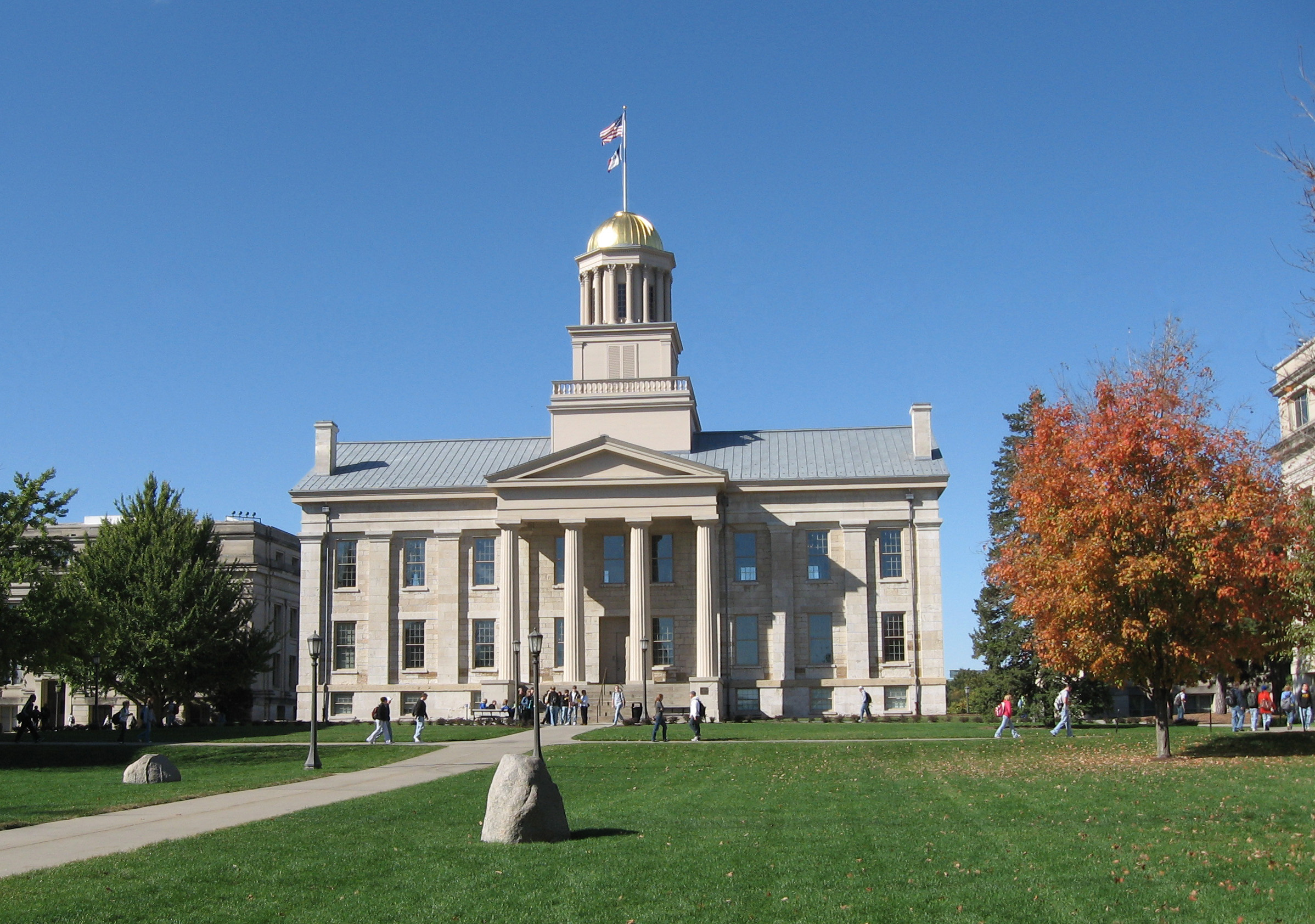
The Old Capitol Building at the University of Iowa, the state's largest university

There are fifty-two colleges and universities in the U.S. state of Iowa that are listed under the Carnegie Classification of Institutions of Higher Education. The Iowa Board of Regents, a governing board, oversees the state's three public universities – the University of Iowa, Iowa State University, and the University of Northern Iowa.

With 4,345 students, Drake University is the state's largest private not-for-profit school. The state's oldest post-secondary institution is Loras College, a private Catholic school in Dubuque that was founded in 1839, seven years before Iowa became a state.

The state's only two law schools, the University of Iowa College of Law and Drake University Law School, are both accredited by the American Bar Association. Roy J. and Lucille A. Carver College of Medicine and Des Moines University are the state's two medical schools. The majority of Iowa's post-secondary institutions are accredited by the Higher Learning Commission (HLC). Most are accredited by multiple agencies, such as the Commission on Collegiate Nursing Education (CCNE), the National Association of Schools of Music (NASM), and the National League for Nursing (NLNAC).

== Extant institutions ==
Institution	Location(s) (Note: School location is based on the Carnegie Classification of Institutions of Higher Education.)	Control (Note: School control is based on the Carnegie Classification of Institutions of Higher Education.)	Type (Note: School types are based on the Carnegie Classification of Institutions of Higher Education.)	Enrollment (fall 2024)	Founded	Accreditation
University of Iowa	Iowa City	Public	Research university	30,779	1847	HLC, ACPE, ABA, ADA, APTA, APA, ASHA, CPE, CAHME, CCNE, CELPA, AANA, CEPH, JRCERT, LCME, NASD, NASM, NAST
Iowa State University	Ames	Public	Research university	30,380	1858	HLC, AAMFT, ADA, APA, AVMA, NASM
University of Northern Iowa	Cedar Falls	Public	Master's university	9,278	1876	HLC, ASHA, NASM
Des Moines Area Community College	Ankeny	Public	Associate's college	23,697	1966	HLC, ABFSE, ADA, NLNAC
Eastern Iowa Community Colleges	Davenport	Public	Associate's college	7,426	1965	HLC
Ellsworth Community College	Iowa Falls	Public	Associate's college	685	1890	HLC
Hawkeye Community College	Waterloo	Public	Associate's college	5,120	1966	HLC, ADA, APTA
Indian Hills Community College	Ottumwa	Public	Associate's college	3,184	1969	HLC, AOTA, APTA, JRCERT
Iowa Central Community College	Fort Dodge	Public	Associate's college	4,949	1966	HLC, ADA, JRCERT, NLNAC
Iowa Lakes Community College	Estherville	Public	Associate's college	1,945	1967	HLC
Iowa Western Community College	Council Bluffs	Public	Associate's college	5,540	1966	HLC, NLNAC, ADA
Kirkwood Community College	Cedar Rapids	Public	Associate's college	12,763	1966	HLC, ADA, AOTA, APTA
Marshalltown Community College	Marshalltown	Public	Associate's college	1,857	1927	HLC, ADA
North Iowa Area Community College	Mason City	Public	Associate's college	2,662	1918	HLC, APTA, NLNAC
Northeast Iowa Community College	Calmar	Public	Associate's college	4,808	1967	HLC
Northwest Iowa Community College	Sheldon	Public	Associate's college	1,907	1966	HLC
Southeastern Community College	West Burlington	Public	Associate's college	3,028	1967	HLC
Southwestern Community College	Creston	Public	Associate's college	1,566	1966	HLC
Western Iowa Tech Community College	Sioux City	Public	Associate's college	5,482	1966	HLC, ADA, APTA, NLNAC
Allen College	Waterloo	Private not-for-profit	Special-focus institution	483	1925	HLC, CCNE, JRCERT, NLNAC
Briar Cliff University	Sioux City	Private not-for-profit	Baccalaureate college	947	1930	HLC, CCNE, NLNAC
Buena Vista University	Storm Lake	Private not-for-profit	Baccalaureate college	1,890	1891	HLC
Central College	Pella	Private not-for-profit	Baccalaureate college	1,084	1853	HLC, NASM
Clarke University	Dubuque	Private not-for-profit	Baccalaureate college	962	1843	HLC, APTA, CCNE, NASM
Coe College	Cedar Rapids	Private not-for-profit	Baccalaureate college	1,195	1851	HLC, CCNE, NASM
Cornell College	Mount Vernon	Private not-for-profit	Baccalaureate college	1,094	1853	HLC
Des Moines University	Des Moines	Private not-for-profit	Special-focus institution	1,534	1898	HLC, AOA, APTA, APMA, CEPH
Divine Word College	Epworth	Private not-for-profit	Special-focus institution	64	1931	HLC
Dordt University	Sioux Center	Private not-for-profit	Baccalaureate college	1,952	1955	HLC, CCNE
Drake University	Des Moines	Private not-for-profit	Master's university	4,345	1881	HLC, ACPE, ABA, NASAD, NASM
Emmaus University	Dubuque	Private not-for-profit	Special-focus institution	234	1941	ABHE, HLC
Faith Baptist Bible College and Theological Seminary	Ankeny	Private not-for-profit	Special-focus institution	611	1921	ABHE, HLC
Graceland University	Lamoni	Private not-for-profit	Master's university	1,102	1895	HLC, TCATE
Grand View University	Des Moines	Private not-for-profit	Master's university	1,856	1896	HLC, CCNE
Grinnell College	Grinnell	Private not-for-profit	Baccalaureate college	1,788	1846	HLC
Loras College	Dubuque	Private not-for-profit	Baccalaureate college	1,189	1839	HLC
Luther College	Decorah	Private not-for-profit	Baccalaureate college	1,384	1861	HLC, CCNE, NASM, TCATE
Maharishi International University	Fairfield	Private not-for-profit	Master's university	2,592	1971	HLC
Mercy College of Health Sciences	Des Moines	Private not-for-profit	Special-focus institution	869	1899	HLC, APTA, CCNE, JRCERT, JRCNMT, NLNAC
Morningside University	Sioux City	Private not-for-profit	Baccalaureate college	2,056	1894	HLC, CCNE, NASM, TCATE
Mount Mercy University	Cedar Rapids	Private not-for-profit	Baccalaureate college	1,417	1928	HLC, CCNE
Northwestern College	Orange City	Private not-for-profit	Baccalaureate college	1,705	1882	HLC, CCNE, TCATE
Palmer College of Chiropractic	Davenport	Private not-for-profit	Special-focus institution	2,161	1897	HLC, CCE
Simpson College	Indianola	Private not-for-profit	Baccalaureate college	1,251	1860	HLC, NASM
St. Ambrose University	Davenport	Private not-for-profit	Master's university	2,498	1882	HLC, AOTA, APTA, CCNE, TCATE
St. Luke's College	Sioux City	Private not-for-profit	Special-focus institution	176	1966	HLC, JRCERT, NLNAC
University of Dubuque	Dubuque	Private not-for-profit	Master's university	1,757	1852	HLC, ATSCA, CCNE
Upper Iowa University	Fayette	Private not-for-profit	Master's university	3,941	1857	HLC, CCNE
Wartburg College	Waverly	Private not-for-profit	Baccalaureate college	1,483	1852	HLC, NASM, NAST
Wartburg Theological Seminary	Dubuque	Private not-for-profit	Special-focus institution	161	1854	ATSCA, HLC
William Penn University	Oskaloosa	Private not-for-profit	Baccalaureate college	1,425	1873	HLC
Waldorf University	Forest City	Private for-profit	Baccalaureate college	2,225	1903	HLC

== Defunct institutions ==
Institution	Location(s)	Control	Founded	Closed	Ref(s)
AIB College of Business	Des Moines	Private	1921	2016	
Algona College	Algona	Private	1868	1875	
Ashford University	Clinton	Private for-profit	1918	2016 (Note: Ashford University closed its physical campus in 2016 and operates online only, based out of San Diego, California.)	
Charles City College	Charles City	Private	1891	1914 (merged into Morningside College)	
Des Moines University	Des Moines	Private	1865	1929	
Grundy College	Grundy Center, Iowa	Private	1916	1934	
Highland Park College	Des Moines	Private	1890	1918 (merged with Des Moines College)	
Iowa Wesleyan University	Mount Pleasant	Private not-for-profit	1842	2023	
Kaplan University	various	Private for-profit	1937	2018	
Leander Clark College	Toledo	Private	1857	1918 (merged into Coe College)	
Lenox College	Hopkinton	Private	1859	1944	
Marycrest International University	Davenport	Private	1939	2002	
Midwestern College	Denison	Private	1965	1970	
Ottumwa Heights College	Ottumwa	Private	1864	1980	
Parsons College	Fairfield	Private	1875	1973	
Sioux Empire College	Hawarden	Public	1965	1985	
Tabor College	Tabor	Private	1853	1927	
Vatterott College	Des Moines	Private for-profit	1969	2018	
Vennard College	University Park	Private	1910	2008	
Westmar University	Le Mars	Private	1890	1997	
Wilton German English College	Wilton	Private	1894	1904	

== Key ==
Abbreviation	Accrediting agency
AAMFT	American Association for Marriage and Family Therapy
AANA	American Association of Nurse Anesthetists
ABA	American Bar Association
ABFSE	American Board of Funeral Service Education
ABHE	Association for Biblical Higher Education
ABHES	Accrediting Bureau of Health Education Schools
ACCSC	Accrediting Commission of Career Schools and Colleges
ACICS	Accrediting Council for Independent Colleges and Schools
ACPE	Accreditation Council for Pharmacy Education
ACPE	Association for Clinical Pastoral Education
ADA	American Dental Association
ADA	American Dietetic Association
AOA	American Osteopathic Association
AOTA	American Occupational Therapy Association
APA	American Psychological Association
APMA	American Podiatric Medical Association
APTA	American Physical Therapy Association
ASHA	American Speech–Language–Hearing Association
ATSCA	Association of Theological Schools in the United States and Canada
AVMA	American Veterinary Medical Association
CAHME	Commission on the Accreditation of Healthcare Management Education
CCE	Council on Chiropractic Education
CCNE	Commission on Collegiate Nursing Education
CELPA	Commission on English Language Program Accreditation
CEPH	Council on Education for Public Health
JRCERT	Joint Review Committee on Education Programs in Radiologic Technology
JRCNMT	Joint Review Committee on Educational Programs in Nuclear Medicine Technology
LCME	Liaison Committee on Medical Education
NASAD	National Association of Schools of Art and Design
NASD	National Association of Schools of Dance
NASM	National Association of Schools of Music
NAST	National Association of Schools of Theatre
HLC	Higher Learning Commission
NCATE	National Council for Accreditation of Teacher Education
NLNAC	National League for Nursing

== See also ==
- List of college athletic programs in Iowa
- Higher education in the United States
- Lists of American universities and colleges
- List of recognized higher education accreditation organizations
