= List of colleges and universities in Massachusetts =

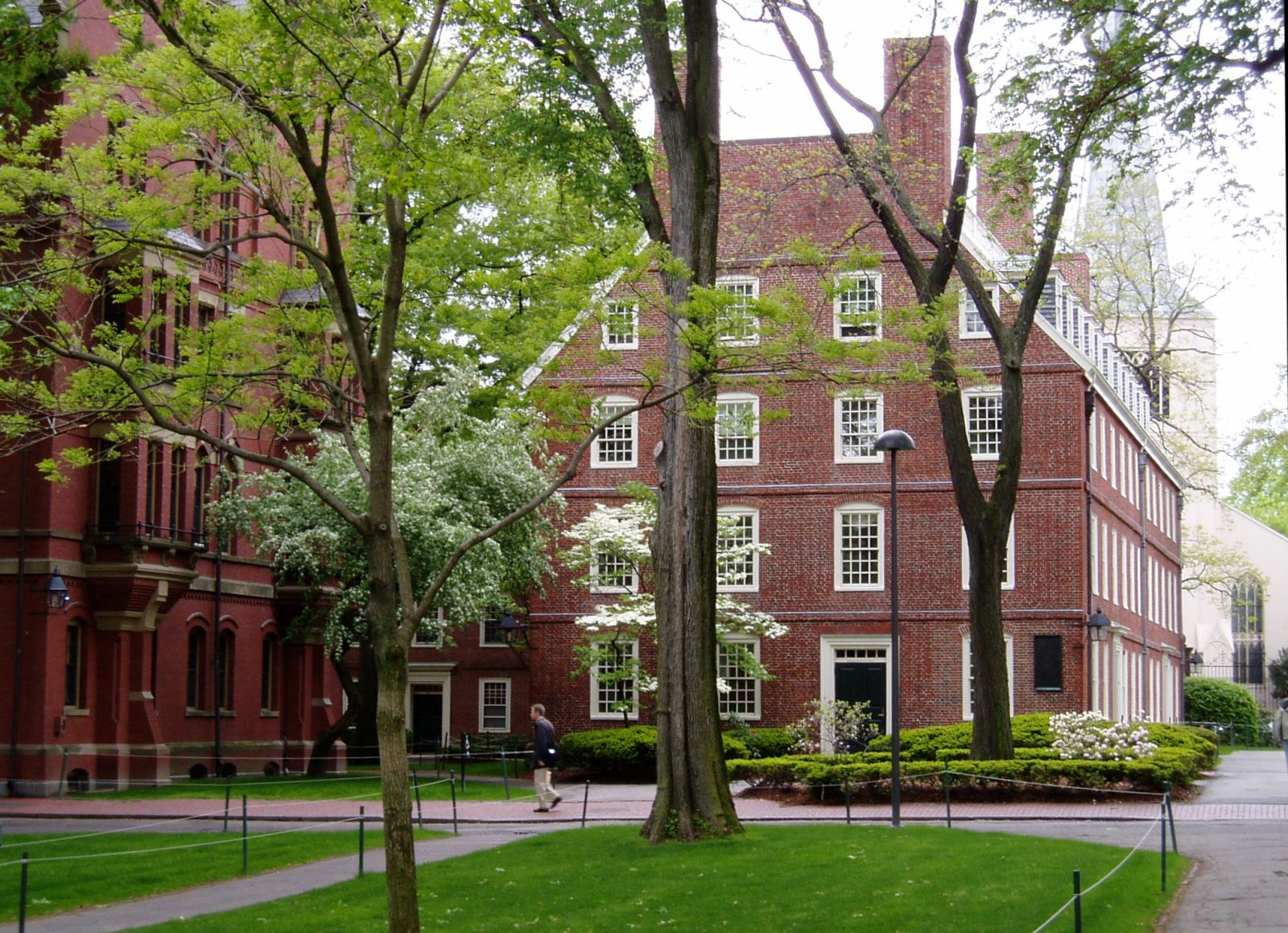
Massachusetts Hall at Harvard University

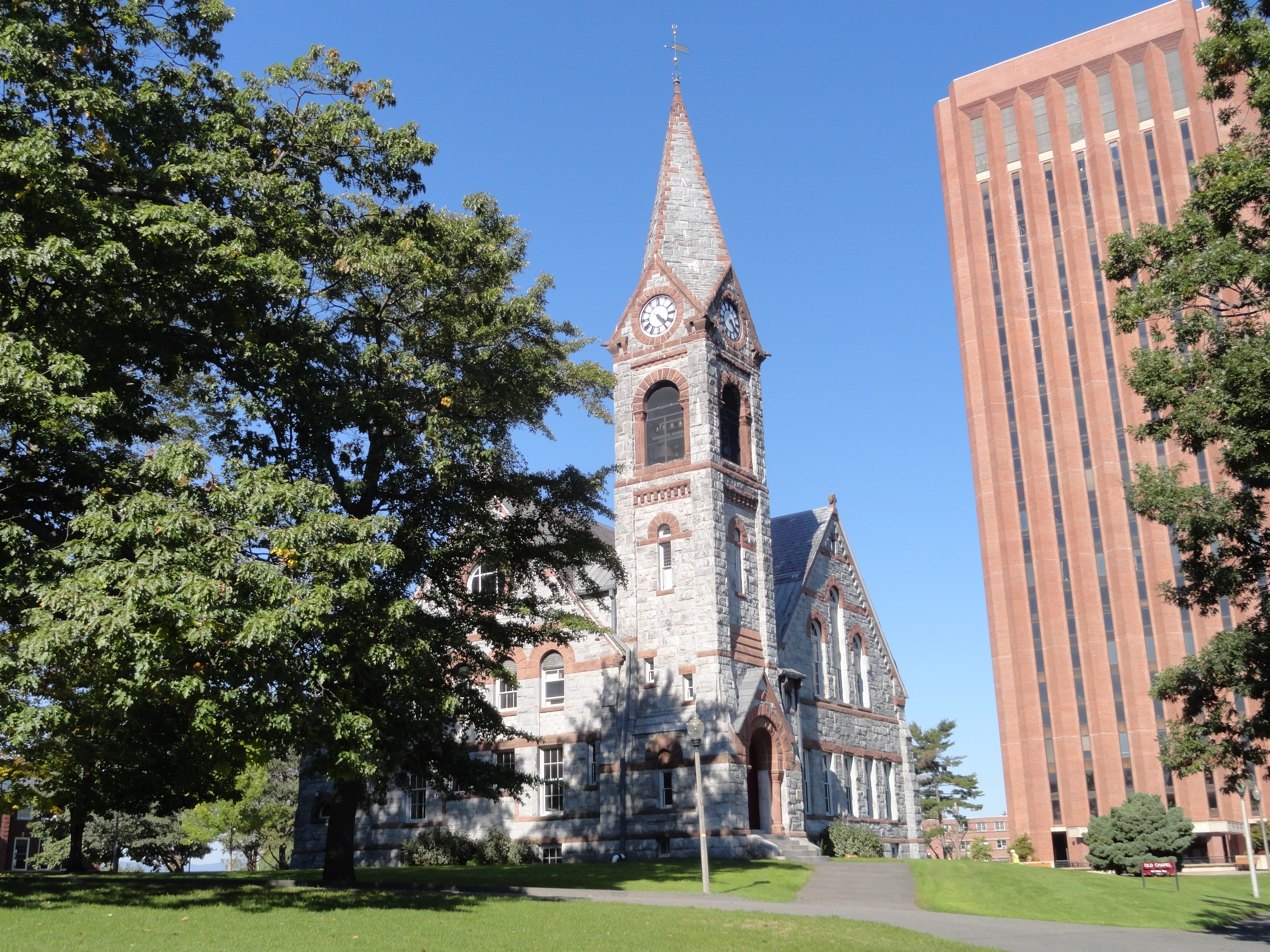
Old Chapel at the University of Massachusetts Amherst with the W. E. B. Du Bois Library in the background

There are 100 colleges and universities in the Commonwealth of Massachusetts that are listed under the Carnegie Classification of Institutions of Higher Education. Of Massachusetts post-secondary institutions, 93 are officially recognized by the New England Commission of Higher Education (NECHE), while most are accredited by multiple higher education accreditation agencies.

These institutions include fourteen research universities, twenty-one master's universities, and thirty-four special-focus institutions. Eighty-five of Massachusetts' post-secondary institutions are private, of which five are for-profit. Thirty of the state's post-secondary institutions are public, a number which excludes the Massachusetts Institute of Technology, which was founded by the Morrill Land-Grant Acts, but later became a private institution.

Harvard University is the state's oldest post-secondary institution, having been founded in 1636. Boston University is the state's largest institution of higher learning in terms of enrollment, having 36,624 students in the fall of 2023 while Conway School of Landscape Design is the state's smallest college with an enrollment of 18. The University of Massachusetts Amherst is the state's largest public university, with an enrollment of 28,518 students. Massachusetts is also home to a number of internationally recognized universities, including Harvard and the Massachusetts Institute of Technology, which are ranked among the top ten universities in the world.

The University of Massachusetts Amherst is the state's sole public land-grant university, and is the flagship institution of the University of Massachusetts system. There are also eleven Catholic post-secondary institutions, including Boston College, the College of the Holy Cross, Merrimack College and Stonehill College. There are also two Judaic post-secondary institutions in Massachusetts, Brandeis University and Hebrew College. The state has four medical schools: Boston University School of Medicine, Harvard Medical School, the University of Massachusetts Medical School, and Tufts University School of Medicine. There are eight law schools which are accredited by the American Bar Association and one, Massachusetts School of Law, which is not ABA accredited but instead accredited by the New England Commission of Higher Education.

== Current institutions ==
School	Location (Note: Based on the Carnegie Classification of Institutions of Higher Education.)	Control	Type	Enrollment (fall 2024)	Founded	Accreditation
American International College	Springfield	Private not-for-profit	Master's university	2,037	1885	AOTA, APTA, CCNE, NECHE
Amherst College	Amherst	Private not-for-profit	Baccalaureate college	1,914	1821	NECHE
Assumption University	Worcester	Private not-for-profit	Master's university	2,037	1904	NECHE, CCNE
Babson College	Wellesley	Private not-for-profit	Special-focus institution	3,932	1919	NECHE
Bay Path University	Longmeadow	Private not-for-profit	Master's university	2,605	1897	AOTA, CCNE, NECHE
Benjamin Franklin Cummings Institute of Technology	Boston	Private not-for-profit	Baccalaureate/associate's college	744	1908	NECHE
Bentley University	Waltham	Private not-for-profit	Master's university	5,333	1917	NECHE
Berklee College of Music	Boston	Private not-for-profit	Master's university	8,369	1945	NECHE
Berkshire Community College	Pittsfield	Public	Associate's college	1,694	1960	APTA, ACEN, NECHE
Boston Architectural College	Boston	Private not-for-profit	Special-focus institution	853	1889	NECHE
Boston Baptist College	Milton	Private not-for-profit	Special-focus institution	43	1976	TRACS
Boston College	Chestnut Hill	Private not-for-profit	Research university	15,234	1863	AANA, ABA, APA, ATS, CNE, NECHE
Boston Graduate School of Psychoanalysis	Brookline	Private not-for-profit	Special-focus institution	169	1973	NECHE
Boston University	Boston	Private not-for-profit	Research university	37,737	1839	ABA, ADA, ACEND, AOTA, APTA, APA, ASHA, ATS, CEA, CEPH, LCME, NASM, NECHE
Brandeis University	Waltham	Private not-for-profit	Research university	4,696	1948	NECHE
Bridgewater State University	Bridgewater	Public	Master's university	9,492	1840	ASHA, NECHE
Bristol Community College	Fall River, New Bedford, Taunton, Attleboro	Public	Associate's college	6,950	1965	ACEN, ADA, AOTA, COMTA, NECHE
Bunker Hill Community College	Boston	Public	Associate's college	9,876	1973	ACEN, CEA, JRCERT, NECHE
Cambridge College	Cambridge	Private not-for-profit	Master's university	1,835	1971	NECHE
Cape Cod Community College	West Barnstable	Public	Associate's college	3,260	1961	ACEN, ADA, NECHE
Clark University	Worcester	Private not-for-profit	Research university	3,275	1887	APA, NECHE
College of Our Lady of the Elms	Chicopee	Private not-for-profit	Master's university	1,268	1928	CCNE, NECHE
College of the Holy Cross	Worcester	Private not-for-profit	Baccalaureate college	3,256	1843	NECHE
Conway School of Landscape Design	Northampton	Private not-for-profit	Special-focus institution	17	1972	NECHE
Curry College	Milton	Private not-for-profit	Master's university	1,994	1879	CCNE, NECHE
Dean College	Franklin	Private not-for-profit	Baccalaureate college	1,092	1865	NECHE
Emerson College	Boston	Private not-for-profit	Master's university	5,263	1880	ASHA, NECHE,
Emmanuel College	Boston	Private not-for-profit	Baccalaureate college	1,954	1919	CCNE, NECHE
Endicott College	Beverly	Private not-for-profit	Master's university	4,394	1939	ACEN, CCNE, NECHE
FINE Mortuary College	Norwood	Private for-profit	Special-focus institution	185	1996	American Board of Funeral Service Education
Fisher College	Boston	Private not-for-profit	Baccalaureate college	1,652	1903	NECHE
Fitchburg State University	Fitchburg	Public	Master's university	5,892	1894	CCNE, NECHE
Framingham State University	Framingham	Public	Master's university	3,529	1839	ACEN, ACEND, CCNE, NECHE, NLNAC
Franklin W Olin College of Engineering	Needham	Private not-for-profit	Special-focus institution	405	1997	NECHE
Gordon College	Wenham	Private not-for-profit	Baccalaureate college	1,595	1889	NECHE
Gordon–Conwell Theological Seminary	South Hamilton	Private not-for-profit	Special-focus institution	1,352	1969	ATS, NECHE
Greenfield Community College	Greenfield	Public	Associate's college	1,689	1962	ACEN, COMTA, NECHE
Hampshire College	Amherst	Private not-for-profit	Baccalaureate college	844	1965	NECHE
Harvard University	Cambridge	Private not-for-profit	Research university	30,259	1636	ABA, ADA, APA, ATS, CEPH, LCME, NECHE
Hebrew College	Newton	Private not-for-profit	Special-focus institution	163	1921	NECHE
Hellenic College Holy Cross Greek Orthodox School of Theology	Brookline	Private not-for-profit	Baccalaureate college	274	1937	ATS, NECHE
Holyoke Community College	Holyoke	Public	Associate's college	4,200	1946	ACEN, JRCERT, NECHE
Hult International Business School	Cambridge	Private not-for-profit	Special-focus institution	2,008	1964	NECHE
Lasell University	Newton	Private not-for-profit	Master's university	1,454	1851	NECHE
Lesley University	Cambridge	Private not-for-profit	Doctorate-granting university	2,557	1909	NECHE
Longy School of Music of Bard College	Cambridge	Private not-for-profit	Special-focus institution	317	1915	NASM
Massachusetts Bay Community College	Wellesley	Public	Associate's college	4,578	1961	NECHE
Massachusetts College of Art and Design	Boston	Public	Special-focus institution	1,989	1873	NASAD, NECHE
Massachusetts College of Liberal Arts	North Adams	Public	Baccalaureate college	896	1894	JRCERT, NECHE
Massachusetts College of Pharmacy and Health Sciences	Boston, Worcester, Manchester	Private not-for-profit	Special-focus institution	5,945	1823	ACAHM, ACPE, ADA, CCNE, CEPH, JRCERT, NECHE
Massachusetts Institute of Technology	Cambridge	Private not-for-profit	Research university	11,886	1861	NECHE
Massachusetts Maritime Academy	Bourne	Public	Master's university	1,488	1891	NECHE
Massachusetts School of Law	Andover	Private not-for-profit	Special-focus institution	273	1988	NECHE
Massasoit Community College	Brockton, Middleboro, Canton	Public	Associate's college	5,574	1966	ACEN, JRCERT, NECHE
Merrimack College	North Andover	Private not-for-profit	Master's university	5,862	1947	ACEND, CCNE, NECHE
MGH Institute of Health Professions	Boston	Private not-for-profit	Special-focus institution	1,672	1977	ACEN, AOTA, APTA, ASHA, CCNE, JRCERT, NECHE
Middlesex Community College	Lowell, Bedford	Public	Associate's college	9,374	1970	JRCERT, NECHE
Montserrat College of Art	Beverly	Private not-for-profit	Baccalaureate college	227	1970	NASAD, NECHE
Mount Holyoke College	South Hadley	Private not-for-profit	Baccalaureate college	2,275	1837	NECHE
Mount Wachusett Community College	Gardner	Public	Associate's college	3,694	1963	ACEN, ADA, COMTA, NECHE
New England College of Optometry	Boston	Private not-for-profit	Special-focus institution	515	1894	AOA, NECHE
New England Conservatory of Music	Boston	Private not-for-profit	Special-focus institution	853	1867	NASM, NECHE
New England Law Boston	Boston	Private not-for-profit	Special-focus institution	1,131	1938	ABA
Nichols College	Dudley	Private not-for-profit	Master's university	1,392	1931	NECHE
North Shore Community College	Danvers	Public	Associate's college	5,743	1965	ACEN, AOTA, APTA, JRCERT, NECHE
Northeastern University	Boston	Private not-for-profit	Research university	39,964	1898	ABA, ACPE, APTA, APA, ASHA, CCNE, CANAEP, CEPH, NECHE
Northern Essex Community College	Haverhill	Public	Associate's college	4,721	1972	NECHE
Pope St. John XXIII National Seminary	Weston	Private not-for-profit	Special-focus institution	33	1964	ATS
Quincy College	Quincy	Public	Associate's college	3,022	1958	ACEN, NECHE
Quinsigamond Community College	Worcester	Public	Associate's college	7,811	1963	ACEN, ADA, AOTA, JRCERT, NECHE
Regis College	Weston	Private not-for-profit	Master's university	2,517	1927	ACEN, ADA, AOTA, ASHA, NECHE
Roxbury Community College	Roxbury	Public	Associate's college	2,044	1973	ACEN, JRCERT, NECHE
Saint John's Seminary	Brighton	Private not-for-profit	Special-focus institution	86	1884	ATS, NECHE
Sattler College	Boston	Private not-for-profit	Not classified	57	2016	TRACS
Salem State University	Salem	Public	Master's university	6,230	1854	ACEN, AOTA, CCNE, NECHE
Simmons University	Boston	Private not-for-profit	Doctorate-granting university	4,666	1899	ACEND, APTA, CCNE, CEPH, NECHE
Smith College	Northampton	Private not-for-profit	Baccalaureate college	2,915	1875	NECHE
Springfield College	Springfield	Private not-for-profit	Doctorate-granting university	2,979	1885	AOTA, APA, APTA, NECHE
Springfield Technical Community College	Springfield	Public	Associate's college	5,447	1967	ACEN, ADA, AOTA, APTA, COMTA, JRCERT, NECHE
Stonehill College	Easton	Private not-for-profit	Baccalaureate college	2,674	1948	NECHE
Suffolk University	Boston	Private not-for-profit	Research university	6,403	1906	ABA, APA, JRCERT, NECHE
Tufts University	Medford, Somerville	Private not-for-profit	Research university	13,599	1852	AOTA, AVMA, NECHE
University of Massachusetts Amherst	Amherst	Public	Research university	31,318	1863	ACEND, APA, ASHA, CCNE, CEPH, NECHE
University of Massachusetts Boston	Boston	Public	Research university	15,428	1964	APA, CCNE, NECHE
University of Massachusetts Chan Medical School	Worcester	Public	Special-focus institution	1,489	1962	CCNE, JRCERT, LCME, NECHE
University of Massachusetts Dartmouth	Dartmouth	Public	Research university	7,968	1895	ACEN, CCNE, NECHE
University of Massachusetts Lowell	Lowell	Public	Research university	16,598	1894	ACEND, APTA, CCNE, CEPH, NECHE
Urban College of Boston	Boston	Private not-for-profit	Associate's college	868	1993	NECHE
Wellesley College	Wellesley	Private not-for-profit	Baccalaureate college	2,285	1875	NECHE
Wentworth Institute of Technology	Boston	Private not-for-profit	Master's university	4,191	1904	NECHE
Western New England University	Springfield	Private not-for-profit	Doctorate-granting university	3,674	1919	ABA, ACPE, AOTA, NECHE
Westfield State University	Westfield	Public	Master's university	4,588	1839	CCNE, NECHE
Wheaton College	Norton	Private not-for-profit	Baccalaureate college	1,785	1834	NECHE
William James College	Newton	Private not-for-profit	Special-focus institution	967	1974	APA, NECHE
Williams College	Williamstown	Private not-for-profit	Baccalaureate college	2,150	1793	NECHE
Worcester Polytechnic Institute	Worcester	Private not-for-profit	Research university	7,388	1865	NECHE
Worcester State University	Worcester	Public	Master's university	5,745	1874	ACEN, AOTA, ASHA, CCNE, NECHE

Key
Abbreviation	Accrediting agency
AAMFT	American Association for Marriage and Family Therapy
AANA	American Association of Nurse Anesthesiology
ACPE	Accreditation Council for Pharmacy Education
ACAHM	Accreditation Commission for Acupuncture and Herbal Medicine
ABA	American Bar Association
ABHE	Association for Biblical Higher Education
ACEN	Accreditation Commission for Education in Nursing
ACEND	Accreditation Council for Education in Nutrition and Dietetics
ACPE	Association for Clinical Pastoral Education
ADA	American Dental Association
AOTA	American Occupational Therapy Association
AOA	American Optometric Association
APTA	American Physical Therapy Association
APA	American Psychological Association
ASHA	American Speech–Language–Hearing Association
ATS	Association of Theological Schools in the United States and Canada
AVMA	American Veterinary Medical Association
CAHME	Commission on the Accreditation of Healthcare Management Education
CCNE	Commission on Collegiate Nursing Education
CEA	Commission on English Language Program Accreditation
CEPH	Council on Education for Public Health
COMTA	Commission on Massage Therapy Accreditation
JRCERT	Joint Review Committee on Education in Radiologic Technology
LCME	Liaison Committee on Medical Education
NASAD	National Association of Schools of Art and Design
NASM	National Association of Schools of Music
NECHE	New England Commission of Higher Education
NLNAC	National League for Nursing Accrediting Commission

== Unaccredited institutions ==
Two schools are recognized by the state as a degree-granting institution, but have not been accredited by a recognized accrediting body:

- Boston Islamic Seminary — Boston
- Knowles Johnson Institute of Graduate Studies - Rockport

== Defunct institutions ==
Campus of Bradford Academy, ca. 1905

At least eighty-two colleges and universities have closed in Massachusetts, beginning with Worcester Medical Institute in 1859. Defunct institutes include multiple private institutions, and the public Hyannis State Teachers College. Many schools were also merged into modern public universities, which form the origins of the Boston, Dartmouth, and Lowell campuses of the University of Massachusetts system. Many of these were private institutions, which either merged with private institutions and ceased to grant degrees, or institutions like the Swedenborg School of Religion, which merged with the Pacific School of Religion upon its relocation to California. The Bible Normal School was founded in Massachusetts but moved to Connecticut before it was merged into the Hartford Seminary. However, this excludes institutions which operated as part of for-profit corporations incorporated in other states, such as Empire Beauty Schools and the University of Phoenix, as they were not operated as separate college campuses and operated more as corporate entities.

List of defunct institutions in Massachusetts
School
Andover Theological Seminary
Andover Junior College
Andover Institute of Business
Andover Newton Theological Seminary
Anna Maria College
Aquinas College
ArsDigita University
Art Institute of Boston
Atlantic Union College
Bard College at Simon's Rock

(moved to Barrytown, New York in Fall 2025)

Bay State College
Becker College
Berkshire Christian College
Berkshire Medical College
Boston Business School
Boston Female Medical School
Boston State College
Bouvé College
Bradford College
Bradford Durfee College of Technology
Bryant & Stratton Business Institute
Bryant McIntosh College
Burdett College
Bussey Institution
Calvin Coolidge College
Cambridge Junior College
Campbell School
Cardinal Cushing College
Cardinal O'Connell Seminary
Cape Cod Hospital School of Nursing
Central New England College
Chamberlayne Junior College
Chandler School for Women
College of Physicians and Surgeons
College of Saint Joseph
Comers Commercial College
Coyne School of Technical Electricity
Crane Theological School
Divine Providence Institute
Eastern Nazarene College
Episcopal Divinity School
Garland Junior College
Grahm Junior College
Hallmark Institute of Photography
Hampden College of Pharmacy
Holliston Junior College
Hyannis State Teachers College
Ipswich Female Seminary
Kinyon-Campbell Business School
Kinyon School
Labouré College
LaFosse Teacher Training College
Lay College
Leicester Junior College
Lowell State College
Lowell Technological Institute
Marian Court College
Marist College and Seminary
Massachusetts College of Osteopathy
Middlesex University
Monroe College of Oratory
Mount Alvernia College
Mount Ida College
New Bedford Institute of Technology
New England Female Medical College
New England Institute of Applied Funeral Arts and Sciences
New England Institute of Art
New England School of Photography
Newbury College
Newton College of the Sacred Heart
Newton Junior College
Newton Theological Institution
Northampton Junior College
Northpoint Bible College
Oblate College & Seminary
Oread Institute
Our Lady of Sorrows
Perry Normal School
Pine Manor College
Queen of Apostles Seminary
Radcliffe College
Regina Coeli College
Revere Lay College
Sacred Heart College for Teachers
Saint Gabriel's Institute
Saint Hyacinth College & Seminary
Saint Joseph Teacher Training Institute
Saint Paul's House of Studies
Saint Stephen's College
School for Christian Workers
School of the Museum of Fine Arts, Boston
Southern New England School of Law
Staley School of the Spoken Word
Stanley College
Stevens College
Swain School of Design
Swedenborg School of Religion
Vesper George School of Art
Wang Institute of Graduate Studies
Wheelock College
Winter Hill Business College
Worcester Junior College
Worcester Medical Institute
Worcester Technical Institute

== Forbes National Rankings ==
The Forbes National Colleges Ranking is a ranking system for the best four-year colleges in the United States. These colleges are ranked for their alumni salary, debt, return on investment, graduation rate, membership in Forbes honors lists such as Forbes 30 Under 30, student retention, and academic achievement. As of 2026, Forbes recognizes the University of Massachusetts Amherst as the flagship public university and Massachusetts Institute of Technology as the flagship private university in Massachusetts.

Forbes Massachusetts Public Rankings
MA*	Forbes	Institution
1	135	UMass Amherst
2	329	UMass Lowell
3	397	UMass Boston
4	402	Mass Maritime
*State rankings based on Forbes ranking

Forbes Massachusetts Private Rankings
MA*	Forbes	Institution
1	1	MIT
2	3	Harvard
3	19	Williams
4	30	Amherst
5	38	Boston University
6	40	Wellesley
7	51	Boston College
8	54	Tufts
9	67	Holy Cross
10	69	Northeastern
11	86	Babson
12	107	Smith
13	117	Brandeis
14	125	Olin
15	182	Bentley
16	190	WPI
17	300	Mount Holyoke
18	340	Clark
19	363	Wentworth
20	364	Stonehill
21	386	Emmanuel
22	399	Assumption
23	412	Simmons
24	491	Emerson
*State rankings based on Forbes ranking

== See also ==
- List of college athletic programs in Massachusetts
- List of engineering schools in Massachusetts
- List of law schools in Massachusetts
- List of colleges and universities in metropolitan Boston
- Colleges of Worcester Consortium
- Higher education in the United States
- Lists of American institutions of higher education
- List of recognized higher education accreditation organizations
