= List of colleges and universities in Michigan =

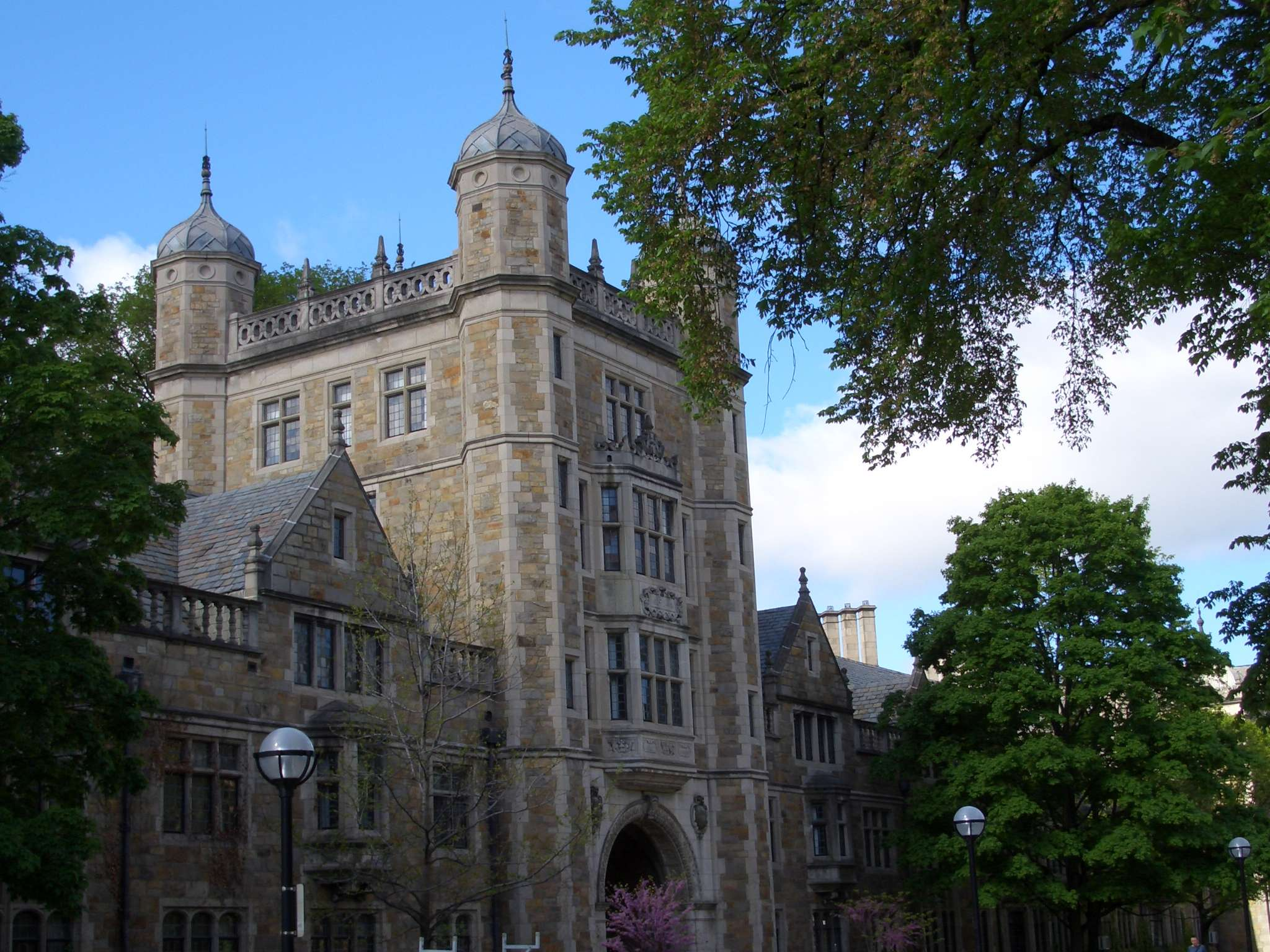
Lawyer's Club at the University of Michigan

There are ninety-three colleges and universities in the U.S. state of Michigan that are listed under the Carnegie Classification of Institutions of Higher Education. These institutions include eight research universities, five doctoral/professional universities, fourteen master's universities, and fourteen baccalaureate colleges, as well as thirty-one associates colleges. In addition, there are nineteen institutions classified as special-focus institutions, eleven labeled as baccalaureate/associate's colleges, and two tribal colleges which operate in the state.

The University of Michigan, founded in 1817–twenty years before Michigan's statehood–is the state's oldest university and remained the only university in the state until the 20th century, when Detroit College became the University of Detroit in 1911 and Wayne State University achieved "university" status in 1933 following the consolidation of the City of Detroit's colleges by the Detroit Board of Education into Wayne University. Since then, Michigan's higher education landscape has experienced two significant periods of reconstruction. The first, from 1955 to 1964, was fueled by the rising demand for higher education from returning World War II veterans and the baby boom; during this time, Michigan State College of Agriculture and Applied Science and Western Michigan College attained university status in 1955 and 1957, respectively. This was followed by Central Michigan Normal School and Eastern Michigan College in 1959, and later by Northern Michigan College and Michigan College of Mining and Technology between 1963 and 1964. The second period of reconstruction took place in 1987 when Ferris State, Grand Valley State, Saginaw Valley State, and Lake Superior State were all granted university status.

The state has seven medical schools, (Note: The state's seven medical schools are the Michigan State University College of Human Medicine, Michigan State University College of Osteopathic Medicine, Michigan Medicine, Oakland University William Beaumont School of Medicine, Wayne State University School of Medicine, Central Michigan University College of Medicine, and Western Michigan University Homer Stryker M.D. School of Medicine.) as well as five law schools (Note: The state's five law schools are the University of Michigan Law School, Michigan State University College of Law, Wayne State University Law School, University of Detroit Mercy School of Law, and Western Michigan University Cooley Law School.) which are accredited by the American Bar Association. The majority of Michigan's post-secondary institutions are accredited by the Higher Learning Commission (HLC). Most are accredited by multiple agencies, such as the Commission on Collegiate Nursing Education (CCNE), the National Association of Schools of Music (NASM), and the National League for Nursing (NLNAC).

== Extant institutions ==
=== Research universities ===
School	Location (Note: School location is based on the Carnegie Classification of Institutions of Higher Education.)	Control (Note: School control is based on the Carnegie Classification of Institutions of Higher Education.)	Type (Note: School types are based on the Carnegie Classification of Institutions of Higher Education.)	Undergraduate enrollment (fall 2024)	Graduate enrollment (fall 2024)	Founded	Accreditation
Central Michigan University	Mount Pleasant	Public	Doctoral university with high research activity (R2)	10,193	4,295	1892	HLC, AND, APTA, APA, ASHA, CCNE, CEPH, LCME, NASAD, NASM
Eastern Michigan University	Ypsilanti	Public	Doctoral university with high research activity (R2)	10,470	2,161	1849	HLC, AND, AOTA, APA, ASHA, CCNE, CEA, CEPH, NASM, NASAD
Michigan State University	East Lansing	Public	Doctoral university with very high research activity (R1)	41,234	10,855	1855	HLC, ABA, AND, AOA, APA, ASHA, AVMA, CCNE, CEA, CEPH, COA, LCME, NASM
Michigan Technological University	Houghton	Public	Doctoral university with very high research activity (R1)	6,013	1,390	1885	HLC
Oakland University	Rochester Hills	Public	Doctoral university with high research activity (R2)	12,587	3,181	1957	HLC, ACEN, AND, APTA, CCNE, CEPH, COA, LCME, NASD, NASM, NAST, JRCERT
University of Michigan	Ann Arbor	Public	Doctoral university with very high research activity (R1)	34,454	18,401	1817	HLC, ACME, ACPE, ABA, ADA, AND, APA, CCNE, CEPH, LCME, NASAD, NASD, NASM
Wayne State University	Detroit	Public	Doctoral university with very high research activity (R1)	16,012	7,791	1868	HLC, ACME, ACPE, ABA, ABFSE, AND, AOTA, APTA, APA, ASHA, CCNE, CEPH, COA, JRCERT, LCME, NASM, ABET
Western Michigan University	Kalamazoo	Public	Doctoral university with high research activity (R2)	13,027	3,717	1903	HLC, ABA, AND, AOTA, APA, APTA, ASHA, CCNE, CEA, NASAD, NASD, NASM, NAST

=== Doctoral/professional universities ===
School	Location (Note: School location is based on the Carnegie Classification of Institutions of Higher Education.)	Control (Note: School control is based on the Carnegie Classification of Institutions of Higher Education.)	Type (Note: School types are based on the Carnegie Classification of Institutions of Higher Education.)	Undergraduate enrollment (fall 2024)	Graduate enrollment (fall 2024)	Founded	Accreditation
Andrews University	Berrien Springs	Private not-for-profit	Doctoral/professional university (D/PU)	1,384	1,556	1874	HLC, ACEN, AND, APA, APTA, ASHA, ATS, CEPH, NASM
Ferris State University	Big Rapids	Public	Doctoral/professional university (D/PU)	8,991	968	1884	HLC, ACEN, ACPE, ADA, AOA, CCNE, JRCERT, NASAD
Grand Valley State University	Allendale	Public	Doctoral/professional university (D/PU)	19,002	3,009	1960	HLC, AND, APTA, ASHA, CCNE, CEPH, JRCERT, NASAD, NASM
University of Detroit Mercy	Detroit	Private not-for-profit	Doctoral/professional university (D/PU)	3,422	2,165	1877	HLC, ABA, AOA, APA, CCNE, COA
University of Michigan–Flint	Flint	Public	Doctoral/professional university (D/PU)	5,011	1,518	1956	HLC, AOTA, APTA, CCNE, CEPH, COA, JRCERT, NASM

=== Master's colleges and universities ===
School	Location (Note: School location is based on the Carnegie Classification of Institutions of Higher Education.)	Control (Note: School control is based on the Carnegie Classification of Institutions of Higher Education.)	Type (Note: School types are based on the Carnegie Classification of Institutions of Higher Education.)	Undergraduate enrollment (fall 2024)	Graduate enrollment (fall 2024)	Founded	Accreditation
Baker College	Owosso	Private not-for-profit	Master's university (M2)	3,595	360	1911	HLC, COMTA, AOTA, APTA, CCNE
Calvin University	Grand Rapids	Private not-for-profit	Master's university (M3)	3,356	325	1876	HLC, ASHA, CCNE
Concordia University Ann Arbor	Ann Arbor	Private not-for-profit	Master's university (M3)	755	380	1963	HLC, APTA, CCNE
Cornerstone University	Grand Rapids	Private not-for-profit	Master's university (M1)	1,354	341	1941	HLC, ATS, CCNE
Davenport University	Grand Rapids	Private not-for-profit	Master's university (M1)	3,741	1,074	1866	HLC, ACEN, AOTA, CCNE
Kettering University	Flint	Private not-for-profit	Master's university (M2)	1,212	254	1919	HLC
Lawrence Technological University	Southfield	Private not-for-profit	Master's university (M1)	2,579	1,114	1932	HLC, CCNE, NASAD
Madonna University	Livonia	Private not-for-profit	Master's university (M2)	1,828	296	1937	HLC, ACEN, AND, CCNE
Northern Michigan University	Marquette	Public	Master's university (M2)	6,684	725	1899	HLC, ASHA, CCNE, JRCERT, NASM
Saginaw Valley State University	University Center	Public	Master's university (M1)	6,135	687	1963	HLC, AOTA, CCNE, NASM
Spring Arbor University	Spring Arbor	Private not-for-profit	Master's university (M1)	1,139	1,302	1873	HLC, CCNE
University of Michigan–Dearborn	Dearborn	Public	Master's university (M1)	6,187	1,917	1959	HLC

=== Baccalaureate colleges ===
School	Location (Note: School location is based on the Carnegie Classification of Institutions of Higher Education.)	Control (Note: School control is based on the Carnegie Classification of Institutions of Higher Education.)	Type (Note: School types are based on the Carnegie Classification of Institutions of Higher Education.)	Undergraduate enrollment (fall 2024)	Graduate enrollment (fall 2024)	Founded	Accreditation
Adrian College	Adrian	Private not-for-profit	Baccalaureate College: Diverse Fields.	1,673	92	1859	HLC
Albion College	Albion	Private not-for-profit	Baccalaureate College: Arts & Sciences	1,308	0	1835	HLC, NASM
Alma College	Alma	Private not-for-profit	Baccalaureate College: Diverse Fields	1,159	38	1886	HLC, CCNE, NASM
Aquinas College	Grand Rapids	Private not-for-profit	Baccalaureate College: Arts & Sciences	1,088	69	1886	HLC, NASM
Grace Christian University	Wyoming	Private not-for-profit	Baccalaureate College: Diverse Fields	928	89	1939	HLC, ABHE
Great Lakes Christian College	Lansing	Private not-for-profit	Baccalaureate College: Diverse Fields	210	0	1949	HLC, ABHE
Hillsdale College	Hillsdale	Private not-for-profit	Baccalaureate College: Arts & Sciences	1,649	143	1844	HLC
Hope College	Holland	Private not-for-profit	Baccalaureate College: Arts & Sciences	3,395	0	1866	HLC, CCNE, NASAD, NASD, NASM, NAST, ABET
Kalamazoo College	Kalamazoo	Private not-for-profit	Baccalaureate College: Arts & Sciences	1,166	0	1833	HLC
Kuyper College	Grand Rapids	Private not-for-profit	Baccalaureate College: Diverse Fields	161	0	1939	HLC, ABHE
Lake Superior State University	Sault Ste. Marie	Public	Baccalaureate College: Diverse Fields	1,551	16	1946	HLC, ACEN, CCNE
Rochester Christian University	Rochester Hills	Private not-for-profit	Baccalaureate College: Diverse Fields	1,161	32	1959	HLC, CCNE
Sacred Heart Major Seminary	Detroit	Private not-for-profit	Baccalaureate College: Arts & Sciences	188	163	1919	HLC, ATS
University of Olivet	Olivet	Private not-for-profit	Baccalaureate College: Diverse Fields	932	47	1844	HLC, CCNE

=== Baccalaureate/associate's colleges ===
School	Location (Note: School location is based on the Carnegie Classification of Institutions of Higher Education.)	Control (Note: School control is based on the Carnegie Classification of Institutions of Higher Education.)	Type (Note: School types are based on the Carnegie Classification of Institutions of Higher Education.)	Enrollment (fall 2024)	Founded	Accreditation
Alpena Community College	Alpena	Public	Baccalaureate/associate's college	1,581	1952	HLC, ACEN
Henry Ford College	Dearborn	Public	Baccalaureate/associate's college	11,410	1938	HLC, ACEN, APTA, JRCERT
Jackson College	Jackson	Public	Baccalaureate/associate's college	5,086	1928	HLC, ADA, CNEA, JRCERT
Lake Michigan College	Benton Harbor	Public	Baccalaureate/associate's college	2,937	1946	HLC, ACEN, ADA, AOTA, JRCERT
Northwestern Michigan College	Traverse City	Public	Baccalaureate/associate's college	3,253	1951	HLC, ACEN, ADA
Schoolcraft College	Livonia	Public	Baccalaureate/associate's college	8,587	1964	HLC, ACEN, JRCERT

=== Associate's colleges ===
School	Location (Note: School location is based on the Carnegie Classification of Institutions of Higher Education.)	Control (Note: School control is based on the Carnegie Classification of Institutions of Higher Education.)	Type (Note: School types are based on the Carnegie Classification of Institutions of Higher Education.)	Enrollment (fall 2024)	Founded	Accreditation
Bay de Noc Community College	Escanaba	Public	Associate's college	2,149	1962	HLC, ACEN
Delta College	University Center	Public	Associate's college	8,397	1961	HLC, ACEN, ADA, APTA, JRCERT
Glen Oaks Community College	Centreville	Public	Associate's college	1,183	1965	HLC, ACEN
Gogebic Community College	Ironwood	Public	Associate's college	882	1932	HLC, CNEA
Grand Rapids Community College	Grand Rapids	Public	Associate's college	12,468	1914	HLC, ACEN, ADA, AOTA, JRCERT, NASAD, NASM
Kalamazoo Valley Community College	Kalamazoo	Public	Associate's college	6,334	1966	HLC, ACEN, ADA
Kellogg Community College	Battle Creek	Public	Associate's college	4,036	1956	HLC, ACEN, ADA, APTA, JRCERT
Kirtland Community College	Roscommon	Public	Associate's college	1,905	1966	HLC
Lansing Community College	Lansing	Public	Associate's college	9,821	1957	HLC, ACEN, ADA, CMTA, JRCERT
Macomb Community College	Warren	Public	Associate's college	16,300	1954	HLC, ADA, AOTA
Mid Michigan College	Harrison	Public	Associate's college	3,692	1965	HLC, APTA, JRCERT
Monroe County Community College	Monroe	Public	Associate's college	2,210	1964	HLC, ACEN
Montcalm Community College	Sidney Township	Public	Associate's college	1,751	1965	HLC
Mott Community College	Flint	Public	Associate's college	6,718	1923	HLC, ACEN, ADA
Muskegon Community College	Muskegon	Public	Associate's college	3,617	1926	HLC, ACEN
North Central Michigan College	Petoskey	Public	Associate's college	1,613	1958	HLC, ACEN
Oakland Community College	Bloomfield Hills	Public	Associate's college	15,287	1964	HLC
Southwestern Michigan College	Dowagiac	Public	Associate's college	2,000	1964	HLC, ACEN
St. Clair County Community College	Port Huron	Public	Associate's college	3,317	1923	HLC, ACEN, JRCERT
Washtenaw Community College	Ann Arbor	Public	Associate's college	11,133	1966	HLC, ACEN, ADA, APTA, JRCERT
Wayne County Community College District	Detroit	Public	Associate's college	11,887	1967	HLC, ADA, AND, AOTA, APTA
West Shore Community College	Scottville	Public	Associate's college	1,120	1967	HLC

=== Special-focus institutions ===
School	Location (Note: School location is based on the Carnegie Classification of Institutions of Higher Education.)	Control (Note: School control is based on the Carnegie Classification of Institutions of Higher Education.)	Type (Note: School types are based on the Carnegie Classification of Institutions of Higher Education.)	Undergraduate enrollment (fall 2024)	Graduate enrollment (fall 2024)	Founded	Accreditation
Calvin Theological Seminary	Grand Rapids	Private not-for-profit	Special-focus institution	0	367	1876	ATS
Cleary University	Howell	Private not-for-profit	Special-focus institution	769	235	1883	HLC
College for Creative Studies	Detroit	Private not-for-profit	Special-focus institution	1,376	57	1906	HLC, NASAD
Cranbrook Academy of Art	Bloomfield Hills	Private not-for-profit	Special-focus institution	0	113	1932	HLC, NASAD
Ecumenical Theological Seminary	Detroit	Private not-for-profit	Special-focus institution	11	52	1980	ATS
Michigan School of Psychology	Farmington Hills	Private not-for-profit	Special-focus institution	0	190	1980	HLC, APA
Moody Theological Seminary–Michigan	Plymouth	Private not-for-profit	Special-focus institution			1925	None
Northwood University	Midland	Private not-for-profit	Special-focus institution	2,045	364	1959	HLC
Walsh College	Troy	Private not-for-profit	Special-focus institution	448	460	1922	HLC
Thomas M Cooley Law School	Lansing	Private not-for-profit	Special-focus institution	0	420	1972	HLC, ABA
Western Michigan University Homer Stryker M.D. School of Medicine	Kalamazoo	Private not-for-profit	Special-focus institution	0	346	2011	HLC, LCME
Western Theological Seminary	Holland	Private not-for-profit	Special-focus institution	0	397	1866	ATS
Yeshiva Gedolah of Greater Detroit	Oak Park	Private not-for-profit	Special-focus institution	75	0	1985	AARTS

=== Tribal colleges ===
School	Location (Note: School location is based on the Carnegie Classification of Institutions of Higher Education.)	Control (Note: School control is based on the Carnegie Classification of Institutions of Higher Education.)	Type (Note: School types are based on the Carnegie Classification of Institutions of Higher Education.)	Enrollment (fall 2024)	Founded	Accreditation
Bay Mills Community College	Brimley	Public	Tribal college	698	1984	HLC
Keweenaw Bay Ojibwa Community College	Baraga	Public	Tribal college	243	2009	HLC
Saginaw Chippewa Tribal College	Mount Pleasant	Public	Tribal college	196	1998	HLC

== Defunct institutions ==
School	Location	Control	Founded	Closed	Ref(s)
American Medical Missionary College	Battle Creek	Private not-for-profit	1895	1910	
The Art Institute of Michigan	Novi	Private for-profit	1916	2019	
Detroit Institute of Technology	Detroit	Private not-for-profit	1891	1982	
DeVry University–Michigan	Southfield	Private for-profit	1931	2015	
Duns Scotus College	Southfield	Private not-for-profit	1930	1979	
Finlandia University	Hancock	Private not-for-profit	1896	2023	
Grand Rapids Theological Seminary	Grand Rapids	Private not-for-profit	1948	Merged into Cornerstone University	
Grand Traverse College	Benzonia	Private not-for-profit	1891	1900	
Highland Park Community College	Highland Park	Public	1918	1996	
International Academy of Design and Technology	Troy	Private for-profit	1977	2016	
ITT Technical Institute	Canton, Swartz Creek, Troy, and Wyoming	Private for-profit	1969	2016	
Jordan College	Various	Private not-for-profit	1967	1996	
Mackinac College	Mackinac Island	Private not-for-profit	1966	1973	
Maryglade College	Memphis	Private not-for-profit	1960	1974	
Marygrove College	Detroit	Private not-for-profit	1905	2019	
Michigan Jewish Institute	West Bloomfield Township	Private not-for-profit	1994	2016	
Nazareth College	Kalamazoo	Private not-for-profit	1889	1992	
Robert B. Miller College	Battle Creek	Private not-for-profit	2004	2016	
Saint Mary's College	Orchard Lake Village	Private not-for-profit	1905	2003; Merged into Madonna University	
Siena Heights University	Adrian	Private not-for-profit	1919	2026	
William Tyndale College	Farmington Hills	Private not-for-profit	1945	2004	

== Key ==
Abbreviation	Accrediting agency
AAMFT	American Association for Marriage and Family Therapy
AANA	American Association of Nurse Anesthetists
ABA	American Bar Association
ABET	Accreditation Board for Engineering and Technology
ABFSE	American Board of Funeral Service Education
ACEN	Accrediting Commission for Education in Nursing
ACME	Accreditation Commission for Midwifery Education
ADA	American Dietetic Association
AOA	American Osteopathic Association
AVMA	American Veterinary Medical Association
ACICS	Accrediting Council for Independent Colleges and Schools
ACPE	Accreditation Council for Pharmacy Education
AALE	American Academy for Liberal Education
ADA	American Dental Association
AND	Academy of Nutrition and Dietetics
AOTA	American Occupational Therapy Association
AOA	American Optometric Association
APTA	American Physical Therapy Association
APA	American Psychological Association
ASHA	American Speech–Language–Hearing Association
AARTS	Association of Advanced Rabbinical and Talmudic Schools
ABHE	Association for Biblical Higher Education
ATSCA	Association of Theological Schools in the United States and Canada
CAHME	Commission on the Accreditation of Healthcare Management Education
CCNE	Commission on Collegiate Nursing Education
CEA	Commission on English Language Program Accreditation
CELPA	Commission on English Language Program Accreditation
CMTA	Commission on Massage Therapy Accreditation
CEPH	Council on Education for Public Health
CNEA	Commission for Nursing Education Accreditation
COA	Council on Accreditation of Nurse Anesthesia Educational Programs
COMTA	Commission on Massage Therapy Accreditation
HLC	Higher Learning Commission
JRCERT	Joint Review Committee on Education Programs in Radiologic Technology
LCME	Liaison Committee on Medical Education
MEAC	Midwifery Education Accreditation Council
NASAD	National Association of Schools of Art and Design
NASD	National Association of Schools of Dance
NASM	National Association of Schools of Music
NAST	National Association of Schools of Theatre
NCATE	National Council for Accreditation of Teacher Education
NLNAC	National League for Nursing

== See also ==
- List of college athletic programs in Michigan
- Higher education in the United States
- Lists of American institutions of higher education
- List of recognized higher education accreditation organizations
