= Lists of American colleges and universities =

Below are links to lists of institutions of higher education in the United States (colleges and universities) by geography and other criteria, as well as lists of American institutions located outside the United States and its territories.

== Northeast ==
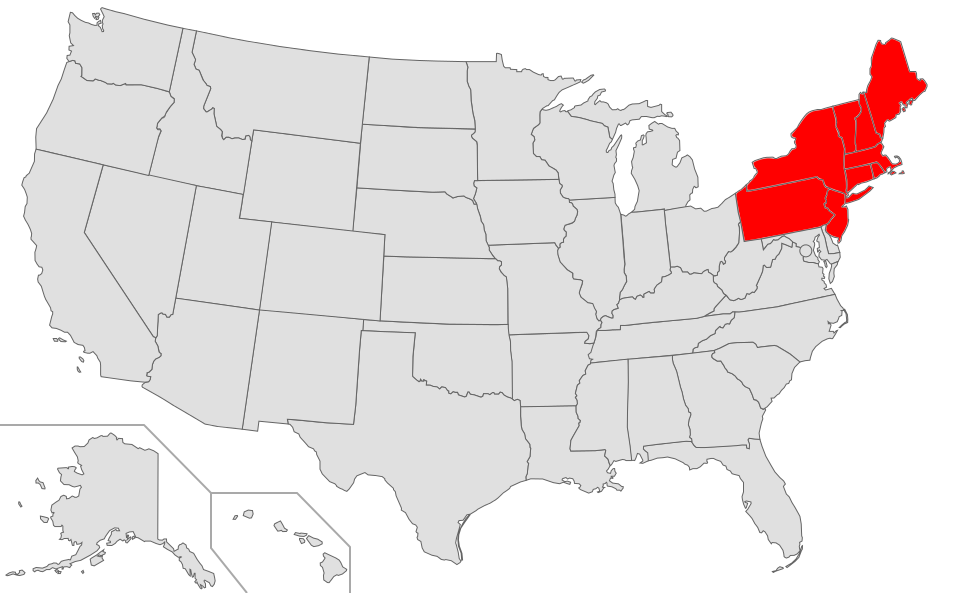
Northeastern United States

- Connecticut
- Maine
- Massachusetts
- New Hampshire
- New Jersey
- New York
- Pennsylvania
- Rhode Island
- Vermont

== Midwest ==
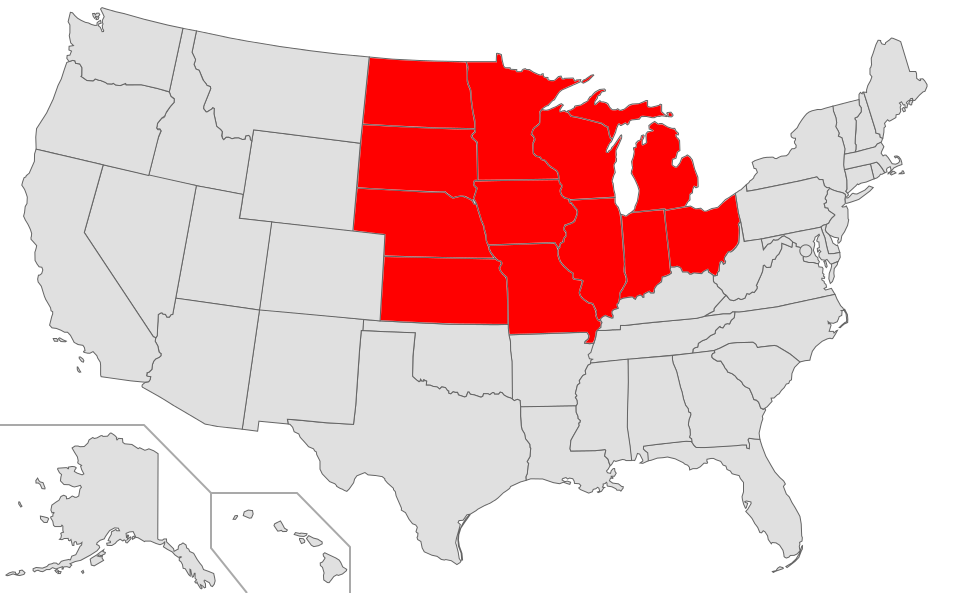
Midwestern United States

- Illinois
- Indiana
- Iowa
- Kansas
- Michigan
- Minnesota
- Missouri
- Nebraska
- North Dakota
- Ohio
- South Dakota
- Wisconsin

== South ==
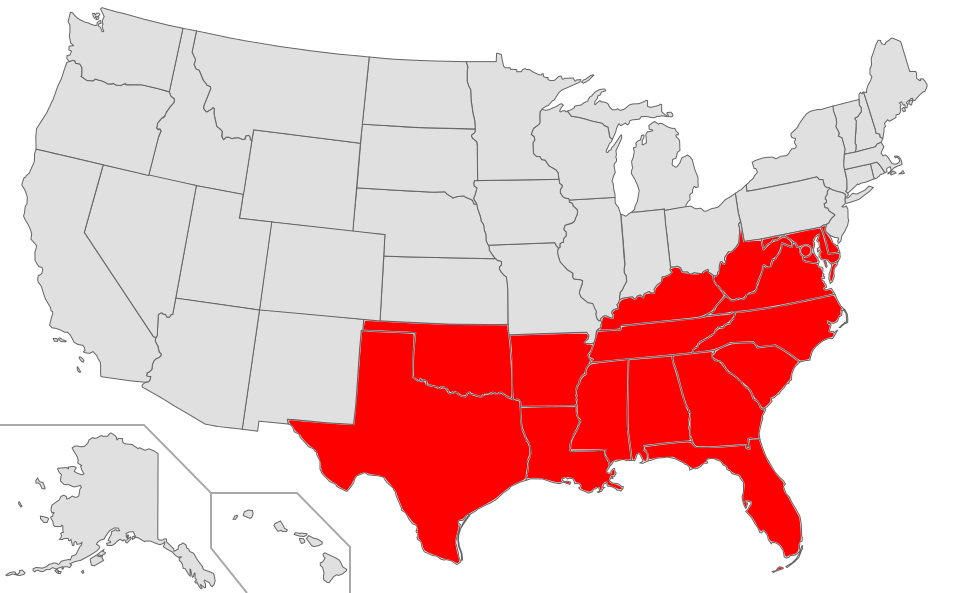
Southern United States

- Alabama
- Arkansas
- Delaware
- Florida
- Georgia
- Kentucky
- Louisiana
- Maryland
- Mississippi
- North Carolina
- Oklahoma
- South Carolina
- Tennessee
- Texas
- Virginia
- West Virginia

== West ==
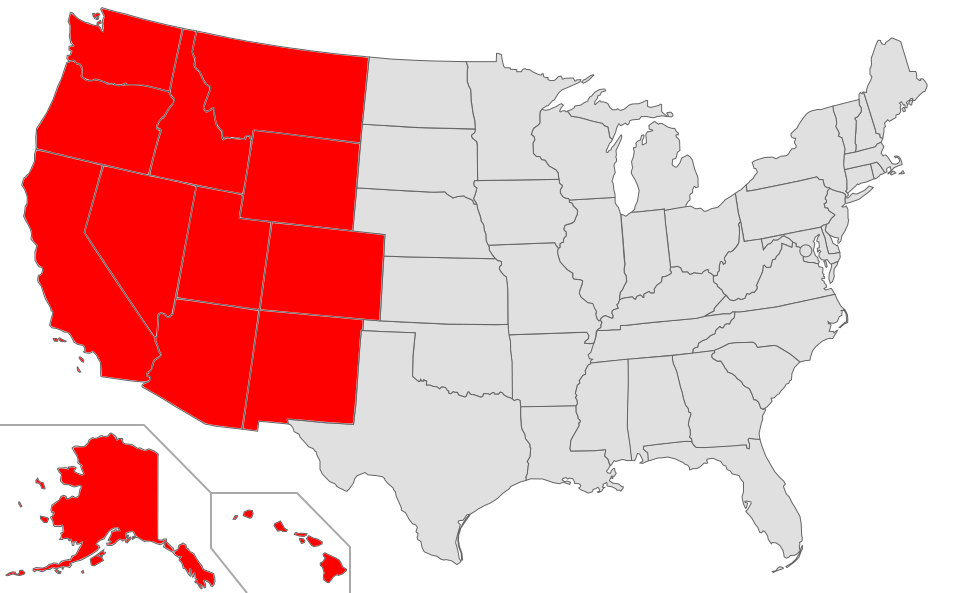
Western United States

- Alaska
- Arizona
- California
- Colorado
- Hawaii
- Idaho
- Montana
- Nevada
- New Mexico
- Oregon
- Utah
- Washington
- Wyoming

== Washington, D.C. ==
- Washington, D.C.

== Insular areas ==
Insular Areas of the United States and the 50 states and Washington, D.C.

- Guam
- Puerto Rico
- U.S. Virgin Islands

Note:

- American Samoa (American Samoa Community College) and the Northern Mariana Islands (Northern Marianas College) have one college each.
- The US insular areas under the Compact of Free Association, namely Palau (Palau Community College), the Federated States of Micronesia (College of Micronesia-FSM), and the Marshall Islands (College of the Marshall Islands) have one college each.
- The United States Minor Outlying Islands do not have any colleges or universities.

== Outside the U.S. and its territories ==
The following list contains international institutions of higher education that are accredited or licensed in the United States. The list includes satellite campuses of universities headquartered within the United States.

- American College Dublin
- American College of Thessaloniki (ACT)
- American College of Greece
- American College of the Mediterranean
- American University in Bulgaria
- American University in Cairo
- American University in Dubai
- American University of Antigua
- American University of Armenia
- American University of Beirut
- American University of Paris
- American University of Rome
- American University of Sharjah
- American University of Nigeria
- Central European University
- Duke Kunshan University (China)
- Franklin University Switzerland
- Girne American University
- George Mason University (Incheon campus)
- Hellenic American University
- Hult International Business School
- John Cabot University
- Kean University (Wenzhou campus)
- Keiser University (Latin American campus)
- Lakeland University (Japan campus)
- Lebanese American University
- McDaniel College Budapest
- New York University (Abu Dhabi campus)
- New York University (Buenos Aires campus)
- New York University (Florence campus)
- New York University Shanghai
- Richmond American University London
- RIT Croatia
- RIT Kosovo
- Rochester Institute of Technology of Dubai
- Saint Louis University (Madrid campus)
- Schiller International University
- St. John's University (Italy campus)
- St. John's University (Paris campus)
- Stony Brook University (Korea campus)
- Temple University (Rome campus)
- Temple University (Japan campus)
- University of America Curacao
- University of Maryland Global Campus
- University of Utah (Incheon campus)
- Webster University (Geneva campus)

== Non-geographical lists ==
- College and university rankings in the United States
- G.I. American universities
- Ivy League universities
- Hispanic-Serving Institution
- List of Baptist colleges and universities in the United States
- List of Catholic universities and colleges in the United States
- List of colleges and universities in the United States by endowment
- List of community colleges in the United States and 50 states community college systems
- List of defunct military academies in the United States
- List of dental schools in the United States
- List of engineering schools in the United States
- List of historically black colleges and universities
- List of Jewish universities and colleges in the United States
- List of law schools in the United States
- List of leaders of universities and colleges in the United States
- List of liberal arts colleges in the United States
- List of Lutheran colleges and universities in the United States
- List of medical schools in the United States
- List of online colleges in the United States
- List of the largest United States colleges and universities by enrollment
- List of tribal colleges and universities § United States
- Lists of universities and colleges
- List of women's universities and colleges in the United States
- Men's colleges in the United States
- Women's colleges in the United States

== See also ==
- Index of colleges and universities in the United States
