= Bachelor of Science in Nursing =

Undergraduate degree in nursing

The Bachelor of Science in Nursing (BSN, BScN) also known in some countries as a Bachelor of Nursing (BN) or Bachelor of Science (BS) with a Major in Nursing is an academic degree in the science and principles of nursing, granted by an accredited tertiary education provider. The course of study is typically three or four years. The difference in degree designation may relate to the amount of basic science courses required as part of the degree, with BScN and BSN degree curriculums requiring completion of more courses on math and natural sciences that are more typical of BSc degrees (e.g. calculus, physics, chemistry, biology) and BN curriculums more focused on nursing theory, nursing process, and teaching versions of general science topics that are adapted to be more specific and relevant to nursing practice.Nursing school students are generally required to take courses in social and behavioral sciences and liberal arts, including nutrition, anatomy, chemistry, mathematics, and English. In addition to those courses, experience in physical and social sciences, communication, leadership, and critical thinking is required for a bachelor's degree. BSN programs typically last 2–4 years. Someone who holds a BSN can work in private or public medical and surgical hospitals, physician's offices, home health care services, and nursing facilities. Having a BSN can result in more opportunities and better salary than just an associate degree.

The bachelor's degree prepares nurses for a wide variety of professional roles and graduate study. Course work includes nursing science, research, leadership, and related areas that inform the practice of nursing. It also provides the student with general education in math, humanities and social sciences. An undergraduate degree affords opportunities for greater career advancement and higher salary options. It is often a prerequisite for teaching, administrative, consulting and research roles.

A Bachelor of Science in Nursing is not currently required for entry into professional nursing in all countries. In the US, there has been an effort for it to become the entry-level degree since 1964, when the American Nurses Association (ANA) advanced the position that the minimum preparation for beginning professional nursing practice should be a baccalaureate degree education in nursing. The Institute of Medicine (IOM) affirmed in 2010 that nurses should achieve higher levels of education and training through an improved education system that promotes seamless academic progression.

== In the United States ==
=== Accreditation ===
The Commission on Collegiate Nursing Education (CCNE) and the Accreditation Commission for Education in Nursing (ACEN) are the accreditation bodies for Bachelor of Science in Nursing programs in the United States. Both Commissions are officially recognized as national accreditation agencies that ensure quality standards for undergraduate to graduate nursing programs by the United States Secretary of Education.

=== Accelerated BSN programs ===
Accelerated Bachelor of Science in Nursing programs allow those who already have a bachelor's degree in a non-nursing field to obtain their nursing degree at an accelerated rate, which is why they are also commonly referred to as "Second Degree Nursing Programs." These programs usually have strict prerequisites because the program coursework focuses solely on nursing. Accelerated BSN programs are typically anywhere from 12 to 24 months.

=== BSN Completion or "RN to BSN" Programs ===
These programs are intended specifically for nurses with a diploma or associate degree in nursing who wish to "top-up" their current academic qualifications to a Bachelor of Science in nursing. A majority of these RN to BSN programs are offered online through colleges, universities, or other e-learning providers. In order to keep the programs up-to-date and relevant to the current healthcare system, the course material is updated regularly with feedback from registered nurses, nurse managers, healthcare professionals and even patients.

=== BSN entry level into nursing in the future ===
In 2011, The Institute of Medicine recommended that by 2020, 80 percent of RNs hold a Bachelor of Science in nursing (BSN) degree. This was also noted in a report titled: Institute of Medicine's report on the Future of Nursing, and has been followed by a campaign to implement its recommendations. In this report a 2nd recommendation was made to focus on increasing the proportion of registered nurses (RNs) with a baccalaureate degree to 80% by 2020. Towards that effort the report recommends that educational associations, colleges, delivery organizations, governmental organizations, and funders develop the resources necessary to support this goal. These recommendations are consistent with other policy initiatives currently underway; for example, legislation requiring that nurses receive a baccalaureate degree within 10 years of initial licensure has been considered in New York, New Jersey, and Rhode Island.

Many of these recommendations are being driven by recent studies regarding patient outcomes and nursing education. Hospitals employing higher percentages of BSN-prepared nurses have shown an associated decrease in morbidity, mortality, and failure-to-rescue rates. Increasing the percentage of BSN nurses employed decreases by 10 percent the 30-day inpatient mortality and failure-to-rescue rates. Studies that provide this type of evidence-based practice encompass the ultimate purpose of a higher level of educated nurse workforce. It adds to support the ultimate mission of the Texas Board of Nursing (BON or Board), which is to protect and promote the welfare of the people of Texas by ensuring that each person holding a license as a nurse in this state is competent to practice safely.

Many healthcare leaders and institutions have increased expectations for evidence-based practice (EBP). The Institute of Medicine (IOM) aim was for 90% of clinical decisions to be evidence-based by 2020 (IOM, 2010).

== In China ==
In China, the Bachelor of Science in Nursing (BSN) is a four-year undergraduate degree offered at public medical universities and select general universities. The curriculum combines classroom instruction in nursing theory, anatomy, physiology, and pharmacology with clinical rotations at affiliated teaching hospitals. Upon completion, graduates must pass the National Nursing Licensure Examination administered by the National Medical Examination Center to become a registered nurse.

== See also ==
- Associate of Science in Nursing
- Commission on Collegiate Nursing Education
- Diploma in Nursing
- Doctor of Nursing Practice
- Master of Science in Nursing
- National League for Nursing Accrediting Commission
- Nurse education
- Nursing school
