= Pacific College of Health and Science =

US-based medicine college

Coordinates: 32.7782°N 117.1604°W

- Type: Private for-profit college
- Established: 1986
- Accreditation: WASC; ACAHM; ACEN; AHNCC
- President: Malcolm Youngren
- Faculty: 200 over three campuses
- Administrative staff: 105 over three campuses
- Students: 1,200 average 75% full-time 25% part-time
- Location: San Diego; New York; Chicago
- Colors: Blue and white
- Nicknames: PCHS, Pacific College
- Website: PacificCollege.edu

The Pacific College of Health and Science is a private for-profit institution focused on traditional medicine and integrative health science education. Founded in 1986, it was originally known as Pacific College of Oriental Medicine. The college's main campus is located in New York.

== History ==
The Pacific College of Health and Science was established in 1986 in San Diego, California, following the closure of the California Acupuncture College (CAC). Its founder, Jack Miller, alongside a small group of administrators and faculty, including Joseph Lazzaro, Richard Gold, Ana de Vedia, and Alex Tiberi, sought to continue the mission of teaching traditional oriental medicine (TOM). The college initially offered certificates in TOM and massage therapy.

In 1989, the college hosted the first Pacific Symposium, which later became an annual event focused on education and innovation in TOM. In 1990 it was accredited by California state to offer a master's degree in TOM. In 1993 it opened a campus in New York City's Flatiron District in response to new state regulations governing acupuncture schools. To comply with state naming conventions, the campus was initially called the Pacific Institute of Oriental Medicine but later adopted the Pacific College name. In 2000 it established a third campus in Chicago, Illinois.

In January 2020, the institution rebranded itself as the Pacific College of Health and Science. The new name was an effort to align with broader healthcare fields, such as nursing, and massage therapy education.

== Campuses ==
Pacific College of Health and Science operates three campuses in the United States. The campuses are located in San Diego, California, New York City, New York, and Chicago, Illinois.

=== New York ===
In January 2014, the New York campus relocated to 110 William Street. The facility includes approximately 42,000 square feet of space with additional classrooms, clinic rooms, and faculty areas. The New York campus is situated near Wall Street, Battery Park, and Chinatown. The area includes a mix of residential and commercial populations. The on-site clinic has acupuncture and massage services at reduced rates and has served various local groups, including individuals affected by regional disasters such as the September 11 attacks and Hurricane Sandy. The campus provides academic programs in traditional and integrative medicine.

=== San Diego ===
The San Diego campus of Pacific College of Health and Science is located in the Mission Valley District. The campus occupies approximately 38,000 square feet and includes classrooms, student common areas, group study spaces, and a room designated for meditation and massage practice. It also contains a library with materials related to traditional East Asian medicine, including publications by Ted Kaptchuk. The campus includes a professional clinic with 30 treatment beds and an herbal dispensary. Clinical training is included as part of the program.

=== Chicago ===
In 2025, the Pacific College of Health and Science's Chicago campus relocated to 230 W. Monroe Street, Suite 900, in downtown Chicago. The facility includes classrooms and student areas within a larger office building. The building, part of a multi-tenant office complex, underwent renovations prior to the move.

=== Online ===
Pacific College of Health and Science has an online campus that provides education in holistic and integrative medicine. The curriculum includes Chinese medicine, integrative health, and holistic nursing.

== Accreditation and licensure ==
Pacific College of Health and Science is accredited by several organizations. These include the WASC Senior College and University Commission, the Accreditation Commission for Acupuncture and Herbal Medicine (ACAHM), the Accreditation Commission for Education in Nursing (ACEN), and the American Holistic Nurses Credentialing Corporation (AHNCC). The college is also licensed to grant degrees by the appropriate state authorities.
