= University of Massachusetts (disambiguation) =

University of Massachusetts may refer to:

- University of Massachusetts, a five-campus public university system of the Commonwealth of Massachusetts comprising:
  - University of Massachusetts Amherst, the flagship campus
  - University of Massachusetts Boston
  - University of Massachusetts Dartmouth
  - University of Massachusetts Lowell
  - University of Massachusetts Medical School

Other institutions with similar names may refer to:

- Massachusetts Bay Community College
- Massachusetts College of Art and Design
- Massachusetts College of Liberal Arts
- Massachusetts Maritime Academy

== See also ==
- List of colleges and universities in Massachusetts
