= Bachelor of Fine Arts =

University degree

A Bachelor of Fine Arts (BFA) is a standard undergraduate degree for students pursuing a professional education in the visual arts, fine art, or performing arts. In some instances, it is also called a Bachelor of Visual Arts (BVA).

== Background ==
The Bachelor of Fine Arts degree differs from a Bachelor of Arts (BA) degree in that the program is primarily composed of practical studio work, as opposed to lecture and discussion-based courses.

A Bachelor of Fine Arts degree often requires a specialization in an area such as acting, architecture, musical theatre, game design, animation, ceramics, computer animation, creative writing, dance, dramatic writing, drawing, fashion design, fiber, film production, graphic design, illustration, industrial design, interior design, metalworking, music, new media, painting, photography, printmaking, sculpture, stage management, technical arts, television production, visual arts, or visual effects. Alternatively, some schools provide students with a broad education across many disciplines within the arts.

Although a Bachelor of Fine Arts is traditionally considered a four-year degree, a BFA program may take more or less time to complete depending on the studio coursework required. After completing this degree, graduates may pursue a postgraduate degree: a Master of Fine Arts.

== BFA in countries ==
=== Australia and New Zealand ===
Australia and New Zealand tertiary institutions typically confer BFA degrees after three years of full-time study.

=== United States ===
A typical BFA program in the United States consists of two-thirds study in the arts, with one-third in more general liberal arts studies. In contrast, a BA in Art may reverse this ratio. The National Association of Schools of Art and Design (NASAD), which accredits Bachelor of Fine Arts programs in visual art and design in the United States, states that "the professional degree (BFA) focuses on intensive work in the visual arts supported by a program of general studies," whereas "the liberal arts degree (BA) focuses on art and design in the context of a broad program of general studies."

=== United Kingdom ===
In the United Kingdom, a BA in Fine Arts is equivalent to a BFA. Some performing arts institutions in Australia, New Zealand, the US, and much of Europe use specific degrees such as the Bachelor of Dance or Bachelor of Drama.

=== France ===
In France, the BFA equivalent is the DNA: National Diploma of Art prepared in École des Beaux-Arts. The first year common to all tracks. In the 2nd year, the student chooses a speciality (art, communication or design). The 2nd and 3rd years alternate courses, workshops, seminars and personal projects and the awarded degree is equivalent to a French Licence, or a Bac+3 as France is notorious for counting years of study, +3 meaning 3 years after earning the Baccalauréat.

=== India ===
In India, a Fine Arts undergraduate degree may also be known as BVA (Bachelor of Visual Arts). It is usually a four-year program, with the first year serving as a preparatory session. By the second year, learners specialize in areas such as Painting or Photography. However, some institutions have a three-year curriculum where students have already chosen a specialization. Specializations such as Acting, Dancing, and Singing fall under the Bachelor of Performing Arts (BPA).

At the Jindal School of Liberal Arts and Humanities of O.P. Jindal Global University, the four-year Bachelor of Fine Arts (Honors) program follows this structure: a preparatory first year followed by specialization from the second year onward. For full details on specializations, curriculum, and admissions, see the Bachelor of Fine Arts (Honors) – JSLH.

In some countries, such a degree (BFA) is called a Bachelor of Creative Arts (BCA).

== See also ==
- Fine art
- Master of Fine Arts
- Undergraduate Degree
- Photography
- Visual Arts
- Performing Arts
