= Judith Wold =

American nurse and educator

- Citizenship: American
- Education: Georgia State University; Emory University
- Known for: nursing
- Awards: Georgia Professor of the Year, 2012
- Scientific career
- Fields: Nursing
- Workplaces: Emory University

Judith Wold is an American nurse and educator. She is best known for her work in nursing education as well as global and rural health focusing on vulnerable populations.

== Early life and studies ==
Wold began her career as nurse starting with an associate degree in 1974 and a Bachelors of Science in nursing in 1980, both from Georgia State University. She earned her Masters of Science in nursing in 1981 from Emory University, and completed her PhD in Education Administration in 1993 at Georgia State University.

== Career ==
Wold directs the annual Farm Worker Family Health Program for the Lillian Carter Center for Global Health and Social Responsibility. Working with student nurses and other health science students from five universities in Georgia, the program has delivered health care to more than 10,000 farm workers and their children in Georgia since 1993. In 2012, Wold was named the Georgia Professor of the Year by the Carnegie Foundation and the Council for Advancement and Support of Education.

Wold is the Distinguished Professor for Educational Leadership at the Nell Hodgson Woodruff School of Nursing at Emory University. She is a Fellow of the American Academy of Nursing and a Fellow of the Academy of Nursing Education of the National League for Nursing.
