= Midwest College of Oriental Medicine =

- Type: Private for-profit university
- Total staff: 5
- Students: 47 (Racine; 2023); 39 (Skokie; 2023)
- Location: Racine, Wisconsin; Skokie, Illinois
- Website: www.acupuncture.edu//

Midwest College of Acupuncture and Herbal Medicine is a private for-profit university focused on oriental medicine. With locations in Wisconsin and Illinois, the college offers education and clinical training in acupuncture and Chinese herbal medicine, including tui na, massage, and nutrition.

== History ==
Midwest College of Oriental Medicine was established in Chicago in 1979. The college later expanded to Racine. The college changed its name to Midwest College of Acupuncture and Herbal Medicine.

Midwest College participated in the founding of the Council of Colleges of Acupuncture and Oriental Medicine, one of the parent organizations of the Accreditation Commission for Acupuncture and Herbal Medicine (ACAHM). Since 1996, the school has been formally affiliated with Guangzhou University of Chinese Medicine.

== Academics ==
Midwest College of Acupuncture and Herbal Medicine has been accredited by ACAHM since 1993.

Master's degrees are awarded in Oriental medicine and acupuncture. The Oriental Medicine program takes at least three years to complete; graduates receive a master's degree. The acupuncture program requires a minimum of 2.5 years. In 2003, the school reported that its students had an average age of about 40 and that many had worked in other health-care fields, such as physical therapy or medicine.

Acupuncture and other services are provided through Midwest College clinics; services are free to veterans.

In 2022, 79 percent of all enrolled students at the Racine campus were women. 80 percent of these female students were white; 5 percent of females were Asian and Latino, and 4 percent were Black.
