= Accrediting Commission for Education in Nursing =

The Accreditation Commission for Education in Nursing (ACEN) is one of three program accrediting agencies for nursing education in the US and its territories. It is also a subsidiary of the National League for Nursing. ACEN is recognized by the Council for Higher Education Accreditation (CHEA) for nursing education programs. The non-profit agency is funded by dues from member schools.

ACEN accredits nursing education programs for every level of nursing, from associate level to doctorate. ACEN accreditation is voluntary, but according to the National Council of State Boards of Nursing, ACEN acts as the Title IV "gatekeeper" for nursing education programs. Along with state nursing boards, ACEN determines whether nursing programs can have accreditation and maintain it. Therefore, many nursing programs organize around ACEN standards.

== History ==
In 1893, The American Society of Superintendents of Training Schools for Nurses was founded. The organization's mission was to create a universal standard of nurse training.

In 1938, National League for Nursing Education (NLNE) began accreditation for registered nurse education programs.

Beginning in 1964, federal funding for nursing education under the US Nurse Training Act was contingent upon the compliance of schools of nursing with Title VI of the Civil Rights Act of the same year. In 1997, the Accreditation Commission for Education in Nursing (ACEN) began operations with sole authority for performing the nursing accreditation processes.

Today there are three program accrediting agencies for nursing in the US.

The current CEO for ACEN is Kathy Chappell.

== See also ==
- Commission on Collegiate Nursing Education
- History of nursing in the United States
- List of nursing organizations
- National League for Nursing
- Nursing
