= List of engineering schools in Massachusetts =

This is a list of degree granting engineering schools in Massachusetts, arranged in alphabetical order.

Engineering school	City/town	Engineering fields of study
Boston University	Boston	Aeronautical/aerospace, biomedical, computer, electrical, industrial, mechanical
Benjamin Franklin Cummings Institute of Technology	Boston	Electrical
Bridgewater State University	Bridgewater	Photonics & Optical Engineering
Eastern Nazarene College	Quincy	Computer, electrical, general engineering (co-op with Boston University for mechanical engineering)
Endicott College	Beverly	Biomedical, Engineering
Franklin W. Olin College of Engineering	Needham	Biomedical, computer, electrical, materials, mechanical
Harvard University	Cambridge	Biomedical, computer, electrical, environmental, materials, mechanical
Massachusetts Institute of Technology	Cambridge	Aeronautical/aerospace, biomedical, chemical, civil, computer, electrical, environmental, industrial, ocean, materials, mechanical, nuclear
Massachusetts Maritime Academy	Buzzards Bay	Marine, facilities, energy systems
Northeastern University	Boston	Biomedical, chemical, civil, computer, electrical, environmental, industrial, materials, mechanical
Smith College	Northampton	Engineering
Tufts University	Medford	Biomedical, chemical, civil, computer, electrical, environmental, mechanical
University of Massachusetts Amherst	Amherst	Chemical, civil, computer, electrical, environmental, industrial, mechanical
University of Massachusetts Boston	Boston	Computer, electrical, physics
University of Massachusetts Dartmouth	Dartmouth	Biomedical, civil, computer, electrical, industrial, materials, mechanical
University of Massachusetts Lowell	Lowell	Biomedical, chemical, civil, computer, electrical, energy, mechanical, plastics/polymer
Wentworth Institute of Technology	Boston	interdisciplinary, biological, biomedical, civil, computer, mechanical, electronics, electromechanical
Western New England University	Springfield	Biomedical, civil, computer, electrical, environmental, industrial, mechanical
Worcester Polytechnic Institute	Worcester	Aeronautical/aerospace, architectural, biomedical, chemical, civil, computer, electrical, environmental, industrial, management, materials, mechanical, robotics

== See also ==
- List of colleges and universities in Massachusetts
- List of colleges and universities in metropolitan Boston
- List of systems engineering at universities
