= Conway School of Landscape Design =

Coordinates: 42°30′20.40″N 72°41′40.80″W

- Type: Private
- Established: 1972
- Founders: Walter Cudnohufsky
- Accreditation: NECHE
- Director: Bruce J. Stedman
- Academic staff: 7
- Students: 16
- Location: Northampton, Massachusetts
- Campus: Suburban
- Website: csld.edu

The Conway School (Conway) is a graduate program for sustainable landscape design and planning. It was founded in 1972 in a rural 24.5-acre (99,000 m^{2}) campus in Conway, Massachusetts, and in 2015 opened a new campus in a renovated mill in Easthampton, Massachusetts. In 2018, the school moved to a renovated historic Coach House building in the Village Hill neighborhood of Northampton, Massachusetts. The graduate school offers a unique Master of Science degree in Ecological Design. The school accepts about twenty students each year into its 10-month program.

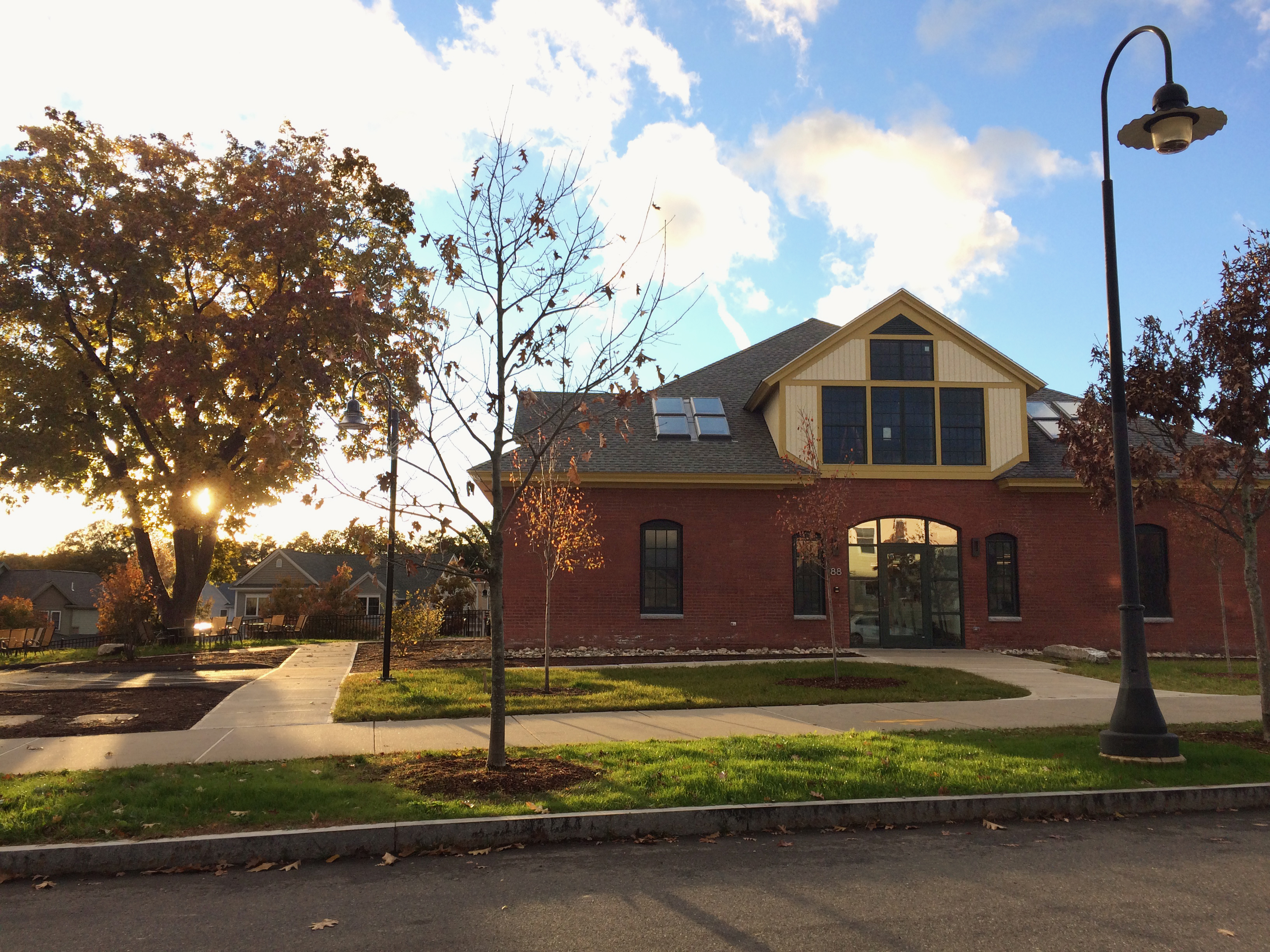
The Conway School's new home is the first floor of a renovated 1900s-era brick coach house in Northampton, Massachusetts.

The mission of the Conway School is to explore, develop, practice, and teach design that is ecologically and socially sustainable. The program puts particular emphasis on communication skills and community building. Students work on real projects with real clients at varying scales, from residential landscaping to urban planning and management of entire watersheds and food system.

Conway's founder, landscape architect and planner Walter Cudnohofsky, served as director from 1972 to 1992.
