= American Association of Nurse Anesthesiology =

Professional association of American nurse anesthetists

American Association of Nurse Anesthetists
- Formation: June 17, 1931; 95 years ago
- Type: Professional association
- Legal status: 501(c)(6)
- Headquarters: Rosemont, Illinois, U.S.
- Members: 62000
- President: Jeff Molter MBA, MSN, CRNA
- CEO: William "Bill" Bruce MBA, CAE
- Website: www.aana.com

The American Association of Nurse Anesthesiology (AANA), previously named the American Association of Nurse Anesthetists, is a professional association for nurse anesthetists in the United States. The name change in no way implies that CRNA are medical doctors or anesthesiologists. CRNAs did not attend medical doctor school and are not physician anesthesiologists. The organization states that it has a membership of more than 62,000 and represents approximately 90% of CRNAs in the United States. The AANA headquarters is currently located in Rosemont, Illinois, a suburb of Chicago.

== History ==
On June 17, 1931, 48 nurse anesthetists, led by Agatha Hodgins, met in a classroom at the University Hospital of Cleveland Lakeside in Cleveland, Ohio. During this meeting, they founded the National Association of Nurse Anesthetists (NANA). The association held its first annual meeting in Milwaukee, Wisconsin, from September 13 to 15, 1933. The meeting drew 120 attendees and saw Agatha Hodgins elected as the inaugural president. As a new organization, it had two main objectives: establish a national qualifying exam, and establish an accreditation program for nurse anesthetist schools. The first national certification exam was held in June 1945, with 90 candidates sitting for the exam.

The AANA began accrediting nurse anesthetist programs in 1952 and was recognized as an accrediting body by the U.S. Department of Education in 1955. In 1975, the accreditation of nurse anesthesia educational programs transitioned from the AANA to the autonomous Council on Accreditation of Nurse Anesthesia Educational Programs (COA).

== Name change ==
In August 2021, the organization changed its name from "American Association of Nurse Anesthetists" to "American Association of Nurse Anesthesiology" as part of a rebranding effort. This name change, along with the organization's endorsement of the descriptor "nurse anesthesiologist", was subsequently condemned by many physicians' groups, including the American Medical Association (AMA), American Society of Anesthesiologists (ASA), American Board of Medical Specialties, American Osteopathic Association, American Board of Anesthesiology, and American Osteopathic Board of Anesthesiology. These organizations state that the name change is misappropriating the anesthesiologist title, and that it is deceptive, misleading to patients, and causes confusion in care settings.

== Journal of the American Association of Nurse Anesthesiology ==
The Journal of the American Association of Nurse Anesthesiology (AANA Journal) is a peer-reviewed, bimonthly academic journal serving as the official publication of the American Association of Nurse Anesthesiology. First published in 1933, it focuses on disseminating scholarly articles relevant to the practice of nurse anesthesiology.
