= Accreditation Commission for Acupuncture and Herbal Medicine =

- Abbreviation: ACAHM
- Purpose: acupuncture oriental medicine
- Location: United States
- Website: www.acahm.org
- Formerly called: Accreditation Commission for Acupuncture and Oriental Medicine

The Accreditation Commission for Acupuncture and Herbal Medicine (ACAHM) is a specialized accreditation agency recognized by the United States Department of Education. ACAHM is a 501(c)(3) not-for-profit corporation, incorporated in the District of Columbia with a corporate office in Eden Prairie, Minnesota. National, regional, and specialized accreditors are reviewed by the USDE to ensure that the accrediting body meets specific standards established by the United States Congress. The Secretary of Education is charged with review of accrediting bodies and providing recognition to those accrediting agencies that meet the Secretary of Education's criteria. ACAHM's scope of recognition from the USDE is "the accreditation and pre-accreditation ("candidacy") throughout the United States of professional non-degree and graduate degree programs, including professional doctoral programs, in the field of acupuncture and/or Oriental medicine, as well as freestanding institutions and colleges of acupuncture and/or Oriental medicine that offer such programs".

In 2021, the organization changed its name from the Accreditation Commission for Acupuncture and Oriental Medicine to the Accreditation Commission for Acupuncture and Herbal Medicine.

== Accredited programs and institutions ==
Over 50 post-secondary institutions with over 120 programs hold accredited or pre-accredited status with ACAHM.
