= Commission on English Language Program Accreditation =

- Abbreviation: CEA
- Formation: 1999
- Type: Non-profit NGO
- Purpose: Educational Accreditation
- Headquarters: Alexandria, Virginia, United States
- Website: www.cea-accredit.org

The Commission on English Language Program Accreditation (CEA) is a specialized accrediting agency that accredits post-secondary English language training programs. CEA states that its purpose is to provide a systematic approach by which programs and institutions can demonstrate their compliance with accepted standards, pursue continuous improvement, and be recognized for doing so. CEA accredits intensive English programs and institutions in the U.S. and internationally.

CEA accredits over 330 programs and institutions.

== History ==
CEA was founded in 1999 by English language teaching and administration professionals, following a recommendation by a TESOL task force composed of appointees from TESOL, NAFSA, UCIEP, and AAIEP (now EnglishUSA). TESOL provided early operational and financial support for CEA, after which CEA was incorporated as a separate and independent non-profit accreditation agency in 1999.

In 2003, CEA was recognized by the U.S. Secretary of Education as a national accrediting agency for English language programs and institutions. CEA continues to be the only specialized accrediting agency for English language programs and institutions in the U.S. that is recognized by the U.S. Department of Education. In 2005, the mission of CEA was expanded to include the accreditation of post-secondary English language programs and schools outside the U.S. In 2013, federal legislation (P.L. 111-306) requiring that all English language programs seeking to issue student visas to non-immigrant international students for full-time intensive English study be accredited by a USDE-recognized accreditor took effect.

== Mission and Values ==
"The mission of the Commission on English Language Program Accreditation is to protect the interests of students and promote excellence in the field of English language teaching and administration through accreditation of English language programs and institutions worldwide. CEA achieves its mission by advancing widely-held standards to foster student success and continuous program development through a rigorous process of regular self-assessment and peer evaluation."

CEA operates in keeping with the published CEA Values.

== Standards ==
The CEA Standards focus on the overall quality of an English language program or institution and are the basis of all accreditation decisions. A program or institution seeking accreditation must respond to each standard and document its compliance with the standard. The CEA Standards are divided into 11 standard areas: Mission, Program Development/Planning/Review, Curriculum, Faculty, Facilities/Equipment/Supplies, Administrative and Fiscal Capacity, Student Services, Recruiting, Length and Structure of the Program of Study, Student Achievement, and Student Complaints.

== Organizational structure ==
=== Commission and Commissioners ===
CEA is governed by a commission of thirteen unpaid elected and appointed members. Eleven of the Commissioners are representatives from the field of teaching English to speakers of other languages at the post-secondary level and the remaining two Commissioners are public members who are outside the field of English language teaching and appointed to their positions. The eleven Commissioners from the field represent a range of program and institutional perspectives and domains of academic and administrative experience. Commissioners serve for a three-year term. Commissioners are elected by the CEA Constituent Council, which comprises representatives of CEA-accredited programs and institutions.

The Commission is responsible for setting CEA policy, for making accreditation decisions, and for fostering the continued development of CEA so that it can continue to respond to the changing needs in the field of English language teaching and administration. Five standing committees conduct relevant activities: Executive Committee, Finance Committee, Nominating Committee, Standards Compliance Committee, Standards Review Committee.

=== Constituent Council ===
Accredited programs and institutions are considered constituents of CEA, and as such, become a member of the CEA Constituent Council. Members of the Constituent Council nominate candidates employed by an accredited program or institution to stand for election to serve on the Commission; elect the eleven non-public members of the Commission and make recommendations to the Commission regarding revisions to the CEA Standards and CEA Policies and Procedures.

=== CEA Administration ===
CEA staff includes executive, accreditation process, accreditation review, compliance, and business operations units. The executive director is the chief executive officer of CEA, appointed by the Commission, and responsible for the overall management of CEA’s operations. In concert with the Commission, the executive director is responsible for implementing CEA’s policies, programs, services and decisions.

=== Site Reviewers ===
CEA site reviews are conducted by peer reviewers who are selected and trained by CEA. Reviewer qualifications include academic requirements and evidence of professional engagement, relevant domains of expertise, experience with self-study or program evaluation, skill in written and oral communication. Reviewers must adhere to strict confidentiality and conflict-of-interest requirements.

== Relationship to the US government ==
=== U.S. Department of Education recognition ===
Following review by the U.S. Department of Education, CEA was granted recognition by the U.S. Secretary of Education in 2003 and has maintained recognition through regular renewal reviews. This recognition verifies that CEA complies with the Department’s criteria for recognition, which are the requirements stated in federal regulations CFR 34 Part 602. CEA is recognized by the Secretary to accredit both programs and language institutions; however, the Secretary's recognition of CEA does not qualify its accredited institutions for student financial aid under the Higher Education Act. A description of the recognition process and a list of recognized accreditation agencies is available at www.ed.gov/accreditation.

=== U.S. Department of Homeland Security, the Student and Exchange Visitor Program (SEVP), and the Accreditation Act ===
Intensive English language programs and institutions within the United States that admit international students for study must be certified by the Student and Exchange Visitor Program (SEVP) division within the Department of Homeland Security (DHS) division in order to issue the document (Form I-20) to such students to allow them to apply for student visas to enter the U.S.

In 2010, P.L. 111-306 was enacted; this legislation, also known as the Accreditation Act, requires that English language schools that seek SEVP certification to issue Form I-20 be accredited by an accreditor recognized by the U.S. Secretary of Education. Thus, one purpose of CEA accreditation is to provide programs and institutions a means to show that they meet the requirements of the Accreditation Act and provide SEVP with a means of identifying sites that comply with the Act.

== See also ==
=== Accreditation Process ===
CEA’s accreditation process comprises an eligibility application, workshop, self-study report, site visit, and accreditation decision.
