= National Association of Schools of Music =

Association of post-secondary music schools in the United States

The National Association of Schools of Music (NASM) is an association of post-secondary music schools in the United States and the principal U.S. accreditor for higher education in music. It was founded on October 20, 1924, and it began accrediting schools in 1939. It is based in Reston, Virginia.

== Accreditation ==
NASM is recognized by the Council for Higher Education Accreditation as a programmatic accreditation organization for institutions offering degree and non-degree educational programs in music and music-related disciplines. It currently has approximately 625 accredited institutional members, including specialty schools of music, conservatories, and universities offering music programs.

== History ==
On June 10, 1924, leaders from six music schools met to organize the inaugural convention of the "National Association of Schools of Music and Allied Arts", which was held on October 20, 1924 in Pittsburgh. The six founding schools were:

1. Burnet Corwin Tuthill (1888–1982), Cincinnati Conservatory of Music
2. John James Hattstaedt (1851–1931), American Conservatory of Music (1886–1991)
3. Kenneth McPherson Bradley (1872–1954), Bush Conservatory of Music, which merged in 1932 with The Chicago Conservatory College under duress of the Great Depression
4. Arthur Wright Mason (1866–1955), Louisville Conservatory of Music, which merged in 1932 with the University of Louisville under duress of the Great Depression
5. Charles Newell Boyd (1875–1937), Pittsburgh Musical Institute, which merged in 1963 with the University of Pittsburgh
6. Edwin John Stringham (1890–1974), Wolcott Conservatory of Music, founded in 1920 and in 1925 was reorganized and renamed as the Denver College of Music

The attendees at the first NASM Convention of October 20, 1924, decided to officially form the "National Association of Schools of Music and Allied Arts." The accreditation aspect of NASM, though, did not launch until about 1929. The charter members currently in existence are:

- The Music Conservatory of Chicago College of Performing Arts
- Cleveland Institute of Music
- Converse College, Spartanburg, South Carolina
- Eastman School of Music, University of Rochester
- New England Conservatory of Music, Boston
- Northwestern University, Evanston, Illinois
- Oberlin College
- Syracuse University
- University of Cincinnati
- University of Iowa, Iowa City
- University of Kansas, Lawrence
- University of Michigan
- University of Nebraska–Lincoln, Lincoln
- University of Oregon
- University of the Pacific, Stockton, California
- University of Southern California
- Wisconsin Conservatory of Music, Milwaukee
- Yale University

NASM's founding officers were Kenneth M. Bradley, President; Burnet C. Tuthill, Secretary; and Charles N. Boyd, Treasurer.

== Current and past presidents ==
- 1924–1928 — Kenneth McPherson Bradley (1872–1954), Bush Conservatory of Music
- 1928–1931 — Harold Lancaster Butler (1874–1957), Syracuse University, University of Kansas
- 1932–1935 — Earl Vincent Moore (1890–1987), University of Michigan
- 1935–1944 — Howard Harold Hanson (1896–1981), Eastman School of Music
- 1944–1948 — Donald Malcolm Swarthout (1894–1962), University of Kansas
- 1948–1952 — Price Asher Doyle (1896–1967), Murray State University
- 1953–1962 — Thomas Artur Gorton (1910–1997), University of Kansas (served 4 terms as president)
- 1955–1958 — Erza William Doty (1907–1994), University of Texas at Austin
- 1962–19?? — Charles Brownlow Hunt, Jr. (1916–2002), Peabody College
- 1968 — Robert Hargreaves (1914–2000), Ball State University
- 1971–1972 — Carl Melvin Neumeyer (1911–1972), Illinois Wesleyan University
- 1976–1978 — Warner Imig (1910–2005), University of Colorado at Boulder
- 1979–1982 — Robert Earl Bays (1921–2015), University of Illinois Urbana-Champaign
- 1983–1985 — Thomas W. Miller (1930–2018), Northwestern University
- 1986–1988 — Robert Burr Glidden (born 1936), Florida State University
- 1989–1991 — Robert J. Werner (1932–2022), University of Cincinnati – College-Conservatory of Music
- 1992–1994 — Fred Miller (1930–2006), DePaul University
- 1995–1997 — Harold M. Best (born 1931), Wheaton College, Illinois
- 1998–2000 — J. William Hipp (born 1934), University of Miami School of Music
- 2001–2003 — David J. Tomatz (1935–2014), University of Houston
- 2004–2006 — Karen Lias Wolff (born 1937), University of Michigan, Oberlin Conservatory of Music
- 2007–2009 — Daniel Sher (born 1943), University of Colorado at Boulder
- 2010–2012 — Donald Gibson (born 1948), Florida State University
- 2013–2015 — Mark Wait (born 1947), Vanderbilt University
- 2016–2018 — Sue Haug (born 1947), Pennsylvania State University
- 2025–2027 — Tayloe Harding (born 1959), University of South Carolina
- 2027– (President-Elect) James Forger (born 1951), Michigan State University

== See also ==
- List of recognized accreditation associations of higher learning
- United States Department of Education
- European Association of Conservatoires (AEC)
- National Association for Music in Higher Education, United Kingdom of Great Britain and Northern Ireland
