= Council on Education for Public Health =

United States accrediting body for public health programs

The Council on Education for Public Health (CEPH) is an independent agency recognized by the U.S. Department of Education to accredit schools of public health and public health programs offered in settings other than schools of public health. The council's headquarters are in Silver Spring, Maryland. These schools and programs prepare students for entry into careers in public health. The primary professional degree is the Master of Public Health (M.P.H.), but other master's and doctoral degrees are also offered, such as the Doctor of Public Health (DrPH).

The Council is a private, nonprofit corporation directed by a 10-member board. As an independent body, the board is solely responsible for adopting criteria by which schools and programs are evaluated, for establishing policies and procedures, for making accreditation decisions and for managing the business of the corporation.
