= National Association of Schools of Art and Design =

US organisation for accreditation of schools, colleges and universities

The National Association of Schools of Art and Design (NASAD), founded in 1944, is an accrediting organization of colleges, schools and universities in the United States. The organization establishes standards for graduate and undergraduate degrees. Member institutions complete periodic peer review processes to become, and remain, accredited. NASAD accreditation should not be confused with regional accreditation. While the association works with other professional organizations, including the AIGA, the American Craft Council, and the Association of Independent Colleges of Art and Design, NASAD remains the only accrediting agency for higher education art and design programs in the United States that is recognized by the U.S. Department of Education.

== Standards for accreditation ==
The National Association for Schools of Art and Design has stringent criteria for accrediting schools. For example, the NASAD requires that schools clearly publish their tuition rates and course descriptions. In addition, board members assess the schools' art curricula and promote new standards to advance art education.

== History ==
Richard F. Bach, Dean of Education at the Metropolitan Museum of Art, played a pivotal role in founding the association in 1944. That year, he convened representatives from leading art and design institutions at the museum to discuss the emerging field of industrial design. This initial "conference of schools of design" garnered enthusiastic support and led to regular meetings. By 1948, these gatherings had evolved into a formal organization called the National Association of Schools of Design.

Prior to World War II, the number of art and design schools that offered four-year degrees was few. Among the association's 22 charter members, some were on the cusp of doing so, but less than half offered comprehensive art education programs at the time: Those private schools offering four-year fine art degrees included the Carnegie Institute of Technology, Maryland Institute, Moore Institute of Art, Rhode Island School of Design, and Syracuse University. And among the public institutions that helped found the association, only Auburn University and University of Illinois (Urbana) had been offering four-year fine art degrees before WWII and the initial conference which became NASAD.

The name was changed to the National Association of Schools of Art and Design in 1981 to more accurately reflect its broadening scope and interests. Over the better half of a century, its membership has expanded to over 300 institutions from all regions of the United States. This growth has strengthened NASAD's role in developing and upholding educational standards in art and design, fostering mutual understanding and respect among schools and departments nationwide.

== See also ==
- Council on Higher Education Accreditation
- Higher education accreditation in the United States
- List of recognized accreditation associations of higher learning
- School accreditation
- US Department of Education
