= Commission on Collegiate Nursing Education =

US nursing education accrediting agency

- Abbreviation: CCNE
- Purpose: nursing education accreditation
- Headquarters: 655 K Street, NW, Suite 750, Washington, D.C., U.S.
- Location: United States

The Commission on Collegiate Nursing Education (CCNE) is a nursing education accrediting agency in the United States. The CCNE is recognized by the U.S. Department of Education. The commission's headquarters are in Washington, D.C.

CCNE accreditation is a voluntary, self-regulatory process, and the organization encourages and supports nursing education programs to perform self-assessments to grow and improve their collegiate professional education.

In 1996, the American Association of Colleges of Nursing (AACN), as the national advocacy organization for America's baccalaureate and higher-degree nursing education programs, created the autonomous accrediting arm of the organization, the Commission on Collegiate Nursing Education (CCNE).

The CCNE is the only nursing education accrediting agency dedicated exclusively to the accreditation of bachelor's and graduate-degree nursing education programs.

The AACN represents more than 592 schools of nursing at public and private universities and senior colleges nationwide, and which offer a variety of baccalaureate, graduate, and post-graduate programs.
