= National League for Nursing =

American organization for faculty nurses and leaders

- Abbreviation: NLN
- Formation: 1893
- Headquarters: 2600 Virginia Avenue, NW; Suite 800; Washington, D.C. 20037, United States
- Members: 45,000 individual and 1,000 institutional members
- President: G. Rumay Alexander, EdD, RN, FAAN
- CEO: Beverly Malone, PhD, RN, FAAN
- Website: nln.org

The National League for Nursing (NLN) is an American national organization for faculty nurses and leaders in nurse education. It offers faculty development, networking opportunities, testing services, nursing research grants, and public policy initiatives to more than 45,000 individual and 1,000 education and associate members.

== Mission ==
The National League for Nursing states that its mission is to promote excellence in nursing education in order to build a diverse nursing workforce and advance health in the United States and globally.

== History ==
The NLN was founded in 1893 as the American Society of Superintendents of Training Schools for Nurses and was the first organization for nursing in the U.S.

In 1912, it was renamed the National League for Nursing Education (NLNE) and released the first Standard Curriculum for Schools of Nursing in 1917.

In 1942, the NLNE created individual membership, enabling African-American nurses to participate in the organization. In 1952, the NLNE combined with the National Organization for Public Health Nursing and the Association for Collegiate Schools of Nursing as the National League for Nursing, and the United States Department of Education (USDE) recognized the NLN, including it on the initial list of recognized accrediting agencies. This allowed the NLN to assume responsibility for the accreditation of nursing schools in the U.S.

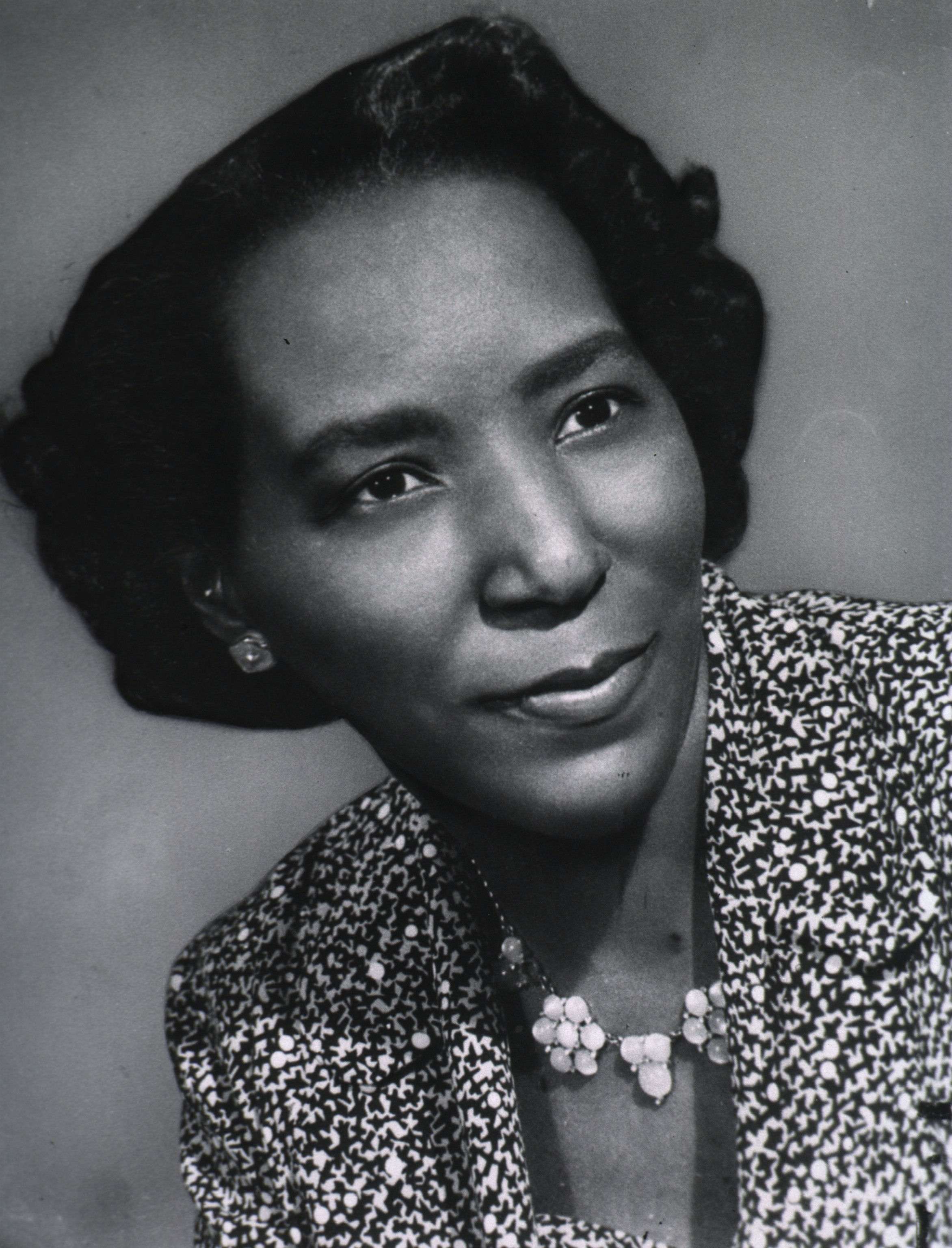
Willie Mae Jackson Jones

At this time, the NLN included African-American nurses in positions, including the board of directors. Willie Mae Jackson Jones, of the Community Nursing Services of Montclair, New Jersey, served as the first African-American in the organization, as a member of the first NLN board of directors. Additionally, Dr. Lillian Holland Harvey, the Dean of the Tuskegee Institute School of Nursing, was also on the board of directors.

== Awards ==
NLN presents a number of awards every year. Among the major awards given are the Mary Adelaide Nutting Award for Outstanding Teaching or Leadership in Nursing Education, the Isabel Hampton Robb Award for Outstanding Leadership in Clinical Practice, and the Lillian Wald Humanitarian Award.

== Accrediting Commission ==
In 1996, the NLN Board of Governors approved establishment of an independent entity within the organization to be known as the National League for Nursing Accrediting Commission (NLNAC). In 1997, the NLNAC began operations with sole authority and accountability for carrying out the responsibilities inherent to the accreditation processes. Fifteen Commissioners were appointed: nine nurse educators, three nursing service representatives, and three public members. The Commissioners assumed responsibilities for the management, financial decisions, policy-making, and general administration of the NLNAC.

The NLNAC was incorporated as a subsidiary of the NLN in 2001, and twelve years later, the name of the NLNAC was changed to the Accreditation Commission for Education in Nursing (ACEN), the name under which the subsidiary continues to operate. On December 1, 2014, Marsal P. Stoll, EdD, MSN, was appointed the chief executive officer of the ACEN.

In 2014, the NLN created an additional commission for nursing education accreditation, the Commission for Nursing Education Accreditation (CNEA). On July 1, 2014, Judith A. Halstead, PhD, RN, FAAN, ANEF, was appointed executive director of the CNEA.

Both organizations operate to support the interests of nursing education through accreditation. A core difference is that the ACEN is recognized by the USDE. This recognition includes the ACEN being recognized by the USDE as an "institutional" accreditation agency, and as such the nursing program offered by the "institution" can be eligible for Higher Education Reauthorization Act, Title IV funds through the ACEN.

A collection of papers including proceedings of annual conventions, meeting minutes, biographical data of early leaders, correspondence, and photos are held at the National Library of Medicine in Bethesda, Maryland.

Accredited Programs

The number of accredited programs awarding academic degrees, diplomas or certificates by the NLNAC as of 2010:

- Clinical Doctorate — 2
- Nursing Doctorate — 1
- Master of Nursing — 197
- Baccalaureate — 234
- Associate — 673
- Diploma — 53
- Practical Nursing — 162

== Testing ==
The NLN provides the Total Assessment Program (TAP) for NCLEX Success, which is a comprehensive testing services program for nurse educators, students, and practitioners. TAP is a complete preparation package to assess students' abilities and achievement prior to admission, after specific courses, and at the completion of nursing programs. The TAP package consists of Pre-Admission Exams; Achievement Exams, including Practice Tests and Remediation; Pre-NCLEX Readiness Exams; Live Review; and Question Review Bank (QRB).

== See also ==
- List of nursing organizations
- Lucile Petry Leone
- Katharine Jane Densford
- Anna L. Alline
