= List of colleges and universities in West Virginia =

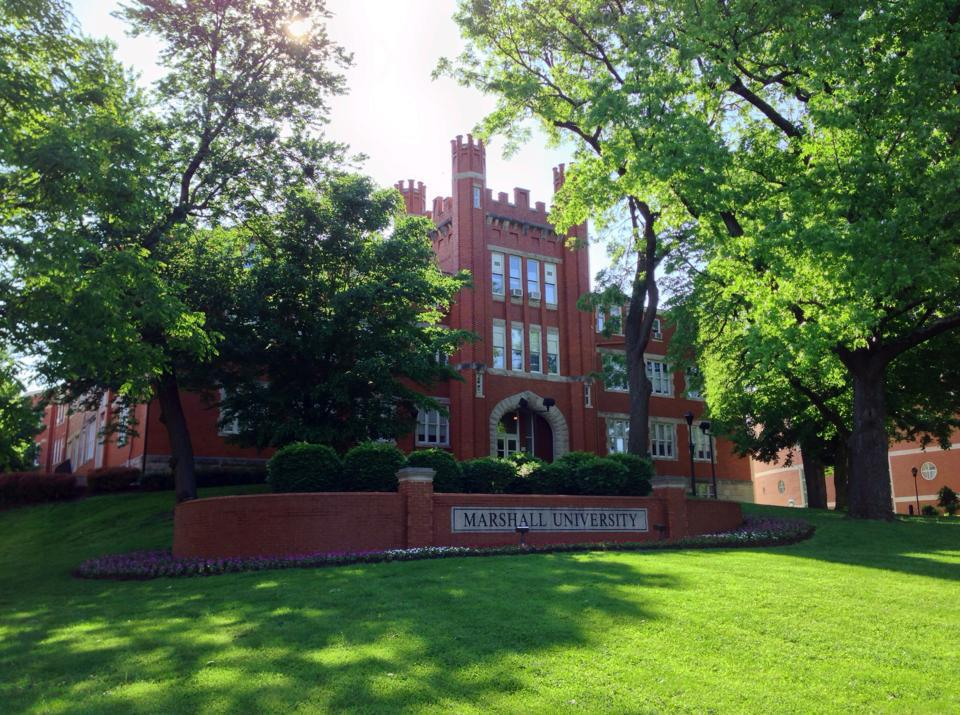
Old Main at Marshall University

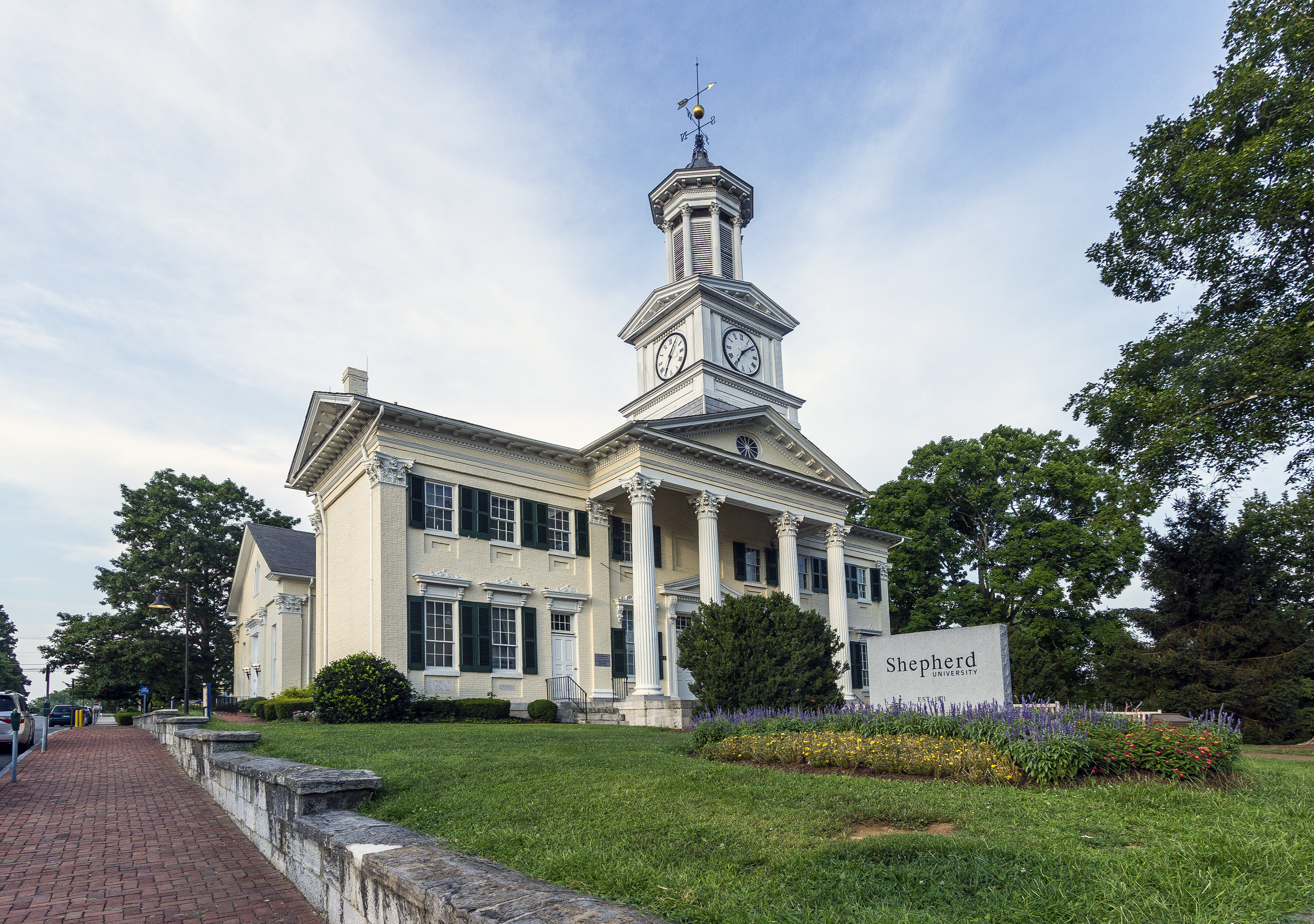
McMurran Hall at Shepherd University

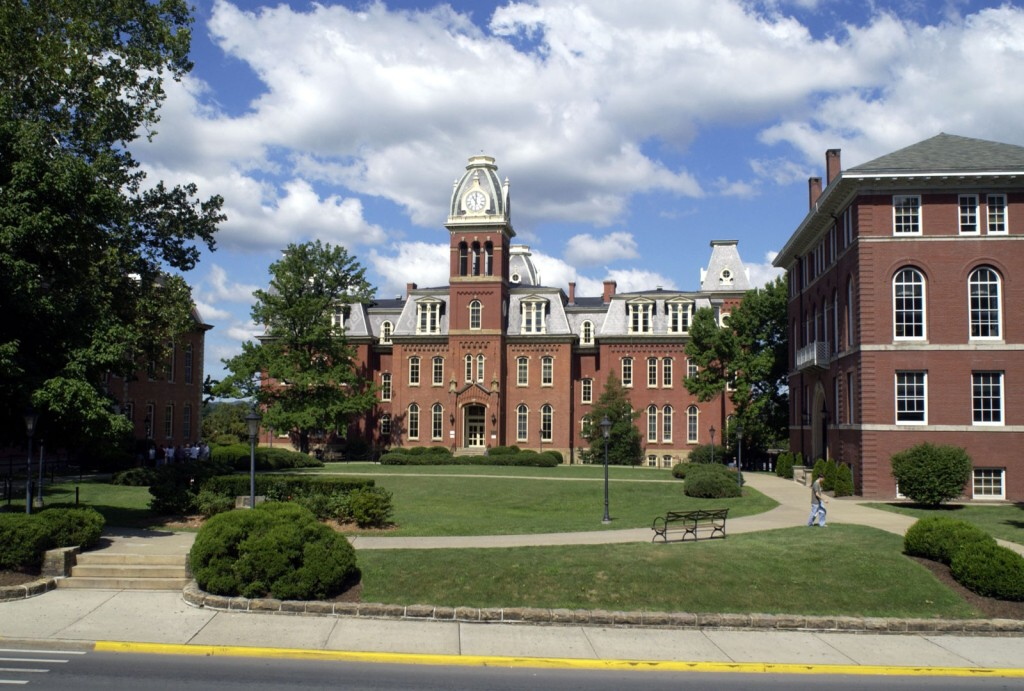
Woodburn Hall at West Virginia University

There are thirty-seven colleges and universities in the U.S. state of West Virginia that are listed under the Carnegie Classification of Institutions of Higher Education. These institutions include two research universities, five master's universities, and fourteen baccalaureate colleges, as well as twenty-one associate's colleges. In addition, there are three institutions classified as special-focus institutions.

West Virginia's oldest surviving post-secondary institution is Bethany College, founded on March 2, 1840, by Alexander Campbell. Marshall University and West Liberty University were both established in 1837, but as private subscription schools. Founded in 1867, West Virginia University is the state's largest public institution of higher learning in terms of enrollment, as it had 23,643 students as of fall 2024. Eastern West Virginia Community and Technical College is the state's smallest, with an enrollment of 465. With an enrollment of 3,062 students, the University of Charleston is West Virginia's largest traditional private post-secondary institution, while Future Generations University is the state's smallest, with an enrollment of 48. The American Public University System, a private for-profit, distance education institution based in Charles Town, has the largest enrollment of any post-secondary institution in West Virginia, with 50,715 students. Catholic Distance University, a fully online non-profit university in Charles Town, educates undergraduate students in Liberal Arts and theology and graduate students in theology and educational ministry.

West Virginia has two land-grant universities: West Virginia State University and West Virginia University. West Virginia University is also the state's sole participant university in the National Space Grant College and Fellowship Program. In addition, West Virginia has two historically black colleges and universities that are members of the Thurgood Marshall College Fund: Bluefield State University and West Virginia State University.

West Virginia has three medical schools: Marshall University Joan C. Edwards School of Medicine, West Virginia School of Osteopathic Medicine, and West Virginia University School of Medicine. It has one law school, West Virginia University College of Law, which is accredited by the American Bar Association. The majority (thirty-two) of West Virginia's post-secondary institutions are accredited by the Higher Learning Commission (HLC). Most are accredited by multiple agencies or have specific programs or units accredited by agency, including by the Accreditation Commission for Education in Nursing (ACEN), the American Physical Therapy Association (APTA), the Commission on Collegiate Nursing Education (CCNE), and the Council for the Accreditation of Educator Preparation (CAEP).

== Institutions ==
School	Location (Note: School location is based on the Carnegie Classification of Institutions of Higher Education.)	Control (Note: School control is based on the Carnegie Classification of Institutions of Higher Education.)	Type (Note: School types are based on the Carnegie Classification of Institutions of Higher Education.)	Enrollment (Fall 2024)	Founded	Accreditation
American Public University System	Charles Town	Private for-profit	Master's university	50,715	1991	CCNE, CEPH, HLC
Appalachian Bible College	Mount Hope	Private not-for-profit	Special-focus institution	223	1950	ABHE, HLC
Bethany College	Bethany	Private not-for-profit	Baccalaureate college	640	1840	HLC
Blue Ridge Community and Technical College	Martinsburg	Public	Associate's college	4,203	1974	ACEN, APTA, HLC
Bluefield State University	Bluefield	Public	Baccalaureate college	1,141	1895	ACEN, CCNE, JRCERT, HLC
BridgeValley Community and Technical College	South Charleston and Montgomery	Public	Associate's college	1,927	1953	ACEN, HLC
Catholic International University	Charles Town	Private not-for-profit	Master's university	230	1983	DEAC, HLC, ATS
University of Charleston	Charleston	Private not-for-profit	Doctoral/Professional university	3,062	1888	ACEN, ACPE, AOTA, JRCERT, HLC
Concord University	Athens	Public	Master's university	1,943	1872	CCNE, HLC
Davis & Elkins College	Elkins	Private not-for-profit	Baccalaureate college	661	1904	ACEN, CNEA, HLC
Eastern West Virginia Community and Technical College	Moorefield	Public	Associate's college	465	1999	ACEN, HLC
Fairmont State University	Fairmont	Public	Master's university	3,305	1865	ACEN, CCNE, HLC
Future Generations University	Franklin	Private not-for-profit	Special focus institution	48	2003	HLC
Glenville State University	Glenville	Public	Baccalaureate college	1,765	1872	HLC
Huntington Junior College	Huntington	Private for-profit	Special focus institution	182	1936	HLC
Marshall University	Huntington	Public	Research university	11,958	1837	ACEN, AND, APTA, APA, ASHA, CEPH, LCME, NASM, HLC
Mountwest Community and Technical College	Huntington	Public	Associate's college	1,520	1975	APTA, HLC
New River Community and Technical College	Beckley	Public	Associate's college	1,571	2003	ACEN, APTA, HLC
Pierpont Community and Technical College	Fairmont	Public	Associate's college	1,938	1974	AND, APTA, HLC
Potomac State College of West Virginia University	Keyser	Public	Associate's college	1,077	1901	HLC
Salem University	Salem	Private for-profit	Master's university	1,083	1888	CNEA, HLC
Shepherd University	Shepherdstown	Public	Master's university	3,339	1871	ACEN, AND, CCNE, NASM, HLC
Southern West Virginia Community and Technical College	Mount Gay	Public	Associate's college	1,482	1971	ACEN, ADA, JRCERT, HLC
Valley College	Beckley and Martinsburg	Private for-profit	Associate's college	930	1983	ACEN, ACCSC
West Liberty University	West Liberty	Public	Master's university	2,299	1837	ACEN, ADA, ASHA, CCNE, NASM, HLC
West Virginia Junior College–Bridgeport	Bridgeport	Private for-profit	Special focus institution	146	1922	ACEN, ABHES
West Virginia Junior College–Charleston	Cross Lanes	Private for-profit	Associate's college	394	1892	ACEN, ABHES
West Virginia Junior College–Morgantown	Morgantown	Private for-profit	Associate's college	673	1922	ACEN, ABHES
West Virginia Northern Community College	Wheeling	Public	Associate's college	1,525	1972	ACEN, JRCERT, HLC
West Virginia School of Osteopathic Medicine	Lewisburg	Public	Special-focus institution	835	1972	AOA, HLC
West Virginia State University	Institute	Public	Master's university	3,246	1891	CCNE, HLC
West Virginia University	Morgantown	Public	Research university	23,643	1867	ACPE, ABA, ADA, AND, AOTA, APTA, APA, ASHA, CCNE, CEA, CEPH, COA, LCME, NASAD, NASM, NAST, HLC
West Virginia University at Parkersburg	Parkersburg	Public	Baccalaureate college	2,728	1961	ACEN, HLC
West Virginia University Institute of Technology	Beckley	Public	Baccalaureate college	1,278	1895	HLC
West Virginia Wesleyan College	Buckhannon	Private not-for-profit	Baccalaureate college	1,055	1890	ACEN, CCNE, HLC
Wheeling University	Wheeling	Private not-for-profit	Master's university	774	1954	APTA, CCNE, HLC

Key
Abbreviation	Accrediting agency
ABA	American Bar Association
ABHES	Accrediting Bureau of Health Education Schools
ACEN	Accreditation Commission for Education in Nursing
ACCSC	Accrediting Commission of Career Schools and Colleges
ADA	American Dietetic Association
AOA	American Osteopathic Association
ACICS	Accrediting Council for Independent Colleges and Schools
ACPE	Accreditation Council for Pharmacy Education
ADA	American Dental Association
AND	Academy of Nutrition and Dietetics
AOTA	American Occupational Therapy Association
APTA	American Physical Therapy Association
APA	American Psychological Association
ASHA	American Speech–Language–Hearing Association
ABHE	Association for Biblical Higher Education
CCNE	Commission on Collegiate Nursing Education
CEA	Commission on English Language Program Accreditation
CEPH	Council on Education for Public Health
CNEA	Commission for Nurse Education Accreditation
COA	Council on Accreditation of Nurse Anesthesia Educational Programs
JRCERT	Joint Review Committee on Education in Radiologic Technology
LCME	Liaison Committee on Medical Education
NASAD	National Association of Schools of Art and Design
NASM	National Association of Schools of Music
NAST	National Association of Schools of Theatre
HLC	Higher Learning Commission
NCATE	National Council for Accreditation of Teacher Education
TEAC	Teacher Education Accreditation Council

== Defunct institutions ==
School	Location	Control	Founded	Closed	Ref(s)
Alderson Broaddus University	Philippi	Private not-for-profit	1871 (Note: Alderson Academy and Junior College and Broaddus University merged to form Alderson Broaddus University in 1932. Broaddus University, the older of the two institutions, was established in Winchester, Virginia in 1871, and relocated to Clarksburg in 1876, and finally moved to Philippi in 1901. Alderson Academy and Junior College was founded in Alderson in 1901.)	2023	
Everest Institute–Cross Lanes	Cross Lanes	Private for-profit	1968	2014	
Greenbrier College	Lewisburg	Private	1812	1972	
Greenbrier Military School	Lewisburg	Private	1812	1972	
Mountain State University	Beckley	Private not-for-profit	1933	2013	
Ohio Valley University	Vienna	Private not-for-profit	1958	2021	
Rector College	Pruntytown	Church affiliated, not-for-profit	1839	1855	
Storer College	Harpers Ferry	Church affiliated, not-for-profit; limited state support	1867	1955	
Valley College–Princeton	Princeton	Private for-profit	1983	2023	
West Virginia Business College–Wheeling	Wheeling	Private for-profit	1881	2017	
West Virginia College	Flemington	Private not-for-profit	1865 (opened); 1868 (established by the legislature)	1895	

== See also ==
- Higher education in the United States
- List of college athletic programs in West Virginia
- List of recognized higher education accreditation organizations
- Lists of American institutions of higher education

== Bibliography ==
- Ambler, Charles Henry (1951). A History of Education in West Virginia From Early Colonial Times to 1949. Huntington, West Virginia: Standard Printing & Publishing Company. OCLC 1205534 – via Internet Archive.
- Peterson's (2009). Vocational & Technical Schools - East: More Than 2,600 Vocational Schools East of the Mississippi River. Lawrence Township, Mercer County, New Jersey: Peterson's. ISBN 9780768928099. OCLC 191531193. Archived from the original on June 26, 2014 – via Google Books.
- Rice, Otis K. (1970). The Allegheny Frontier: West Virginia Beginnings, 1730–1830. Lexington, Kentucky: University Press of Kentucky. ISBN 0813111900. OCLC 1145784101 – via Internet Archive.
- Rice, Otis K. (1993). West Virginia: A History. Lexington, Kentucky: University Press of Kentucky. ISBN 9780813127330. OCLC 719387818. Archived from the original on January 4, 2014 – via Google Books.
- West Virginia Legislature (1868b). Acts of the Legislature of West Virginia at an Extraordinary Session, Commencing June 2nd, 1868. Wheeling, West Virginia: John Frew, Public Printer. OCLC 422695120 – via Internet Archive.
- West Virginia Legislature (2012). Darrell E. Holmes, Clerk of the West Virginia Senate (ed.). "West Virginia Blue Book, 2012" (PDF). West Virginia Blue Book. Charleston, West Virginia: Chapman Printing. ISSN 0364-7323. OCLC 1251675. Archived from the original (PDF) on October 5, 2015.
- Whitehill, Alexander Reid (1902). History of Education in West Virginia. Washington, D.C.: United States Government Printing Office. OCLC 2860098. Archived from the original on June 26, 2014 – via Google Books.
