= List of accredited HIM programs in the United States and Canada =

In the United States, there are 352 accredited health information management (HIM) and health informatics (HI) programs. Most of these programs are in the associate degree level. In Canada, there are 19 different HIM programs, mostly in the diploma level. However, all these programs are subjected to an accreditation review by their respective organizations: The Commission on Accreditation for Health Informatics and Information Management Education (CAHIIM in the US) and the Canadian College of Health Information Management (CCHIM in Canada).

== United States ==
The CAHIIM has given full accreditation to the following list of HIM and HI programs. However, the master's degree level programs listed makes little or no difference, in terms of whether it is a HIM, a HI, or even both together.

=== Associate degree ===
There are currently 255 American universities and colleges in this list.

==== Alabama ====
- Bishop State Community College in (Alabama) Mobile (Campus based and online)
- Wallace State Community College in (Alabama) Hanceville (Campus based and online)

==== Alaska ====
- University of Alaska Southeast in Sitka (online only)

==== Arizona ====
- Bryan University in (Arizona) Tempe (online only)
- Central Arizona College in Coolidge (online only)
- Phoenix College in (Arizona) Phoenix (Campus based and online)

==== Arkansas ====
- Arkansas Tech University–Ozark Campus in Ozark (Campus based only)
- National Park College in (Arkansas) Hot Springs (Campus based and online)
- Northwest Arkansas Community College in Bentonville (Campus based and online)

==== California ====
- City College of San Francisco in (California) San Francisco (Campus based and online)
- Cosumnes River College in (California) Sacramento (online only)
- Cypress College in (California) Cypress (Campus based and online)
- East Los Angeles College in (California) Monterey Park (Campus based only)
- Saddleback College in (California) Mission Viejo (online only)
- San Diego Mesa College in (California) San Diego (Campus based and online)
- Santa Barbara City College in (California) Santa Barbara (online only)
- Shasta College in (California) Redding (online only)

==== Colorado ====
- Arapahoe Community College in (Colorado) Littleton (online only)
- Front Range Community College in (Colorado) Westminster (Campus based and online)

==== Connecticut ====
- Middlesex Community College in (Connecticut) Middletown (Campus based only)

==== Delaware ====
- Delaware Technical Community College in Wilmington (Campus based only)

==== Florida ====
- Broward College in (Florida) Fort Lauderdale (Campus based only)
- College of Business and Technology in (Florida) Miami (Cutler Bay location) (Campus based only)
- College of Central Florida in Ocala (Campus based and online)
- Daytona State College in (Florida) Daytona Beach (Campus based only)
- Florida Gateway College in Lake City (Campus based and online)
- Florida SouthWestern State College in Fort Myers (Campus based and online)
- Florida State College at Jacksonville in Jacksonville (Campus based and online)
- Indian River State College in (Florida) Fort Pierce (online only)
- Miami Dade College in (Florida) Miami (Campus based only)
- Palm Beach State College in (Florida) Lake Worth Beach (Campus based and online)
- Pensacola State College in (Florida) Pensacola (Campus based and online)
- Santa Fe College in (Florida) Gainesville (online only)
- Seminole State College of Florida in Sanford (online only)
- St. Johns River State College in (Florida) St. Augustine (online only)
- St. Petersburg College in (Florida) St. Petersburg (online only)
- Ultimate Medical Academy in (Florida) Tampa (online only)
- Valencia College in (Florida) Orlando (online only)

==== Georgia ====
- Albany State University in (Georgia (U.S. state)) Albany (online only)
- Athens Technical College in (Georgia (U.S. state)) Athens (Campus based only) (Web site is currently offline)
- Atlanta Technical College in (Georgia (U.S. state)) Atlanta (Campus based only)
- Augusta Technical College in (Georgia (U.S. state)) Augusta (Campus based only)
- Georgia Northwestern Technical College in (Georgia (U.S. state)) Walker County (online only)
- Gwinnett Technical College in (Georgia (U.S. state)) Lawrenceville (Campus based only)
- Lanier Technical College in (Georgia (U.S. state)) Gainesville (Campus based and online)
- Ogeechee Technical College in (Georgia (U.S. state)) Statesboro (online only)
- West Georgia Technical College in (Georgia (U.S. state)) Waco (Campus based only)
- Wiregrass Georgia Technical College in (Georgia (U.S. state)) Valdosta (Campus based and online)

==== Hawaii ====
- Leeward Community College in (Hawaii) Pearl City (Campus based only)

==== Idaho ====
- Idaho State University in Pocatello (online only)

==== Illinois ====
- College of DuPage in (Illinois) Glen Ellyn (Campus based only)
- College of Lake County in (Illinois) Grayslake (Campus based only)
- Danville Area Community College in (Illinois) Danville (Campus based only)
- DeVry University in (Illinois) Naperville (online only)
- Harper College in (Illinois) Palatine (Campus based and online)
- Joliet Junior College in (Illinois) Joliet (Campus based and online)
- McHenry County College in (Illinois) Crystal Lake (Campus based and online)
- Moraine Valley Community College in (Illinois) Palos Hills (Campus based only)
- Northwestern College in (Illinois) Bridgeview (Campus based and online)
- Oakton Community College in (Illinois) Des Plaines (Campus based only)
- Richland Community College in (Illinois) Decatur (online only)
- Southwestern Illinois College in Belleville (Campus based and online)

==== Indiana ====
- Indiana Institute of Technology in Fort Wayne (online only)
- Indiana University Northwest in Gary (Campus based and online)
- Ivy Tech Community College of Indiana in Indianapolis and Fort Wayne (Campus based and online respectively)
- Vincennes University in (Indiana) Vincennes (Campus based and online)

==== Iowa ====
- Indian Hills Community College in (Iowa) Ottumwa (online only)
- Northeast Iowa Community College in Calmar (Campus based and online)
- Scott Community College in (Iowa) Riverdale (online only)

==== Kansas ====
- Hutchinson Community College in (Kansas) Hutchinson (online only)
- Neosho County Community College in (Kansas) Chanute (online only)
- Washburn University in (Kansas) Topeka (online only)

==== Kentucky ====
- American National University in (Kentucky) Louisville (Campus based only)
- Gateway Community and Technical College in (Kentucky) Covington (Campus based and online)
- Hazard Community and Technical College in (Kentucky) Hazard (online only)
- Jefferson Community and Technical College in (Kentucky) Louisville (online only)
- Sullivan University in Kentucky (online only) at the following locations:
  - Louisa and Mayfield

==== Louisiana ====
- Delgado Community College in (Louisiana) New Orleans (Campus based and online)
- Southern University at Shreveport in (Louisiana) Shreveport (Campus based and online)

==== Maine ====
- Beal College in (Maine) Bangor (Campus based only)
- Kennebec Valley Community College in (Maine) Fairfield (Campus based and online)

==== Maryland ====
- Baltimore City Community College in (Maryland) Baltimore (Campus based only)
- Community College of Baltimore County in (Maryland) Baltimore County (Campus based and online)
- Montgomery College in (Maryland) Montgomery County (Campus based and online)
- Prince George's Community College in (Maryland) Largo (Campus based and online)

==== Massachusetts ====
- Fisher College in (Massachusetts) Boston (online only)
- Springfield Technical Community College in (Massachusetts) Springfield (Campus based only)

==== Michigan ====
- Davenport University in (Michigan) Grand Rapids (online only)
- Ferris State University in (Michigan) Big Rapids (Campus based only)
- Macomb Community College in (Michigan) Warren (Campus based and online)
- Schoolcraft College in (Michigan) Livonia (Campus based only)
- Southwestern Michigan College in Dowagiac (Campus based only)

==== Minnesota ====
- Anoka Technical College in (Minnesota) Anoka (online only)
- Minnesota State Community and Technical College in Minnesota (all online only) at the following locations:
  - Moorhead, Fergus Falls, Detroit Lakes, and Wadena
- Minnesota West Community and Technical College in Minnesota (all online only) at the following locations:
  - Canby, Granite Falls, Jackson, Pipestone, and Worthington
- Rasmussen College in Minnesota (Campus based and online) at the following locations:
  - Bloomington, Brooklyn Park, (Illinois) Aurora and Rockford, and (Wisconsin) Green Bay
- Ridgewater College in (Minnesota) Willmar (online only)
- Rochester Community and Technical College in (Minnesota) Rochester (online only)
- Saint Paul College in (Minnesota) Saint Paul (Campus based and online)
- St. Cloud Technical and Community College in (Minnesota) St. Cloud (Campus based and online)

==== Mississippi ====
- Hinds Community College in (Mississippi) Raymond (Campus based and online)
- Itawamba Community College in (Mississippi) Tupelo (Campus based and online)
- Meridian Community College in (Mississippi) Meridian (Campus based and online)
- Southwest Mississippi Community College in Summit (Campus based and online)

==== Missouri ====
- East Central College in (Missouri) Union (online only)
- Jefferson College in (Missouri) Hillsboro (Campus based and online)
- Metropolitan Community College in (Missouri) Kansas City (Campus based and online)
- Ozarks Technical Community College in (Missouri) Springfield (online only)
- St. Charles Community College in (Missouri) St. Charles (online only)
- St. Louis Community College at Forest Park in (Missouri) St. Louis (Campus based and online)
- State Fair Community College in (Missouri) Sedalia (online only)

==== Montana ====
- Great Falls College Montana State University in Great Falls (online only)

==== Nebraska ====
- Central Community College in (Nebraska) Grand Island (online only)
- Clarkson College in (Nebraska) Omaha (online only)
- Metropolitan Community College in (Nebraska) Omaha (online only)
- Northeast Community College in (Nebraska) Norfolk (Campus based and online)
- Western Nebraska Community College in Scottsbluff (online only)

==== Nevada ====
- College of Southern Nevada in Clark County (Campus based and online)

==== New Jersey ====
- Camden County College in (New Jersey) Blackwood (online only)
- Passaic County Community College in (New Jersey) Paterson (Campus based and online)
- Raritan Valley Community College in (New Jersey) Branchburg (online only)
- Rowan College at Burlington County in (New Jersey) Mount Laurel (Campus based and online)

==== New Mexico ====
- Central New Mexico Community College in Albuquerque (online only)
- San Juan College in (New Mexico) Farmington (online only)
- The University of New Mexico in Gallup (Campus based and online)

==== New York ====
- Alfred State College in (New York (state)) Alfred (online only)
- Borough of Manhattan Community College in (New York (state)) New York City (Campus based only)
- SUNY Erie in (New York (state)) Williamsville (Campus based and online)
- Mohawk Valley Community College in (New York (state)) Utica (online only)
- Nassau Community College in (New York (state)) Garden City (Campus based only)
- Onondaga Community College in (New York (state)) Syracuse (Campus based and online)
- Plaza College in (New York (state)) Forest Hills, Queens (New York City) (Campus based only)
- Suffolk County Community College in (New York (state)) Selden (Campus based and online)
- SUNY Broome Community College in (New York (state)) Binghamton (Campus based and online)

==== North Carolina ====
- Brunswick Community College in (North Carolina) Bolivia (Campus based only)
- Catawba Valley Community College in (North Carolina) Hickory (Campus based only)
- Central Carolina Community College in (North Carolina) Harnett County (online only)
- Central Piedmont Community College in (North Carolina) Charlotte (online only)
- Craven Community College in (North Carolina) New Bern (Campus based and online)
- Davidson County Community College in (North Carolina) Davidson County (Campus based and online)
- Durham Technical Community College in (North Carolina) Durham (Campus based and online)
- Edgecombe Community College in (North Carolina) Tarboro (online only)
- McDowell Technical Community College in (North Carolina) Marion (Campus based and online)
- Pitt Community College in (North Carolina) Winterville (online only)
- Southwestern Community College in (North Carolina) Sylva (Campus based and online)

==== North Dakota ====
- North Dakota State College of Science in Wahpeton (online only)

==== Ohio ====
- Cincinnati State Technical and Community College in (Ohio) Cincinnati (online only)
- Columbus State Community College in (Ohio) Columbus (online only)
- Cuyahoga Community College in (Ohio) Cuyahoga County (Campus based only)
- Eastern Gateway Community College in (Ohio) Steubenville (Campus based and online)
- Lakeland Community College in (Ohio) Kirtland (Campus based only)
- Marion Technical College in (Ohio) Marion (online only)
- Mercy College of Ohio in Toledo (online only)
- Owens Community College in (Ohio) Toledo (Campus based and online)
- Sinclair Community College in (Ohio) Dayton (Campus based and online)
- Stark State College in (Ohio) North Canton (Campus based and online)
- Terra State Community College in (Ohio) Fremont (Campus based and online)
- University of Cincinnati in (Ohio) Cincinnati (online only)
- University of Northwestern Ohio in Lima (Campus based and online)
- Zane State College in (Ohio) Zanesville (online only)

==== Oklahoma ====
- Rose State College in (Oklahoma) Midwest City (Campus based only)
- Tulsa Community College in (Oklahoma) Tulsa (Campus based and online)

==== Oregon ====
- Central Oregon Community College in Bend (Campus based only)
- Chemeketa Community College in (Oregon) Salem (online only)
- Lane Community College in (Oregon) Eugene (online only)
- Portland Community College in (Oregon) Portland (online only)

==== Pennsylvania ====
- Community College of Allegheny County in (Pennsylvania) Allegheny County (Campus based only)
- Lehigh Carbon Community College in (Pennsylvania) Schnecksville (Campus based and online)
- Peirce College in (Pennsylvania) Philadelphia (Campus based and online)
- South Hills School of Business & Technology in Pennsylvania (Campus based only) at the following locations:
  - State College & Altoona

==== Puerto Rico ====
- Huertas College in (Puerto Rico) Caguas (Campus based only and in Spanish)

==== South Carolina ====
- Florence–Darlington Technical College in (South Carolina) Florence (Campus based only)
- Greenville Technical College in (South Carolina) Greenville (Campus based and online)
- Trident Technical College in (South Carolina) Charleston (Campus based only)

==== South Dakota ====
- Dakota State University in (South Dakota) Madison (Campus based and online)
- National American University in (South Dakota) Rapid City (online only)

==== Tennessee ====
- Concorde Career College in (Tennessee) Memphis (Campus based only)
- Dyersburg State Community College in (Tennessee) Dyersburg (online only)
- Roane State Community College in (Tennessee) Harriman (online only)
- Volunteer State Community College in (Tennessee) Gallatin (Campus based and online)
- Walters State Community College in (Tennessee) Morristown (online only)

==== Texas ====
- Austin Community College District in (Texas) Austin (Campus based only)
- Blinn College in (Texas) Brenham (online only)
- College of the Mainland in Texas City (Campus based and online)
- Collin College in (Texas) Collin County (online only)
- Del Mar College in (Texas) Corpus Christi (Campus based and online)
- El Paso Community College in (Texas) El Paso (Campus based and online)
- Houston Community College in (Texas) Houston (Campus based and online)
- Lamar Institute of Technology in (Texas) Beaumont (online only)
- Lee College in (Texas) Baytown (Campus based and online)
- Lone Star College–North Harris in (Texas) Harris County (online only)
- McLennan Community College in (Texas) Waco (online only)
- Midland College in (Texas) Midland (online only)
- Panola College in (Texas) Carthage (Campus based and online)
- San Jacinto College in (Texas) Houston (Campus based and online)
- South Texas College in McAllen (Campus based and online)
- St. Philip's College in (Texas) San Antonio (online only)
- Tarrant County College in (Texas) Fort Worth (Campus based only)
- Texas State Technical College in Abilene (online only)
- Tyler Junior College in (Texas) Tyler (online only)
- Vernon College in (Texas) Vernon (Campus based and online)
- Wharton County Junior College in (Texas) Wharton (online only)

==== Utah ====
- Weber State University in (Utah) Ogden (Campus based and online)

==== Virginia ====
- ECPI University in (Virginia) Newport News and Richmond (online only)
- Lord Fairfax Community College in (Virginia) Middletown (online only)
- Mountain Empire Community College in (Virginia) Big Stone Gap (Campus based and online)
- Northern Virginia Community College in Springfield (Campus based and online)
- Tidewater Community College in Virginia Beach (Campus based only)

==== Washington ====
- Shoreline Community College in (Washington (state)) Shoreline (online only)
- Spokane Community College in (Washington (state)) Spokane (Campus based and online)
- Tacoma Community College in (Washington (state)) Tacoma (online only)

==== West Virginia ====
- Blue Ridge Community and Technical College in (West Virginia) Martinsburg (Campus based and online)
- Mountwest Community and Technical College in (West Virginia) Huntington (Campus based and online)
- Pierpont Community and Technical College in (West Virginia) Fairmont (Campus based only)
- West Virginia Northern Community College in Wheeling (Campus based and online)

==== Wisconsin ====
- Chippewa Valley Technical College in (Wisconsin) Eau Claire (Campus based and online)
- Fox Valley Technical College in (Wisconsin) Grand Chute (Campus based and online)
- Gateway Technical College in (Wisconsin) Kenosha (online only)
- Herzing University in (Wisconsin) Milwaukee (online only)
- Lakeshore Technical College in (Wisconsin) Cleveland (Campus based and online)
- Mid-State Technical College in (Wisconsin) Marshfield (online only)
- Moraine Park Technical College in (Wisconsin) Fond du Lac (online only)
- Northeast Wisconsin Technical College in Green Bay (online only)
- Southwest Wisconsin Technical College in Fennimore (online only)
- Waukesha County Technical College in (Wisconsin) Pewaukee (Campus based and online)
- Western Technical College in (Wisconsin) La Crosse (Campus based and online)
- Wisconsin Indianhead Technical College in Shell Lake (online only)

=== Bachelor's degree ===
There are currently 73 American universities and colleges in this list.

==== A ====
- Alabama State University in Montgomery (Campus based only)
- American Public University System in (West Virginia) Charles Town (online only)
- Arkansas Tech University in Russellville (Campus based only)
- Ashford University in (California) San Diego (online only)
- Augusta University in (Georgia (U.S. state)) Augusta (Campus based and online)

==== C ====
- Charter Oak State College in (Connecticut) New Britain (online only)
- Chicago State University in (Illinois) Chicago (Campus based only)
- Clarkson College in (Nebraska) Omaha (online only)
- Coppin State University in (Maryland) Baltimore (Campus based and online)
- CUNY School of Professional Studies in (New York (state)) New York City (online only)

==== D ====
- Dakota State University in (South Dakota) Madison (Campus based and online)
- Davenport University in (Michigan) Grand Rapids (online only)
- DeVry University in (Illinois) Naperville (online only)

==== E ====
- East Carolina University in (North Carolina) Greenville (Campus based only)
- Eastern Kentucky University in Richmond (Campus based only)

==== F ====
- Ferris State University in (Michigan) Big Rapids (Campus based and online)
- Fisher College in (Massachusetts) Boston (online only)
- Florida A&M University in Tallahassee (Campus based only)
- Franklin University in (Ohio) Columbus (online only)

==== G ====
- Grand Valley State University in (Michigan) Allendale (Campus based only)

==== H ====
- Herzing University in (Wisconsin) Milwaukee (online only)

==== I ====
- Illinois State University in Normal (Campus based and online)
- Indiana University in Indianapolis (Campus based and online)
- Indiana University Northwest in Gary (Campus based and online)

==== K ====
- Keiser University in (Florida) Fort Lauderdale (online only)

==== L ====
- Loma Linda University in (California) Loma Linda (Campus based and online)
- Long Island University (LIU Post) in (New York (state)) Brookville (Campus based and online)
- Louisiana Tech University in Ruston (Campus based and online)

==== M ====
- Missouri Western State University in St. Joseph (online only)

==== P ====
- Parker University in (Texas) Dallas (online only)
- Peirce College in (Pennsylvania) Philadelphia (Campus based and online)

==== R ====
- Rasmussen College in (Minnesota) Bloomington (online only)
- Rutgers University in (New Jersey) New Brunswick (online only)

==== S ====
- Saint Joseph's College of Maine in Standish (online only)
- Saint Louis University in (Missouri) St. Louis (Campus based only)
- San Diego Mesa College in (California) San Diego (Campus based and online)
- Shasta College in (California) Redding (online only)
- Southern New Hampshire University in Manchester (online only)
- Southern University at New Orleans in (Louisiana) New Orleans (Campus based and online)
- Southwestern Oklahoma State University in Weatherford (online only)
- Stephens College in (Missouri) Columbia (online only)
- SUNY Polytechnic Institute in (New York (state)) Albany (online only)

==== T ====
- Tacoma Community College in (Washington (state)) Tacoma (online only)
- Temple University in (Pennsylvania) Philadelphia (Campus based only)
- Tennessee State University in Nashville (Campus based and online)
- Texas Southern University in Houston (Campus based only)
- Texas State University in San Marcos (Campus based and online)
- The College of St. Scholastica in (Minnesota) Duluth (Campus based and online)
- The Ohio State University in Columbus (Campus based only)

==== U ====
- University of Central Florida in Orange County (Campus based and online)
- University of Cincinnati in (Ohio) Cincinnati (online only)
- University of Detroit Mercy in (Michigan) Detroit (Campus based and online)
- University of Illinois at Chicago in Chicago (Campus based and online)
- University of Kansas Medical Center in Kansas City (Campus based and online)
- University of Louisiana at Lafayette in Lafayette (Campus based only)
- University of Mississippi Medical Center in Jackson (online only)
- University of Pittsburgh in (Pennsylvania) Pittsburgh (Campus based only)
- University of Puerto Rico, Medical Sciences Campus in San Juan (Campus based only) (Web site is currently offline)
- University of Saint Mary in (Kansas) Leavenworth (Campus based only)
- University of South Carolina Upstate in Spartanburg (online only)
- University of Toledo in (Ohio) Toledo (online only)
- University of Washington in (Washington (state)) Seattle (Campus based only)
- University of Wisconsin in Wisconsin (all online only):
  - University of Wisconsin–Green Bay in Green Bay
  - University of Wisconsin–Parkside in Somers
  - University of Wisconsin–Stevens Point in Stevens Point

==== W ====
- Weber State University in (Utah) Ogden (Campus based and online)
- Western Governors University in (Utah) Salt Lake City (online only)
- Western Kentucky University in Bowling Green (online only)
- William Carey University in (Mississippi) Hattiesburg (Campus based only)

=== Master's degree in health information management ===
- Dakota State University in (South Dakota) Madison (online only)
- Davenport University in (Michigan) Grand Rapids (online only)
- Texas State University in San Marcos (online only)
- The College of St. Scholastica in (Minnesota) Duluth (online only)
- University of Tennessee Health Science Center in Memphis (online only)

=== Master's degree in health informatics ===
- Boston University in (Massachusetts) Boston (Campus based and online)
- Drexel University in (Pennsylvania) Philadelphia (online only)
- East Carolina University in (North Carolina) Greenville (Campus based and online)
- Florida International University in University Park (online only)
- George Mason University in (Virginia) Fairfax County (Campus based and online)
- Indiana University in Indianapolis (Campus based and online)
- Louisiana Tech University in Ruston (online only)
- Marshall University in (West Virginia) Huntington (Campus based only)
- Medical University of South Carolina in Charleston (Campus based and online)
- Oregon Health & Science University in Portland (online only)
- Southern Illinois University Edwardsville in Edwardsville (online only)
- Temple University in (Pennsylvania) Philadelphia (Campus based and online)
- The College of St. Scholastica in (Minnesota) Duluth (online only)
- University of Alabama at Birmingham in Birmingham (online only)
- University of Central Florida in Orange County (online only)
- University of Illinois at Chicago in Chicago (online only)
- University of Maryland Global Campus in Adelphi (online only)
- University of Mississippi Medical Center in Jackson (online only)
- University of Pittsburgh in (Pennsylvania) Pittsburgh (Campus based only)
- University of South Carolina in Columbia (Campus based and online)
- University of Texas Health Science Center at Houston in Houston (Campus based and online)
- University of Washington in (Washington (state)) Seattle (Campus based only)

== Canada ==
In Canada, the Canadian College of Health Information Management (CCHIM) has listed the following accredited Canadian institutions.

=== Certificate ===
- Alberta: Bow Valley College in Calgary
- Alberta: MCG Career College in Calgary, Cold Lake, & Red Deer
- Alberta: Royal Canadian Business College in Calgary
- British Columbia: CanScribe Career College in Kelowna
- Manitoba: Manitoba Institute of Trades and Technology in Winnipeg
- Ontario: Fanshawe College in London
- Ontario: HealthCareCAN/CHA Learning Health Information Associate (in conjunction with Algonquin College) in Ottawa
- Ontario: HealthCareCAN/CHA Learning Health Information Coding Specialist in Ottawa
- Ontario: HealthCareCAN/CHA Learning Health Information Management (in conjunction with Algonquin College) in Ottawa
- Ontario: Solventum Clinical Documentation Improvement Specialist Program in Mississauga

=== Diploma ===
- Alberta: Southern Alberta Institute of Technology in Calgary
- British Columbia: Ashton College in Vancouver
- British Columbia: Sprott Shaw College in Victoria
- British Columbia: Western Community College in Abbotsford or Surrey
- Manitoba: Manitoba Institute of Trades & Technology in Winnipeg
- Manitoba: Red River College Polytechnic in Winnipeg
- New Brunswick & Nova Scotia: Eastern College in Fredericton, Halifax, Moncton, & Saint John
- Newfoundland and Labrador: College of the North Atlantic in Stephenville
- Nova Scotia: Centre for Distance Education (CD-ED) in Sydney
- Nova Scotia: Nova Scotia Community College in Halifax
- Ontario: Algonquin College in Ottawa
- Ontario: Anderson College in London
- Ontario: George Brown College in Toronto
- Ontario: Georgian College in Barrie
- Ontario: Sheridan College in Mississauga
- Ontario: TriOS College
- Quebec: Collège Laflèche in Trois-Rivières (in French)

=== Postbaccalaureate diploma ===
- British Columbia: Douglas College in Coquitlam

=== Postgraduate certificate ===
- British Columbia: University of Victoria in Victoria
- Ontario: Mohawk College in Hamilton

=== Bachelor's degree ===
- British Columbia: Douglas College in Coquitlam
- Ontario: Conestoga College in Kitchener
- Ontario: Toronto Metropolitan University in Toronto

=== Master's degree ===
- Ontario: Brock University in St. Catharines
- Saskatchewan: Johnson Shoyama Graduate School of Public Policy (with the University of Regina) in Regina
