= West Virginia Community and Technical College System =

Location of West Virginia Community and Technical College System campuses. For colleges with multiple campuses, the flagship campus is labeled.

WVCTCS institutions
Name	Established	Enrollment	Location
Blue Ridge	2005	2,195	Martinsburg
BridgeValley	2014	1,750	South Charleston
Eastern	1999	414	Moorefield
MCTC	2008	1,467	Huntington
New River	2003	1,262	Beaver
Pierpont	1974	1,938	Fairmont
Southern	1971	1,447	Mount Gay
Northern	1972	1,274	Wheeling
WVU Parkersburg	1961	2,584	Parkersburg

West Virginia Community and Technical College System is a statewide system of nine regional community colleges serving the state of West Virginia. It was created to bring uniformity to the state's system of community colleges. Previously some area had schools that were a part of large universities, others a part of small colleges, and others were stand alone. There also was a great overlap between different community colleges and between the community colleges and the state universities in the same areas. The system tries to define the programmatic distinctions between the community college and the state universities, and the geographic service area of each community college.

The system consists of:

- Blue Ridge Community and Technical College, commonly called "Blue Ridge", based in Martinsburg, formerly the community college of Shepherd University. The school serves the three easternmost counties of West Virginia's eastern panhandle.
- BridgeValley Community and Technical College, commonly called "BridgeValley", it is a merger of Bridgemont Community and Technical College and Kanawha Valley Community and Technical College and maintains both campuses and all course offerings of the former schools. The Montgomery campus (formerly Bridgemont) serves the upper Kanawha Valley region, and the South Charleston campus (formerly Kanawha Valley) serves the greater Charleston metropolitan area.
- Eastern West Virginia Community and Technical College, commonly called "Eastern", is based in Moorefield. This college serves the Potomac Highlands of West Virginia by offering classes throughout Grant, Hampshire, Hardy, Mineral, Pendleton, and Tucker counties via their Discovery Centers. Eastern has a Technology Center located in Petersburg, WV. This college offers baccalaureate transfer programs, customized degree options for adult learners, career and technical training programs, and workforce education options. Programs of study include accounting, administrative support, art, automotive repair, business, computer technology, early childhood development, electromechanical technology, information technology, maintenance, medical assistant, nursing, wind technology, and numerous skill sets and short term training options in the education, energy, healthcare, information technology, maintenance, and transportation industries.
- Mountwest Community and Technical College, commonly called "MCTC", based in Huntington, formerly the community college of Marshall University. This school serves the greater Huntington metropolitan area. Its campus can be found at the top of 5th Street hill in Huntington.
- New River Community and Technical College, commonly called "New River" based in Beckley, combining programs of Bluefield State University, Glenville State University, West Virginia University Institute of Technology and other colleges in the area. The school offers classes in Beckley, and four other locations, including space leased on the campus of the West Virginia School of Osteopathic Medicine. The school serves southeastern West Virginia.
- Pierpont Community and Technical College, commonly called "Pierpont" and named for Francis Pierpont, based in Fairmont, formerly the community college of Fairmont State University. It currently leases space from FSU, West Virginia University and local high schools. The school serves north central West Virginia. Like West Virginia State, Fairmont State allows Pierpont students to participate in its athletics and other programs.
- Southern West Virginia Community and Technical College, commonly called "Southern", which was founded in 1970 from the Logan and Williamson branches of Marshall University. The school is based in Logan and serves the southwestern West Virginia coalfield region from five instruction sites. It has the most buildings of its own of any community college in the system.
- West Virginia Northern Community College, commonly called "Northern", which was also founded in 1970 and is based in Wheeling and serves the Northern Panhandle of West Virginia. The main building is the converted Wheeling train station.
- West Virginia University at Parkersburg, commonly called "WVU Parkersburg", was founded as the "Parkersburg Branch of West Virginia University" in 1961 before going through other name changes and was formerly a regional campus of West Virginia University. The Jackson County Center in Ripley, West Virginia is a smaller center of WVU Parkersburg. WVU Parkersburg is the only member of the system allowed to be independently accredited to offer four-year degree, and is classified as a four-year college by the Carnegie Classification of Institutions of Higher Education.
