= Southern West Virginia =

Region of West Virginia

Coordinates: 37°50′N 81°10′W

Southern West Virginia in Blue

Southern West Virginia is a culturally and geographically distinct region in the U.S. state of West Virginia. Southern West Virginia has coal mining heritage and Southern affinity, including being part of the Bible Belt. The region is also closely identified with Southwestern Virginia and Eastern Kentucky, with close proximity to Western North Carolina and East Tennessee, which are all part of Appalachia and the Upland South. The largest towns within Southern West Virginia are Bluefield, Huntington, then followed by Charleston.

Southern West Virginia, in a cultural and historical context, includes Boone County, Fayette County, Greenbrier County, Lincoln County, Logan County, McDowell County, Mercer County, Cabell County, Mingo County, Monroe County, Nicholas County, Raleigh County, Kanawha County, Wayne County, Summers County, and Wyoming County.

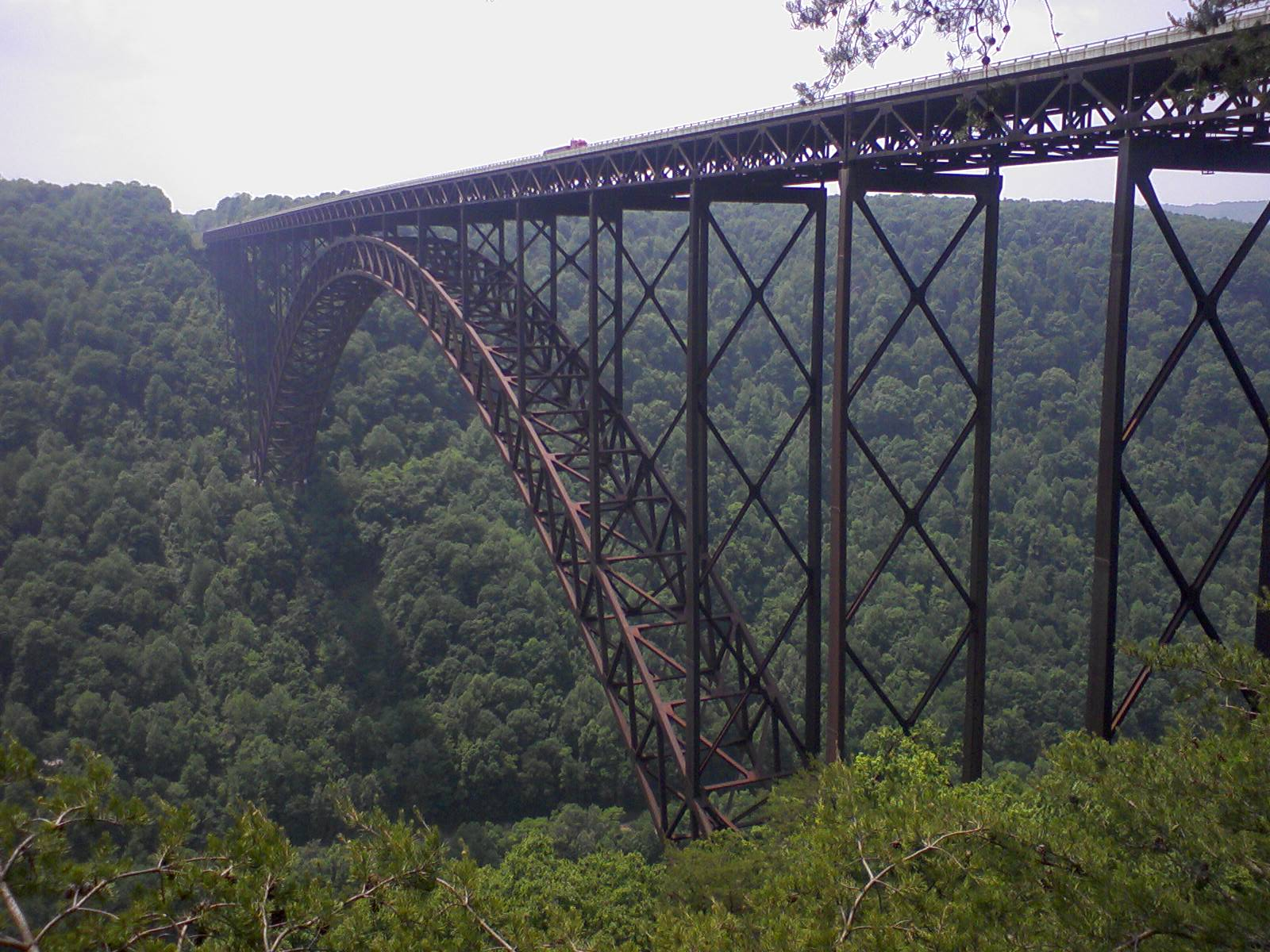
The New River Gorge Bridge located in Fayette County. Completed in 1977, it is the third longest arch bridge in the world.

The City of Charleston, in Kanawha County, is the largest city in this region, followed by Huntington, in Cabell County and then Beckley in Raleigh County.

== Attractions ==
Places of interest and potential attractions include New River Gorge, New River Gorge Bridge, Pipestem State Park, Tamarack, Best of West Virginia, Lake Shawnee Abandoned Amusement Park, and The Greenbrier.

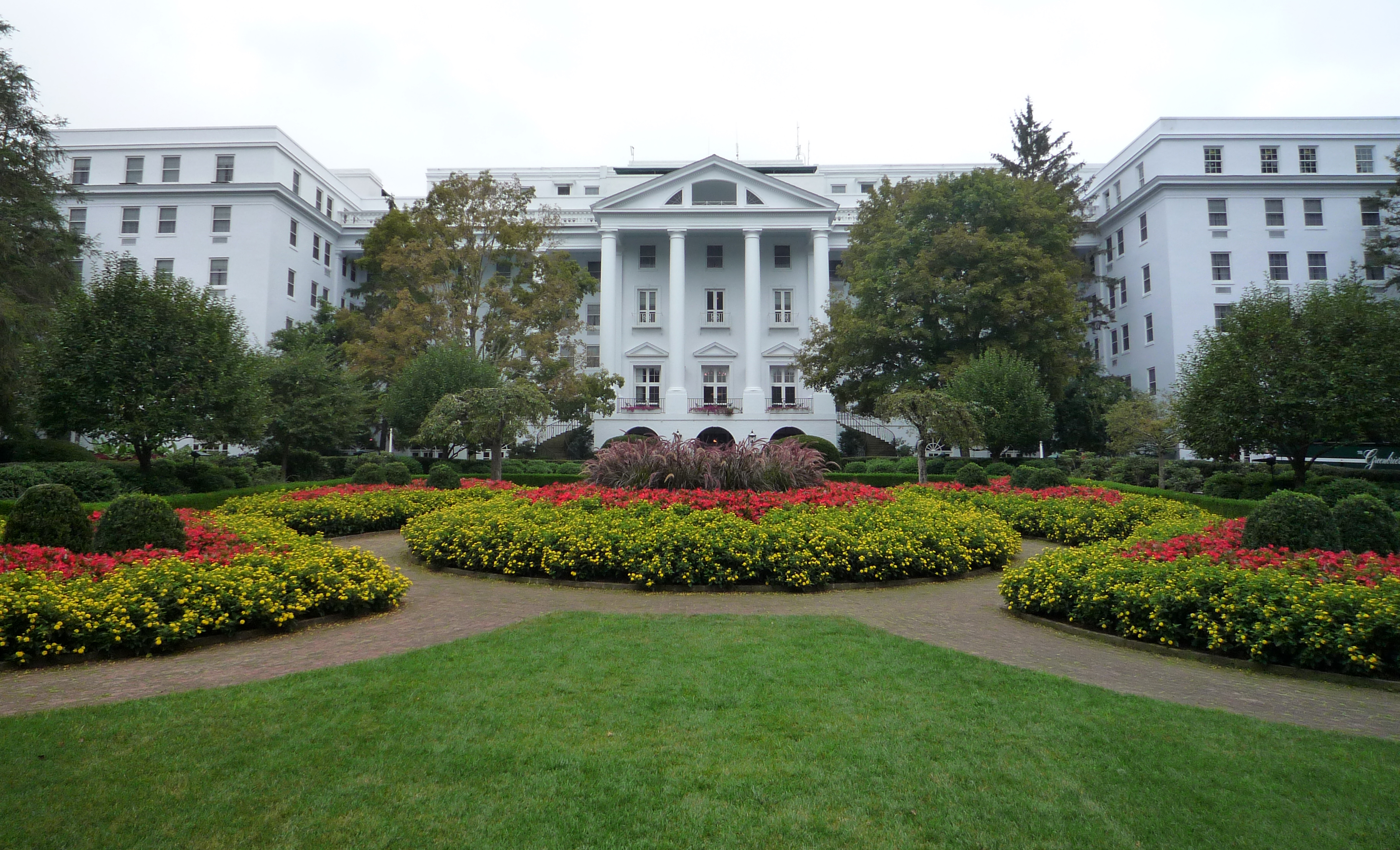
The Greenbrier resort located Greenbrier county.

Winterplace Ski Resort and Summersville Lake are both recreation options also present here.

== Educational institutions ==
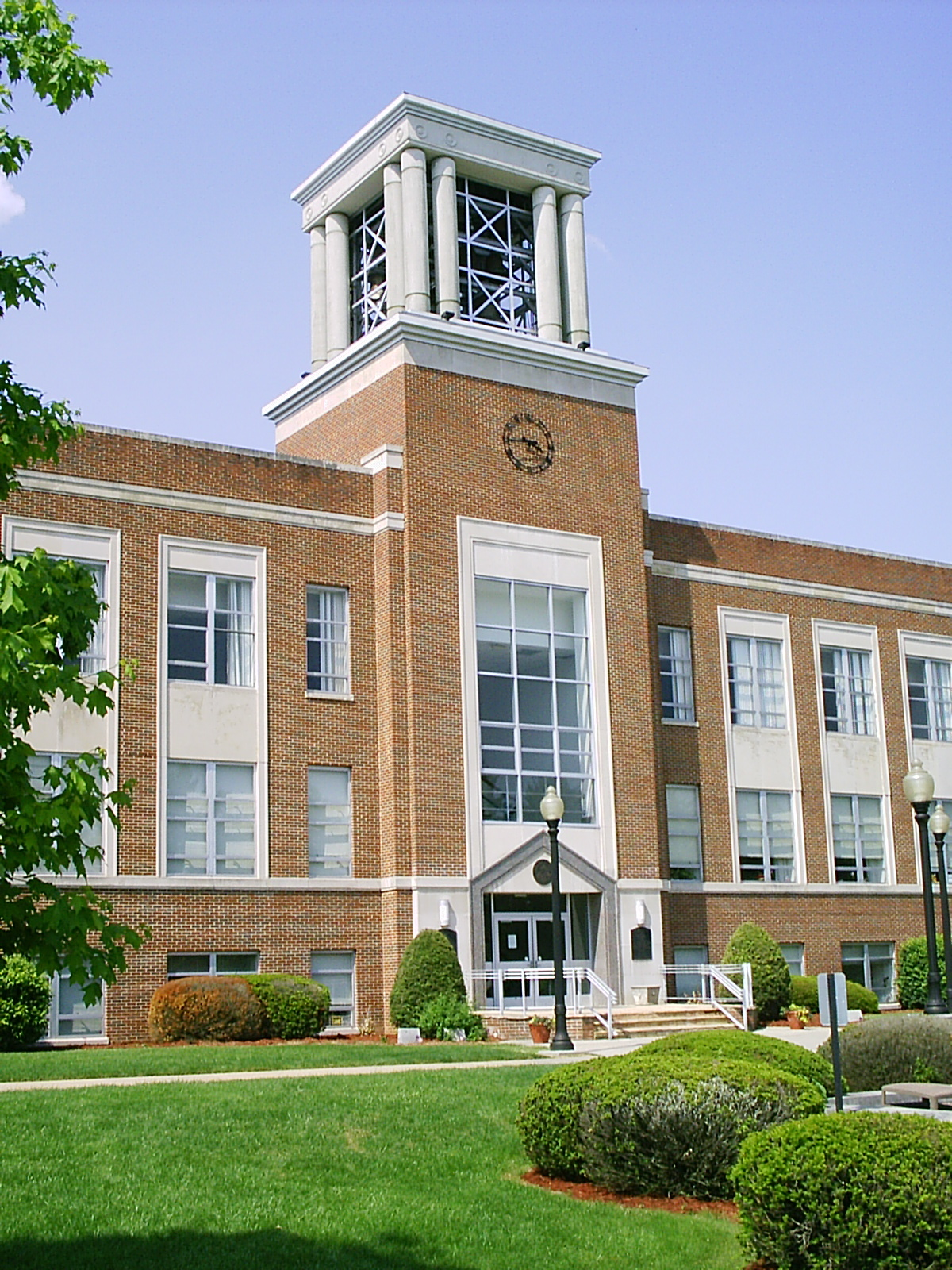
Marsh Hall and its Bell Tower at Concord University

=== Universities and colleges ===
Southern West Virginia's universities and colleges include Marshall University, Appalachian Bible College, Bluefield State University, Bridgemont Community and Technical College, Concord University, University of Charleston–Beckley, New River Community and Technical College, Southern West Virginia Community and Technical College, West Virginia School of Osteopathic Medicine, and West Virginia University Institute of Technology.

== Historical events and landmarks ==
The main historical events and landmarks located in Southern West Virginia are the Hatfield–McCoy feud, the folklore tale of John Henry (centered around Big Bend Tunnel in Talcott, WV, and The West Virginia coal wars.

== See also ==
- Southwest Virginia
