= Blue Ridge Community College =

Blue Ridge Community College may refer to:

- Blue Ridge Community College (North Carolina), Henderson and Transylvania Counties
- Blue Ridge Community College (Virginia), Weyers Cave, Augusta County
- Blue Ridge Community and Technical College, Martinsburg, West Virginia
