= Eastern West Virginia Community and Technical College =

College in Moorefield, West Virginia, U.S.

Coordinates: 39.075804°N 78.930679°W

- Type: Public community college
- Established: 1999; 27 years ago
- Parent institution: West Virginia Community and Technical College System
- Accreditation: Higher Learning Commission
- President: Thomas Striplin
- Students: 100+
- Location: Moorefield, West Virginia, United States
- Website: easternwv.edu

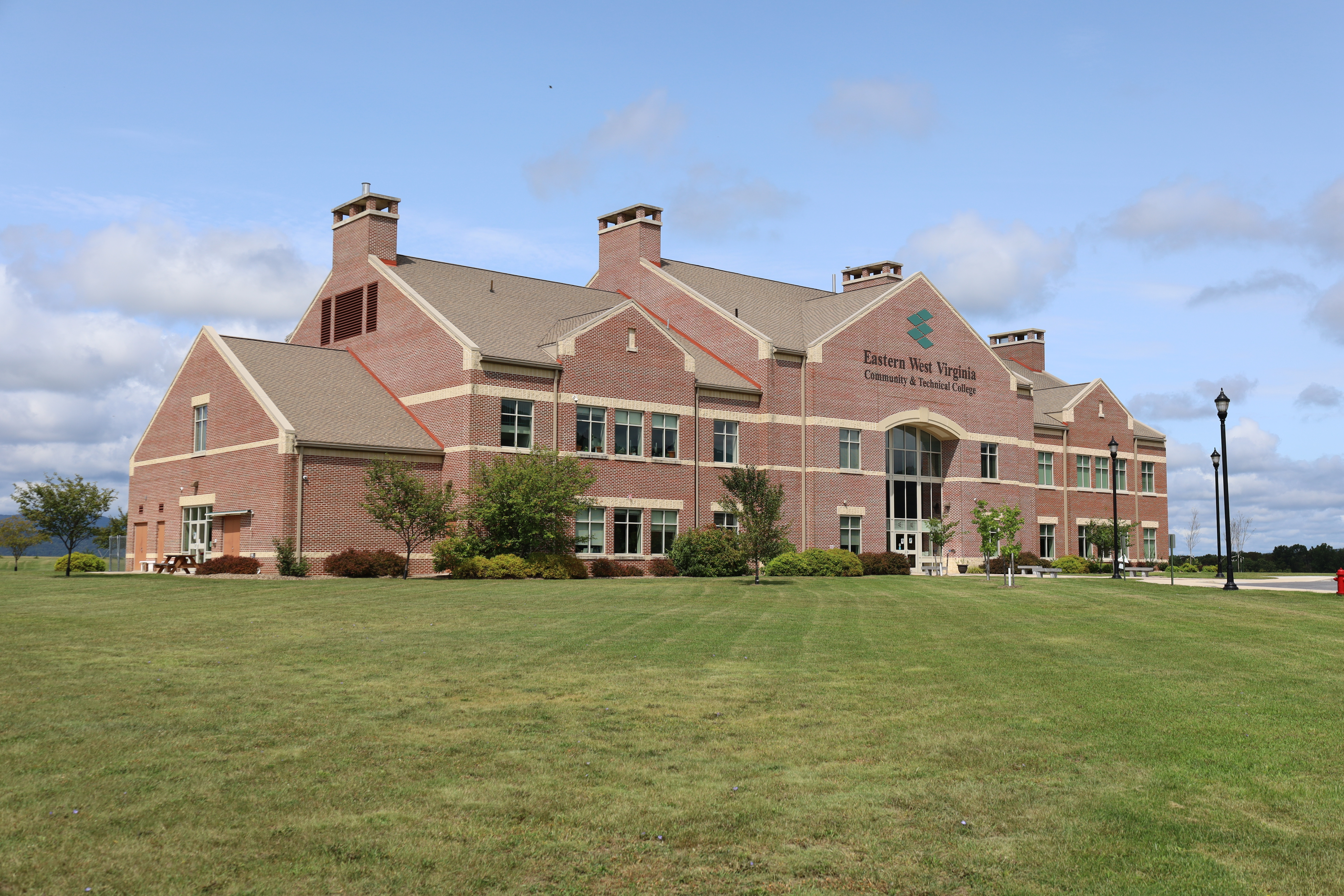
The college building in 2020

Eastern West Virginia Community & Technical College (EWVCTC) is a public community college with its main campus in Moorefield, West Virginia. Established in 1999, Eastern WVCTC offers 11 degree programs as well as numerous skill sets and certificates. It is part of the West Virginia Community and Technical College System.

== Academics ==
Eastern WVCTC offers the Associate in Applied Science (A.A.S.) degree, Associate in Arts (A.A.), Associate in Science (A.S.), and customized degree programs. Additionally, it also offers apprenticeships and other career development opportunities and credentials.
