= West Virginia University at Parkersburg =

Public college in Parkersburg, West Virginia, US

- Seal of West Virginia University at Parkersburg
- Former names: Parkersburg Branch of West Virginia University (1961–1966), West Virginia University-Parkersburg Center (1966–1971), Parkersburg Community College (1971–1989)
- Motto: Summum Bonum Latin
- Motto in English: The Highest Good
- Type: Public community college
- Established: 1961; 65 years ago
- Parent institution: West Virginia Community and Technical College System
- Accreditation: HLC
- President: Torie Jackson
- Faculty: Total: 257 (93 full-time / 164 part-time)
- Administrative staff: 100+
- Students: 2,597 (Fall 2025)
- Undergraduates: 2,597
- Location: Parkersburg, West Virginia, United States; 39°13′0″N 81°30′21″W
- Campus: Small city
- Student newspaper: The Chronicle
- Nickname: Riverhawks
- Mascot: Ricky the Riverhawk
- Website: wvup.edu

West Virginia University at Parkersburg (WVUP and WVU Parkersburg) is a public community college in Parkersburg, West Virginia, United States. Although it was originally part of West Virginia University, it is now an independent public institution with its own board of governors and degree-granting authority. Conceived as a community college to serve seven counties in west central West Virginia, it now offers baccalaureate programs. It is one of the largest community colleges in West Virginia with over 2,500 students.

WVU Parkersburg is accredited by the Higher Learning Commission.

== History ==
The college was founded in 1961 as the Parkersburg Branch of West Virginia University. The school's name was changed to West Virginia University-Parkersburg Center in 1966. It became Parkersburg Community College (PCC) in 1971 and was originally governed by the West Virginia Board of Regents. In a reorganization of the state's higher education governance structure in 1989, the West Virginia Legislature enacted S.B. 420 which, among other initiatives, renamed PCC as West Virginia University at Parkersburg, designating it a regional campus of WVU, and transferred its governance to the newly formed University System of West Virginia.

In 2008, the governance structure of WVU Parkersburg was changed by the state legislature. WVU Parkersburg is now controlled locally by a board of governors and is part of a statewide network of independently accredited community colleges known as the West Virginia Community and Technical College System (CTCS). The WVU Parkersburg Board of Governors approved a Memorandum of Understanding with WVU on May 18, 2009, which outlined a formal relationship between the two schools and designated WVU Parkersburg as an "affiliated institution” of WVU.

=== Naming issues ===
The school was founded as the Parkersburg Branch of West Virginia University in 1961. Its name was changed to West Virginia University-Parkersburg Center in 1966 and then Parkersburg Community College in 1971. Under Governor Gaston Caperton in 1990, a redesign of the state system of higher education was proposed. The state Speaker of the House was from Parkersburg and added the renaming to the bill. In 1995 this system was replaced by yet another system of college organization under Governor Cecil Underwood, however the school retained the name WVU Parkersburg.

In 2008, the state adopted another system of college organization and "divorced" the community colleges from their parent institutions. WVU and WVU Parkersburg developed several agreements and a memorandum of understanding in the spring of 2009 allowing WVU Parkersburg to retain its name in an "evergreen" agreement.

=== Presidents ===
- Todd Bullard, Director, Parkersburg Branch of West Virginia University
- Dallas Shaffer (1963), Acting Director, Parkersburg Branch of West Virginia University
- B.L. Coffindaffer (1964–1971), Director, Parkersburg Branch of WVU, 1964–1966, WVU-Parkersburg Center, 1966–1971
- Robert H. Stauffer (1971–1974), President, Parkersburg Community College
- Paul Heath (1974), Acting President, Parkersburg Community College
- Jerry Lee Jones (1974–1978), President, Parkersburg Community College
- M. Douglas Call (1977–1978), Acting President, Parkersburg Community College
- Byron McClenney (1978–1981), President, Parkersburg Community College
- Jim Hales (1981), Acting President, Parkersburg Community College
- Eldon Miller (1982–2000), President, Parkersburg Community College, Campus President, West Virginia University at Parkersburg, 1982–89, Regional Vice President, West Virginia University, 1989–2000
- Erik Bitterbaum (2000–2003), Campus President, Regional Vice President, West Virginia University, 2000–2003
- Joseph L. Badgley, Interim Campus President, Regional Vice President, West Virginia University, 2003–2004
- Marie Foster Gnage (2004–2014), President, West Virginia University at Parkersburg, 2004–2014, Regional Vice President, West Virginia University, 2004–2008
- Rhonda Tracy (2014), Interim President
- Fletcher M. Lamkin (2015–2018), President
- Chris Gilmer (2018–2022), President
- Torie Jackson (2022), Interim President
- Torie Jackson (2023–present), President

== Campus ==
WVU Parkersburg is located on the outskirts of the city of Parkersburg. The campus is home to, among various buildings, a library, the main administrative building, the College Activities Center, the Workforce and Community Education building, and the Caperton Center for Applied Technology, which opened in 1999. Recently completed facilities include the Applied Technology Lab, the Early Childhood Learning Center, and Eldon Miller Plaza. WVU Parkersburg does not have any student housing on campus; it is a commuter school.

The school originally opened in an abandoned elementary school on Emerson Avenue in Parkersburg in 1961. The bell from the elementary school, which was cast in 1902 by the Meneely Bell Company, is still used in campus ceremonies and is part of the college's official seal. In 1965, Wood County voters approved a bond levy for construction of a new educational complex. The college moved to its current location once construction was completed in 1969.

The Jackson County Center, which opened in 1975, is a smaller campus of WVU Parkersburg and offers a limited number of classes for students living closer to its Ripley, West Virginia location.

WVU Parkersburg's Downtown Center opened on Market Street in Parkersburg in January 2013 to serve the school's new Culinary Academy. The college has a workforce training lab and classroom at the Polymer Alliance Zone's Polymer Technology Park in Davisville, West Virginia. WVU Parkersburg also owns a small farm that is used for the Diversified Agriculture program.

== Academics ==
Undergraduate demographics as of Fall 2023
Race and ethnicity	Total
White	94%
Hispanic	2%
Two or more races	2%
Black	1%
International student	1%
Economic diversity
Low-income (Note: The percentage of students who received an income-based federal Pell grant intended for low-income students.)	46%
Affluent (Note: The percentage of students who are a part of the American middle class at the bare minimum.)	54%

WVU Parkersburg is the first and, thus far, only community college in West Virginia to offer any bachelor's degrees after becoming accredited to do so in 1991. Bachelor's degrees that are currently awarded at WVU Parkersburg include: the Bachelor of Applied Technology, Bachelor of Applied Science, Bachelor of Science in Business Administration, Bachelor of Arts, and the Regents Bachelor of Arts (RBA) degree, which gives adult students college credit for past work and life experience and allows them to gain a general college-level education without selecting a specific major.

WVU Parkersburg also offers associate degree and certificate programs, as community colleges traditionally do, in a wide variety of other academic areas which are not offered as baccalaureate programs. The vast majority of these associate degrees are Associates in Applied Sciences degrees, meaning they are non-transferable into four-year degree programs, and therefore not suitable for a student who seeks to continue their education beyond a two-year degree.

WVU Parkersburg is accredited by the Higher Learning Commission. Specific programs at the institution are also accredited by the Accreditation Commission for Education in Nursing (ACEN) and the National Council for Accreditation of Teacher Education (NCATE).

== Athletics ==
WVU Parkersburg does not currently field any of its own intercollegiate varsity teams. However, it does field several sport club teams that compete with other colleges, including men's basketball, women's basketball, volleyball, men's soccer, golf and table tennis. These teams are known as the Riverhawks, which refers to the Osprey that can be found on Blennerhassett Island near Parkersburg on the Ohio River. The Riverhawks name was voted upon by the student body during the Spring 2009 semester.

== Notable people ==
=== Faculty ===
- Bill Bell, adjunct faculty member, also an alum

=== Alumni ===
- Donna J. Boley, member of the West Virginia Senate
- Anna Border, member of the West Virginia House of Delegates
- Jessica Lynch, United States Army soldier
- David Nohe, member of the West Virginia Senate

== Gallery ==
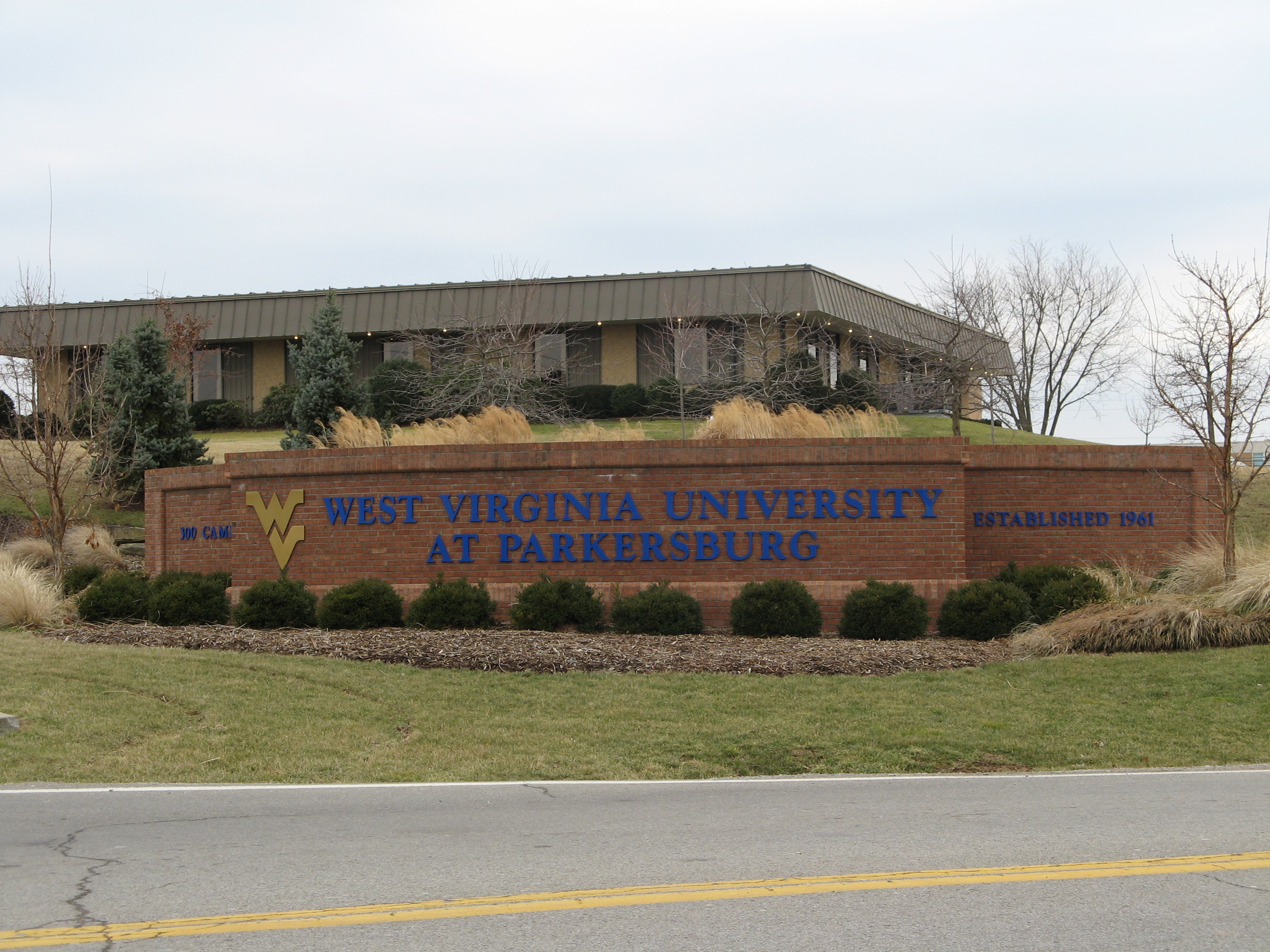
Entrance to WVU Parkersburg

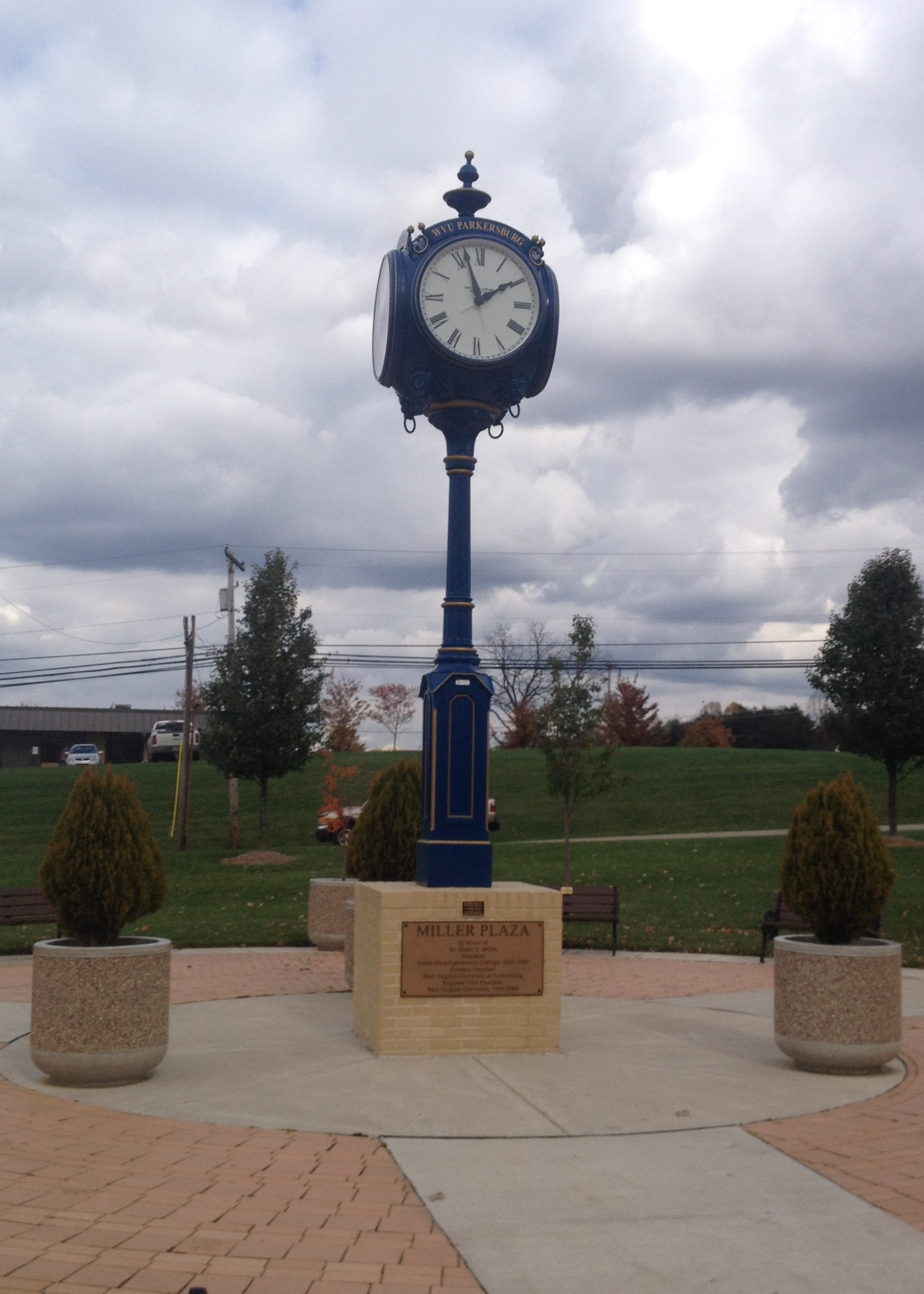
Memorial Clock (Eldon Miller Plaza) at WVU-P

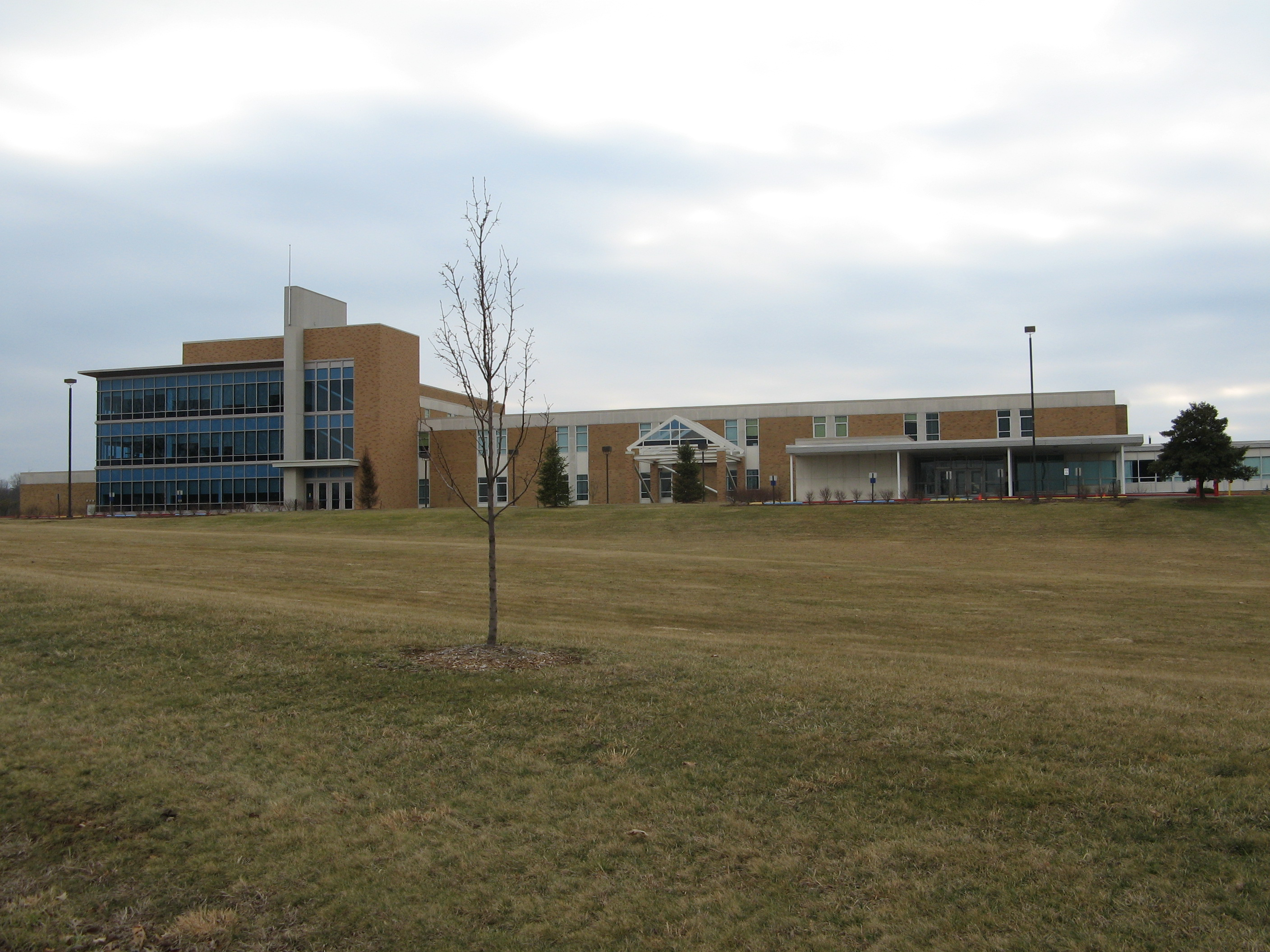
Main administrative building

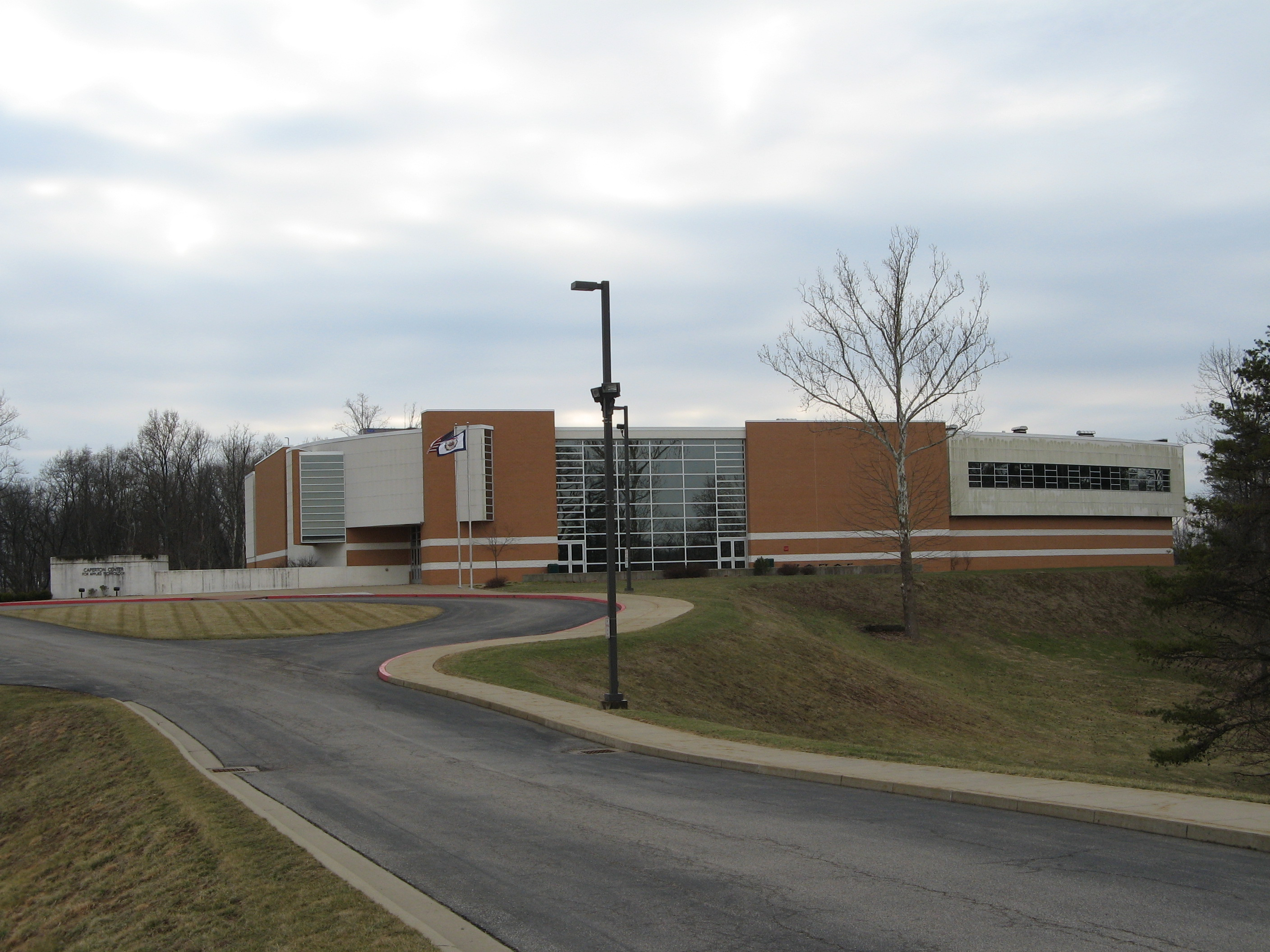
Caperton Center for Applied Technology
