= Cross Lanes, West Virginia =

- Census-designated place (CDP)
- Location in Kanawha County and state of West Virginia.
- Coordinates: 38°25′45″N 81°46′33″W
- Country: United States
- State: West Virginia
- County: Kanawha

Area
  - Total: 6.4 sq mi (16.6 km^{2})
  - Land: 6.4 sq mi (16.5 km^{2})
  - Water: 0.039 sq mi (0.1 km^{2})
- Elevation: 709 ft (216 m)

Population (2020)
  - Total: 9,727
  - Density: 1,530/sq mi (590/km^{2})
- Time zone: UTC-5 (Eastern (EST))
  - Summer (DST): UTC-4 (EDT)
- ZIP codes: 25313, 25356
- Area code: 304 681
- FIPS code: 54-19108
- GNIS feature ID: 1554227

Cross Lanes is a census-designated place (CDP) and suburb of Charleston in Kanawha County, West Virginia, United States. As of the 2020 census, its population was 9,727 (down from 9,995 at the 2010 census).

An EF2 tornado struck and heavily damaged the north side of town on April 2, 2024.

== Geography ==
Cross Lanes is a census-designated place in the suburbs of Charleston.

According to the United States Census Bureau, the Cross Lanes CDP has a total area of 6.4 square miles (17 km^{2}), of which 6.4 square miles (17 km^{2}) is land and 0.04 square miles (0.10 km^{2}) (0.65%) is water.

== Demographics ==
=== 2020 census ===
As of the 2020 census, Cross Lanes had a population of 9,727. The median age was 42.6 years. 20.0% of residents were under the age of 18 and 18.6% of residents were 65 years of age or older. For every 100 females there were 95.6 males, and for every 100 females age 18 and over there were 92.5 males age 18 and over.

94.3% of residents lived in urban areas, while 5.7% lived in rural areas.

There were 4,228 households in Cross Lanes, of which 25.6% had children under the age of 18 living in them. Of all households, 43.5% were married-couple households, 19.9% were households with a male householder and no spouse or partner present, and 28.8% were households with a female householder and no spouse or partner present. About 31.8% of all households were made up of individuals and 11.5% had someone living alone who was 65 years of age or older.

There were 4,626 housing units, of which 8.6% were vacant. The homeowner vacancy rate was 3.1% and the rental vacancy rate was 8.4%.

Racial composition as of the 2020 census
Race	Number	Percent
White	8,370	86.0%
Black or African American	630	6.5%
American Indian and Alaska Native	11	0.1%
Asian	107	1.1%
Native Hawaiian and Other Pacific Islander	1	0.0%
Some other race	108	1.1%
Two or more races	500	5.1%
Hispanic or Latino (of any race)	192	2.0%

=== 2010 Census ===
As of the census of 2010, there were 9,995 people, 4,053 households. The population density was 1,594.4 people per square mile (615.6 people/km^{2}). There were 4,481 housing units at an average density of 690.1 units per square mile (266.4 units/km^{2}). The racial makeup of the CDP was 93.63% White, 3.84% Black or African American, 0.21% Native American, 1.24% Asian, 0.02% Pacific Islander, 0.10% from other races, and 0.96% from two or more races. Hispanic or Latino of any race were 0.57% of the population.

There were 4,231 households, out of which 33.0% had children under the age of 18 living with them, 56.5% were married couples living together, 11.0% had a female householder with no husband present, and 29.3% were non-families. 25.2% of all households were made up of individuals, and 6.3% had someone living alone who was 65 years of age or older. The average household size was 2.44 and the average family size was 2.92.

The age distribution of the CDP is: 24.1% under the age of 18, 8.5% from 18 to 24, 31.4% from 25 to 44, 24.9% from 45 to 64, and 11.2% who were 65 years of age or older. The median age was 37 years. For every 100 females, there were 93.2 males. For every 100 females age 18 and over, there were 90.8 males.

The median income for a Cross Lanes household is $45,334, and the median income for a family was $54,649. Males had a median income of $40,758 versus $27,250 for females. The per capita income is $22,719. About 4.1% of families and 5.9% of the population were below the poverty line, including 8.1% of those under age 18 and 6.5% of those age 65 or over.

=== 2000 Census ===
As of the census of 2000, there were 10,353 people, 4,231 households, and 2,991 families residing in Cross Lanes. The population density was 1,594.4 people per square mile (615.6 people/km^{2}). There were 4,481 housing units at an average density of 690.1 units per square mile (266.4 units/km^{2}). The racial makeup of the CDP was 93.63% White, 3.84% Black or African American, 0.21% Native American, 1.24% Asian, 0.02% Pacific Islander, 0.10% from other races, and 0.96% from two or more races. Hispanic or Latino of any race were 0.57% of the population.

== Education ==
Cross Lanes is served by the following schools:

- Cross Lanes Elementary (K-5)
- Point Harmony Elementary (K-5)
- Andrew Jackson Middle (6–8)
- Cross Lanes Christian School (K-12)
- Nitro High School (9–12) — There is no public high school in Cross Lanes.
- West Virginia Junior College

== Notable people ==
- Pentecostal pastor and televangelist T. D. Jakes headed a church, the Greater Emmanuel Temple of Faith, in Cross Lanes, before moving to Dallas in 1996.
- Country singer/songwriter Kathy Mattea grew up in Cross Lanes before moving to Nashville, Tennessee to begin her professional career.
- American Chef, food writer, and television personality Bridget Lancaster. Co-host and executive producer for America's Test Kitchen and Cook's Country on American Public Television (PBS).
