= West Virginia Junior College =

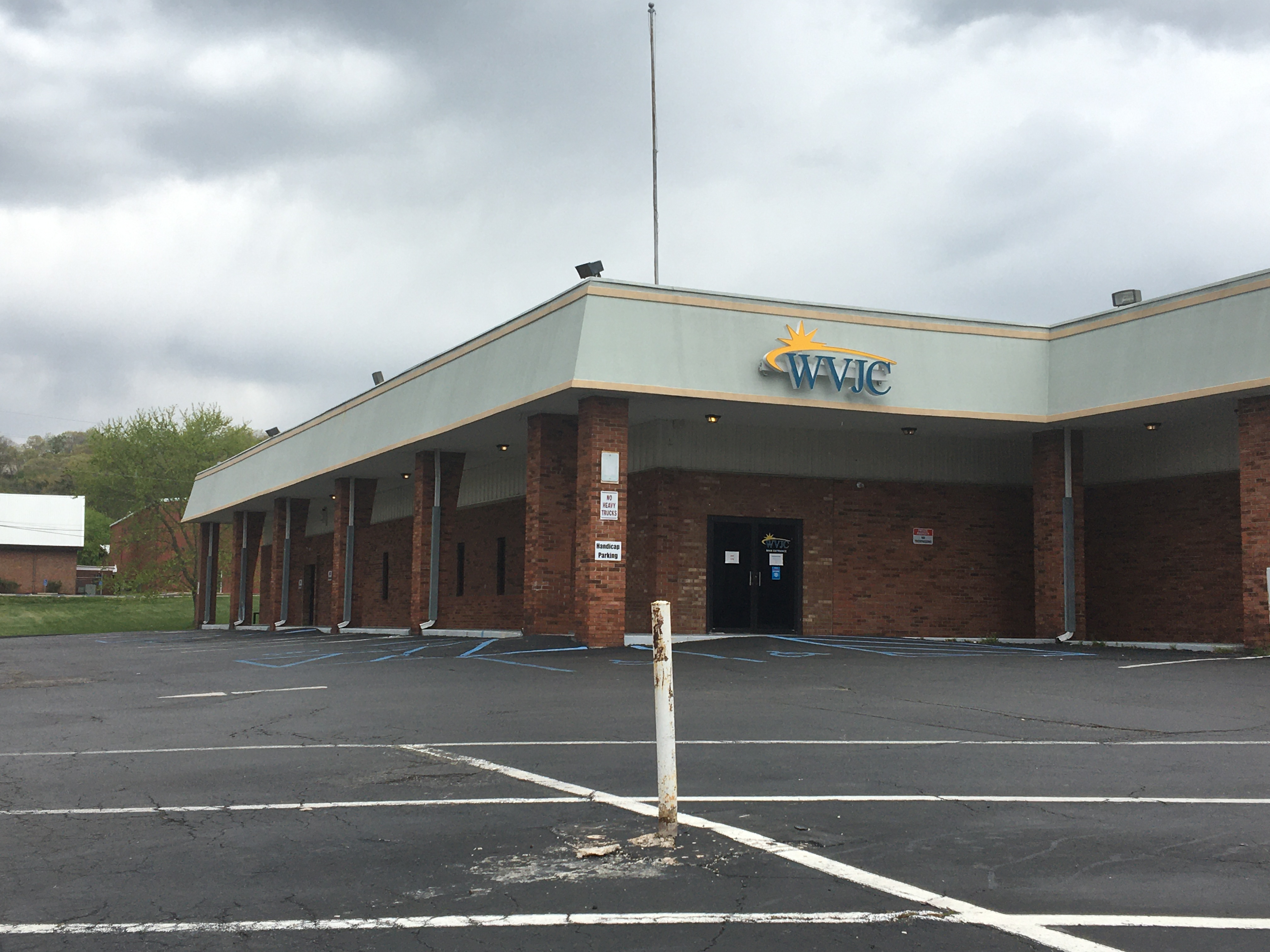
- Cross Lanes campus
- Type: Private junior college
- Established: 1892; 134 years ago
- Location: Cross Lanes, Bridgeport, and Morgantown, West Virginia, U.S.
- Website: www.wvjc.edu

West Virginia Junior College (WVJC) is a private junior college with its main campus in Charleston, West Virginia. It was founded in 1892 and offers associate degrees and diplomas in the healthcare and business fields. The institution has around 218 undergraduate students with a 100% acceptance rate. In this two-year institution, students can major in Medical Assistant, Network, Database, Business, and System Administration.

In 2011, WVJC added an online education platform for several of its programs.

== Locations ==
The school has campuses in Morgantown, Bridgeport, and in 2020 moved their Charleston campus to Cross Lanes.

== Accreditation and approvals ==
The college is accredited by the Accrediting Bureau of Health Education Schools. Its nursing program is approved by the West Virginia RN Board and the Practical Nursing program on the Bridgeport campus is approved by the West Virginia State Board of Examiners for Licensed Practical Nurses.
