= Ashton College =

Private college in Vancouver, Canada

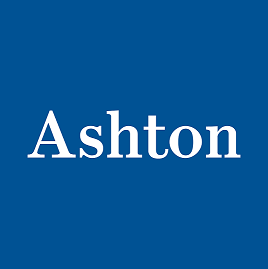
- Type: Private college
- Established: 1998
- President: Colin Fortes
- Location: Vancouver, British Columbia, Canada
- Colours: Blue; White
- Website: ashtoncollege.ca

Ashton College is a designated private, post-secondary educational institution, located in Vancouver in British Columbia, Canada. It was founded in 1998 as Ashton College Institute of Business, with a focus on business courses. Since then, the institution has simplified its name to Ashton College and expanded its offerings to include continuing professional development seminars, diplomas, certifications, and vocational training online. Ashton College also supports foreign professionals obtain licensing to practice in Canada.

== See also ==
- List of Colleges in British Columbia
- Higher education in British Columbia
