= BridgeValley Community and Technical College =

Multi-campus college in West Virginia, US

- Former names: Kanawha Valley Community and Technical College (South Charleston campus); Bridgemont Community and Technical College (Montgomery campus)
- Type: Public community college
- Established: 2014; 12 years ago
- Parent institution: West Virginia Community and Technical College System
- President: Casey K. Sacks
- Students: 2000+
- Location: South Charleston and Montgomery, West Virginia, United States
- Website: www.bridgevalley.edu

BridgeValley Community and Technical College (BVCTC) is a public community college with multiple campuses in West Virginia. It was formed in 2014 by the merger of Bridgemont Community and Technical College of Montgomery, West Virginia and Kanawha Valley Community and Technical College of South Charleston, West Virginia. The college is part of the West Virginia Community and Technical College System.

== History ==
=== South Charleston Campus ===
South Charleston Campus
- Former names: West Virginia State Community and Technical College; Kanawha Valley Community and Technical College
- Established: 1953
- Students: 2000
- Location: South Charleston, West Virginia

Located at 2001 Union Carbide Drive in South Charleston, BridgeValley occupies three buildings at the South Charleston Technology Park: Building 2000, the Advanced Technology Center (AKA Toyota Hall), and building 704.

The South Charleston campus, formerly Kanawha Valley Community and Technical College (KVCTC), was established in 1953 as a community college component of what was then West Virginia State College (now University). In 2003, it was accredited as West Virginia State Community and Technical College, but remained administratively linked to WVSU.

In 2008, the legislature fully separated the Community and Technical College from West Virginia State University, however, both schools continued to share the same campus. In the fall of 2012, KVCTC moved to its new campus in South Charleston at the site of the former Dow research facility.

In 2009, the school went through a name change to distinguish itself from West Virginia State University. The school's new name was officially announced on April 20, 2009 as Kanawha Valley Community and Technical College. KVCTC held its first commencement ceremony on May 16, 2009. Previously, Kanawha Valley held its commencement in a joint ceremony with West Virginia State. In May 2012, KVCTC received national recognition by earning the MAP-Works Overall Excellence Award for implementing a program aimed at student success.

=== Montgomery Campus ===
Montgomery Campus
- Former names: Community College at West Virginia Institute of Technology; Community College at West Virginia University Institute of Technology; Bridgemont Community and Technical College
- Established: 1966
- Students: 300
- Location: Montgomery, West Virginia

Located in Davis Hall at 619 2nd Avenue in Montgomery, the campus serves the upper Kanawha Valley region of West Virginia. It was established in 1966 as the Community College at West Virginia Institute of Technology.

In 1996, West Virginia Institute of Technology became a regional campus of West Virginia University and was renamed West Virginia University Institute of Technology. The community college became known as Community College at West Virginia University Institute of Technology.

As a result of the 2008 reorganization of the higher education system of West Virginia, the state's community colleges were separated from the four-year colleges and universities and adopted new names unrelated to their parent institutions. Community College at West Virginia University Institute of Technology became Bridgemont Community and Technical College as a nod to the many bridges and mountains in the area.

=== Merger ===
In early 2013, a bill was in process to merge Bridgemont Community and Technical College with Kanawha Valley Community and Technical College. The schools combined their administrations, but maintained both campuses and all course offerings. According to former KVCTC President Joseph Badgley, "This is a model that should have been a place a long time ago, ... This is a good time to do it to since I’m retiring and it will make the transition much easier." Then-Bridgemont President Beverly Jo Harris said "We have worked hand in hand [with KVCTC] over the past several years trying not to duplicate programs, ... Now under one administrative structure, we’ll have a very broad range of healthcare and technology programming."

Over the 2013-14 academic year, the schools operated independently. In the fall of 2014, the combined schools became officially known as BridgeValley Community and Technical College. Harris was named president of the new multi-campus college.

== Academics ==
The college grants more than 22 associate degrees and 17 certificates. The college began its first associate degree in nursing in the fall of 2005 and now produces more nurses for the Kanawha Valley than any other education provider.

It is accredited by the Higher Learning Commission. The nursing program is accredited by the National League for Nursing Accrediting Commission and approved by the West Virginia Board of Examiners for Registered Professional Nurses.
