= New River Community and Technical College =

College in Beaver, West Virginia, U.S.

Coordinates: 37°46′2.8″N 81°8′8.8″W

- Type: Public community college
- Established: 2003; 23 years ago
- Parent institution: West Virginia Community and Technical College System
- President: Bonny Copenhaver
- Location: Beaver, West Virginia, United States
- Website: www.newriver.edu

New River Community and Technical College (New River) is a public community college in Beaver, West Virginia. It was founded in 2003 and is West Virginia's newest college. The college was independently accredited in 2005 by the Higher Learning Commission. Although newly founded and named, the college's origins span more than one hundred thirty years of service to West Virginia through its two parent institutions, Bluefield State College and Glenville State College.

== History ==
New River was created by combining the community and technical college component of Bluefield State College with Glenville State College's community and technical college campus in Nicholas County (Summersville), as mandated by HB 2224 and later refined by SB 448. Consequently, New River serves an area including Fayette, Greenbrier, Mercer, Monroe, Nicholas, Pocahontas, Raleigh, Summers, and Webster Counties.

There are currently 4 campuses:

- Beaver - Main Campus, also houses Central Administration
- Princeton
- Lewisburg
- Summersville

Additionally, New River CTC has an Advanced Technology Center in Ghent, West Virginia and a One Room University in Marlinton, West Virginia.

== Academics ==
New River offers ten Associate in Applied Science (A.A.S.) degree programs, thirteen Associate in Science (A.S.) degree programs, two Associate of Fine Arts (A.F.A.) degrees, Collegiate Certificates, and Collegiate Skill Set Certificates. A number of the A.S. degree programs articulated with and transfer to four-year baccalaureate programs at Bluefield State and Glenville State Colleges, as well as other state-supported institutions.

The college's four campus facilities have Interactive Video Network (IVN) videoconferencing technologies through its distance learning network and through web-based instruction. In addition to the Raleigh County Campus in Beaver, a full range of community college programs and services are offered at the Greenbrier Valley Campus (located in Lewisburg), at the Nicholas County Campus (located in Summersville), and at the Advanced Technology Center (located in Ghent).

The college's Center for Workforce and Business Development offers a variety of customized training and workforce development programs that address the training needs of employers within the college's designated service district. During the past decade, programs and training have been provided that impact more than 7,000 employees from more than sixty companies. Additionally, in partnership with local vocational centers, the Region 1 Workforce Investment Board, and other educational partners, New River designs customized certificate programs that emphasize industries and skills in which participants can obtain employment quickly and help to alleviate workforce shortages in critical industries that are targeted for growth and economic impact. These programs are designed specifically for adults with little or no postsecondary education, thus increasing adult access to higher education while providing training that is immediately relevant to the adult's employment goal.
