= Pierpont Community and Technical College =

Public college in Fairmont, West Virginia, US

Coordinates: 39°25′55″N 80°11′31″W

Pierpont Community & Technical College
- Type: Public community college
- Established: 1974; 52 years ago
- Parent institution: West Virginia Community and Technical College System
- Accreditation: Higher Learning Commission
- President: Michael Waide
- Provost: David Beighly
- Administrative staff: 259
- Students: 2.780
- Location: Fairmont, West Virginia, United States
- Campus: Urban, 120 acres (49 ha)
- Colors: Black and Gold
- Mascot: Montgomery the Lion
- Website: www.pierpont.edu

Pierpont Community & Technical College (Pierpont) is a public community college in Fairmont, West Virginia. Founded in 1974, it has the second largest enrollment of the community and technical colleges that make up the West Virginia Community and Technical College System. The college serves 13 counties in North Central West Virginia (Barbour, Braxton, Calhoun, Doddridge, Gilmer, Harrison, Lewis, Marion, Monongalia, Preston, Randolph, Taylor and Upshur) with classes offered at more than 15 locations throughout the region. Its headquarters is located in Fairmont, West Virginia. The student/faculty ratio is 17:1.

Pierpont is part of the state's growing high technology corridor with a metro area of about 50,000 residents. With an enrollment of more than 3,000, Pierpont offers more than 40 associate degree programs, skill sets and one-year certificates. It specializes in preparing students in two years or less for practical hands-on careers and provides non-credit enrichment courses for individuals and customized workplace trainings for local employers.

== History ==
The college was first formed in 1974 as Fairmont State Community & Technical College; it was originally a component of Fairmont State College. In 2006, it was renamed Pierpont Community & Technical College after Francis H. Pierpont and it became a division of Fairmont State University. The following year, it became independent and was placed under the direction of its own board of governors.

== Campus ==
Pierpont is headquartered at the Advanced Technology Center (ATC) main campus at the I-79 Technology Park in Fairmont, West Virginia. Fairmont, the seat of government for Marion County, is located approximately 90 miles south of Pittsburgh, Pennsylvania and has a population of about 19,000.

Pierpont offers a variety of courses at more than 15 sites in North Central West Virginia, including the Braxton County Center in Flatwoods, West Virginia and the Lewis County Center in Weston, West Virginia. Through its Center for Workforce Education, the college provides workforce training and community education for its 13-county region. Pierpont operates the Robert C. Byrd National Aerospace Education Center in Bridgeport, West Virginia which offers programs in flight and aviation maintenance. It also offers classes at the Gaston Caperton Center, a satellite campus in Clarksburg, West Virginia.

In 2026, Pierpont entered the design phase for a new Aviation Maintenance Training Center at the North Central West Virginia Airport. The planned facility is intended to expand the college's aviation maintenance program and will include laboratories, classrooms, testing spaces and training areas designed to meet Federal Aviation Administration Part 147 standards. Pierpont reported that the project would increase the aviation program's enrollment capacity from approximately 130 students to about 230.

Pierpont officially opened the ATC on October 31, 2016. The ATC is a 55,000+ square foot facility housing such Pierpont programs as IT/CyberSecurity, Petroleum Technology, Power Plant Technology, Advanced Manufacturing, Electrical Utility Technology, Health Information Technology, Medical Laboratory Technology, and Respiratory Care.
