= West Virginia Northern Community College =

Public college in Wheeling, West Virginia, US

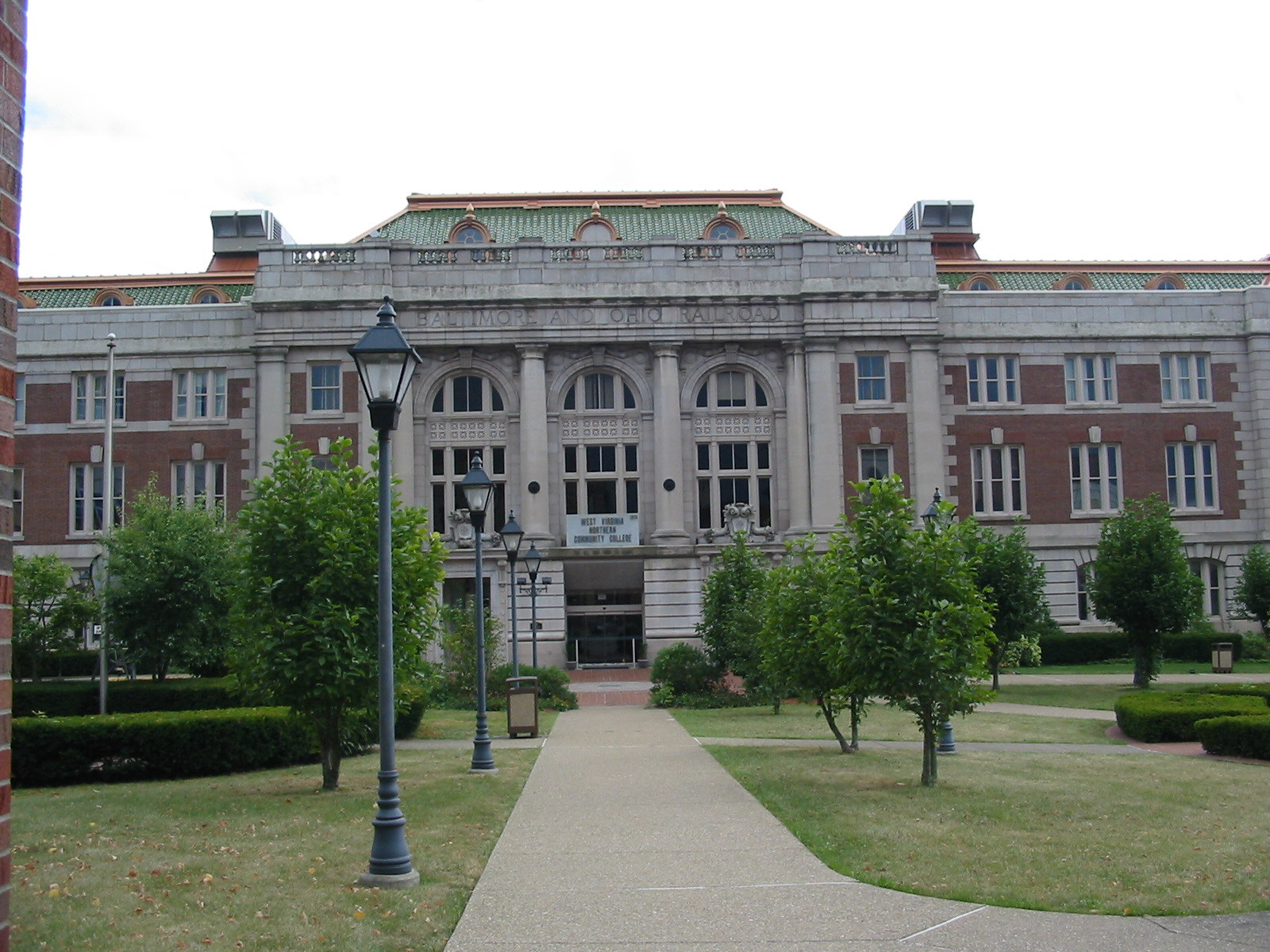
- West Virginia Northern Community College main campus in downtown Wheeling
- Former names: West Liberty State College's Hancock County Branch and Wheeling Campus
- Type: Public community college
- Established: May 9, 1972; 54 years ago
- Parent institution: West Virginia Community and Technical College System
- Budget: $7,285,825 of state funding
- Chairperson: David Artman
- President: Daniel Mosser
- Provost: Jill Loveless
- Students: 1,650
- Location: Wheeling, Weirton, and New Martinsville, West Virginia, U.S. 40°03′48″N 80°43′17″W
- Colors: Red, black, and gray
- Mascot: Thundering Chicken
- Website: www.wvncc.edu

West Virginia Northern Community College (WVNCC) is a public community college with its main campus in downtown Wheeling, West Virginia. Established in 1972, WVNCC serves all six counties in West Virginia's Northern Panhandle. It is part of the West Virginia Community and Technical College System.

The main campus is housed in the former Baltimore & Ohio Railroad Terminal at Wheeling. It also has branch campuses in Weirton, West Virginia and in New Martinsville, West Virginia.

== Academics ==
West Virginia Northern Community College offers the Associate of Science (A.S.), Associate in Arts (A.A.), and Associate in Applied Science (A.A.S.) degree. Additionally, it also offers the Certificate of Applied Science (C.A.S.).
