= Montgomery, West Virginia =

City in West Virginia, US

City of Montgomery
- City
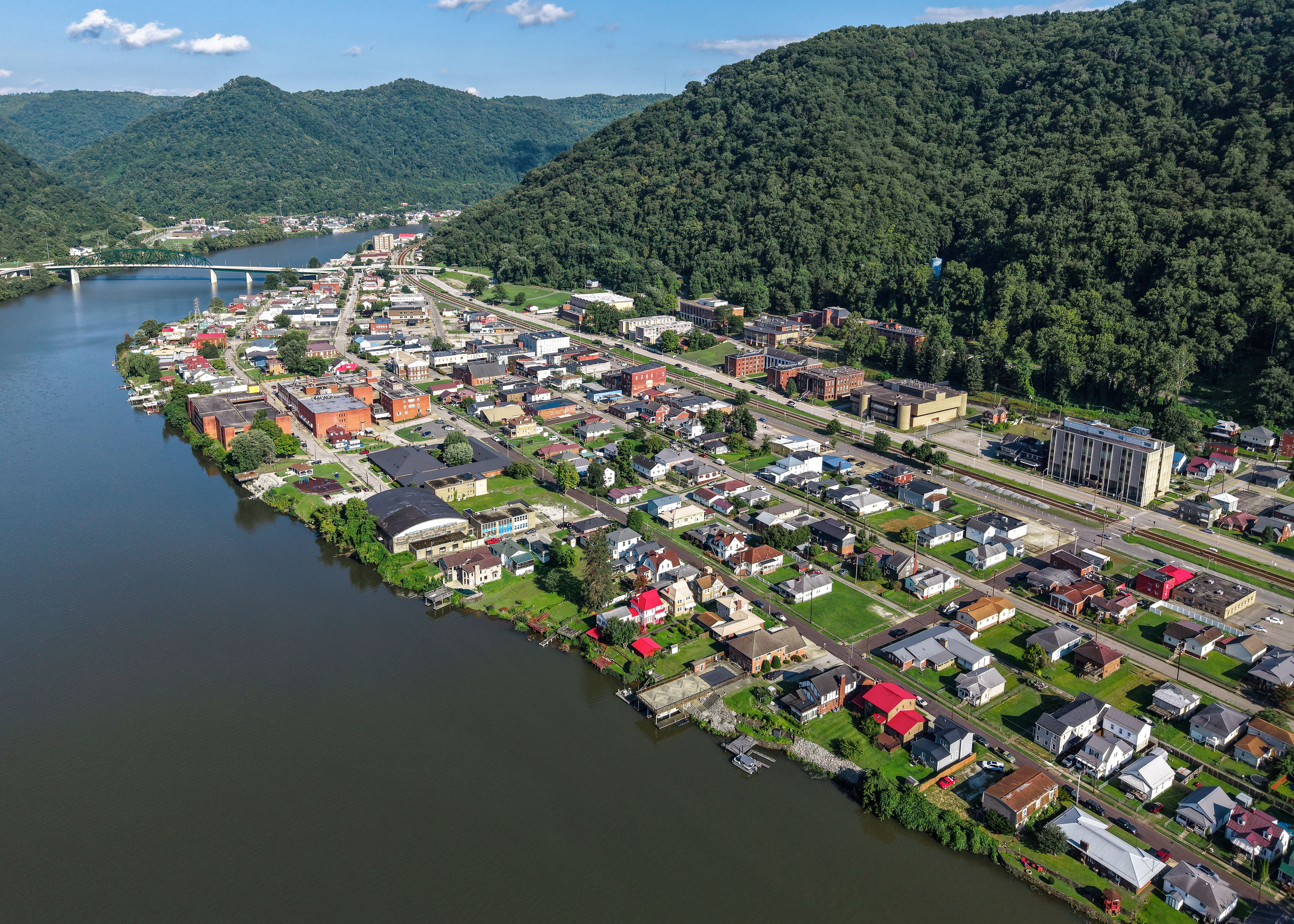
- Aerial view (2026)

- Flag Seal Logo

- Location of Montgomery in Fayette County, West Virginia

- Location within the state of West Virginia City of Montgomery (the United States)
- Coordinates: 38°10′48″N 81°19′36″W
- Country: United States
- State: West Virginia
- County: Fayette, Kanawha

Government
  - Mayor: Greg Ingram, elected 2020

Area
  - Total: 1.75 sq mi (4.53 km^{2})
  - Land: 1.60 sq mi (4.14 km^{2})
  - Water: 0.15 sq mi (0.39 km^{2})
- Elevation: 636 ft (194 m)

Population (2020)
  - Total: 1,275
  - Estimate (2021): 1,257
  - Density: 942.4/sq mi (363.88/km^{2})
- Time zone: UTC-5 (Eastern (EST))
  - Summer (DST): UTC-4 (EDT)
- ZIP code: 25136
- Area code: 304
- FIPS code: 54-55468
- GNIS feature ID: 1555154
- Website: montgomery.wv.gov

Montgomery is a city in West Virginia, United States, along the Kanawha River. Most of the city is in Fayette County, with the remainder in Kanawha County. The population was 1,280 at the 2020 census.

== History ==
From 1876 to 1890, the town was called Coal Valley Post Office. The name then changed to Montgomery's Landing, then to Coal Valley. In 1890 it was again renamed, as Cannelton. It was incorporated on April 1, 1891, and the name Montgomery was settled upon; it was named for James C. Montgomery, one of the city's first settlers. The land was given to James Montgomery as a wedding present from his grandfather-in-law, Levi Morris, who owned all the land.

The town's late-19th century growth was due to the construction of the Kanawha & Michigan Railroad across the river and the connection of the Virginian Railway at nearby Deepwater. In the early 1910s, Montgomery was the shipping center for 26 different coal operations and was the largest town in Fayette County at the time.

From 1895 until its 2017 move to Beckley, Montgomery was the home of West Virginia University Institute of Technology, popularly called WVU Tech. The city is currently home to BridgeValley Community and Technical College – Montgomery Campus.

== Geography ==
According to the United States Census Bureau, the city has a total area of 1.59 square miles (4.12 km^{2}), of which 1.57 square miles (4.07 km^{2}) is land and 0.02 square miles (0.05 km^{2}) is water.

== Demographics ==
Historical population
Census	Pop.	Note	%±
1900	1,594		—
1910	1,886		18.3%
1920	2,130		12.9%
1930	2,906		36.4%
1940	3,231		11.2%
1950	3,484		7.8%
1960	3,000		−13.9%
1970	2,525		−15.8%
1980	3,104		22.9%
1990	2,449		−21.1%
2000	1,942		−20.7%
2010	1,638		−15.7%
2020	1,275		−22.2%
2021 (est.)	1,257		−1.4%
U.S. Decennial Census

=== 2020 census ===
As of the 2020 census, Montgomery had a population of 1,275. The median age was 48.3 years. 16.4% of residents were under the age of 18 and 27.0% of residents were 65 years of age or older. For every 100 females there were 87.5 males, and for every 100 females age 18 and over there were 82.8 males age 18 and over.

0.0% of residents lived in urban areas, while 100.0% lived in rural areas.

There were 568 households in Montgomery, of which 24.8% had children under the age of 18 living in them. Of all households, 26.1% were married-couple households, 27.5% were households with a male householder and no spouse or partner present, and 38.2% were households with a female householder and no spouse or partner present. About 45.1% of all households were made up of individuals and 19.3% had someone living alone who was 65 years of age or older.

There were 793 housing units, of which 28.4% were vacant. The homeowner vacancy rate was 8.9% and the rental vacancy rate was 13.9%.

Racial composition as of the 2020 census
Race	Number	Percent
White	960	75.3%
Black or African American	183	14.4%
American Indian and Alaska Native	4	0.3%
Asian	22	1.7%
Native Hawaiian and Other Pacific Islander	0	0.0%
Some other race	20	1.6%
Two or more races	86	6.7%
Hispanic or Latino (of any race)	23	1.8%

=== 2010 census ===
As of the census of 2010, there were 1,638 people, 645 households, and 302 families living in the city. The population density was 1,043.3 inhabitants per square mile (402.8/km^{2}). There were 838 housing units at an average density of 533.8 units per square mile (206.1 units/km^{2}). The racial makeup of the city was 78.3% White, 17.4% African American, 0.5% Asian, 0.1% Pacific Islander, 0.9% from other races, and 2.8% from two or more races. Hispanic or Latino of any race were 1.8% of the population.

There were 645 households, of which 20.2% had children under the age of 18 living with them, 26.0% were married couples living together, 16.1% had a female householder with no husband present, 4.7% had a male householder with no wife present, and 53.2% were non-families. 43.7% of all households were made up of individuals, and 17.2% had someone living alone who was 65 years of age or older. The average household size was 1.97 and the average family size was 2.71.

The median age in the city was 30.1 years. 12.8% of residents were under the age of 18; 31.5% were between the ages of 18 and 24; 17.2% were from 25 to 44; 22.5% were from 45 to 64; and 16.1% were 65 years of age or older. The gender makeup of the city was 53.3% male and 46.7% female.

=== 2000 census ===
As of the census of 2000, there were 1,942 people, 725 households, and 326 families living in the city. The population density was 1,237.5 people per square mile (477.8 people/km^{2}). There were 869 housing units at an average density of 553.7 units per square mile (213.8 units/km^{2}). The racial makeup of the city was 76.47% White, 17.40% African American, 0.31% Native American, 3.76% Asian, 0.10% Pacific Islander, 0.46% from other races, and 1.49% from two or more races. Hispanics or Latinos of any race were 0.62% of the population.

There were 725 households, out of which 17.9% had children under the age of 18 living with them, 28.6% were married couples living together, 13.7% had a female householder with no husband present, and 54.9% were non-families. 42.2% of all households were made up of individuals, and 17.8% had someone living alone who was 65 years of age or older. The average household size was 2.03 and the average family size was 2.80.

The age distribution, which is strongly influenced by the presence of WVU Tech, is: 13.2% under the age of 18, 33.0% from 18 to 24, 17.9% from 25 to 44, 17.0% from 45 to 64, and 18.8% who were 65 years of age or older. The median age was 28 years. For every 100 females, there were 107.9 males. For every 100 females age 18 and over, there were 111.3 males.

The median income for a household in the city was $20,606, and the median income for a family was $32,000. Males had a median income of $27,794 versus $25,139 for females. The per capita income for the city was $12,663. About 25.7% of families and 37.1% of the population were below the poverty line, including 50.4% of those under age 18 and 13.7% of those age 65 or over.

== Infrastructure ==
=== Transportation ===
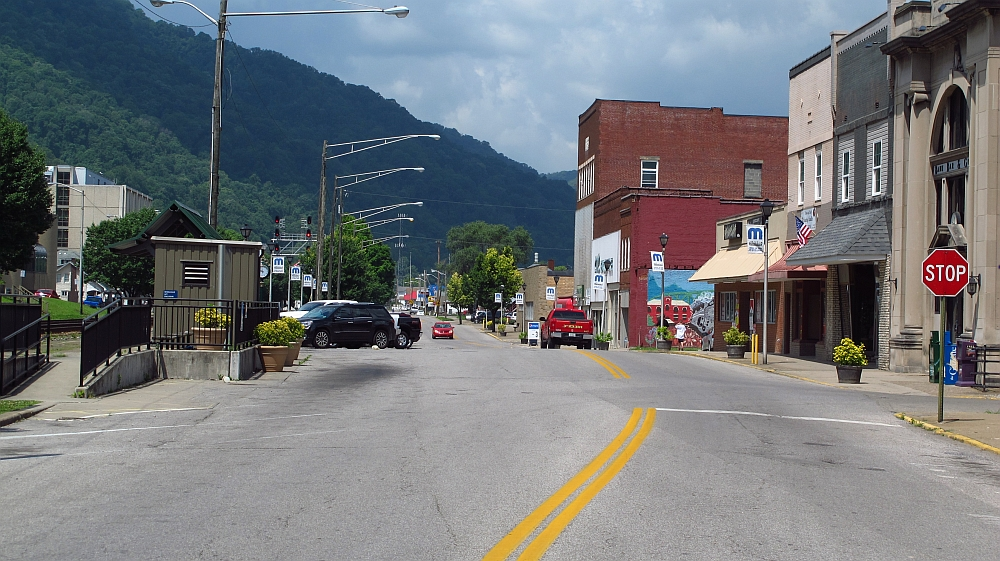
Third Avenue in Montgomery. The Montgomery Amtrak station is on the left.

The Chesapeake & Ohio Railway stopped in Montgomery until 1971. Amtrak, the national passenger rail service, provides service to Montgomery on the Cardinal route. CSX transportation's Kanawha Subdivision also services Montgomery.

US Route 60 passes through Montgomery.

Kanawha Valley Regional Transportation Authority bus 22M runs from Montgomery to Charleston.

== In popular culture ==
The novel Goodbye Miss 4th of July by Christopher Janus is a biographical story of the author's Greek family's struggles while growing up in Montgomery. In 1988, a film version of Goodbye Miss 4th of July was produced by the Disney Channel.
