= Southern West Virginia Community and Technical College =

Multi-campus college in West Virginia, US

- Other name: Southern
- Former names: Marshall University branch college in Williamson and Logan
- Type: Public community college
- Established: July 1, 1971; 55 years ago
- Parent institution: West Virginia Community and Technical College System
- President: Pamela L. Alderman
- Academic staff: 83
- Undergraduates: 1,118
- Location: Mount Gay, West Virginia, United States; 37.675433°N 82.293189°W
- Campus: Rural
- Website: www.southernwv.edu

Southern West Virginia Community and Technical College (Southern) is a public community college with its main campus in Mount Gay, West Virginia. It is part of the West Virginia Community and Technical College System.

== History ==
The school was founded as the Logan and Williamson branches of Marshall College in 1960 and renamed as branches of Marshall University when their mother institution achieved university status in 1961. It had community college jurisdiction over Logan and Mingo counties. In both cases, the schools were housed in the buildings that had been surplussed by the desegregation of public education. The "branch college", as it was often called, sported basketball teams at each of its two campuses.

In 1970, the two branches were merged and became a stand-alone community college. The college's jurisdiction was expanded to include Boone County and Wyoming County. Classes in these counties were held in leased locations until 1971, when a permanent building was constructed in Williamson.

In the 1980s, the college was refocused and permanent buildings were built in each county.

== Academics ==
Southern provides both associate degrees in 2-year fields (career/technical programs) and the first two years of a four-year degree in the anticipation of a transfer to a bachelor's level institution.

The service area of the school was expanded by 1995 legislation that divided West Virginia into eleven districts. Southern serves all of Boone, Lincoln, Logan, McDowell, Mingo, and Wyoming counties.

As of 2023, approximately 1,100 students are enrolled at the college and thirty-seven percent are part-time students. Less than half of the students who enrolled in Fall of 2022 returned the following fall; 19 percent graduated and did not return the following fall, while 32 percent simply did not return.

The school has no residential programs and no athletics. In 2021, new college president Pam Alderman changed the school colors from gold and black to a light blue. In 2022, Alderman created the school's first mascot Bestfoot, which was reported as a choice by students.

== Locations ==
Prior to the early 2020s, Southern campuses were located in Mount Gay, Williamson, Foster, and Saulsville, with a site in Hamlin. However, as of 2024, new college president President Pam Alderman chose to close the Wyoming Campus and offered the building for sale. Another campus was lost later in 2024 when the Boone County Board of Education ejected Southern from its shared building.

== Notable faculty ==
- Joanne Tomblin, former president of Southern West Virginia Community and Technical College (1999-2015)
