= Mountwest Community and Technical College =

Public college in Huntington, West Virginia, US

Coordinates: 38°25′30″N 82°25′14″W

- Former names: Marshall Community and Technical College
- Type: Public community college
- Established: 2008; 18 years ago
- Parent institution: West Virginia Community and Technical College System
- President: Joshua Baker
- Location: Huntington, West Virginia, United States
- Website: www.mctc.edu

Mountwest Community and Technical College (MCTC) is a public community college in Huntington, West Virginia. It is part of the West Virginia Community and Technical College System. The college offers associate degree programs including several career courses in maritime through its Inland Waterways Academy.

The institution evolved from community college programs of Marshall University. In 2008, the state decided that community colleges and state colleges should be separated into different institutions, and the constituent college was "divorced" from the university. Under an agreement between the two schools, MCTC was permitted to use its original Marshall Community and Technical College name until 2011, at which time it had to adopt a new name that does not use the Marshall trademark. The new Mountwest name was announced in November 2009.

In 2012, the school stopped leasing space at Marshall and purchased a former office building from Ashland Incorporated.
