= Blue Ridge Community and Technical College =

College in Martinsburg, West Virginia

Coordinates: 39°26′7.2″N 78°0′6.8″W

- Motto: Transforming lives through the power of learning
- Type: Public
- Established: 2005
- Address: 13650 Apple Harvest Dr, Martinsburg, West Virginia 25403, United States
- Website: www.blueridgectc.edu

Blue Ridge Community and Technical College is a public community college in Martinsburg, West Virginia.

== History ==
Starting in 1989, the Community and Technical College of Shepherd, was part of Shepherd College until March 2005, when it was accredited as an independent institution. One year later, it was officially renamed Blue Ridge Community and Technical College.
