= History of libraries in West Virginia =

Libraries have been in West Virginia for much of its history as a state. Starting with subscription libraries, the early 19th century saw the beginning of libraries formed in many of the large towns. Three Carnegie libraries were built in the state at the beginning of the 20th century.

With the pressure of the West Virginia Library Association, the state established the West Virginia Library Commission in 1929, which would, starting in the 1950s, facilitate the growth of public libraries in the state. As of 2009, West Virginia's public library system consisted of 97 library systems serving citizens from 175 physical facilities and seven bookmobiles.

== First public libraries ==
The first libraries in West Virginia were subscription-based libraries in which members would pay for the privilege of borrowing books. When West Virginia was still a part of the state of Virginia, first libraries included Buffalo Creek Farmer's Library of present-day Monongalia County, Wheeling, and Morgantown and were all established around 1813. By 1826, the towns of Romney, Harpers Ferry, Lewisburg, and Martinsburg also had libraries. The counties of Pendleton and Jefferson had libraries by the 1850s. The first real public library in the state was created in 1859 as a library company in the town of Wheeling that was chartered by the state of Virginia. In 1883, it became the Wheeling Public Library and was under the control of the Board of Education and is considered the only real public library in the state prior to 1900.

== Carnegie libraries in West Virginia ==
Several libraries were also built in West Virginia with funding provided by philanthropist Andrew Carnegie. The three Carnegie libraries were in Huntington (built in 1903), Parkersburg, and Hinton (built in 1924). Eventually the library in Huntington became the home of Huntington Junior College in 1980 when the present day Cabell County Public Library was built directly across the street. The Carnegie library in Parkersburg closed in 1976 when a new library was built and is now the largest bookstore in West Virginia, Trans Allegheny Books which opened to the public in December 1985. The Carnegie library in Hinton now houses the Veterans Memorial Museum.

== Early 20th-century struggles ==
"In 1915, the legislature passed a bill 'to empower cities and towns to levy taxes for the purpose of establishing and maintaining public libraries and reading rooms'". The newly formed West Virginia Library Association (formed in 1914) campaigned for the legislation. Between 1917 and 1930, fourteen public libraries existed in the state. The West Virginia Library Commission was created in 1929 by the legislature and housed in Morgantown on the campus of West Virginia University, but no state funding was provided. Throughout the early 1930s, library development remained stagnant in the state. It was not until the State Federation of Women's Clubs hired two consultants, Paul A. T. Noon and Mildred W. Sandoe, to study library development in the state. They completed a report in 1938 and found that 88 percent of West Virginians were without library services. This gave them the statistics needed to recommend substantial funding from the state legislature. Finally, in 1941 the first funds were allocated.

== Beginnings of modern public libraries in West Virginia ==
In 1952, a regional library system was created and the West Virginia Library Commission moved into its current location in Charleston, the state capitol. When the Library Services Act was passed by Congress in 1956, the West Virginia Library Commission was able to acquire federal funding for libraries in the state. The commission then hired consultant Ralph Blasin to develop a report with recommendations to improving library service. The report was completed in 1965 and by late 1966, the commission created a plan for implementing Blasin's suggestions which included "development of service center libraries and a system of direct service via bookmobiles". Bookmobiles were vital to reaching citizens in rural parts of West Virginia's southern counties.

== Growth, change, and the present day ==
In 1964 and 1965, the federal Library Services Act was amended to provide funding for library education and library construction. During 1965 to 1976, 53 public libraries were built in West Virginia using federal, state, and local funds exceeding $17 million. In 1969, state legislation passed to allow the Library Commission to "make direct grants for operating expenses to libraries complying with its administrative rules". By 1972, nearly 80 percent of the state's population had library service in some form.

Frederic J. Glazer was also hired as an executive secretary for the Library Commission in 1972 directly because of increased state support and better federal funding. Glazer was instrumental in developing promotional programs for public libraries and for increasing state funding for libraries from less than ten cents to almost four dollars by 1996. In 1996, a controversial decision was made by the Library Commission to fire Glazer from his position as executive secretary.

In 1973, the Library Commission and Marshall University established a program to train library staff who were working in small, remote libraries which still exists in part. In the 1980s the Library Commission entered into a contract with Virginia Polytechnic Institute to provide a statewide automation network called VTLS which replaced the former card catalogs with electronic ones. This system has continued to grow and develop over the years which is why it is still in use by most public libraries in the state today.

After the controversy over the firing of Frederic J. Glazer, several executive secretaries followed: Dave Childers who served as interim executive secretary, David Price (hired in 1997, resigned in 2001), and J.D. Waggoner who was hired from within the agency in 2002.

As of 2009, West Virginia's public library system consisted of 97 library systems serving citizens from 175 physical facilities and seven bookmobiles. Each of West Virginia's 55 counties has at least one public library and every public library in the state has internet access. There were over 5,212,807 items in print, 216,782 audio resources, 252,890 video resources, and 1,613 electronic databases. Patron statistics include the use of 1,280 computer terminals accessed by patrons a total of 1,620,140 times and 7,731,735 materials of all types were circulated. There were also approximately 6,081,791 library visits.

== See also ==
- List of libraries in West Virginia
