= List of libraries in West Virginia =

List of libraries in the U.S. state of West Virginia

This is a list of public, private, and academic libraries in the U.S. state of West Virginia.

== Current Libraries ==
| Library name | Image | Location | County | Est. | Type | System | Consortium (Note: West Virginia library consortia include the Eastern Library Network (ELN), Kanawha County Library System (KCLS), Mountain Library Network (MLN), the Western Counties Regional Library Network (WCRLN), the West Virginia Electronic Resources Consortium (WVER), the West Virginia Library Network (WVLN), and West Virginia LibShare (WVLS). Libraries not affiliated with the state's consortia are listed as unaffiliated.) | Notes |
|---|---|---|---|---|---|---|---|---|
| Alderson Public Library | | Alderson; 37°43′39″N 80°38′15″W | Greenbrier | 1977 | Public | None | MLN, WVLN | |
| Allegheny Mountain Top Public Library | | Mount Storm; 39°16′28″N 79°14′25″W | Grant | 1978 | Public | Grant County Public Library | ELN | |
| Alum Creek Public Library | | Alum Creek; 38°15′39″N 81°50′07″W | Lincoln | 1982 | Public | Hamlin–Lincoln County Public Library | WCRLN | |
| Ansted Public Library | | Ansted; 38°08′04″N 81°05′52″W | Fayette | 1976 | Public | Fayette County Public Library | MLN, WVLN | |
| Arnettsville Public Library | | Arnettsville; 39°35′16″N 80°05′30″W | Monongalia | 2009 | Public | Morgantown Public Library | WVLN | |
| Barboursville Public Library | | Barboursville; 38°24′25″N 82°17′41″W | Cabell | 1946 | Public | Cabell County Public Library | WCRLN | The current building was opened on May 12, 2022, and is the first library in the state to have geothermal heating and cooling. |
| Barrett–Wharton Public Library | | Barrett; 37°53′03″N 81°39′36″W | Boone | 1977 | Public | Boone–Madison Public Library | MLN, WVLN | |
| Belington Public Library | | Belington; 39°01′25″N 79°56′08″W | Barbour | 1977 | Public | None | WVLN | Originally opened in Belington City Hall by the Belington Federated Women's Club and the Belington Kiwanis Club, the library relocated to its current building in 1980. |
| Benwood–McMechen Public Library | | McMechen; 39°59′39″N 80°43′48″W | Marshall | | Public | Moundsville–Marshall County Public Library | WVLN | |
| Bethany College – T. W. Phillips Memorial Library | | Bethany; 40°12′22″N 80°33′36″W | Brooke | | Academic | Bethany College, Mary Cutlip Center for Library and Information Technology Services | WVER | |
| Beverly Heritage Branch Library | A white brick building on a street corner. | Beverly; 38°50′26″N 79°52′31″W | Randolph | | Public | None | | Co-located in the Beverly Bank building with the Beverly Heritage Center. |
| Bluefield State University – William B. Robertson Library | | Bluefield; 37°16′02″N 81°14′15″W | Mercer | | Academic | Bluefield State University | MLN, WVER, WVLN | |
| Bolivar–Harpers Ferry Public Library | | Bolivar; 39°19′28″N 77°45′24″W | Jefferson | 1977 | Public | None | ELN | |
| Boone–Madison Public Library | A gray neoclassical building. | Madison; 38°03′51″N 81°49′20″W | Boone | 1974 | Public | Boone–Madison Public Library | MLN, WVLN | Currently housed in the former Madison National Bank building. |
| Bradshaw Public Library | | Bradshaw; 37°21′08″N 81°47′58″W | McDowell | | Public | McDowell County Public Library | MLN, WVLN | |
| Bridgeport Public Library | | Bridgeport; 39°17′59″N 80°16′31″W | Harrison | 1956 | Public | None | WVLS | The library was established with a donation from the Michael Late Benedum family; and relocated to its current building in 1994. |
| BridgeValley Community and Technical College – Montgomery | | Montgomery; 38°10′49″N 81°19′41″W | Fayette | | Academic | BridgeValley Community and Technical College | WVER | |
| BridgeValley Community and Technical College – South Charleston | | South Charleston; 38°21′14″N 81°41′55″W | Kanawha | | Academic | BridgeValley Community and Technical College | WVER | |
| Brooke County Public Library | A one-story brick building. | Wellsburg; 40°16′22″N 80°36′47″W | Brooke | 1897 | Public | Brooke County Public Library | WVLN | The library moved to its present location in 1972. |
| Buffalo Creek Memorial Library | | Man; 37°44′07″N 81°52′30″W | Logan | 1973 | Public | None | WCRLN | |
| Buffalo Public Library | | Buffalo; 38°36′30″N 81°59′23″W | Putnam | 1984 | Public | Putnam County Public Library | WCRLN | |
| Burlington Public Library | A one-story light gray wood siding building. | Burlington; 39°20′12″N 78°55′06″W | Mineral | 1981 | Public | Keyser–Mineral County Public Library | ELN | |
| Burnsville Public Library | A one-story building with gray siding and stonework. | Burnsville; 38°51′33″N 80°39′26″W | Braxton | 1976 | Public | None | WVLN | |
| Cabell County Public Library | A building with a brown shingled roof. | Huntington; 38°25′11″N 82°26′38″W | Cabell | 1902 | Public | Cabell County Public Library | WCRLN | |
| Calhoun County Public Library | | Grantsville; 38°55′25″N 81°05′49″W | Calhoun | 1930s | Public | Calhoun County Public Library | MLN, WVLN | |
| Camden Clark Medical Center Health Sciences Library | | Parkersburg; 39°16′10″N 81°33′33″W | Wood | | Other | West Virginia University Health System | | |
| Cameron Public Library | | Cameron; 39°49′31″N 80°33′50″W | Marshall | | Public | Moundsville–Marshall County Public Library | WVLN | |
| Capon Bridge Public Library | | Capon Bridge; 39°17′50″N 78°26′01″W | Hampshire | 1969 | Public | None | ELN | |
| Center Point Public Library | | Center Point; 39°23′18″N 80°38′08″W | Doddridge | 1978 | Public | Doddridge County Public Library | WVLN | |
| Centers for Disease Control and Prevention – Stephen B. Thacker CDC Library | | Morgantown; 39°39′19″N 79°57′16″W | Monongalia | | Other | Centers for Disease Control and Prevention | | |
| Central West Virginia Genealogy and History Library | | Horner; 39°00′06″N 80°22′56″W | Lewis | | Other | | | |
| Ceredo–Kenova Public Library | | Kenova; 38°24′00″N 82°34′28″W | Wayne | 1950 | Public | Wayne County Public Library | WCRLN | |
| Chapmanville Public Library | | Chapmanville; 37°58′30″N 82°01′46″W | Logan | 1977 | Public | None | WCRLN | |
| Charles Town Library | | Charles Town; 39°17′23″N 77°51′31″W | Jefferson | 1927 | Other | None | Unaffiliated | |
| Charles W. Gibson Public Library | | Buckhannon; 38°59′36″N 80°13′25″W | Upshur | 1925 | Public | None | WVLN | The library has operated at its current location since 1942. |
| Cheat Area Public Library | | Cheat Lake; 39°39′14″N 79°51′56″W | Monongalia | 1970s | Public | Morgantown Public Library | WVLN | |
| Clarksburg–Harrison Public Library | | Clarksburg; 39°16′52″N 80°20′27″W | Harrison | 1907 | Public | Clarksburg–Harrison Public Library | WVLS | |
| Clay Battelle Public Library | | Blacksville; 39°43′09″N 80°12′56″W | Monongalia | 1974 | Public | Morgantown Public Library | WVLN | |
| Clay County Public Library | | Clay; 38°27′38″N 81°04′36″W | Clay | 1962 | Public | None | Unaffiliated | |
| Clendenin Public Library | | Clendenin; 38°29′24″N 81°20′47″W | Kanawha | 1988 | Public | Kanawha County Public Library | KCLS | |
| Clinton District Public Library | | Ridgedale; 39°32′39″N 79°56′01″W | Monongalia | 1970s | Public | Morgantown Public Library | WVLN | |
| Coal River Public Library | | Racine; 38°08′19″N 81°38′51″W | Boone | 1980 | Public | Boone–Madison Public Library | MLN, WVLN | |
| Concord University – J. Franklin Marsh Memorial Library | A two-story red brick neoclassical structure with a portico of four sandstone columns. | Athens; 37°25′28″N 81°00′22″W | Mercer | | Academic | Concord University | MLN, WVER, WVLN | Officially dedicated in 1941, and named for university president J. Franklin Marsh in 1969, the library was renovated in the late 1970s and rededicated in 1980. |
| Cowen Public Library | | Cowen; 38°24′29″N 80°33′21″W | Webster | 1978 | Public | None | WVLN | |
| Cox Landing Public Library | | Lesage; 38°28′28″N 82°18′19″W | Cabell | | Public | Cabell County Public Library | WCRLN | |
| Craft Memorial Library | | Bluefield; 37°16′08″N 81°13′16″W | Mercer | 1913 | Public | None | MLN, WVLN | |
| Craigsville Public Library | | Craigsville; 38°19′43″N 80°39′09″W | Nicholas | 1976 | Public | None | MLN, WVLN | |
| Cross Lanes Public Library | | Cross Lanes; 38°25′36″N 81°47′03″W | Kanawha | 1976 | Public | Kanawha County Public Library | KCLS | |
| Davis and Elkins College – Booth Library | | Elkins; 38°55′53″N 79°50′46″W | Randolph | | Academic | Davis and Elkins College | WVER | |
| Doddridge County Public Library | | West Union; 39°17′48″N 80°46′35″W | Doddridge | 1952 | Public | Doddridge County Public Library | WVLN | |
| Dora B. Woodyard Memorial Library | | Elizabeth; 39°03′47″N 81°23′32″W | Wirt | 1962 | Public | None | MLN, WVLN | |
| Dunbar Public Library | | Dunbar; 38°21′33″N 81°44′24″W | Kanawha | 1977 | Public | Kanawha County Public Library | KCLS | |
| Durbin Public Library | | Durbin; 38°32′50″N 79°49′43″W | Pocahontas | | Public | Pocahontas County Public Library | MLN, WVLN | |
| Eastern West Virginia Community and Technical College | | Moorefield; 39°04′32″N 78°55′57″W | Hardy | | Academic | Eastern West Virginia Community and Technical College | WVER | |
| Eleanor Public Library | | Eleanor; 38°32′12″N 81°55′41″W | Putnam | 1978 | Public | Putnam County Public Library | WCRLN | |
| Elk Valley Public Library | | Elkview; 38°27′26″N 81°30′10″W | Kanawha | 1977 | Public | Kanawha County Public Library | KCLS | |
| Elkins–Randolph County Public Library | | Elkins; 38°55′37″N 79°50′57″W | Randolph | | Public | None | WVLN | |
| Fairmont State University – Ruth Ann Musick Library | | Fairmont; 39°28′59″N 80°09′45″W | Marion | | Academic | Fairmont State University | WVER | |
| Fairview Public Library | | Fairview; 39°35′33″N 80°15′01″W | Marion | 1976 | Public | Marion County Public Library | WVLS | |
| Fayette County Public Library | | Oak Hill; 37°58′15″N 81°08′56″W | Fayette | 1959 | Public | Fayette County Public Library | MLN, WVLN | |
| Fayetteville Public Library | | Fayetteville; 38°03′08″N 81°06′18″W | Fayette | 1959 | Public | Fayette County Public Library | MLN, WVLN | |
| Five Rivers Public Library | | Parsons; 39°05′55″N 79°40′52″W | Tucker | 1974 | Public | Five Rivers Public Library | WVLN | |
| Follansbee Public Library | | Follansbee; 40°19′37″N 80°35′44″W | Brooke | 1995 | Public | Brooke County Public Library | WVLN | |
| Fort Ashby Public Library | | Fort Ashby; 39°30′14″N 78°46′15″W | Mineral | 1974 | Public | Keyser–Mineral County Public Library | ELN | |
| Fort Gay Public Library | | Fort Gay; 38°06′57″N 82°35′38″W | Wayne | 1973 | Public | Wayne County Public Library | WCRLN | |
| Gallaher Village Public Library | | Huntington; 38°24′25″N 82°24′20″W | Cabell | 1961 | Public | Cabell County Public Library | WCRLN | |
| Gassaway Public Library | | Gassaway; 38°40′23″N 80°46′30″W | Braxton | 1967 | Public | None | WVLN | |
| Geary Public Library | | Left Hand; 38°37′11″N 81°14′30″W | Roane | 1967 | Public | Roane County Public Library | MLN, WVLN | |
| Gilbert Public Library | | Gilbert; 37°36′42″N 81°52′06″W | Mingo | | Public | Mingo County Public Library | WCRLN | |
| Gilmer Public Library | | Glenville; 38°56′16″N 80°50′02″W | Gilmer | 1979 | Public | None | WVLN | |
| Glasgow Public Library | | Glasgow; 38°12′48″N 81°25′36″W | Kanawha | 1976 | Public | Kanawha County Public Library | KCLS | |
| Glenville State University – Robert F. Kidd Library | | Glenville; 38°56′08″N 80°50′04″W | Gilmer | | Academic | Glenville State University | WVER, WVLN | |
| Grant County Public Library | | Petersburg; 38°59′37″N 79°07′33″W | Grant | 1966 | Public | Grant County Public Library | ELN | |
| Green Bank Public Library | | Green Bank; 38°25′28″N 79°49′44″W | Pocahontas | 1960 | Public | Pocahontas County Public Library | MLN, WVLN | |
| Greenbrier County Public Library | | Lewisburg; 37°48′11″N 80°27′00″W | Greenbrier | 1942 | Public | None | MLN | Originally housed in the Supreme Court Library Building. |
| Greenbrier Historical Society | | Lewisburg; 37°48′12″N 80°26′53″W | Greenbrier | | Other | | | |
| Guyan River Public Library | | Branchland; 38°14′58″N 82°11′24″W | Lincoln | 1978 | Public | Hamlin–Lincoln County Public Library | WCRLN | |
| Guyandotte Public Library | | Huntington; 38°25′46″N 82°23′16″W | Cabell | 1984 | Public | Cabell County Public Library | WCRLN | |
| Hamlin–Lincoln County Public Library | | Hamlin; 38°16′37″N 82°06′23″W | Lincoln | 1972 | Public | Hamlin–Lincoln County Public Library | WCRLN | |
| Hampshire County Public Library | | Romney; 39°20′34″N 78°45′30″W | Hampshire | 1935 | Public | None | ELN | The current library building was completed in 1967. |
| Hanover Public Library | | Hanover; 37°33′20″N 81°47′21″W | Wyoming | 1995 | Public | Wyoming County Public Library | MLN, WVLN | |
| Hardy County Public Library | | Moorefield; 39°03′44″N 78°58′13″W | Hardy | 1927 | Public | None | ELN | |
| Hedgesville Public Library | | Hedgesville; 39°33′16″N 77°59′38″W | Berkeley | 1968 | Public | Martinsburg–Berkeley County Public Library | ELN | |
| Helvetia Public Library | | Helvetia; 38°42′20″N 80°12′10″W | Randolph | 1984 | Public | None | WVLN | |
| Hillsboro Public Library | | Hillsboro; 38°08′14″N 80°12′30″W | Pocahontas | 1978 | Public | Pocahontas County Public Library | MLN, WVLN | |
| Hundred Public Library | | Hundred; 39°40′43″N 80°27′21″W | Wetzel | | Public | None | WVLN | |
| Hurricane Public Library | | Hurricane; 38°25′45″N 82°01′10″W | Putnam | 1989 | Public | Putnam County Public Library | WCRLN | |
| Iaeger Public Library | | Iaeger; 37°27′51″N 81°48′52″W | McDowell | | Public | McDowell County Public Library | MLN, WVLN | |
| Jackson County Public Library – Ravenswood | | Ravenswood; 38°57′01″N 81°45′39″W | Jackson | 1949 | Public | Jackson County Public Library | MLN, WVLN | |
| Jackson County Public Library – Ripley | | Ripley; 38°49′12″N 81°42′38″W | Jackson | 1949 | Public | Jackson County Public Library | MLN, WVLN | |
| James W. Curry Public Library and Park | | French Creek; 38°45′43″N 80°13′00″W | Upshur | 1980 | Other | None | Unaffiliated | |
| Kanawha County Public Library | | Charleston; 38°21′00″N 81°38′08″W | Kanawha | 1908 | Public | Kanawha County Public Library | KCLS | |
| Kermit Public Library | | Kermit; 37°50′40″N 82°24′30″W | Mingo | | Public | Mingo County Public Library | WCRLN | |
| Keyser–Mineral County Public Library | | Keyser; 39°26′26″N 78°58′28″W | Mineral | 1937 | Public | Keyser–Mineral County Public Library | ELN | |
| Kingwood Public Library | | Kingwood; 39°28′19″N 79°41′24″W | Preston | 1941 | Public | None | WVLN | |
| Linwood Public Library | | Linwood; 38°24′56″N 80°01′58″W | Pocahontas | 2009 | Public | Pocahontas County Public Library | MLN, WVLN | |
| Logan Area Public Library | | Logan; 37°50′59″N 81°59′45″W | Logan | 1997 | Public | None | WCRLN | |
| Louis Bennett Public Library | | Weston; 39°02′12″N 80°27′55″W | Lewis | 1922 | Public | None | WVLN | |
| Lowe Public Library | | Shinnston; 39°23′48″N 80°18′03″W | Harrison | 1973 | Public | None | WVLN | |
| Lynn Murray Memorial Public Library | | Chester; 40°36′56″N 80°33′38″W | Hancock | 1970 | Public | None | WVLN | |
| Mannington Public Library | | Mannington; 39°31′47″N 80°20′39″W | Marion | 1964 | Public | Marion County Public Library | WVLS | |
| Marion County Public Library | | Fairmont; 39°29′06″N 80°08′41″W | Marion | 1890s | Public | Marion County Public Library | WVLS | |
| Marmet Public Library | | Marmet; 38°14′45″N 81°34′06″W | Kanawha | 1980 | Public | Kanawha County Public Library | KCLS | |
| Marshall University – Health Science Library | | Huntington; 38°24′34″N 82°25′37″W | Cabell | | Academic | Marshall University Libraries | WVER | |
| Marshall University – James E. Morrow Library | | Huntington; 38°25′27″N 82°25′46″W | Cabell | 1930 | Academic | Marshall University Libraries | WVER | |
| Marshall University – John Deaver Drinko Library | | Huntington; 38°25′22″N 82°25′50″W | Cabell | 1998 | Academic | Marshall University Libraries | WVER | |
| Marshall University – South Charleston Library | | South Charleston; 38°21′26″N 81°41′51″W | Kanawha | | Academic | Marshall University Libraries | WVER | |
| Martinsburg VA Medical Center | | Martinsburg; 39°25′04″N 77°54′41″W | Berkeley | | Other | United States Department of Veterans Affairs | | |
| Martinsburg–Berkeley County Public Library | | Martinsburg; 39°27′22″N 77°57′51″W | Berkeley | 1926 | Public | Martinsburg–Berkeley County Public Library | ELN | |
| Mary H. Weir Public Library | | Weirton; 40°24′03″N 80°35′23″W | Hancock | 1924 | Public | None | WVLN | |
| Mason City Public Library | | Mason; 39°01′16″N 82°01′37″W | Mason | | Public | Mason County Public Library | MLN, WVLN | |
| Mason County Public Library | | Point Pleasant; 38°50′39″N 82°08′12″W | Mason | 1942 | Public | Mason County Public Library | MLN, WVLN | |
| Matewan Public Library | | Matewan; 37°37′23″N 82°09′51″W | Mingo | | Public | Mingo County Public Library | WCRLN | |
| McClintic Public Library | | Marlinton; 38°13′16″N 80°05′32″W | Pocahontas | 1953 | Public | Pocahontas County Public Library | MLN, WVLN | |
| McDowell County Public Library | | Welch; 37°25′57″N 81°34′59″W | McDowell | 1936 | Public | McDowell County Public Library | MLN, WVLN | |
| Milton Public Library | | Milton; 38°26′12″N 82°07′59″W | Cabell | 1927 | Public | Cabell County Public Library | WCRLN | |
| Mingo County Public Library | | Delbarton; 37°42′40″N 82°11′02″W | Mingo | 1963 | Public | Mingo County Public Library | WCRLN | |
| Monroe County Public Library | | Union; 37°35′23″N 80°32′46″W | Monroe | 1947 | Public | None | MLN, WVLN | |
| Montgomery Public Library | | Montgomery; 38°10′58″N 81°19′19″W | Fayette | 1977 | Public | Fayette County Public Library | MLN, WVLN | |
| Morgan County Public Library | | Berkeley Springs; 39°37′40″N 78°13′36″W | Morgan | 1924 | Public | None | ELN | |
| Morgantown Public Library | | Morgantown; 39°37′49″N 79°57′16″W | Monongalia | 1926 | Public | Morgantown Public Library | WVLN | |
| Moundsville–Marshall County Public Library | | Moundsville; 39°55′14″N 80°44′41″W | Marshall | 1916 | Public | Moundsville–Marshall County Public Library | WVLN | |
| Mountaintop Public Library | | Thomas; 39°08′51″N 79°29′38″W | Tucker | 1979 | Public | None | WVLN | |
| Mount Hope Public Library | | Mount Hope; 37°53′36″N 81°09′57″W | Fayette | 1971 | Public | Fayette County Public Library | MLN, WVLN | |
| Mountwest Community and Technical College – Resource Center | | Huntington; 38°23′34″N 82°27′30″W | Cabell | | Academic | Mountwest Community and Technical College | WVER | |
| Mullens Area Public Library | | Mullens; 37°35′06″N 81°22′50″W | Wyoming | 1967 | Public | Wyoming County Public Library | MLN, WVLN | |
| Musselman–South Berkeley Community Library | | Inwood; 39°21′07″N 78°02′30″W | Berkeley | | Public | Martinsburg–Berkeley County Public Library | ELN | |
| New Haven Public Library | | New Haven; 38°59′20″N 81°58′23″W | Mason | | Public | Mason County Public Library | MLN, WVLN | |
| New Martinsville Public Library | | New Martinsville; 39°38′26″N 80°51′52″W | Wetzel | 1946 | Public | None | WVLN | |
| New River Community and Technical College – New River CTC Library | | Lewisburg; 37°48′12″N 80°26′53″W | Greenbrier | | Academic | New River Community and Technical College | MLN, WVER | |
| Nitro Public Library | | Nitro; 38°25′23″N 81°50′47″W | Kanawha | 1964 | Public | Kanawha County Public Library | KCLS | |
| North Berkeley Public Library | | Falling Waters; 39°32′53″N 77°54′59″W | Berkeley | | Public | Martinsburg–Berkeley County Public Library | ELN | |
| Nutter Fort Public Library | | Nutter Fort; 39°15′38″N 80°19′29″W | Harrison | 1983 | Public | None | WVLN | |
| Oak Hill Public Library | | Oak Hill; 37°58′14″N 81°08′57″W | Fayette | 1968 | Public | Fayette County Public Library | MLN, WVLN | |
| Oceana Public Library | | Oceana; 37°41′44″N 81°38′07″W | Wyoming | 1968 | Public | Wyoming County Public Library | MLN, WVLN | |
| Ohio County Public Library | | Wheeling; 40°03′49″N 80°43′12″W | Ohio | 1882 | Public | Ohio County Public Library | Unaffiliated | |
| Paden City Public Library | | Paden City; 39°36′13″N 80°56′07″W | Wetzel | 1946 | Public | None | WVLN | |
| Parkersburg and Wood County Public Library | | Parkersburg; 39°17′10″N 81°32′16″W | Wood | 1891 | Public | Parkersburg–Wood County Public Library | MLN, WVLN | |
| Paw Paw Public Library | | Paw Paw; 39°31′40″N 78°27′29″W | Morgan | 1971 | Public | None | ELN | |
| Pendleton County Public Library | | Franklin; 38°38′43″N 79°19′47″W | Pendleton | 1936 | Public | None | ELN | |
| Pennsboro Public Library | | Pennsboro; 39°17′06″N 80°58′04″W | Ritchie | 1984 | Public | Ritchie County Public Library | MLN, WVLN | |
| Peterstown Public Library | | Peterstown; 37°24′04″N 80°47′31″W | Ritchie | 1977 | Public | None | MLN, WVLN | |
| Philippi Public Library | | Philippi; 39°09′05″N 80°02′16″W | Barbour | 1966 | Public | None | WVLN | |
| Piedmont Public Library | | Piedmont; 39°28′51″N 79°02′50″W | Mineral | 1960 | Public | None | ELN | |
| Pierpont Community and Technical College | | Fairmont; 39°25′56″N 80°11′31″W | Marion | | Academic | Pierpont Community and Technical College | WVER | |
| Pine Grove Public Library | | Pine Grove; 39°33′58″N 80°40′43″W | Wetzel | 1975 | Public | None | WVLN | |
| Pioneer Memorial Public Library | | Harman; 38°55′15″N 79°31′17″W | Randolph | 1969 | Public | None | WVLN | |
| Pleasants County Public Library | | St. Marys; 39°23′25″N 81°12′30″W | Pleasants | 1935 | Public | None | MLN, WVLN | |
| Poca Public Library | | Poca; 38°28′33″N 81°48′47″W | Putnam | 1980 | Public | Putnam County Public Library | WCRLN | |
| Potomac State College of West Virginia University – Mary F. Shipper Library | | Keyser; 39°26′18″N 78°58′51″W | Mineral | 1901 | Academic | West Virginia University Libraries | WVER | |
| Princeton Community Hospital Medical Library | | Princeton; 37°21′49″N 81°06′48″W | Mercer | | Other | West Virginia University Health System | | |
| Princeton Public Library | | Princeton; 37°22′11″N 81°05′46″W | Mercer | 1914 | Public | None | Unaffiliated | |
| Putnam County Public Library | | Teays Valley; 38°27′37″N 81°55′59″W | Putnam | 1961 | Public | Putnam County Public Library | WCRLN | |
| Rainelle Public Library | | Rainelle; 37°58′14″N 80°45′43″W | Greenbrier | 1974 | Public | None | MLN, WVLN | |
| Raleigh County Public Library | | Beckley; 37°46′47″N 81°11′16″W | Raleigh | 1924 | Public | Raleigh County Public Library | MLN, WVLN | |
| Richwood Public Library | | Richwood; 38°13′29″N 80°31′47″W | Nicholas | 1942 | Public | None | MLN, WVLN | |
| Ritchie County Public Library | | Harrisville; 39°12′33″N 81°02′52″W | Ritchie | 1931 | Public | Ritchie County Public Library | MLN, WVLN | |
| Riverside Public Library | | Diamond; 38°12′24″N 81°30′43″W | Kanawha | 2000 | Public | Kanawha County Public Library | KCLS | |
| Roane County Public Library | | Spencer; 38°48′12″N 81°21′06″W | Roane | 1951 | Public | Roane County Public Library | MLN, WVLN | |
| Ronceverte Public Library | | Ronceverte; 37°44′51″N 80°28′11″W | Greenbrier | 1979 | Public | None | MLN, WVLN | |
| Rupert Public Library | | Rupert; 37°57′45″N 80°41′16″W | Greenbrier | 1977 | Public | None | MLN, WVLN | |
| Russell Memorial Public Library | | Mill Creek; 38°43′46″N 79°58′18″W | Randolph | 1970s | Public | None | WVLN | |
| Salem Branch Library | | Salem; 39°17′39″N 80°35′41″W | Harrison | 2022 | Public | Clarksburg–Harrison Public Library | WVLS | |
| Salem University – Benedum Library | | Salem; 39°17′21″N 80°34′20″W | Harrison | | Academic | Salem University | | |
| Salt Rock Public Library | | Salt Rock; 38°19′15″N 82°13′15″W | Cabell | | Public | Cabell County Public Library | WCRLN | |
| Shady Spring Public Library | | Shady Spring; 37°41′44″N 81°06′01″W | Raleigh | 1984 | Public | Raleigh County Public Library | MLN, WVLN | |
| Shepherd University – Scarborough Library | | Shepherdstown; 39°25′58″N 77°48′16″W | Jefferson | | Academic | Shepherd University | WVER | |
| Shepherdstown Public Library | | Shepherdstown; 39°25′46″N 77°49′09″W | Jefferson | 1922 | Public | None | ELN | |
| Sissonville Public Library | | Sissonville; 38°28′46″N 81°40′14″W | Kanawha | 1979 | Public | Kanawha County Public Library | KCLS | |
| Sistersville Public Library | | Sistersville; 39°33′54″N 80°59′41″W | Tyler | 1897 | Public | None | WVLN | |
| Sophia Public Library | | Sophia; 37°42′30″N 81°15′12″W | Raleigh | 1976 | Public | Raleigh County Public Library | MLN, WVLN | |
| South Charleston Public Library | | South Charleston; 38°21′59″N 81°41′38″W | Kanawha | 1943 | Public | None | Unaffiliated | |
| South Jefferson Public Library | | Summit Point; 39°14′56″N 77°57′32″W | Jefferson | 1984 | Public | None | ELN | |
| South Parkersburg Public Library | | South Parkersburg; 39°14′22″N 81°32′37″W | Wood | | Public | Parkersburg–Wood County Public Library | MLN, WVLN | |
| Southern Area Public Library | | Lost Creek; 39°09′37″N 80°21′02″W | Harrison | 1972 | Public | None | WVLN | In 2013, the library was selected as the Best Small Library in America by Library Journal and the Gates Foundation, and awarded the Frederic J. Glazer Innovation Award. |
| Southern West Virginia Community and Technical College – Harless Library | | Mount Gay; 37°51′04″N 82°01′26″W | Logan | | Academic | Southern West Virginia Community and Technical College | WVER | |
| Southern West Virginia Community and Technical College – Williamson Campus Library | | Williamson; 37°40′32″N 82°17′35″W | Mingo | | Academic | Southern West Virginia Community and Technical College | WVER | |
| St. Albans Public Library | | St. Albans; 38°23′08″N 81°50′02″W | Kanawha | 1963 | Public | Kanawha County Public Library | KCLS | |
| Summers County Public Library | | Hinton; 37°40′26″N 80°53′28″W | Summers | 1977 | Public | None | MLN, WVLN | |
| Summersville Public Library | | Summersville; 38°18′43″N 80°49′49″W | Nicholas | 1962 | Public | None | MLN, WVLN | |
| Supreme Court of Appeals of West Virginia State Law Library | | Charleston; 38°20′13″N 81°36′40″W | Kanawha | | Other | Supreme Court of Appeals of West Virginia | | |
| Sutton Public Library | | Sutton; 38°39′51″N 80°42′25″W | Braxton | 1967 | Public | None | WVLN | |
| Swaney Memorial Library | | New Cumberland; 40°29′51″N 80°36′25″W | Hancock | 1954 | Public | None | WVLN | |
| Taylor County Public Library | | Grafton; 39°20′12″N 80°01′31″W | Taylor | 1923 | Public | None | WVLN | |
| Terra Alta Public Library | | Terra Alta; 39°26′38″N 79°32′25″W | Preston | | Public | None | WVLN | |
| Tyler County Public Library | | Middlebourne; 39°29′39″N 80°54′11″W | Tyler | 1967 | Public | None | WVLN | |
| United Hospital Center Health Sciences Library | | Bridgeport; 39°19′42″N 80°14′23″W | Harrison | | Other | West Virginia University Health System | | |
| United States Fish and Wildlife Service Conservation Library | | Shepherdstown; 39°29′14″N 77°48′20″W | Jefferson | | Other | United States Fish and Wildlife Service National Conservation Training Center | | |
| University of Charleston – Schoenbaum Library | | Charleston; 38°20′01″N 81°37′00″W | Kanawha | | Academic | University of Charleston | | |
| Upshur County Public Library | | Buckhannon; 38°57′58″N 80°14′27″W | Upshur | 1956 | Public | Upshur County Public Library | WVLN | |
| Valley Head Public Library | | Valley Head; 38°32′36″N 80°02′06″W | Randolph | 1975 | Public | None | WVLN | |
| Vienna Public Library | | Vienna; 39°19′21″N 81°33′11″W | Wood | 1954 | Public | None | Unaffiliated | |
| Walton Public Library | | Walton; 38°38′17″N 81°24′05″W | Roane | | Public | Roane County Public Library | MLN, WVLN | |
| War Public Library | | War; 37°17′42″N 81°41′43″W | McDowell | 1978 | Public | McDowell County Public Library | MLN, WVLN | |
| Waverly Public Library | | Waverly; 39°20′18″N 81°23′00″W | Wood | | Public | Parkersburg–Wood County Public Library | MLN, WVLN | |
| Wayne Public Library | | Wayne; 38°13′20″N 82°26′28″W | Wayne | 1973 | Public | Wayne County Public Library | WCRLN | |
| Webster–Addison Public Library | | Webster Springs; 38°28′31″N 80°24′34″W | Webster | 1973 | Public | None | WVLN | |
| West Huntington Public Library | | Huntington; 38°24′29″N 82°28′41″W | Cabell | 1968 | Public | Cabell County Public Library | WCRLN | |
| West Liberty University – Paul N. Elbin Library | | West Liberty; 40°09′55″N 80°36′09″W | Ohio | | Academic | West Liberty University | WVER | |
| West Virginia Archives and History Library | | Charleston; 38°20′15″N 81°36′50″W | Kanawha | | Other | West Virginia Department of Arts, Culture and History, West Virginia Archives and History | | |
| West Virginia Library Commission Special Services | | Charleston; 38°20′15″N 81°36′51″W | Kanawha | | Other | West Virginia Library Commission | | |
| West Virginia Library Commission State Library Services | | Charleston; 38°20′15″N 81°36′51″W | Kanawha | | Other | West Virginia Library Commission | | |
| West Virginia Northern Community College Library | | Wheeling; 40°03′48″N 80°43′17″W | Ohio | | Academic | West Virginia Northern Community College | WVER | |
| West Virginia School of Osteopathic Medicine – James R. Stookey Library | | Lewisburg; 37°48′18″N 80°26′13″W | Greenbrier | | Academic | West Virginia School of Osteopathic Medicine | | |
| West Virginia Schools for the Deaf and the Blind Library | | Romney; 39°20′31″N 78°45′09″W | Hampshire | | Other | West Virginia Schools for the Deaf and the Blind | | |
| West Virginia State University – Drain–Jordan Library | | Institute; 38°22′53″N 81°45′51″W | Kanawha | | Academic | West Virginia State University | WVER | |
| West Virginia University – Downtown Campus Library | | Morgantown; 39°38′00″N 79°57′15″W | Monongalia | | Academic | West Virginia University Libraries | WVER | |
| West Virginia University – Evansdale Library | | Morgantown; 39°38′43″N 79°58′17″W | Monongalia | | Academic | West Virginia University Libraries | WVER | |
| West Virginia University – George R. Farmer Jr. Law Library | | Morgantown; 39°38′55″N 79°57′31″W | Monongalia | | Academic | West Virginia University Libraries | WVER | |
| West Virginia University – Health Sciences Library | | Morgantown; 39°39′20″N 79°57′32″W | Monongalia | | Academic | West Virginia University Libraries | WVER | |
| West Virginia University at Parkersburg Library | | Parkersburg; 39°13′00″N 81°30′20″W | Wood | | Academic | West Virginia University Libraries | WVER | |
| West Virginia University – Charleston Division Health Sciences Center Library | | Charleston; 38°19′50″N 81°36′16″W | Kanawha | | Academic | West Virginia University Libraries | WVER | |
| West Virginia University Institute of Technology – Beckley Campus Library | | Beckley; 37°46′33″N 81°11′03″W | Raleigh | | Academic | West Virginia University Libraries | WVER | |
| West Virginia University West Virginia and Regional History Center | | Morgantown; 39°38′01″N 79°57′16″W | Monongalia | | Academic | West Virginia University Libraries | WVER | |
| West Virginia Wesleyan College – Annie Merner Pfeiffer Library | | Buckhannon; 38°59′27″N 80°13′08″W | Upshur | | Academic | West Virginia Wesleyan College | | |
| Wheeling Hospital Medical Library | | Wheeling; 40°03′34″N 80°41′06″W | Ohio | | Other | West Virginia University Health System | | |
| Wheeling University – Bishop Hodges Library | | Wheeling; 40°04′05″N 80°41′28″W | Ohio | | Academic | Wheeling University | | |
| White Sulphur Springs Public Library | | White Sulphur Springs; 37°47′24″N 80°18′10″W | Greenbrier | 1912 | Public | None | MLN, WVLN | |
| Whitesville Public Library | | Whitesville; 37°58′50″N 81°32′05″W | Boone | 1984 | Public | Boone–Madison Public Library | MLN, WVLN | |
| William R. Sharpe Jr. Hospital Patient Library | | Weston; 39°02′28″N 80°29′49″W | Lewis | | Other | | | |
| Williamson Public Library | | Williamson; 37°40′21″N 82°16′43″W | Mingo | 1930 | Public | None | WCRLN | |
| Williamstown Public Library | | Williamstown; 39°24′04″N 81°27′00″W | Wood | | Public | Parkersburg–Wood County Public Library | MLN, WVLN | |
| Wyoming County Public Library | | Pineville; 37°34′58″N 81°32′13″W | Wyoming | 1972 | Public | Wyoming County Public Library | MLN, WVLN | |

Key
| Abbreviation | Consortium |
|---|---|
| ELN | Eastern Library Network |
| KCLS | Kanawha County Library System |
| MLN | Mountain Library Network |
| WCRLN | Western Counties Regional Library Network |
| WVER | West Virginia Electronic Resources Consortium |
| WVLN | West Virginia Library Network |
| WVLS | West Virginia LibShare |

== Former libraries ==
| Library name | Image | Location | County | Est. | Closed | Type | System | Notes |
|---|---|---|---|---|---|---|---|---|
| Alderson Broaddus University – Pickett Library | | Philippi; 39°09′27″N 80°02′54″W | Barbour | | 2023 | Academic | Alderson Broaddus University | |
| Ohio Valley University Library | | Vienna; 39°18′20″N 81°32′04″W | Wood | | 2022 | Academic | Ohio Valley University | |
| West Virginia University Institute of Technology – Vining Library | | Montgomery; 38°10′47″N 81°19′25″W | Fayette | | 2017 | Academic | West Virginia University Libraries | |

== See also ==
- History of libraries in West Virginia
- List of Carnegie libraries in West Virginia
- List of libraries in the United States
- List of West Virginia archives
