= Parkersburg (disambiguation) =

Parkersburg is the name of some places in the United States:

- Parkersburg, West Virginia, the third-largest city in West Virginia
  - Parkersburg High School
  - Parkersburg South High School
  - Parkersburg Catholic High School
- Parkersburg, Illinois, a village
- Parkersburg, Indiana, an unincorporated place
- Parkersburg, Iowa, a small city

== See also ==
- South Parkersburg, West Virginia
