= Huntington City Hall =

City hall of Huntington, West Virginia, U.S.

- Huntington City Hall in 2015

General information
- Architectural style: Neoclassical architecture
- Location: 800 5th Ave, Huntington, West Virginia 25701
- Coordinates: 38°25′10.56″N 82°26′41.82″W
- Opened: 1915

Design and construction
- Architect(s): Verus T. Ritter

Website
- www.cityofhuntington.com

The Huntington City Hall is the city hall of Huntington, West Virginia, located next to the Cabell County Public Library.

== History ==
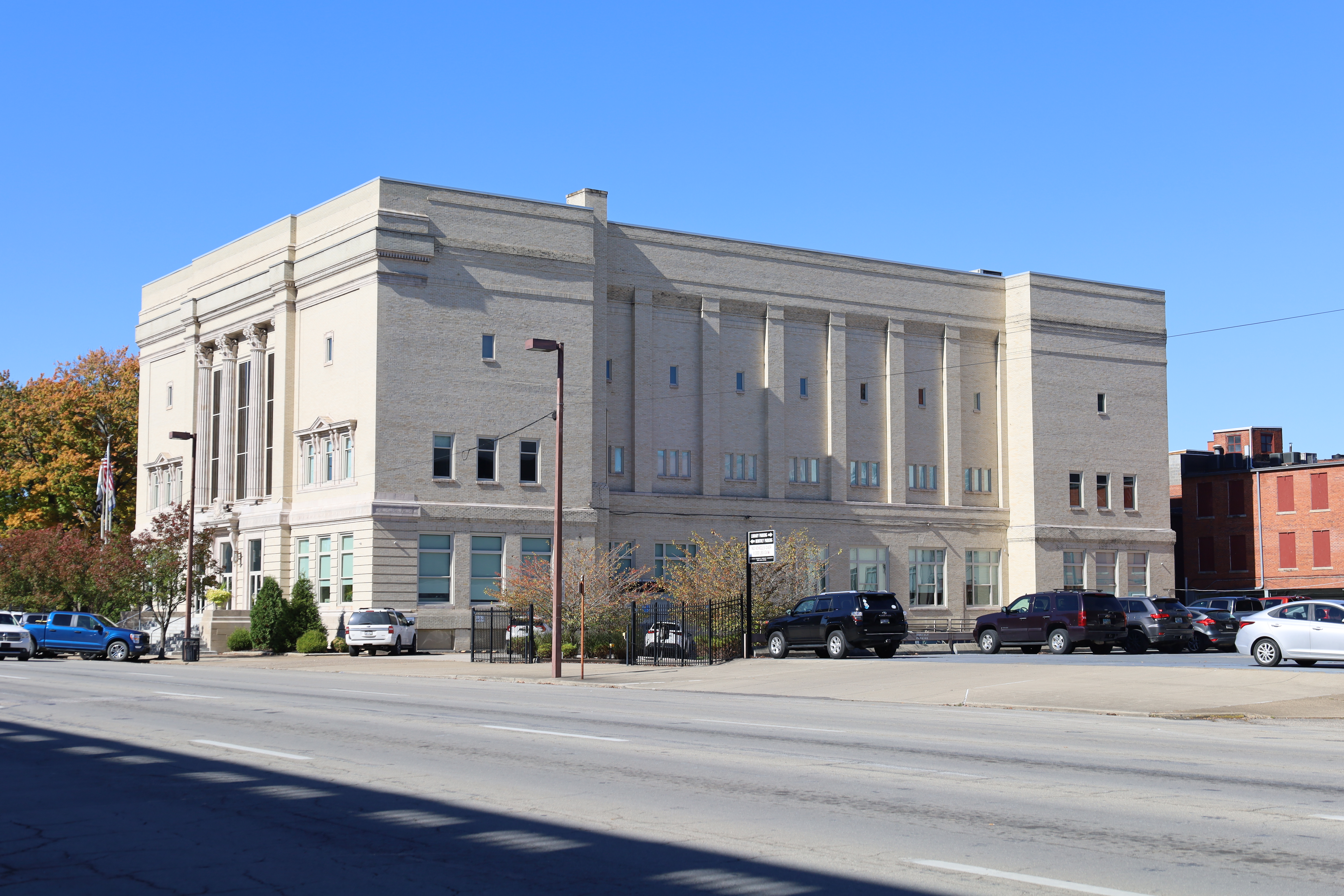
Side of the building in 2023

In 1871, when Huntington was founded, the city used a small building on 4th Avenue as their city hall. Later, a larger red brick building was built on 5th Avenue that also housed their city offices, police department, fire department, and the city jail. In 1887, the county seat of Cabell County changed from Barboursville to Huntington, which led to the county government using their city building until 1901, when the construction of the Cabell County Courthouse was completed.

In 1911, the city of Huntington purchased a piece of land next to the county courthouse on 5th Avenue to construct the Huntington City Hall, using Verus T. Ritter's style of Neoclassical architecture. The building was completed in 1915 and included a 2,500-seat auditorium named The Jean Carlo Stephenson Auditorium.

== Events ==
The Huntington City Hall is the home of the Appalachian Film Festival, one of the largest film festivals in West Virginia showcasing local stories on Appalachian culture.

== See also ==
- Cityscape of Huntington, West Virginia
- Downtown Huntington Historic District
