= Fred Glazer =

American librarian

Frederic Jay Glazer
- Born: February 20, 1937; Portsmouth, Virginia, US
- Died: December 8, 1997 (aged 60); Charleston, West Virginia, US
- Education: Columbia University
- Occupation: Librarian
- Spouse: Sylvia Katherine Lerner
- Relatives: Hoyt Glazer (son)

Frederic Jay Glazer (February 20, 1937 – December 8, 1997) was an American librarian and director of the West Virginia Library Commission from 1972 to 1996. Nicknamed the "P.T. Barnum of libraries," he was an outspoken promoter of libraries who was instrumental in greatly expanding library service and funding throughout West Virginia. In 1999, American Libraries named him one of the "100 Most Important Leaders We Had in the 20th Century."

== Biography ==
Glazer was born in Portsmouth, Virginia, on February 20, 1937, to Esther Blachman and Moses Herman Glazer. He married Sylvia Katherine Lerner in 1963 and was the father of two children.

Glazer earned his B.A. in economics from Columbia University in 1958. After that, he worked for the advertising company Dancer Fitzgerald Sample as a media buyer. In 1960, he entered the U.S. Army Infantry at Fort Dix, New Jersey. From 1961 to 1962, he served as a private first class at Fort Lee in Virginia. In 1962 and 1963, he worked as a library assistant at the Special Services Library in Fort Lee. From 1963 to 1964, he returned to Columbia for his Master's in Library Science.

Glazer worked as an adult services librarian at the Norfolk Public Library in Virginia from 1964 to 1967, and he was director of the Chesapeake Public Library System in Virginia from 1967 to 1972.

Glazer became executive secretary of the West Virginia Library Commission, based in Charleston, in 1972. He served for 24 years until his controversial firing in 1996. He died of kidney failure at age 60 on December 8, 1997.

== Accomplishments ==
Glazer is credited for being largely instrumental in the expansion of library services in West Virginia during his time at the Library Commission. During his tenure, the number of public libraries in the state increased from 89 to over 175, and bookmobiles were deployed to serve West Virginia's geographically isolated communities.

Library expansion in the state was partially enabled by Glazer's Instant Libraries program, a system of prefabricated library buildings designed by architect J. D. King to be built quickly and efficiently in communities previously lacking library service.

As head of the West Virginia Library Commission, Glazer helped develop and implement a statewide library automation network, which greatly improved inter-library communications and gave patrons greater access to library materials throughout the state. The system, designed by Vinod Chachra of the library automation software developer Virginia Tech Library Systems (now VTLS), went active at its Charleston-based hub in November 1982. Other library networks have since been modeled after West Virginia's example.

Glazer was a strong advocate for increased library funding. He argued that libraries should promote themselves as businesses do in order to gain public support and, in turn, monetary support. In a speech to members of the Arkansas Library Association, he said, “Today's fund-seeking librarian would do well to be a cross between P. T. Barnum and Muhammad Ali... We can imitate the campaigns of General Motors, General Mills, Exxon, the neighborhood grocer, bank or any other institution.”

As head of the West Virginia Library Commission, Glazer spearheaded several public relations campaigns to promote libraries. One particularly successful effort was the nationwide “Be with a Book for a Day” campaign, which urged people to carry a favorite book with them for the day while wearing the campaign's logo. It garnered several celebrity participants, including then-Arkansas Governor Bill Clinton, Walter Cronkite, and Jacqueline Kennedy Onassis.

Glazer also lobbied directly for higher library funding. While library funding was below 10 cents per capita, he handed out rolls of Life Savers candy to legislators and told them, “That's how much you're supporting libraries.” By the end of his tenure, per capita library funding increased to about $3.75.

Glazer traveled extensively to work with other library professionals, including visits to China and Sweden. In 1994, he served 4 months as an American Library Association Library Fellow at Moscow's Library of Foreign Literature in Russia.

== Controversy over dismissal ==
On March 29, 1996, Fred Glazer was told by commissioners that he must resign his post as director of the West Virginia Library Commission or be fired at the commissioners' next meeting, and on March 29 the ultimatum was reiterated in writing. Glazer ignored both requests, and on April 22, 1996, the West Virginia Library Commission voted 4–3 to fire Fred Glazer as its director. The commission provided no reason for the firing, and Glazer claimed the motivations for his dismissal were “personal and political.” The firing aroused protest and suspicions of foul play in the library community and the community of West Virginia. A former commission chair coordinated a fundraising group, the Friends of Fred Glazer, to assist Glazer in litigation, and then-Library Journal editor-in-chief John N. Berry III called for donations from the library community.

On July 24 of the same year, Glazer filed suit against the commission, claiming his firing was unlawful and citing age discrimination and defamation of character. He died before litigation was completed, however, and his family dropped the suit in 1998.
