= Craft Memorial Library =

Public library in Bluefield, West Virginia

- 37°16′7.74″N 81°13′24.41″W
- Location: 600 Commerce Street, Bluefield, West Virginia 24701, USA

Other information
- Director: Eva McGuire
- Website: https://craftmemorial.lib.wv.us/

The Craft Memorial Library (CML) is a public library serving the city of Bluefield, West Virginia. CML also operates as part of the Mountain Library Network, a resource sharing consortium which unites public library services across West Virginia. The library is governed by a publicly elected board of trustees.

== History ==
In 1913, the first library was started in Bluefield, West Virginia. This library was started by the local Civic Club. In the 1920s, the library moved to the first floor of the Bluefield Municipal Building which was constructed in 1924.

The Craft Memorial Library was opened in 1974 with funding from John Elliot Craft and Hellen T. Craft who were married business partners in West Virginia running a regional transportation business. The Mercer County Bookmobile started that same year, and the current bookmobile can hold a maximum of 3,500 books.

== Collections and Services ==
The Craft Memorial Library offers several resources including books, printing, public meeting rooms, fax services, a seed sharing library, 3D printing, online databases, ebooks, and programs for adults, teens, and children.

The library also serves researchers interested in local history. The Craft Memorial Library houses the Bluefield Daily Telegraph newspapers between 1896-2017 and helps people find obituaries. The Eastern Regional Coal Archives (ERCA) is in the Craft Memorial Library, which started in 1983 after the Pocahontas Coalfield Centennial Celebration. Dr. Stuart McGehee (d. 2010) is the founder of the ERCA. Visitors are asked to make an appointment before visiting the archive.

The Friends of Craft Memorial Library is a non-profit dedicated to supporting the public library's present-day needs while ensuring interest in it continues. Members pay an annual fee and adult members have a vote in library decisions.

== Current Library Board Members ==
- Mrs. Nancy Siggelkow
- Barbara Thompson Smith
- Mr. Jeff Disibbio
- Mr. Frank Wilkinson
- Mrs. Martha Richardson

== See also ==
- List of libraries in West Virginia
