= Carnegie Public Library (Huntington, West Virginia) =

- U.S. National Register of Historic Places
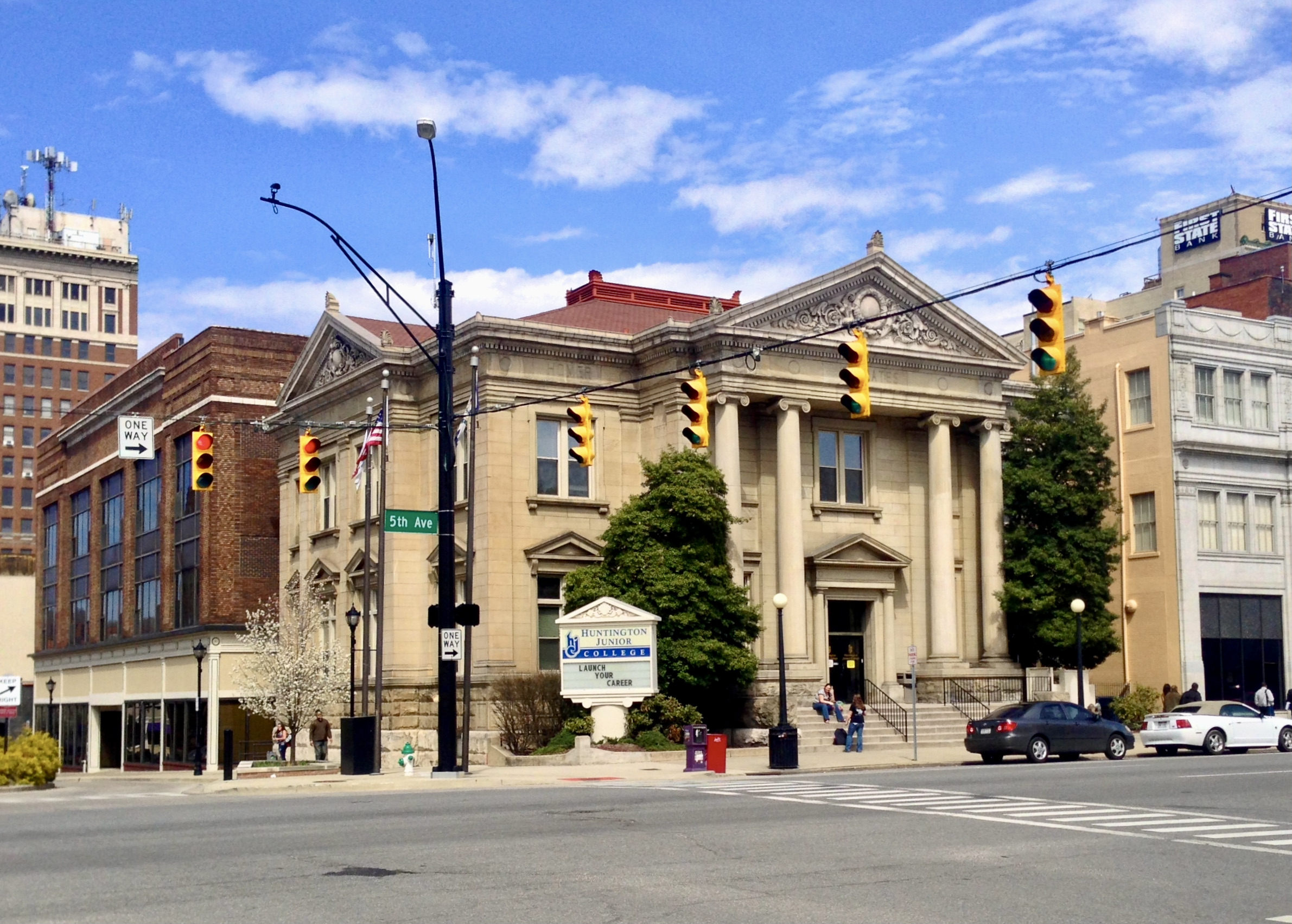
- Carnegie Public Library

- Location within West Virginia Location within the United States
- Location: 900 5th St., Huntington, West Virginia
- Coordinates: 38°25′11″N 82°26′36″W
- Area: 0.2 acres (0.081 ha)
- Built: 1902
- Architect: Stewart, James B.
- Architectural style: Beaux Arts
- NRHP reference No.: 80004015
- Added to NRHP: April 3, 1980

The Carnegie Public Library at Huntington, West Virginia, formerly also known as the Cabell County Public Library, is a historic library building located on the northeast corner of Fifth Avenue and Ninth Street. It was the first public library in the county. It served the community as a library until 1980, when a new library opened across the street. The building currently houses the Huntington Junior College.

== History ==
At the time of the library's construction, there were no public libraries in Huntington or Cabell County, and the only existing library was located in the First Congregational Church. In 1901, industrialist Andrew Carnegie offered $25,000 for the construction of a public library, on the condition that the city would supply the land and maintain the building. A lot of ninety feet square was conveyed by the city to the Board of Education for this purpose, and plans were drawn up by local architect James B. Stewart. Construction began in the spring of 1902, and Carnegie donated an additional $10,000 for the building. The library was one of three thousand constructed across the country by Carnegie between 1885 and 1919.

The cornerstone was laid on November 14, 1902, by W. H. H. Holswade, President of the Board of Education, and H. C. Gordon, the mayor of Huntington. The original plans called for stone veneer only on the south and west sides, facing Fifth Avenue and Ninth Street, while the other sides would be brick cemented into imitation stone. However, in December, 1902 it was decided to continue the stone veneer along the library's north side, and forty feet of the east side. Construction was finished a year later, and the library opened to the public on January 1, 1904. The library's initial collection included only 750 books, and the building also housed the offices of the Board of Education.

The first librarian was Miss Adrianne Burns, who served from 1904 to 1908, and enlarged the collection to 6,000 volumes. Miss Lewis Harvey served as librarian from 1908 to 1943. During the library's second decade of operation, the Board of Education vacated its offices, and the library came to occupy the entire building. The interior was renovated in the 1930s under the supervision of architect Albert F. Tucker. The Carnegie library served the city of Huntington until 1980, when a new public library opened across Ninth Street. At the same time, the Carnegie library was added to the National Register of Historic Places.

The Cabell County Library Board sold the building for $185,000. A group of investors from Columbus, Ohio then renovated the interior for use as a restaurant, known appropriately as "The Old Library". Serving lunch and dinner, the restaurant featured a lounge with a square island bar on the first floor, and dining tables on the mezzanine. There was a game room, and the restaurant was decorated with books and shelves, alluding to the building's original purpose. The restaurant had a capacity of one hundred eighty, and did well initially, but it closed within a few years. In 1985, the Huntington Junior College moved into the building, where it remains in 2023.

Until 1915, a statue of a Union soldier stood in front of the library's southwest corner. Pictured in various postcards showing the library and its environs, the monument was probably erected by the Grand Army of the Republic in the 1890s. It vanished in mysterious circumstances in 1915, amid controversy over plans to construct a Confederate monument at Ritter Park. Witnesses reported seeing the statue loaded into a wagon, believing that it would be relocated to the park, but the statue was never seen again.

== Architecture ==
The structure is built in the Beaux-Arts style. It features two stories with a raised basement, with smooth gray ashlar walls. The building's design is distinctly neoclassical, and follows the Ionic order. The portico features paired columns supporting a pediment, with smaller pediments on the west and south sides. The east side is the plainest, and lacks a gable end or pediment.

On the frieze are inscribed the names of various authors and philosophers from classical antiquity to modern times. On the library's south side, facing Fifth Avenue, Socrates has pride of place directly above the portico, flanked by Homer to the left, and Plato on the right. On the west side of the building, facing Ninth Street, are Shakespeare (spelled "Shakspere"), Macaulay, Schiller, and Longfellow. The frieze is partially hidden by neighboring buildings on the north and east sides, but Franklin appears in the northwest corner, while Virgil and Goethe are inscribed on the east side, nearest Fifth Avenue. There may be as many as three additional names on the north frieze, but the entire east side is visible, due to the lack of a gable end on that side of the building, and it seems to be blank following Goethe. A similar list of names is inscribed above the windows of the Carnegie Library at Binghamton, New York, which also opened in 1904: Shakespeare, Homer, Plato, Virgil, Dante, Bacon, Hugo, Emerson, Lowell, Goethe, Schiller, Longfellow, and Hawthorne.

== See also ==
- Cabell County Public Library
- National Register of Historic Places listings in Cabell County, West Virginia
