= West Virginia University Libraries =

Coordinates: 39°37′59.6″N 79°57′14.0″W

The West Virginia University Libraries at West Virginia University consist of seven individual libraries located on various WVU campuses. The Downtown Campus library is on the WVU Downtown Campus. The Evansdale Library is located on the WVU's Evansdale campus. The Robert C. Byrd Health Sciences Library is located on WVU's Medical Campus. The George R. Farmer, Jr. Law Library is located on WVU's Law Campus. The West Virginia & Regional History Center is located on the Downtown Campus inside the Wise Library. Libraries not on the WVU campus include the Mary F. Shipper Library at Potomac State College in Keyser and the Beckley Library at the WVU Institute of Technology.

== Wise Downtown Library ==
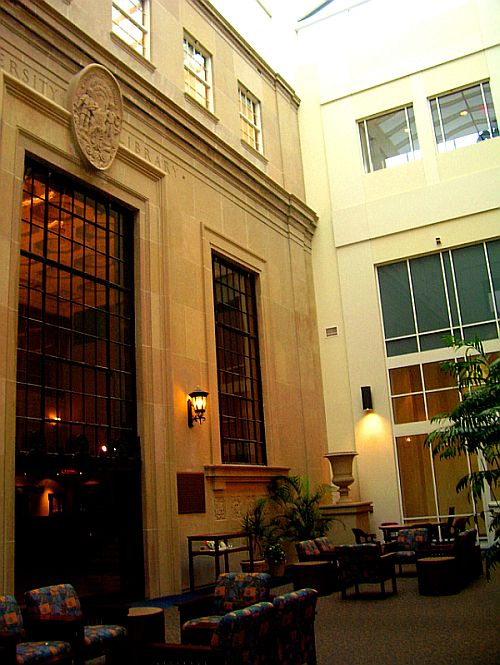
Wise Library

The Downtown Library Complex at West Virginia University was built in 1931. The original campus library was located in Stewart Hall, a Romanesque style building that could not accommodate the growing student population. University President John Roscoe Turner, among other university supporters, sought to build a new library. The University Library was then built on the former property of Israel Charles White, which today stands between White Hall and Clark Hall.

In 1984, the University Library was renamed Charles C. Wise, Jr. Library to honor Charles C. Wise, Jr., a lawyer and former student body president of WVU that had donated 4,260 acres (1,720 ha) of land to the WVU Foundation. A dedication ceremony was held on October 1, 1984.

In December 1996, a meeting was held to discuss a multimillion-dollar renovation and addition to the Charles C. Wise, Jr. Library. Located in the front of the original library, this addition encompassed 124,000 square feet (11,500 m^{2}) with five new levels added (four above ground). The Charles C. Wise, Jr. Library and the new addition are connected by an atrium. A large skylight filters sunlight into the room onto the original facade of the library. The library was completed in the spring of 2002. The building is now considered two separate libraries – Charles C. Wise, Jr. Library and Downtown Library. Since the origin of the Downtown/Wise Library, the complex has gained four floors of study rooms and computer workstations, rare collections housed in the Wise section of the library, and a coffee shop.

Services offered include inter-library loan and services and community access. The Libraries hired a Wikipedian in residence in 2015 to focus on the gender gap on Wikipedia and to increase the number of articles on women from West Virginia.

== Special collections ==
=== West Virginia and Regional History Center ===
The West Virginia and Regional History Center, the world's largest collection of West Virginia-related research material, is in the Wise Library on the Downtown Campus. The collection includes over 4.5 million manuscript documents, 30,000 books, 15,000 pamphlets, 1,200 newspapers, 100,000 photographs and prints, 5,000 maps, and 25,000 microfilms, oral histories, films and folk music recordings. The Center has an online digital collection, photographic archives, a rare books room, and various special collections including the International Association for Identification's library, which also has a digital collection, often called simply the "West Virginia Collection".

=== Appalachian Collection ===
Located in the James V. and Ann Pozega Milano Reading Room on the third floor of Wise Library, the Appalachian Collection consists of literature of the 13-state Appalachian region. The collection is named after the Appalachian Mountains which run from New York to Mississippi. Subjects include cultural stories of coal miners, music, pollution, crafts, traditions, wildlife, religion, and social conditions.

=== Government Information Services ===
Located on the first floor of the library in the Research Services department, Government Information Services includes publications from the state and federal government. Federal publications are gathered and processed at the Downtown Library and sent to other libraries by subject.

=== Literary Landmark ===
In October 2006, the Charles C. Wise, Jr. Library at WVU was made a Literary Landmark by the Friends of the Library Association U.S.A. (now United for Libraries) in partnership with WVU Libraries, in recognition of the university's connection with West Virginia poet laureate Louise McNeill Pease and its efforts to preserve her writings and personal papers in the West Virginia and Regional History Center. The plaque, hung in the atrium, reads:

The writings and personal papers of Louise McNeill, poet laureate of West Virginia from 1977 [sic 1979] to 1993, are housed in the West Virginia and Regional History Collection. McNeill is beloved for her depiction of West Virginia's life and lore in Paradox Hill, the historical Gauley Mountain and Elderberry Flood, and the autobiographical Milkweed Ladies."

== Gallery ==
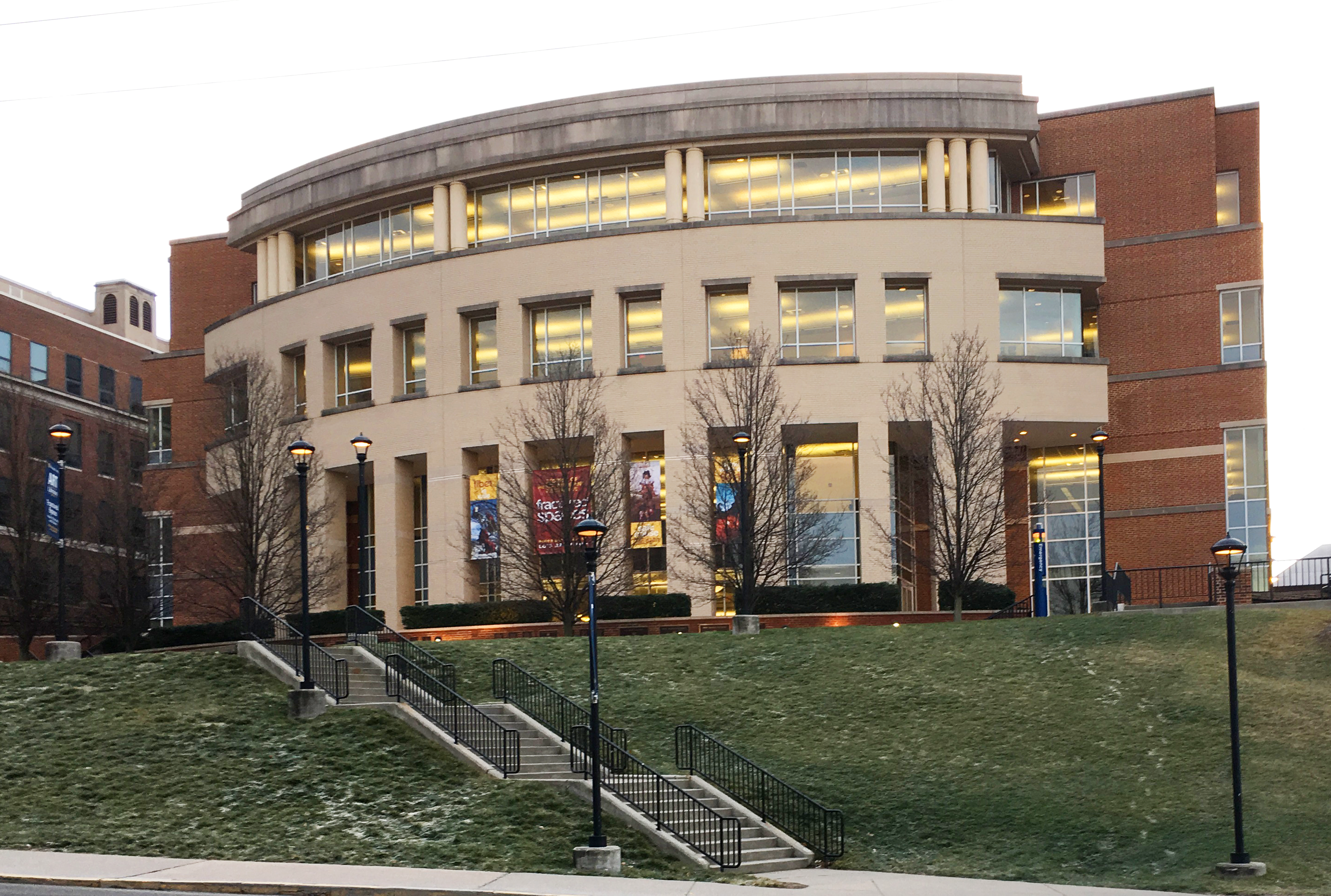
WVU Downtown Library

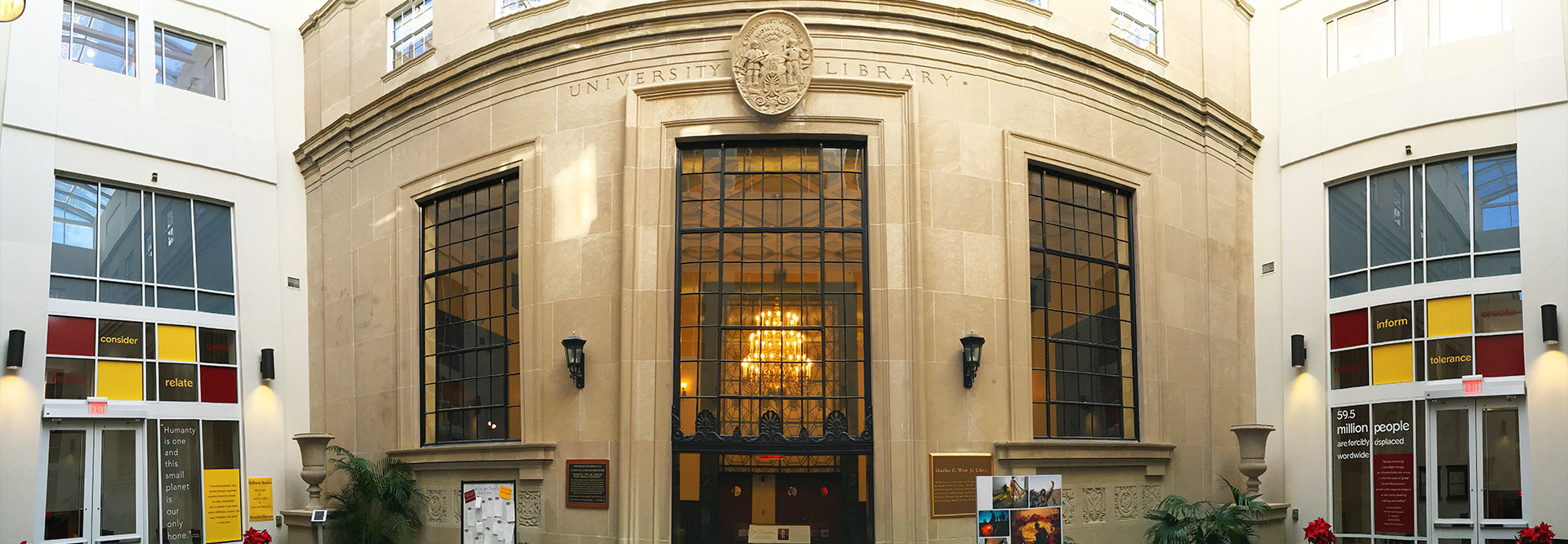
Original Wise Library exterior within the Downtown Library

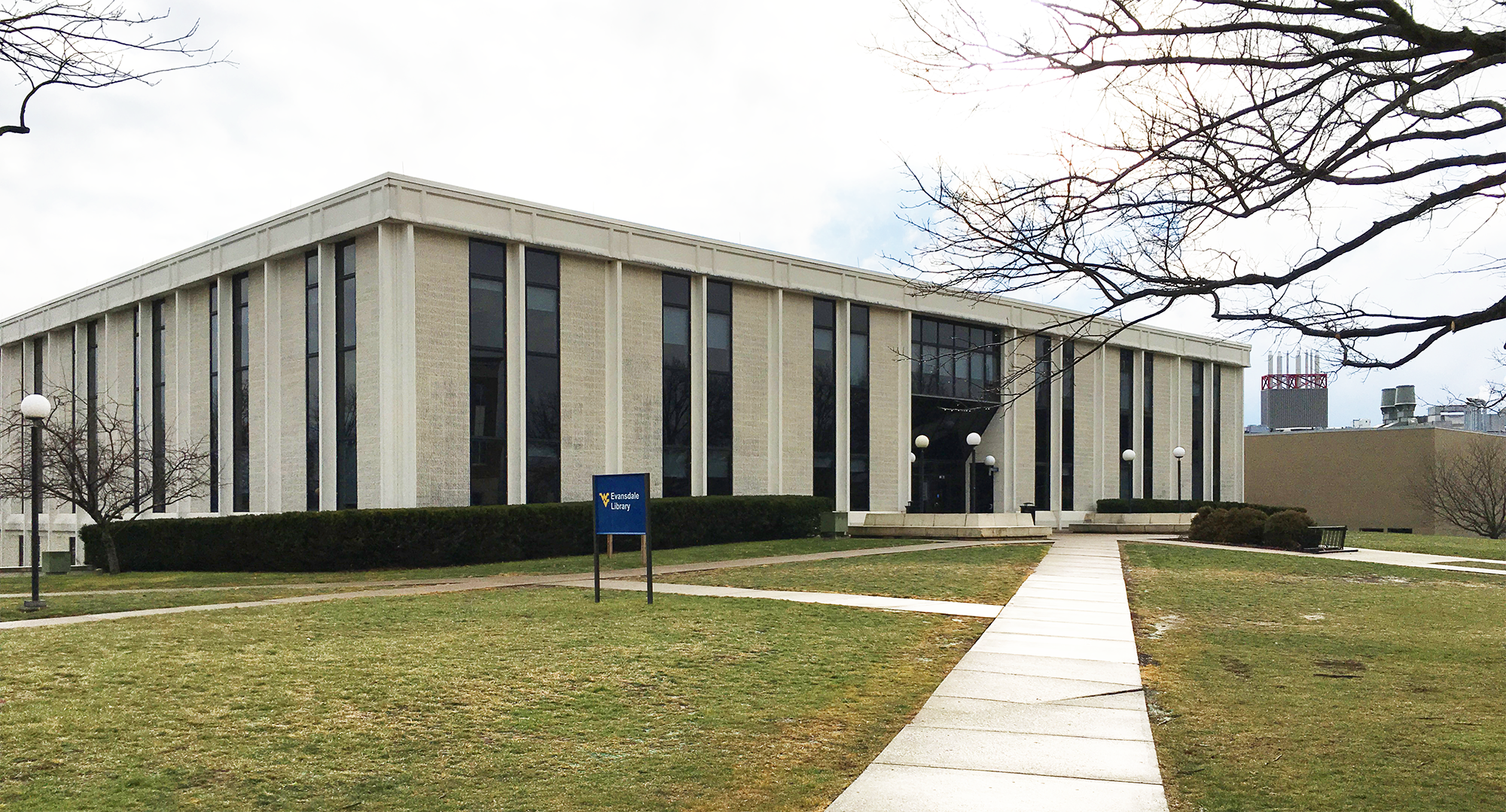
WVU Evansdale Library

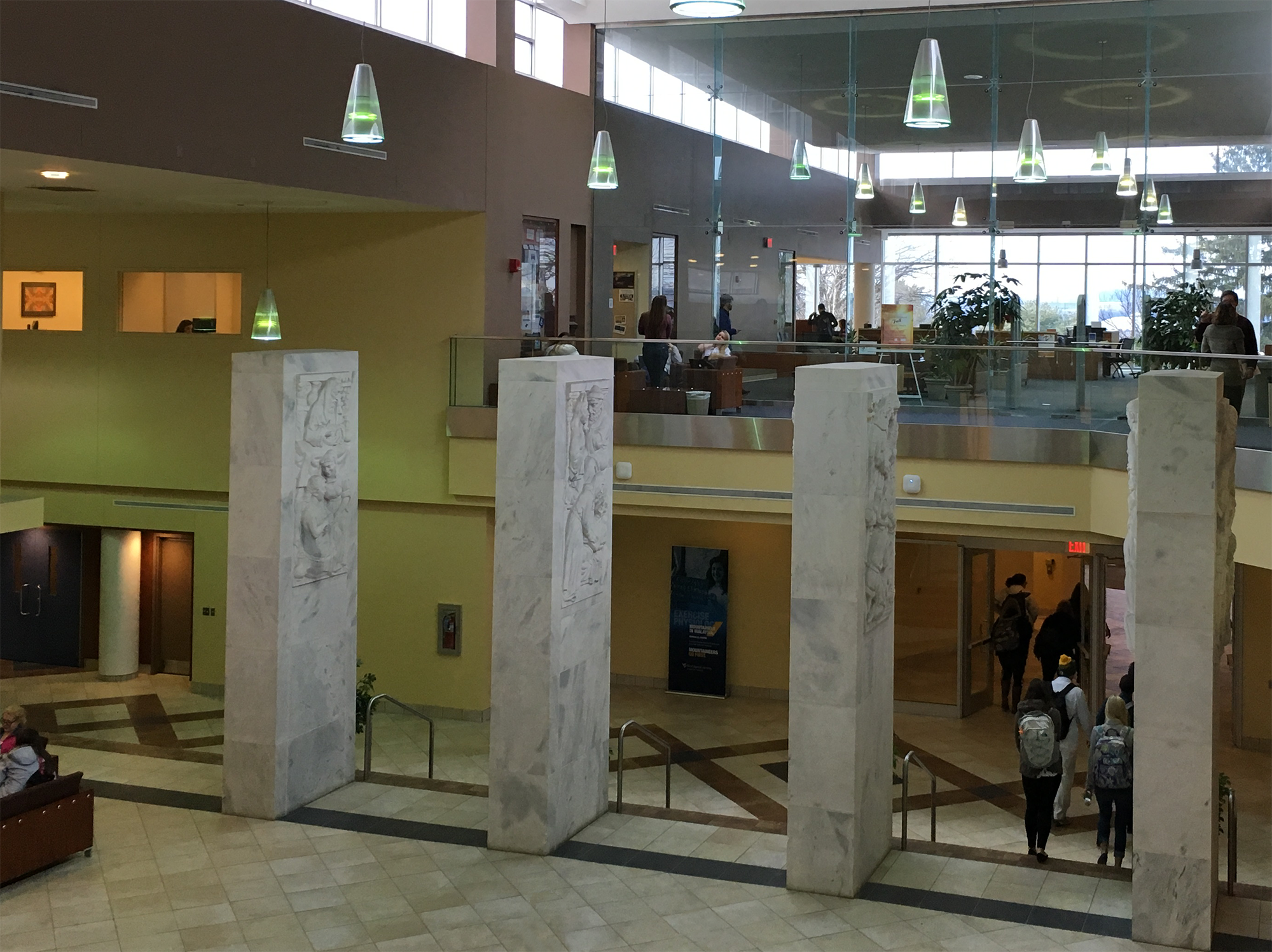
WVU Health Sciences Library

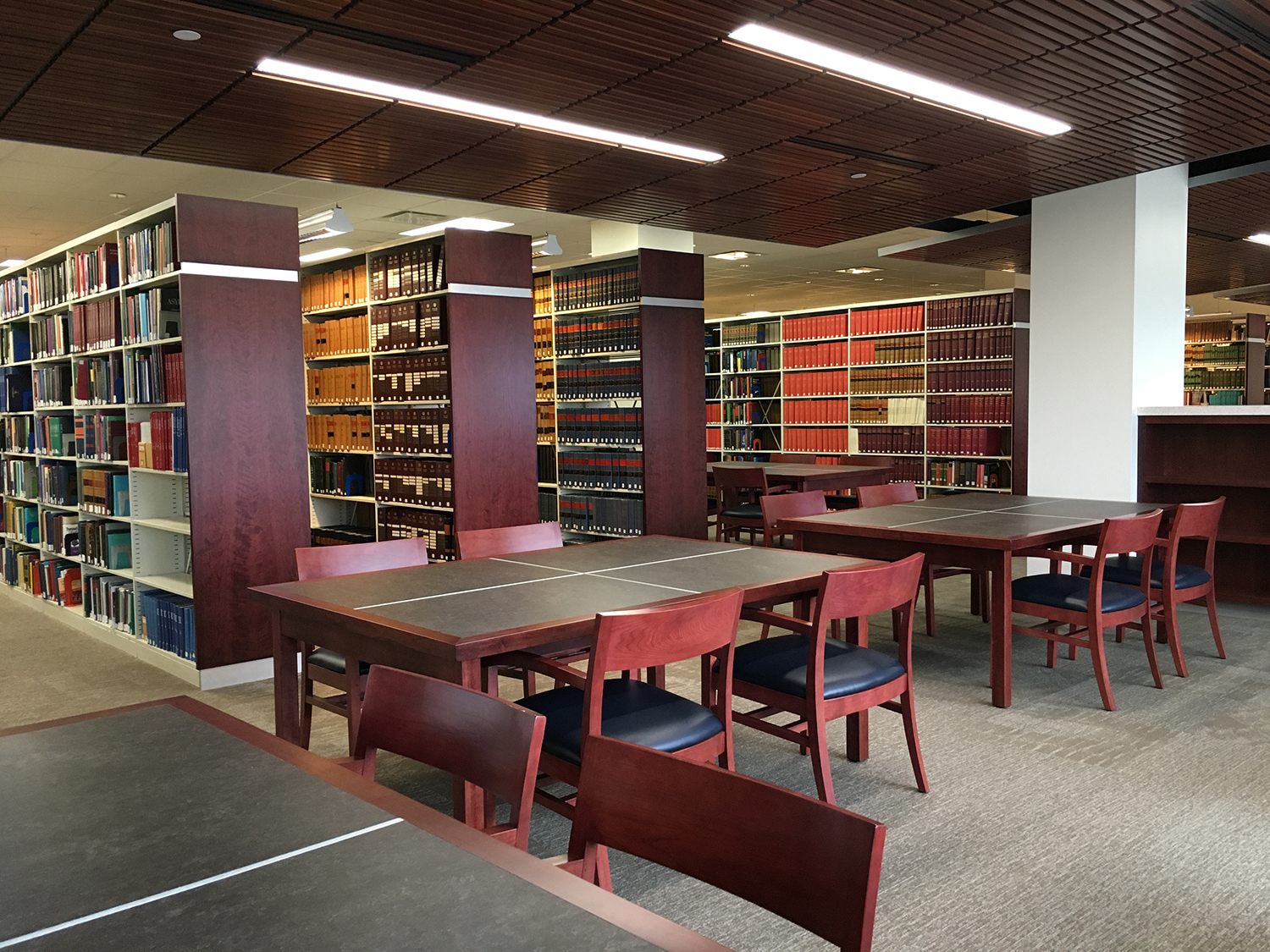
WVU Law Library

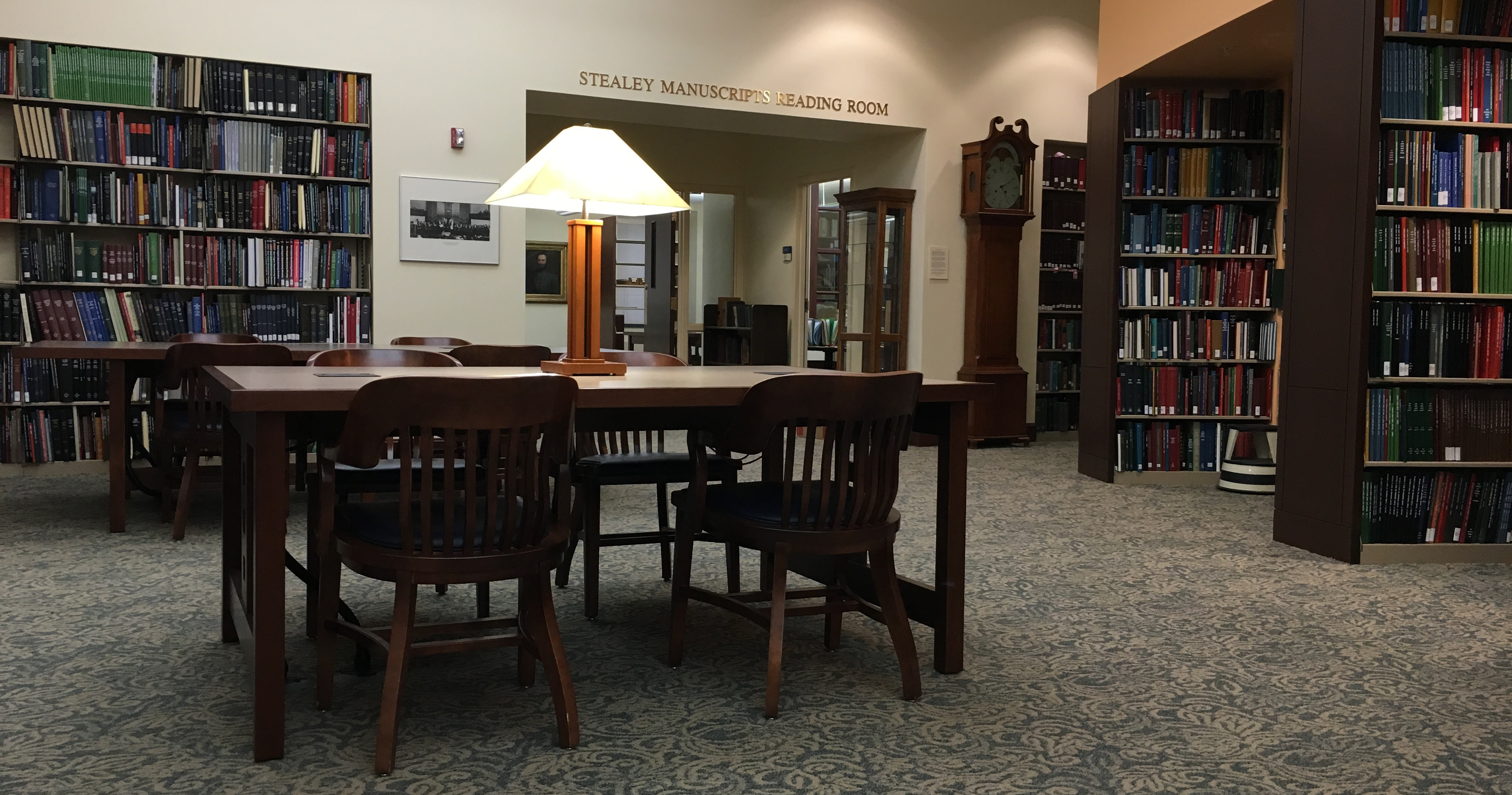
WVU History & Regional Center

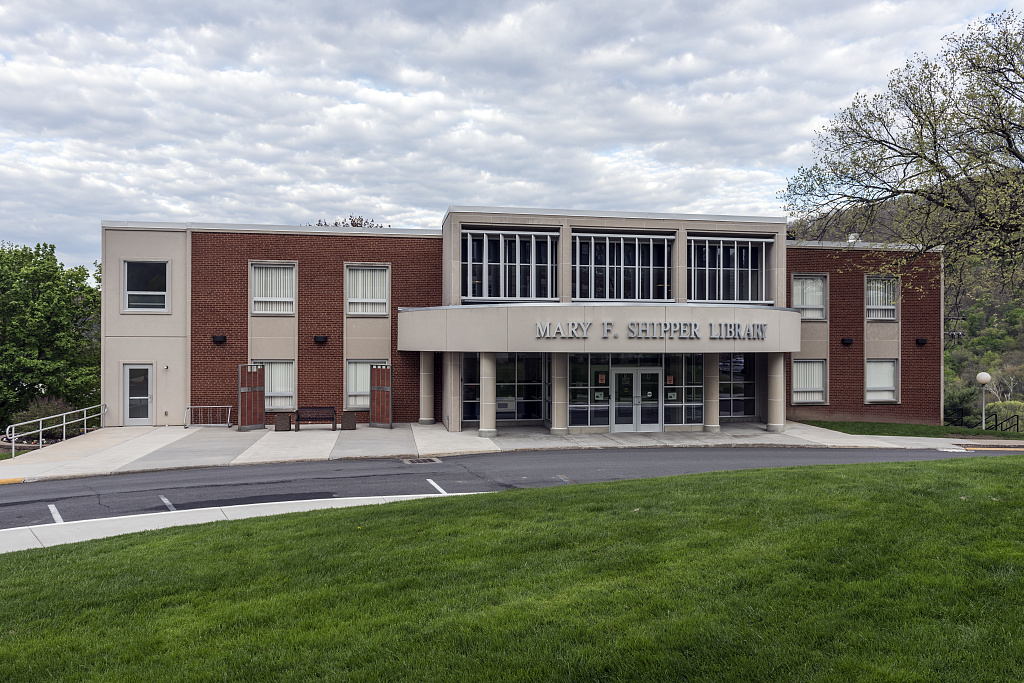
Mary F. Shipper Library
