= Huntington Junior College =

Private for-profit college in West Virginia, US

Coordinates: 38.419722°N 82.443333°W

- Type: Private junior college
- Established: 1936; 90 years ago
- Accreditation: HLC
- President: Frederic Fransen
- Chief Academic Officer: James Bennett
- Undergraduates: 151 (fall 2022)
- Location: Huntington, West Virginia, United States
- Campus: Carnegie Public Library Building (alternatively known as the former Cabell County Public Library building)
- Website: www.hjc.edu

Huntington Junior

College (HJC) is a private junior college in Huntington, West Virginia. It was founded in 1936 and its campus is currently located in the former Cabell County Public Library building. The college offers six associate degree programs as well as stackable certificates and micro-credentials. It is accredited by the Higher Learning Commission.

== History ==
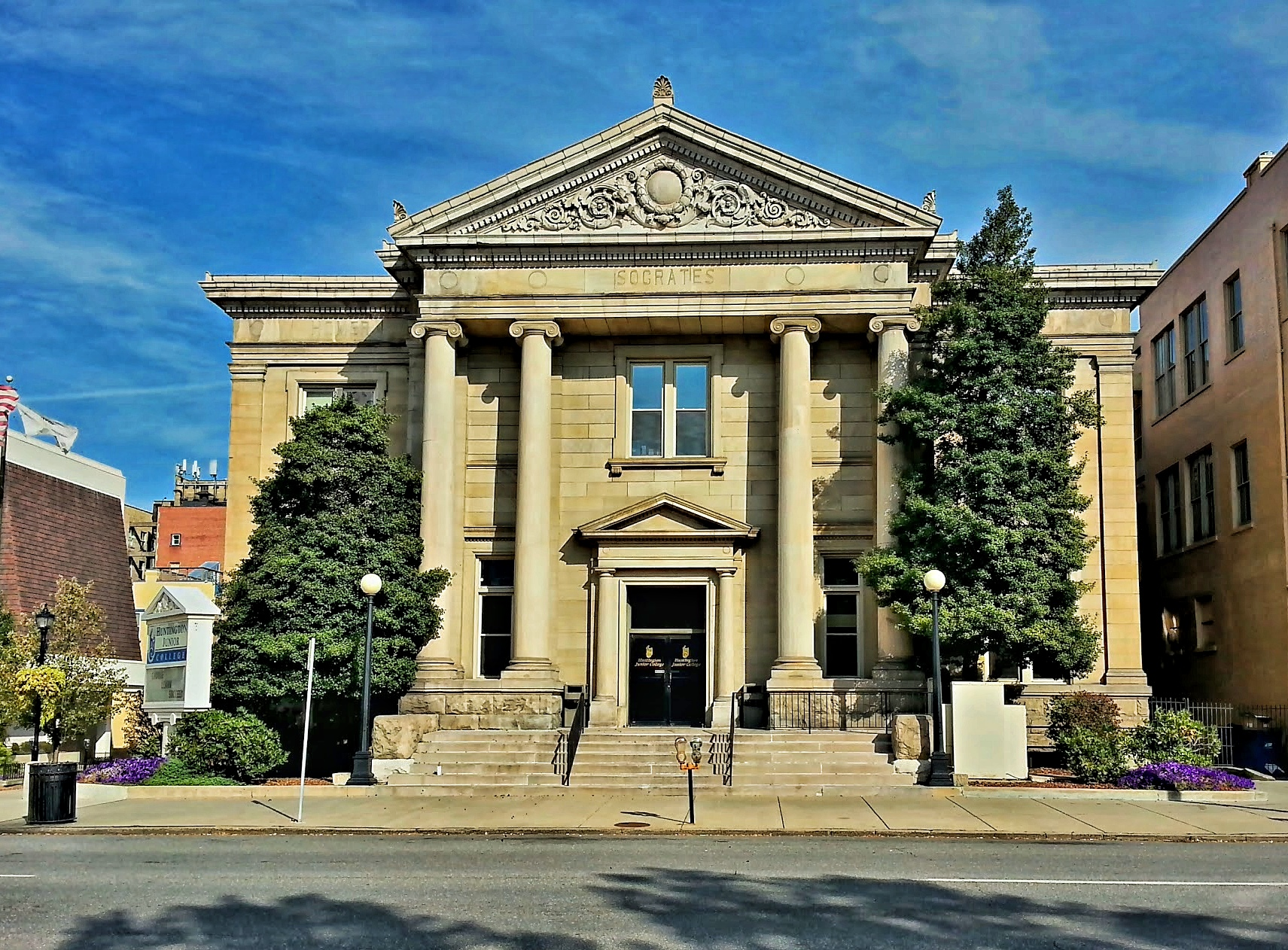
HJC is located in the former Cabell County Public Library building in Huntington, West Virginia.

During the mid-1930s, Huntington resident Chester A. Riley Jr. identified the need for an institution to prepare the city's workforce for the skilled manufacturing and office positions that were available as a result of the area's economic growth. Riley and his wife, Peggy, established Huntington Junior College in 1936 in downtown Huntington. On its opening day, the college's faculty consisted of two teachers and its student population consisted of five secretarial students. Its initial curriculum consisted of courses in shorthand, typing, and bookkeeping. For its first two years in operation, HJC was located at 920 Fifth Avenue, above the present location of Jim's Steak & Spaghetti House. Chester A. Riley Jr., served as the college's president for over 60 years.

Around 1980, HJC relocated to the former Cabell County Public Library building in downtown Huntington at the corner of Fifth Avenue and Ninth Street. The college renovated the library building to accommodate its academic programs while preserving the structure's historic integrity. On November 14, 1997, HJC was accredited by the Higher Learning Commission of the North Central Association of Colleges and Schools. HJC commemorated the 75th anniversary of its establishment on August 31, 2011. From its foundation in 1936 until 2011, more than approximately 5,200 people graduated from HJC. In September 2022, the college was re-accredited through the 2031–2032 school year by The Higher Learning Commission. The college was granted non-profit status in March 2023.

Carolyn Smith served as president and director of HJC until March 2022 when it was acquired by SensibleSchool, Inc. Frederic J. Fransen, the CEO of Certell, Inc. became president of HJC. Kiko Suarez was appointed Chief Academic Officer in June of that year.

== Academics ==
According to the Carnegie Classification of Institutions of Higher Education, HJC is classified as an "exclusively undergraduate two-year" associate's college.

HJC is accredited by the Higher Learning Commission. The college's Medical Assisting Program is accredited by the Commission on Accreditation of Allied Health Education Programs.

=== Administration ===
As of March 2022, Fred Fransen was the college's president. The college is also advised by a governing board consisting of community business and academic leaders. The governing board provides guidance on the college's curricula and general operations.

=== Curriculum ===
In the 2021–2022 academic year, HJC offered six associate degree programs in administrative technology, business management, dental assisting, medical assisting, medical coding, and substance use counseling. Most of these programs are offered through hybrid learning.

HJC utilizes the academic quarter calendar consisting of four three-month quarters of classes.

=== Admissions and tuition ===
HJC has an open admissions policy.

Full-time tuition during the 2021–2022 academic year was $10,050. In fall 2022, the college announced that it had frozen tuition for the third year in a row. The college has a 95% retention rate.

In 2019, HJC students had a student loan default rate of 6%, below the national average of 15.2% for similar schools.

== Student body ==
Demographics of the student body (fall 2012)
Demographic	Percentage
American Indian or Alaska Native	1%
Asian	0%
Black or African American	11%
Hispanic/Latino	0%
Native Hawaiian or other Pacific Islander	0%
White	82%
Two or more races	5%
Race/ethnicity unknown	1%
Non resident alien	0%

As of fall 2022, the student body totaled 151 students, according to the National Center for Education Statistics. The college has 6 full-time total faculty and 5 part-time faculty and a student-to-faculty ratio of 18 to 1. According to fall 2021 data on undergraduate student age, 15% of the college's students were aged 24 and under and 85% of students were aged 25 and over. Regarding the residence of the school's undergraduate students, 80% of students were in-state and 20% of students were out-of-state. The majority (86%) of the students enrolled at HJC are enrolled in distance education, with 56% enrolled only in distance education, and 13% not enrolled in distance education.

== Campus ==
HJC is located in the former Cabell County Public Library building in downtown Huntington. The Beaux-Arts style Carnegie library building was constructed between 1902 and 1903, with $35,000 of its funds donated by Andrew Carnegie. Cabell County Public Library vacated the building in 1980, after which, the edifice was listed on the National Register of Historic Places on April 3, 1980.

According to the United States Department of Education Institute of Education Sciences, HJC is classified as having a small city campus setting. There is no campus housing for the college's student population.

== See also ==
- List of colleges and universities in West Virginia
- List of junior colleges in the United States
