= Scarborough Library =

Public library in Scarborough, North Yorkshire, England

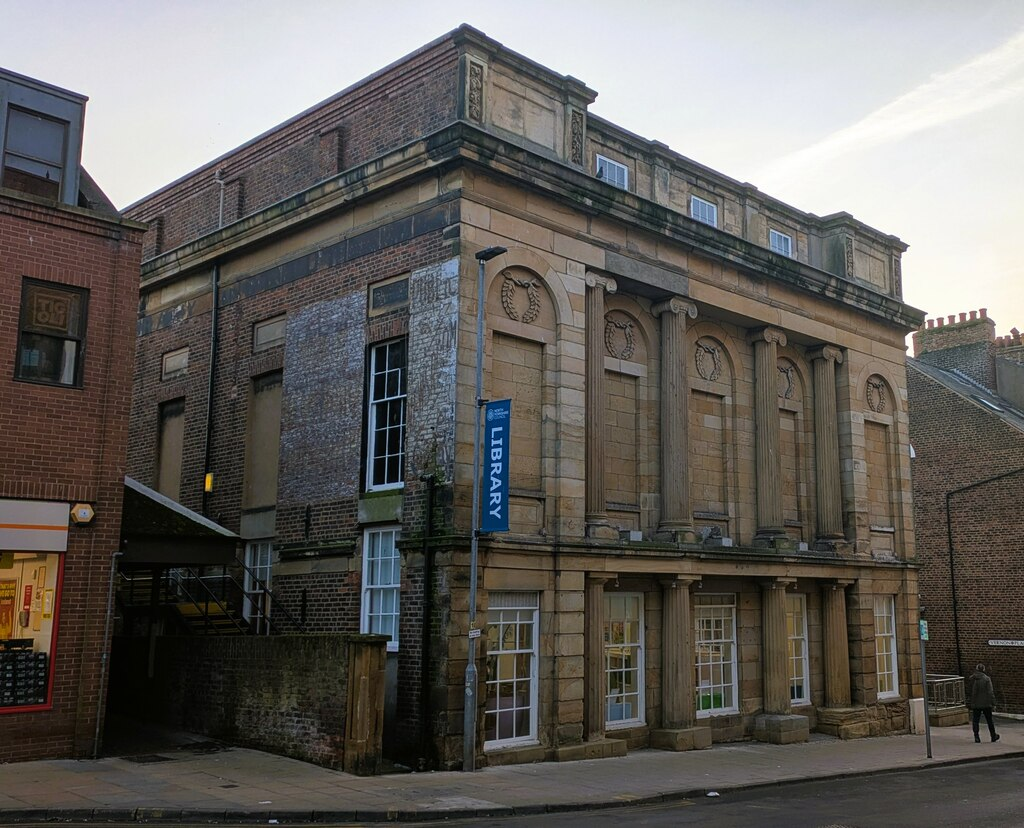
The library, in 2025

Scarborough Library is a historic public library in Scarborough, North Yorkshire, a town in England.

The Odd Fellows constructed a hall on Vernon Road in Scarborough in 1840. The building was designed by J. Gibson and W. Johnson, in a neoclassical style. It was soon converted into a mechanics' institute, and by 1856 it reported having 386 members, a library with 1,381 volumes, and a reading room with assorted periodicals. In 1930, it became the town's first public library. The interior was remodelled, and extended into an adjoining house. On the first floor, a large room housed a natural history collection, donated by James Jonathan Harrison. In about 1951, this was moved to Woodend House, and the room was converted into an events space. In 1955, Stephen Joseph established the UK's first professional theatre in the round in the room. Joseph died in 1967, and Alan Ayckbourn then led the company, which remained in the building until 1976. The building has been grade II listed since 1953.

The library is built of stone, with two storeys and five bays, the middle three bays recessed, and a canted bay on the right corner. In the centre of the ground floor are four Greek Doric columns and an entablature, and windows in all bays. The upper floor has four Ionic columns and an entablature, and in each bay is a recessed arched panel containing a wreath in the tympanum. At the top is a panelled parapet, projecting over the outer bays.

== See also ==
- Listed buildings in Scarborough (Castle Ward)
