= Cabell County Public Library =

Public library system in Cabell County, West Virginia

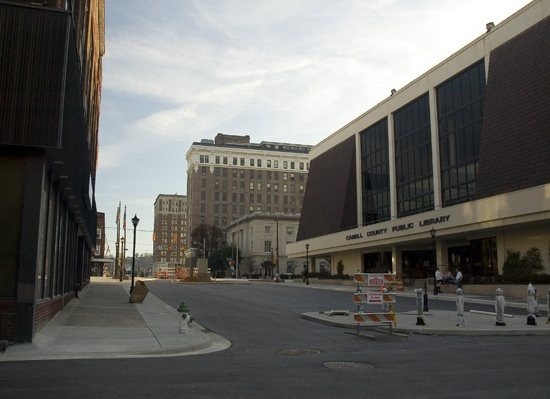
- Front view of the Cabell County Public Library in 2015 Side view of the Cabell County Public Library in 2006
- 38°25′11.294″N 82°26′38.293″W
- Location: 455 9th St, Huntington, West Virginia 25701
- Type: Public library
- Established: 1982
- Branches: 7

Access and use
- Circulation: 647,000
- Population served: 97,000

Other information
- Website: Official website

The Cabell County Public Library is a public library between Huntington City Hall and Carnegie Public Luibrary, that serves and is located in Huntington, West Virginia, United States.

== History ==
The Carnegie Public Library served Huntington, West Virginia from 1902, until the opening of the Cabell County Public Library in 1982.

The Cabell County Public Library was the first public library "to be automated with a computerized circulation system and online catalog" in West Virginia.

== Branches ==
Other branches of the Cabell County Public Library include:

- Barboursville Public Library
- Cox Landing Public Library
- Gallaher Village Public Library
- Guyandotte Public Library
- Milton Public Library
- Salt Rock Public Library
- West Huntington Public Library

== See also ==
- List of libraries in West Virginia
