= West Virginia Library Association =

Professional association for librarians in West Virginia

- Nickname: WVLA
- Formation: October 22, 1914; 111 years ago
- Tax ID no.: 55-6062061
- Parent organization: American Library Association
- Website: wvla.org

The West Virginia Library Association (WVLA) is a professional organization for West Virginia's librarians and library workers. It is headquartered in Parkersburg, West Virginia. It was founded on October 22, 1914, in Parkersburg, West Virginia at a meeting of the Federated Women's Clubs of West Virginia. S. Scollay Page, the state federation chair of literature and library extensions, invited librarians statewide to attend the meeting. The association was created and Page became its first president. WVLA was established as a state non-profit in 1980. The organization lobbied the state of West Virginia to create the West Virginia Library Commission, which was established in 1929 and facilitated the growth of public libraries in the state.

WVLA publishes West Virginia Libraries (ISSN 0043-3276).

== See also ==
- List of libraries in West Virginia
