= West Virginia Library Commission =

Official State Library of West Virginia

Agency overview
- Formed: 1929
- Jurisdiction: State of West Virginia
- Headquarters: 1900 Kanawha Boulevard East Culture Center, Bldg. 9 Charleston, WV
- Annual budget: $16,793,500
- Agency executive: Karen Goff, Executive Secretary
- Website: librarycommission.wv.gov

The West Virginia Library Commission (WVLC) Is the official State Library agency of West Virginia located in Charleston, West Virginia. It is overseen by a nine-member Library Commission appointed by the Governor. WVLC administers federal and state funds to the state's 172 public libraries as well as maintains the Statewide Library Network. Their Library Television Network Services produces television programming for state agencies and libraries, and produces local PSAs.

== History ==
The West Virginia legislature passed a bill in 1915 allowing cities and towns to levy taxes to create public libraries. The West Virginia Library Association supported this move but saw only fourteen public libraries established in this method between 1917 and 1930. The West Virginia Library Commission was created by the legislature in 1929 but not funded until 1941 after pressure from the State Federation of Women's Clubs. After the Library Services Act was passed 1956, the Library Commission could receive and distribute federal funding for public libraries.

== See also ==
- List of libraries in the United States
