= South Parkersburg, West Virginia =

South Parkersburg
- Unincorporated community
- Location within the state of West Virginia South Parkersburg (the United States)
- Coordinates: 39°14′12″N 81°32′32″W
- Country: United States
- State: West Virginia
- County: Wood
- Elevation: 636 ft (194 m)
- Time zone: UTC-5 (Eastern (EST))
  - Summer (DST): UTC-4 (EDT)
- GNIS ID: 1547088

South Parkersburg is an unincorporated community in Wood County, West Virginia, United States.
