= Mild intellectual disability =

Neurodevelopmental disorder

- Other names: Mild intellectual developmental disorder, mild mental retardation (obsolete)
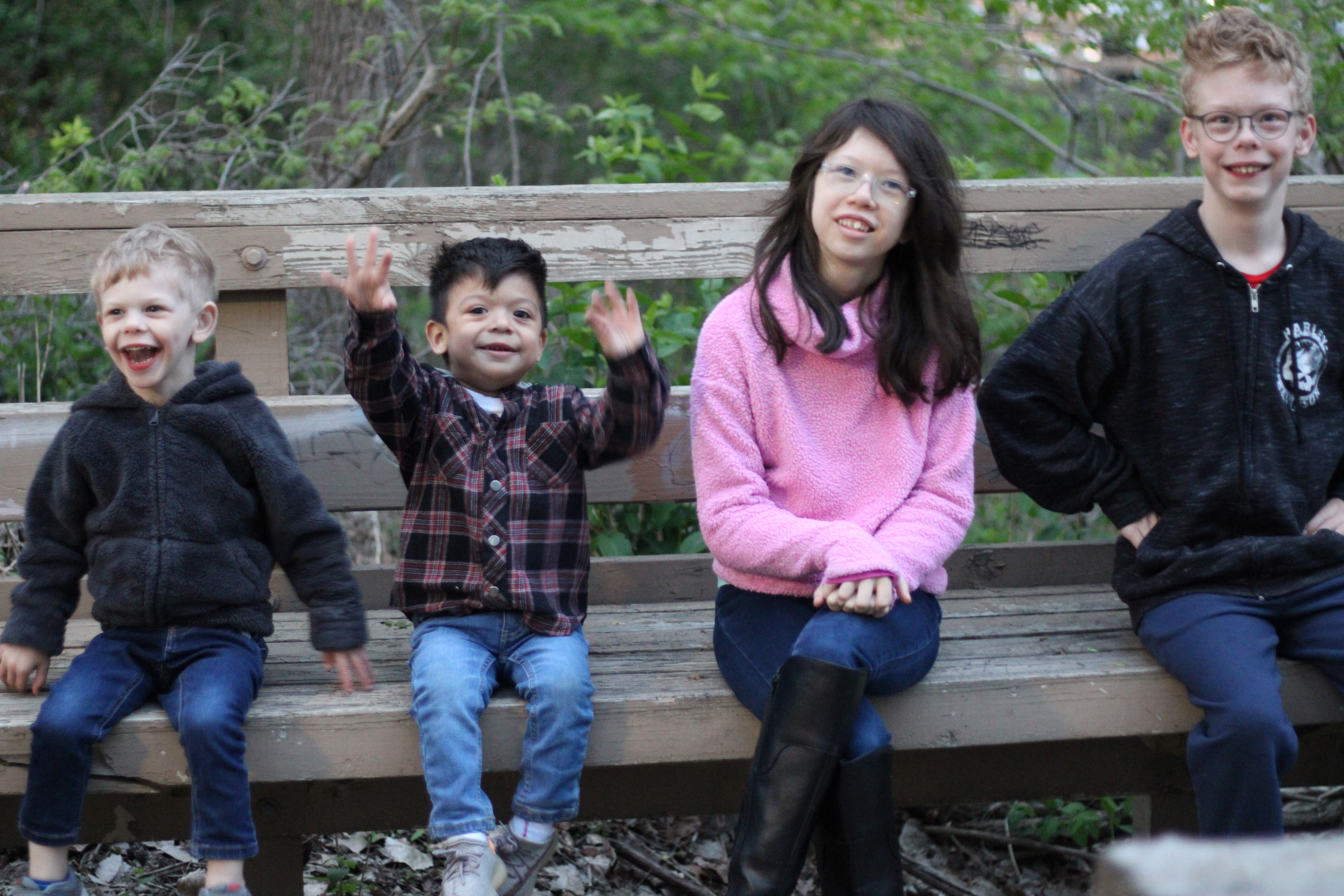
- A group of children with Williams syndrome, a common syndromic cause of mild intellectual disability.
- Specialty: Neuropsychology
- Symptoms: Developmental delay, slow rate of learning, conceptual difficulties, adaptive functioning deficits
- Usual onset: Before age 18 years
- Duration: Lifelong
- Causes: Inheritance, de novo mutations, birth injury, chromosomal disorders
- Risk factors: Family history, advanced paternal age, birth via primary Caesarean section, small size at birth, need for assisted ventilation after birth
- Diagnostic method: Developmental evaluation
- Differential diagnosis: Neurocognitive disorders, communication disorders, specific learning disorder, autism spectrum disorder
- Frequency: ~1%

Mild intellectual disability, also known as mild ID or mild intellectual developmental disorder and formerly as mild mental retardation, is a form of intellectual disability characterized by mildly impaired intellectual and adaptive functioning. Mild ID affects about 1% of the global population and is frequently hereditary, but can also be influenced by environmental factors and syndromic causes (such as Down syndrome). Many children with mild ID present as typically developing until school age, when they are often slower to learn than their peers and may have trouble with tasks involving memorization or abstract thinking. Outside of academics, they may also appear socially immature and need assistance with activities of daily living. By adulthood, most people with mild ID will have acquired academic skills similar to someone who has undergone 7-8 years of schooling. Many adults with mild ID can work and live alone, but may need help with more complex activities of daily living such as food preparation, money management, and organizing social events. Mild ID is comorbid with many disorders, particularly developmental. Common comorbidities of mild ID include attention-deficit/hyperactivity disorder, autism spectrum disorder, developmental coordination disorder, and cerebral palsy.

== Signs and symptoms ==
In early childhood, children with mild ID may be developmentally indistinguishable from typically developing children. They can usually understand concepts such as time, distance, money, and avoiding danger, but struggle with memorization tasks such as learning the names of the days of the week or remembering phone numbers. They may need assistance with social tasks related to theory of mind, but can generally demonstrate polite behavior and play with other children. They generally also need support in activities of daily living including toothbrushing, toileting, and bathing.

School-aged children and adolescents with mild ID often struggle with abstract problem-solving and may take longer than their peers to understand concepts such as arithmetic, reading, and writing. They may also have difficulty maintaining sustained attention for longer than 30 minutes. Socially, children and adolescents with mild ID often have a more concrete understanding of social situations than typical for their age and may need support to understand social cues or initiate conversation. By this age, most people with mild ID will be able to complete most activities of daily living independently.

By adulthood, most will reach academic skills expected for someone who has had 7-8 years of schooling. Mildly intellectually disabled adults may struggle with executive functioning and have trouble with complex activities of daily living, such as money management, food preparation, and shopping. Many adults with mild ID can work and live alone, and some can even raise a family with support. People with mild ID have similar recreational habits to people with normal intelligence. Socially, adults with mild ID may have trouble regulating their emotions and behavior in conversations and may appear socially immature. They are also at increased risk of social manipulation.

Many people with mild ID have an IQ between 55 and 70; however, the Diagnostic and Statistical Manual of Mental Disorders (DSM) states that diagnosis of a level of intellectual disability should be determined based on level of adaptive functioning, not IQ test scores.

== Causes ==
A specific biological cause is less likely to be found in cases of mild intellectual disability than for more severe forms of intellectual disability. Mild ID is also more likely to be inherited than other forms of ID, which often arise from de novo mutations. About 21% of cases of mild ID are caused by known genetic microdeletions and duplications. In comparison to more severe forms of ID, which are relatively stable in prevalence across populations, the incidence of mild ID varies widely based on external environmental factors, such as access to education and healthcare. Mild ID is also more likely to be nonsyndromic than more severe forms of ID.

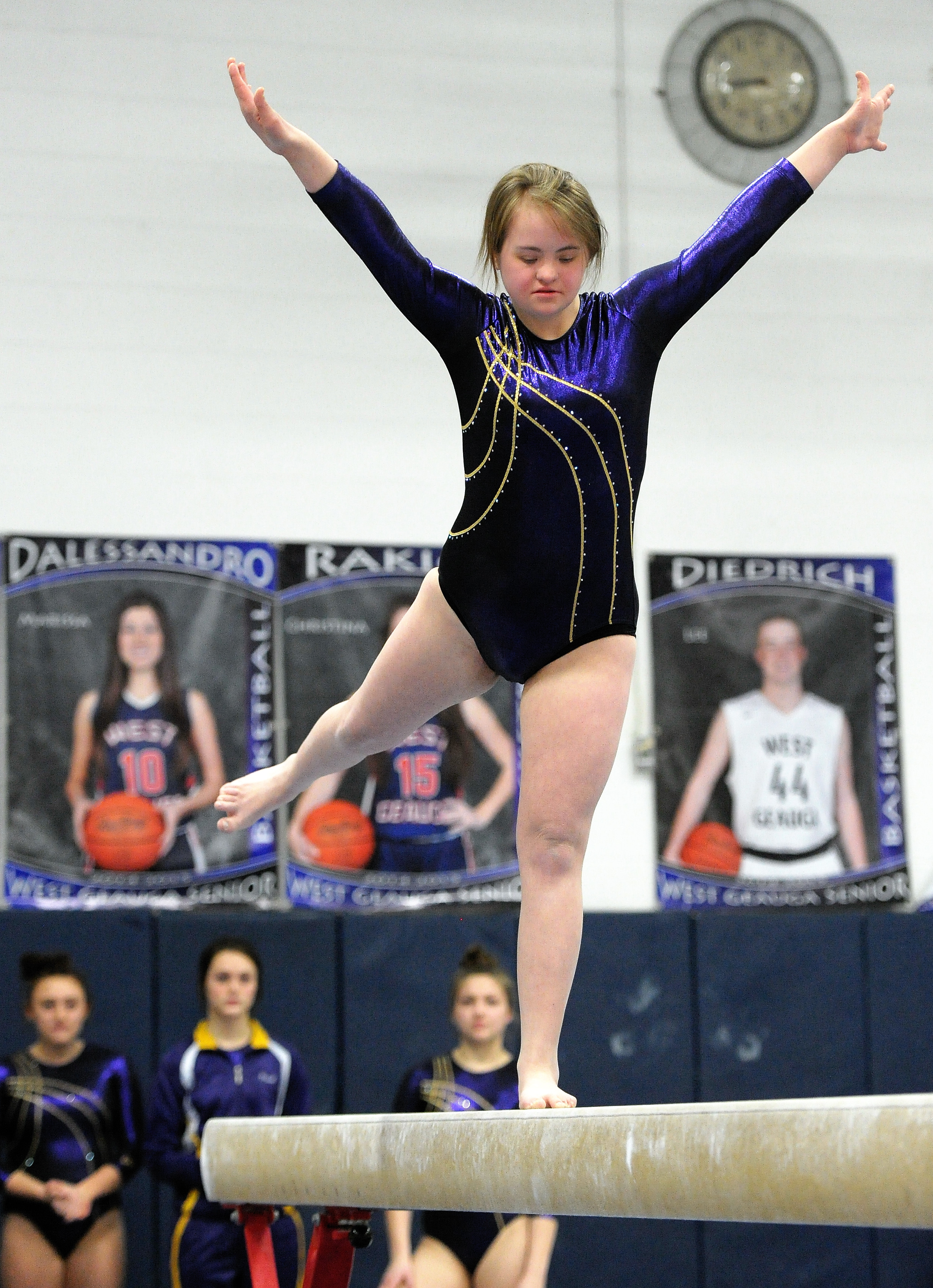
A girl with Down syndrome competing at a gymnastics competition in Chesterland, Ohio. Down syndrome is commonly comorbid with mild ID.

There are also many syndromic causes of mild ID. About 20-50% of adults with Down syndrome (DS) have mild intellectual disability. A lack of comorbid epilepsy, female sex, and lower levels of C-reactive protein are associated with milder levels of ID in people with DS. Young children with DS are also more likely to have a mild form of ID than adolescents with DS. Other genetic disorders can also lead to mild ID: for example, most children with Williams syndrome also have mild ID. Microcephaly is also considered a risk factor for mild ID, with one study finding a 14.7% incidence of mild ID in children with developmental disabilities and microcephaly, compared to 9.5% for children with developmental disabilities and normal skull size.

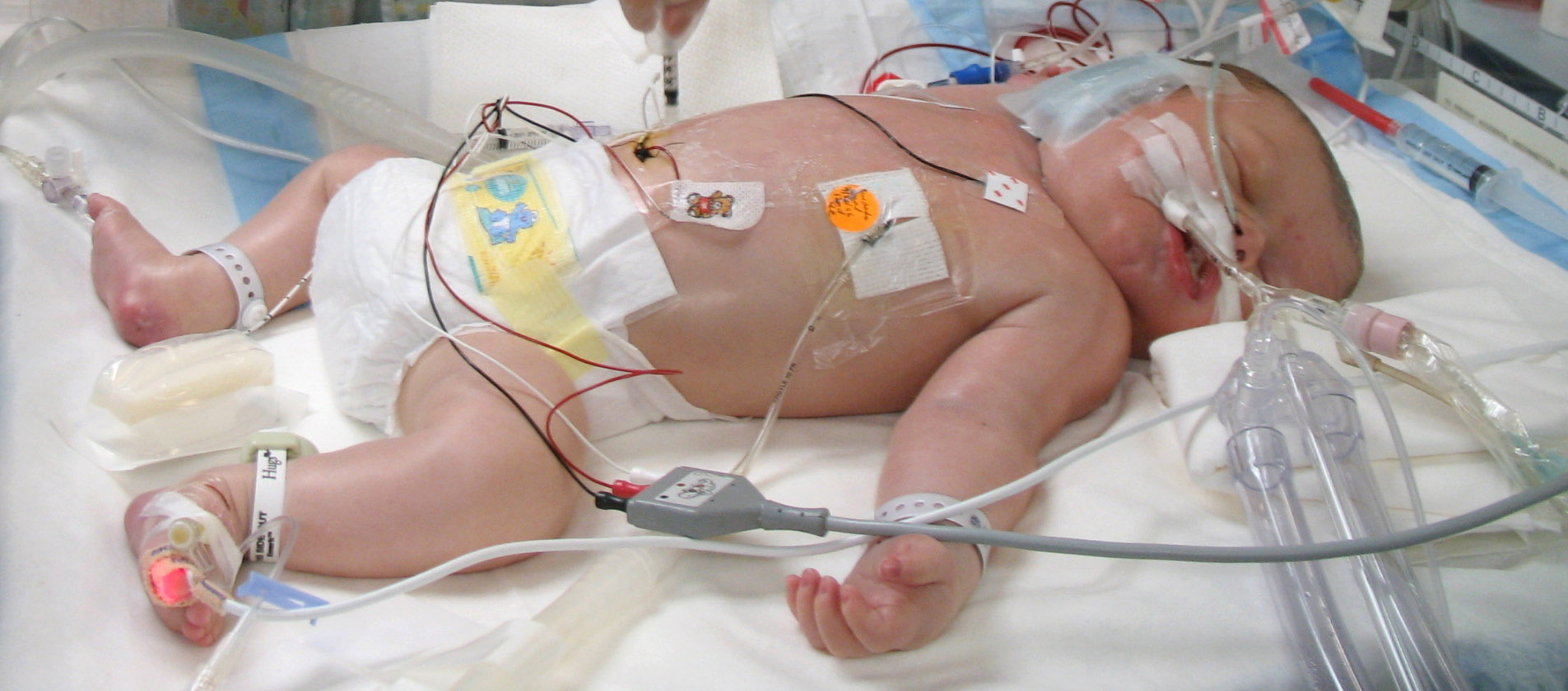
A newborn baby using assisted ventilation.

Birth injury and other birth-related factors can also increase mild ID risk. Advanced paternal age, uterine bleeding, birth via primary (first) Caesarean section, low Apgar score 5 minutes after birth, small size at birth for gestational age, and a need for assisted ventilation more than 30 minutes after birth are correlated with increased risk of mild ID.

== Prevalence ==
About 1 to 3% of the world population has some form of intellectual disability, of whom 85% have mild ID. Estimates of the prevalence of mild ID vary, and can be inflated by the use of an IQ test as the sole measure to determine a person's ID status, since an ID diagnosis requires both a low IQ score and adaptive functioning deficits.

Several factors can affect the incidence of mild ID. Male sex, low socioeconomic status, and family history increase the risk of mild ID.

Prevalence of mild ID also varies by location. In France, the incidence of mild ID is 18 per 1,000. In rural South Africa, it is 29.1 per 1,000. In the United States and other developed countries, the rate tends to be around 2.5-5.0 per 1,000.

== Comorbidities ==
=== Attention-deficit/hyperactivity disorder ===
The most common comorbid disorder of mild ID is attention-deficit/hyperactivity disorder (ADHD). One study of 111 Turkish children with mild ID found that 64.9% also had ADHD, the most common psychiatric comorbidity by a factor of almost 3. Children with ADHD and mild ID are also more likely to have oppositional defiant disorder and symptoms of conduct disorder than children with ADHD and no ID.

=== Developmental coordination disorder ===
Developmental coordination disorder (also known as dyspraxia) and motor delay are common in people with mild ID. One study found that about 82% of children with mild ID have motor skills below the sixteenth percentile for their age group. Another study found that 89% of children with mild ID have motor skills below the sixteenth percentile for their age group, 92% of whom have motor skills within the bottom five percent of same-aged children. Adults with ID also tend to have below-average motor skills and show little hand preference in hand-eye coordination tasks. A study of Korean adolescents with developmental disabilities found that teenagers with mild intellectual disabilities had similar levels of motor functioning to autistic teenagers.

=== Autism ===
Autism spectrum disorder is commonly comorbid with ID, including mild ID. About 24.1% of people with mild ID also have autism, but many of them do not get diagnosed until adolescence or later.

=== Cerebral palsy ===
Cerebral palsy (CP) is also associated with increased risk of mild ID, particularly among those with a GMFCS level of 3. About 16% of people with CP have mild ID.

== Risks ==
Children with mild ID in out-of-home care have a higher risk of sexual abuse than non-disabled children, with a frequency of 9.8 per 1,000 children. Among adults, the rate of sexual abuse is 24.3%. High-school students with mild ID are less likely to feel that they have the ability to share their opinions or make their own decisions or that working hard will lead them to attain their goals than students with learning disabilities and other, non-intellectual disabilities common among students receiving special education services. Older adults with mild ID are more likely to develop dementia than the general population: one study of mildly intellectually disabled older adults without Down syndrome found that 14.6% had dementia.
