= Conductive pedagogy =

Conductive pedagogy is pedagogy especially useful for disabled pupils like those with cerebral palsy. The main principles are:

- Accepting persons the way they are, recognize their qualities, respect their personalities and use the capacity and the power of their own minds.
- Humans inherit only faculties (dispositions) and these can be influenced by the environment and upbringing.
- Only persons who strongly believe that people are 'educable' can become conductors.
- The endeavors in the individual to do something represent pedagogic value.
- One has to be tolerant.
- A full life requires participation, segregation is unfulfilling.
- Centered on activities, only in the process of a meaningful activity will organize the nervous system. Creation of a successful co-ordination requires a purposeful action.
- Children's community where a positive atmosphere exist can be regarded as having upbringing goals.
- Prepare pupils to solve conflicts and correct resolution is a formative tool in the upbringing process. Try not to avoid them.
- For successful integration the pupils need to be able of independent physical movement, communicate and express their needs, mental abilities that fit the classes where to integrate, and social skills to work in a group or class.
- Children are both objects and the subjects and active participants in upbringing.
- Coordinate the professionals that work with different areas like senses, awareness, speech, movement and communication to create a united structure.

== See also ==
- Conductive education
