= Dyskinetic cerebral palsy =

Type of cerebral palsy associated with basal ganglia damage

- Other names: Athetoid cerebral palsy
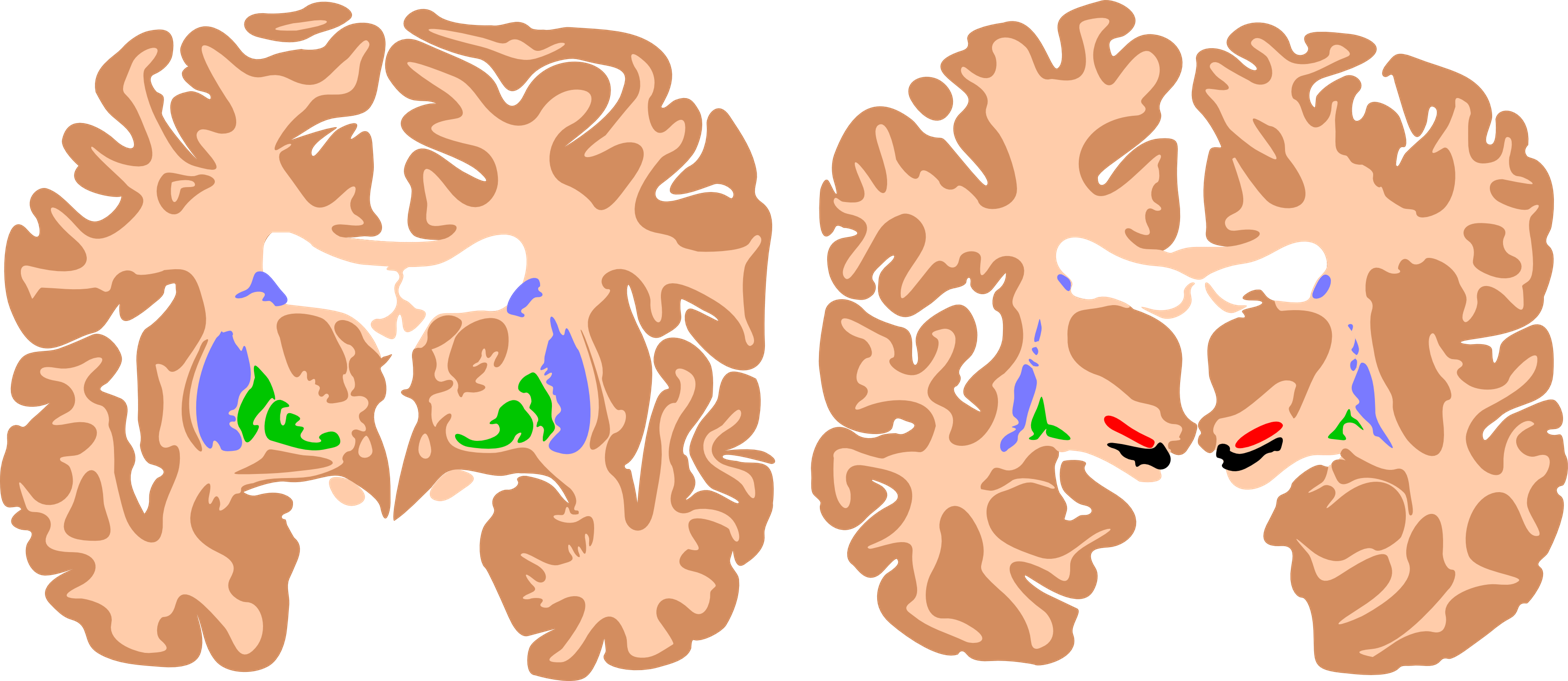
- The basal ganglia plays essential roles in voluntary motor function. Various forms of damage to the basal ganglia can cause a range of movement disorders.
- Symptoms: Dystonia, choreoathetosis
- Usual onset: Birth
- Duration: Lifelong
- Causes: Perinatal asphyxia, neonatal shock, hyperbilirubinaemia
- Treatment: Supportive

Dyskinetic cerebral palsy (DCP), also known as athetoid cerebral palsy or ADCP, is a subtype of cerebral palsy that is characterized by dystonia, choreoathetosis, and impaired control of voluntary movement. Unlike spastic or ataxic cerebral palsies, dyskinetic cerebral palsy is characterized by both hypertonia and hypotonia, due to the affected individual's inability to control muscle tone. Clinical diagnosis of ADCP typically occurs within 18 months of birth and is primarily based upon motor function and neuroimaging techniques. While there are no cures for ADCP, some drug therapies as well as speech therapy, occupational therapy, and physical therapy have shown capacity for treating the symptoms.

Like other forms of CP, it is primarily associated with damage to the basal ganglia in the form of lesions that occur during brain development due to bilirubin encephalopathy and hypoxic–ischemic brain injury.

Classification of cerebral palsy can be based on severity, topographic distribution, or motor function. Severity is typically assessed via the Gross Motor Function Classification System (GMFCS) or the International Classification of Functioning, Disability and Health (described further below). Classification based on motor characteristics classifies CP as occurring from damage to either the corticospinal pathway or extrapyramidal regions. Athetoid dyskinetic cerebral palsy is a non-spastic, extrapyramidal form of cerebral palsy (spastic cerebral palsy, in contrast, results from damage to the brain's corticospinal pathways).

== Presentation ==
In dyskinetic cerebral palsy (DCP), both motor and non-motor impairments are present. Impaired regulation of muscle tone, lack of muscle control, and bone deformations are often more severe compared to the other subtypes of cerebral palsy (CP). Severity of non-motor impairments is generally correlated with motor symptom severity.

The primary motor signs of DCP are dystonia and choreoathetosis. Dystonia is defined by twisting and repetitive movements, abnormal postures due to sustained muscle contractions, and hypertonia. Dystonia is aggravated by voluntary movements and postures, or with stress, emotion or pain. Choreoathetosis is characterized by hyperkinesia (chorea i.e. rapid involuntary, jerky, often fragmented movements) and hypokinesia (athetosis i.e. slower, constantly changing, writhing or contorting movements). Dystonia and choreoathetosis often occur concurrently in DCP. Both increase with activity and are generalized over all body regions with a higher severity in the upper limbs than in the lower limbs. Dystonia has a significantly higher level of severity in the distal parts of the extremities, whereas choreoathetosis is more equally distributed. Severity of dystonia but not choreoathetosis is correlated with higher levels of functional disability on the Gross Motor Function Classification System (GMFCS).

Approximately half of the individuals with DCP have severe learning disabilities. Epilepsy, visual impairments, and hearing impairments are reported in 51%, 45%, and 11% of individuals with DCP, respectively. Dysarthria or anarthria are also common.

Involuntary movements often increase during periods of emotional stress or excitement and disappear when the patient is sleeping or distracted. Patients experience difficulty in maintaining posture and balance when sitting, standing, and walking due to these involuntary movements and fluctuations in muscle tone. Coordinated activities such as reaching and grasping may also be challenging. Muscles of the face and tongue can be affected, causing involuntary facial grimaces, expressions, and drooling. Speech and language disorders, known as dysarthria, are common in athetoid CP patients. In addition, ADCP patients may have trouble eating. Hearing loss is a common co-occurring condition, and visual disabilities can be associated with Athetoid Cerebral Palsy. Squinting and uncontrollable eye movements may be initial signs and symptoms. Children with these disabilities rely heavily on visual stimulation, especially those who are also affected by sensory deafness.

== Causes ==
Dyskinetic cerebral palsy could have multiple causes. The majority of the children are born at term and experience perinatal adverse events which can be supported by neuroimaging. Possible causes are perinatal hypoxic-ischaemia and neonatal shock in children born at term or near term. Hyperbilirubinaemia used to be a common contributing factor, but is now rare in high-income countries due to preventive actions. Other aetiological factors are growth retardation, brain maldevelopment, intracranial haemorrhage, stroke or cerebral infections.

CP in general is a non-progressive, neurological condition that results from brain injury and malformation occurring before cerebral development is complete. ADCP is associated with injury and malformations to the extrapyramidal tracts in the basal ganglia or the cerebellum. Lesions to this region principally arise via hypoxic ischemic brain injury or bilirubin encephalopathy.

=== Hypoxic-ischemic brain injury ===
Hypoxic-ischemic brain injury is a form of cerebral hypoxia in which oxygen cannot perfuse to cells in the brain. Lesions in the putamen and thalamus caused by this type of brain injury are primary causes of ADCP and can occur during the prenatal period and shortly after. Lesions that arise after this period typically occur as a result of injury or infections of the brain.

=== Bilirubin encephalopathy ===
Bilirubin encephalopathy, also known as kernicterus, is the accumulation of bilirubin in the grey matter of the central nervous system. The main accumulation targets of hyperbilirubinemia are the basal ganglia, ocular movement nucleus, and acoustic nucleus of the brainstem. Pathogenesis of bilirubin encephalopathy involves several factors, including the transport of bilirubin across the blood–brain barrier and into neurons. Mild disruption results in left cognition impairment, while severe disruption results in ADCP. Lesions caused by accumulation of bilirubin occur mainly in the global pallidus and hypothalamus. Disruption of the blood–brain barrier by disease or a hypoxic ischemic injury can also contribute to an accumulation of bilirubin in the brain. Bilirubin encephalopathy leading to cerebral palsy has been greatly reduced by effective monitoring and treatment for hyperbilirubinemia in preterm infants. As kernicterus has decreased due to improvements in care, over the last 50 years the proportion of children developing athetoid CP has decreased. In most cases, will have normal intelligence.

== Diagnosis ==
Cerebral palsies have historically been diagnosed based on parental reporting of developmental motor delays such as failure to sit upright, reach for objects, crawl, stand, or walk at the appropriate age. Diagnosis of ADCP is also based on clinical assessment used in conjunction with milestone reporting. The majority of ADCP assessments now use the Gross Motor Function Classification System (GMFCS) or the International Classification of Functioning, Disability and Health (formerly the International Classification of Impairments Disease, and Handicaps), measures of motor impairment that are effective in assessing severe CP. The Barry-Albright Dystonia Rating Scale (BADS), the Burke-Fahn-Marsden Dystonia Rating Scale (BFMS) and the Dyskinesia Impairment Scale (DIS) are also commonly used to categorize clinical qualitative assessments of dyskinesia in DCP.

=== Neuroimaging ===
Magnetic resonance imaging (MRI) is used to detect morphological brain abnormalities associated with ADCP in patients that are either at risk for ADCP or have shown symptoms thereof. The abnormalities chiefly associated with ADCP are lesions that appear in the basal ganglia. The severity of the disease is proportional to the severity and extent of these abnormalities, and is typically greater when additional lesions appear elsewhere in the deep grey matter or white matter. MRI also has the ability to detect brain malformation, periventricular leukomalacia (PVL), and areas affected by hypoxia-ischemia, all of which may play a role in the development of ADCP. The MRI detection rate for ADCP is approximately 54.5%, however this statistic varies depending on the patient's age and the cause of the disease and has been reported to be significantly higher.

Multiple classification systems using magnetic resonance imaging (MRI) have been developed, linking brain lesions to time of birth, cerebral palsy subtype and functional ability. Around 70% of patients with DCP show lesions in the cortical and deep grey matter of the brain, more specifically in the basal ganglia and thalamus. However, other brain lesions and even normal-appearing MRI findings can occur, for example white matter lesions and brain maldevelopments. Patients with pure basal ganglia and thalamus lesions are more likely to show more severe choreoathetosis whereas dystonia may be associated with other brain lesions, such as the cerebellum. These lesions occur mostly during the peri- and postnatal period since these regions have a high vulnerability during the late third trimester of the pregnancy. Unfortunately, contemporary imaging is not sophisticated enough to detect all subtle brain deformities and network disorders in dystonia. Research with more refined imaging techniques including diffusion tensor imaging and functional MRI is required.

=== Motor function ===
Movement and posture limitations are aspects of all CP types and as a result, CP has historically been diagnosed based on parental reporting of developmental motor delays such as failure to sit upright, reach for objects, crawl, stand, or walk at the appropriate age. Diagnosis of ADCP is also based on clinical assessment used in conjunction with milestone reporting. The majority of ADCP assessments now use the Gross Motor Function Classification System (GMFCS) or the International Classification of Functioning, Disability and Health (formerly the International Classification of Impairments Disease, and Handicaps), measures of motor impairment that are effective in assessing severe CP. ADCP is typically characterized by an individual's inability to control their muscle tone, which is readily assessed via these classification systems.

== Prevention ==
Prevention strategies have been developed for the different risk factors of the specific cerebral palsy subtypes. Primary prevention consists of reducing the possible risk factors. However, when multiple risk factors cluster together, prevention is much more difficult. Secondary preventions may be more appropriate at that time, e.g. prevention of prematurity. Studies showed a reduced risk of cerebral palsy when administering magnesium sulfate to women at risk of preterm delivery. Cooling or therapeutic hypothermia for 72 hours immediately after birth has a significant clinical effect on reducing mortality and severity of neurodevelopmental disabilities in neonates with perinatal asphyxia. This has been documented for newborns with hypoxic-ischemic encephalopathy.

== Management ==
Dyskinetic cerebral palsy is a non-progressive, irreversible disease. The current management is symptomatic, since there is no cure. The main goal is to improve daily activity, quality of life and autonomy of the children by creating a timed and targeted management. The many management options for patients with DCP are not appropriate as standalone treatment but must be seen within an individualized multidisciplinary rehabilitation program. Medical treatment consists of oral medication and surgery. Before using oral drugs, it is important to differentiate between spasticity, dystonia, and choreoathetosis since each motor disorder has a specific approach. In general, many oral drugs have low efficacy, unwanted side-effects and variable effects.

Orthopedic surgery is performed to correct musculoskeletal deformities, but it is recommended that all other alternatives are considered first.

The previous management options need to be combined with rehabilitation programs, adapted to the specific needs of each individual. Typically, the team of caregivers can consist of physiotherapists, occupational therapists and speech/communication therapists. The therapy mainly focusses on the motor problems by using principles of neuroplasticity, patterning, postural balance, muscle strengthening and stretching. Non-motor impairments such as epilepsy require specific treatment.

=== Physical and occupational therapy ===
Physical therapy and Occupational Therapy are staple treatments of ADCP. Physical therapy is initiated soon after diagnosis and typically focuses on trunk strength and maintaining posture. Physical therapy helps to improve mobility, range of motion, functional ability, and quality of life. Specific exercises and activities prescribed by a therapist help to prevent muscles from deteriorating or becoming locked in position and help to improve coordination.

=== Speech therapy ===
Speech impairment is common in ADCP patients. Speech therapy is the treatment of communication diseases, including disorders in speech production, pitch, intonation, respiration and respiratory disorders. Exercises advised by a speech therapist or speech-language pathologist help patients to improve oral motor skills, restore speech, improve listening skills, and use communication aids or sign language if necessary.

=== Drug therapy ===
Oral baclofen and trihexyphenidyl are commonly used to decrease dystonia, although its efficacy is relatively low in most patients. Adverse effects of the latter can include worsening of choreoathetosis. Since dystonia predominates over choreoathetosis in most patients, reducing dystonia allows the possibility of a full expression of choreoathetosis. This suggests that the discrimination of dystonia and choreoathetosis is crucial, since misinterpretations in diagnosing can contribute to the administration of inappropriate medication, causing unwanted effects. Intrathecal baclofen pumps (ITB) are often used as an alternative to reduce side-effects of the oral dystonic medication over the whole body. Botulinum toxin injections may be applied to decrease dystonia in specific muscles or muscle groups.

Medications that impede the release of excitatory neurotransmitters have been used to control or prevent spasms. Treatment with intrathecal baclofen, a gamma-aminobutyric acid (GABA) agonist, decreases muscle tone and has been shown to decrease the frequency of muscle spasms in ADCP patients. Tetrabenazine, a drug commonly used in the treatment of Huntington's disease, has been shown to be effective treating chorea.

=== Deep brain stimulation ===
Deep brain stimulation (DBS) is a technique that uses electrodes placed in the brain to modify brain activity by sending a constant electrical signal to the nearby nuclei. Treatment of muscle tone issues via deep brain stimulation typically targets the global pallidus and has shown to significantly improve symptoms associated with ADCP. The specific mechanism by which DBS affects ADCP is unclear. DBS of the globus pallidus interna improves dystonia in people with dyskinetic CP in 40% of cases, perhaps due to variation in basal ganglia injuries.

DBS in patients with DCP has shown to decrease dystonia. However, the responsiveness is less beneficial and the effects are more variable than in patients with inherited or primary dystonia. The effects on choreoathetosis have not been investigated.

== Prognosis ==
The severity of impairment and related prognosis is dependent on the location and severity of brain lesions. Up to 75% of patients will achieve some degree of ambulation. Speech problems, such as dysarthria, are common to these patients.

== Prevalence ==
Dyskinetic cerebral palsy is the second most common subtype of cerebral palsy after spastic CP. A European Cerebral Palsy study reported a rate of 14.4% of patients with DCP which is similar to the rate of 15% reported in Sweden. The rate appeared lower in Australia, where data from states with full population-based ascertainment listed DCP as the predominant motor type in only 7% of the cases. The differences reported from various registers and countries may relate to under-identification of dyskinetic CP due to a lack of standardization in definition and classification based on predominant type.
