= Kuli Kohli =

Indian-British writer and poet

Dr. Kuli Kohli
- Born: December 15, 1970 (age 55); Jara Kothi Uttar Pradesh, India
- Citizenship: British
- Education: Honorary Doctor of Letters conferred by the University of Wolverhampton (2022)
- Occupations: writer, poet and novelist
- Known for: Patchwork (2016) 'A Wonder Woman' (2021)
- Spouse: Jaspal Kohli
- Children: 3, Akaash (son), Roshan (son), Prithvi (daughter)
- Website: www.kulikohli.co.uk

Dr. Kuli Kohli (born 1970) is an Indian-British disabled writer, poet, social activist and council worker of Punjabi descent. She is known for her literary works and has conducted several live performances. She was born with cerebral palsy, and confronts difficulties with handwriting, speaking, walking and hearing in her performances.

== Biography ==
Kuli (short for Kuldip) Kohli was born in 1970 in a rural remote village in the state of Uttar Pradesh, Northern India. She was born as the eldest child in her family and her birth was regarded as a curse in the typical Indian society which prefers a boy rather than a girl. It was also revealed that she was born with cerebral palsy and the neighbours suggested her parents to throw the child in the river. Kuli was almost thrown into the river until her father intervened physically to save her life.

She along with her family migrated to the UK in 1973 when she was just two and a half years old. She joined the Penn Hall Special School at the age of 3. She faced humiliation at her secondary school as she was referred by her schoolmates as "handicapped". She also struggled to communicate with her friends at school and was also advised by her teachers to learn to handwrite. However, Kohli left her school at the age of 16 after failing to obtain the required grades in most of her GCSE examinations.

== Career ==
She was enrolled in a youth training scheme after dropping out of school. After her marriage, she became a council worker in Wolverhampton. She pursued her career as a poet in around 2013 after being influenced by Simon Fletcher who was a literate development officer at Wolverhampton library. Simon mentored her for her poetry works and Kuli Kohli wrote a poetry titled Patchwork which was published in 2016 and then a full collection 'A Wonder Woman' published in 2021 by Offa's Press. She released a collection of her poetry titled The Rag Doll in 2013 and was self-published in 2014. She revealed that she was inspired to write a poem titled The Rag Doll as she was used to have a big rag doll during her childhood.

She established the Punjabi Women's Writing Group in the Black Country to empower Punjabi women in Wolverhampton, UK. She assisted Blakenhall Writers' Group and writes for Disability Arts Online.

In 2017, she gave her first live performance on stage about her work I have a dream which was a 15-minute set of poetry. In March 2020, she wrote a poem titled Black Country Wonder Woman for the Sandwell Stories/Stories I solation project after a request from Multistory commission. She wrote her debut novel Dangerous Games based on living with cerebral palsy in an Asian family. Her life story featured on BBC News homepage on 29 August 2020 titled They wanted to drown me at birth - now I'm a poet.
