= World Cerebral Palsy Day =

Annual day of affirmation

Cerebral Palsy Day is a social movement and a day to celebrate and affirm the lives of the 17 million people living with cerebral palsy (CP). The project was launched in 2012 by Cerebral Palsy Alliance (Australia) and United Cerebral Palsy (USA). It is supported by over 450 cerebral palsy service organisations, universities, parent groups, research institutions, student groups, schools and children's hospitals from 65 countries.

The first World CP Day campaign was called 'Change My World in 1 Minute'. The project sought ideas from the global community of people with CP for technologies and products that needed inventing - that had the potential to 'change the world' for people living with CP.

In 2012, more than 470 ideas were posted on the World CP Day website. Three ideas were shortlisted and then the call went out to inventors. A research team from the University of Virginia (USA) won the major prize. They developed a prototype solar powered wheelchair which was an idea posted by Alper Sirvan, a man with cerebral palsy in Turkey. The wheelchair prototype was presented to Alper on World CP Day 2013.

In 2015, the campaign evolved into a social movement that targets the six key issues that affect people with CP around the world, irrespective of geographical, cultural and economic differences. The website provides tools and resources for organisations to adapt and take action locally and, in doing so, builds the global movement for change.

The 2019 date for the observance is Sunday October 6.
