= András Pető =

Hungarian practitioner of physical rehabilitation

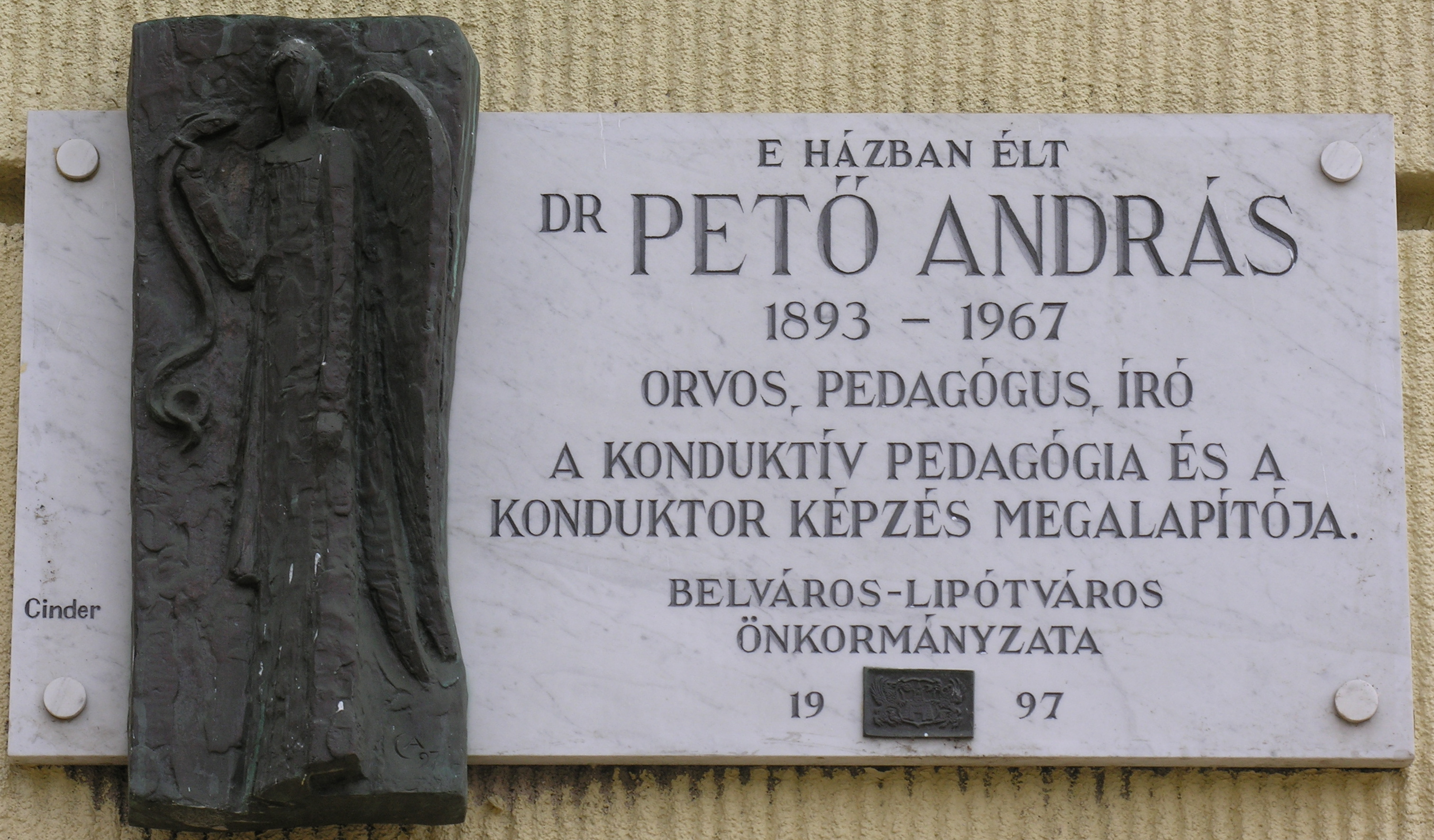
Plaque at a former residence

András Pető (11 September 1893 in Szombathely, Hungary – 11 September 1967 in Budapest, Hungary) was a practitioner of physical rehabilitation whose work provided the foundation for conductive education.

== Early life and career ==
András Pető was born in 1893 in Szombathely, Hungary, as an elder of three sons. His father fell ill in 1907 with Parkinson's disease, which compelled András to support the family financially. He worked as a tutor and a newspaper editor.

After graduation, he studied from 1911 in Vienna. Originally he to be a journalist, but in Vienna decided to study medicine. During his studies he met Jacob L. Moreno, doctor, playwright and psychotherapist, with whom he formed a lifelong friendship - and also came into contact with the various psychological schools of Vienna centered around Freud, Adler and Frankl.

Between 1930 and 1938, Pető published many literary, philosophical and medical works. He was the editor-in-chief of the periodical Biologische Heilkunst (Biological Healing) and was better known as a journalist than a physician.

The forced incorporation of Austria into Nazi Germany March 1938 made life difficult and dangerous for Jews, so he moved to Paris where he stayed briefly and worked as a journalist, then he returned to Hungary. Very little is known about Pető's life during the time of World War II but it is assumed that he was in hiding in Budapest during the German occupation. His mother was killed in Auschwitz.

== Institute ==
His institute, the National Institute of Motor Therapy, officially opened in 1952. Although nominally under the Ministry of Health, instead of following the medical model of providing therapies, Pető created a framework for an educational model, in which children with disabilities could have an education that met their particular physical and intellectual needs. Accordingly, in the early 1960s his institute moved into the Ministry of Education.

== Conductive education ==
Conductive education (CE) entered the wider public consciousness in the mid-1980s, as a result of two television documentaries —"Standing Up For Joe" (1986), and "To Hungary with Love" (1987).

In recent years, CE has gained more and more acceptance in the education of children with motor disorders. While developed first for children who had cerebral palsy or brain injury, it has also been used with adults with Parkinson's disease, multiple sclerosis and after-stroke conditions.
