= Multi-level fibrotomy =

Minimally invasive surgical procedure

Multi-Level Fibrotomy

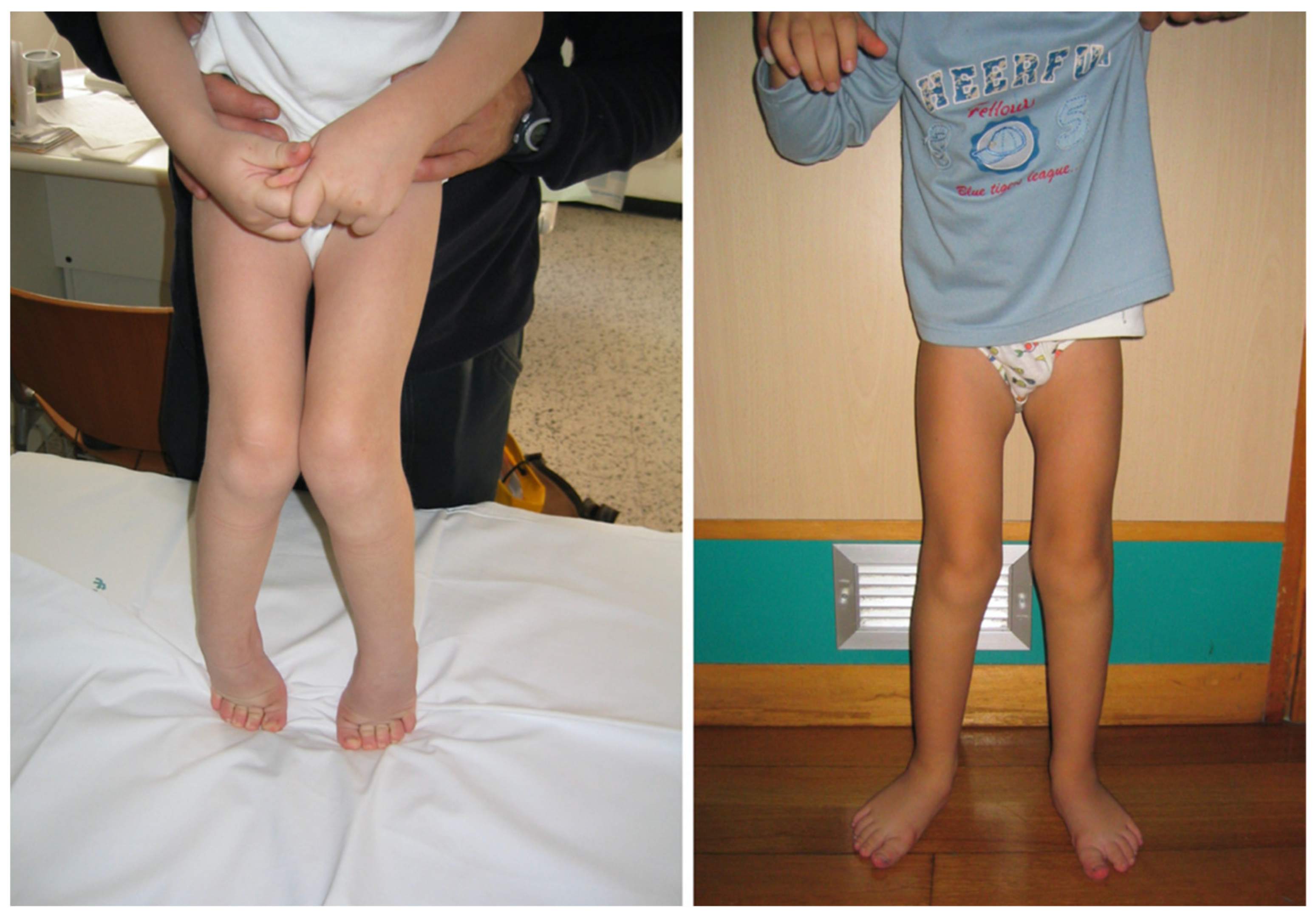

Multi-level fibrotomy is a conservative minimally invasive surgical procedure that consists in the exhaustion of the bands and muscle fibers affected by spasticity, in case these are due to difficulties in the physiological movement of a joint.

== History ==
Doctor Valerii Borisovich Ulzibat, a doctor born and raised in Mongolia who completed his studies in the city of Kemerovo, in southwestern Siberia, was the first surgeon to adopt a minimally invasive intervention technique in the treatment of motor disorders consequential to neurological complications.

In Italy, at the Bambino Gesù Children’s Hospital in Rome, Prof. Pier Francesco Costici and his team have modified the technique of gradual fibrotomy of Ulzibat, starting to use the ophthalmic scalpel, instrument usually used in high precision interventions involving cornea and sclera, and used in percutaneous fibrotomic surgery precisely because of its size.

== Surgical techniques ==
The surgery is carried out with the use of micro-scalpel, which allows to intervene on the muscle fibers without resorting to skin incisions reducing to a minimum the trauma related to the crossing of the skin. With the use of micro-scalpel, the surgeon intervenes directly on the muscle fascia and the muscle fibres, exhausting them until the desired correction is obtained. The skin accesses created do not require stitches.

== Results and health benefits ==
In a study published in 2021, a group of 189 pediatric patients with cerebral palsy, all operated on with Costici’s fibrotomy, was followed. The results showed that multi-level fibrotomy reduces postoperative pain with easier patient management, resulting in faster discharge from the hospital.

Between 2018 and 2022 were treated with Costici fibrotomy more than 500 patients with cerebral palsy at the Bambino Gesù Hospital in Rome; the results were similar to those obtained with the traditional "open-air" surgery but unlike there are no injuries, the pain is reduced significantly and patients can be discharged the day after surgery.
