= Ataxic cerebral palsy =

- The cerebellum (shown in red) is the region of the brain affected by ataxic cerebral palsy
- Specialty: Neurology

Ataxic cerebral palsy is clinically in approximately 5–10% of all cases of cerebral palsy, making it the least frequent form of cerebral palsy diagnosed. Ataxic cerebral palsy is caused by damage to cerebellar structures, differentiating it from the other two forms of cerebral palsy, which are spastic cerebral palsy (damage to cortical motor areas and underlying white matter) and dyskinetic cerebral palsy (damage to basal ganglia).

Because of the damage to the cerebellum, which is essential for coordinating muscle movements and balance, patients with ataxic cerebral palsy experience problems in coordination, specifically in their arms, legs, and trunk. Ataxic cerebral palsy is known to decrease muscle tone.

The most common manifestation of ataxic cerebral palsy is intention (action) tremor, which is especially apparent when carrying out precise movements, such as tying shoe laces or writing with a pencil. This symptom gets progressively worse as the movement persists, causing the hand to shake. As the hand gets closer to accomplishing the intended task, the trembling intensifies which makes it even more difficult to complete.

Like all forms of CP, there is no cure for ataxic cerebral palsy. However, there are a number of diverse treatments which together have been used to limit the negative effects of the condition. Like all forms of CP it is most common for ataxic cerebral palsy to be congenital, resulting from errors in the development of the cerebellum and connexins during pregnancy. However it is also possible to be acquired via meningitis or even by head trauma.

== Signs and symptoms ==
Due to impaired balance, patients who have ataxic cerebral palsy often walk with their feet unusually far apart (a wide gait). In addition, the low muscle tone caused by ataxic cerebral palsy causes people to appear very unsteady, as their body is constantly trying to counterbalance itself. Infants with the condition often take a significantly longer amount of time to be able to walk without support, and over 50% of all children with ataxic cerebral palsy experience some form of a learning disability or speech impediment.

The condition, whether resulting from cerebellar malformation or injury, results in incomplete cerebral development and no two people are affected in the same way. In general, cerebral palsy is a physical impairment that affects posture and the development of movement. Ataxic cerebral palsy in particular, is manifested in the performance of movements with abnormal force, rhythm, and accuracy. Patients have hypotonia (decreased muscle tone), signs of ataxia (loss of full control of bodily movement), impaired balance and coordination, intention tremors, and a wide-based gait (in walking patients).

Cerebral development typically occurs in the first two years of life when the infant is acquiring new motor and adaptive skills, consequently signs and symptoms of ataxic cerebral palsy begin to manifest during this time period. Typically patients fail to reach motor milestones and show a qualitative difference in motor development. During the neonatal period (first 28 days of life), children are noted to be lethargic, relatively immobile, and floppy. Moreover, hypotonia is greatest during this period, even though muscle tone increases with age, it never reaches normal levels. The limbs show weakness, incoordination in voluntary movement, dysdiadochokinesis (in inability to perform rapidly alternating movements), and titubation.

== Causes ==
Approximately 2-2.5 per thousand children born in the western world have cerebral palsy, with increasing incidence in twin and premature births. Ataxic cerebral palsy accounts for 5 to 10% of all cases. The cause of cerebral palsy, in particular its ataxic subtype is unknown, but thought to be due to malformation or damage in the cerebellum and its many connections,. The majority of cases that present malformation of the cerebellum are congenital, however acquired ataxic cerebral palsy can result from meningitis, trauma, birth complications, and encephalopathies (septic, acute, disseminated, and toxic). In addition, maternal viral infections may cause damage to the fetal brain due to increase in inflammatory cytokines produced during infection. Brain injury can occur during prenatal, perinatal, or postnatal periods. Most cases of cerebral palsy, approximately 80%, are acquired prenatally from unknown causes. Incidence increases with decreasing gestational period—fewer than 32 weeks of gestation and birth weight less than 5 lb. 8 oz. or 2.5kg.

== Diagnosis ==
Diagnosis of ataxic cerebral palsy is based on clinical assessment using standardized assessment tools. Diagnosis begins with the observation of slow motor development, abnormal muscle tone, and unusual posture in children that fail to reach developmental milestones. Diagnosis differs in adults and children because a child's brain is still developing and acquiring new motor, linguistic, adaptive, and social skills. The testing strategy is based on the pattern of development of symptoms, the patient's family history, and any factors that might influence the diagnosis, such as injury or trauma.

In children, assessment of infantile reflexes is also a diagnostic tool, such as the Moro reflex and the Romberg Test. The Moro reflex is rarely present in infants after 6 months of age and is characterized as a response to a sudden loss of support that causes the infant to feel like it is falling. The infant will respond by abduction and adduction (or spreading and unspreading) of the arms, as well as crying. The Moro reflex is significant in evaluating the integration of the central nervous system and patients with ataxic cerebral palsy will show a persistence and exacerbation of the reflex. In addition, patients with ataxic cerebral palsy will rarely show a positive Romberg test, which indicates that there is localized cerebellar dysfunction.

Physical diagnostic tests, such as cerebral imaging using Computerized Tomography (CT), Magnetic Resonance Imaging (MRI), and ultrasound are also useful, but not preferred to clinical assessments. These neuroimaging techniques can show brain abnormalities that have been found in previous patients with cerebral palsy, i.e., focal infarction and various brain malformations, however in a study of 273 children who were born after 35 weeks of gestation and underwent neuroimaging studies, one-third of the infants showed normal studies. In addition, infants undergo neuroimaging studies once the infant has neurological findings suggestive of cerebral palsy.

For developmental diagnosis in children and infants, there are a number of milestones of motor, linguistic, adaptive, and social behavior, such as.

1. When the child could sit up on their own with or without support
2. Say their first words
3. Feed themselves
4. Play successfully with children of same age

== Prevention ==
Current forms of prevention are focused during pregnancy, while others are focused immediately after birth. Some methods that have been used include prolonging the pregnancy using interventions such as 17-alpha progesterone, limiting the number of gestations during pregnancy (for pregnancies induced by assistive reproductive technology), antenatal steroid for mothers likely to deliver prematurely, high caffeine for premature births with extremely low birth weights.

== Treatment ==
Although no cure exists, there are many different treatments which are currently being used to help control symptoms. These include short-term treatment with some drugs (such as Botox) which relax the muscles, use of temperature changes to control muscle tremors, and a balanced approach of coordinated care and support involving physical therapists, orthopedic surgeons, and physiatrists.

Because there is no cure for ataxic cerebral palsy, current methods of treatment are diverse, often consisting of multiple focuses designed to limit the severity of symptoms. Many children with ataxic cerebral palsy are treated by teams consisting of individuals from numerous disciplines, including physical therapists, occupational therapist, orthopedic surgeons, and physiatrists. Treatment by such teams involves multiple approaches. Providing a primary care medical home to support children who have common symptoms of nutritional deficiencies, pain, dental care, bowel and bladder continence, and orthopedic complications is an essential aspect of treatment. In addition, utilizing diagnostic techniques to identify the nature and severity of brain abnormalities has become increasingly beneficial for treatment in recent years.

Different medications have been used to temporarily treat ataxic cerebral palsy. Medications like primidone and benzodiazepine, while not recommended for long term use, can alleviate some of the tremor symptoms. Botox which relaxes tightened muscles has been effective in treating voice, hand and head tremors. A few recently published papers outlined a potential method for treating intention tremor which consisted of cooling the forearm by wrapping it in a cryomanchet using a circulating fluid. After the treatment most patients experienced reduced tremor for up to half an hour. This practical, however short-term treatment can facilitate performing normal daily activities like applying make up, eating, or signing documents. This potential treatment method is also significant in that it reduces one's reliance on caregivers.

== History ==
The first documented clinical interest in childhood cerebellar disorders was seen in 1861 when the German pathologist Nikolaus Friedreich published his paper titled "familial spino-cerebellar degeneration." His further studies of the late 19th century noted symptoms including tremor, hypotonia, diminished or lost tendon jerks, and slurred speech. It was in 1897 when Freud, having studied Friedreich's work and other research of the time, suggested that there be a special category of cerebral palsy called ataxic cerebral palsy.

== Research ==
Numerous recent publications have provided evidence suggesting that increased aerobic exercise for children with ataxic cerebral palsy can improve physiological outcomes. More research is being conducted to better understand the specific mechanisms that may be responsible for this observation. Over the past half century, a significant amount of research has been focused on the use of stereotaxically placed lesions as a potential treatment method for ataxic cerebral palsy (the method had shown significant improvements in treating Parkinson's disease). Many studies suggested that lesions of the dentate nucleus produced an apparent reduction of symptoms, however the success of these studies did not attain the same level of success that was found when using the method to treat Parkinson's disease. With the improvement of brain imaging techniques in recent time, it may be possible in the future to utilize these techniques to identify specific sites of imbalance within the brain which could be treated with stereotaxically placed electrodes.

Improvements in both genetic studies and brain imaging techniques over the past few decades may suggest a promising future for treating ataxic cerebral palsy. It is now recommended by the American Academy of Neurology that all cases of cerebral palsy of unknown origin undergo neuroimaging. While this has been a somewhat controversial recommendation due to the lack of evidence behind the decision, it does appear that in the coming years neuroimaging will become an increasing aspect of both diagnosing and treating ataxic cerebral palsy.

Genetic studies have recently played a significant role in the research on ataxic cerebral palsy specifically. While it is estimated that only 2% of all forms of cerebral palsy are genetic forms of the disease, 50% of ataxic cerebral palsy is inherited as an autosomal recessive trait. Gaining a better understanding of the genes behind the disease suggests a future possibility of prenatal/premarital testing families and will greatly increase our understanding of the disease.
