= Conductive education =

Format of specialized education

Conductive education is an educational system, based on the work of Hungarian Professor András Pető, that has been specifically developed for children and adults who have motor disorders of neurological origin such as cerebral palsy.

CE is based on the premise that a person who has a motor disorder may not only have a medical condition requiring treatment, but may often also have a major problem in learning that requires special education. Its spread has been largely due to the advocacy of families; and research studies of its efficacy have so far been inconclusive.

== Origins of conductive education ==
Conductive education's origin lies in the works of Hungarian Professor András Pető, whose National Institute of Motor Therapy created a framework for an educational model in which children with disabilities could have an education that met their particular physical and intellectual needs.

Conductive education entered the wider public consciousness in the mid-1980s, as a result of two television documentaries — Standing Up For Joe (1986) and To Hungary with Love (1987).

== Goals ==
The goals of conductive education include assisting children in developing maximized orthofunction (the ability to conduct activities of daily living, such as dressing, eating, and self-care). The program also seeks to develop maximal independence in school, the community at large, and the workforce using minimal or no adaptive equipment. This program especially targets children under age six for maximal potential impact.

== Key principles ==
=== The child is a unified whole ===
The detrimental effects of a brain injury impede the whole development of the child, therefore practitioners of conductive education prefer a treatment that considers the individual as a unified whole and provides an overall, holistic intervention. Holistic means that everything in life, the total functioning of the individual, personal development and social organization, is seen as interdependent, interconnected, multi- leveled, interacting and cohesive. This idea of "whole" underpins the system from which Pető thought that children with motor disorders would benefit.

=== Targeting the whole personality ===
Allport wrote that "Personality is the dynamic organization within the individual of those psycho-physical systems that determine his characteristic and behavior and thought." This definition implies that personality is not just a sum of traits, one added to another, but rather that the different traits are held together in a special relationship to the whole. Dynamic implies that the individual's personality is constantly evolving and changing. From time to time and from one situation to another, there are changes in the structural organization which are influenced by the concept of self.

Conductive education attempts to build up the impaired children’s personalities gradually in a manner appropriate to their age. In Pető’s system, the individual is not a recipient of treatment, s/he is an active participant in the learning process. CE is conceived of as a partnership between educator and learners to create circumstances for learning- it is an all day learning process

=== Activity and intention ===
Pető asserted that restoring the interrupted learning process is not possible without the active participation of the individual, and that consequently passive exercises or patterns cannot change or improve the functional stage of the individual.

=== Continuity and consistency ===
In conductive education, continuity is considered necessary to reinforce a new skill. An opportunity to use the same skill for many different tasks is also considered essential. The system has to provide possibilities for children to practice emerging skills not only in specific learning situations but in the many inter-connecting, in-between situations of which life consists. In order to achieve this, CE turns any given part of a child’s day into a learning situation.

=== An interdisciplinary model ===
Pető believed that, in order to provide a unified treatment, it is vital that the group of professionals who are responsible for the program have training based on the same philosophy and relevant practice. Instead of a multidisciplinary approach, Pető applied an interdisciplinary model where a single specially trained group of professionals are responsible for the planning and implementation of the whole process.

== Components ==
Pető’s system consists of many interrelated facets, and conductive educators believe that conductive education works only as a unified system, not as a composite or amalgamation.

Conductive Education as a system has seven significant elements: Group, Facilitation, Daily Routine, Rhythmic Intention, Conductive Furniture, Task Series, and the Conductor.

== Research ==
Both a 2000 Swedish report, and a 2003 review concluded that according to the heuristic value in research, further research needed to be invited.

== See also ==
- Brain training
- Conductive pedagogy
- Addington School
- Psychobabble
