= Communication Function Classification System =

- Purpose: classification scale for those with Cerebral palsy

The Communication Function Classification System (CFCS) for individuals with cerebral palsy (CP) is a five-level classification system which began development at Michigan State University and currently under further refinement at the University of Kentucky. The research, organized and conducted by Dr. Mary Jo Cooley Hidecker, Ph.D., CCC-A/SLP, follows two widely used classification systems for cerebral palsy: the Gross Motor Function Classification System (GMFCS) and the Manual Ability Classification System (MACS). Dr. Ray Kent of the University of Wisconsin–Madison, Dr. Peter Rosenbaum of McMaster University, and Dr. Nigel Paneth of Michigan State University are also an integral part of this research.

== CFCS Variables ==
Design and development of the CFCS addressed a number of issues in cerebral palsy including a general lack of knowledge regarding the communication abilities of individuals with CP. The 5 CFCS levels are used instead of the more vague labels of "mild, moderate, severe, profound" difficulties. The system is designed to be a quick and simple instrument used by a person familiar with the individual to be classified. Variables of communication ability used within the CFCS include sender roles (being able to communicate a message to someone), receiver roles (being able to understand a message from someone), pace of communication, and the degree of familiarity with a communication partner. The CFCS follows the World Health Organization's (WHO's) International Classification of Functioning, Disability and Health (ICF).

== Purposes ==
Possible benefits of the CFCS include describing functional communication performance using a common language among professionals and laypersons and recognizing the use of all effective methods of communication including augmentative and alternative communication (AAC). The CFCS can be used in research projects as a way of describing the communication performance of participants. The CFCS can be used clinically by parents and professionals to open-up discussions regarding how different communication environments, partners, and/or communication tasks might affect an individual's CFCS level and to choose goals to improve the person's communication effectiveness.
