= The Clubfoot =

1642 painting by Jusepe de Ribera

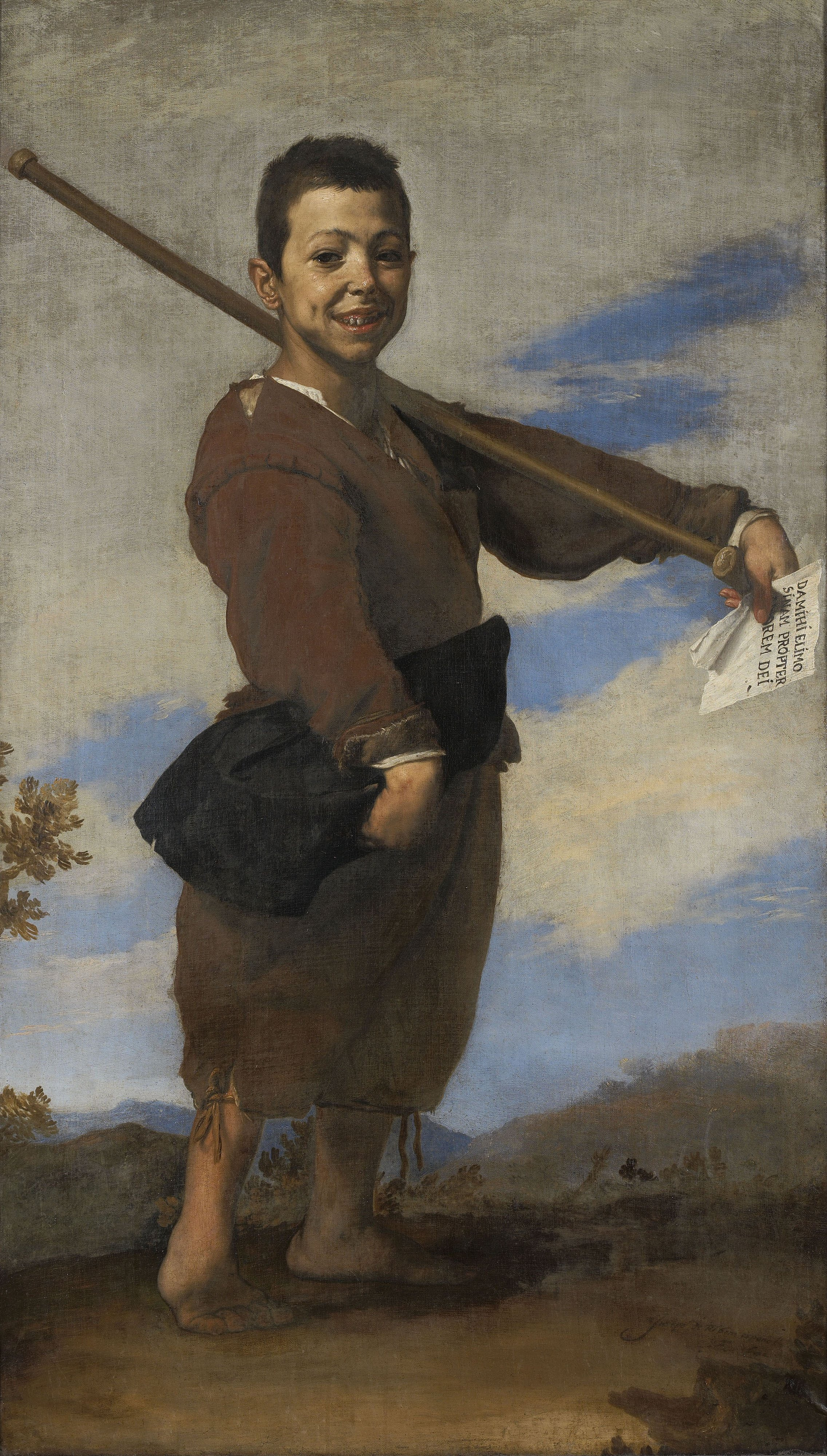
- Artist: Jusepe de Ribera
- Year: 1642
- Medium: Oil on canvas
- Dimensions: 164 cm × 92 cm (65 in × 36 in)
- Location: Louvre; Paris

The Clubfoot (also known as The Club-Footed Boy) is a 1642 oil on canvas painting by Jusepe de Ribera. It is housed in the Musée du Louvre in Paris (part of the La Caze bequest of 1869), and was painted in Naples. Art historian Ellis Waterhouse wrote of it as "a touchstone by which we can interpret the whole of Ribera's art".

Commissioned by a Flemish dealer, the painting features a Neapolitan beggar boy with a deformed foot. Behind him is a vast and luminous landscape, against which the boy stands with a gap-toothed grin, wearing earth-toned clothes and holding his crutch slung over his left shoulder. Written in Latin on the paper in the boy's hand is the sentence "DA MIHI ELEMOSINAM PROPTER AMOREM DEI" ("Give me alms, for the love of God").

== History ==
This is one of the Ribera's last works. Ribera had studied the composition of the Renaissance painters in Italy, and perhaps also the work of Flemish artists. Nevertheless, The Clubfoot conforms to a profoundly Spanish realist tradition. Moved by a Christian awareness of human weakness, Spanish artists often painted pictures of the poor and disabled. Here the young Neapolitan vagabond seems to be making game of his own infirmity; the clubfoot also informs the viewer that he is mute as well as crippled, as he appeals to the charity of the passer-by with a card written in Latin.

The motif is perhaps a derivation of taste for scenes of low life in art, as instituted by Caravaggio and followed by Ribera, who was his most fervent admirer in the realist vein in Naples.
