= Cerebral palsy =

Movement disorders that appear in early childhood

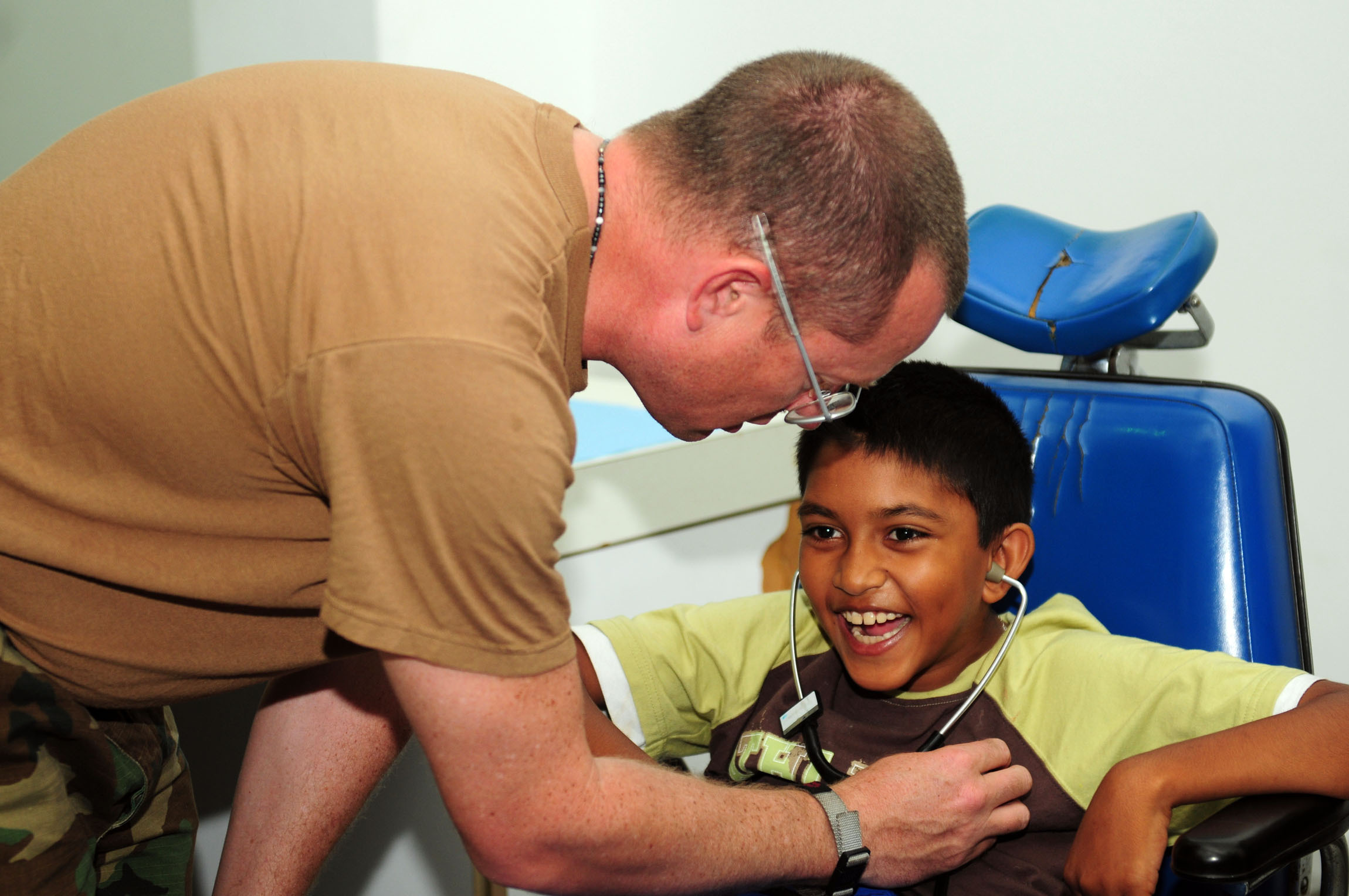
- A child with cerebral palsy being assessed by a physician
- Specialty: Pediatrics, Neurology, Physiatry
- Symptoms: Poor coordination, Stiff or loose muscles, weak muscles, tremors
- Complications: Epilepsy, intellectual disability, learning disability
- Usual onset: Prenatal to early childhood
- Duration: Lifelong
- Causes: Often unknown or brain injury
- Risk factors: Brain damage during infancy, preterm birth, being a twin, certain infections during pregnancy, difficult delivery
- Diagnostic method: Based on child's development
- Treatment: Physical therapy, occupational therapy, speech therapy, conductive education, external braces, orthopedic surgery
- Medication: Diazepam, tizanidine, botulinum toxin
- Frequency: 2.1 per 1,000

Cerebral palsy (CP) is a group of movement disorders that appear in early childhood. Signs and symptoms vary among people and over time, but include poor coordination, stiff muscles, weak muscles, and tremors. There may be problems with sensation, vision, hearing, and speech. Often, babies with cerebral palsy do not roll over, sit, crawl or walk as early as other children. Other symptoms may include seizures and problems with thinking or reasoning. While symptoms may become more noticeable over the first years of life, underlying problems do not worsen over time.

Cerebral palsy is caused by abnormal development or damage to the parts of the brain that control movement, balance, and posture. Most often, the problems occur during pregnancy, but may occur during childbirth or shortly afterwards. Oftentimes the brain will be damaged during prenatal neurodevelopment, and many times the cause is unknown. Risk factors include preterm birth, being a twin, certain infections or exposure to methylmercury during pregnancy, a difficult delivery, and head trauma during the first few years of life. A study published in 2024 suggests that inherited genetic causes play a role in 25% of cases, where formerly it was believed that 2% of cases were genetically determined. In lower- and middle-income countries, cerebral palsy is more prevalent.

Sub-types are classified, based on the specific problems present. For example, those with stiff muscles have spastic cerebral palsy, those with poor coordination in locomotion have ataxic cerebral palsy, and those with writhing movements have dyskinetic cerebral palsy. Diagnosis is based on the child's development. Blood tests and medical imaging may be used to rule out other possible causes.

Some causes of CP are preventable through immunization of the mother, and efforts to prevent head injuries in children such as improved safety. There is no known cure for CP, but supportive treatments, medication and surgery may help individuals. This may include physical therapy, occupational therapy and speech therapy. Multiple small studies in China have found improved outcomes with the application of Mouse NGF, and the treatment has been available in China since 2003. Medications such as diazepam, baclofen and botulinum toxin may help relax stiff muscles. Surgery may include lengthening muscles and cutting overly active nerves. Often, external braces and Lycra splints and other assistive technology are helpful with mobility. Some affected children can achieve near normal adult lives with appropriate treatment. While alternative medicines are frequently used, there is no evidence to support their use. Potential treatments are being examined, including stem cell therapy. However, more research is required to determine if it is effective and safe.

Cerebral palsy is the most common movement disorder in children, occurring in about 2.1 per 1,000 live births. It has been documented throughout history, with the first known descriptions occurring in the work of Hippocrates in the 5th century BCE. Extensive study began in the 19th century by William John Little, after whom spastic diplegia was called "Little's disease". William Osler named it "cerebral palsy" from the German zerebrale Kinderlähmung (cerebral child-paralysis). Historical literature and artistic representations referencing symptoms of cerebral palsy indicate that the condition was recognized in antiquity, characterizing it as an "old disease".

== Signs and symptoms ==
Cerebral palsy is defined as "a group of permanent disorders of the development of movement and posture, causing activity limitation, that are attributed to non-progressive disturbances that occurred in the developing fetal or infant brain." While movement problems are the central feature of CP, difficulties with thinking, learning, feeling, communication and behavior often co-occur, with 28% having epilepsy, 58% having difficulties with communication, at least 42% having problems with their vision, and 23–56% having learning disabilities. Muscle contractions in people with cerebral palsy-related high muscle tone are commonly thought to arise from overactivation. Although most people with CP have problems with increased muscle tone, some have low muscle tone instead. High muscle tone can either be due to spasticity or dystonia.

Cerebral palsy is characterized by abnormal muscle tone, reflexes, or motor development and coordination. The neurological lesion is primary and permanent while orthopedic manifestations are secondary to high muscle tone and progressive. In cerebral palsy with high muscle tone, unequal growth between muscle-tendon units and bone eventually leads to bone and joint deformities. At first, deformities are dynamic. Over time, deformities tend to become static, and joint contractures develop. Deformities in general and static deformities in specific (joint contractures) cause increasing gait difficulties in the form of tip-toeing gait, due to tightness of the Achilles tendon, and scissoring gait, due to tightness of the hip adductors. These gait patterns are among the most common gait abnormalities in children with cerebral palsy. However, orthopaedic manifestations of cerebral palsy are diverse. Additionally, crouch gait (also described as knee flexion gait) is prevalent among children who possess the ability to walk. The effects of cerebral palsy fall on a continuum of motor dysfunction, which may range from slight clumsiness at the mild end of the spectrum to impairments so severe that they render coordinated movement virtually impossible at the other end of the spectrum.

Babies born with severe cerebral palsy often have irregular posture; their bodies may be either very floppy or very stiff. Birth defects, such as spinal curvature, a small jawbone, or a small head sometimes occur along with CP. Symptoms may appear or change as a child ages. Babies born with cerebral palsy do not immediately present with symptoms. Classically, CP becomes evident when the baby reaches the developmental stage at 6 to 9 months and is starting to mobilise, where preferential use of limbs, asymmetry, or gross motor developmental delay is seen.

Drooling is common among children with cerebral palsy, which can have a variety of impacts including social rejection, impaired speaking, damage to clothing and books, and mouth infections. It can additionally cause choking.

An average of 55.5% of people with cerebral palsy experience lower urinary tract symptoms, more commonly excessive storage issues than voiding issues. Those with voiding issues and pelvic floor overactivity can deteriorate as adults and experience upper urinary tract dysfunction.

Children with CP may also have sensory processing issues. Adults with cerebral palsy have a higher risk of respiratory failure.

=== Skeleton ===
For bones to attain their normal shape and size, they require the stresses from normal musculature. People with cerebral palsy are at risk of low bone mineral density. The shafts of the bones are often thin (gracile), and become thinner during growth. When compared to these thin shafts (diaphyses), the centres (metaphyses) often appear quite enlarged (ballooning). Due to more than normal joint compression caused by muscular imbalances, articular cartilage may atrophy, leading to narrowed joint spaces. Depending on the degree of spasticity, a person with the spastic form of CP may exhibit a variety of angular joint deformities. Because vertebral bodies need vertical gravitational loading forces to develop properly, spasticity and an abnormal gait can hinder proper or full bone and skeletal development. People with CP tend to be shorter in height than the average person because their bones are not allowed to grow to their full potential. Sometimes bones grow to different lengths, so the person may have one leg longer than the other.

Children with CP are prone to low trauma fractures, particularly children with higher Gross Motor Function Classification System (GMFCS) levels who cannot walk. This further affects a child's mobility, strength, and experience of pain, and can lead to missed schooling or child abuse suspicions. These children generally have fractures in the legs, whereas non-affected children mostly fracture their arms in the context of sporting activities.

Hip dislocation and ankle equinus or plantar flexion deformity are the two most common deformities among children with cerebral palsy. Additionally, flexion deformity of the hip and knee can occur. Torsional deformities of long bones such as the femur and tibia are also encountered, among others. Children may develop scoliosis before the age of 10 – estimated prevalence of scoliosis in children with CP is between 21% and 64%. Higher levels of impairment on the GMFCS are associated with scoliosis and hip dislocation. Scoliosis can be corrected with surgery, but CP makes surgical complications more likely, even with improved techniques. Hip migration can be managed by soft tissue procedures such as adductor musculature release. Advanced degrees of hip migration or dislocation can be managed by more extensive procedures such as femoral and pelvic corrective osteotomies. Both soft tissue and bony procedures aim at prevention of hip dislocation in the early phases or aim at hip containment and restoration of anatomy in the late phases of disease. Equinus deformity is managed by conservative methods especially when dynamic. If fixed/static deformity ensues surgery may become mandatory.

Growth spurts during puberty can make walking more difficult for people with CP and high muscle tone.

=== Eating ===
Due to sensory and motor impairments, those with CP may have difficulty preparing food, holding utensils, or chewing and swallowing. An infant with CP may not be able to suck, swallow or chew. Gastro-oesophageal reflux is common in children with CP. Children with CP may have too little or too much sensitivity around and in the mouth. Poor balance when sitting, lack of control of the head, mouth, and trunk, not being able to bend the hips enough to allow the arms to stretch forward to reach and grasp food or utensils, and lack of hand-eye coordination can make self-feeding difficult. Feeding difficulties are related to higher GMFCS levels. Dental problems can also contribute to difficulties with eating. Pneumonia is also common where eating difficulties exist, caused by undetected aspiration of food or liquids. Fine finger dexterity, like that needed for picking up a utensil, is more frequently impaired than gross manual dexterity, like that needed for spooning food onto a plate. Grip strength impairments are less common.

Children with severe cerebral palsy, particularly with oropharyngeal issues, are at risk of undernutrition. Triceps skin fold tests have been found to be a very reliable indicator of malnutrition in children with cerebral palsy. Due to challenges in feeding, evidence has shown that children with cerebral palsy are at a greater risk of malnutrition.

=== Language ===
Speech and language disorders are common in people with cerebral palsy. The incidence of dysarthria is estimated to range from 31% to 88%, and around a quarter of people with CP are non-verbal. Speech problems are associated with poor respiratory control, laryngeal and velopharyngeal dysfunction, and oral articulation disorders that are due to restricted movement in the oral-facial muscles. There are three major types of dysarthria in cerebral palsy: spastic, dyskinetic (athetotic), and ataxic.

Early use of augmentative and alternative communication systems may assist the child in developing spoken language skills. Overall language delay is associated with problems of cognition, deafness, and learned helplessness. Children with cerebral palsy are at risk of learned helplessness and becoming passive communicators, initiating little communication. Early intervention with this clientele, and their parents, often targets situations in which children communicate with others so that they learn that they can control people and objects in their environment through this communication, including making choices, decisions, and mistakes.

=== Pain and sleep ===
Pain is common and may result from the inherent deficits associated with the condition, along with the numerous procedures children typically face. When children with cerebral palsy are in pain, they experience worse muscle spasms. Pain is associated with tight or shortened muscles, abnormal posture, stiff joints, unsuitable orthosis, etc. Hip migration or dislocation is a recognizable source of pain in CP children and especially in the adolescent population. Nevertheless, the adequate scoring and scaling of pain in CP children remains challenging. Pain in CP has a number of different causes, and different pains respond to different treatments.

There is also a high likelihood of chronic sleep disorders secondary to both physical and environmental factors. Children with cerebral palsy have significantly higher rates of sleep disturbance than typically developing children. Babies with cerebral palsy who have stiffness issues might cry more and be harder to put to sleep than non-disabled babies, or "floppy" babies might be lethargic. Chronic pain is under-recognized in children with cerebral palsy, even though three out of four children with cerebral palsy experience pain. Adults with CP also experience more pain than the general population.

=== Associated disorders ===
Associated disorders include intellectual disabilities, seizures, muscle contractures, abnormal gait, osteoporosis, communication disorders, malnutrition, sleep disorders, and mental health disorders, such as depression and anxiety. Epilepsy is often found in the child before they are 1 year old, or also before they are four or five. In addition to these, functional gastrointestinal abnormalities contributing to bowel obstruction, vomiting, and constipation may also arise. Adults with cerebral palsy may have ischemic heart disease, cerebrovascular disease, cancer, and trauma more often. Obesity in people with cerebral palsy or a more severe Gross Motor Function Classification System assessment in particular are considered risk factors for multimorbidity. The risk factors for cerebral palsy and the comorbidity rates (co-occurring complications) are much higher in low-resource or low- and middle-income countries compared to high-income countries. This is mostly due to differences in the quality of healthcare services for example in the obstetric and neonatal care, which are generally better in high-income countries. Other medical issues can be mistaken for being symptoms of cerebral palsy, and so may not be treated correctly.

Related conditions can include apraxia, sensory impairments, urinary incontinence, fecal incontinence, or behavioural disorders.

Seizure management is more difficult in people with CP as seizures often last longer. Epilepsy and asthma are common co-occurring diseases in adults with CP. The associated disorders that co-occur with cerebral palsy may be more disabling than the motor function problems.

Managing respiratory illnesses in children with severe CP is considered complex due to the need to manage oropharyngeal dysphagia of both food/drink and saliva, gastroesophageal reflux, motor disorders, upper airway obstruction during sleep, malnutrition, among other factors.

== Causes ==
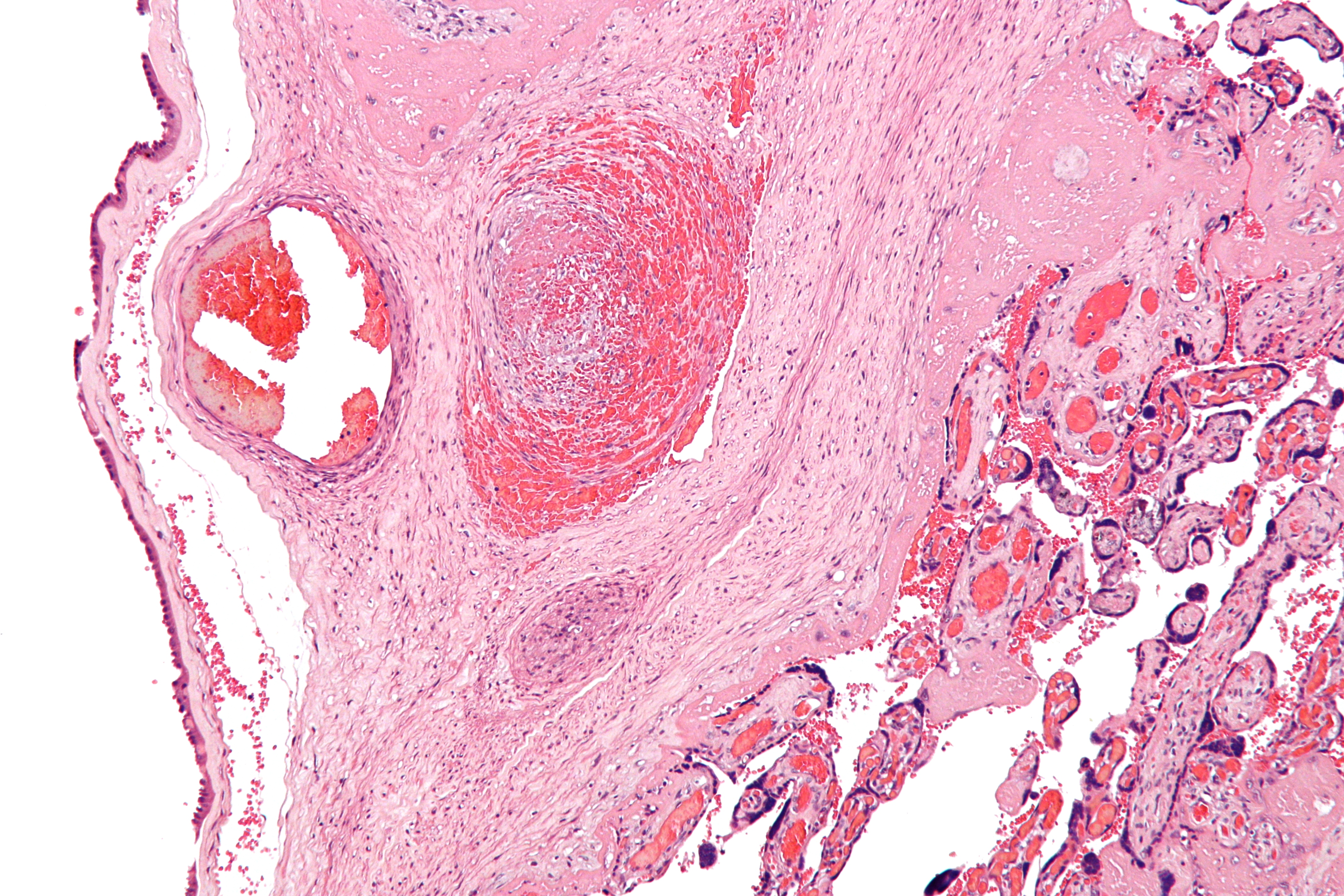
Micrograph showing a fetal (placental) vein thrombosis, in a case of fetal thrombotic vasculopathy. This is associated with cerebral palsy and is suggestive of a hypercoagulable state as the underlying cause.

Cerebral palsy is due to abnormal development or damage occurring to the developing brain. This damage can occur during pregnancy, delivery, the first month of life, or less commonly in early childhood. Structural problems in the brain are seen in 80% of cases, most commonly within the white matter. More than three-quarters of cases are believed to result from issues that occur during pregnancy. Most children who are born with cerebral palsy have more than one risk factor associated with CP. Cerebral palsy is not contagious and cannot be contracted in adulthood. CP is almost always developed in utero, or prior to birth.

While in certain cases there is no identifiable cause, typical causes include problems in intrauterine development (e.g. exposure to radiation, infection, fetal growth restriction), hypoxia of the brain (thrombotic events, placental insufficiency, umbilical cord prolapse), birth trauma during labor and delivery, and complications around birth or during childhood.

In Africa birth asphyxia, high bilirubin levels, and infections in newborns of the central nervous system are the main cause. Many cases of CP in Africa could be prevented with better resources available.

=== Preterm birth ===
Between 40% and 50% of all children who develop cerebral palsy were born prematurely. Most of these cases (75–90%) are believed to be due to issues that occur around the time of birth, often just after birth. Multiple-birth infants are also more likely than single-birth infants to have CP. They are also more likely to be born with a low birth weight.

In those who are born with a weight between 1 kg (2.2 lbs) and 1.5 kg (3.3 lbs) CP occurs in 6%. Among those born before 28 weeks of gestation it occurs in 8%. (Note: Incorrectly stated as 11% in 2013) Genetic factors are believed to play an important role in prematurity and cerebral palsy generally. In those who are born between 34 and 37 weeks the risk is 0.4% (three times normal).

=== Term infants ===
In babies who are born at term risk factors include problems with the placenta, birth defects, low birth weight, breathing meconium into the lungs, a delivery requiring either the use of instruments or an emergency Caesarean section, birth asphyxia, seizures just after birth, respiratory distress syndrome, low blood sugar, and infections in the baby.

As of 2013, it was unclear how much of a role birth asphyxia plays as a cause. It is unclear if the size of the placenta plays a role. As of 2015 it is evident that in advanced countries, most cases of cerebral palsy in term or near-term neonates have explanations other than asphyxia.

=== Genetics ===
Autosomal recessive inheritance pattern

Cerebral palsy is not commonly considered a genetic disease. About 2% of all CP cases are expected to be inherited, with glutamate decarboxylase-1 being one of the possible enzymes involved. Most inherited cases are autosomal recessive. However, the vast majority of CP cases are connected to brain damage during birth and in infancy. There is a small percentage of CP cases caused by brain damage that stemmed from the prenatal period, which is estimated to be less than 5% of CP cases overall. Moreover, there is no one reason why some CP cases come from prenatal brain damage, and it is not known if those cases have a genetic basis.

Cerebellar hypoplasia is sometimes genetic and can cause ataxic cerebral palsy.

=== Early childhood ===
After birth, other causes include toxins, severe jaundice, lead poisoning, physical brain injury, stroke, abusive head trauma, incidents involving hypoxia to the brain (such as near drowning), and encephalitis or meningitis.

=== Others ===
Infections in the mother, even those not easily detected, can triple the risk of the child developing cerebral palsy. Infection of the fetal membranes known as chorioamnionitis increases the risk.

Intrauterine and neonatal insults (many of which are infectious) increase the risk.

Rh blood type incompatibility can cause the mother's immune system to attack the baby's red blood cells.

It has been hypothesised that some cases of cerebral palsy are caused by the death in very early pregnancy of an identical twin.

== Diagnosis ==
The diagnosis of cerebral palsy has historically rested on the person's history and physical examination and is generally assessed at a young age. A general movements assessment, which involves measuring movements that occur spontaneously among those less than four months of age, appears most accurate. Children who are more severely affected are more likely to be noticed and diagnosed earlier. Abnormal muscle tone, delayed motor development and persistence of primitive reflexes are the main early symptoms of CP. Symptoms and diagnosis typically occur by the age of two, although depending on factors like malformations and congenital issues, persons with milder forms of cerebral palsy may be over the age of five, if not in adulthood, when finally diagnosed.

Cognitive assessments and medical observations are also useful to help confirm a diagnosis. Additionally, evaluations of the child's mobility, speech and language, hearing, vision, gait, feeding and digestion are also useful to determine the extent of the disorder. Early diagnosis and intervention are seen as being a key part of managing cerebral palsy. It is a developmental disability.

Once a person is diagnosed with cerebral palsy, further diagnostic tests are optional. Neuroimaging with CT or MRI is warranted when the cause of a person's cerebral palsy has not been established. An MRI is preferred over CT, due to diagnostic yield and safety. When abnormal, evidence from neuroimaging may suggest the timing of the initial damage. The CT or MRI is also capable of revealing treatable conditions, such as hydrocephalus, porencephaly, arteriovenous malformation, subdural hematomas and hygromas, and a vermian tumour (which a few studies suggest are present 5–22% of the time). Furthermore, abnormalities detected by neuroimaging may indicate a high likelihood of associated conditions, such as epilepsy and intellectual disability. There is a small risk associated with sedating children to facilitate a clear MRI.

The age when CP is diagnosed is important, but medical professionals disagree over the best age to make the diagnosis. The earlier CP is diagnosed correctly, the better the opportunities are to provide the child with physical and educational help, but there might be a greater chance of confusing CP with another problem, especially if the child is 18 months of age or younger. Infants may have temporary problems with muscle tone or control that can be confused with CP, which is permanent. A metabolism disorder or tumors in the nervous system may appear to be CP; metabolic disorders, in particular, can produce brain problems that look like CP on an MRI. Disorders that deteriorate the white matter in the brain and problems that cause spasms and weakness in the legs, may be mistaken for CP if they first appear early in life. However, these disorders worsen over time, and CP does not (although it may change in character). In infancy it may not be possible to tell the difference between them. In the UK, not being able to sit independently by the age of 8 months is regarded as a clinical sign for further monitoring. Fragile X syndrome (a cause of autism and intellectual disability) and general intellectual disability must also be ruled out. Cerebral palsy specialist John McLaughlin recommends waiting until the child is 36 months of age before making a diagnosis because, by that age, motor capacity is easier to assess.

=== Classification ===
CP is classified by the types of motor impairment of the limbs or organs, and by restrictions to the activities an affected person may perform. The Gross Motor Function Classification System-Expanded and Revised and the Manual Ability Classification System are used to describe mobility and manual dexterity in people with cerebral palsy, and recently the Communication Function Classification System, and the Eating and Drinking Ability Classification System have been proposed to describe those functions. There are three main CP classifications by motor impairment: spastic, ataxic, and dyskinetic. Additionally, there is a mixed type that shows a combination of features of the other types. These classifications reflect the areas of the brain that are damaged.

Cerebral palsy is also classified according to the topographic distribution of muscle spasticity. This method classifies children as diplegic, (bilateral involvement with leg involvement greater than arm involvement), hemiplegic (unilateral involvement), or quadriplegic (bilateral involvement with arm involvement equal to or greater than leg involvement).

==== Spastic ====
Spastic cerebral palsy is the type of cerebral palsy characterized by spasticity or high muscle tone often resulting in stiff, jerky movements. Itself an umbrella term encompassing spastic hemiplegia, spastic diplegia, spastic quadriplegia and – where solely one limb or one specific area of the body is affected – spastic monoplegia. Spastic cerebral palsy affects the motor cortex of the brain, a specific portion of the cerebral cortex responsible for the planning and completion of voluntary movement. Spastic CP is the most common type of overall cerebral palsy, representing about 80% of cases. Botulinum toxin is effective in decreasing spasticity. It can help increase range of motion which could help mitigate CP's effects on the growing bones of children. There may be an improvement in motor functions in the children and ability to walk. However, the main benefit derived from botulinum toxin A comes from its ability to reduce muscle tone and spasticity and thus prevent or delay the development of fixed muscle contractures.

==== Ataxic ====
Ataxic cerebral palsy is observed in approximately 5–10% of all cases of cerebral palsy, making it the least frequent form of cerebral palsy. Ataxic cerebral palsy is caused by damage to cerebellar structures. Because of the damage to the cerebellum, which is essential for coordinating muscle movements and balance, patients with ataxic cerebral palsy experience problems in coordination, specifically in their arms, legs, and trunk. Ataxic cerebral palsy is known to decrease muscle tone. The most common manifestation of ataxic cerebral palsy is intention (action) tremor, which is especially apparent when carrying out precise movements, such as tying shoe laces or writing with a pencil. This symptom progressively worsens as the movement persists, making the hand shake. As the hand get closer to accomplishing the intended task, the trembling intensifies, making it even more difficult to complete.

==== Dyskinetic ====
Dyskinetic cerebral palsy (sometimes abbreviated DCP) is primarily associated with damage to the basal ganglia and the substantia nigra in the form of lesions that occur during brain development due to bilirubin encephalopathy and hypoxic-ischemic brain injury. DCP is characterized by both hypertonia and hypotonia, due to the affected individual's inability to control muscle tone. Clinical diagnosis of DCP typically occurs within 18 months of birth and is primarily based upon motor function and neuroimaging techniques. Dyskinetic cerebral palsy is an extrapyramidal form of cerebral palsy. Dyskinetic cerebral palsy can be divided into two different groups; choreoathetosis and dystonia. Choreo-athetotic CP is characterized by involuntary movements, whereas dystonic CP is characterized by slow, strong contractions, which may occur locally or encompass the whole body.

==== Mixed ====
Mixed cerebral palsy has symptoms of dyskinetic, ataxic and spastic CP appearing simultaneously, each to varying degrees, and both with and without symptoms of each. Mixed CP is the most difficult to treat as it is extremely heterogeneous and sometimes unpredictable in its symptoms and development over the lifespan.

=== Gait classification ===
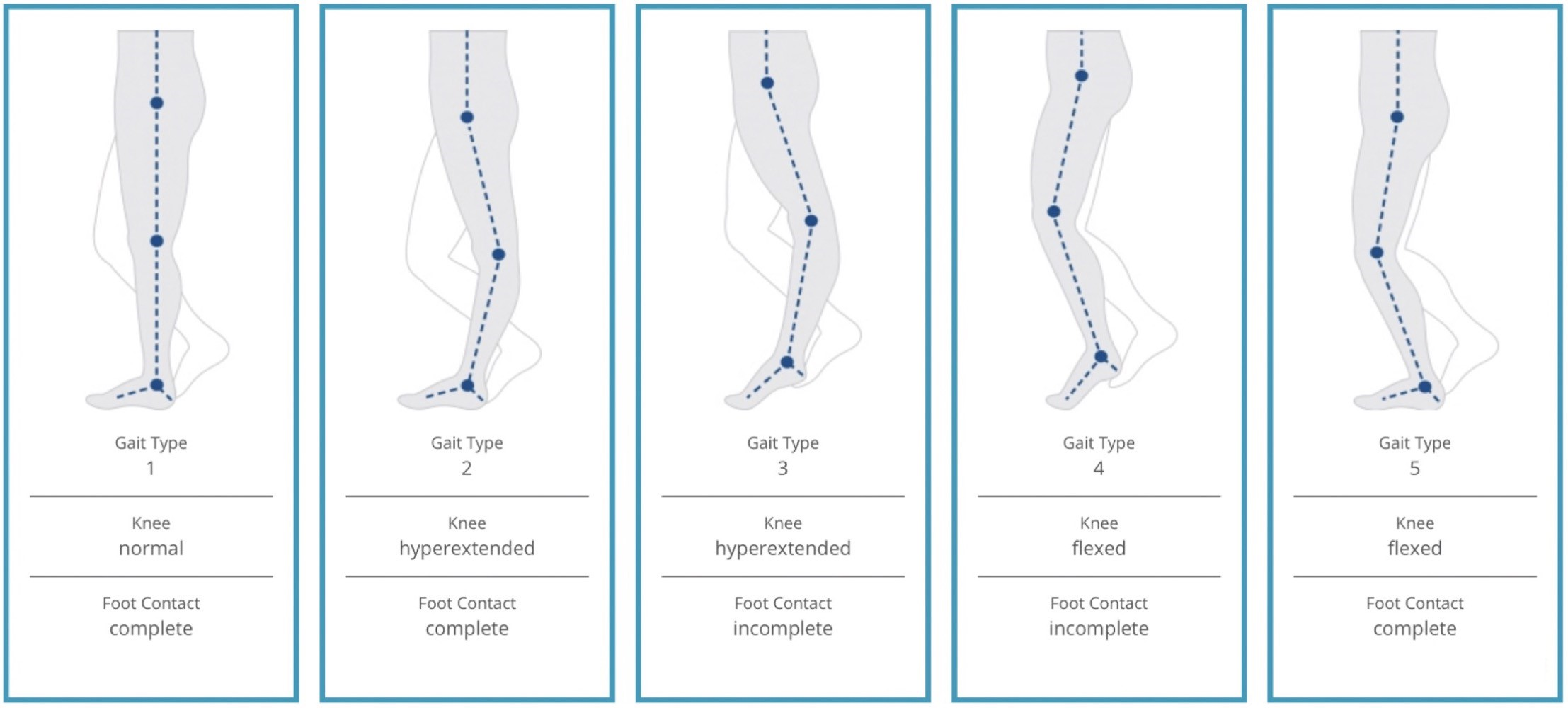
The Amsterdam Gait Classification facilitates the assessment of the gait pattern in CP patients. It helps to facilitate communication in the interdisciplinary team between those affected, doctors, physiotherapists and orthotists.

In patients with spastic hemiplegia or diplegia, various gait patterns can be observed, the exact form of which can only be described with the help of complex gait analysis systems. In order to facilitate interdisciplinary communication in the interdisciplinary team between those affected, doctors, physiotherapists and orthotists, a simple description of the gait pattern is useful. J. Rodda and H. K. Graham already described in 2001 how gait patterns of CP patients can be more easily recognized and defined gait types which they compared in a classification. They also described that gait patterns can vary with age. Building on this, the Amsterdam Gait Classification was developed at the free university in Amsterdam, the VU medisch centrum.

A special feature of this classification is that it makes different gait patterns very easy to recognize and can be used in CP patients in whom only one leg and both legs are affected. According to the Amsterdam Gait Classification, five gait types are described. To assess the gait pattern, the patient is viewed visually or via a video recording from the side of the leg to be assessed. At the point in time at which the leg to be viewed is in mid stance and the leg not to be viewed is in mid swing, the knee angle and the contact of the foot with the ground are assessed on the one hand.

Classification of the gait pattern according to the Amsterdam Gait Classification: In gait type 1, the knee angle is normal and the foot contact is complete. In gait type 2, the knee angle is hyperextended and the foot contact is complete. In gait type 3, the knee angle is hyperextended and foot contact is incomplete (only on the forefoot). In gait type 4, the knee angle is bent and foot contact is incomplete (only on the forefoot). With gait type 5, the knee angle is bent and the foot contact is complete.

Gait types 5 is also known as crouch gait.

== Prevention ==
Because the causes of CP are varied, a broad range of preventive interventions have been investigated.

Electronic fetal monitoring has not helped to prevent CP, and in 2014 the American College of Obstetricians and Gynecologists, the Royal Australian and New Zealand College of Obstetricians and Gynaecologists, and the Society of Obstetricians and Gynaecologists of Canada have acknowledged that there are no long-term benefits of electronic fetal monitoring. Before this, electronic fetal monitoring was widely used to prop up obstetric litigation.

In those at risk of an early delivery, magnesium sulphate appears to decrease the risk of cerebral palsy. It is unclear if it helps those who are born at term. In those at high risk of preterm labor a review found that moderate to severe CP was reduced by the administration of magnesium sulphate, and that adverse effects on the babies from the magnesium sulphate were not significant. Mothers who received magnesium sulphate could experience side effects such as respiratory depression and nausea. However, guidelines for the use of magnesium sulfate in mothers at risk of preterm labour are not strongly adhered to; in 2017 only 2 in 3 eligible women in the UK received the medication despite it being recommended by NICE guidelines. An NHS quality improvement programme increased its usage in England from 71% in 2018 to 83% in 2020.

Caffeine is used to treat apnea of prematurity and reduces the risk of cerebral palsy in premature babies, but there are also concerns of long term negative effects. A moderate quality level of evidence indicates that giving women antibiotics during preterm labor before her membranes have ruptured (water is not yet not broken) may increase the risk of cerebral palsy for the child. Additionally, for preterm babies for whom there is a chance of fetal compromise, allowing the birth to proceed rather than trying to delay the birth may lead to an increased risk of cerebral palsy in the child. Corticosteroids are sometimes taken by pregnant women expecting a preterm birth to provide neuroprotection to their baby. Taking corticosteroids during pregnancy is shown to have no significant correlation with developing cerebral palsy in preterm births.

Cooling high-risk full-term babies shortly after birth may reduce disability, but this may only be useful for some forms of the brain damage that causes CP.

== Management ==
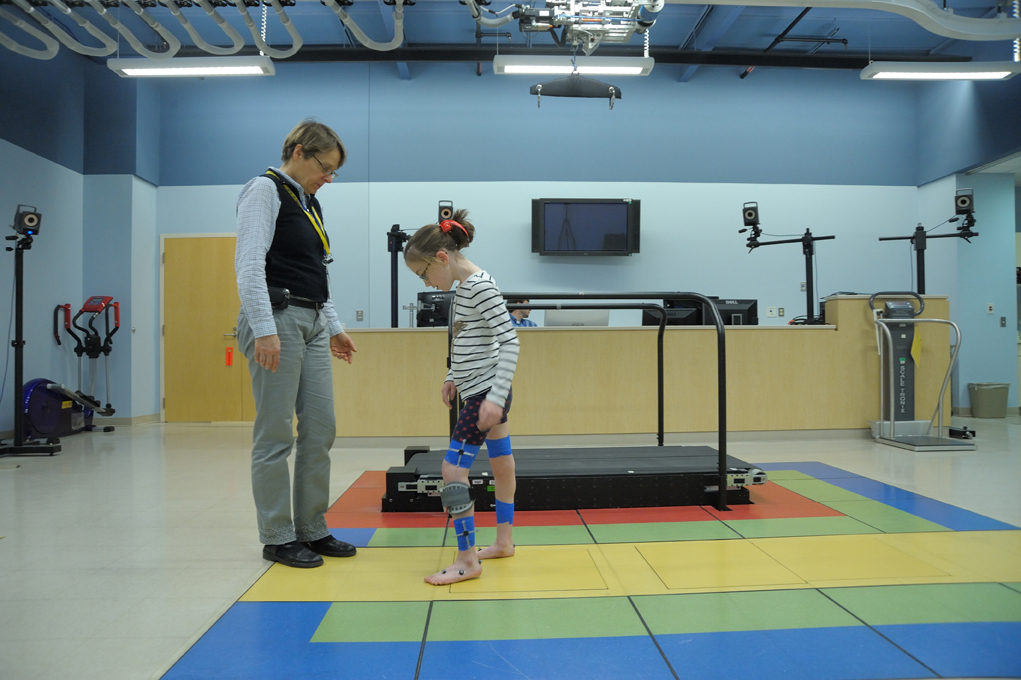
Researchers are developing an electrical stimulation device specifically for children with cerebral palsy, who have foot drop, which causes tripping when walking.

Over time, the approach to CP management has shifted away from narrow attempts to fix individual physical problems – such as spasticity in a particular limb – to making such treatments part of a larger goal of maximizing the person's independence and community engagement. However, the evidence base for the effectiveness of intervention programs reflecting the philosophy of independence has not yet caught up: effective interventions for body structures and functions have a strong evidence base, but evidence is lacking for effective interventions targeted toward participation, environment, or personal factors. There is also no good evidence to show that an intervention that is effective at the body-specific level will result in an improvement at the activity level or vice versa. Although such cross-over benefit might happen, not enough high-quality studies have been done to demonstrate it.

Because cerebral palsy has "varying severity and complexity" across the lifespan, it can be considered a collection of conditions for management purposes. A multidisciplinary approach for cerebral palsy management is recommended, focusing on "maximising individual function, choice and independence" in line with the International Classification of Functioning, Disability and Health's goals. The team may include a paediatrician, a health visitor, a social worker, a physiotherapist, an orthotist, a speech and language therapist, an occupational therapist, a teacher specialising in helping children with visual impairment, an educational psychologist, an orthopaedic surgeon, a neurologist and a neurosurgeon.

Various forms of therapy are available to people living with cerebral palsy as well as caregivers and parents. Treatment may include one or more of the following: physical therapy; occupational therapy; speech therapy; water therapy; drugs to control seizures, alleviate pain, or relax muscle spasms (e.g. benzodiazepines); surgery to correct anatomical abnormalities or release tight muscles; braces and other orthotic devices; rolling walkers; and communication aids such as computers with attached voice synthesisers. Intensive rehabilitation is practiced in certain countries, but obtaining reliable data on its medium and long-term effectiveness is challenging.

Surgical intervention in CP children may include various orthopaedic or neurological surgeries to improve quality of life, such as tendon releases, hip rotation, spinal fusion, (selective dorsal rhizotomy) or placement of an intrathecal baclofen pump.

A Cochrane review published in 2004 found a trend toward the benefit of speech and language therapy for children with cerebral palsy but noted the need for high-quality research. A 2013 systematic review found that many of the therapies used to treat CP have no good evidence base; the treatments with the best evidence are medications (anticonvulsants, botulinum toxin, bisphosphonates, diazepam), therapy (bimanual training, casting, constraint-induced movement therapy, context-focused therapy, fitness training, goal-directed training, hip surveillance, home programmes, occupational therapy after botulinum toxin, pressure care) and surgery. There is also research on whether the sleeping position might improve hip migration, but there are not yet high-quality evidence studies to support that theory. Research papers also call for an agreed consensus on outcome measures which will allow researchers to cross-reference research. Also, the terminology used to describe orthoses needs to be standardised to ensure studies can be reproduced and readily compared and evaluated.

== Orthotics in the concept of therapy ==
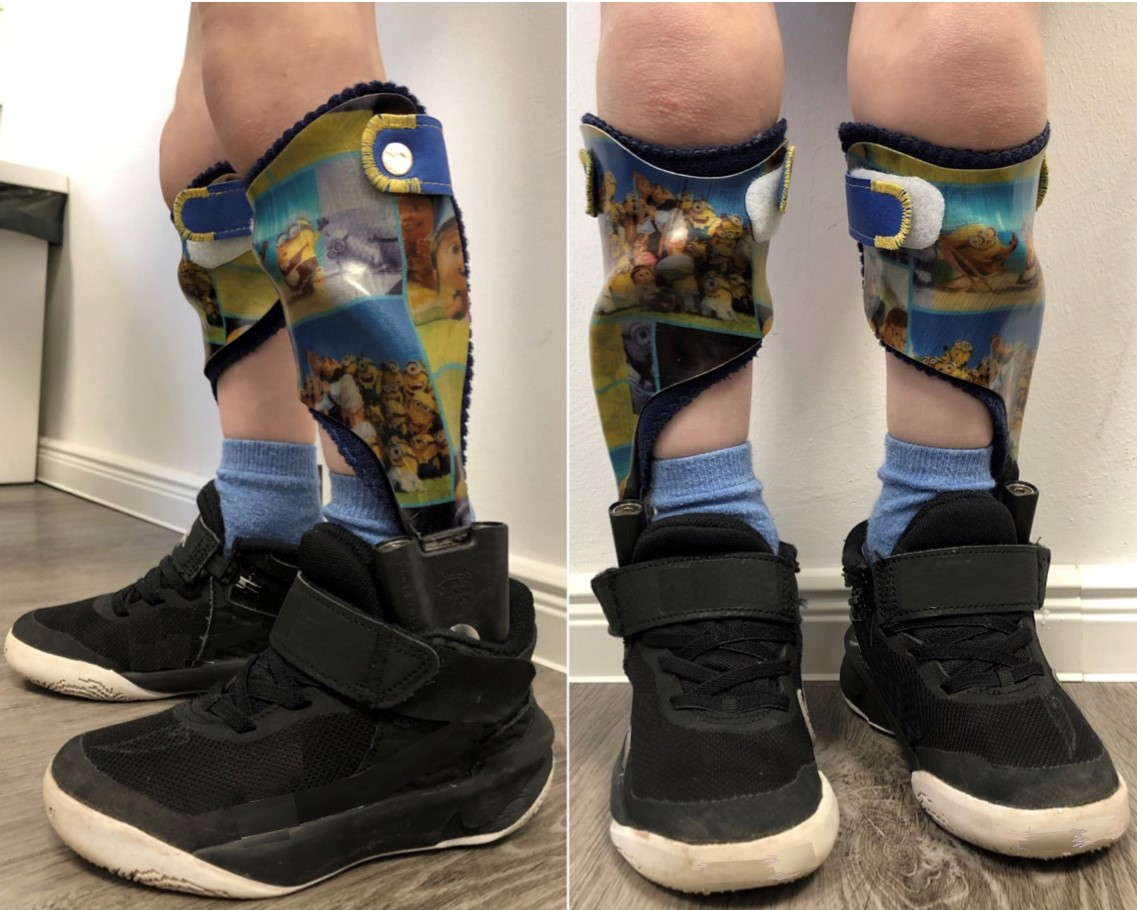
Child with cerebral palsy and orthotics with adjustable functional elements to improve safety when standing and walking

To improve the gait pattern, orthotics can be included in the therapy concept. An orthosis can support physiotherapeutic treatment in setting the right motor impulses in order to create new cerebral connections. The orthosis must meet the requirements of the medical prescription. In addition, the orthosis must be designed by the orthotist in such a way that it achieves the effectiveness of the necessary levers, matching the gait pattern, in order to support the proprioceptive approaches of physiotherapy. The characteristics of the stiffness of the orthosis shells and the adjustable dynamics in the ankle joint are important elements of the orthosis to be considered.

Due to these requirements, the development of orthoses has changed significantly in recent years, especially since around 2010. At about the same time, care concepts were developed that deal intensively with the orthotic treatment of the lower extremities in cerebral palsy. Modern materials and new functional elements enable the rigidity to be specifically adapted to the requirements that fits to the gait pattern of the CP patient. The adjustment of the stiffness has a decisive influence on the gait pattern and on the energy cost of walking. It is of great advantage if the stiffness of the orthosis can be adjusted separately from one another via resistances of the two functional elements in the two directions of movement, dorsiflexion and plantar flexion.

== Prognosis ==
CP is not a progressive disorder (meaning the brain damage does not worsen), but the symptoms can become more severe over time. A person with the disorder may improve somewhat during childhood if the person receives extensive care, but once bones and musculature become more established, orthopedic surgery may be required. People with CP can have varying degrees of cognitive impairment or none whatsoever. The full intellectual potential of a child born with CP is often not known until the child starts school. People with CP are more likely to have learning disorders but have normal intelligence. Intellectual level among people with CP varies from genius to intellectually disabled, as it does in the general population, and experts have stated that it is important not to underestimate the capabilities of a person with CP and to give them every opportunity to learn.

The ability to live independently with CP varies widely, depending partly on the severity of each person's impairment and partly on the capability of each person to self-manage the logistics of life. Some individuals with CP require personal assistant services for all activities of daily living. Others only need assistance with certain activities, and still others do not require any physical assistance. But regardless of the severity of a person's physical impairment, a person's ability to live independently often depends primarily on the person's capacity to manage the physical realities of his or her life autonomously. In some cases, people with CP recruit, hire, and manage a staff of personal care assistants (PCAs). PCAs facilitate the independence of their employers by assisting them with their daily personal needs in a way that allows them to maintain control over their lives.

Puberty in young adults with cerebral palsy may be precocious or delayed. Delayed puberty is thought to be a consequence of nutritional deficiencies. There is currently no evidence that CP affects fertility, although some of the secondary symptoms have been shown to affect sexual desire and performance. Adults with CP were less likely to get routine reproductive health screening as of 2005. Gynecological examinations may have to be performed under anesthesia due to spasticity, and equipment is often not accessible. Breast self-examination may be difficult, so partners or carers may have to perform it. Men with CP have higher levels of cryptorchidism at the age of 21.

CP can significantly reduce a person's life expectancy, depending on the severity of their condition and the quality of care they receive. 5–10% of children with CP die in childhood, particularly where seizures and intellectual disability also affect the child. The ability to ambulate, roll, and self-feed has been associated with increased life expectancy. While there is a lot of variation in how CP affects people, it has been found that "independent gross motor functional ability is a very strong determinant of life expectancy". According to the Australian Bureau of Statistics, in 2014, 104 Australians died of cerebral palsy. The most common causes of death in CP are related to respiratory causes, but in middle age cardiovascular issues and neoplastic disorders become more prominent.

=== Self-care ===
For many children with CP, parents are heavily involved in self-care activities. Self-care activities, such as bathing, dressing, and grooming, can be difficult for children with CP, as self-care depends primarily on the use of the upper limbs. For those living with CP, impaired upper limb function affects almost 50% of children and is considered the main factor contributing to decreased activity and participation. As the hands are used for many self-care tasks, sensory and motor impairments of the hands make daily self-care more difficult. Motor impairments cause more problems than sensory impairments. The most common impairment is that of finger dexterity, which is the ability to manipulate small objects with the fingers. Compared to other disabilities, people with cerebral palsy generally need more help in performing daily tasks. Occupational therapists are healthcare professionals that help individuals with disabilities gain or regain their independence through the use of meaningful activities.

=== Productivity ===
The effects of sensory, motor, and cognitive impairments affect self-care occupations in children with CP and productivity occupations. Productivity can include but is not limited to, school, work, household chores, or contributing to the community.

Play is included as a productive occupation as it is often the primary activity for children. If play becomes difficult due to a disability, like CP, this can cause problems for the child. These difficulties can affect a child's self-esteem. In addition, the sensory and motor problems experienced by children with CP affect how the child interacts with their surroundings, including the environment and other people. Not only do physical limitations affect a child's ability to play, the limitations perceived by the child's caregivers and playmates also affect the child's play activities. Some children with disabilities spend more time playing by themselves. When a disability prevents a child from playing, there may be social, emotional and psychological problems, which can lead to increased dependence on others, less motivation, and poor social skills.

In school, students are asked to complete many tasks and activities, many of which involve handwriting. Many children with CP have the capacity to learn and write in the school environment. However, students with CP may find it difficult to keep up with the handwriting demands of school and their writing may be difficult to read. In addition, writing may take longer and require greater effort on the student's part. Factors linked to handwriting include postural stability, sensory and perceptual abilities of the hand, and writing tool pressure.

Speech impairments may be seen in children with CP depending on the severity of brain damage. Communication in a school setting is important because communicating with peers and teachers is very much a part of the "school experience" and enhances social interaction. Problems with language or motor dysfunction can lead to underestimating a student's intelligence. In summary, children with CP may experience difficulties in school, such as difficulty with handwriting, carrying out school activities, communicating verbally, and interacting socially.

=== Leisure ===
Leisure activities can have several positive effects on physical health, mental health, life satisfaction, and psychological growth for people with physical disabilities like CP. Common benefits identified are stress reduction, development of coping skills, companionship, enjoyment, relaxation and a positive effect on life satisfaction. In addition, for children with CP, leisure appears to enhance adjustment to living with a disability.

Leisure can be divided into structured (formal) and unstructured (informal) activities. Children and teens with CP engage in less habitual physical activity than their peers. Children with CP primarily engage in physical activity through therapies aimed at managing their CP, or through organized sport for people with disabilities. It is difficult to sustain behavioural change in terms of increasing physical activity of children with CP. Gender, manual dexterity, the child's preferences, cognitive impairment and epilepsy were found to affect children's leisure activities, with manual dexterity associated with more leisure activity. Although leisure is important for children with CP, they may have difficulties carrying out leisure activities due to social and physical barriers.

Children with cerebral palsy may face challenges when it comes to participating in sports. This comes with being discouraged from physical activity because of these perceived limitations imposed by their medical condition.

=== Participation and barriers ===
Participation is involvement in life situations and everyday activities. Participation includes self-care, productivity, and leisure. In fact, communication, mobility, education, home life, leisure, and social relationships require participation, and indicate the extent to which children function in their environment. Barriers can exist on three levels: micro, meso, and macro. First, the barriers at the micro level involve the person. Barriers at the micro level include the child's physical limitations (motor, sensory and cognitive impairments) or their subjective feelings regarding their ability to participate. For example, the child may not participate in group activities due to lack of confidence. Second, barriers at the meso level include the family and community. These may include negative attitudes of people toward disability or lack of support within the family or in the community.

One of the main reasons for this limited support appears to be the result of a lack of awareness and knowledge regarding the child's ability to engage in activities despite his or her disability. Third, barriers at the macro level incorporate the systems and policies that are not in place or hinder children with CP. These may be environmental barriers to participation such as architectural barriers, lack of relevant assistive technology, and transportation difficulties due to limited wheelchair access or public transit that can accommodate children with CP.

A 2013 review stated that outcomes for adults with cerebral palsy without intellectual disability in the 2000s were that "60–80% completed high school, 14–25% completed college, up to 61% were living independently in the community, 25–55% were competitively employed, and 14–28% were involved in long term relationships with partners or had established families". Adults with cerebral palsy may not seek physical therapy due to transport issues, financial restrictions and practitioners not feeling like they know enough about cerebral palsy to take people with CP on as clients.

=== Aging ===
Children with CP may not successfully transition into using adult services because they are not referred to one upon turning 18, and may decrease their use of services. Quality of life outcomes tend to decline for adults with cerebral palsy. Because children with cerebral palsy are often told that it is a non-progressive disease, they may be unprepared for the greater effects of the aging process as they head into their 30s. Young adults with cerebral palsy experience problems with aging that non-disabled adults experience "much later in life". 25% or more adults with cerebral palsy who can walk experience increasing difficulties walking with age. Hand function does not seem to have similar declines. Chronic disease risk, such as obesity, is also higher among adults with cerebral palsy than the general population. Common problems include increased pain, reduced flexibility, increased spasms and contractures, post-impairment syndrome and increasing problems with balance. Increased fatigue is also a problem. When adulthood and cerebral palsy is discussed, as of 2011, it is not discussed in terms of the different stages of adulthood. About half of people with CP report some loss of function as of their 40s.

Like they did in childhood, adults with cerebral palsy experience psychosocial issues related to their CP, chiefly the need for social support, self-acceptance, and acceptance by others. Workplace accommodations may be needed to enhance continued employment for adults with CP as they age. Rehabilitation or social programs that include salutogenesis may improve the coping potential of adults with CP as they age.

== Epidemiology ==
Cerebral palsy occurs in about 2.1 per 1000 live births. In those born at term rates are lower at 1 per 1000 live births. Within a population it may occur more often in poorer people. The rate is higher in males than in females; in Europe it is 1.3 times more common in males.

There was a "moderate, but significant" rise in the prevalence of CP between the 1970s and 1990s. This is thought to be due to a rise in low birth weight of infants and the increased survival rate of these infants. The increased survival rate of infants with CP in the 1970s and 1980s may be indirectly due to the disability rights movement challenging perspectives around the worth of infants with a disability, as well as the Baby Doe Law. Between 1990 and 2003, rates of cerebral palsy remained the same.

As of 2005, advances in the care of pregnant mothers and their babies did not result in a noticeable decrease in CP. This is generally attributed to medical advances in areas related to the care of premature babies (which results in a greater survival rate). Only the introduction of quality medical care to locations with less-than-adequate medical care has shown any decreases. The incidence of CP increases with premature or very low-weight babies regardless of the quality of care. As of 2016, there is a suggestion that both incidence and severity are slightly decreasing – more research is needed to find out if this is significant, and if so, which interventions are effective. It has been found that high-income countries have lower rates of children born with cerebral palsy than low or middle-income countries.

Prevalence of cerebral palsy is best calculated around the school entry age of about six years; the prevalence in the U.S. is estimated to be 2.4 out of 1000 children.

== History ==
Cerebral palsy has affected humans since antiquity. A decorated grave marker dating from around the 15th to 14th century BCE shows a figure with one small leg and using a crutch, possibly due to cerebral palsy. The oldest likely physical evidence of the condition comes from the mummy of Siptah, an Egyptian Pharaoh who ruled from about 1196 to 1190 BCE and died at about 20 years of age. The presence of cerebral palsy has been suspected due to his deformed foot and hands.

The medical literature of the ancient Greeks discusses paralysis and weakness of the arms and legs; the modern word palsy comes from the Ancient Greek words παράλυσις or πάρεσις, meaning paralysis or paresis respectively. In ancient Greece, Hippocrates (c. 460–c. 390 B.C.), often referred to as the Father of Medicine, made early observations regarding the relationship between pregnancy complications and neonatal outcomes. In his treatise On the Eight-Month Foetus, he discussed associations between prematurity, maternal illness, and prenatal stress in the development of congenital conditions. He noted that infants born to mothers who experienced fever, unexplained weight loss, or other health issues during pregnancy were more likely to have physical or neurological impairments. Hippocrates also described increased morbidity and mortality in children he referred to as having "intrauterine disease", suggesting an early understanding of fetal distress and its consequences The works of the school of Hippocrates (460–c. 370 BCE), and the manuscript On the Sacred Disease in particular, describe a group of problems that matches up very well with the modern understanding of cerebral palsy. The Roman Emperor Claudius (10 BCE–54 CE) is suspected of having CP, as historical records describe him as having several physical problems in line with the condition. Medical historians have begun to suspect and find depictions of CP in much later art. Several paintings from the 16th century and later show individuals with problems consistent with it, such as Jusepe de Ribera's 1642 painting The Clubfoot.

The modern understanding of CP as resulting from problems within the brain began in the early decades of the 1800s with a number of publications on brain abnormalities by Johann Christian Reil, Claude François Lallemand and Philippe Pinel. Later physicians used this research to connect problems in the brain with specific symptoms. The English surgeon William John Little (1810–1894) was the first person to study CP extensively. In his doctoral thesis he stated that CP was a result of a problem around the time of birth. He later identified a difficult delivery, a preterm birth and perinatal asphyxia in particular as risk factors. The spastic diplegia form of CP came to be known as Little's disease. At around this time, a German surgeon was also working on cerebral palsy, and distinguished it from polio. In the 1880s British neurologist William Gowers built on Little's work by linking paralysis in newborns to difficult births. He named the problem "birth palsy" and classified birth palsies into two types: peripheral and cerebral.

Working in the US in the 1880s, Canadian-born physician William Osler (1849–1919) reviewed dozens of CP cases to further classify the disorders by the site of the problems on the body and by the underlying cause. Osler made further observations tying problems around the time of delivery with CP, and concluded that problems causing bleeding inside the brain were likely the root cause. Osler also suspected polioencephalitis as an infectious cause. Through the 1890s, scientists commonly confused CP with polio.

Before moving to psychiatry, Austrian neurologist Sigmund Freud (1856–1939) made further refinements to the classification of the disorder. He produced the system still being used today. Freud's system divides the causes of the disorder into problems present at birth, problems that develop during birth, and problems after birth. Freud also made a rough correlation between the location of the problem inside the brain and the location of the affected limbs on the body and documented the many kinds of movement disorders.

In the early 20th century, the attention of the medical community generally turned away from CP until orthopedic surgeon Winthrop Phelps became the first physician to treat the disorder. He viewed CP from a musculoskeletal perspective instead of a neurological one. Phelps developed surgical techniques for operating on the muscles to address issues such as spasticity and muscle rigidity. Hungarian physical rehabilitation practitioner András Pető developed a system to teach children with CP how to walk and perform other basic movements. Pető's system became the foundation for conductive education, widely used for children with CP today. Through the remaining decades, physical therapy for CP has evolved, and has become a core component of the CP management program.

In 1997, Robert Palisano et al. introduced the Gross Motor Function Classification System (GMFCS) as an improvement over the previous rough assessment of limitation as either mild, moderate, or severe. The GMFCS grades limitation based on observed proficiency in specific basic mobility skills such as sitting, standing, and walking, and takes into account the level of dependency on aids such as wheelchairs or walkers. The GMFCS was further revised and expanded in 2007.

== Society and culture ==
=== Economic impact ===
It is difficult to directly compare the cost and cost-effectiveness of interventions to prevent cerebral palsy or the cost of interventions to manage CP. Access Economics has released a report on the economic impact of cerebral palsy in Australia. The report found that, in 2007, the financial cost of cerebral palsy (CP) in Australia was A$1.47 billion or 0.14% of GDP. Of this:

- A$1.03 billion (69.9%) was productivity lost due to lower employment, absenteeism, and premature death of Australians with CP
- A$141 million (9.6%) was the DWL from transfers including welfare payments and taxation forgone
- A$131 million (9.0%) was other indirect costs such as direct program services, aides and home modifications, and the bringing-forward of funeral costs
- A$129 million (8.8%) was the value of the informal care for people with CP
- A$40 million (2.8%) was direct health system expenditure

The value of lost well-being (disability and premature death) was a further A$2.4 billion.

In per capita terms, this amounts to a financial cost of A$43,431 per person with CP per annum. Including the value of lost well-being, the cost is over A$115,000 per person per annum.

Individuals with CP bear 37% of the financial costs, and their families and friends bear a further 6%. The federal government bears around one-third (33%) of the financial costs (mainly through taxation revenues forgone and welfare payments). State governments bear under 1% of the costs, while employers bear 5% and the rest of society bears the remaining 19%. If the burden of disease (lost well-being) is included, individuals bear 76% of the costs.

The average lifetime cost for people with CP in the US is US$921,000 per individual, including lost income.

In the United States, many states allow Medicaid beneficiaries to use their Medicaid funds to hire their own PCAs, instead of forcing them to use institutional or managed care.

In India, the government-sponsored program called "NIRAMAYA" for the medical care of children with neurological and muscular deformities has proved to be an ameliorating economic measure for persons with such disabilities. It has shown that persons with mental or physically debilitating congenital disabilities can lead better lives if they have financial independence.

=== Use of the term ===
"Cerebral" means "of, or pertaining to, the cerebrum or the brain" and "palsy" means "paralysis, generally partial, whereby a local body area is incapable of voluntary movement". It has been proposed to change the name to "cerebral palsy spectrum disorder" to reflect the diversity of presentations of CP.

Many people would rather be referred to as a person with a disability (people-first language) instead of as "handicapped". "Cerebral Palsy: A Guide for Care" at the University of Delaware offers the following guidelines:

Impairment is the correct term to use to define a deviation from normal, such as not being able to make a muscle move or not being able to control an unwanted movement. Disability is the term used to define a restriction in the ability to perform a normal activity of daily living which someone of the same age can perform. For example, a three-year-old child who is not able to walk has a disability because a normal three-year-old can walk independently. A handicapped child or adult is one who, because of the disability, is unable to achieve the normal role in society commensurate with his age and socio-cultural milieu. As an example, a sixteen-year-old who is unable to prepare his own meal or care for his own toilet or hygiene needs is handicapped. On the other hand, a sixteen-year-old who can walk only with the assistance of crutches but who attends a regular school and is fully independent in activities of daily living is disabled but not handicapped. All disabled people are impaired, and all handicapped people are disabled, but a person can be impaired and not necessarily be disabled, and a person can be disabled without being handicapped.

The term "spastic" denotes the attribute of spasticity in types of spastic CP. In 1952 a UK charity called The Spastics Society was formed. The term "spastics" was used by the charity as a term for people with CP. The word "spastic" has since been used extensively as a general insult to disabled people, which some see as extremely offensive. They are also frequently used to insult non-disabled people when they seem overly uncoordinated, anxious, or unskilled in sports. The charity changed its name to Scope in 1994. In the United States the word spaz has the same usage as an insult but is not generally associated with CP.

=== Media ===
Maverick documentary filmmaker Kazuo Hara criticises the mores and customs of Japanese society in an unsentimental portrait of adults with cerebral palsy in his 1972 film Goodbye CP. Focusing on how people with cerebral palsy are generally ignored or disregarded in Japan, Hara challenges his society's taboos about physical handicaps. Using a deliberately harsh style, with grainy black-and-white photography and out-of-sync sound, Hara brings a stark realism to his subject.

Spandan (2012), a film by Vegitha Reddy and Aman Tripathi, delves into the dilemma of parents whose child has cerebral palsy. While films made with children with special needs as central characters have been attempted before, the predicament of parents dealing with the stigma associated with the condition and beyond is dealt in Spandan. In one of the songs of Spandan "Chal chaal chaal tu bala" more than 50 CP kids have acted. The famous classical singer Devaki Pandit has given her voice to the song penned by Prof. Jayant Dhupkar and composed by National Film Awards winner Isaac Thomas Kottukapally.

My Left Foot (1989) is a drama film directed by Jim Sheridan and starring Daniel Day-Lewis. It tells the true story of Christy Brown, an Irishman born with cerebral palsy, who could control only his left foot. Christy Brown grew up in a poor, working-class family, and became a writer and artist. It won the Academy Award for Best Actor (Daniel Day-Lewis) and Best Actress in a Supporting Role (Brenda Fricker). It was also nominated for Best Director, Best Picture and Best Writing, Screenplay Based on Material from Another Medium. It also won the New York Film Critics Circle Award for Best Film for 1989.

Call the Midwife (2012–) has featured two episodes with actor Colin Young, who himself has cerebral palsy, playing a character with the same disability. His storylines have focused on the segregation of those with disabilities in the UK in the 1950s, and also romantic relationships between people with disabilities. Rosie Jones also featured in a 13-1 episode having a child and finding a significant other, Also dealing with resistance from her own mother.

Micah Fowler, an American actor with CP, stars in the ABC sitcom Speechless (2016–2019), which explores both the serious and humorous challenges a family faces with a teenager with CP.

9-1-1 (2018–) is a procedural drama series on Fox. From season 2 onwards, it features Gavin McHugh (who himself has cerebral palsy) in the recurring role as Christopher Diaz – a semi recurring character who has cerebral palsy.

Special (2019) is a comedy series that premiered on Netflix on 12 April 2019. It was written, produced and stars Ryan O'Connell as a young gay man with mild cerebral palsy. It is based on O'Connell's book I'm Special: And Other Lies We Tell Ourselves.

Australian drama serial The Heights (2019–) features a character with mild cerebral palsy, teenage girl Sabine Rosso, depicted by an actor who herself has mild cerebral palsy, Bridie McKim.

6,000 Waiting (2021) is a documentary by Michael Joseph McDonald. It is the first film to depict a person with cerebral palsy parachuting. It tells the story of three men with cerebral palsy seeking to live in their communities instead of institutions. Upon seeing the film, American politician Stacey Abrams interviewed one of the film's protagonists and publicly stated that her top priority was deinstitutionalization through Medicaid expansion.

=== Notable people ===
- Christy Brown was the basis for the Academy Award-winning film, My Left Foot.
- Two sons of Canadian rock musician Neil Young, Zeke and Ben. In 1986, Young helped found the Bridge School, an educational organization for children with severe verbal and physical disabilities, and its annual supporting Bridge School Benefit concerts, together with his wife Pegi.
- Nicolas Hamilton, a British racing driver competing in BTCC. He is the half-brother of Formula 1 driver Lewis Hamilton.

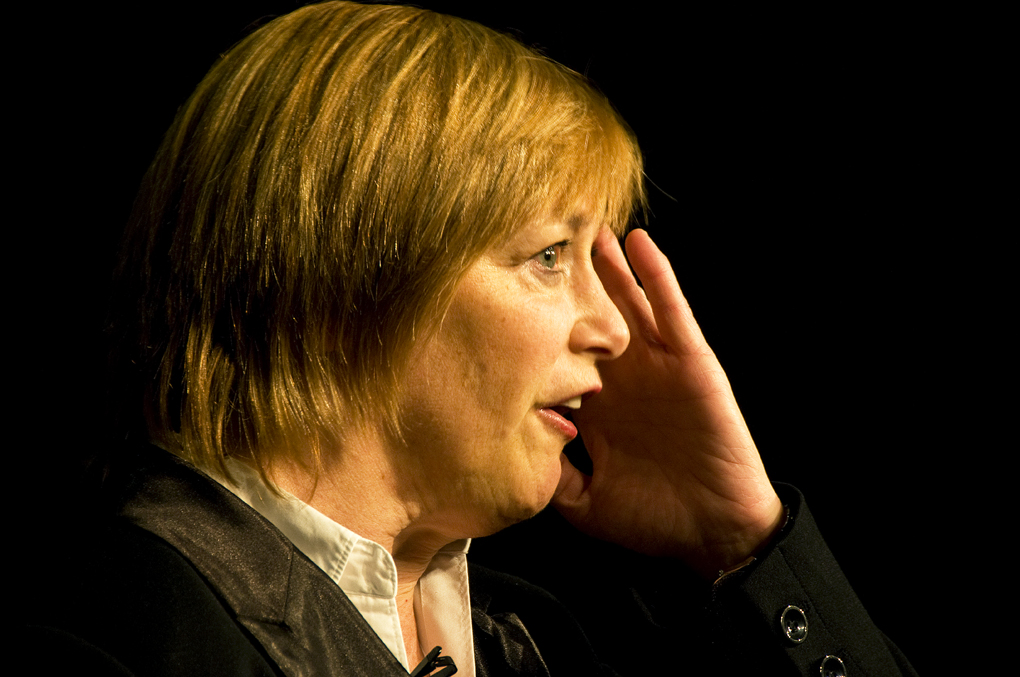
Geri Jewell in 2009

- Geri Jewell, who had a regular role in the prime-time series The Facts of Life.
- Imani Barbarin, American disability justice advocate, blogger, and internet personality (Crutches and Spice)
- Josh Blue, winner of the fourth season of NBC's Last Comic Standing, whose act revolves around his CP. Blue was also on the 2004 U.S. Paralympic soccer team.
- Jason Benetti, play-by-play broadcaster for ESPN, Fox Sports, Westwood One, and Time Warner covering football, baseball, lacrosse, hockey, and basketball. From 2016 until 2023, he was the television play-by-play announcer for Chicago White Sox home games. Since 2024, Benetti has been the play-by-play announcer for the Detroit Tigers.
- Jack Carroll, British comedian and runner-up in the seventh season of Britain's Got Talent, and winner of a BAFTA Award for his BBC Comedy, Mobility.
- Jamie Beddard, Producer and Stage Actor, known for Extraordinary Bodies.
- Abbey Curran, an American beauty queen who represented Iowa at Miss USA 2008 and was the first contestant with a disability to compete.
- Laurence Clarke, British comedian, writer and activist.
- Robert Griswold, swimmer
- Francesca Martinez, British stand-up comedian and actress.
- Zak Ford-Williams, British stage and screen actor, known for Lord Remington in Bridgerton, Owen Davies in Better and Harry Hardacre in The Hardacres, as well as Richard III and Joseph Merrick on stage
- Evan O'Hanlon, Australian Paralympian, the fastest athlete with cerebral palsy in the world.
- Arun Shourie's son Aditya, about whom he has written a book Does He Know a Mother's Heart
- Maysoon Zayid, the self-described "Palestinian Muslim virgin with cerebral palsy, from New Jersey", who is an actress, stand-up comedian, and activist. Zayid has been a resident of Cliffside Park, New Jersey. She is considered one of America's first Muslim women comedians and the first person to perform standup in Palestine and Jordan.

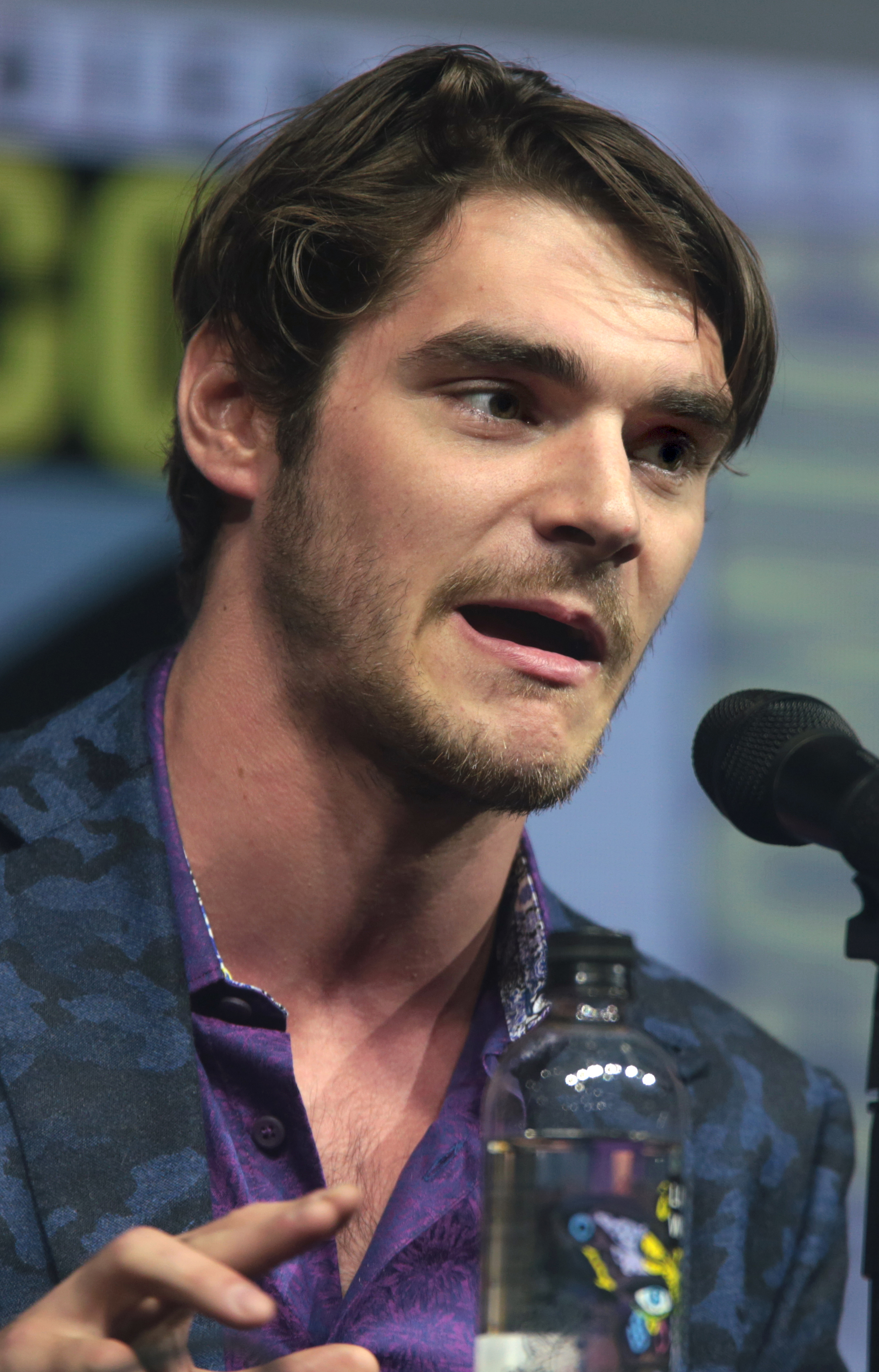
RJ Mitte at the 2018 San Diego Comic-Con

- RJ Mitte, an American actor best known for his role as Walter White Jr. in Breaking Bad. He was also a celebrity ambassador for United Cerebral Palsy.
- Zach Anner, an American comedian, actor, and writer. He had a television series on Oprah Winfrey's OWN called Rollin' With Zach and is the author of If at Birth You Don't Succeed.
- Kaine, a member of the American hip-hop duo The Ying Yang Twins, has a mild form of cerebral palsy that causes him to limp.
- Hannah Cockroft, is a British wheelchair athlete specialising in sprint distances in the T34 classification. She holds the Paralympic and world records for the 100 metres, 200 metres and 400 metres in her classification.
- Keah Brown, American disability rights activist, author and journalist.
- Kuli Kohli, Indian-British writer, poet, activist.
- Simon James Stevens, a British disability issues consultant and activist, who starred in I'm Spazticus and founded Wheelies virtual nightclub
- The Roman Emperor Claudius is hypothesized to have had cerebral palsy on the basis of his reported symptoms.
- Tim Renkow, American comedian, comic actor and writer of the BBC comedy series, Jerk.
- Rosie Jones, a British comedian and actress, is incorporating her cerebral palsy into her comedic style.
- Christopher Nolan, an Irish Poet and Author, he wrote Damn-Burst of Dreams, The Banyan Tree, and Under The Eye Of The Clock. He died in 2009.
- Lost Voice Guy, British Comedian, went on Britain's Got Talent and won
- Nujeen Mustafa, Author and disability right awareness refugee from Syria. In 2019 she became the first disabled person to brief the United Nations Security Council, and was the recipient of the Alison Des Forges Award for Extraordinary Activism from Human Rights Watch.
- Lionel Abrahams, South African poet and novelist, founder of the literary magazine Purple Renoster
- Tina Friml, American stand-up comedian
- Micah Fowler, American actor who starred in Speechless

=== Litigation ===
Because of the perception that cerebral palsy is mostly caused by trauma during birth, as of 2005, 60% of obstetric litigation was about cerebral palsy, which Alastair MacLennan, Professor of Obstetrics and Gynaecology at the University of Adelaide, regards as causing an exodus from the profession. In the latter half of the 20th century, obstetric litigation about the cause of cerebral palsy became more common, leading to the practice of defensive medicine.

== See also ==
- Cerebral palsy sport classification – describes the disability sport classification for cerebral palsy.
- Inclusive recreation
- World Cerebral Palsy Day
