= Elnora M. Gilfoyle =

American university administrator

- Born: Elnora Clausing; 1934 (age 90–91); Ottumwa, Iowa, US
- Occupation(s): Occupational therapist, researcher, educator, university administrator
- Years active: 1956–1995
- Spouse: Eugene R. "Gene" Gilfoyle (m. 1958; died 2010)
- Children: 1
- Awards: 1984 Eleanor Clarke Slagle Lectureship; Colorado Women's Hall of Fame, 1996

Elnora M. Gilfoyle (born 1934) is a retired American occupational therapist, researcher, educator, and university administrator. She worked at several hospitals before accepting a professorship at Colorado State University, later serving as Dean of the College of Applied Human Sciences and Provost/Academic Vice President at that university. She is also a past president of the American Occupational Therapy Association. With research interests in child development, developmental disabilities, and child abuse, she has led studies on the state and federal levels. The co-author of two books and many articles, she was inducted into the Colorado Women's Hall of Fame in 1996.

== Early life and education ==
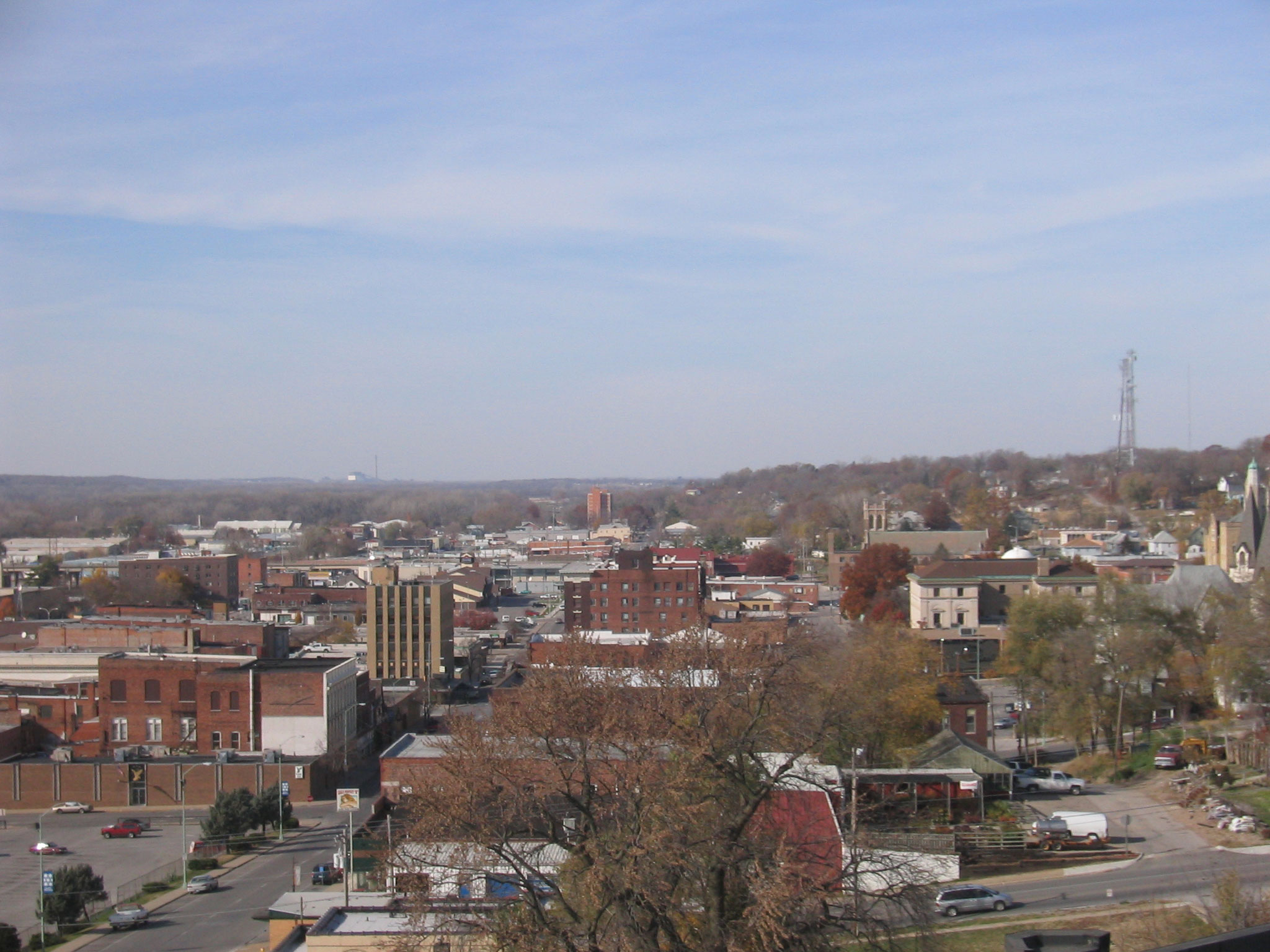
View of downtown Ottumwa

She was born Elnora Clausing in 1934 in Ottumwa, Iowa. She is the youngest of four children of Otto Herman Clausing (1895–1960), a manufacturer, and his wife Alice (née Stark) (1896–1978). The family was German-American and had a strong work ethic. Her father believed that girls could do the same work as boys, and Elnora and her two sisters worked alongside their brother in their father's machine shop.

A graduate of Ottumwa High School, she studied home economics at Iowa State University for two years beginning in 1952. During this time, she accompanied her roommate, an occupational therapy student, to the hospital where she worked and became interested in the discipline. She transferred to the State University of Iowa where she earned her B.A. in occupational therapy in 1956. She was one of the first students to receive a scholarship under the Vocational Rehabilitation Act of 1954, whose goal was to increase vocational rehabilitation practitioners. She earned an Advanced Certificate in professional occupational therapy from the State University of Iowa in 1958.

== Career ==
Gilfoyle relocated to Denver, Colorado, as a graduate student intern in 1956. There she met her husband, Gene Gilfoyle, whom she married in 1958. She first worked as an occupational therapy clinician in the Denver General Hospital. She next moved to the Craig Hospital, where she served as a clinical supervisor in the occupational therapy department, working primarily with patients with spinal cord injuries and brain damage. In the 1960s, she was appointed director of the occupational therapy department at Children's Hospital Colorado.

In 1964 Gilfoyle was named to a fellowship in child development at the Department of Pediatrics at the University of Colorado Health Sciences Center, where she worked until 1966. She was among the first therapists at the new John F. Kennedy Child Development Center, assisting developmentally disabled and abused children. She also involved families in the rehabilitation process at the university's occupational therapy department.

She also taught classes for pediatric occupational students. She became an associate professor at Colorado State University (CSU) in 1981 and a full professor in 1986. In 1988, she was appointed assistant dean of the College of Applied Human Sciences, and head of CSU's department of occupational therapy. She held the post of Dean of the College of Applied Human Sciences from 1989 to 1991, and Provost/Academic Vice President of CSU from 1991 to 1995, being the first woman to hold the latter position. In 1995 she founded and directed CSU's Institute for Women and Leadership.

== Research ==
The Denver Department of Health tapped Gilfoyle to serve on a research team studying developmentally delayed and abused children. The American Occupational Therapy Association (AOTA) appointed her as director of a U.S. Department of Education research grant project that produced a national curriculum to prepare occupational therapists to work with developmentally delayed children in public schools.

In the book Children Adapt (1981), co-authors Gilfoyle, Ann P. Grady, and Josephine C. Moore advanced a developmental theory of spatiotemporal adaptation, which posits that children develop as a result of interaction with their environment. The authors believed that by combining modifications to the child's environment with subcortical learning, an occupational therapist could assist children with developmental disabilities.

Between 1968 and 1991, Gilfoyle secured more than $2 million in funding for occupational therapy research from U.S. government and Colorado state agencies.

== Memberships and affiliations ==
Gilfoyle was a member of various committee and boards for the AOTA, including editorial board member for the American Journal of Occupational Therapy (1970–1975), chair of the Task Force on Organizational Design and Transitional Planning (1975–1978), Secretary (1983–1985 and 1974–1977), and President (1986–1989). She was also President of the Colorado Occupational Therapy Association from 1966 to 1970, and co-chaired the annual conference of the Society for Behavioral Kinesiology in 1972.

== Honors and awards ==
Gilfoyle received numerous commendations and distinguished service awards from the AOTA. She was awarded the 1984 Eleanor Clarke Slagle Lectureship, AOTA's highest academic award. In 1989 AOTA named her as "one of ten individuals nationwide whose contributions have had a significant impact on the practice, education, and research of the profession". She received the association's Award of Merit in 1991. In 2017, AOTA included her on their list of "100 Influential People" in the field.

She received an honorary Doctor of Science degree from Colorado State University in 1981, being the first occupational therapist to receive this degree. She was inducted into the Colorado Women's Hall of Fame in 1996.

== Personal life ==
She married Eugene R. "Gene" Gilfoyle, a Denver native, in 1958. They had one son. They were married for 53 years until her husband's death in November 2010.

== Selected bibliography ==
=== Books ===
- Training: Occupational therapy educational management in schools: A competency-based educational program. American Occupational Therapy Association. 1980. OCLC 8819830. (4 volumes)
- Children Adapt: A theory of sensorimotor-sensory development. C.B. Slack. 1981. ISBN 9780913590744. (with Ann P. Grady, Josephine C. Moore)
- Mentoring Leaders: The Power of Storytelling for Building Leadership in Health Care and Education. AOTA Press. 2011. ISBN 9781569003190. (with Ann Grady, Cathy Nielson, Wendy Coster)

=== Articles ===
- Gilfoyle, E. M. (August 1980). "Caring: A Philosophy for Practice". American Journal of Occupational Therapy. 34 (8): 517–521. doi:10.5014/ajot.34.8.517. PMID 7211636.
- Gilfoyle, Elnora M.; Gliner, Jeffrey A. (1985). "Attitudes Toward Handicapped Children: Impact of an Educational Program". Physical & Occupational Therapy in Pediatrics. 5 (4): 27–41. doi:10.1080/J006v05n04_03. (with Jeffrey A. Gliner)
- Gilfoyle, E. M. (June 1986). "Taking Care of Ourselves as Health Care Providers". American Journal of Occupational Therapy. 40 (6): 387–389. doi:10.5014/ajot.40.6.387. PMID 3717273.
- Gilfoyle, E. M. (1989). "Leadership and Occupational Therapy". American Journal of Occupational Therapy. 43 (9): 567–570. doi:10.5014/ajot.43.9.567. PMID 2817072.
- Gilfoyle, E. M. (May 1987). "Leadership and Management". American Journal of Occupational Therapy. 41 (5): 281–283. doi:10.5014/ajot.41.5.281. PMID 3688140.
- Gilfoyle, E. M.; Christiansen, C. H. (January 1987). "Research: The Quest for Truth and the Key to Excellence". American Journal of Occupational Therapy. 41: 7–8. doi:10.5014/ajot.41.1.7. (with Charles H. Christiansen)
- Gilfoyle, E. M. (August 1988). "Partnerships for the Future". American Journal of Occupational Therapy. 42 (8): 485–488. doi:10.5014/ajot.42.8.485.

=== Videorecording ===
- NDT Feeding Consultation. American Occupational Therapy Association. 1978. OCLC 12929472.

== Sources ==
- Peters, Christine Olga (2014). Powerful Occupational Therapists: A Community of Professionals, 1950–1980. Routledge. ISBN 9781317980872.
- Varnell, Jeanne (1999). Women of Consequence: The Colorado Women's Hall of Fame. Big Earth Publishing. ISBN 978-1555662141.
