= Occupational therapy =

Healthcare profession

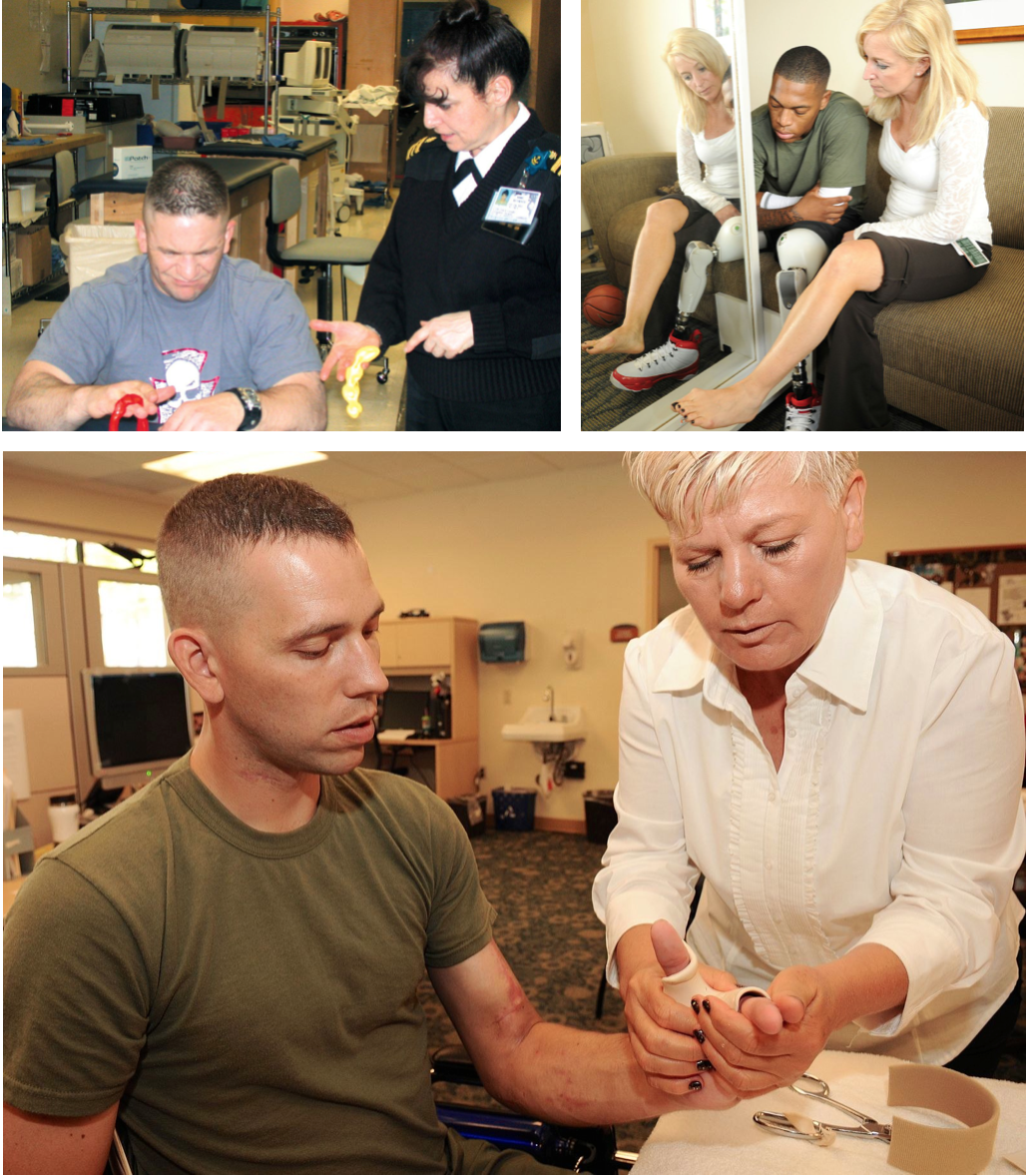
- US Navy Occupational therapists providing treatment to outpatients
- ICD-9-CM: 93.83
- MeSH: D009788

Occupational therapy (OT), also known as ergotherapy in Europe, is a healthcare profession that helps people take part in the everyday activities, or occupations, that are important for daily life. These occupations include self-care tasks, work, school, social participation, and leisure activities.

Occupational therapists work with people who experience illness, injury, disability, or age-related changes that limit their ability to function independently. They assess a person's needs, set goals, and use everyday activities as therapeutic tools. Therapists may also modify tasks, recommend adaptive equipment, or adjust the physical or social environment to support participation.

Occupational therapy began developing into a formal health profession in the early twentieth century. Occupational science, the academic study of humans as 'doers' or 'occupational beings', was developed by interdisciplinary scholars, including occupational therapists, in the 1980s.

The World Federation of Occupational Therapists (WFOT) defines occupational therapy as a "client-centred health profession concerned with promoting health and wellbeing through occupation. The primary goal of occupational therapy is to enable people to participate in the activities of everyday life. Occupational therapists achieve this outcome by working with people and communities to enhance their ability to engage in the occupations they want to, need to, or are expected to do, or by modifying the occupation or the environment to better support their occupational engagement."

Occupational therapy is classified as an allied health profession in many countries. In the United Kingdom, occupational therapists are regulated by the Health and Care Professions Council as part of a group of professions that form the third-largest clinical workforce in the National Health Service. In England, allied health professions (AHPs) are the third largest clinical workforce in health and care. Fifteen professions, with 352,593 registrants, are regulated by the Health and Care Professions Council in the United Kingdom.

== Etymology ==
In Europe, occupational therapy is also known as ergotherapy, derived from the Greek ergon which is allied to work, to act and to be active.

== History ==
The earliest evidence of using occupations as a method of therapy can be found in ancient times. In c. 100 BCE, Greek physician Asclepiades treated patients with a mental illness humanely using therapeutic baths, massage, exercise, and music. Later, the Roman Celsus prescribed music, travel, conversation and exercise to his patients. However, by medieval times the use of these interventions with people with mental illness was rare, if not nonexistent.

=== Moral treatment and graded activity ===
In late 18th-century Europe, doctors such as Philippe Pinel and Johann Christian Reil reformed the mental asylum system. Their institutions used rigorous work and leisure activities. This became part of what was known as moral treatment. Although it was thriving in Europe, interest in the reform movement fluctuated in the United States throughout the 19th century.

In the late 19th and early 20th centuries, the establishment of public health measures to control infectious diseases included the building of fever hospitals. Patients with tuberculosis were recommended to have a regime of prolonged bed rest followed by a gradual increase in exercise.

This was a time in which the rising incidence of disability related to industrial accidents, tuberculosis, and mental illness brought about an increasing social awareness of the issues involved.

The Arts and Crafts movement that took place between 1860 and 1910 also impacted occupational therapy. The movement emerged against the monotony and lost autonomy of factory work in the developed world. Arts and crafts were used to promote learning through doing, provided a creative outlet, and served as a way to avoid boredom during long hospital stays.

From the late 1870s, Scottish tuberculosis doctor Robert William Philip prescribed graded activity from complete rest through to gentle exercise and eventually to activities such as digging, sawing, carpentry and window cleaning. During this period a farm colony near Edinburgh and a village settlement near Papworth in England were established, both of which aimed to employ people in appropriate long-term work prior to their return to open employment.

=== Development into a health profession ===
In the United States, the health profession of occupational therapy was conceived in the early 1910s as a reflection of the Progressive Era. Early professionals merged highly valued ideals, such as having a strong work ethic and the importance of crafting with one's own hands with scientific and medical principles.

American social worker Eleanor Clarke Slagle (1870–1942) is considered the "mother" of occupational therapy. She advocated "habit training" as a primary occupational therapy model, asserting that meaningful routines can shape a person's well-being by creating structure and balance between work, rest and leisure. Slagle was a leader in the development of occupational therapy as a profession, becoming director of a department of occupational therapy at The Henry Phipps Psychiatric Clinic in Baltimore in 1912, and establishing the first occupational therapy training program for the disabled in the Henry B. Favill School of Occupations at Hull House in Chicago in 1915.

=== World War I ===
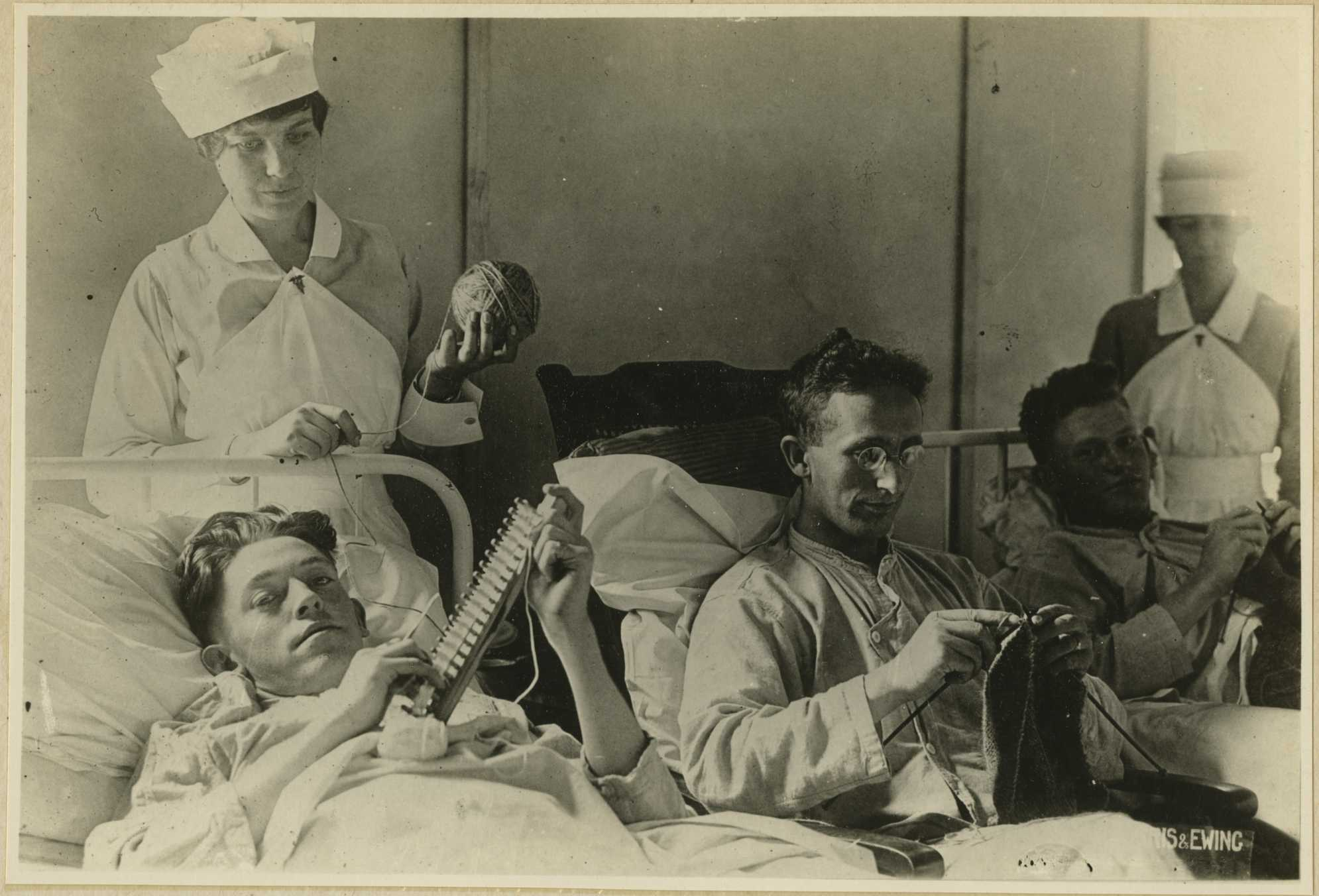
Occupational therapy during WWI: bedridden wounded are knitting.

British-Canadian teacher and architect Thomas B. Kidner was appointed vocational secretary of the Canadian Military Hospitals Commission in January 1916. He was given the duty of preparing soldiers returning from World War I to return to their former vocational duties or retrain soldiers no longer able to perform their previous duties. He developed a program that engaged soldiers recovering from wartime injuries or tuberculosis in occupations even while they were still bedridden. Once the soldiers were sufficiently recovered they would work in a curative workshop and eventually progress to an industrial workshop before being placed in an appropriate work setting. He used occupations (daily activities) as a medium for manual training and helping injured individuals to return to productive duties such as work.

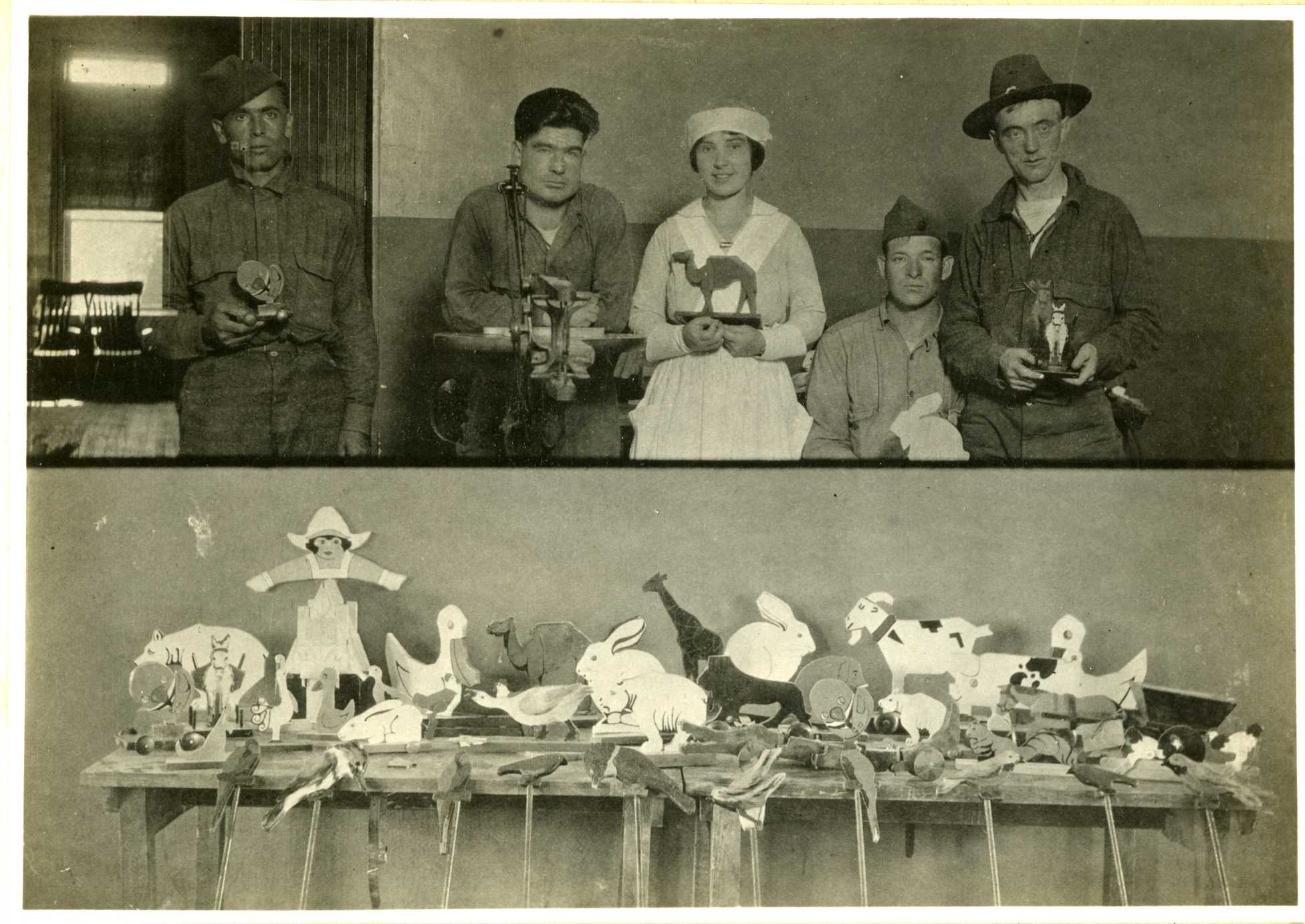
Occupational therapy. Toy making in psychiatric hospital. World War I era.

The entry of the United States into World War I in April 1917 was a crucial event in the history of the profession. Up until this time, occupational therapy was not formalised into a profession. U.S. involvement in the war led to an escalating number of injured and disabled soldiers, which presented a daunting challenge to those in command.

The inaugural meeting of the National Society for the Promotion of Occupational Therapy (NSPOT) was held in Clifton Springs, New York, 15–17 March 1917. The meeting was attended by six founders: George Edward Barton, William Rush Dunton, Eleanor Clarke Slagle, Thomas B Kidner, Susan Cox Johnson and Isabel Gladwin Newton Barton. Susan E. Tracy and Herbert James Hall, did not attend but are considered near founders of the Society.

The military enlisted the assistance of NSPOT to recruit and train over 1,200 "reconstruction aides" to help with the rehabilitation of those wounded in the war.

Dunton's 1918 article "The Principles of Occupational Therapy" appeared in the journal Public Health, and laid the foundation for the textbook he published in 1919 entitled Reconstruction Therapy.

Dunton struggled with "the cumbersomeness of the term occupational therapy", as he thought it lacked the "exactness of meaning which is possessed by scientific terms". Other titles such as "work-cure", "ergo therapy" (ergo being the Greek root for "work"), and "creative occupations" were discussed as substitutes, but ultimately, none possessed the broad meaning that the practice of occupational therapy demanded in order to capture the many forms of treatment that existed from the beginning. NSPOT formally adopted the name "occupational therapy" for the field in 1921.

=== Inter-war period ===
There was a struggle to keep people in the profession during the post-war years. Emphasis shifted from the altruistic war-time mentality to the financial, professional, and personal satisfaction that comes with being a therapist. To make the profession more appealing, practice was standardized, as was the curriculum. Entry and exit criteria were established, and the American Occupational Therapy Association advocated for steady employment, decent wages, and fair working conditions. Via these methods, occupational therapy sought and obtained medical legitimacy in the 1920s.

The emergence of occupational therapy challenged the views of mainstream scientific medicine. Instead of focusing purely on the medical model, occupational therapists argued that a complex combination of social, economic, and biological reasons cause dysfunction. Principles and techniques were borrowed from many disciplines—including but not limited to physical therapy, nursing, psychiatry, rehabilitation, self-help, orthopedics, and social work—to enrich the profession's scope.

The 1920s and 1930s were a time of establishing standards of education and laying the foundation of the profession and its organization. Eleanor Clarke Slagle proposed a 12-month course of training in 1922, and these standards were adopted in 1923. In 1928, William Denton published another textbook, Prescribing Occupational Therapy. Educational standards were expanded to a total training time of 18 months in 1930 to place the requirements for professional entry on par with those of other professions. By the early 1930s, AOTA had established educational guidelines and accreditation procedures.

Margaret Barr Fulton became the first US qualified occupational therapist to work in the United Kingdom in 1925. She qualified at the Philadelphia School in the United States and was appointed to the Aberdeen Royal Hospital for mental patients where she worked until her retirement in 1963. US-style OT was introduced into England by Dr Elizabeth Casson who had visited similar establishments in America. (Casson had also earlier worked under the transformative English social reformer Octavia Hill.) In 1929 she established her own residential clinic in Bristol, Dorset House, for "women with mental disorders", and worked as its medical director. It was here in 1930 that she founded the first school of occupational therapy in the UK.

The Scottish Association of Occupational Therapists was founded in 1932. The profession was served in the rest of the UK by the Association of Occupational Therapists from 1936. (The two later merged to form what is today the Royal College of Occupational Therapists in 1974.)

=== World War II ===
With the US entry into World War II and the ensuing skyrocketing demand for occupational therapists to treat those injured in the war, the field of occupational therapy underwent dramatic growth and change. Occupational therapists needed to be skilled not only in the use of constructive activities such as crafts, but also increasingly in the use of activities of daily living.

The body that is now Occupational Therapy Australia began in 1944.

=== Post-World War II ===
Another textbook was published in the United States for occupational therapy in 1947, edited by Helen S. Willard and Clare S. Spackman. The profession continued to grow and redefine itself in the 1950s. In 1954, AOTA created the Eleanor Clarke Slagle Lectureship Award in its namesake's honor. Each year, this award recognizes a member of AOTA "who has creatively contributed to the development of the body of knowledge of the profession through research, education, or clinical practice." The profession also began to assess the potential for the use of trained assistants in the attempt to address the ongoing shortage of qualified therapists, and educational standards for occupational therapy assistants were implemented in 1960.

The 1960s and 1970s were a time of ongoing change and growth for the profession as it struggled to incorporate new knowledge and cope with the recent and rapid growth of the profession in the previous decades. New developments in the areas of neurobehavioral research led to new conceptualizations and new treatment approaches, possibly the most groundbreaking being the sensory integrative approach developed by A. Jean Ayres.

The profession has continued to grow and expand its scope and settings of practice. Occupational science, the study of occupation, was founded in 1989 by Elizabeth Yerxa at the University of Southern California as an academic discipline to provide foundational research on occupation to support and advance the practice of occupation-based occupational therapy, as well as offer a basic science to study topics surrounding "occupation".

In addition, occupational therapy practitioner's roles have expanded to include political advocacy (from a grassroots base to higher legislation); for example, in 2010 PL 111-148 titled the Patient Protection and Affordable Care Act had a habilitation clause that was passed in large part due to AOTA's political efforts. Furthermore, occupational therapy practitioners have been striving personally and professionally toward concepts of occupational justice and other human rights issues that have both local and global impacts. The World Federation of Occupational Therapist's Resource Centre has many position statements on occupational therapy's roles regarding their participation in human rights issues.

In 2021, U.S. News & World Report ranked occupational therapy as #19 of their list of '100 Best Jobs'.

== Practice frameworks ==
An occupational therapist works systematically with a client through a sequence of actions called an "occupational therapy process." There are several versions of this process. All practice frameworks include the components of evaluation (or assessment), intervention, and outcomes. This process provides a framework through which occupational therapists assist and contribute to promoting health and ensures structure and consistency among therapists.

=== Occupational Therapy Practice Framework (OTPF, United States) ===
The Occupational Therapy Practice Framework (OTPF) is the core competency of occupational therapy in the United States. The OTPF is divided into two sections: domain and process. The domain includes environment, client factors, such as the individual's motivation, health status, and status of performing occupational tasks. The domain looks at the contextual picture to help the occupational therapist understand how to diagnose and treat the patient. The process is the actions taken by the therapist to implement a plan and strategy to treat the patient.

=== Canadian Practice Process Framework ===
The Canadian Model of Client Centered Enablement (CMCE) embraces occupational enablement as the core competency of occupational therapy and the Canadian Practice Process Framework (CPPF) as the core process of occupational enablement in Canada. The Canadian Practice Process Framework (CPPF) has eight action points and three contextual element which are: set the stage, evaluate, agree on objective plan, implement plan, monitor/modify, and evaluate outcome. A central element of this process model is the focus on identifying both client and therapists strengths and resources prior to developing the outcomes and action plan.

=== International Classification of Functioning, Disability and Health (ICF) ===
The International Classification of Functioning, Disability and Health (ICF) is the World Health Organisation's framework to measure health and ability by illustrating how these components impact one's function. This relates very closely to the Occupational Therapy Practice Framework, as it is stated that "the profession's core beliefs are in the positive relationship between occupation and health and its view of people as occupational beings". The ICF is built into the 2nd edition of the practice framework. Activities and participation examples from the ICF overlap Areas of Occupation, Performance Skills, and Performance Patterns in the framework. The ICF also includes contextual factors (environmental and personal factors) that relate to the framework's context. In addition, body functions and structures classified within the ICF help describe the client factors described in the Occupational Therapy Practice Framework. Further exploration of the relationship between occupational therapy and the components of the ICIDH-2 (revision of the original International Classification of Impairments, Disabilities, and Handicaps (ICIDH), which later became the ICF) was conducted by McLaughlin Gray.

It is noted in the literature that occupational therapists should use specific occupational therapy vocabulary along with the ICF in order to ensure correct communication about specific concepts. The ICF might lack certain categories to describe what occupational therapists need to communicate to clients and colleagues. It also may not be possible to exactly match the connotations of the ICF categories to occupational therapy terms. The ICF is not an assessment and specialized occupational therapy terminology should not be replaced with ICF terminology. The ICF is an overarching framework for current therapy practices.

== Occupations ==
According to the American Occupational Therapy Association's (AOTA) Occupational Therapy Practice Framework: Domain and Process, 4th Edition (OTPF-4), occupations are defined as "everyday activities that people do as individuals, and families, and with communities to occupy time and bring meaning and purpose to life. Occupations include things people need to, want to and are expected to do". Occupations are central to a client's (person's, group's, or population's) health, identity, and sense of competence and have particular meaning and value to that client. Occupations include activities of daily living (ADLs), instrumental activities of daily living (IADLs), education, work, play, leisure, social participation, rest and sleep.

== Practice settings ==
According to the 2019 Salary and Workforce Survey by the American Occupational Therapy Association, occupational therapists work in a wide-variety of practice settings including: hospitals (28.6%), schools (18.8%), long-term care facilities/skilled nursing facilities (14.5%), free-standing outpatient (13.3%), home health (7.3%), academia (6.9%), early intervention (4.4%), mental health (2.2%), community (2.4%), and other (1.6%). According to the AOTA, the most common primary work setting for occupational therapists is in hospitals. Also according to the survey, 46% of occupational therapists work in urban areas, 39% work in suburban areas and the remaining 15% work in rural areas.

The Canadian Institute for Health Information (CIHI) found that as of 2020 nearly half (46.1%) of occupational therapists worked in hospitals, 43.2% worked in community health, 3.6% work in long-term care (LTC) and 7.1% work in "other", including government, industry, manufacturing, and commercial settings. The CIHI also found that 68% of occupational therapists in Canada work in urban settings and only 3.7% work in rural settings.

== Education ==
Worldwide, there is a range of qualifications required to practice as an occupational therapist or occupational therapy assistant. Depending on the country and expected level of practice, degree options include associate degree, Bachelor's degree, entry-level master's degree, post-professional master's degree, entry-level Doctorate (OTD), post-professional Doctorate (DrOT or OTD), Doctor of Clinical Science in OT (CScD), Doctor of Philosophy in Occupational Therapy (PhD), and combined OTD/PhD degrees.

Both occupational therapist and occupational therapy assistant roles exist internationally. Currently in the United States, dual points of entry exist for both OT and OTA programs. For OT, that is entry-level Master's or entry-level Doctorate. For OTA, that is associate degree or bachelor's degree.

The World Federation of Occupational Therapists (WFOT) has minimum standards for the education of OTs, which was revised in 2016. All of the educational programs around the world need to meet these minimum standards. These standards are subsumed by and can be supplemented with academic standards set by a country's national accreditation organization. As part of the minimum standards, all programs must have a curriculum that includes practice placements (fieldwork). Examples of fieldwork settings include: acute care, inpatient hospital, outpatient hospital, skilled nursing facilities, schools, group homes, early intervention, home health, and community settings.

The profession of occupational therapy is based on a wide theoretical and evidence based background. The OT curriculum focuses on the theoretical basis of occupation through multiple facets of science, including occupational science, anatomy, physiology, biomechanics, and neurology. In addition, this scientific foundation is integrated with knowledge from psychology, sociology and more.

In the United States, Canada, and other countries around the world, there is a licensure requirement. In order to obtain an OT or OTA license, one must graduate from an accredited program, complete fieldwork requirements, and pass a national certification examination.

== Philosophical underpinnings ==
The philosophy of occupational therapy has evolved over the history of the profession. The philosophy articulated by the founders owed much to the ideals of romanticism, pragmatism and humanism, which are collectively considered the fundamental ideologies of the past century.

One of the most widely cited early papers about the philosophy of occupational therapy was presented by Adolf Meyer, a psychiatrist who had emigrated to the United States from Switzerland in the late 19th century and who was invited to present his views to a gathering of the new Occupational Therapy Society in 1922. At the time, Dr. Meyer was one of the leading psychiatrists in the United States and head of the new psychiatry department and Phipps Clinic at Johns Hopkins University in Baltimore, Maryland.

William Rush Dunton, a supporter of the National Society for the Promotion of Occupational Therapy, now the American Occupational Therapy Association, sought to promote the ideas that occupation is a basic human need, and that occupation is therapeutic. From his statements came some of the basic assumptions of occupational therapy, which include:

- Occupation has a positive effect on health and well-being.
- Occupation creates structure and organizes time.
- Occupation brings meaning to life, culturally and personally.
- Occupations are individual. People value different occupations.

These assumptions have been developed over time and are the basis of the values that underpin the Codes of Ethics issued by the national associations. The relevance of occupation to health and well-being remains the central theme.

In the 1950s, criticism from medicine and the multitude of disabled World War II veterans resulted in the emergence of a more reductionistic philosophy. While this approach led to developments in technical knowledge about occupational performance, clinicians became increasingly disillusioned and re-considered these beliefs. As a result, client centeredness and occupation have re-emerged as dominant themes in the profession. Over the past century, the underlying philosophy of occupational therapy has evolved from being a diversion from illness, to treatment, to enablement through meaningful occupation.

Three commonly mentioned philosophical precepts of occupational therapy are that occupation is necessary for health, that its theories are based on holism and that its central components are people, their occupations (activities), and the environments in which those activities take place. However, there have been some dissenting voices. Mocellin, in particular, advocated abandoning the notion of health through occupation as he proclaimed it obsolete in the modern world. As well, he questioned the appropriateness of advocating holism when practice rarely supports it. Some values formulated by the American Occupational Therapy Association have been critiqued as being therapist-centric and do not reflect the modern reality of multicultural practice.

In recent times occupational therapy practitioners have challenged themselves to think more broadly about the potential scope of the profession, and expanded it to include working with groups experiencing occupational injustice stemming from sources other than disability. Examples of new and emerging practice areas would include therapists working with refugees, children experiencing obesity, and people experiencing homelessness.

== Theoretical frameworks ==
A distinguishing facet of occupational therapy is that therapists often espouse the use theoretical frameworks to frame their practice. Many have argued that the use of theory complicates everyday clinical care and is not necessary to provide patient-driven care.

Note that terminology differs between scholars. An incomplete list of theoretical bases for framing a human and their occupations include the following:

=== Generic models ===
Generic models are the overarching title given to a collation of compatible knowledge, research and theories that form conceptual practice. More generally they are defined as "those aspects which influence our perceptions, decisions and practice".

- The Person Environment Occupation Performance model (PEOP) was originally published in 1991 (Charles Christiansen & M. Carolyn Baum) and describes an individual's performance based on four elements including: environment, person, performance and occupation. The model focuses on the interplay of these components and how this interaction works to inhibit or promote successful engagement in occupation.

Occupation-focused practice models

- Occupational Therapy Intervention Process Model (OTIPM) (Anne Fisher and others)
- Occupational Performance Process Model (OPPM)
- Model of Human Occupation (MOHO) (Gary Kielhofner and others)
  - MOHO was first published in 1980. It explains how people select, organise and undertake occupations within their environment. The model is supported with evidence generated over thirty years and has been successfully applied throughout the world.
- Canadian Model of Occupational Performance and Engagement (CMOP-E)

This framework was originated in 1997 by the Canadian Association of Occupational Therapists (CAOT) as the Canadian Model of Occupational Performance (CMOP). It was expanded in 2007 by Palatjko, Townsend and Craik to add engagement. This framework upholds the view that three components—the person, environment and occupation- are related. Engagement was added to encompass occupational performance. A visual model is depicted with the person located at the center of the model as a triangle. The triangles three points represent cognitive, affective, and physical components with a spiritual center. The person triangle is surrounded by an outer ring symbolizing the context of environment with an inner ring symbolizing the context of occupation.

- Occupational Performances Model – Australia (OPM-A) (Chris Chapparo & Judy Ranka)
  - The OPM(A) was conceptualized in 1986 with its current form launched in 2006. The OPM(A) illustrates the complexity of occupational performance, the scope of occupational therapy practice, and provides a framework for occupational therapy education.
- Kawa (River) Model (Michael Iwama)
- Biopsychosocial models
  - Engel's biopsychosocial model takes into account how disease and illness can be impacted by social, environmental, psychological and body functions. The biopsychosocial model is unique in that it takes the client's subjective experience and the client-provider relationship as factors to wellness. This model also factors in cultural diversity as many countries have different societal norms and beliefs. This is a multifactorial and multi-dimensional model to understand not only the cause of disease but also a person-centered approach that the provider has more of a participatory and reflective role.
  - Other models which incorporate biology (body and brain), psychology (mind), and social (relational, attachment) elements influencing human health include interpersonal neurobiology (IPNB), polyvagal theory (PVT), and the dynamic-maturational model of attachment and adaptation (DMM). The latter two in particular provide detail about the source, mechanism and function of somatic symptoms. Kasia Kozlowska describes how she uses these models to better connect with clients, to understand complex human illness, and how she includes occupational therapists as part of a team to address functional somatic symptoms. Her research indicates children with functional neurological disorders (FND) utilize higher, or more challenging, DMM self-protective attachment strategies to cope with their family environments, and how those impact functional somatic symptoms.
  - Pamela Meredith and colleagues have been exploring the relationship between the attachment system and psychological and neurobiological systems with implications for how occupational therapists can improve their approach and techniques. They have found correlations between attachment and adult sensory processing, distress, and pain perception. In a literature review, Meredith identified a number of ways that occupational therapists can effectively apply an attachment perspective, sometimes uniquely.

=== Frames of reference ===
Frames of reference are an additional knowledge base for the occupational therapist to develop their treatment or assessment of a patient or client group. Though there are conceptual models (listed above) that allow the therapist to conceptualise the occupational roles of the patient, it is often important to use further reference to embed clinical reasoning. Therefore, many occupational therapists will use additional frames of reference to both assess and then develop therapy goals for their patients or service users.

- Biomechanical frame of reference
  - The biomechanical frame of reference is primarily concerned with motion during occupation. It is used with individuals who experience limitations in movement, inadequate muscle strength or loss of endurance in occupations. The frame of reference was not originally compiled by occupational therapists, and therapists should translate it to the occupational therapy perspective, to avoid the risk of movement or exercise becoming the main focus.
- Rehabilitative (compensatory)
- Neurofunctional (Gordon Muir Giles and Clark-Wilson)
- Dynamic systems theory
- Client-centered frame of reference
  - This frame of reference is developed from the work of Carl Rogers. It views the client as the center of all therapeutic activity, and the client's needs and goals direct the delivery of the occupational therapy process.
- Cognitive-behavioural frame of reference
- Ecology of human performance model
- The recovery model
- Sensory integration
  - Sensory integration framework is commonly implemented in clinical, community, and school-based occupational therapy practice. It is most frequently used with children with developmental delays and developmental disabilities such as autism spectrum disorder, Sensory processing disorder and dyspraxia. Core features of sensory integration in treatment include providing opportunities for the client to experience and integrate feedback using multiple sensory systems, providing therapeutic challenges to the client's skills, integrating the client's interests into therapy, organizing of the environment to support the client's engagement, facilitating a physically safe and emotionally supportive environment, modifying activities to support the client's strengths and weaknesses, and creating sensory opportunities within the context of play to develop intrinsic motivation. While sensory integration is traditionally implemented in pediatric practice, there is emerging evidence for the benefits of sensory integration strategies for adults.

== See also ==
- Busy work
- Occupational apartheid
- Occupational therapy and substance use disorder
- Occupational therapy in the management of cerebral palsy
- Occupational therapy in Greece
- Occupational therapy in the United Kingdom
- Occupational therapy in the United States
