= Occupational therapy and substance use disorder =

Substance use disorders (SUD) can have a significant effect on one's function in all areas of occupation. Physical and psychosocial issues due to SUD can impact occupational performance. Unfulfilled life roles and disruption in meaningful activity can result from lack of structure or routine, poor motivation, limited skills, and poor social networks. These deficits may also contribute to stress, affecting the ability to cope with challenges. While SUD can affect a client's participation in therapy and ability to follow recommendations, occupational therapists are trained to facilitate occupational participation and performance.

== Interventions ==
Occupational Therapists (OT) address substance use through focus on self-care, leisure, and productivity, and may encounter SUD in a variety of settings. OTs address substance use by determining occupational needs, executing assessments and interventions, and creating appropriate prevention programs. They evaluate a client's ability to function, help them set short- and long-term goals, and evaluate their likelihood for relapse.

An OT session for SUD may address: development of coping strategies, rebuilding roles, balancing responsibilities, managing money, effectively communicating with others, and developing stress management skills.

With technological advances, occupational therapists can use telehealth services as a way to offer school-based wellness programs such as education on healthy lifestyles, violence prevention and other health programs.

In order to provide health and wellness, habilitation, and rehabilitation services across various practice settings, emerging technologies are poised to be advantageous for occupational therapy practitioners and their patients.

Occupational therapists that work in behavioral health treatment programs can work closely with peer specialists to offer recovery and support services. Collaboration with peer specialists is important in addressing complex issues that surround mental illness and addiction.

Sustaining recovery is addressed through stress and anger management, modifications to social behavior, occupational exploration, and development of life skills. Through improvements in occupational performance, clients with SUD can improve their quality of life and sustain recovery.

== Frames of reference ==
Two frames of reference employed by OTs are Dr. Gary Kielhofner's model of human occupation (MOHO) and cognitive behavioral frame of reference. MOHO focuses on the effects a SUD has on volition, habituation, and performance. Cognitive-behavioral frame of reference focuses on skill building. The client identifies negative thoughts affecting function or skills, finds alternative thoughts for replacement, and rehearses or role plays situations while implementing these alternative thoughts.
