= Thomas B. Kidner =

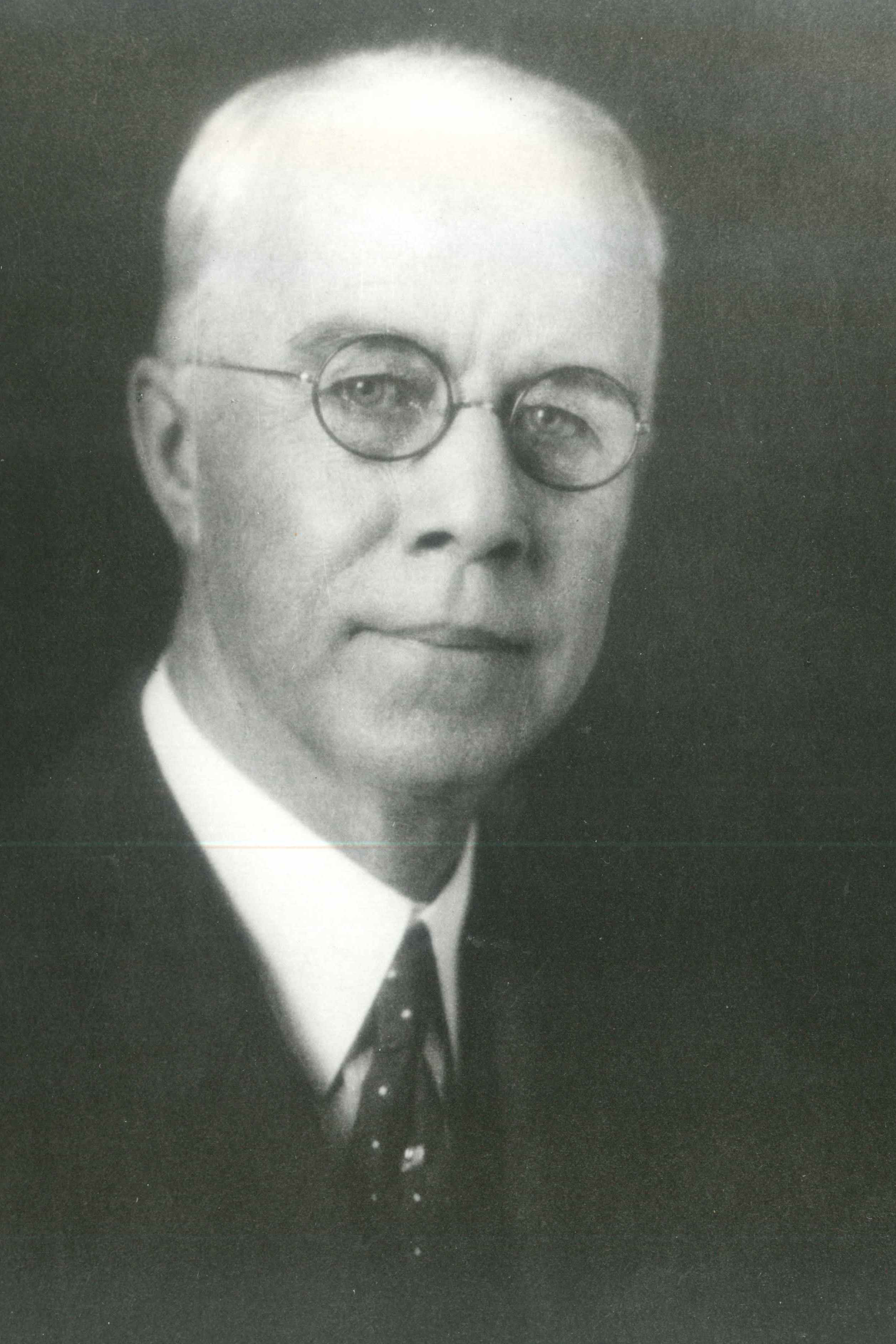
Headshot of Thomas B. Kidner.

Thomas B. Kidner (1866–1932) was one of the founders of the National Society for the Promotion of Occupational Therapy (NSPOT) later renamed the American Occupational Therapy Association (AOTA). He served as president of the society from 1923 to 1928.

== Life ==
Kidner was born in 1866 in Bristol, England, the son of Robert Kidner and Mary Ann Bessell Kidner.

In 1890, he married Emily Edith Allen; they had three children.

He migrated to Canada in 1900 as one of three teachers selected by the Macdonald Manual Training Fund of Canada to introduce technical education to elementary school children. While in Canada he had many roles in education and passionately incorporated manual training into his programs including the programs to rehabilitate soldiers returning from World War I in Canada he ran from 1916 until coming to the United States. These programs gained the attention of Eleanor Clark Slagle, Elizabeth Upham-Davis, and members of the US Federal Board for Vocational Education.

These programs were a product of Kidner's time as the vocational secretary of the Military Hospitals Commission. After being named vocational secretary he promptly moved to Ottawa in January 1916. In Ottawa, he was given the duty of preparing soldiers returning from World War I to return to their former vocational duties or retrain soldiers no longer able to perform their previous duties. He developed a program that engaged soldiers recovering from wartime injuries or tuberculosis in occupations even while they were still bedridden. Once the soldiers were sufficiently recovered they would work in a curative workshop and eventually progress to an industrial workshop before being placed in an appropriate work setting. He used occupations (daily activities) as a medium for manual training and helping injured individuals to return to productive duties such as work.

While involved with NSPOT, he used his background as an architect to help build the foundation for occupational therapy including pushing for a national registry and training standards to ensure that occupational therapists were properly trained to treat clients. He also pushed for occupational therapy to stay within the medical field. Kidner's association with the medical professional association in the United States to head towards this goal and even helped push for the occupational therapy insignia to include components of the medical insignia.

He is credited with bringing crafts, in general, as the intervention for treatment in occupational therapy beginning at the Military Hospitals Commission in Ottawa, Ontario, Canada. Within AOTA, his main concern was to establish the structure and function of the association. He began a registry of therapists and instituted standards in education and desired all therapists to promote OT and keep the profession in the public eye.

After leaving NSPOT/AOTA, Kidner worked with the National Tuberculosis Association, as the head of the Advisory Service on Institutional Construction until 1926. He then returned to his original occupation, working as an architect from 1926 until his death. He died suddenly at the home of his son, Arthur, in Beechhurst, NY, on June 14, 1932.
