= Susan E. Tracy =

American nurse and occupational therapist (1864–1928)

Susan Edith Tracy (January 22, 1864 – September 12, 1928) was an American registered nurse who developed invalid occupations (i.e. occupations for invalids) as a branch of nursing.^{:118} Tracy was a founder member of the National Society for the Promotion of Occupational Therapy. She was an educator and author, instigating the first training course about occupation and writing the first textbook about the therapeutic benefits of occupation.

== Early life ==
Tracy was the youngest child of Cyrus Mason Tracy (1824–1891) and Caroline Mary Tracy, née Needham (1824–1889). The Tracy family lived in Lynn, Massachusetts. Her father was a botanist and professor of medical material at the Massachusetts College of Pharmacy. Tracy had two sisters and a brother: Laura Caroline Hosmer, née Tracy (1850–1937), George Lowell (1855–1921) and Julia Mason Nutting, née Tracy (1858–1942). Her parents and brother were musical. Cyrus was an amateur composer and flautist; her mother was a pianist who sang in her church's choir. Her brother George Lowell Tracy was a composer, conductor, arranger, and instructor. Tracy attributed her skills in many crafts to learning beside her mother as a child.^{:52}

== Nursing career ==
Tracy graduated as a registered nurse from the Massachusetts Homeopathic Hospital School of Nursing, Boston in 1889. Tracy's interest in occupation started during her training when she observed that patients on the surgical wards who were occupied, were happier than those who were idle.^{:32} She then worked as a private nurse which confirmed ‘the occupation training dear to my heart is the experience of its need through seven years of private work of all sorts’.^{:16} Tracy studied at the Teachers College, Columbia University, New York in 1905, attending courses in crafts and hospital economics.^{:32}

In 1905, Tracy was appointed director of the Training School for Nurses at the Adams-Nervine Asylum, Boston by Daniel H. Fuller, the resident physician. He preferred active therapies for patients with ‘neurasthenia’ rather than the rest cure.^{:51} Tracy described how work was used to treat ‘many forms for nervous invalidism’ at the hospital. Occupation was prescribed by the physician who ordered ‘a certain sort of work for a definite time’ which was supervised by a qualified teacher.^{:176}

Tracy believed nurses were ‘best suited’ to teach occupations because they understood ‘the limitations imposed by all sorts of diseases’. She illustrated her argument with practical exemplars, such as nurse should ‘be able to find just the thing which a person suffering from chest troubles might safely do without aggravating symptoms’.^{:16}

In 1906 Tracy introduced the study of occupation into the nursing curriculum at the Training School. Students completed a one-hour course for ten weeks where they worked with ten ‘representative patients taking them as we find them’ and learned to do many things. This was likely to benefit ‘the public to whom we send our graduates’. It was the first training course about occupation.^{:251}

Tracy taught nursing students and nurses about using occupation to aid recovery. She led courses at the Teachers College from 1910 to 1913, Massachusetts General Hospital in 1911,^{:33} at the Newton and Children's Hospital and Simmons College, Boston in 1916,^{:255} and Michael Reese and Rush Presbyterian Hospitals in Chicago in 1917 where it became ‘a definite part of the hospital routine and of the nurses’ training course. This is peculiarly nurses' work’.^{:1111}

=== Invalid occupations ===
Tracy developed the concept of invalid occupations, which encompassed any purposeful, orderly activity of the mind and body. She theorised, taught, investigated and published about this treatment. Tracy believed that ‘the holding of the mind to a normal pursuit is favourable to improvement or even recovery’.^{:170} She stressed ‘the great necessity of occupational work in the various phases of illness and convalescence … (and) training which would enable the nurse to adapt the work to the tastes and capacities and conditions of the patient.^{:765}

Tracy wrote some of the earliest analyses of therapeutic occupation. In 1907, her article 'Some Profitable Occupations for Invalids' was published in the American Journal of Nursing. She distinguished between ‘amusements (which) serve to pass time away’ and ‘occupations (that) treasure and redeem the time’.^{:172} Tracy illustrated this difference with case studies of using occupation with children, adults and older people. In 1916, Tracy reports an early activity analysis when she compared the tools, methods and benefits of rake knitting with knitting with needles. ‘Rake knitting requires little more than finger motion, so that a patient who is extensively paralyzed can carry on this form of knitting … (whereas) common knitting done by a patient on her back in bed requires a raising of the elbows at each stitch, which adds much to the fatigue of the process’.^{:7}

Her book, Studies in Invalid Occupation. A Manual for Nurses and Attendants (1910), was the first textbook on the subject.^{:33} Tracy presented a systematic approach to using occupation as treatment for many physical and mental disorders. She advocated learning by doing and through experience, following the concepts of John Dewey^{:256} Tracy outlined principles that included choice of occupation; care for the individual as a whole: body, mind, and soul; occupation as a means rather than an end and that an imperfect product was better than no product.^{:262} The book received positive reviews. It was described as ‘most agreeable reading, Miss Tracy having a keen sense of humour, a large fund of sympathy for the shut-ins, and a realizing sense of the disadvantages that this class labours under’.^{:495} Tracy's book was reprinted and widely used until at least 1940.^{:50}

Tracy promoted invalid occupations at national events. There was a display of ‘experimental work in the new field of occupations for invalids’ at the 1910 meeting of the American Society of Superintendents of Training Schools for Nurses.^{:49} The exhibitors included Herbert James Hall and Tracy, two founder members of the National Society for the Promotion of Occupational Therapy. In September 1911, she exhibited ‘Invalid Occupations’ at the American Hospital Association conference, held at the Manhattan Hotel in New York.

In 1912 Tracy left the Adams-Nervine Asylum to set up the Experiment Station for the Study of Invalid Occupations in Jamaica Plain, Boston. This was a resource centre with case studies and information; and a venue for courses, demonstrations, exhibitions and private instruction.^{:33} Tracy wanted to establish a network of ‘bureau for training occupational nurses in every large city’ to enable nurses to gain control of, and status from, using these specialised skills in hospitals and patients’ homes.^{:55}

The January 1917 issue of the Maryland Psychiatric Quarterly was named ‘The Susan E. Tracy Number’. The journal editor was William Rush Dunton, another founder of occupational therapy. Tracy was credited with founding Invalid Occupations as a branch of nursing and providing the first systematic training about occupation.^{:118}

=== Pioneer in occupational therapy ===
Tracy was invited to the inaugural meeting of the National Society for the Promotion of Occupational Therapy. George Edward Barton and William Rush Dunton, the organisers, selected a few people who were interested in the therapeutic value of occupation. The meeting was held in Consolation House, Clifton Springs, New York on 15 to 17 March 1917. Tracy sent her apologies. She was teaching occupations courses for nurses in Chicago. Tracy was one of five members of the Board of Management and chairman of the Committee of Teaching Methods.^{:42}

As chair of the committee between 1917 and 1921, Tracy shaped the first educational standards for occupational therapy training. She recruited committee members and produced an outline curriculum. They surveyed institutions because Tracy considered understanding the scope of occupational therapy practice was a pre-requisite for formulating educational standards.^{:100-1} Tracy wrote reports on teaching for the Annual Meetings of the Society.^{:56}

In 1921, the Society became the American Occupational Therapy Association. Tracy did not participate in the professionalisation of this new profession, viewing invalid occupations as a speciality of nursing. Tracy returned to nursing until her death in 1928.^{:41}

== Death and legacy ==
Tracy died on 12 September 1928 as a result of a stroke. She was one of the pioneer generation of independent, women professionals in America.^{:61} Her death was reported in the February 1929 issue of Occupational Therapy & Rehabilitation. Tracy was described as a great teacher but not an executive ... she was never well off financially because she never thought of her own interest’.^{:64}

The Board of Management of the American Occupational Therapy Association noted that Tracy was ‘one of the incorporators of this association and a pioneer in occupational therapy’^{:65} Tracy laid the foundations: ‘her greatest work was that of showing that certain occupations had special value of specific conditions. This idea has grown and is believed to be the first step in placing occupational therapy upon a scientific basis’.^{:63} Her book remains significant as a forerunner of modern philosophy and literature of occupational therapy.^{:1708}

In 2017, Tracy was identified as 1 of 100 people who influenced the 100-year history of occupational therapy by the America Occupational Therapy Association.
