= Volition =

Cognitive process of decision to act

Volition, also known as will or conation, is the cognitive process by which an individual decides on and commits to a particular course of action. It is defined as purposive striving and is one of the primary human psychological functions. Others include affect (feeling or emotion), motivation (goals and expectations), and cognition (thinking). Volitional processes can be applied consciously or they can be automatized as habits over time.

Most modern conceptions of volition address it as a process of conscious action control which becomes automatized (e.g. see Heckhausen and Kuhl; Gollwitzer; Boekaerts and Corno).

== Overview ==
Many researchers treat volition and willpower as scientific and colloquial terms (respectively) for the same process. When a person makes up their mind to do a thing, that state is termed 'immanent volition'. When we put forth any particular act of choice, that act is called an emanant, executive, or imperative volition. When an immanent or settled state of choice controls or governs a series of actions, that state is termed predominant volition. Subordinate volitions are particular acts of choice which carry into effect the object sought for by the governing or predominant volition.

According to Gary Kielhofner's "Model of Human Occupation", volition is one of the three sub-systems that act on human behavior. Within this model, volition refers to a person's values, interests and self-efficacy (personal causation) about personal performance. Kurt Lewin argues that motivation and volition are one and the same, in distinction to the nineteenth century psychologist Narziß Ach. Ach proposed that there is a certain threshold of desire that distinguishes motivation from volition: when desire lies below this threshold, it is motivation, and when it crosses over, it becomes volition. In the book A Bias for Action, Heinrich Bruch and Sumantra Ghoshal also differentiate volition (willpower) from motivation. Using this model, they propose assessing individuals' differing levels of commitment with regard to tasks by measuring it on a scale of intent from motivation (an emotion) to volition (a decision). Discussions of impulse control (e.g., Kuhl and Heckhausen) and education (e.g., Corno), also make the motivation-volition distinction. Corno's model ties volition to the processes of self-regulated learning.

== See also ==
- Appetition
- Avolition
- Executive functions
- Free will
- Motivational salience
- Neuroscience of free will
- Self-agency
- Prohairesis
- True Will
