= Occupational therapy in the United States =

Occupational therapy
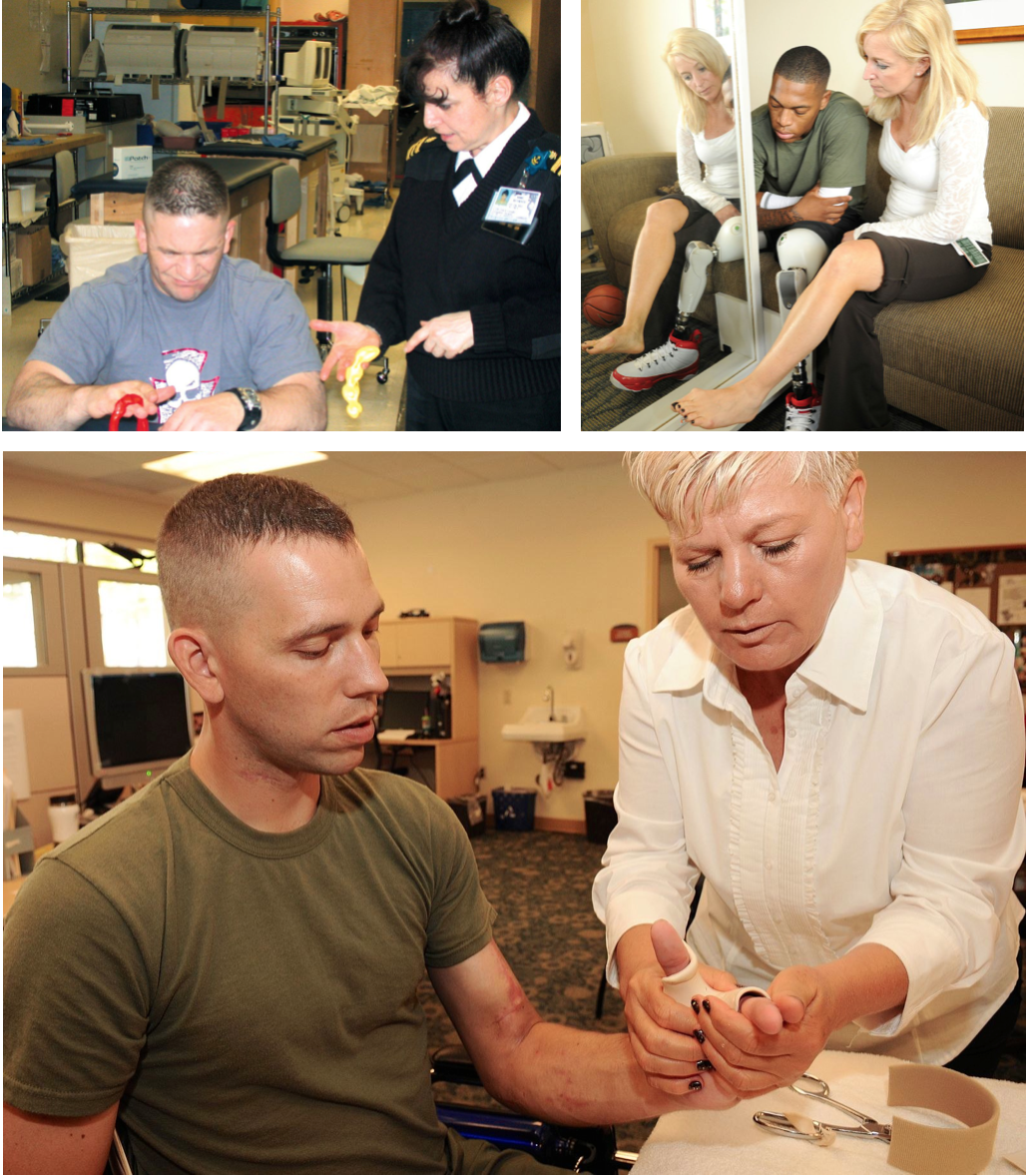
- US Navy Occupational therapists providing treatment to outpatients
- ICD-9-CM: 93.83
- MeSH: D009788

This article discusses occupational therapy (OT) in the United States.

== Children and youth ==
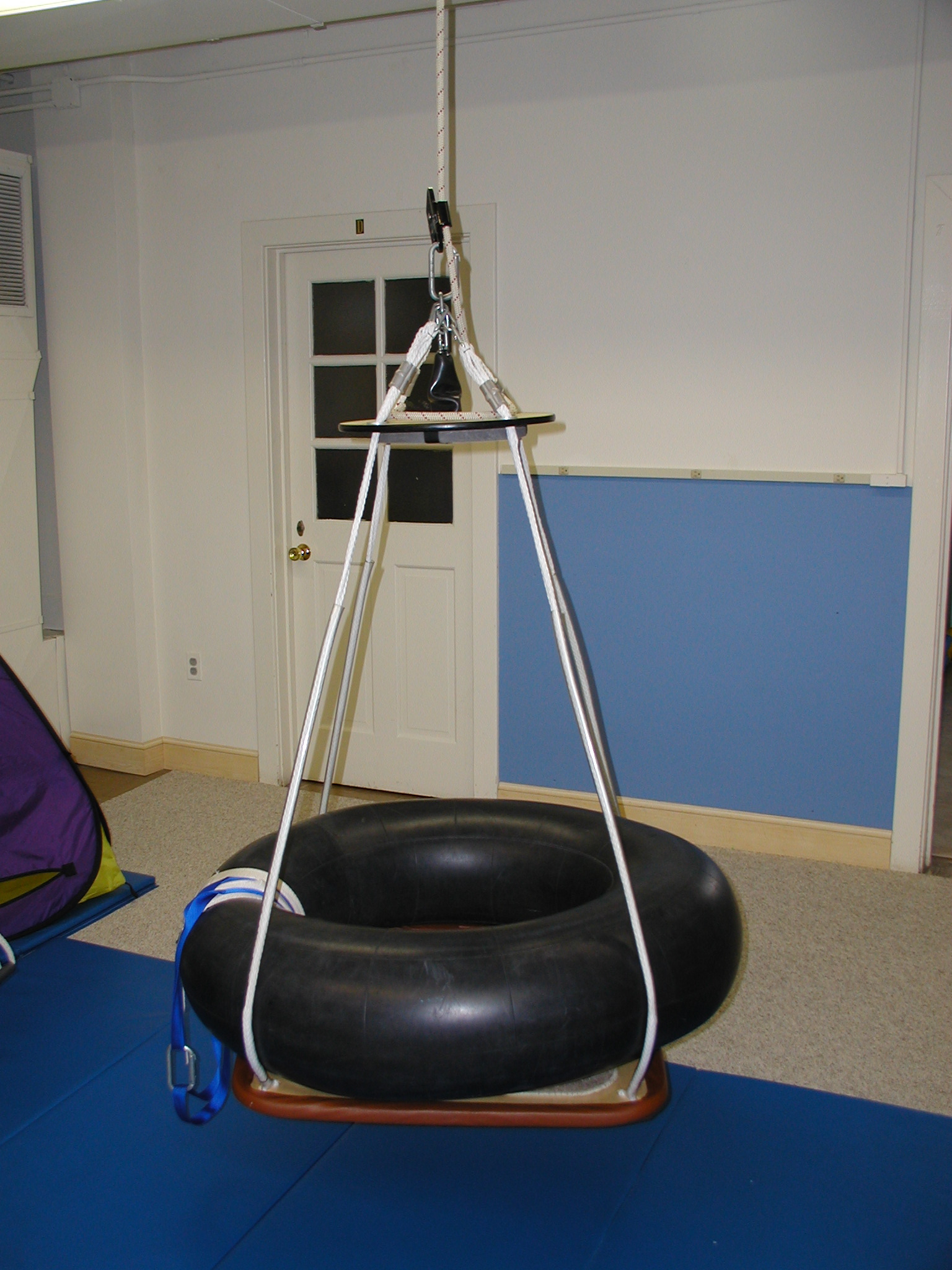
Platform swing with tire used during occupational therapy with children

Occupational therapists work with infants, toddlers, children, youth, and their families in a variety of settings, including schools, clinics, homes, hospitals, and the community. Evaluation assesses the child's ability to engage in daily, meaningful occupations, the underlying skills (or performance components) which may be physical, cognitive, or emotional in nature, and the fit between the client's skills and the environments and contexts in which the client functions. OT intervention and involves evaluating a young person's occupational performance in areas of feeding, playing, socializing which aligns with their neurodiversity, daily living skills, or attending school. In planning treatment, occupational therapists work in collaboration with the children and teens themselves, parents, caregivers, and teachers in order to develop functional goals within a variety of occupations meaningful to the young client.

Early intervention addresses daily functioning of a child between the ages of birth to three years old. OTs who practice in early intervention support a family's ability to care for their child with special needs and promote his or her function and participation in the most natural environment. Each child is required to have an Individualized Family Service Plan (IFSP) that focuses on the family's goals for the child. It's possible for an OT to serve as the family's service coordinator and facilitate the team process for creating an IFSP for each eligible child.

Objectives that an occupational therapist addresses with children and youth may take a variety of forms. Examples are as follows:

- Providing rehabilitation activities to children with neuromuscular disabilities such as cerebral palsy
- Supporting self-regulation within neurodivergent children whose neurobiology does not align with the sensory environment or the contexts in which they function
- Facilitating coping skills to a child with generalized anxiety disorder.
- Consulting with teachers, psychologists, social workers, parents/caregivers, and other professionals who work with children regarding modifications, accommodations and supports in a variety of areas, such as sensory processing, motor planning, visual processing, and executive function skills.
- Providing individualized treatment for sensory processing differences.
- Providing splinting and caregiver education in a hospital burn unit.
- Instructing caregivers in regard to mealtime intervention for autistic children who have feeding challenges.
- Facilitating handwriting development through providing intervention to develop fine motor and writing readiness skills in school-aged children.

In the United States, pediatric occupational therapists work in the school setting as a "related service" for children with an Individual Education Plan (IEP). Every student who receives special education and related services in the public school system is required by law to have an IEP, which is a very individualized plan designed for each specific student (U.S. Department of Education, 2007). Related services are "developmental, corrective, and other supportive services as are required to assist a child with a disability to benefit from special education," and include a variety of professions such as speech–language pathology and audiology services, interpreting services, psychological services, and physical and occupational therapy.

As a related service, occupational therapists work with children with varying disabilities to address those skills needed to access the special education program and support academic achievement and social participation throughout the school day (AOTA, n.d.-b). In doing so, occupational therapists help children fulfill their role as students and prepare them to transition to post-secondary education, career and community integration (AOTA, n.d.-b).

Occupational therapists have specific knowledge to increase participation in school routines throughout the day, including:

- Modification of the school environment to allow physical access for children with disabilities
- Provide assistive technology to support student success
- Helping to plan instructional activities for implementation in the classroom
- Support the needs of students with significant challenges such as helping to determine methods for alternate assessment of learning
- Helping students develop the skills necessary to transition to post-high school employment, independent living or further education (AOTA).

Other settings, such as homes, hospitals, and the community are important environments where occupational therapists work with children and teens to promote their independence in meaningful, daily activities. Outpatient clinics offer a growing OT intervention referred to as "Sensory Integration Treatment". This therapy, provided by experienced and knowledgeable pediatric occupational therapists, was originally developed by A. Jean Ayres, an occupational therapist. Sensory integration therapy is an evidence-based practice which enables children to better process and integrate sensory input from the child's body and from the environment, thus improving his or her emotional regulation, ability to learn, behavior, and functional participation in meaningful daily activities.

Recognition of occupational therapy programs and services for children and youth is increasing worldwide. Occupational therapy for both children and adults is now recognized by the United Nations as a human right which is linked to the social determinants of health. As of 2018, there are over 500,000 occupational therapists working worldwide (many of whom work with children) and 778 academic institutions providing occupational therapy instruction.

== Health and wellness ==
According to the American Occupational Therapy Association's (AOTA) Occupational Therapy Practice Framework, 3rd Edition, the domain of occupational therapy is described as "Achieving health, well-being, and participation in life through engagement in occupation". Occupational therapy practitioners have a distinct value in their ability to utilize daily occupations to achieve optimal health and well-being. By examining an individual's roles, routines, environment, and occupations, occupational therapists can identify the barriers in achieving overall health, well-being and participation.

Occupational therapy practitioners can intervene at primary, secondary and tertiary levels of intervention to promote health and wellness. It can be addressed in all practice settings to prevent disease and injuries, and adapt healthy lifestyle practices for those with chronic diseases. Two of the occupational therapy programs that have emerged targeting health and wellness are the Lifestyle Redesign Program and the REAL Diabetes Program.

Occupational therapy interventions for health and wellness vary in each setting:

=== School ===
Occupational therapy practitioners target school-wide advocacy for health and wellness including: bullying prevention, backpack awareness, recess promotion, school lunches, and PE inclusion. They also heavily work with students with learning disabilities such as those on the autism spectrum.

A study conducted in Switzerland showed that a large majority of occupational therapists collaborate with schools, half of them providing direct services within mainstream school settings. The results also show that services were mainly provided to children with medical diagnoses, focusing on the school environment rather than the child's disability.

=== Outpatient ===
Occupational therapy practitioners conduct 1:1 treatment sessions and group interventions to address: leisure, health literacy and education, modified physical activity, stress/anger management, healthy meal preparation, and medication management.

=== Acute care ===
Occupational therapy practitioners in acute care assess whether a patient has the cognitive, emotional and physical ability as well as the social supports needed to live independently and care for themselves after discharge from the hospital. Occupational therapists are uniquely positioned to support patients in acute care as they focus on both clinical and social determinants of health.

Services delivered by occupational therapists in acute care include:

- Direct rehabilitation interventions, individually or in group settings to address physical, emotional and cognitive skills that are required for the patient to perform self-care and other important activities.
- Caregiver training to assist patients after discharge.
- Recommendations for adaptive equipment for increased safety and independence with activities of daily living (e.g. aids for getting dressed, shower chairs for bathing, and medication organizers for self-administering medications).
- They also perform home safety assessments to suggest modifications for improved safety and function after discharge.

Occupational therapists use a variety of models, including the Model of Human Occupation, Person, Environment and Occupation, and Canadian Occupational Performance Model to adopt a client centered approach used for discharge planning. Hospital spending on occupational therapy services in acute care was found to be the single most significant spending category in reducing the risk of readmission to the hospital for heart failure, pneumonia, and acute myocardial infarction.

=== Community-based ===
Occupational therapy practitioners develop and implement community wide programs to assist in prevention of diseases and encourage healthy lifestyles by: conducting education classes for prevention, facilitating gardening, offering ergonomic assessments, and offering pleasurable leisure and physical activity programs.

== Mental health ==
Mental Health Occupational therapy's foundation in mental health is deeply rooted in the moral treatment movement, which sought to replace the harsh treatment of mental disorders with the establishment of healthy routines and engagement in meaningful activities. This movement significantly influenced the development of occupational therapy, particularly through the contributions of early 20th-century practitioners and theorists like Adolph Meyer, who emphasized a holistic approach to mental health care (Christiansen & Haertl, 2014). According to the American Occupational Therapy Association (AOTA), occupational therapy is based on the principle that "active engagement in occupation promotes, facilitates, supports, and maintains health and participation" (AOTA, 2017). Occupations refer to individuals' activities to structure their time and provide meaning. The primary goals of occupational therapy include promoting physical and mental health and well-being and establishing, restoring, maintaining, and improving function and quality of life for individuals at risk of or affected by physical or mental health disorders (AOTA, 2017).

Education and Professional Qualifications

Occupational therapists require a master's degree or clinical doctorate, while occupational therapy assistants need at least an associate degree. Their education encompasses extensive mental health-related topics, including biological, physical, social, and behavioral sciences, and supervised clinical experiences culminating in full-time internships. Both must pass national examinations and meet state licensure requirements. Occupational therapists apply mental and physical health knowledge, focusing on participation and occupation, using performance-based assessments to understand the relationship between occupational participation and well-being. Their education covers various aspects of mental health, including neurophysiological changes, human development, historical and contemporary perspectives on mental health, and current diagnostic criteria. This comprehensive training prepares occupational therapy practitioners to address the complex interplay of client variables, activity demands, and environmental factors in promoting health and managing health challenges (Bazyk & Downing, 2017). Occupational therapy role in mental health practice

Occupational therapy practitioners play a critical role in mental health by using therapeutic activities to promote mental health and support full participation in life for individuals at risk of or experiencing psychiatric, behavioral, and substance use disorders. They work across the lifespan and in various settings, including homes, schools, workplaces, community environments, hospitals, outpatient clinics, and residential facilities (AOTA,2017). Occupational therapists and occupational therapy assistants assume diverse roles, such as case managers, care coordinators, group facilitators, community mental health providers, consultants, program developers, and advocates. Their interventions aim to facilitate engagement in meaningful occupations, enhance role performance, and improve overall well-being. This involves analyzing, adapting, and modifying tasks and environments to support clients' goals and optimal engagement in daily activities (AOTA, 2017). Occupational therapy practitioners utilize clinical reasoning, informed by various theoretical perspectives and evidence-based approaches, to guide evaluation and intervention. They are skilled in analyzing the complex interplay among client variables, activity demands, and the environments where participation occurs. For individuals experiencing any mental health issues, his or her ability to participate in occupations actively may be hindered. For example, an individual diagnosed with depression or anxiety may experience interruptions in sleep, difficulty completing self-care tasks, decreased motivation to participate in leisure activities, decreased concentration for school or job-related work, and avoidance of social interactions.

Occupational therapy utilizes the public health approach to mental health (WHO, 2001) which emphasizes the promotion of mental health as well as the prevention of, and intervention for, mental illness. This model highlights the distinct value of occupational therapists in mental health promotion, prevention, and intensive interventions across the lifespan (Miles et al., 2010). Below are the three major levels of service:

=== Tier 3: intensive interventions ===
Intensive interventions are provided for individuals with identified mental, emotional, or behavioral disorders that limit daily functioning, interpersonal relationships, feelings of emotional well-being, and the ability to cope with challenges in daily life. Occupational therapy practitioners are committed to the recovery model which focuses on enabling persons with mental health challenges through a client-centered process to live a meaningful life in the community and reach their potential (Champagne & Gray, 2011).

The focus of intensive interventions (direct–individual or group, consultation) is engagement in occupation to foster recovery or "reclaiming mental health" resulting in optimal levels of community participation, daily functioning, and quality of life; functional assessment and intervention (skills training, accommodations, compensatory strategies) (Brown, 2012); identification and implementation of healthy habits, rituals, and routines to support wellness.

=== Tier 2: targeted services ===
Targeted services are designed to prevent mental health problems in persons who are at risk of developing mental health challenges, such as those who have emotional experiences (e.g., trauma, abuse), situational stressors (e.g., physical disability, bullying, social isolation, obesity) or genetic factors (e.g., family history of mental illness). Occupational therapy practitioners are committed to early identification of and intervention for mental health challenges in all settings.

The focus of targeted services (small groups, consultation, accommodations, education) is engagement in occupations to promote mental health and diminish early symptoms; small, therapeutic groups (Olson, 2011); environmental modifications to enhance participation (e.g., create Sensory friendly classrooms, home, or work environments)

=== Tier 1: universal services ===
Universal services are provided to all individuals with or without mental health or behavioral problems, including those with disabilities and illnesses (Barry & Jenkins, 2007). Occupational therapy services focus on mental health promotion and prevention for all: encouraging participation in health-promoting occupations (e.g., enjoyable activities, healthy eating, exercise, adequate sleep); fostering self-regulation and coping strategies (e.g., mindfulness, yoga); promoting mental health literacy (e.g., knowing how to take care of one's mental health and what to do when experiencing symptoms associated with ill mental health). Occupational therapy practitioners develop universal programs and embed strategies to promote mental health and well-being in a variety of settings, from schools to the workplace.

The focus of universal services (individual, group, school-wide, employee/organizational level) is universal programs to help all individuals successfully participate in occupations that promote positive mental health (Bazyk, 2011); educational and coaching strategies with a wide range of relevant stakeholders focusing on mental health promotion and prevention; the development of coping strategies and resilience; environmental modifications and supports to foster participation in health-promoting occupations.

== Productive aging ==
Occupational therapists work with older adults to maintain independence, participate in meaningful activities, and live fulfilling lives. Some examples of areas that occupational therapists address with older adults are driving, aging in place, low vision, and dementia or Alzheimer's disease (AD). When addressing driving, driver evaluations are administered to determine if drivers are safe behind the wheel. To enable independence of older adults at home, occupational therapists perform falls risk assessments, assess clients functioning in their homes, and recommend specific home modifications. When addressing low vision, occupational therapists modify tasks and the environment. While working with individuals with AD, occupational therapists focus on maintaining quality of life, ensuring safety, and promoting independence.

== Geriatrics/productive aging ==
Occupational therapists address all aspects of aging from health promotion to treatment of various disease processes. The goal of occupational therapy for older adults is to ensure that older adults can maintain independence and reduce health care costs associated with hospitalization and institutionalization. In the community, occupational therapists can assess an older adults ability to drive and if they are safe to do so. If it is found that an individual is not safe to drive the occupational therapist can assist with finding alternate transit options. Occupational therapists also work with older adults in their home as part of home care. In the home, an occupational therapist can work on such things as fall prevention, maximizing independence with activities of daily living, ensuring safety and being able to stay in the home for as long as the person wants. An occupational therapist can also recommend home modifications to ensure safety in the home. Many older adults have chronic conditions such as diabetes, arthritis, and cardiopulmonary conditions. Occupational therapists can help manage these conditions by offering education on energy conservation strategies or coping strategies. Not only do occupational therapists work with older adults in their homes, they also work with older adults in hospitals, nursing homes and post-acute rehabilitation. In nursing homes, the role of the occupational therapist is to work with clients and caregivers on education for safe care, modifying the environment, positioning needs and enhancing IADL skills to name a few. In post-acute rehabilitation, occupational therapists work with clients to get them back home and to their prior level of function after a hospitalization for an illness or accident. Occupational therapists also play a unique role for those with dementia. The therapist may assist with modifying the environment to ensure safety as the disease progresses along with caregiver education to prevent burnout. Occupational therapists also play a role in palliative and hospice care. The goal at this stage of life is to ensure that the roles and occupations that the individual finds meaningful continue to be meaningful. If the person is no longer able to perform these activities, the occupational therapist can offer new ways to complete these tasks while taking into consideration the environment along with psychosocial and physical needs. Not only do occupational therapists work with older adults in traditional settings, they also work in senior centre's and ALFs.

== Visual impairment ==
Visual impairment is one of the top 10 disabilities among American adults. Occupational therapists work with other professions, such as optometrists, ophthalmologists, and certified low vision therapists, to maximize the independence of persons with a visual impairment by using their remaining vision as efficiently as possible. AOTA's promotional goal of "Living Life to Its Fullest" speaks to who people are and learning about what they want to do, particularly when promoting the participation in meaningful activities, regardless of a visual impairment. Populations that may benefit from occupational therapy includes older adults, persons with traumatic brain injury, adults with potential to return to driving, and children with visual impairments. Visual impairments addressed by occupational therapists may be characterized into two types including low vision or a neurological visual impairment. An example of a neurological impairment is a cortical visual impairment (CVI) which is defined as "...abnormal or inefficient vision resulting from a problem or disorder affecting the parts of brain that provide sight". The following section will discuss the role of occupational therapy when working with the visually impaired.

Occupational therapy for older adults with low vision includes task analysis, environmental evaluation, and modification of tasks or the environment as needed. Many occupational therapy practitioners work closely with optometrists and ophthalmologists to address visual deficits in acuity, visual field, and eye movement in people with traumatic brain injury, including providing education on compensatory strategies to complete daily tasks safely and efficiently. Adults with a stable visual impairment may benefit from occupational therapy for the provision of a driving assessment and an evaluation of the potential to return to driving. Lastly, occupational therapy practitioners enable children with visual impairments to complete self care tasks and participate in classroom activities using compensatory strategies.

== Adult rehabilitation ==
Occupational therapists address the need for rehabilitation following an injury or impairment. When planning treatment, occupational therapists address the physical, cognitive, psychosocial, and environmental needs involved in adult populations across a variety of settings.

Occupational therapy in adult rehabilitation may take a variety of forms:

- Working with adults with autism at day rehabilitation programs to promote successful relationships and community participation through instruction on social skills
- Increasing the quality of life for an individual with cancer by engaging them in occupations that are meaningful, providing anxiety and stress reduction methods, and suggesting fatigue management strategies
- Coaching individuals with hand amputations how to put on and take off a myoelectrically controlled limb as well as training for functional use of the limb
- Pressure sore prevention for those with sensation loss such as in spinal cord injuries.
- Using and implementing new technology such as speech to text software and Nintendo Wii video games
- Communicating via telehealth methods as a service delivery model for clients who live in rural areas
- Working with adults who have had a stroke to regain their activities of daily living

== Assistive technology ==
Occupational therapy practitioners, or occupational therapists (OTs), are poised to educate, recommend, and promote the use of assistive technology to improve the quality of life for their clients. OTs are able to understand the specific needs of the individual in regards to occupational performance and have a background in activity analysis to focus on helping clients achieve goals. Thus, the use of varied and diverse assistive technology is strongly supported within occupational therapy practice models.

== Travel occupational therapy ==
Because of the rising need for occupational therapy practitioners in the U.S., many facilities are opting for travel occupational therapy practitioners—who are willing to travel, often out of state, to work temporarily in a facility. Assignments can range from 8 weeks to 9 months, but typically last 13–26 weeks in length. Travel therapists work in many different settings, but the highest need for therapists are in home health and skilled nursing facility settings. There are no further educational requirements needed to be a travel occupational therapy practitioner; however, there may be different state licensure guidelines and practice acts that must be followed. According to Zip Recruiter, as of July 2019, the national average salary for a full-time travel therapist is $86,475 with a range between $62,500 to $100,000 across the United States. Most commonly (43%), travel occupational therapists enter the industry between the ages of 21–30.

== Occupational justice ==
The practice area of occupational justice relates to the "benefits, privileges and harms associated with participation in occupations" and the effects related to access or denial of opportunities to participate in occupations. This theory brings attention to the relationship between occupations, health, well-being, and quality of life. Occupational justice can be approached individually and collectively. The individual path includes disease, disability, and functional restrictions. The collective way consists of public health, gender and sexual identity, social inclusion, migration, and environment. The skills of occupational therapy practitioners enable them to serve as advocates for systemic change, impacting institutions, policy, individuals, communities, and entire populations. Examples of populations that experience occupational injustice include refugees, prisoners, homeless persons, survivors of natural disasters, individuals at the end of their life, people with disabilities, elderly living in residential homes, individuals experiencing poverty, children, immigrants, and LGBTQI+ individuals.

For example, the role of an occupational therapist working to promote occupational justice may include:

- Analyzing task, modifying activities and environments to minimize barriers to participation in meaningful activities of daily living.
- Addressing physical and mental aspects that may hinder a person's functional ability.
- Provide intervention that is relevant to the client, family, and social context.
- Contribute to global health by advocating for individuals with disabilities to participate in meaningful activities on a global level. Occupation therapists are involved with the World Health Organization (WHO), non-governmental organizations and community groups and policymaking to influence the health and well-being of individuals with disabilities worldwide

Occupational therapy practitioners' role in occupational justice is not only to align with perceptions of procedural and social justice but to advocate for the inherent need of meaningful occupation and how it promotes a just society, well-being, and quality of life among people relevant to their context. It is recommended to the clinicians to consider occupational justice in their everyday practice to promote the intention of helping people participate in tasks that they want and need to do.

== Occupational injustice ==
In contrast, occupational injustice relates to conditions wherein people are deprived, excluded or denied of opportunities that are meaningful to them. Types of occupational injustices and examples within the OT practice include:

Occupational deprivation: The exclusion from meaningful occupations due to external factors that are beyond the person's control. For example, a person with difficulties with functional mobility may find it challenging to reintegrate into the community due to transportation barriers.

- OTs can help in raising awareness and bringing communities together to reduce occupational deprivation
- OTs can recommend the removal of environmental barriers to facilitate occupation, whilst designing programs that enable engagement.
- Advocacy by providing information to policy to prevent possible unintended occupational deprivation and increase social cohesion and inclusion

Occupational apartheid: The exclusion of a person in chosen occupations due to personal characteristics such as age, gender, race, nationality, or socioeconomic status. An example can be seen in children with developmental disabilities from low socioeconomic backgrounds whose families would opt out of therapy due to financial constraints.

- OTs providing interventions within a segregated population must focus on increasing occupational engagement through large-scale environmental modification and occupational exploration.
- OTs can address occupational engagement through group and individual skill-building opportunities, as well as community-based experiences that explore free and local resources

Occupational marginalization: Relates to how implicit norms of behavior or societal expectations prevent a person from engaging in a chosen occupation. As an example, a child with physical impairments may only be offered table-top leisure activities instead of sports as an extracurricular activity due to the functional limitations caused by his physical impairments.

- OTs can design, develop, and/or provide programs that mitigate the negative impacts of occupational marginalization and enhance optimal levels of performance and wellbeing that enable participation

Occupational imbalance: The limited participation in a meaningful occupation brought about by another role in a different occupation. This can be seen in the situation of a caregiver of a person with a disability who also has to fulfill other roles such as being a parent to other children, a student, or a worker.

- OTs can advocate fostering for supportive environments for participation in occupations that promote individuals' well-being and in advocating for building healthy public policy

Occupational alienation: The imposition of an occupation that does not hold meaning for that person. In the OT profession, this manifests in the provision of rote activities that do not really relate to the goals or the client's interests.

- OTs can develop individualized activities tailored to the interests of the individual to maximize their potential.
- OTs can design, develop and promote programs that can be inclusive and provide a variety of choices that the individual can engage in.

Within occupational therapy practice, injustice may ensue in situations wherein professional dominance, standardized treatments, laws and political conditions create a negative impact on the occupational engagement of our clients. Awareness of these injustices will enable the therapist to reflect on his own practice and think of ways in approaching their client's problems while promoting occupational justice.

=== Community-based therapy ===
As occupational therapy (OT) has grown and developed, community-based practice has blossomed from an emerging area of practice to a fundamental part of occupational therapy practice (Scaffa & Reitz, 2013). Community-based practice allows for OTs to work with clients and other stakeholders such as families, schools, employers, agencies, service providers, stores, day treatment and day care and others who may influence the degree of success the client will have in participating. It also allows the therapist to see what is actually happening in the context and design interventions relevant to what might support the client in participating and what is impeding her or him from participating. Community-based practice crosses all of the categories within which OTs practice from physical to cognitive, mental health to spiritual, all types of clients may be seen in community-based settings. The role of the OT also may vary, from advocate to consultant, direct care provider to program designer, adjunctive services to therapeutic leader.

== Nature-based therapy ==
Nature-based interventions and outdoor activities may be incorporated into occupational therapy practice as they can provide therapeutic benefits in various ways. Examples include therapeutic gardening, animal-assisted therapy (AAT), and adventure therapy.

For instance, parents reported improvement in the emotional regulation and social engagement of their children with autism spectrum disorder (ASD) in a study of parental perceptions regarding the outcomes of AAT conducted with trained dogs. They also observed reductions in problematic behaviors. A source cited in the study found similar results with AAT employing horses and llamas.

Gardening in a group setting may serve as a complementary intervention in stroke rehabilitation; in addition to being mentally restful and conducive to social connection, it helps patients master skills and can remind them of experiences from their past. Royal Rehab's Productive Garden Project in Australia, managed by a horticultural therapist, allows patients and practitioners to participate in meaningful activity outside the usual healthcare settings. Thus, tending a garden helps facilitate experiential activities, perhaps attaining a better balance between clinical and real-life pursuits during rehabilitation, in lieu of mainly relying on clinical interventions.

For adults with acquired brain injury, nature-based therapy has been found to improve motor abilities, cognitive function, and general quality of life. Contributing to a theoretical understanding of such successes in nature-based approaches are: nature's positive impact on problem solving and the refocusing of attention; an innate human connection with, and positive response to, the natural world; an increased sense of well-being when in contact with nature; and the emotional, nonverbal, and cognitive aspects of human-environment interaction.
