= Management of cerebral palsy =

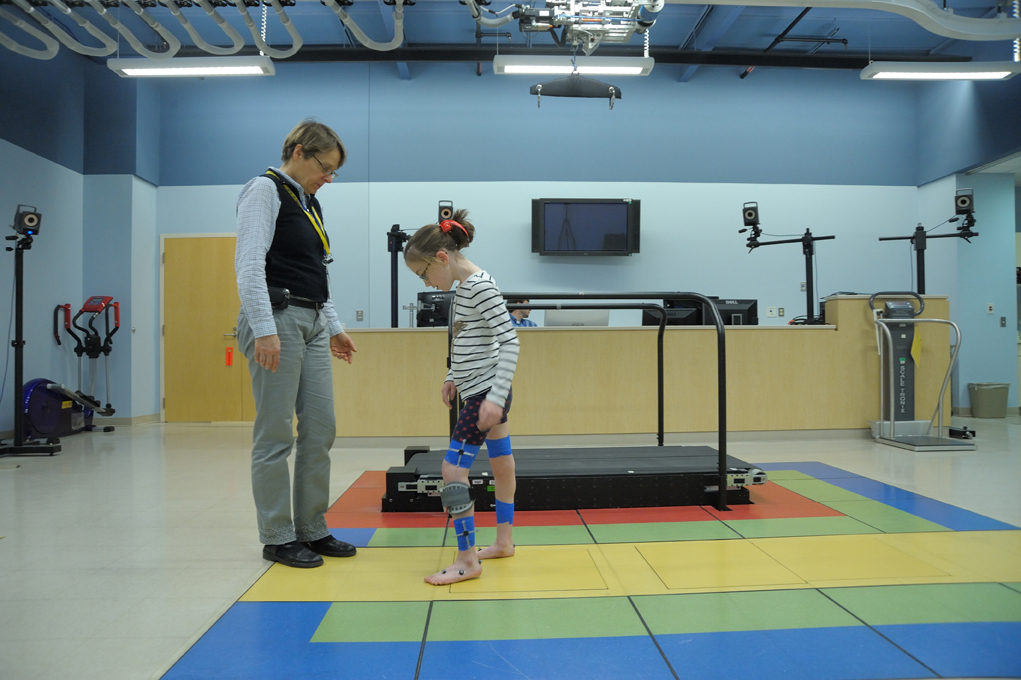
Researchers are developing an electrical stimulation device specifically designed for children with cerebral palsy, who have foot drop which results in tripping when walking.

Over time, the approach to cerebral palsy management has shifted away from narrow attempts to fix individual physical problems – such as spasticity in a particular limb – to making such treatments part of a larger goal of maximizing the person's independence and community engagement. Much of childhood therapy is aimed at improving gait and walking. Approximately 60% of people with CP are able to walk independently or with aids at adulthood. However, the evidence base for the effectiveness of intervention programs reflecting the philosophy of independence has not yet caught up: effective interventions for body structures and functions have a strong evidence base, but evidence is lacking for effective interventions targeted toward participation, environment, or personal factors. There is also no good evidence to show that an intervention that is effective at the body-specific level will result in an improvement at the activity level, or vice versa. Although such cross-over benefit might happen, not enough high-quality studies have been done to demonstrate it. However, a recent meta-analysis comparing different exercise interventions reported that resistance training was associated with improved gross motor function and gait speed, while mixed exercise programs were most effective for improving strength and walking performance.

Because cerebral palsy has "varying severity and complexity" across the lifespan, it can be considered a collection of conditions for management purposes. A multidisciplinary approach for cerebral palsy management is recommended, focusing on "maximising individual function, choice and independence" in line with the International Classification of Functioning, Disability and Health's goals. The team may include a paediatrician, a health visitor, a social worker, a physiotherapist, an orthotist, a speech and language therapist, an occupational therapist, a teacher specialising in helping children with visual impairment, an educational psychologist, an orthopaedic surgeon, a neurologist and a neurosurgeon.

Various forms of therapy are available to people living with cerebral palsy as well as caregivers and parents. Treatment may include one or more of the following: physical therapy; occupational therapy; speech therapy; water therapy; drugs to control seizures, alleviate pain, or relax muscle spasms (e.g. benzodiazepines); surgery to correct anatomical abnormalities or release tight muscles; braces and other orthotic devices; rolling walkers; and communication aids such as computers with attached voice synthesisers. A Cochrane review published in 2004 found a trend toward benefit of speech and language therapy for children with cerebral palsy, but noted the need for high quality research. A 2013 systematic review found that many of the therapies used to treat CP have no good evidence base; the treatments with the best evidence are medications (anticonvulsants, botulinum toxin, bisphosphonates, diazepam), therapy (bimanual training, casting, constraint-induced movement therapy, context-focused therapy, fitness training, goal-directed training, hip surveillance, home programmes, occupational therapy after botulinum toxin, pressure care) and surgery (selective dorsal rhizotomy).

== Lifestyle ==
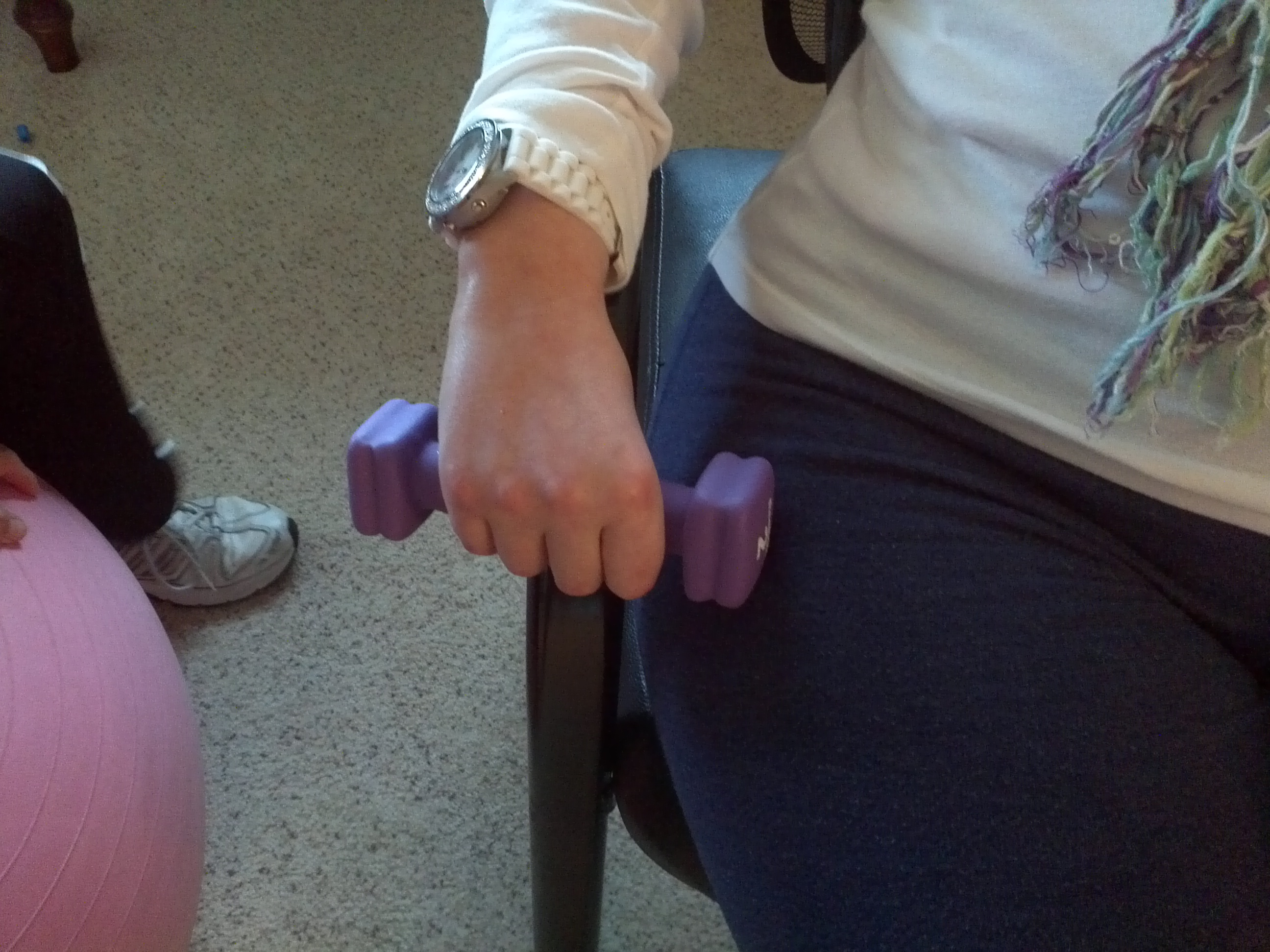
Physical therapy used to treat spastic hemiplegia

Physical activity is recommended for people with cerebral palsy, particularly in terms of cardiorespiratory endurance, muscle strengthening and reduction of sedentary behaviour. Participating in physical activity can supplement or replace some forms of therapy. It has been argued that people with cerebral palsy need to maintain a higher level of fitness than the general population to offset loss of functionality as they age. Access to exercise can often depend on the caregivers' perception of whether it will benefit the person with CP, or barriers in the community. Accommodations in the environment and context has been identified as important when sustaining exercise participation in adults with cerebral palsy. There has been increasing interest in maintaining muscle strength through the lifespan of a person with CP. Aerobic capacity is not routinely assessed in people with cerebral palsy in a rehabilitation context, but Wingate tests have been advocated for use. Behavioural change methods have been used to promote physical activity among young people with cerebral palsy, but there is no significant evidence for these working. It is difficult to sustain behavioural change in terms of increasing physical activity of children with CP. Even though exercise is commonly recommended, there is only a small amount of evidence saying that aerobic exercise is good for gross motor function in children. Exercise can increase wellness in those with cerebral palsy. With regards to sports, the amount of exercise advised should be unique to the demands of the sport in question, the effect of the individual's condition on performance, and the potential to cause worsening of the condition. It is recommended, to encourage integrating moderate to vigorous exercise, including the use of a motor-assisted elliptical trainer. This is thought to improve fitness and the functioning.

Function gait training in children and young adults with cerebral palsy improves their ability to walk. There is evidence that antigravity treadmill training may improve the gait and balance of those children with diplegic cerebral palsy, it may also reduce risk of falls in these children.

Hippo therapy, or therapeutic horseback riding, is a physical therapy treatment strategy that uses equine movement. Evidence suggests that those with CP can benefit from symmetry of trunk movement. It is common for horses to sway, so those on them constantly have to adjust their posture. The symmetric, rhythmic, and consistent input that horseback riding provides helps with postural improvement. During horseback riding, a locomotor impulse is sent up the back of the horse. This impulse is then interpreted by the riders body, and it allows for regulation of mediolateral and anteroposterior postural sway, adaptation to new environments, anticipatory and feedback postural control and better use of multi sensory posture and movement related inputs (Keon et al., 2011).

A normal vaccination schedule should be adhered to, as preventable diseases may take away energy that a person with CP would normally use in day-to-day life.

== Therapy ==
Physiotherapy (also known as physical therapy) programs are designed to encourage the patient to build a strength base for improved gait and volitional movement, together with stretching programs to limit contractures. Physiotherapists can teach parents how to position and handle their child for activities of daily living. The need for lifelong physiotherapy for muscle tone, bone structure and preventing joint dislocation has been debated in terms of the costs and benefits of such therapy. Children may find long-term physical therapy boring. Physiotherapy exercises are designed to improve balance, postural control, gait, and assist with mobility and transferring the person with CP, for example from a wheelchair to a bed.

Speech therapy helps control the muscles of the mouth and jaw, and helps improve communication. Just as CP can affect the way a person moves their arms and legs, it can also affect the way they move their mouth, face and head. This can make it hard for the person to breathe; talk clearly; and bite, chew and swallow food. Speech therapy often starts before a child begins school and continues throughout the school years.

Biofeedback is a therapy in which people learn how to control their affected muscles. Biofeedback therapy has been found to significantly improve gait in children with cerebral palsy. Mirror therapy has been used to improve hand function and was found to be "generally effective in enhancing muscle strength, motor speed, muscle activity, and the accuracy of both hands". Second-generation mirror therapy, which includes the use of robotics or virtual reality, has been developed since the 2000s, however the evidence supporting this is of low quality.

Massage therapy is designed to help relax tense muscles, strengthen muscles, and keep joints flexible.

Gait analysis is often used to describe gait abnormalities in children. Gait training has been shown to improve walking speed in children and young adults with cerebral palsy.

Occupational therapy helps adults and children maximise their function, adapt to their limitations and live as independently as possible. A family-centred philosophy is used with children who have CP. Occupational therapists work closely with families in order to address their concerns and priorities for their child. Family-centered care is a paradigm that is often used with families with a child with CP. A review of how parents facilitate their child's participation found that parents typically "enable and support performance of meaningful activities" and "enable, change and use the environment", but that there is little written on parents' needs.

CP commonly causes hemiplegia. Those with hemiplegia have limited use of the limbs on one side of the body, and have normal use of the limbs on the other side. People with hemiplegia often adapt by ignoring the limited limbs, and performing nearly all activities with the unaffected limbs, which can lead to increased problems with muscle tone, motor control and range of motion. An emerging technique called constraint-induced movement therapy (CIMT) is designed to address this. In CIMT, the unaffected limbs are constrained, forcing the individual to learn to use the affected limbs. CIMT promotes increased motor function due to structural plasticity in the brain. As of 2007 there was limited, preliminary evidence that CIMT is effective, but more study is needed before it can be recommended with confidence. CIMT, modified CIMT, and forced use are three movement therapies that have been examined. CIMT is defined as "restraint of the unaffected upper limb ..., with more than three hours of therapy per day ... and is provided for at least two consecutive weeks". Children with hemiplegic cerebral palsy often have sensory impairments as well as motor deficits. CIMT has been shown to be an effective OT intervention to improve proprioception and sensory processing. CIMT has also been found to improve postural symmetry during functional tasks in individuals with CP.

Modified CIMT (mCIMT) is defined as "restraint of the unaffected upper limb and less than three hours per day of therapy provided to the affected limb". Forced use is when "restraint of the unaffected upper limb is applied but no additional treatment of the affected upper limb is provided". A review concluded that there is a positive trend favoring all three aforementioned therapies.

A comparison of bimanual training (BIT) and CIMT found that there was no significant difference between the two in terms of effects. However, bimanual training may be more able to be integrated into a child's daily life, because the goals in bimanual training are more functional. CIMT has some advantages, such as therapists being able to solely focus on the affected arm, and the child having no choice but to use the affected arm in their activities of daily life as their unaffected arm is constrained. In bimanual training, the child may continue to use the unaffected arm to compensate if their therapist or parent does not remind them to use both hands.

However, there is only some benefit from therapy. Treatment is usually symptomatic and focuses on helping the person to develop as many motor skills as possible or to learn how to compensate for the lack of them. Nonspeaking people with CP are often successful availing themselves of augmentative and alternative communication (AAC).

Therapeutic tests for assessing balance do not appear to have good evidence for their reliability and responsiveness. The tests with the strongest evidence are the Trunk Control Measurement Scale and the Level of Sitting Scale (when measuring the ability to maintain balance), Timed Up and Go test (when measuring the ability to achieve balance), and the Segmental Assessment of Trunk Control (when restoring balance).

Certain countries practice intensive physical therapy, but obtaining reliable data on its medium and long-term effectiveness is challenging.

== Assistive technology ==
Assistive technology is commonly used to promote the independence of people with disabilities. Commonly used technologies for people with cerebral palsy can include patient lifts, electric wheelchairs, orthotics, seating systems, mealtime aids (such as large-handled cutlery and slip-resistant mats), mobility aids, standing frames, non-motorised wheelchairs, augmentative and alternative communication and speech-generating devices. Scope has identified 3D printing as an area of promise in being able to print customised orthotics on-demand.

Orthotic devices such as ankle-foot orthoses (AFOs) are often prescribed to achieve the following objectives: correct and/or prevent deformity, provide a base of support, facilitate training in skills, and improve the efficiency of gait. The available evidence suggests that orthoses can have positive effects on all temporal and spatial parameters of gait, i.e. velocity, cadence, step length, stride length, single and double support. AFOs have also been found to reduce energy expenditure. Often children with CP require orthoses, such as casts and splints, to correct or prevent joint abnormalities, stabilize joints, prevent unwanted movement, allow desired movement, and prevent permanent muscle shortening. Orthoses may also make it easier to dress or to maintain hygiene. Lower limb splinting is specifically beneficial in providing a base of support and facilitating walking. It is equally important that the child be able to carry out daily activities and prevent joint deformities.

Children with CP have difficulties with mobility and posture. Occupational therapists often assess and prescribe seating equipment and wheelchairs. An appropriate wheelchair will stabilize the body so the child can use their arms for other activities. Wheelchairs therefore enhance independence.

Accessible housing may assist some people with cerebral palsy, particularly wheelchair users.

Assistive technologies used during sleep to position the body to prevent painful hip migration are called 'sleep positioning systems'. Studies on their effectiveness are of poor quality.

== Medication ==
Various oral and injectable medication have been used to treat cerebral palsy and its associated comorbid conditions. They include botulinum toxin, benzodiazepines, baclofen, dantrolene, tizanidine, cyclobenzaprine, and phenol.

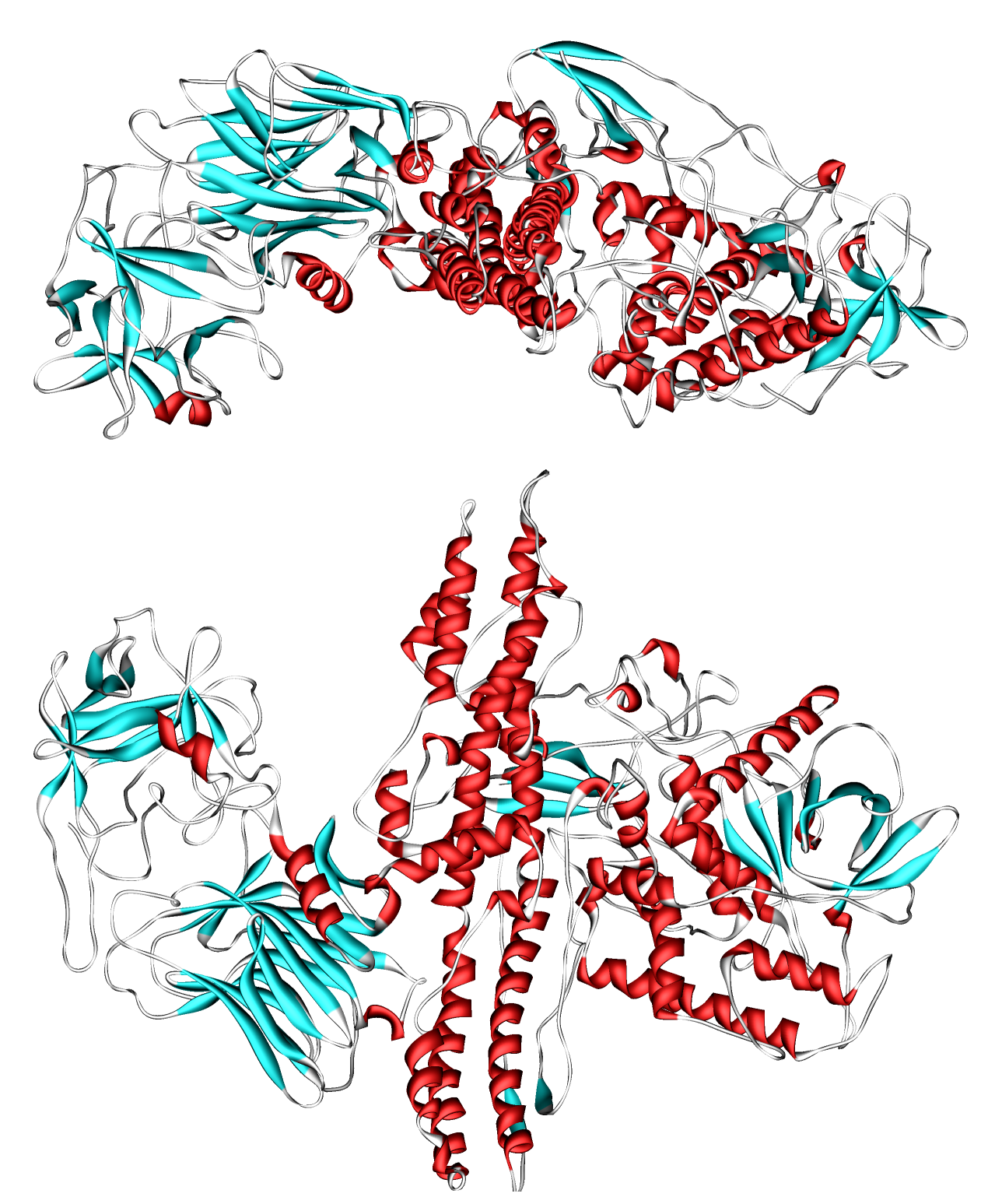
alt=Cartoon representation of Botulinum toxin. PDB entry 3BTA

Botulinum toxin injections are given into muscles that are spastic or sometimes dystonic, the aim being to reduce the muscle hypertonus that can be painful. A reduction in muscle tone can also facilitate bracing and the use of orthotics. Both lower extremity and upper extremity muscles are injected. Botulinum toxin is focal treatment, meaning that a limited number of muscles can be injected at the same time. The effect of the toxin is reversible and a reinjection may be needed every 4–6 months. In children it decreases spasticity and improve range of motion and thus has become commonly used. Botulin toxin has been used in CP treatment for around two decades and can be recommended for children above the age of two. Two systematic reviews published in 2010 and 2020 found that there is high level evidence in the use of botulinum toxin as an add on therapy to occupational therapy among other physical therapies modalities in order to manage spasticity in the arms of children with cerebral palsy. However, there is no strong research associated with the use of botulinum toxin in the management of spasticity in the legs or improving gait compared to casting. More evidence related to the frequency and dosage of injections as it relates to long-term outcomes is needed in order to support or refute the use of botulinum toxin in the management of lower limb spasticity in children with cerebral palsy. Dosages of botulinum toxin have been based on expert opinion rather than evidence-based practices. The dosages recommended have recently been reduced to reduce severe side-effects including becoming sensitive to the botulin toxin and developing an allergic response. Higher risks have been noted with children who are at level IV and V on the GMFCS.

Drooling is often treated with botulinum toxin A, benztropine or anticholinergics (e.g. glycopyrrolate). A review on the treatment of sialorrhea in children with cerebral palsy found that it was not possible to tell whether these interventions worked or were safe. Anticholinergics may contribute to constipation.

Bisphosphonates are used to treat osteoporosis in adults. Osteoporosis is common in children with cerebral palsy, and non-oral bisphosphonates have been used to treat children with a very low bone mass density and a medical history of fragility fracture.

Oral baclofen or diazepam is used to reduce spasticity which results in pain, muscle spasms or functional disability. Baclofen is used for a long-term effect and works at the spinal level. Diazepam is fast-acting. Baclofen may also be administered intrathecally.

Trihexyphenidyl is often prescribed for dystonia. However, a 2018 Cochrane review (one study met inclusion criteria) on the use of trihexyphenidyl for dystonia found insufficient evidence of its effectiveness.

Sometimes, medication used to manage physical aspects of CP can have effects on the person's mental health, or medications used to manage mental health can affect motor function.

Epilepsy that co-occurs with cerebral palsy is often drug-resistant.

== Orthopaedic surgery ==
Deformities in cerebral palsy children are inherently known for being Multiplane i.e. occurring in more than one plane such as transverse plane through which rotation occurs and sagittal plane through which flexion/extension of joint occurs. Furthermore, deformities in cerebral palsy children are characteristically multilevel i.e. occurring at simultaneously at more than one joint. This adds to the complexity of orthopedic management of cerebral palsy children. Thus, multilevel orthopedic surgery is the mainstay of orthopedic management. Multilevel orthopedic surgery may include soft tissue as tendon lengthening or transfer and/or bony surgery as corrective bone osteotomies. Multilevel orthopedic surgery is usually performed in one anesthetic sitting. This allows for the institution of one postoperative rehabilitation protocol and reduces hospital admission rates. Orthopaedic surgery is widely used to correct fixed deformities and improve the functional capacity and gait pattern of children with CP. Dynamic deformities such as ankle equinus and hip adduction deformity leading to subluxation are usually managed conservatively with exercises; serial casting and botulinum toxin type A injections. This main goal of these conservative measures is to impede or prevent the happening of fixed or static joint deformities. Once joint contractures- fixed deformities - develop or joint subluxation or dislocation occurs, surgical treatment could become mandatory. It is of paramount importance to delay the age at which orthopaedic surgical intervention becomes necessary as surgery early in life carries a greater risk of deformity recurrence especially in cases of ankle equines. Additionally, unjustified lengthening of the tendon Achilles is fraught with risk of over lengthening and subsequent gait deterioration namely crouch gait. In general, orthopaedic surgery for children with CP consists of tendon releases, lengthening, transposition and corrective osteotomies. For example, fixed/static ankle equinus is usually managed by gastrocnemius-soleus aponeurotic lengthening or tendon Achilles lengthening. Hip subluxation/dislocation is usually managed by adductor musculature release with or without a psoas tendon release together with femoral and pelvic osteotomies. This aims at hip joint containment and preservation. In the event that hip joint dislocation becomes longstanding and painful in elder children or adolescence, hip salvage surgery may be an option to reduce pain help nursing and improve sitting balance. A variety of surgical procedures are included under hip salvage namely valgization osteotomy and femoral head resection. Total hip arthroplasty is recommended for those with a mature skeleton, who are also likely less severely impaired. Because CP is widely heterogeneous in its presentation, surgery should be considered on a case-by-case basis.

Orthopaedic surgery usually involves one or a combination of:

- Orthopaedic surgery as mentioned above involves releasing tight muscles and fixed joint contractures, and corrective osteotomies conducted basically to restore sagittal and rotational malalignment of bones. Orthopedic surgery is most often performed on the hips, knees, hamstrings, and ankles. For example, hip adductor release, musculotendinous lengthening for equinus gait, femoral derotational osteotomy, and knee extension osteotomy are commonly practiced. Less commonly, this surgery may be used for people with stiffness of their elbows, wrists, hands, and fingers.

== Other surgeries ==
- The insertion of a baclofen pump usually during the stages while a person is a young adult. This is usually placed in the left abdomen. It is a pump that is connected to the spinal cord, whereby it releases doses of baclofen to alleviate continuous muscle flexion. Baclofen is a muscle relaxant and is often given by mouth to people to help counter the effects of spasticity, although this has the side effect of sedating the individual. The pump can be adjusted if muscle tone is worse at certain times of the day or night. The baclofen pump is most appropriate for individuals with chronic, severe stiffness or uncontrolled muscle movement throughout the body. There is a small amount of evidence that baclofen pumps are effective in the short term.
- Cutting nerves on the limbs most affected by movements and spasms. This procedure, called a rhizotomy ("rhizo" meaning root and "tomy" meaning "a cutting of" from the Greek suffix tomia), reduces spasms and allows more flexibility and control of the affected limbs and joints.
- Tracheotomy
- Dental surgery
- Diagnostic endoscopy
- Nissen fundoplication

Other surgical procedures are available to try to help with other problems. Those who have serious difficulties with eating may undergo a procedure called a gastrostomy: a hole is cut through the belly skin and into the stomach to allow for a feeding tube. There is no good evidence about the effectiveness or safety of gastrostomy. Gastrostomies are associated with a lower life expectancy, this is probably due to underlying problems with swallowing rather than the procedure itself.

== Others ==
Whole-body vibration might improve speed, gross motor function and femur bone density in children with cerebral palsy.

Aquatic therapy or hydrotherapy are commonly used therapies for children with CP, but evidence for their effectiveness is mixed. Potential benefits of aquatic therapy is that children might find it more interesting than exercising on land, and they can try different kinds of movement such as jumping or skipping with less impact on their joints. Due to the principles of water, buoyancy allows for optimal joint positioning, which enables the execution of these activities as well as walking exercises for children with CP experiencing mild mobility constraint. Buoyancy enables children with moderate to severe mobility impairments to maneuver and exercise in water more freely than they can on land. While aquatic exercise is feasible and has low risk of adverse effects, the dose required to make a difference to gross motor skills is unclear. Research suggests that the dose required may vary depending on age. A systematic review investigating the effects of aquatic therapy showed that children around 9–10 years old showed significant improvements in gross motor function, whereas older children did not. Although still unclear, these findings suggest that older children may require longer aquatic therapy interventions in order to improve their skills and prevent decline.

Hip surveillance is the term for monitoring a child with CP who is at risk of hip dislocation to try to prevent dislocation from happening. The modern definition of cerebral palsy includes secondary skeletal effects on the child. The Gross Motor Function Classification System is a good indicator of hip issues, and more commonly occurs in children with spastic tetraplegia or spastic quadriplegia, but it is difficult to tell what type of CP a child has at the age where hip displacement might first become an issue (sometimes at 2 years old, but more commonly between 3 and 4 years old). Children are assessed for the risk of hip displacement using radiography.

Music therapy has been used in CP to motivate or relax children, or used as auditory feedback. Playing percussion instruments has been used as part of groupwork in therapy. Piano lessons may be beneficial in CP rehabilitation, however more research is needed.

While there is great interest in using video game rehabilitation with children with cerebral palsy, it is difficult to compare outcomes between studies, and therefore to reach evidence-based conclusions on its effectiveness. Because video gaming is popular, it may help children's motivation to continue with the therapy. There is moderate evidence for improvements with balance and motor skills in children and teens, but it is not recommended as an effective therapy.

Service dogs may be used to assist people who have seizures as part of their CP.

Yoga has been used by carers as part of the physical therapies for children to assist in developing basic motor skills.

There is evidence around using multi-modal and physical interventions to improve general cognitive functioning in people with CP.

== Alternative therapy ==
There has not been much research into the use of alternative medicine to treat cerebral palsy. Acupuncture has been used as a treatment for cerebral palsy since at least the 1980s, but as of 2009, there have been no Cochrane reviews of the effectiveness of acupuncture in the management of cerebral palsy. In Traditional Chinese Medicine, cerebral palsy is often covered in the traditional diagnosis of "5 delayed syndrome". Dolphin-assisted therapy, Adeli suits, and hyperbaric oxygen therapy have been criticised as being alternative medicine and contrary to the practice of evidence-based medicine.

Hyperbaric oxygen therapy (HBOT), in which pressurised oxygen is inhaled inside a hyperbaric chamber, has been studied under the theory that improving oxygen availability to damaged brain cells can reactivate some of them to function normally. HBOT results in no significant difference from that of pressurised room air, however, and some children undergoing HBOT may experience adverse events such as seizures and the need for ear pressure equalisation tubes.

Patterning is a controversial form of alternative therapy for people with CP. The method is promoted by The Institutes for the Achievement of Human Potential (IAHP), a Philadelphia nonprofit organisation, but has been criticised by the American Academy of Pediatrics.

Conductive education (CE) was developed in Hungary from 1945 based on the work of András Pető. It is a unified system of rehabilitation for people with neurological disorders including cerebral palsy, Parkinson's disease and multiple sclerosis, amongst other conditions. It is theorised to improve mobility, self-esteem, stamina and independence as well as daily living skills and social skills. The conductor is the professional who delivers CE in partnership with parents and children. Skills learned during CE should be applied to everyday life and can help to develop age-appropriate cognitive, social and emotional skills. It is available at specialised centres.

Reviews disagree on the usefulness of therapy with horses – one found there was a positive effect on large scale motor function and another found that there was no evidence of improvements.

Occupational therapists may use neuro-developmental techniques to promote normal movement and posture and to inhibit abnormal movement and posture. Specific techniques include joint compression and stretching to provide sensory-motor input and to guide motor output. Neurodevelopmental treatment, despite being commonly used as a therapy for children with CP, has not been found to have strong evidence for its use. It has been suggested that rhythmic auditory stimulation may be more effective in improving gait than NDT techniques.

== Occupational therapy ==
Occupational Therapy (OT) enables individuals with cerebral palsy to participate in activities of daily living that are meaningful to them. A family-centred philosophy is used with children who have CP. Occupational therapists work closely with families in order to address their concerns and priorities for their child. Occupational therapists may address issues relating to sensory, cognitive, or motor impairments resulting from CP that affect the child's participation in self-care, productivity, or leisure. Parent counselling is also an important aspect of occupational therapy treatment with regard to optimizing the parent's skills in caring for and playing with their child to support improvement of their child's abilities to do things. The occupational therapist typically assesses the child to identify abilities and difficulties, and environmental conditions, such as physical and cultural influences, that affect participation in daily activities. Occupational therapists may also recommend changes to the play space, changes to the structure of the room or building, and seating and positioning techniques to allow the child to play and learn effectively.

=== Effect of sensory and perceptual impairments ===
Children with CP may experience decreased sensation or a limited understanding of how the brain interprets what it sees. Occupational therapists may plan and implement sensory-perceptual-motor (SPM) training for children with CP who have sensory impairments so that they learn to take in, understand, plan and produce organized behaviour. The SPM training improves the daily, functional abilities of people with CP. Occupational therapists may also use verbal instructions and supplementary visual input, such as visual cues, to help children with CP learn and carry out activities.

For children with CP with limited movement and sensation, the risk of pressure sores increases. Pressure sores often occur on bony parts of the body. For example, pressure sores may occur when a child has limited feeling and movement of their lower body and uses a wheelchair; the tailbone bears weight when seated and can become vulnerable to pressure sores. The occupational therapist can educate the child, family, and caregivers about how to prevent pressure sores by monitoring the skin for areas of irritation, changing positions frequently, or using a tilt-in-space wheelchair.

=== Effect of cognitive and perceptual impairments ===
OT can address cognitive and perceptual disabilities, especially of the visual-motor area. For children with CP who have difficulty remembering the order and organization of self-care tasks in the morning, an occupational therapist can construct a morning routine schedule with reminders. An occupational therapist may analyze the steps involved in a task to break down an activity into simpler tasks. For example, dressing can be broken down into smaller, manageable steps. This can be done by having a caregiver lay out the clothing in order so the child knows what needs to be put on first.

=== Effect of motor impairments ===
The effect of motor impairments is significant for children with CP because it affects the ability to walk, propel a wheelchair, maintain hygiene, access the community and interact with other people. Occupational therapists address motor impairments in a variety of ways and makes use of various techniques, depending on the child's needs and goals. The occupational therapist may help the child with gross motor rehabilitation, or whole body and limb movements, through repetitive activities. If the child has muscle weakness, progressive resistance exercises can improve muscular strength and endurance. Fine motor rehabilitation, or small, specific movements, such as threading the eye of a needle, can be implemented to improve finger movement and control.

For children with difficulties speaking, an occupational therapist may liaise with a speech therapist, carry out assessments, provide education and prescribe adaptive equipment. Adaptive equipment may include picture boards to help with communication and computers that respond to voice.

Occupational therapists can help the child promote use of a neglected arm through techniques such as constraint-induced movement therapy (CIMT), which forces use of the unused arm by placing the other arm in a sling, cast or oversized mitt.

Another OT technique that may be used is neuromuscular facilitation techniques, which involves physically moving and stretching the muscles to improve function so that the child can participate in activities.

Spasticity is a common problem experienced by people with cerebral palsy. It can cause pain and loss of sleep, impair function in activities of daily living, and cause unnecessary complications. Spasticity is measured with the Ashworth scale. Occupational therapy targeting spasticity aims to lengthen the overactive muscles. Some people with cerebral palsy use spasticity to compensate for muscle weakness, and so reducing spasticity can reduce function.

=== OT role with factors influencing participation ===
Barriers to participation for children with CP include difficulty accessing the community. This includes difficulty accessing buildings and using transportation. Occupational therapists may work with developers to ensure new homes are accessible to all people. Also, occupational therapists often help people apply for government and non-profit funding to provide assistive devices, such as special computer programs or wheelchairs, to children with CP. Availability of transportation services can be limited for children with CP because of many factors, such as difficulties fitting wheelchairs into vehicles and dependency on public transit schedules. Therefore, the occupational therapists may also be involved in education and referral regarding accessible vehicles and funding.

Occupational therapists address the community and environmental factors that affect participation in leisure activities by educating children with CP, their families, and others on available options and adaptive ways to engage in leisure activities of interest. Prejudice of others toward disability can also be a barrier to participation for children with CP with respect to leisure activities. One way occupational therapists can address this barrier is to teach the child to educate others on CP – thus reducing stigma and enhancing participation. Finally, occupational therapists take children's preferences into consideration in terms of cosmetic appearance when prescribing or fabricating adaptive equipment and splints. This is important as appearance may affect the child's compliance with assistive devices, as well as their self-confidence, which may impact participation. In addition to providing dedicated occupational therapy to such children, some non-profit organizations viz. Spastic Society of Gurgaon are providing comprehensive assistance which includes designing of child specific assisting devices to such children for making their lives more meaningful by enabling them to be self-reliant to the best possible extent.

== Research ==
Most research into cerebral palsy covers children and adolescents. Stem cell therapy, and other cell-based therapies are being studied as a treatment. A potential treatment for some forms of cerebral palsy may be deep brain stimulation.As of 2016 it is thought that research in genetics and genomics, teratology, and developmental neuroscience is going to yield greater understanding of cerebral palsy. Genetic testing may help find the etiology or comorbidities for types of cerebral palsy which could help in clarifying the classification systems for cerebral palsy. In addition, experimenting with combinations of therapies may result in additional benefits. A 2016 review which looked at research gaps in cerebral palsy identified neuroplasticity as an "underresearched opportunity for treating CP".

== Defining functional independence ==
Despite the transition in philosophy from treating individual body problems to treating the person with CP holistically, it has remained difficult to define what functional independence is. The Functional Independence Measure is sometimes used to describe people with CP.

== See also ==
- Autism therapies
- Disease management (health)
- Management of depression
- Neuropsychiatry
- Neurorehabilitation
- Salutogenesis
- Quality of life (healthcare)
