= Gary Kielhofner =

Occupational therapy theorist

Gary Wayne Kielhofner (February 15, 1949 – September 2, 2010) was an American social scientist and influential occupational therapy theorist who rose to prominence as a scholar during his time as Professor and Wade-Meyer Chair of the Department of Occupational Therapy at the University of Illinois at Chicago. He is best known for his conceptual practice model, which is known globally as The Model of Human Occupation (MOHO). The model was first published as a series of articles in The American Journal of Occupational Therapy by Kielhofner and others but later extensively developed over Kielhofner's career and disseminated in numerous books and articles. Kielhofner lectured widely and consulted regularly in the United States and abroad, particularly throughout Scandinavia, the United Kingdom, (including Scotland), Ireland, Italy, France, Germany, Spain, Portugal, Japan, Hong Kong, Israel, and Central and South America. An active network of proponents across the international occupational therapy community continues to study and evolve his model through the MOHO Clearinghouse maintained at the University of Illinois at Chicago (UIC).

Kielhofner's main theoretical contribution was his idea that a complete understanding of the complex manner through which human occupation is initiated, pursued and completed necessarily requires systems approaches that rely upon research in the biological, psychological and social sciences. He was among the first theorists in his field to use general systems theory and later dynamical systems theory to describe the complexities of his model, which described the iterative, interactive relationships between a person's volition, habituation (roles and habits), performance capacity, and the social and physical environment. He was also the first theorist to clearly explain the importance and relevance of the temporal dimension to occupational therapy practice. Kielhofner's work is widely cited and his model stands among the most influential theoretical contributions in the history of occupational therapy.

== Personal life and education ==
Gary Wayne Kiehofner was born in Cape Girardeau, Missouri on February 15, 1949 and lived in rural SE Missouri (Oran) during his boyhood. His early schooling was in nearby Chaffee, Missouri at St. Ambrose School in the Catholic parish of the same name. As a conscientious objector during the Vietnam War, he attended seminary before studying psychology and occupational therapy at St. Louis University. Profoundly influenced by an early experience as a very young child helping his Grandmother following a severe car accident, he decided to continue study in occupational therapy at the University of Southern California (USC), where he quickly became interested in the theoretical foundations of the profession. During his time as a graduate student at USC, he worked on a theoretical model to better understand human agency and its consequences and influences from a health perspective, publishing four articles that articulated his theory. These articles attempted to draw from and apply leading ideas from the social sciences into a complex understanding of humans as beings with an intrinsic need to act competently and meaningfully on their environments. Upon graduation from USC with a Master of Arts degree in Occupational Therapy, Kielhofner decided to begin advanced study in public health, later earning the Dr.P.H. (Doctor of Public Health) degree from the University of California at Los Angeles (UCLA).

== Career ==
Upon graduation from UCLA, Kielhofner accepted an appointment at Boston University, soon thereafter to accept a position at Virginia Commonwealth University (VCU). While at VCU, he began earnestly to further develop and explain his Model of Human Occupation, which was then starting to gain attention in the profession of occupational therapy. In 1988 he accepted an appointment as Professor, Wade-Meyer Chair, and Head at the University of Illinois at Chicago, (UIC) where he remained until his death in 2010. At UIC, Kielhofner continued the development of his theory, publishing numerous articles that explicated various components of the model. He enjoyed mentoring and was influential in launching the successful careers of many students who have contributed their own scholarship in the social sciences. As recognition of his model grew, he accepted invitations to lecture and teach at several international locations where his work was influential in guiding practice, most notably in Stockholm, Sweden at the Karolinska Institute and at Queen Margaret University in Edinburgh, Scotland. He established the Center for Outcomes Research and Education at UIC under a grant from the American Occupational Therapy Foundation, which later inducted him into its Academy of Research. Shortly before his death, he began an international symposium that continues and started a clearinghouse of articles and publications at the University of Illinois at Chicago. In recognition of his work, Kielhofner received honorary doctorates from the University of the Sciences in Philadelphia, Pennsylvania; Queen Margaret University in Scotland, and the University of Linköping, Sweden. In 2017, during occupational therapy's centennial, Kielhofner was honored through his listing among 100 influential occupational therapists in occupational therapy's history by the American Occupational Therapy Association.

== Major publications ==
- Kielhofner, G. (1983). Health through Occupation. Theory and practice in occupational therapy. Philadelphia, F. A. Davis.
- Kielhofner, G. (2002) A Model of Human Occupation: Theory and Application.(3rd Ed). Baltimore: Lippincott, Williams and Wilkins.
- Kielhofner, G. (2009). Conceptual foundations of occupational therapy practice (4th Ed). Philadelphia, F.A. Davis.
- Kielhofner, G. (2006). Research in Occupational Therapy. ISBN 978-0-8036-1525-0
