= American Occupational Therapy Association =

American professional association

- Abbreviation: AOTA
- Founded: October 19, 1917; 108 years ago
- Type: Professional association
- Tax ID no.: 13-1526422
- Legal status: 501(c)(6)
- Executive director: Sherry Keramidas
- Subsidiaries: The Fund to Promote Awareness of Occupational Therapy (501(c)(3)); American Occupational Therapy Association Political Action Committee (527)
- Revenue: $21,469,960 (2019)
- Expenses: $19,272,678 (2019)
- Endowment: $286,293 (2019)
- Employees: 85 (2018)
- Volunteers: 800 (2018)
- Website: www.aota.org
- Formerly called: National Society for the Promotion of Occupational Therapy

The American Occupational Therapy Association (AOTA) is the national professional association established in 1917 to represent the interests and concerns of occupational therapy practitioners and students and improve the quality of occupational therapy services.

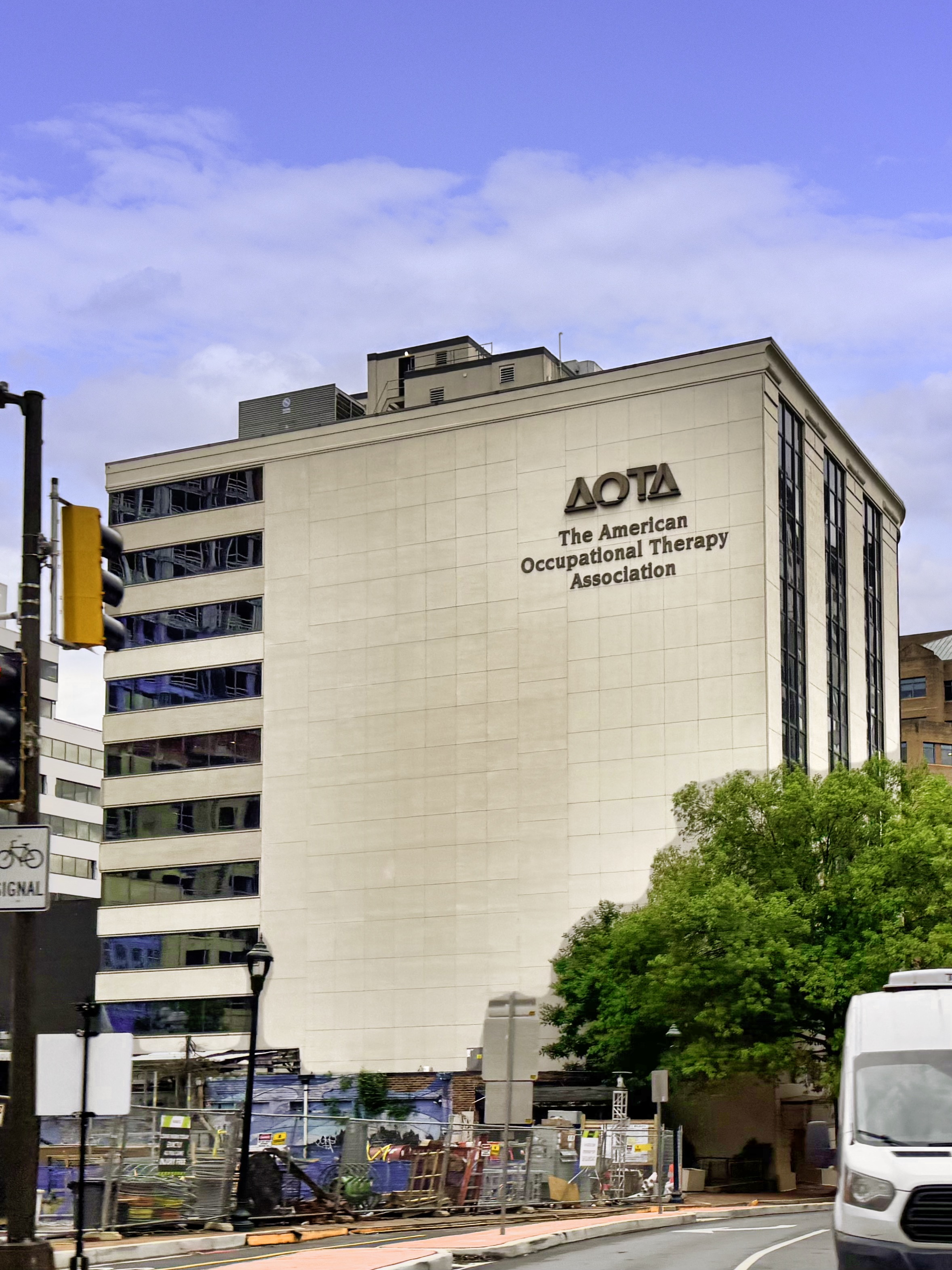
The American Occupational Therapy Association building in Bethesda, Maryland

The National Society for the Promotion of Occupational Therapy was the founding name of the AOTA. Occupational therapy was launched as a new profession at the first meeting of the National Society for the Promotion of Occupational Therapy at Consolation House, Clifton Springs, New York in March 1917.

The society was founded by a small group of people from diverse backgrounds. There was George Edward Barton (1871–1923) an architect, William Rush Dunton (1865–1966) a psychiatrist, Eleanor Clarke Slagle (1870–1942) a social worker and occupational therapist, Thomas B Kidner (1866–1932) a vocational educator, Susan Cox Johnson (1875–1932) an arts and crafts teacher, Susan E. Tracy (1864–1928) a nurse, Herbert James Hall (1870–1923) a physician and Isabel Gladwin Newton Barton (1891–1975) the secretary and author. Their wide ranging interests, including moral treatment, pragmatism, habit training, mental hygiene movement, curative occupations and the arts and craft movement, laid the foundations for occupational therapy. The founders' vision was the 'advancement of occupation as a therapeutic measure; for the study of the effect of occupation upon the human being; and for the scientific dispensation of this knowledge'.^{:45-46}

Herbert Hall suggested changing the name of the society. This was discussed at the fourth annual meeting in 1920 when Eleanor Clarke Slagle, the president of the society questioned the need for the descriptive phase ‘for the promotion of occupational therapy’. The shorter name of the ‘American Occupational Therapy Association’ was accepted as part of an amended constitution at the annual meeting in October 1921.^{:93}

In 1952, the American Association was one of ten founder members of the World Federation of Occupational Therapists (WFOT). The other associations were from the Australia, Canada, Denmark, India, Israel, New Zealand, South Africa, Sweden and United Kingdom (England and Scotland).

AOTA designated April as Occupational Therapy Month.

== See also ==
- American Journal of Occupational Therapy published by AOTA since 1947
- Anna Jean Ayres (1920–1989), a developmental psychologist known for her work in the area of sensory processing disorder
- American Occupational Therapy Foundation, a charitable, scientific and educational non-profit organization dedicated to the advancement of occupational therapy and increased public understanding
