= American Journal of Occupational Therapy =

- Discipline: Occupational therapy
- Language: English
- Edited by: Stacey Reynolds

Publication details
- History: 1947–present
- Publisher: American Occupational Therapy Association (United States)
- Frequency: Bimonthly
- Impact factor: 2.231 (2019)

Standard abbreviations
- ISO 4: Am. J. Occup. Ther.

Indexing
- CODEN: AJOTAM
- ISSN: 0272-9490 (print); 1943-7676 (web)
- LCCN: 52033090
- OCLC no.: 767965766

Links
- Journal homepage; Online access

The American Journal of Occupational Therapy is a bimonthly peer-reviewed medical journal that is published by the American Occupational Therapy Association. It covers research practice and health care issues in the field of occupational therapy.

== Abstracting and indexing ==
The journal is abstracted and indexed in Index Medicus/MEDLINE/PubMed, CINAHL, PsycINFO, Social Sciences Citation Index, and Current Contents/Social & Behavioral Sciences. According to the Journal Citation Reports, the journal has a 2019 2-year impact factor of 2.246 and a 5-year impact factor of 3.776.

== Past Editors-In-Chief ==
Past AJOT Editors-In-Chief
Editor	Years served
Elaine Viseltear	1974-1997
Betty Hasselkus	1998-2002
Mary Corcoran	2003-2007
Sharon Gutman	2008-2014
Lorie Gage Richards	2015-2020
Stacey Reynolds	2020–present
