= William Rush Dunton =

American psychiatrist and quilter (1868–1966)

William Rush Dunton Jr (24 July 1868 – 23 December 1966) was a founder and early president of the American Occupational Therapy Association. He is also recognized for his collection of, and scholarship about, American quilts.

== Early life ==
William Rush Dunton was born in 1868 in Chestnut Hill, Pennsylvania to Jacob and Annie Gordon Gemmill Dunton. He was named for his uncle, a prominent Philadelphia physician. Dunton received his early education at Germantown Academy and in 1889 received his B.A. and M.A. from Haverford College. In 1893, he graduated from University of Pennsylvania Medical School. He trained at a variety of hospitals in Philadelphia and spent six weeks training with Howard Atwood Kelly at Johns Hopkins Hospital.

== Professional life ==
In 1901, Dunton was appointed clinical assistant in the department of Clinical Neurology and in 1903 became an assistant professor in psychiatry at the Johns Hopkins School of Medicine. He retained his faculty position until 1942. He also became the assistant physician at Sheppard Asylum now known as Sheppard and Enoch Pratt Hospital but left in 1924 to become the medical director of Harlem Lodge (The Richard Gundry Home) until 1939. From 1940-1942, Dunton worked at The Laurel Sanatorium. Dunton was interested in the potential of healing his patients through purposeful activities (known then as daily occupations). In 1917, he was one of several individuals who believed in the healing properties of engaging activity and was instrumental in founding the National Society for the Promotion of Occupational Therapy that has since been renamed the American Occupational Therapy Association. His 1918 article "The Principles of Occupational Therapy" appeared in Public Health and laid the foundation for the textbook he published in 1919 entitled Reconstruction Therapy. In 1928, he published another textbook Prescribing Occupational Therapy. Dunton was among the founding members of the Maryland Psychiatric Society and served as the first secretary of the organization. He was also a charter member of Baltimore County Medical Association, the editor and regular contributor to the "Maryland Psychiatric Quarterly", assistant editor of the American Journal of Psychiatry, and the editor of Archives of Occupational Therapy later known as Occupational Therapy and Rehabilitation and today published as the American Journal of Occupational Therapy. He wrote on a variety of subjects including recreational therapy, epilepsy, mental health, quilting, and hooked rugs. In 1958, Dunton was honored by the American Occupational Therapy Association with the merit award for contributions to understanding the benefits of occupational therapy for mentally ill patients.

== Quilting ==
As part of his occupational therapy treatment, Dunton encouraged some of his patients to pursue quilt making. He felt that bright colors were pleasing to nervous patients, and the act of cutting and sewing helped take their minds off their own problems. Furthermore, he believed that many of his female patients could benefit from the quiet, calming influence of needlework and the sense of accomplishment it brought. This method of treatment led to a personal passion for quilting and quilt collecting. His collecting focused on album quilts from the Baltimore area. Dunton organized four exhibits, three of which took place at the Baltimore Museum of Art. His first show in 1916 highlighted fifty quilts for further study. Six of the quilts were made by Marie Webster whose book Quilts: Their Story and How to Make Them piqued Dunton’s interest in this hobby. He was the author of Old Quilts self-published in 1946 at a loss of $3,000, which is now a collector's item found priced between $300 and $400. Of the 2,000 copies he printed, Dunton hand-numbered each page of each volume. More than any other quilt historian, Dunton is responsible for his groundbreaking research on the Baltimore album quilt. In 1979, Dunton was inducted into the Quilters Hall of Fame. The Baltimore Appliqué Society, founded in 1993, raised $5,600 in 1997 to preserve Dunton’s papers and ensure their availability to researchers at the Baltimore Museum of Art.
