= Eleanor Clarke Slagle =

American occupational therapist

Eleanor Clarke Slagle (October 13, 1870–September 18, 1942) was an American social worker and an early pioneer of occupational therapy.

== Early life ==
Born in Hobart, New York, she was the only daughter of William John Clark and Emeline (Emmaline) J. (née Davenport) Clark. During her youth she went by the name Ella May Clark. Her father fought as an officer in the American Civil War and may have been left partially disabled by a neck wound. In 1894, she married Robert E. Slagle.

== Career ==
There is little record of what follows, up until she began studying at the UC Chicago School for Civics and Philanthropy in 1911. Thereafter she was employed in state hospitals of Michigan and New York. It was while visiting at the Kankakee State Hospital in Illinois that she became inspired to work in occupational therapy. In 1912, she became director of a department of occupational therapy at the Phipps Clinic under the direction of Dr. Adolf Meyer. In 1914 she resigned and returned to Chicago, where she gave lectures at the Chicago School for Civics and Philanthropy. Slagle established a workroom for handicapped people at Hull House. In 1917, she became general superintendent of occupational therapy for all of the Illinois state hospitals. The same year the training school she started was named the Henry B. Favill School of Occupations which continued until 1920.

Until March 1917, occupational therapy was not organized as a profession. This changed with the formation of the National Society for the Promotion of Occupational Therapy (NSPOT) that year, for which she was a founding member. During the third annual meeting of the NSPOT, she was elected president. For many years thereafter she served as the volunteer secretary-treasurer of the organization. NSPOT was renamed the American Occupational Therapy Association (AOTA) in 1921. In 1922, she established the headquarters of AOTA in New York City and worked tirelessly to promote educational and professional standards for the emerging profession . For the next twenty years, she also served as occupational therapy director at the New York State Department of Mental Hygiene. In 1937, she retired from her position of leadership at the AOTA, with First Lady Eleanor Roosevelt in attendance at her farewell lunch.

== Death ==
She died in Philipse Manor, New York and is buried at Locust Hill Cemetery in Hobart, New York.

== Honors and awards ==
The Eleanor Clarke Slagle Lectureship, considered the highest academic award of the AOTA, is named in her honor.

Slagle is listed in the American Occupational Therapy Association, Inc 100 influential people.
