= Alice Constance Owens =

English occupational therapist (1906-1976)

Sign at the entrance to Oakley, one of the Victorian Houses purchased by Owens, to create the School, and then College of Occupational Therapy (1962-1985).

Alice Constance Owens, née Tebbit, MBE (22 August 1906 in Arrington, Cambridgeshire-4 November 1976 in Liverpool) was the first English, Diploma qualified Occupational Therapist. She was a pioneer, leading the professionalisation of an emerging profession in the United Kingdom. Owens was one of the founders of the Association of Occupational Therapists and the World Federation of Occupational Therapists. She chaired Council and committees that established the profession and set educational standards. Owens represented the World Federation at the World Health Organisation General Assembly for twelve years. She was the inaugural Principal of Dorset House, the first training school in the United Kingdom and founded the Liverpool School of Occupational Therapy. Owens is considered to be one of the most influential pioneer researchers. She was awarded the highest honours for her outstanding contribution to occupational therapy. Her legacy continues through scholarships supported by the Constance Owens Trust.

== Early life, education and family ==
Alice Constance Tebbit was born and baptised on 22 August 1906 in Arrington, Cambridgeshire. She was the first of two children of Frank Oswald Tebbit (1879-1957) and Alice Elizabeth Tebbit, née Fletcher (1883-1962). Her father was a 4th generation farmer in South Cambridgeshire. Her mother was from a family of butchers in Birmingham and an active member of the Conservative Party. Oswald William Tebbit (1907-1979) her brother was born the following year.

Constance or Conn, as she was known by family and friends, attended the Perse School for Girls in Cambridge. She was awarded the Upper III prize in 1920.

She started an English Honours Degree and a Diploma in Education at Birmingham University, but stopped when she was "brought face to face with the harsh realities of the life of a patient (a friend) in a mental hospital in the 1920's … (and) developed a consuming interest in psychology, psychological medicine and in the hospital care of the mentally ill."^{:7}

=== Introduction to occupational therapy ===
Owens returned to Cambridgeshire and secured a temporary job with the Student Christian Movement (SCM). At a SCM meeting in London, she met Elizabeth Casson, who was Medical Officer at Holloway Sanatorium (1921-1929). She was "infected by Casson's enthusiasm to improve psychiatric treatment and to start occupational therapy" in England.^{:359} Casson invited her to visit the Sanatorium where she tested her ability to form relationships with chronically and acutely mentally ill patients. Owens passed and became a resident volunteer for three months: she was 19 and too young to be employed.^{:359}

Between 1926 and 1928, Owens worked at three mental hospitals.^{:8} After Holloway, she was resident 'Occupations Officer' at Severalls Hospital, Colchester on a salary of £50 a year. She held a non-resident post at Colney Hatch Lunatic Asylum / Friern Hospital for three months, before travelling to America to study at the Philadelphia School of Occupational Therapy.^{:359}

=== Philadelphia School of Occupational Therapy ===
Owens learned about occupational therapy training from Casson who visited the Boston School of Occupational Therapy in 1926.^{:121} She wrote to the Philadelphia School and was offered a scholarship. It was one of the first schools in America, opening in October 1918 offering a four month course for Reconstruction Aides to work in military hospitals. In the 1920s the program was extended and the curriculum covered anatomy and physiology, kinesiology, neurology and orthopaedics.^{:296}

On 6 September 1928 Owens sailed on the George Washington, part of the United States Line, from Southampton to New York. She was a 21 year old student, enrolled on the Diploma program led by Mrs Samuel H Paul.^{:1-2} Helen S Willard recalled that Owens was an exceptional student, who stood out in a class of 30 that included Spackman.^{:7-8} Owens was awarded the Diploma of the Philadelphia School of Occupational Therapy in 1929 and her name was added to the American Register of Occupational Therapists.^{:8}

Owens was first English person to qualify as an occupational therapist. Margaret Barr Fulton was the first person from the United Kingdom. She qualified from the Philadelphia School in 1924, five years before Owens. Fulton was born in England to Scottish parents. She lived, worked and died in Scotland and identified as a Scot.^{:106}

In the summer of 1929 Casson appointed Owens Principal of the Dorset House School of Occupational Therapy. Casson founded Dorset House, a residential clinic for female psychiatric patients in Clifton, Bristol in 1929. Owens returned to England in November, gathering teaching material for her new role before she left America.^{:14}

=== Family ===
Owens meet her husband at a Christian Club in Chester when she was working at the Cheshire County Mental Hospital (1933-1934).^{:360} George Glyn Owens (1898-1989) was a chartered accountant. He was born in Liverpool and served in the Royal Field Artillery during World War 1. They married on 14 December 1934 at the Parish Church of St John, at Hampstead, London.

They had two children: Elizabeth Tregaye Glyn Owens (1936-2021) born in Liverpool and adopted Ilse Renee Heinemann (1924-2006), a refugee from Czechoslovakia. She was one of the children rescued by Nicholas Winton. In 1940 Owens took her youngest daughter to stay with her godmother, Clare S Spackma in America to ensure her safety during the Liverpool Blitz.^{:362}

Both daughters became occupational therapists. Heinemann was one of six students who studied under Owens at Upton Hospital, Cheshire. In 1947, Heinemann worked at St Loyes College for the Rehabilitation and Training of the Disabled in Exeter. Later that year, she joined the teaching staff at the Liverpool School of Occupational Therapy where her mother was the Principal.^{:27} In 1949, Heinemann was leading a team working in hospitals and camps for displaced persons in West Germany.^{:9} Tregaye studied at Liverpool in the early 1950s, as part of Course 16.^{:366} In 1953 Heinemann was at the Phelps Centre in Washington DC having received a Smith-Mundt and Fullbright Award.^{:49} She stayed in America, married M.R Achter and was working at District of Columbia General Hospital when Owens visited in 1961.^{:21}

== Career ==
=== Principal, Dorset House ===
Dorset House was the first training school for occupational therapists in the United Kingdom. It opened on 1 January 1930 at a "Nursing Home for the treatment of patients suffering from neurotic and psychotic disorders" founded by Casson.^{:14} The school was in one room, there were two students (Paddy Goscombe and Nancy Ross). Owens was only teacher.^{:23}

Between 1930 and 1933 the Dorset House clinic and school was a community, where patients and staff "whether the Medical Director, Nurse, Kitchen Maid, Secretary, Student or Principal" contributed to daily activities and the wellbeing of the home. Casson gave lectures on anatomy, physiology and medical subjects. Owens taught crafts and theory, supervised the students’ work and ran the occupational therapy department at Dorset House. She started clinical training by setting up "small subsidiary departments and supervising the students herself".^{:2} Owens and Goscombe instigated Guide Companies for children at Frenchay Sanatorium and Winfield Orthopaedic Hospital which students helped to run.^{:136}

In early 1933 Casson, Owens, students and staff were invited to join the Royal Medico Psychological Society (now the Royal College of Psychiatrists) visit to Santpoorte, Holland.^{:15}

=== Cheshire County Mental Hospital ===
==== County Mental Hospital 1933-1934 ====
Owens left Dorset House in April 1933 to establish occupational therapy at the Cheshire County Mental Hospital (Countess of Chester Hospital) at Upton-by-Chester. She returned to mental health practice following the introduction of a new grade of staff: "occupational therapist, who should work with, but independently of, the matron and chief male nurse, will carry on therapeutic treatment by occupation under the doctors".^{:360} ^{:15}

She retained a position at Dorset House as Director of Mental Health Practice, arranging clinical experience and lecturing at the School.^{:8} ^{:15}

After her marriage to George Glyn Owens in 1934, she was required to leave due to the marriage bar which prevented the employment of married women.^{360}

==== Upton Emergency Hospital 1941-1945 ====
In 1941 Owens was invited to return to Upton Emergency Hospital Service as the Occupational Therapist in Charge. The Emergency Medical Service was an independent facility providing services for war casualties, on the site of Cheshire County Mental Hospital. Owens supported assistants and others who wished to work within occupational therapy.

She secured the support of Dr G.H. Grills the Medical Superintendent, to train six students including her adopted daughter, on a shortened war emergency course in 1944. At the end of World War 11 the Emergency Hospital Service closed. Owen tried unsuccessfully to find a School where the students could complete their training. Instead, she set up private enterprise, purchased three large dilapidated Victorian houses in Huyton and in 1946 opened the Liverpool School of Occupational Therapy.^{:362}^{:524}

=== Founder, Liverpool School of Occupational Therapy ===
Owens founded and was the Principal of the Liverpool School for sixteen years (1946-1962).^{:5} It was the seventh school in the United Kingdom.^{:524} The first cohort, started in 1946 and comprised the six, final year students from Upton Hospital.^{:9} There were two teachers, Mrs 0, as Owens was known and Miss Adshead for a twice yearly intake and the building work on the houses was unfinished. ^{:363}

She scheduled a 48 hour working week with clinical experience in local hospitals and theoretical study at the school. Wednesday afternoons were reserved for both cohorts to attend a medical lecture, meet an overseas visitor or participate in a debate. Owens was "an informative teacher and her sessions were full of anecdotes: she could hold her audience and convey to them her conviction that you could achieve anything if you tried hard enough".^{:363}

Owens developed close links with Liverpool hospitals, the school grew and become financially viable. She provided occupational therapists for local hospitals, paid their salary and pension and in return, they taught at the school one day a week and supervised students on clinical placements. Owens was appointed to the Mental Health Committee of the new Liverpool Regional Hospital Board.^{:363}

=== Research pioneer ===
Owens wanted to be "academically respectable".^{:9} In the mid-1950s she approached Professor L. S. Hearnshaw at the University of Liverpool about enrolling on a higher degree. First, she was required to pass the University entrance examinations. Owens then commenced studies as a part-time student. She researched the efficacy of the psychological selection tests used at Liverpool and was awarded a Master of Arts in 1960.^{:364}

She was determined to pursue a doctorate but the University regulations did not allow a part-time route. In 1961-1962 Owens converted the School into a Trust, a Limited Company and the School was re-named the College of Occupational Therapy (Liverpool) Ltd. She became a member of the Board of Governors and resigned as Principal to be eligible for a full-time PhD.^{:364} Hearnshaw, her supervisor, said Owens was "one of the most remarkable mature students that I ever had in the Department of Psychology. When she came to me she was nearly 50 years old and had not had any university training".^{:9}

In 1963 Owens was awarded a PhD. It was "pioneer effort", she was the first British occupational therapist to do so.^{:297} Owens investigated whether imagery was of value to students learning anatomy. Hearnshaw noted that "this is now widely recognised but at that time her ideas were regarded with scepticism by many psychologists".^{:9}

Owens was appointed to a part-time post at the Medical Research Council Unit on Occupational Aspects of Ageing at the University of Liverpool. She contributed to work on the psychological changes in older persons, analysing complex data and using computer programming.^{:9} Her pilot study of sick leave among railwaymen threatened with redundancy was published in 1966.

She was an early proponent of the value and relevance of research. In 1964 Owens wrote the first editorial about research for Occupational Therapy, the journal published by the Association of Occupational Therapists.^{:339} She emphasised that "A serious study of our practice as occupational therapists is long overdue … such research will make for wiser professional practice and for more efficient service to the patient".^{:1-2} She followed the editorial with two articles detailing An Occupational Therapist's Approach to Research.

Owens is considered as "one of the most influential occupational therapy research pioneers of the century."^{:340}

=== National and international leadership ===
==== Association of Occupational Therapists ====
Owens played in leading role in the formation of the Association of Occupational Therapists (AOT), the professional body in England, Wales and Northern Ireland. In 1935, Evelyn Mary Macdonald and other Dorset House students invited her to attend a meeting to form an Association. On 9 November Owens hosted a meeting in Liverpool to plan the launch at a General Meeting at the College of Nursing in London on 14 March 1936. At the General Meeting Owens proposed that an Association be formed and a Committee be selected. Following discussion, the motion was carried unanimously. Owens was one of the 12 nominations for Council. All were elected.

At the first Council meeting held on 13 June 1936, Owens was elected chairman, a position she held until November 1941. She was a natural leader. Council priorities included preparing a constitution, enrolling members and setting education standards. Owens was Chairman of the Education and the Examination Committees. Her husband was Honorary Auditor and his London business address became the Registered Office of the Association. Membership doubled from 37 professional members and 21 associate members at March 1937 to 60 professional and 58 associate members in 1938-1939, giving a turnover of £167.15 shillings according to the Annual Report.^{:360-361}

In June 1938 Owens addressed members in the first issue of the Journal of the Association of Occupational Therapists. She stressed the responsibility as a new profession "to make our own professional standards and prove our worth". Owens reported progress about setting national examinations and certification to assure the supply of "trained and qualified workers … to safeguard from unfair competition from untrained persons" and provide students with a syllabus drawn up by experts. She highlighted that these were necessary steps for statutory regulation.^{:9}

With the advent of World War II, Council formed a War Emergency Committee with six members.^{:15} Owens took responsibility for compiling a salary scale and preserving the highest point for Members of the Association. She contributed to revisions of the syllabus and examinations; and marked the Theory of Occupational Therapy and the Practical Crafts and Application examination papers.^{:161}

During the summer of 1940 Owens visited America to take her young daughter to stay with Clare S Spackman, her godmother. She also attended the American Occupational Therapy Association (AOTA) Annual Convention as Chairman of Council and visited hospitals in New York and Baltimore. She spoke at two events at the Convention: a reunion for gradates of the Philadelphia and Milwaukee Schools and a Breakfast for Britons. Owens raised funds for the Association’s War Emergency Fund from the Boston School (US$500) and a "considerable sum" from the Philadelphia School.^{:362}

Owens resigned as Chairman of Council in 1941 on a point of principle. She explained in a letter to members in the Journal, saying "your Chairman" has been refused "the courtesy of an advanced copy" of recommended "changes to syllabus of the War Emergency Diploma and Remission of the Preliminary Examination" which she believed would "lower professional standards" and was not in the best interests of patients or the profession. Her view was "not shared by those present at the meeting". Owens resigned to allow "the Association to present the united front which is so vital to its well-being".^{:8}

She continued as an elected member of Council until 1948, serving as Vice-Chairman from April 1946 to 1948. Owens was sub-editor of the Journal in 1942.^{:362}

In 1949, Owens was invited to be an Honorary Consultant for the International Relief Organisation. She was to assess the need for occupational therapy and organise a service in camps for displaced persons in West Germany.^{:363} The Association had complied a register of occupational therapists willing to work among war wounded.^{:20} A team of five occupational therapists, four students and 60 instructors were distributed between hospitals and camps for displaced persons. The team was led by Heinemann, her adopted daughter. Owens visited and supervised this work for two years, until the project ended.^{:9}

Owens was elected Chair of Council again in 1966.^{:560} She was the first person to hold this position with a doctorate.

==== World Federation of Occupational Therapists ====
Owens was one of the instigators of the World Federation of Occupational Therapists (WFOT). In 1951 she chaired a meeting in Stockholm to discuss a proposal from the American Association to form an international association.^{:14} The meeting was attended by occupational therapists from eight countries who were at an International Society for the Welfare of Cripples event (now Rehabilitation International).^{:363} They passed a resolution that a world organisation should be formed.^{:9}

In April 1952 Owens hosted the four-day Preparatory Commission to create the World Federation at the Liverpool School in Huyton. Representatives from ten countries (USA, Canada, Denmark, South Africa, Sweden, the UK; messages of support from Australia, New Zealand, India and Israel) agreed the constitution, the committee structure and to hold the first International Congress in Edinburgh in 1954.

The problem of two National Associations for Britain (one for Scotland and one for England, Wales and Northern Ireland) when only one Association was required for the World Federation was resolved by agreeing to create a Joint Council to represent both Associations and to nominate the British representatives. Owens nominated Margaret Barr Fulton to be the first President of the World Federation and she was elected Secretary/Treasurer.^{:8-9} ^{363-364}

Owens held several senior posts at the World Federation. She was Secretary-Treasurer (1952-1958), Chair of the Membership Committee (1956-1958), Assistant Secretary/Treasurer (1960-1962) and Education Committee Chair (1960-1962).

She represented WFOT at the World Health Organisation General Assembly in Geneva from 1959 to 1971.^{:9} Owens was a member of the working group involved with technical discussions. She presented her final report as a tape recording and recommended that the Federation send a representative to the Executive Board Meetings to extend their influence.^{:51}

Owens was "one of inspirational pioneers to establish the Federation" serving the international association for twenty years.^{:18}

==== Joint Council of Associations of Occupational Therapists in Great Britain ====
Owens was elected President of the Joint Council, a post she held from 1952 to 1958. The Joint Council collaborated on international affairs and represented the profession in discussions with government about statutory registration. Her correspondence with the Ministry of Health and Department of Health for Scotland, criticising the Provisional Scheme for the Statutory Registration of Professions Supplementary to Medicine was published in the Journal in 1957.

== Publications ==
Throughout her career Owens wrote articles, reports, letters, book reviews, editorials and obituaries for Occupational Therapy, the official journal of the Association. She used her full name or initials (A.C.O.) to indicate authorship. Her publications include:

- Open letter by our Chairman (1938)
- Correspondence: visit to America (1941)
- On twisting raffia and making mats (1944)
- Book reviews (1944)
- Obituary: Elizabeth Casson (1955)
- Prescription forms (1957)
- Obituary: Myera Cantor (1961)
- A World Journey (1961)
- Report:16th World Health Assembly (1963)
- Robbins Report (1963)
- An Occupational Therapists Approach to Research (1964)
- An Occupational Therapists Approach to Research (1964)
- Industrial Change and its Significance for the Occupational Therapist (1964)
- Editorial: technological change (1964)
- Editorial: WFOT Congress (1966)
- Sick leave among railwaymen threatened by redundancy: a pilot study(1966)
- Re-Appraisal: From Youth to Age: A Contextual and Age-Related Approach to Rehabilitation (1967)
- The Development of a Professional Organisation (1967)

== Death and legacy ==
Owens spent her final years with her husband in Wales at St Enodoc, Borth Y Gest Porthmadog. She loved the view across the Afon Glaslyn estuary. She painted, corresponded and entertained friends and family and enjoyed her new role as a proud grandmother to two granddaughters.^{:4}

Alice Constance Owens died on 4 November 1976 at Whiston Hospital. The cause of death was myocardial infarction due to a coronary thrombosis, following a successful knee hemi-arthroplasty.^{:365}

A service of thanksgiving for her life and work was held in The Lady Chapel, Liverpool Cathedral on 22 January 1977. She was remembered as a "leader in Occupational Therapy … dedicated to the education of occupational therapists in this country and overseas. She was an international figure, active in encouraging exchange of students and therapists between countries, and in fostering post-graduate education and research". Tributes were sent from family and friends in America, Australia, Denmark, New Zealand and the UK.^{:5} Fulton described Owens as "my counsellor - at times my sparring partner, but in work and retirement always a valued friend".^{:9}

Her legacy is two professional associations. The World Federation of Occupational Therapists has 117 member organisations at September 2026. The Association of Occupational Therapists became the British Association of Occupational Therapists in 1974 and the Royal College of Occupational Therapists in 2017.

The legacy of Owens, and her adopted daughter Renee Achter, endure through education scholarships. The Constance Owens Trust is a charity registered in the UK. The Renee Achter Scholarship is managed by the American Occupational Therapy Foundation.

== Awards and honours ==
In June 1959 Owens was appointed a Member of the Order of the British Empire (MBE) in the Queen's Birthday Honours. She was made an Honorary Fellow of the World Federation of Occupational Therapists in 1964 for distinguished service to the Federation. In 1972, she was one of the first to be awarded a Fellowship of the College of Occupational Therapists for exceptional service to the profession.^{:545} Owens was also an honorary member of the Scottish Association.^{:3}
