= Alice C. Jantzen =

- Alice C. Jantzen, from the 1939 yearbook of Wellesley College
- Born: August 17, 1918; Brookline, Massachusetts
- Died: October 22, 1983 (age 65); Columbia, Maryland
- Occupation: Occupational therapist

Alice Catherine Jantzen (August 17, 1918 – October 22, 1983) was an American occupational therapist, educator, researcher and author. She was the first president of the American Occupational Therapy Foundation (AOTF). Jantzen was professor of occupational therapy at the University of Florida for 18 years (1958 to 1976).

== Early life and education ==
Jantzen was born in Brookline, Massachusetts. She was the first of five children of Francis Thomas Jantzen and Alice Marie Doyle Jantzen. Her father graduated from Harvard Medical School and was a resident surgeon at Carney and Boston City hospitals.

Jantzen attended Brookline High School and Wellesley College, graduating with a degree in the History of Art.^{:27} She was first soprano in the College Choir and a member of the golf team.

In the 1940s Jantzen served in the United States Navy. In the 1950s and 1960s, she studied occupational therapy and earned a master degree and a doctorate. She completed a two-year, certificate program at the Boston School of Occupational Therapy. As a veteran she obtained funding for training under the 1944 G.I. Bill.^{:27}

Jantzen was awarded a National Foundation Teaching Fellowship in 1956 and gained a Master Degree in Education from the University of Pennsylvania. She did her doctoral studies at Boston College, producing a “landmark study” analysing data from the American Occupational Therapy Association (AOTA) member registry which dispelled myths about the careers of female occupational therapists.

== Career ==
=== United States Navy ===
Jantzen was in the United States Navy for twelve years, including three years on active duty. She enlisted on 3 July 1943 as an Ensign. Jantzen is named in the Military Registers for Commissioned and Warrant Officers of the United States Naval and Reserve, indicating she was one of many Women Accepted for Volunteer Emergency Service, or WAVES, who served in the Navy.

She worked at the United States Naval Research Laboratory in Washington, D.C. during World War II. Between October 1943-March 1944, Gilbert D. Kinzer, a physicist and Jantzen investigated "the velocity loss of a 4-inch HC Mark 15 projectile penetrating thin plate at velocities well above limit". Jantzen knew that her "intellectual talents are in science and maths".^{:27}

=== Occupational therapy ===
Jantzan struggled after leaving the Navy, saying "I didn't know what I wanted to do, and it was sort of hard to find a job". Her father gave her a brochure about the Philadelphia School of Occupational therapy, suggesting that she might like the "mixture of Art and Medicine". Jantzen was accepted at the Philadelphia School. Following her father’s death in 1950, she decided to study at the Boston School of Occupational Therapy so she could remain at home with her mother.^{:27-28}

==== Training and clinical practice ====
Jantzen trained at the Boston School, one of the oldest which was established in 1918 and affiliated with Tufts University in 1945. She was part of Class 1952. As a College graduate, Jantzen studied a compressed, Advanced Course, comprising two semesters of professional technical training and two semesters of clinical training. Later, Jantzen described her training as "a pure apprenticeship system. Don't think. Just do". ^{:28-30}

Her first clinical post was at the New York State Rehabilitation Hospital at Haverstraw, (now the Helen Hayes Hospital), treating children with cerebral palsy. Jantzen "really learned" on her student placement at Haverstraw which included research that produced her first publication.^{:29-31} She continued to practice, as a consultant at the United Cerebral Palsy in Jacksonville for five years, when at the University of Florida.^{:35}

==== Educator and researcher ====
Jantzen started her career in education as an Assistant Professor at the School of Occupational Therapy at the Western Michigan College, Kalamazoo. She was there from 1954 to 1956, a time when it was considered "the biggest and the best O.T. school in the country".^{:33}

Next, Jantzen was an instructor, while studying for a Master degree at the University of Pennsylvania. She chose the subject of Guidance and Counselling to learn about developing valid, reliable and standardised assessments. Helen Willard, Director of the Philadelphia School of Occupational Therapy, sponsored and helped Jantzen visit relevant facilities.^{:33-34}

In 1958 Jantzen was appointed as the founding Director of Occupational Therapy at the College of Health Related Services, University of Florida, a post she held for eighteen years. She developed a curriculum that integrated clinical training into patient services at the new Shands Teaching Hospital at the University. The curriculum was "controversial" because it emphasised observation, thinking, problem solving and evaluation, skills necessary for clinical practice, rather than rote learning. The program offered many elective placements and became a model for the 1983 Essentials of an Accredited Education Programme for the Occupational Therapist. ^{:124}

Jantzen was one of the first to advocate post-baccalaureate degree entry for occupational therapy. She prepared herself, faculty and students for this future. Jantzen took leave of absence to gain a doctoral degree, included research in the curriculum and gained grant funding for research. Post-baccalaureate degree entry level came into effect in the USA on January 1, 2007.

In 1971 Jantzen received a distinguished faculty award from the University of Florida. She was the Eleanor Clark Slagle Lecturer in 1973. This lecture is the highest scholarly honor awarded by the American Occupational Therapy Association (AOTA). Jantzen spoke about education; professionalism and research, emphasising the need to increase research to validate theory or practice.^{:529}

Jantzen was appointed head of the occupational therapy programme at Colorado State University in 1976. She retired early, due to ill-health in 1978.

During her career, Jantzen educated more than a thousand occupational therapists. She summarised the different impact of clinical practice and education in the following way: "It's nice that you can go out an treat ten patients a day. But if I teach ten students a day and then they go out and each teaches ten more, I accomplish much more--it's the geometrics of an educator's influence that interest me".^{:123}

There are few anecdotes about Jantzen. A student who qualified in 1969, remembered her as an inspiration, who offered her a scholarship to complete the program after her marriage and pushing her to succeed throughout her career. Another recalled Jantzen’s ability to create "a warm and caring environment where each of us was carefully nurtured to professional status and adulthood. No problem, be it large or small, personal or academic, was beyond Dr. Jantzen's realm of solutions".^{:77} Two faculty (and peers on the 2017 AOTA list of 100 most influential people) experienced Jantzen’s leadership very differently. Bing described a "tumultuous relationship" that ended when he was not reappointed, which left him feeling "whipped" and wanting to leave occupational therapy.^{:316} Llorens considered Jantzen "very creative in her recruiting because it was the South".^{:p323-234} In 1971, soon after the civil rights movement, Jantzen recruited Llorens, a black faculty member. She anticipated racial tensions and arranged for the Llorens family to meet community leaders, including the Mayor of Gainesville, who was black.

==== Volunteer leadership and mentor ====
Jantzen held volunteer leadership roles in the profession at state and national levels. She served as President of the Florida Occupational Therapy Association.^{[2]} She shared her educational and administrative expertise, influencing national standards as a volunteer and through working with officers at the American Occupational Therapy Association. She was a peer reviewer for the American Journal of Occupational Therapy and on the Advisory Board for a new mental health journal.

From 1965 to 1966, Jantzen was the first president of the American Occupational Therapy Foundation (AOTF).^{:2} This organisation was set up to advance the science of occupational therapy, to provide scholarships and fellowships, to finance and conduct research. Jantzen was a consultant to the development of the Foundation's Roster of Research and a member of the Foundation’s Institutional Review Board.

== Publications ==
Jantzen wrote the second book published about research for occupational therapists^{:822} It received positive reviews, as "practical, readable, and concise. It takes research right to its core. Our profession really needs this book". The book was her most tangible legacy to her profession.

She used her research and articles to challenge commonly held views about higher academic qualifications and the career paths of occupational therapists.^{:123}

- An evaluation method for cerebral palsy (1955)
- Proposed revision of the professional education of occupational therapists (1958)
- The contribution of occupational therapy to patient care (1960)
- Some strengths of occupational therapy (1963)
- Graduate degrees held by occupational therapist (1964)
- Patient evaluation of occupational therapy programs (1965)
- A prediction of clinical performance (1965)
- The effects of response sets in questionnaire studies (1965)
- Relative effectiveness of personality achievement and interest measures in the prediction of a performance criterion (1969)
- Definitions of mental health and mental illness (1969)
- Some characteristics of female occupational therapists 1970 (1972)
- Employment patterns of female occupational therapists,1970. Some characteristics of female occupational therapists (1972)
- Some characteristics of male occupational therapists, 1970 (1972)
- 1973 Eleanor Clarke Slagle Lecture. Academic occupational therapy: a career speciality (1974)
- A proposal for occupational therapy education (1977)

== Death and legacy ==
Alice Catherine Jantzen died in 1983, aged 65 following a long illness. She died at her home in Golden Hook, Columbia, Maryland. Following a funeral Mass she was buried at Meadowridge Memorial Park Elkridge, Howard County, Maryland.

Her contribution to occupational therapy research, education and practice is commemorated at national and state levels. In 1986, the American Occupational Therapy Foundation established an Alice C. Jantzen Scholarship Fund, an annual award for a graduate with a research emphasis.

The February 1986 issue of the American Journal of Occupational Therapy was dedicated to Jantzen’s commitment to education, research and mentoring to support the development of future generations. There was a tribute to a friend, colleague and mentor. "Today, her influence on the program continues with on-going curriculum revisions, close inter-collegial relationships among faculty members, academic excellence in students, a view of the department in the broader perspective of the university, and a commitment to occupational therapy as a valuable and viable health care service".^{:95}

In 2008, the University of Florida established an Alice C. Jantzen Fellowship Fund in her memory. This was for an annual scholarship for occupational therapy students who portray exemplary leadership and academic excellence. In 2025, the sponsors made an additional gift to fully endow the Fellowship, to honour "a pioneer of modern occupational therapy practice … (who) was not afraid to advocate for change".

To mark its 100th anniversary in 2017, the American Occupational Therapy Association identified "100 Influential People" in the field, and Jantzen was one of those named.

== Awards and honors ==
Jantzen was awarded the two highest honors bestowed by the American Occupational Therapy Association: the Roster of Fellows and the OT Award of Merit.^{:124} In 1973, she was one of the first recipients of the AOTA Roster of Fellows, an award for sustained, volunteer service, leadership or expertise, that had a measurable impact on the profession. Jantzen received the OT Award of Merit, conferred in recognition of long-standing work that advanced the profession, in 1979.
