= Clare S. Spackman =

American occupational therapist

- Clare S. Spackman, from a 1936 newspaper photo
- Born: Clara Spencer Spackman; December 8, 1909; Ardmore, Pennsylvania, U.S.
- Died: August 5, 1992 (age 82); Doylestown, Pennsylvania, U.S.
- Occupation: Occupational therapist
- Notable work: Principles of Occupational Therapy (1947)

Clare Spencer Spackman (December 8, 1909 – August 5, 1992) was an American occupational therapist. She was an educator, an expert on rehabilitation and international leader. She co-edited Principles of Occupational Therapy (1947) a seminal textbook with Helen S. Willard. Spackman was a founder member and second president of the World Federation of Occupational Therapists (1957–1964).

== Early life and education ==
Spackman was born in Ardmore, Pennsylvania, the daughter of Henry Spencer Spackman and Jane Fryer Spencer Spackman. Her father was an engineer and president of his own engineering company.^{:135} He served in World War I. Her grandparents were Henry S. Spackman, a former politician, and Anna Cornelia Spackman, who was commended by Abraham Lincoln for her work caring for wounded soldiers during the American Civil War.

In 1930 Spackman graduated from the Philadelphia School of Occupational Therapy with a Diploma. She was awarded a Bachelor’s degree in education in 1941 and a Master of Education in 1942, both from the University of Pennsylvania.

== Career ==
Spackman began her career at Bellevue Hospital, New York (1929–1930). In 1931, she worked as an occupational therapist at Jeanes Hospital, Philadelphia and craft teacher at the Episcopal Academy, Newtown Square.: 3-4

=== Philadelphia School of Occupational Therapy Curative Workshop ===
In 1933 Spackman was appointed Assistant Director of the Curative Workshop at the Philadelphia School of Occupational Therapy. The Philadelphia School, founded in 1918, set up the Curative Workshop shortly afterwards. It was a "vital and valuable" part of the School because it "served as a clinical education site and classroom laboratory" where students learned and where "convalescing patients were given occupational treatment". ^{:5}

Spackman was promoted to Director of the Curative Workshop in 1935, replacing Helen S Willard who was appointed Director of the Philadelphia School. Concurrently, Spackman was Director of the occupational therapy department at the University of Pennsylvania Graduate Hospital.^{:7}

A year later, Spackman expounded five axioms for treating patients in a general hospital. The axioms in summary are a "desire to help all people … her work must be a vital part of her life, a real vocation … a belief in the value of occupational therapy as treatment … ability to put herself in this patient's place". Spackman’s fifth axiom is "scientific understanding of the patient, his physical condition, mental reaction and capacities, and his economic position, and the object of the occupational therapy treatment. With this knowledge the therapist may offer the patient … something scientifically chosen as the best possible occupation for that patient, an occupation which is applicable to the patient's present physical and mental capabilities, and also takes into consideration his future physical, mental, and economic needs and limitations, and his rehabilitation."^{:16–17}

Spackman led rehabilitation at the Curative Workshop until 1970 and at the University of Pennsylvania Graduate Hospital from 1935 to 1965. Under her leadership, clinical experience was integral to the academic program: "students learned to address physical and psychosocial aspects of disability in the interventions they practiced at the Curative Workshop".^{:4} Students applied Spackman's "aim of occupational therapy the treatment of physical disabilities as improving joint motion, muscle strength, developing motor skills, work tolerance and a 'wholesome' psychological reaction" using "exercise, therapeutic equipment like the bicycle saw for knee, hip and back strengthening and increased range of motion". ^{:168}

She developed services to support the health of the community and extend occupational therapy into new areas of practice. These included one of the first treatment programmes for children with cerebral palsy, encouraging self-help and self-care skills through play. Rehabilitation for return-to-work was provided for people injured at work, funded by insurance companies or offered free under community covenants.

Spackman retired in 1970 as Associate Professor at the University of Pennsylvania School of Allied Medical Professions, a position she had held since 1950 when the Philadelphia School merged with the University of Pennsylvania.

=== Rehabilitation ===
Spackman’s expertise in rehabilitation was acknowledged through her contributions to local, national and international organisations. During World War 2, she chaired the Rehabilitation Committee, set up by the Council of Social Agencies to co-ordinate all Civilian Rehabilitation programmes in Philadelphia. ^{:7}

In 1956, she represented the World Federation of Occupational Therapists at a meeting in New York of the Conference of the World Organizations Interested in the Handicapped.

Spackman received the 1965 annual award of the International Society for Rehabilitation of the Disabled's United States Committee for her "meritorious service in the field of international rehabilitation for the physically handicapped".

=== World Federation of Occupational Therapists ===
Spackman was an internationalist. She was a founding member of, and then served as a Council member representing America in, the World Federation of Occupational Therapists (WFOT). She "took leadership for the United States"^{:251} at the Preparatory Commission which agreed the objectives, constitution and committee structure of the World Federation, held at the Liverpool School of Occupational Therapy in April 1952.

She served as the second President of the World Federation (1958–1964) Roll of Honour and was elected Assistant Honorary Secretary–Treasurer and Chair of the Education Committee (1968–1970).

In 1960, Spackman and fellow Council member Helen S Willard toured the Western Pacific in their own time and at their own expense, giving advice and assistance in developing occupational therapy in Japan, the Philippines, Hong Kong, Saigon, Bangkok, India, South Africa and Portugal. Their "dedication and unselfish contribution to our profession" was noted. ^{:19}

Spackman chaired the Program Committee that organised the third International Congress of the World Federation held in Philadelphia in October 1962. The congress theme "Cultural Patterns Affecting Rehabilitation" blended her interest in rehabilitation and internationalisation. Over 1,500 delegates from 37 countries attended the five-day event that included visits, day study tours, lectures, films, scientific exhibits and social receptions. At the WFOT Business Meeting, Spackman was thanked "for her excellent and untiring work in her own country and in many others".^{:5}

== Publications ==
=== Articles ===
Spackman published articles in scholarly journals including American Journal of Physical Medicine and Rehabilitation, Occupational Therapy, American Journal of Occupational Therapy, and Australian Occupational Therapy Journal.

- "The Approach to the Patient in a General Hospital" (1937).
- "The Second Pan-Pacific Conference on Rehabilitation" (1963)
- "A history of the practice of occupational therapy for restoration of physical function: 1917–1967" (1968)
- "The World Federation of Occupational Therapists: 1952–1967" (1969)

=== Principles of Occupational Therapy ===
Spackman co-edited Principles of Occupational Therapy, one of the first textbooks written by occupational therapists for occupational therapy personnel. The first edition was published in 1947. She and Willard co-edited the next three editions, published in 1954, 1963 and 1970.

In addition, Spackman made substantial contributions as an author. In the first edition she wrote a 126-page chapter titled "Occupational Therapy for Patients with Physical Disabilities". In 1954, this chapter covered the "treatment of limitation of motion of joints, peripheral nerve injuries, spastic hemiplegia in adults, multiple sclerosis and industrial injuries". She wrote four chapters in the fourth edition about the co–ordination of occupational therapy with other allied medical related services, methods of instruction, occupational therapy as a supportive measure and occupational therapy for the restoration of physical function.

The 14th edition of Willard and Spackman’s Occupational Therapy was published in 2023. The textbook they initiated is regarded as "an index of the growth of knowledge and the record of changing perspectives in the profession".

== Awards and honors ==
Spackman received the highest honors awarded by the American Occupational Therapy Association and the World Federation. In 1956, she received the Award of Merit] from the American Association. In 1970, she was named as a Distinguished Daughter of Pennsylvania and made a Fellow of the World Federation for her outstanding contributions and distinguished service.

== Personal life and legacy ==
Spackman was godmother to Elizabeth Tregaye Glyn Owens, the daughter of Alice Constance Owens. In 1940 Owens took her daughter to stay with Spackman during World War 11. She and Helen S Willard "understood the importance of preserving the 'sacredness' of private versus professional life … they led quiet lives, meaningful lives in which they would 'stow away' to the cottage on the shore of Lake Champlain in Vermont, called Stowaway, where they would read, rest, and explore the countryside".^{:5-6}

Clare Spencer Spackman died aged 82 at Doylestown Hospital, Doylestown, Pennsylvania.

Spackman is remembered by her family as "very considerate" and modest. She "moved to Pine Run (a community for seniors) years ago, when she was in good health, so she would never be a burden to any member of her family". When a niece asked about her professional achievements she wrote "I got involved in our international association and ended up as president."^{:4}

As a colleague, Spackman was "direct, down to earth and wonderfully well organized. She always had a story to illustrate the point she was making and a question to challenge further thought". She was "organized, gracious and factual"^{:244} and "the very epitome of the nit-picking, tweezers crowd". ^{:248} Spackman was considered one of the old guard: she "exemplified old-money roots, and set the old-guard community view and standards for proper young women entering occupational therapy".^{:245}

Her legacy as one of the hundred most influential people in occupational therapy, was acknowledged in 2017 by the American Association in their centenary year.
