= Lynn McDonald (disambiguation) =

Lynn McDonald is a Canadian professor, activist and politician.

Lynn McDonald may also refer to:

- Lynn McDonald (academic), Canadian social work academic
- Lynn McDonald (psychologist), American psychologist

== See also ==
- Lyn Macdonald (1929–2021), British military historian
- Lynne Macdonald (b. 1949), New Zealand and England netball international
- Evelyn Mary Macdonald (1905–1993), British occupational therapist
