= Frances Rutherford =

New Zealand artist and occupational therapist

Frances Moran Rutherford
- Born: 29 April 1912; Masterton, New Zealand
- Died: 22 November 2006 (aged 94); Auckland, New Zealand
- Education: Ilam School of Fine Arts Liverpool School of Occupational Therapy
- Known for: Painting, Occupational therapy
- Notable work: My View No. 8 (Auckland Harbour)

Frances Moran Rutherford (29 April 1912 in Masterton, New Zealand – 22 November 2006 in Auckland, New Zealand) was an artist, an occupational therapist and educator who was instrumental in gaining recognition for occupational therapy in New Zealand.

== Early life and education ==
Frances Moran Rutherford was the fourth of five children of Charles William Rutherford and Althea Mary Rutherford, nee Robinson. Rutherford was disabled by poliomyelitis at the age of ten. She left secondary education without qualifications. At the age of 26, she enrolled at the Canterbury College of Fine Arts, now Ilam School of Fine Arts. Rutherford graduated with a Diploma in Fine Arts and worked as an art mistress. In 1948 she travelled to London to study at the Central School of Arts and Crafts, now the Central School of Art and Design.

== Career ==
=== Occupational therapy ===
Sometime after post graduate study in London, Rutherford began a second career as an occupational therapist. Her application to train at the only school in New Zealand in Auckland was rejected due to her disability. She was accepted by a new school in Britain. The Liverpool School of Occupational Therapy in Huyton was opened in 1947 by Constance Owens, nee Tebbit. Owens was the first Principal at Dorset House, the first School in England established by Dr Elizabeth Casson in 1930. Rutherford qualified in 1952 and was awarded the Diploma of the Association of Occupational Therapists, having completed the national examinations set by the professional body for England, Northern Ireland and Wales.

In 1954 Rutherford described using art therapy with tuberculosis patients in the sanatoria at Masterton Public Hospital. In a conference paper for the New Zealand Registered Occupational Therapists Association, she explained how 'art therapy emphasized the emotional and creative aspects of living and helped in the readjustment of the patient'.

Rutherford was appointed Vice Principal in 1955 and later Principal of the New Zealand School of Occupational Therapy, based at Auckland Mental Hospital. She was the third Principal, following Margaret Buchanan (nee Inman) 1940–1950 and Hazel Skilton (nee Barton) 1950–1960.^{187} Rutherford built on their work, creating a new syllabus in collaboration with Head Therapists from five teaching hospitals; promoting self-directed learning and better facilities for students. She believed that 'the school must encourage good creative activity ... the student must be helped to develop a wider knowledge of life and people therefore becoming a better person for having studied and lived within the community life of the Training School'.^{20}

In 1958 Rutherford was the first New Zealander to be awarded a Teachers' Diploma of the Association of Occupational Therapists. The Diploma was by examination of a thesis that investigated the merits and disadvantages of state control of occupational therapy education in New Zealand. She was one of only twelve Teaching Members of the Association.

As Principal of the Auckland School, Rutherford was the Dominion Supervisor of Occupational Therapy in New Zealand, a senior official of the Health Department. She inspected hospitals where qualified occupational therapists were employed, arranged clinical training for students and dealt with enquires from Medical Superintendents and Matrons.^{18-19}

Rutherford was the New Zealand delegate for the World Federation of Occupational Therapists (WFOT) at the Council meeting held in Sydney in September 1960. Occupational Therapy New Zealand/Whakaora Ngangahau Aotearoa was one of ten Associations that set up the World Federation in 1952.

She led the Auckland School until 1972. She retired when the School closed and occupational therapy education was relocated to the new Central Institute of Technology, near Wellington. Rutherford recorded the history of the school, completing the document in 1976.

=== Artist ===
Rutherford was a notable artist. Her works include My View No. 8 (Auckland Harbour).

She exhibited with the Auckland Society of Arts and at the New Visions Gallery, including the Nikau Palms exhibition in 1967.

== Death and legacy ==
Frances Moran Rutherford died on 22 November 2006, aged 94. She was buried in the family grave at Archer Street Cemetery, Masterton.

Her legacy is the continued expansion of occupational therapy in New Zealand. The first School opened in 1940. Ten years later circa 50 therapists 'from many parts of the Dominion' attended the first convention organised by the New Zealand Occupational Therapy Association. The 2022 Annual Report of the Occupational Therapy Board of New Zealand/Te Poari Whakaora Ngangahau o Aotearoa records that there were 3,319 occupational therapists holding a current annual practising certificate and 304 Māori or Pasifika practitioners.

Another legacy is the Frances Rutherford Lecture Award. This was established in 1983 by Occupational Therapy New Zealand/Whakaora Ngangahau Aotearoa to recognise the contribution she made to occupational therapy. The award is presented biennially at the Occupational Therapy New Zealand/Whakaora Ngangahau Aotearoa Conference. Rutherford is remembered for 'her commitment to occupational therapy; the holistic view of persons integrated in mind, body and spirit; and her belief in self directed learning.'^{55} She was a 'a warm and caring person who was visionary in her drive for the advanced preparation of New Zealand occupational therapy clinical leaders and educators'.^{188}
