= Occupational therapy in the United Kingdom =

This article discusses occupational therapy (OT) in the United Kingdom.

== Overview ==
Every year around 1,500 new students embark on training to become registered occupational therapists. To qualify as an occupational therapist one is required undertake an approved programme of study at one of the 31 UK universities offering occupational therapy education. There are a variety of full and part-time programmes available in occupational therapy the UK, most are Bachelor of Science (with Honours) degrees; some are Postgraduate Diplomas, others are Master's degrees.

All programmes must be approved by the Health and Care Professions Council (HCPC) as meeting their minimum standards. This approval is mandatory in order for the graduates to be registered to practice. In contrast, accreditation is a voluntary process which confers further recognition of a programme by the Royal College of Occupational Therapists (RCOT). Those universities that continue to be accredited have committed to working in partnership with the professional body (the RCOT) to maintain high standards of education and practice, and to steer the profession's development within the UK and abroad.

The content of programmes varies but all combine both practice and academic study. Academic components may include anatomy and physiology, psychology and sociology, occupational therapy knowledge and skills, creative and management skills, therapeutic interventions, environmental adaptations and research methods and applications.

== History ==
In the late 19th and early 20th centuries, the establishment of public health measures to control infectious diseases included the building of fever hospitals. Patients with tuberculosis were recommended to have a regime of prolonged bed rest followed by a gradual increase in exercise. Dr Philip, a Scottish physician, prescribed graded activity from complete rest through to gentle exercise and eventually to activities such as digging, sawing, carpentry and window cleaning. During this period a farm colony near Edinburgh and a village settlement near Papworth in Cambridgeshire were established, both of which aimed to employ people in appropriate long-term work prior to their return to open employment.

During and after the First World War, casualties amongst young men resulted in an acute shortage of manpower in the workforce. The need to re-establish these men in open employment facilitated the growth of OT in the treatment of those with physical disabilities. Curative workshops were opened within military hospitals, based on similar workshops already established in the United States, and were equipped with tools and machinery to exercise joints and muscles. Based on these workshops the first occupational therapy department in Scotland was opened in 1936 at the Astley Ainslie Institution in Edinburgh, where at the same time the first Occupational Therapy Training Centre was opened.

Margaret Barr Fulton became the first occupational therapist to work in the United Kingdom in 1925. She qualified at the Philadelphia School in the United States and was appointed to the Aberdeen Royal Hospital for mental patients where she worked until her retirement in 1963. During that time, she gained an international reputation for her department and for her part in the development of both the Scottish Association (SAOT) and the World Federation of Occupational Therapists (WFOT). OT was introduced into England by Dr Elizabeth Casson who had visited similar establishments in America. In 1929 she established her own residential clinic in Bristol, Dorset House, for "women with mental disorders", and worked as its medical director. It was here in 1930 that she founded the first school of occupational therapy in the UK, Dorset House, The Promenade, Clifton. Its first Principal was Constance Tebbit (later Owens) who returned from training as an occupational therapist in Philadelphia to take up her post. She later went on to set up the Liverpool School of Occupational Therapy. She opened Dorset House School of Occupational Therapy in Bristol in 1930. Her interest in occupational therapy continued with involvement in the Association of Occupational Therapists (AOT), established in 1936. The Second World War added impetus to the development of occupational therapy as the profession played a vital role in the rehabilitation and re-establishment of wounded soldiers into the workforce.

== Motivations of occupational therapists ==
Occupational therapists work from an understanding that there is a relationship between the things that people do and their health and well-being This is a list of some of the characteristics of occupations, as discussed in literature in the last decade:

- Occupations are activities both meaningful and purposeful to the individual performing them
- They also usually have sociocultural meaning
- Occupations fill and structure time
- They tend to be grouped according to purpose: self-care, leisure and productivity (or work)
- They support roles and participation in society
- Occupations contribute to the individual's sense of identity
- Activities are not occupations if they are involuntary, or if they are aimed at a goal which does not involve individual meaning and participation

It has been suggested that occupation can be defined simply as "doing, being and becoming", a simple definition which captures the notion of subjectively meaningful activity which results in some kind of transformation in the "doer".

The word occupation has a relatively precise usage in the fields of occupational therapy and occupational science but other disciplines (such as anthropology, psychology, leisure studies) have an interest in the human activities. It can be argued that all activities are meaningful, given that they are socially situated, symbolic constructs, and so the understanding of an activity as an occupation rests, perhaps on personal meaningfulness.
