= Georgina Pope Yeatman =

American architect (1902–1982)

- Born: Georgina Pope Yeatman; June 26, 1902; Ardsley, New York, U.S.
- Died: October 30, 1982; North Carolina, U.S.
- Education: University of Pennsylvania, MIT
- Occupation: Architect
- Father: Pope Yeatman
- Buildings: YWCA Building

Georgina Pope Yeatman (June 26, 1902 – October, 1982) was an American architect. In 1936, she became the first woman to serve as the director of architecture for the city of Philadelphia, Pennsylvania, which, at that time, was the third largest city in the United States.

== Formative years ==
The daughter of prominent mining engineer Pope Yeatman, Georgina Pope Yeatman was born in Ardsley, New York, on June 26, 1902.

A 1919 graduate of the Shipley School in Bryn Mawr, Pennsylvania, Yeatman earned her associate degree from the University of Pennsylvania in 1922. When the University of Pennsylvania refused to award a bachelor's degree in architecture to a woman, she enrolled at the Massachusetts Institute of Technology, and was awarded her degree at MIT in 1925.

== Aviation training and work ==
Sometime after her graduation from MIT, Yeatman trained as a pilot. She then obtained her private pilot's license in 1931, and purchased a Waco silver airplane, which she used for short business trips and when visiting her parents at their summer home, Chiselhurst, which was located near Jaffrey, New Hampshire. According to a 1937 St. Petersburg Times report, "she got a new slant on architecture and gardens from the air, and combined this pleasure with her profession." Among her designs was that of the Philadelphia Aviation Country Club.

During Pennsylvania's severe flooding in 1936, Yeatman reportedly flew her airplane to affected areas, where she dropped food and medicine to survivors.

=== Accident ===
In 1939, Yeatman landed her airplane on one wheel at Wings Field near Conshohocken, Pennsylvania after the left wheel "and half the undercarriage" of the plane was ripped off as the craft struck a root protruding from the runway during takeoff from the Beaufort, North Carolina airport. After informing Beaufort's officials about the situation, she successfully flew her plane for two hours to Pennsylvania, where she requested that the airfield be cleared for an emergency landing. Rolling on one wheel for fifty feet, she brought the plane safely to rest on its left side. All who were aboard escaped unharmed.

== Architecture and public service career ==
Yeatman began her architectural career in the office of Bissell & Sinkler, becoming one of only four women in the Commonwealth of Pennsylvania to be licensed as architects. She then started her own private practice by, effectively, taking over the office of Bissell & Sinkler.

In January 1936, Yeatman was appointed director of the Department of City Architecture for the city of Philadelphia and held this post for a four-year term. A member of Philadelphia's zoning board, she also served on the commission that had been appointed by the city's mayor to oversee the transformation of the Hog Island municipal airport into an air-rail-marine terminal.

In April 1936, Yeatman urged her fellow members of the zoning board to reclassify a portion of Clinton Street from commercial to "Class D-1 Residential" to preserve the neighborhood's historic character.

Paid an annual salary of $8,000, she was the first woman to serve as the city's director of architecture.

After completing her tenure as director of architecture, she was reappointed by the mayor, in December 1940, to a three-year term on the Zoning Board of Adjustment.

=== Architectural projects ===
According to the St. Louis Post-Dispatch, Yeatman's project list, as of January 1936, included plans for the:

- Davis Memorial Park, Charleston, West Virginia;
- Pennsylvania Epileptic Hospital and Colony Farm;
- Philadelphia Aviation Country Club; and the
- Philadelphia School of Occupational Therapy.

She also designed plans for a residential housing development that was built near Paoli, Pennsylvania, an addition to the Oakburne School, individual homes and residential developments in New Hampshire and Virginia, and an addition to her alma mater, the Shipley School.

A member of the American Association of Architects and boards of directors of the Philadelphia Housing Association and Octavia Hill Association, Yeatman also served as an architectural consultant to the Young Women's Christian Association (YWCA) in Philadelphia.

== Personal interests ==
Registered as a member of the Democratic Party, Yeatman, reportedly enjoyed horseback riding. In November 1936, Yeatman purchased approximately 25,000 acres of land in Carteret County, North Carolina from the University of Chicago. Described as "unsuited for cultivation," the land was reportedly a haven for wildlife, including bear, deer and quail.

== Death ==
Yeatman died at her home in North Carolina on October 30, 1982. She was survived by a sister, two daughters and a grandson. Her funeral was held in North Carolina.
