= Pope Yeatman =

American mining engineer (1861–1953)

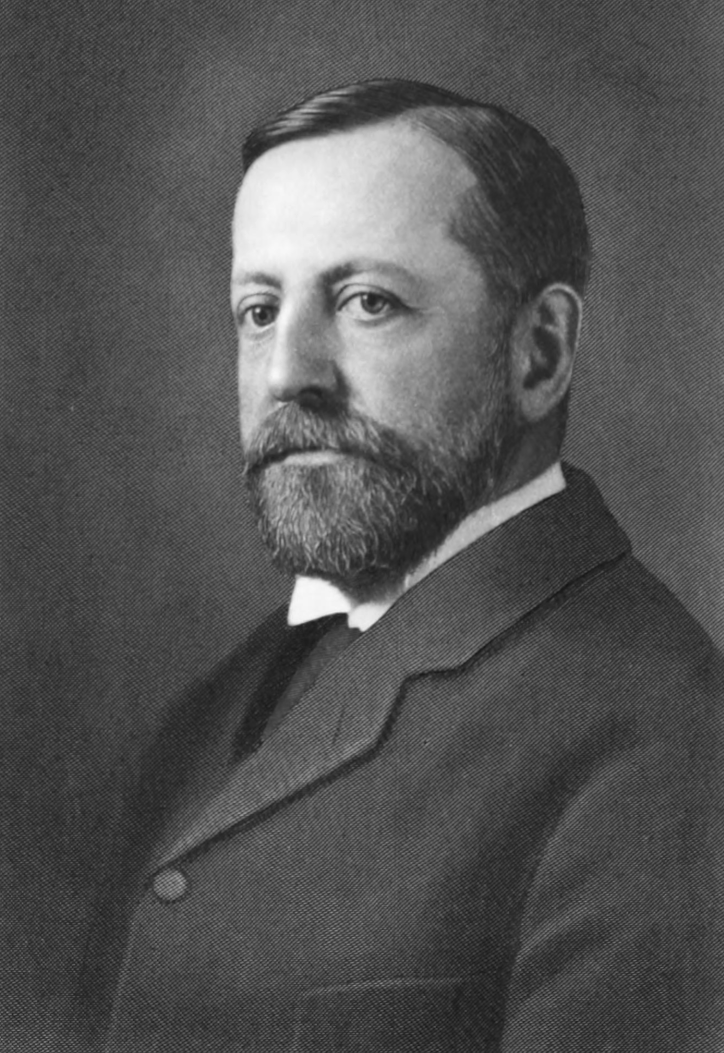
- Yeatman in a 1916 publication
- Born: August 3, 1861; St. Louis, Missouri, U.S.
- Died: December 5, 1953 (aged 92); Chestnut Hill, Philadelphia, Pennsylvania, U.S.
- Education: Washington University in St. Louis
- Occupations: Mining engineer; consultant
- Spouse: Georgie Claiborne Watkins (m. 1894; died 1941)
- Children: 3, including Georgina
- Relatives: Nathaniel Pope (grandfather)

Signature
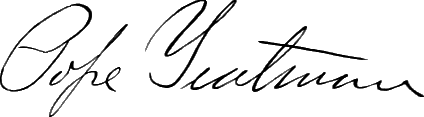

Pope Yeatman (August 3, 1861 – December 5, 1953) was an American mining engineer and consultant. He was known for his work in mining in South Africa, Chile, and Alaska. He was a member of the War Industries Board during World War I.

== Early life ==
Pope Yeatman was born on August 3, 1861, in St. Louis, Missouri. He graduated from Washington University in St. Louis's mining school with an Engineer of Mines (E. M.) degree in 1883. His uncle, James E. Yeatman, was a philanthropist in St. Louis. His first name was derived from the name of his grandfather Nathaniel Pope, an early politician in the Illinois territory. As a boy, he lived in New Haven, Connecticut, and with relatives on a ranch in Wyoming.

== Career ==
After graduating, Yeatman worked in mines in Missouri, New Mexico, Colorado and Mexico. From August 1895 to 1899, he worked in South Africa as an assistant consulting engineer for the Consolidated Gold Fields Company and then was manager of the Robinson Deep gold mine. In 1896, he moved from Lydenburg to Johannesburg. From April to August 1899, he worked as the general manager at the Simmer and Jack mine. He then became general manager and consulting engineer with Randfontein Estates Gold Mining Company in Transvaal. While there, he was an officer of the volunteer mine guard.

In June 1904, Yeatman returned to the United States and worked as the chief consulting engineer for M. Guggenheim & Sons (later the Exploration Company). By 1906, he had succeeded John Hays Hammond in his consulting role with the Guggenheims. His first management activities in copper were with the Nevada Consolidated Copper Company, which included the Cumberland–Ely Mines, the Steptoe Valley & Smelting Company and the Nevada Northern Railway. He was succeeded by Daniel C. Jackling in the role in 1915. Around 1909, he became responsible for operations at the El Teniente mine in Chile. He negotiated the first flotation contract between Braden Copper Company and Minerals Separation, Limited. He examined the Chuquicamata copper mine, property of Chile Copper Company, in Chile for the Guggenheims. In the summers of 1906 and 1909, he did investigative work in Alaska that purportedly led to the Alaska Syndicate, connecting the Guggenheims with J. P. Morgan. He became a consulting engineer with the Yukon Gold Company. He also did investigate work in China and other parts of the world. In 1914, Yeatman lived in Philadelphia but commuted daily to New York City. His salary at that time was over US$100,000 a year.

During World War I, he was a member of the War Industries Board. He replaced Eugene Meyer as head of the non-ferrous metals division in 1918. During this period, he worked in Washington, D.C.

In March 1918, Yeatman was awarded the gold medal from the Mining and Metallurgical Society of America. In 1923, he was awarded the Distinguished Service Medal by the War Department for his contributions during World War I.

== Personal life ==
Yeatman married Georgie Claiborne Watkins, daughter of Judge Claiborne Watkins, of Little Rock, Arkansas, on June 26, 1894. They had two daughters and a son: Mrs. Ernest C. Savage, Georgiana, Pope Jr. His wife was involved in restoring Robert E. Lee's Stratford on the Potomac home and was president of the Robert E. Lee Memorial Foundation. She died in 1941. They lived at 1118 Spruce Street in Philadelphia. They later lived at "Five Gables" in Chestnut Hill, Philadelphia, and they had a "Chislehurst" summer home in East Jaffrey, New Hampshire.

Yeatman died on December 5, 1953, aged 92, at his home in Chestnut Hill.
