= Evelyn Mary Macdonald =

British occupational therapist (1905–1993)

- Born: 1 June 1905; São Paulo, Brazil
- Died: 20 November 1993 (aged 88); Battle, England
- Occupation: Occupational therapist

Evelyn Mary Macdonald MBE (1 June 1905 in São Paulo, Brazil – 20 November 1993 in Battle, East Sussex) was a British occupational therapist who helped establish occupational therapy in the United Kingdom, Argentina and Greece. She founded the Association of Occupational Therapists. Miss Macdonald was Principal of Dorset House, the oldest and largest School in Great Britain for 33 years. She was an appointed member of the Cope Committee which led to the statutory regulation of the Professions Supplementary to Medicine in 1960. Macdonald was the first Chair of the Occupational Therapists Board. She was an author, an early advocate of cooperation between the allied health professions and a historian of the Association.

== Early life and education ==
Evelyn Mary Macdonald was one of six children of Ebenezer John Macdonald (1870–1926) and Evelyn May Macdonald, nee Savory (1872–1968). Her mother, Evelyn May Savory was the eldest daughter of Reverend Ernest Lloyd Savory, Rector of Palgrave in Suffolk. Ebenezer John Macdonald was the third son of Charles Macdonald, Esq. of Greenock. Her father was born in Buenos Aires, Argentina and was a merchant. Her parents married on New Year's Day 1903 at St Paul's Church, Sao Paulo.

Little is known about Evelyn Mary Macdonald's early life in Brazil. She and her twin brother Robert Angus Macdonald (1905–1984) were born on June 1, 1905. They had four brothers: Ernest Charles Ian Macdonald (1904–1998), Ronald Campbell Macdonald (1908–2001), Norman Pemberton Macdonald (1913–1992) and Roderick Houston Macdonald (1918–1942). In 1921, sixteen-year-old Evelyn Mary was a boarder at Southlands School in Seaford, East Sussex. Her brothers Robert Angus, Ernest Charles and Ronald Campbell were students at Weymouth College in Dorset.

== Career ==
Macdonald was expected to become a companion to her parents or marry. She did neither. After considerable opposition, she became a craft teacher at Howells School in Wales.

In 1934, Macdonald attended a conference on Occupational Therapy, held in London, to hear Elizabeth Casson. She recalled that Dr Casson gave "an inspiring outline of the fundamentals of the treatment … as a contribution to a realistic way of living." She was accepted at Dorset House School with "craft teaching qualifications (N.S.A.M Craft Teachers' Certificate) and other experience."

=== Dorset House School of Occupational Therapy ===
Macdonald was one of eight students who started occupational therapy training at Dorset House School, Clifton, Bristol in September 1934. She "had followed the development of occupational therapy with interest for a number of years and had covered much of the syllabus before she came."

The School was in Dorset House, a private residential clinic for patients suffering from neurotic and psychotic conditions, established by Casson in 1929. Dr Casson opened the School in 1930. It was the first School of Occupational Therapy in the United Kingdom. Alice Constance Owens, nee Tebbit (1906–1976), the first English woman to qualify as an Occupational Therapist, was the first Principal. Dr Casson described Macdonald as "one of the Schools most talented students."

Between March and June 1938, Macdonald went on a study tour of occupational therapy services in America and Canada, funded by a grant from the Pilgrim and York Trusts. She visited the Schools in Philadelphia, Toronto, Milwaukee and Boston; 44 hospitals, clinics, special schools and rehabilitation centres and met Dr William Rush Dunton Jr, co-founder of National Society for the Promotion of Occupational Therapy in 1917.

In 1938 Macdonald was appointed Principal. Macdonald was responsible for the school with 18 students and supervised patients' occupational therapy treatment at Dorset House and nearby hospitals. She planned and opened the Allendale Curative Workshop for outpatients with physical disabilities in 1939. Macdonald described this demonstration treatment unit as an "adventure in rehabilitation."

Dr Casson described Macdonald as showing a "genius for administration." In 1941, Dorset House had to relocate due to the bombing of Bristol. The patients moved to other facilities and the School went to Barnsley Hall Emergency Hospital, at Bromsgrove, Worcestershire. Casson described this as "a very arduous period of uncertainty" until the "Ministry of Health borrowed the School for the war period." They wanted to rapidly increase the number of occupational therapists able to implement wartime rehabilitation programmes.

In response, Dorset House provided six month courses subsidised by the Ministry of Health. The War Emergency Diploma Course was for physiotherapists and nurses; the 1943 Certificate Course for others with suitable qualifications and experience; and an Auxiliary Course for younger candidates prepared to work under supervision by an occupational therapist. Macdonald was responsible for allocating candidates to hospitals where the Ministry of Health required training staff. She advised and helped to open new departments. Over 200 people completed a six month course, alongside the three-year Diploma. This was a similar number to those who trained between 1930 and 1945.

The Dorset House staff led by Griselda MacCaul (1908–1996), set up "a curative workshop" at Barnsley Hall Emergency Hospital. The workshop became a model for occupational therapy in other Emergency Medical Service Hospitals in the United Kingdom.

On 29 June 1942, Macdonald's youngest brother, Lieutenant Roderick Houston Macdonald, of the Royal Horse Artillery, died. His service is commemorated at El Alamein Way War Cemetery in Egypt.

At the end of World War 2, Barnsley Hall Emergency Hospital closed and Dorset House moved again. Macdonald negotiated the tenancy of 18 Nissen huts in the grounds of Churchill Hospital, Oxford. She was described as "never happier than when planning" – the relocation, adapting the students' training until their accommodation at Haberton House in Headington, was ready.

In July 1948, Dorset House School became a non-profit-making limited company. Dr Casson remained as Medical Director and Vice Chair of the Governors. She created the Casson Trust in 1949 to support occupational therapy education, practice and research. Macdonald was one of four Trustees. In February 1972 she raised a proposal from the Association of Occupational Therapists, that the Trust fund a "high calibre" lecture at the Annual Conference. A year later, the inaugural Casson Memorial Lecture was given by Sir George Godber, Chief Medical Officer for England. The 50th Casson Lecture was held in 2023. Macdonald served as a Trustee of the Casson Trust until 1981, when she retired due to ill-health.

Macdonald and her Deputy, Betty Collins, began searching for permanent accommodation for the School in the mid 1950s. She was concerned that prospective students would be deterred by cold, leaky Nissen huts "however good the training offered." Macdonald "would sweep imperiously through such (potential) buildings, planning the School as she went." Hillstow in Headington was selected. A campaign to raise £50,000 to buy and renovate the house was started. Mr Hubert D. Savory, a relative of Macdonald on her mother's side, donated a sum specifically for the library. Dorset House moved to its first permanent accommodation in the autumn of 1964. Macdonald wore her B.Litt (Oxon) Cap and Gown at the official opening by H.R.H The Princess Marina of Kent on 9 July 1965 In the 1960s Macdonald influenced the national curriculum set by the Association of Occupational Therapists. She recommended a new, practical subject: Activities of Daily Living. The 1968 revised syllabus included the assessment and re-training of daily living skills. These skills were taught at Dorset House: students practiced in the Peto Rehabilitation Unit and in the community. Macdonald also initiated discussions with local higher education institutions about updating the course from a Diploma to a Degree.

There are a few anecdotes about Macdonald, or Mac as she was known. A Dorset House student remembered that "she lived in the school in a bed sitting room …She had a little wooden toy; if it faced the wall you knew you were in trouble. She had this sense of humour without saying anything." A mature student was surprised at the reaction to her forthcoming marriage. She was interviewed by Macdonald and her deputy and given permission on "the condition that my future husband did not ‘darken the door of Dorset House' Miss Macdonald always considered that her responsibilities were to the students and the profession and was fearful that spouses, however sympathetic, might hinder training." Staff recalled "Mac, who ruled us with a rod of iron and whose humour we only rarely experienced." Macdonald retired in July 1971. She led Dorset House, the oldest and largest School, for 33 years. During this period the annual intake increased from 18 to over 80. The School was established in Oxford where "it was respected … largely due to her dedication, drive and diplomacy in dealing with the ‘town and gown' authorities." New student accommodation, opened in 1971, was named the Mary Macdonald House "to commemorate the Principal who had done so much to get it established". More than 200 guests attended Macdonald's farewell-cum-reunion hosted by the Worshipful Company of Goldsmiths'. She was presented with gifts from the Governors and alumni which "reflected the appreciation of many hundreds of people for her devotion to occupational therapy and to Dorset House through the years."

=== Association of Occupational Therapists ===
Macdonald instigated the Association; acting as the secretary of the first informal committee and convening the first General Meeting where the Association was formed. As a student at Dorset House, she foresaw "the need for a body to guide and set standards for what was to be a rapidly developing profession." In the summer of 1935, she and Miss Plater when walking in the Mendip Hills, mooted a professional association. "They asked Dr Casson ‘Could a professional association be set up for Occupational Therapists?' Dr Casson's reply was characteristically brief and to the point:- ‘It's up to you!'" She arranged a meeting with Dorset House staff and students on 7 August 1935 to consider the proposal and begin planning. The meeting notes record that the remit of an Association of Occupational Therapists "could deal with standards of qualification, syllabuses, uniforms and be of use in discovering openings and recommending trainees to posts etc, etc."

Macdonald was the first secretary of an informal committee of people interested in forming an Association for English, Northern Irish and Welsh occupational therapists. Meetings were held at Dorset House and in Liverpool. She convened the General Meeting, held on 14 March at the London College of Nursing which set up the Association. A Council of 12 members, including Macdonald, were elected to lead the Association.

Throughout her career, Macdonald served on Council and various committees; represented the Association and documented its history. She wrote six articles for the journal, Occupational Therapy to mark the 21st anniversary of the Association. The first was about the start up in 1935–1936. Next, Macdonald reports the work undertaken between 1936 and 1939, including adopting a Constitution; producing an examination syllabus and process to inspect training schools. In 1939, Council discussed the impending war, writing to the Director of Medical Services to register their readiness for action. Macdonald's third paper describes how the Association continued between 1939 and 1942, adapting education standards to meet the demand for rehabilitation staff for the war effort. The fourth paper covers the Emergency Hospital Service; occupational therapists in war centres and starting Schools overseas; regulations for professional practice and formalising the status of the Association as a limited liability company. In the fifth paper Macdonald documents the post war period (1946–1949) which included preparing for the new National Health Service; starting a Library and register of Technical Instructors. Macdonald's final article covered 1950 to 1957 with a new joint Council with the Scottish Association, the formation of the World Federation of Occupational Therapist and Congress in Edinburgh; and work on the state registration of Medical Auxiliaries.

At the 1956 Annual General Meeting of the Association Macdonald was congratulated on the award of a B.Litt (Oxon) from St Anne's College. It was "the first Thesis ever presented to a University, on a subject connected with the work of the profession."

Macdonald was an early advocate of collaboration between therapeutic services or the Allied Health Professions as they are known. She researched the history, compared the education and practice of five therapeutic services: occupational therapy, orthoptics, physiotherapy, remedial gymnastics and speech therapy for the B.Litt. Macdonald reviewed the commonalities and differences in relation to health policies. She argued that they were "somewhat allied … the therapist deals personally and actively with every patient." She examined and costed options for inter-professional education at Institutes; a new position of Hospital or Health Service Aides to support qualified staff; and proposed a voluntary Federation of Supplementary Medical Treatment Services to work strategically "in the interests of their common problems and links."

=== Statutory regulation ===
Macdonald was one of two occupational therapists in Britain appointed to a committee, set up in 1949 by the Minister of Health and the Secretary of State for Scotland. The Occupational Therapy Committee was to consider the supply and demand, training and qualifications of Occupational Therapists in the new National Health Service and to make recommendations. Macdonald and M D Barr were invited because of their special expertise, not as representatives of any organisation. The other four members, including the chairman, Mr Zachary Cope were medical practitioners.

The Cope Report led to state registration enacted in the Professions Supplementary to Medicine (PSM) Act 1960. The Reports of the Committees on Medical Auxiliaries (Ministry of Health/Department of Health for Scotland, 1951) was about almoners, chiropodists, physiotherapists (including remedial gymnasts), dieticians, radiographers, medical laboratory technicians and speech therapists. Questions were asked about the Cope Committee's Reports in the House of Commons on19 April 1951.

State registration includes maintaining registers of qualified people, recognising educational institutions and examinations and dealing with breaches of standards. The functions of the Council for Professions Supplementary Medicine aligned with those of the General Medical Council and the General Nursing Council.

The 1960 PSM Act set up a supervisory Council and seven Boards (almoners and speech therapists withdrew). Macdonald was a member of Council and the first chair of the Occupational Therapists Board. The Board was responsible for setting and monitoring standards to assure the public that State Registered Occupational Therapists were qualified and competent to practise. Her contribution to the Cope Committee and the Council for Professions Supplementary to Medicine "played a significant part in ensuring that the profession was in a position to control its future development."

=== Supporting occupational therapy internationally ===
Macdonald supported the development of occupational therapy in many countries. Dorset House School welcomed overseas visitors who were setting up schools and services. In 1948, she hosted therapists and students from Australia, Czechoslovakia, Germany and Sweden.

Early in 1946 Dr Casson offered the United Nations Relief and Rehabilitation Administration a scholarship to train a Greek candidate in occupational therapy. The recipient was Roula Gregoriaou (1916–1967) a volunteer nurse with the Greek Red Cross during World War 2. Gregoriaou qualified in 1949. She set up a training course and an occupational therapy service at the Asclepeeon Voulas Orthopaedic Hospital in Athens. Macdonald described Gregoriaou as a pioneer who "demonstrated what contribution occupational therapy could make to the needs of the disabled, but administered and extended the work at the same time." She received, on behalf of the School, the "honorary distinction" the Golden Cross of the Greek Red Cross. Macdonald is recognised as a founder of occupational therapy in Argentina. In 1957 she was asked by the Argentinian government to set up a training School. This followed a nine month secondment by Betty Hollins and a group of physiotherapists, to establish a rehabilitation service for the poliomyelitis epidemic. In March 1959 Macdonald led three experienced occupational therapists: Hilary Schlesinger, Barbara Allen and Anne Rickett to Argentina. Macdonald wrote about the challenges of meeting the contractual obligations. These were to open a training school, continue and expand the treatment work in the physical field, and open and expand work in the psychological field. She highlighted the responsibilities of ‘exporting a profession' offering the trip to Argentine as "a prototype of a service we should, from these isles, be prepared to increasingly render." Macdonald is remembered for instilling the first Argentinian students with their responsibilities as pioneers, which included supporting training, the dissemination of occupational therapy throughout the country and organising a professional association.

In 1971 Macdonald and Doris Sym, Principal of the Glasgow School, were advisors to a new School in Northern Ireland. This was during The Troubles. On one visit, "as Macdonald was speaking, a bomb exploded in the distance. She did not appear to bat an eyelid." The Ulster School opened in September 1973 at the Ulster Polytechnic, Jordanstown.

== Publications ==
Macdonald wrote articles, was a co-author and co-editor of textbooks. In 1938 ‘Bookbinding and Bookcraft in Occupational Therapy' was published in the first issue of the Association's Journal. An article about ‘Occupational Therapy in Mental Health' published in the British Medical Bulletin in 1949, was reprinted in Occupational Therapy. She was a co-author of the first textbook written by a British occupational therapist. ‘The Theory of Occupational Therapy for Students and Nurses', written with Norah A. Haworth, a physician, was published in 1940 and 1944. It received positive reviews.

Between 1960 and 1981 Macdonald co-edited four editions of ‘Occupational Therapy in Rehabilitation: A Handbook for Occupational Therapists, Students and Others Interested in this Aspect of Reablement'. Each edition had contributions from specialist occupational therapists. This was a popular textbook. A book review for the 4th Edition called it the ‘bible for OTs.'

In 1981, Baillière Tindall, London published ‘'World-wide Conquests of Disabilities: The History, Development and Present Functions of the Remedial Services.' Macdonald did the research a"nd writing in her retirement, visiting and corresponding with therapists all over the world.

== Death and legacy ==
Evelyn Mary Macdonald died on 20 November 1993, aged 88. In her will, dated 8 February 1980, she bequeathed £2,000 to the Casson Trust, asking that part be invested for a student or post-graduate student scholarship. She specified that her body be "interred in narrow grave (with a fresh headstone) … on the right hand side of that of my late Mother ...in the Churchyard of St. John the Baptist's Church at Windlesham, Surrey. Her headstone simply says ‘A pioneer in occupational therapy'.

Her legacy is the Association of Occupational Therapists which became the British Association of Occupational Therapists in 1974 and the Royal College of Occupational Therapists in 2017. Also, statutory regulation through the Professions Supplementary to Medicine Act 1960 which continues with the Health Professions Order 2001 and the Health and Care Professions Council

An obituary described Macdonald as "one of the great pioneers of occupational therapy … her contribution to the wellbeing of countless people in the field of rehabilitation will ensure that her influence will live on."

There is a collection of her papers in the Dorset House Archives held at Oxford Brookes University. These include a scrapbook which contains letters from the Ministry of Health acknowledging Macdonald's contribution to the Emergency Services during World War 2 and from the Commisión Nacional de Rehabilitatacion de Lisido for founding the first School of Occupational Therapy in Argentina.

== Awards and honours ==
In 1964 Macdonald was awarded an MBE for her services to rehabilitation. She was awarded a Fellowship of the World Federation of Occupational Therapists in 1970 and a Fellowship of the College of Occupational Therapists in 1972.
