= Lynn McDonald (academic) =

Canadian academic

Lynn McDonald is a professor in the Faculty of Social Work and Director of the Institute for Life Course and Aging at the University of Toronto and Scientific Director of the National Initiative for the Care of the Elderly.

== Education ==
Dr. McDonald holds Bachelors and Masters degrees from the University of Manitoba; she gained her PhD in Sociology from the University of Calgary.

== Career ==
Her research interests include work and retirement, violence against women and older adults, poverty and the homelessness and ethnicity and aging. She has been a board director of the Alberta and Canadian Associations of Gerontology and served as Editor, Policy and Practice and Acting Editor, Social Sciences for the Canadian Journal on Aging; she also has been a board director of the Social Sciences and Humanities Research Council of Canada.

Currently, McDonald is a member of the Board of Accreditation of the Canadian Association of the Schools of Social Work, the Social Dimensions of Aging Committee for the Canadian Institutes of Health Research and is a member of the planning committee for the new Canadian Longitudinal Study on Aging. She is a member of the Expert Advisory Committee for the Report Card on Seniors 2006, published by the National Advisory Council on Aging. She is also a member of the Working Group for the Panel Study of Life Course Dynamics housed in Quebec.

Dr. McDonald has held numerous grants from Health Canada, the former HRDC, from SSHRCC, MCRI CIHR, Population Health, and the National Directorate on the Homeless. She is a co-author of a major Canadian textbook, Aging in Contemporary Canada (2003) and has published numerous articles and technical reports on aging.
