= Boston School of Occupational Therapy =

Occupational therapy school associated with Tufts University

The Boston School of Occupational Therapy (BSOT) is an American college offering academic degree programs in occupational therapy. Now formally known as the Tufts University Department of Occupational Therapy, but often still referred to as Tufts University – Boston School of Occupational Therapy, it exists within the Tufts University Graduate School of Arts and Sciences and offers graduate degrees. The Boston School of Occupational Therapy was founded in 1918 during World War I at the request of William C. Gorgas, the Surgeon General of the United States Army, and became affiliated to Tufts University in 1945. It is one of the top-ranked occupational therapy programs in the nation.

Unlike most of Tufts University, which is located in Medford, Massachusetts, the school was long located in Boston. However it moved to the Tufts campus area in 1982.

== History ==
=== Origins during World War I ===
The involvement of America in World War I led to a need for what were called "reconstruction aides", civilian women who were sent to France to provide occupational therapy services for wounded soldiers, and in order to train these medical personnel, a number of emergency courses, programs, and schools were set up in the United States. The Boston School of Occupational Therapy was one of these, that was founded in 1918 at the request of William C. Gorgas, the Surgeon General of the United States Army, with the main goal to provide a supply of trained occupational therapists to U.S. military hospitals.

A committee of local personages established the school and developed a twelve-week curriculum. According to some sources, it was the second such school created in the United States, following one at Columbia University in New York, while other sources have referred to it as the oldest school.The school itself refers to itself as the oldest. The initiative relied upon a cooperative effort among Boston-area hospitals.

Registration for the school began on April 22, 1918, and the first classes began on April 24. There were 34 women registered as students, with most of them being college graduates. The initial dean of the school was Sarah M. Lake, who had been a teacher at Miss Winsor's School in Boston.

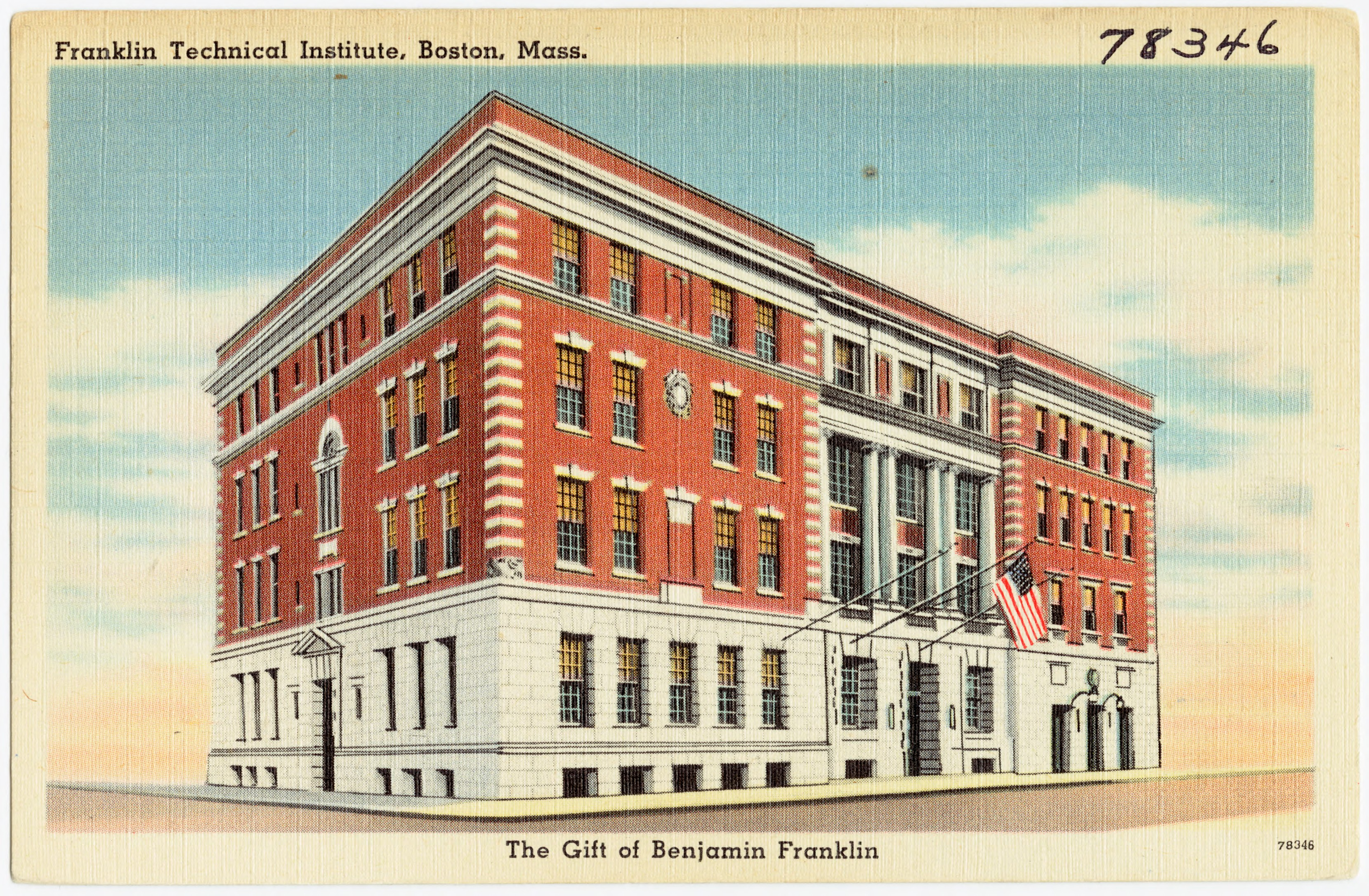
The Franklin Union Building, later known as the Franklin Technical Institute, was the initial home of the Boston School of Occupational Therapy

Sessions were held in two large rooms of the Franklin Union Building, located at the corner of Berkeley and Appleton Streets in the South End neighborhood of Boston. Study involved learning how basket weaving, bookbinding, crocheting, knitting, wood carving, woodblock printing, and similar kinds of handiwork could be used to treat soldiers dealing with physical or mental injuries. Demand for their services was such that of the thirty-one women of the first graduating class in July 1918, six could not be present for the ceremony because they were already deployed in France.

As to who the students were, a description in The Boston Post of the third graduating group in January 1919 said, "The class numbered 33 young women, most of them Boston society girls with a sprinkling of young society matrons."

Over the course of a year, 123 women completed the program and went on to serve in military hospitals, where they were uniformed members of the Army Medical Service.

=== Re-establishment afterwards ===
With the war's emergency needs having passed, the Boston school closed around April 1919, federal funding for it having evaporated. However, the value and need of occupational therapy for the civilian population was recognized; a campaign was begun to raise funds to allow the school to be reopened, with occupational therapy being billed as "a unique and absorbing profession for young women". Most of the funds came from the Boston medical community. The school reopened in Fall 1919, with Ruth Wigglesworth and Marjorie Belle Green as its directors. The program's course was lengthened to a full year, which consisted of nine months of study in various subjects and three months of supervised experience in settlement houses and other locations. It was organized on a permanent basis as a private corporation, which included in 1921 being restructured as a voluntary institution. It was located on Harcourt Street in the Back Bay area of Boston. The idea of the school was supported by a couple of prominent medical figures, the physician Paul Dudley White and the psychologist George S. Klein. By 1924, there were 21 women enrolled in the school, and students were readily finding employment once graduated.

Most of the other emergency schools that had opened during the war had disappeared, but those that carried on afterward included the Philadelphia School of Occupational Therapy, the St. Louis School of Occupational Therapy, and a noted occupational therapy specialization at Milwaukee-Downer College. Together with the Boston School, these institutions would form the beginnings of an "old guard" that provided the basis for much of the development of the occupational therapy field.

During the 1923–24 period, Ruth Wigglesworth left the school, and Marjorie Belle Green became the school's sole leader. After her marriage in 1932, the latter was often referred to as Mrs. John A. Greene, but among the students and staff at the school she was known simply as "MBG". Under a variety of titles, including director and president, she remained in charge of the school for decades.

By 1938, the course of study had lengthened to eighteen months, and some 400 students had graduated from the school during its history. The Boston School of Occupational Therapy was the only such school accredited in New England.

=== Association with Tufts ===
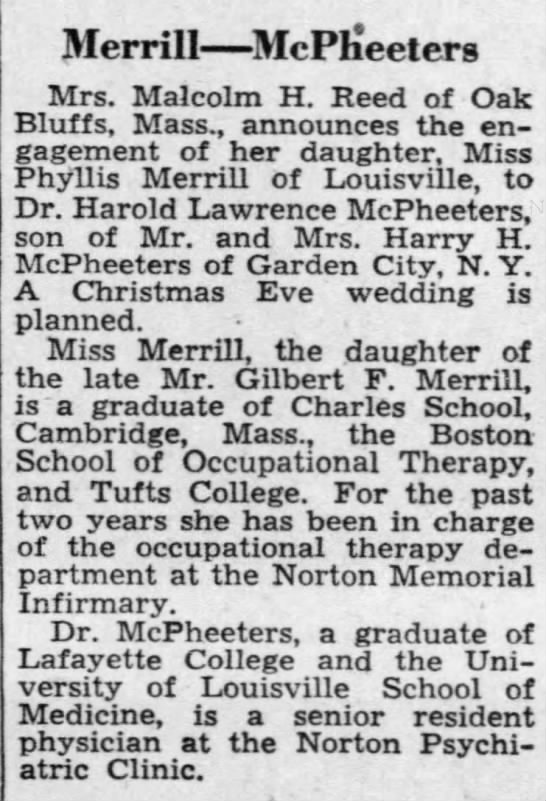
Mention of graduation from the Boston School of Occupational Therapy was common in the bride's biography within engagement notices, such as in this 1951 one

The advent of World War II once again saw an increase in need for occupational therapists, such that the U.S. Army Surgeon General ordered an expansion of all existing occupational therapy training arrangements. The Boston School responded by making available accelerated courses. Graduates of the school were active during the war, such as being sent to the occupational therapy department of Queen's Hospital in Honolulu in the Territory of Hawaii. Others were working in Army hospitals at various overseas locations, while some went to Navy facilities. Still others were being employed as teachers for the next set of therapists. By the final year of the war, there were around 40 students in the school.

In May 1945, it was announced that the Boston School of Occupational Therapy was becoming affiliated with Medford, Massachusetts-based Tufts College. The arrangement was done via the college's Division of University Extension (subsequently known as the Division of Special Studies). Students would be able to earn a Bachelor of Science degree in education while taking occupational therapy courses at the school and doing clinical work at associated hospitals. The association followed a pattern previously established when a different professional school, the Bouvé-Boston School of Physical Education, became linked to Tufts in 1942.

The affiliation took place as planned in September 1945. Students would take academic courses at the main Tufts campus in Medford, which would included study in biology, education, psychology, and sociology, and take professional classes at the Harcourt Street site in Boston, where topics being taught included anatomy, kinesiology, neurology, orthopedics, pathology, and psychiatry. The program typically took five years; it included a year of clinical experience, which typically was done in the Boston area, although it did not have to be.

Students may have lived at the Franklin Square House in Boston's South End, which was well-known for housing single women students and professionals. Beginning in the 1946–47 year, the school's students began living in a dormitory in Medford and commuted into Boston for their occupational therapy classes. Nonetheless, both their living quarters and their academic classes were largely separate from the rest of the students at Jackson College for Women, where regular female Tufts students were, and during this period there was little interaction between them.

Marjorie Belle Greene continued in charge of the school until her retirement in 1960. She said there had been some 1,200 graduates of the school during her time there.

=== Merger with Tufts ===
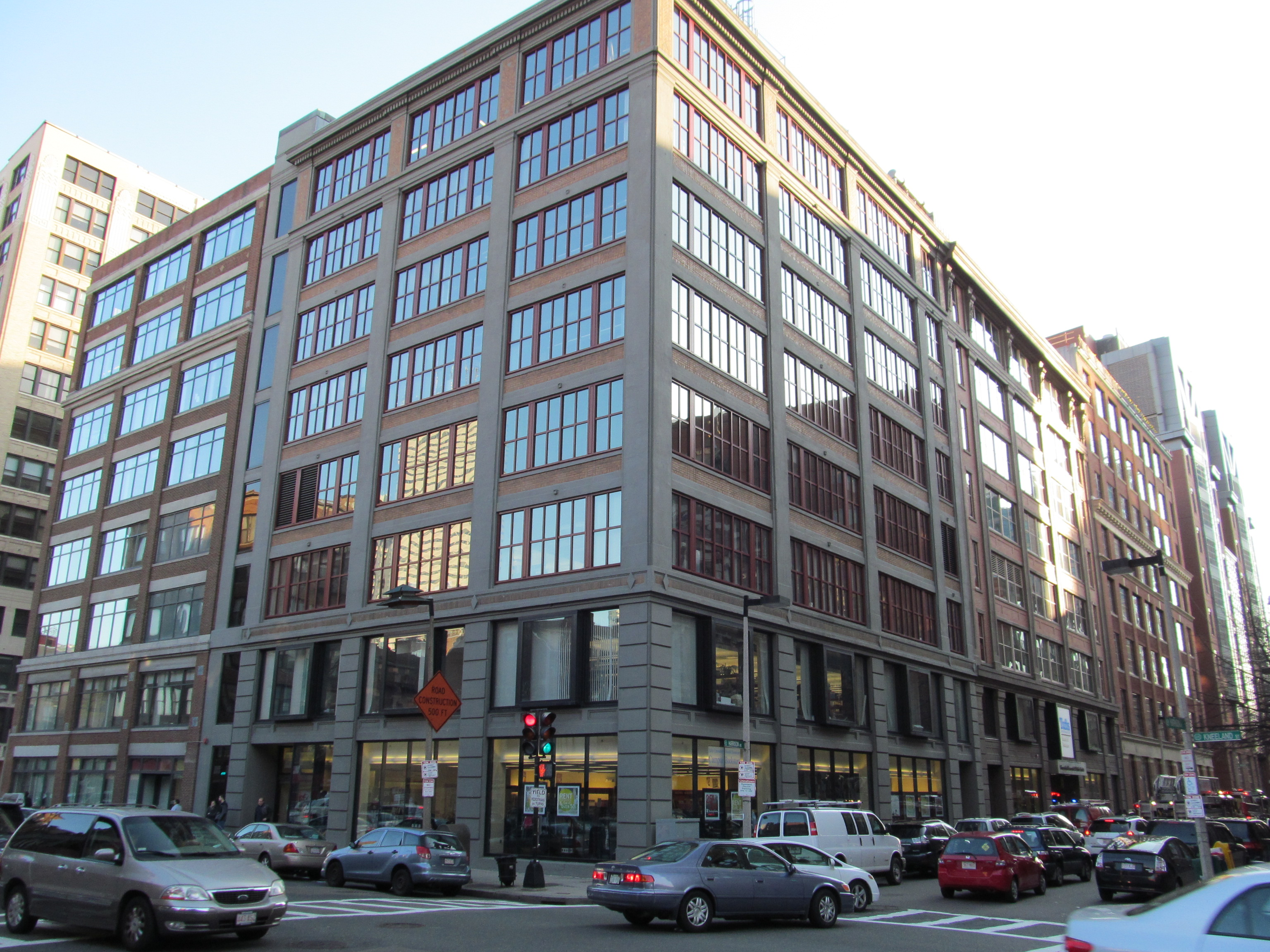
The Boston School of Occupational Therapy moved to the Tufts–New England Medical Center campus in 1962.

In 1960, it was announced that the school would be merging with Tufts University, with its buildings, equipment, and other assets being taken over by Tufts. The merger had been two years in the making. The new entity was known as Tufts University–Boston School of Occupational Therapy (TU-BSOT), although many still referred to it as just the Boston School of Occupational Therapy. Organizationally, the school existed as the Department of Occupational Therapy within the College of Special Studies at Tufts. The school was headed by Veronica C. Dobranske.

Later in 1960, a project was begun to expand the Tufts Medical School campus, which plans included moving in the classrooms of the Boston School of Occupational Therapy. This change took place in 1962, with the school moving to the Medical Residents' Building on Harrison Avenue, in the Chinatown neighborhood of Boston. This was also known as the New England Medical Center's Stearns Building, where the occupational therapy program took up two floors.

The Boston School of Occupational Therapy was influential, in that by the early 1960s there were some thirty other schools around the nation that were modeled on its approach and some of which had directors who were alumnae of the Boston School. And there was long an "old girls' network" within occupational therapy, in which women would use mentorship and professional networking in order advance one another within the field; much of this networking came from connections first formed in the aforementioned old guard of long-established occupational therapy schools, with the Boston School of Occupational Therapy being seen as the most important of these.

Instead of getting a Bachelor of Science in Education, students could choose to get the more explicitly professional Bachelor of Science in Occupational Therapy.

Accreditation of the school came from the American Medical Association and the American Occupational Therapy Association.

The merger produced an immediate surge in the number of occupational therapy students: whereas there had been 8 new students in 1959, there were 27 new ones in 1960, and by the 1962–63 year, there were 80 students enrolled in the school overall. The school was attracting students from overseas as well. TU-BSOT was officially coeducational, but during the 1960s male occupational therapy students were still quite rare. Instead of living in dedicated dormitories, during the 1960s students began being mixed into dormitories for Jackson College students. Students still had to commute into Boston for their occupational therapy classes, which typically required taking a special bus to an MBTA train. There was a clinical internship requirement of nine months' duration, which was taken from the summer after the junior year through the midpoint of the senior year, thus allowing graduation in four years instead of four years and nine months as in some other schools. Subsequently this requirement would be lessened to six months.

Beginning in 1978, the school offered graduate-level programs. Not only was the school in Boston, with both a undergraduate and graduate program, but so were the Tufts Medical School and the Tufts Dental School. While Tufts was not the size of the nation's large research universities, it was still subject to the same kind of silo mentality that effectively geographical and academically distinct units such as BSOT.

=== Leaving Boston and closer integration with Tufts ===
In 1982, the Boston School of Occupational Therapy became a school within the Tufts University College of Arts and Sciences. The school left Boston completely in 1982, moving to leased space in the Conwell School building in Somerville, Massachusetts, bordering on Medford.

A decision was made around 1986 to phase out the undergraduate degree program over the next four years, instead focusing solely on graduate-level degrees.

The city of Somerville decided in 1986 that it needed the Conwell School building back, putting the Occupational Therapy at risk of being homeless and possibly even shutting down. However, Tufts acquired the house of the Alpha Epsilon Pi fraternity in Medford and, after renovating it, moved the occupational therapy school to it in 1988.

Progress with patients in occupational therapy is often slow; an official in 1988 described a typical student of the school as "a good listener, responsive, compassionate; they seem to tolerate frustration well."

In 1989, Tufts added an early intervention concentration to its masters program, to address the needs of children with disabilities under age 3. They were the only school in New England to have such an offering.

In 2006, the school got the largest donation in its long history when Boston billionaire Joshua Bekenstein and his wife Anita funded annual scholarships for occupation therapy students needing financial aid.

From 2001 through 2011, the alumni newsletter for the school was known as Tufts BSOT Notes.

== Rankings ==
The Boston School of Occupational Therapy was ranked 6th in the nation in 2016, according to the U.S. News & World Report's Best Occupational Therapy Programs.

In 2025, the same publication ranked the school in a tie for 9th out of 282 programs across the country.

== Boston Morning Musicales ==
Beginning in 1928, fundraising for the school included a series of six concerts each year from the Boston Morning Musicales. These were society events, held in the large ballroom of the Statler Hotel Boston, that featured hundreds of guests who were given morning coffee. Besides enjoying classical music performances, women came to the events in order to be seen in the latest fashions. The waiting list for subscriptions to the Boston Morning Musicales was a couple of years long, and in some cases subscriptions were handed down from mother to daughter. The Boston Morning Musicales events on behalf of the school continued on even after the affiliation with Tufts University was formed. In 1968, the Boston Morning Musicales moved to the Copley Plaza and was reduced to a four concert series.

In the earlier years, the Morning Musicales attracted many top performers of the day, the pianists Sergei Rachmaninoff and Arthur Rubinstein, the violinist Fritz Kreisler, and the singers Feodor Chaliapin, Lotte Lehmann, and Kirsten Flagstad. In 1943, during the Second World War, the featured artist was the groundbreaking vocalist Marian Anderson. In later years there were not as many big names, but appearances did occur by the singers Beverly Sills, Jessye Norman, and Kathleen Battle. Over time, the increase of women in the workforce meant fewer were available to attend mid-morning events such as these, and the costs of staging the events rose as well. After 62 seasons and 319 concerts, the Boston Morning Musicales came to an end in March 1990.
