= Australian Occupational Therapy Journal =

- Discipline: Occupational therapy
- Language: English
- Edited by: Louise Gustafsson

Publication details
- Former name: Bulletin of the Australian Association of Occupational Therapists
- History: 1952-present
- Publisher: Wiley-Blackwell on behalf of the Occupational Therapy Australia (Australia)
- Frequency: Bimonthly
- Impact factor: 1.8 (2022)

Standard abbreviations
- ISO 4: Aust. Occup. Ther. J.

Indexing
- ISSN: 0045-0766 (print); 1440-1630 (web)
- OCLC no.: 863227532

Links
- Journal homepage; Online access; Online archive

The Australian Occupational Therapy Journal is a bimonthly international peer-reviewed medical journal presenting scholarship and research relevant to occupational therapy. It was established in 1952 as the Bulletin of the Australian Association of Occupational Therapists, obtaining its current title in 1963. The journal is published by Wiley-Blackwell. The journal is the official research publication of the professional peak body, Occupational Therapy Australia.

== Editors ==
The current editor-in-chief (since 2020) is Louise Gustafsson (Griffith University).

== Abstracting and indexing ==
The journal is abstracted and indexed in:

- CINAHL
- EBSCO databases
- Index Medicus/MEDLINE/PubMed
- ProQuest databases
- PsycINFO/Psychological Abstracts
- Science Citation Index Expanded
- Scopus

According to the Journal Citation Reports, the journal has a 2022 impact factor of 1.8.
