= Elizabeth Casson =

British doctor

- Elizabeth Casson in 1902
- Born: 14 April 1881; Denbigh, Wales
- Died: 17 December 1954 (aged 73); Bristol, England
- Resting place: Backwell churchyard, Somerset
- Occupation: Psychiatrist
- Known for: Founding Dorset House

Elizabeth Casson OBE (14 April 1881 – 17 December 1954) was a British medical doctor and an occupational therapy pioneer. Initially training as a secretary, Casson began studying medicine at the University of Bristol when she was 32. She received her medical degree in 1926, becoming the first woman to receive one from the University of Bristol. She also attained the Gaskell prize from the Royal Medico-Psychological Association and a diploma in psychological medicine from the University of London.

Casson set up a residential clinic for women with mental disorders at Dorset House in Bristol in 1929 with enough residential space for 800 patients, and she opened the first school of occupational therapy in the UK in the same building the following year. She took an active role in the therapeutic activities at Dorset House, even playing a part in the patients' production of Pride and Prejudice.

Casson moved control of the school to a non-profit company in 1948, remaining as vice-chairman and medical director. She created the Elizabeth Casson Trust in 1949, intended to improve occupation therapy education and treatment. In 1951, Casson was appointed an OBE for her work at Dorset House and was also made an honorary fellow of the World Federation of Occupational Therapists. A memorial lecture was set up in her name in 1973 with presenters being selected by their peers, and a psychiatric unit was named after her at Bristol's Callington Road Hospital.

== Biography ==
Casson, known as Elsie, was born on 14 April 1881 in Denbigh, Wales. She was the sixth child of a bank manager and amateur organ-builder, Thomas Casson, from Wales, and his wife Laura Ann. One of her brothers, Lewis Casson, went on to be an actor and theatre director. Whilst living in Denbigh, the family encouraged the seven children to enjoy the arts.

In 1891, Thomas decided to set up a business in organ-building and the family moved to London. There, Casson was educated at St Mary's College, Paddington before going to secretarial college at her father's behest. After qualifying, she worked as a secretary for her fathers' organ-building business until his retirement. In 1908, Casson was a working as housing manager for the social reformer, Octavia Hill, taking care of the living conditions of residents at Red Cross Hall in Southwark. For the next five years she organised recreational activities at the hall, focusing on the arts. Octavia Hill's philosophy influenced Casson's work over the following years.

In 1911, Casson's uncle, Isambard Owen, vice-chancellor at University of Bristol, promised her a place studying medicine if she could be formally matriculated to the university. She struggled with her Latin exams for two years, but eventually passed them and registered to study medicine on 1 October 1913 at the age of 32. She graduated with her Bachelor of Medicine degree in 1919, and took on a role at the West Hertfordshire Hospital in Hemel Hempstead. There she noticed that patients in the women's wards were enjoying using artistic talents, and decided that such pursuits were important to treatment. She realised that these pursuits were not only keeping the patients occupied but also helping them to gain self-esteem and to work through their issues.

Casson became a medical officer at the Holloway Sanatorium in 1921, developing an interest in occupational therapy whilst working there until 1929. In that time she gained a diploma in psychological medicine from the University of London in 1922, achieved her Doctorate of Medicine from the University of Bristol in 1926 (becoming the first woman to do so), and winning the 1927 Gaskell prize from the Royal Medico-Psychological Association. She also helped set up the Standing Committee in Psychological Medicine of the Medical Women's Federation and the Gaskell club for those recipients of the prize.

== Dorset House ==
"When I first qualified as a doctor I decided that I would take up psychological medicine, and went to one of the best mental hospitals as a clinical assistant ... Then, one Monday morning, when I arrived at the women's wards I found the atmosphere had completely changed and realized that preparations for Christmas decorations had begun and all patients were working happily in groups ... I knew from that moment that occupation was an integral part of treatment and must be provided.'"

— Casson in a brochure for Dorset House School in 1930

In 1926, Casson visited an occupational therapy centre in Bloomingdale Hospital, New York City, whilst on holiday, and decided that the UK needed a similar facility; in the late 1920s, Casson decided to establish one. She borrowed £1000 (equivalent to £38,644 in 2025) from her brother, Lewis, to help set up the occupational therapy centre. Dorset House opened in Clifton, Bristol, in 1929 as a residential centre for women with mental health issues. She expanded Dorset House and on 1 January 1930 the UK's first occupational therapy school, known as Dorset House School of Occupational Therapy opened, and she became medical director herself. Miss Constance Tebbit (Alice Constance Owens) was the first Principal. The school's course would teach not only the medical subjects such as anatomy and physiology, but also occupational treatments such as weaving, bookbinding, and other crafts, as well as how to organise activities such as country dancing and how these activities applied to occupational therapy. Ciné films of these activities can be found at the Dorset House archive held by Oxford Brookes University library.

Casson's vision for Dorset House was that of a 'community where every individual was encouraged to feel that she had a real object'. Having seen the benefit, in the United States and at Octavia Hill, she combined medical interventions with education and recreational approaches. She actively involved herself in the daily therapeutic activities, often inspired by her artistic childhood and build closer relationships between patients and staff, creating a community feel. At one point she even cast herself in Dorset House's drama production, playing Mr. William Collins in their 1934 rendition of Pride and Prejudice.

Days would be structured so that activities would be planned throughout, with occupational therapy carrying on into evenings and at weekends. A typical day would include breakfast then flower arranging until 10:30, followed by an hour in the occupation room for therapy. After their work, the patients would go for a walk or join in community singing until 2pm. Between 2pm and 8pm there would be more time in the occupation room, a period of rest and time in the garden. At 8 pm there would be community games and country dancing. Casson believed it was important to keep the therapy room separate from the rest of the department, as it was specialised knowledge. She also insisted that certain activities, such as knitting, were not used as it was not sufficient distraction from the patient's fantasy system. Some concern existed that patients would not accept being put to work, but of her 100 patients in 1931, only six refused the therapy. A member (and later fellow) of the British Homeopathy Society, Casson also included homeopathic treatments in her programme for the patients.

Dorset House Clinic had space for 800 patients in residence during the 1930s. In 1938 Dr Casson appointed Miss Evelyn Mary Macdonald, a former student, as Principal of Dorset House School, a post she held for 33 years. The School moved to Bromsgrove during World War II. The building was damaged during the war, so in 1946, the School of Occupational Therapy moved to Oxford, whilst the patients moved to Clevedon. To ensure costs were kept down for the patients, Casson subsidised their treatment from her own funds. She began to release control of the projects in 1948, first by passing the school to a nonprofit company with her as vice-president and remaining as medical director. Then, in 1949, Casson created the Elizabeth Casson Trust which focused on occupational therapy treatment and education, with the majority of funds going to Dorset House school. In 1992, the school became part of Oxford Brookes University; the Elizabeth Casson Trust continues to support occupational therapists in professional development activities, service development and leadership.

== Societies ==
"It is ridiculous to send all girls into offices, where they have nothing to do in their spare time but powder their noses and where their maternal instincts and ideals of social service can find no outlet'"

— Casson, speaking at the West Of England Nursing Conference in 1932

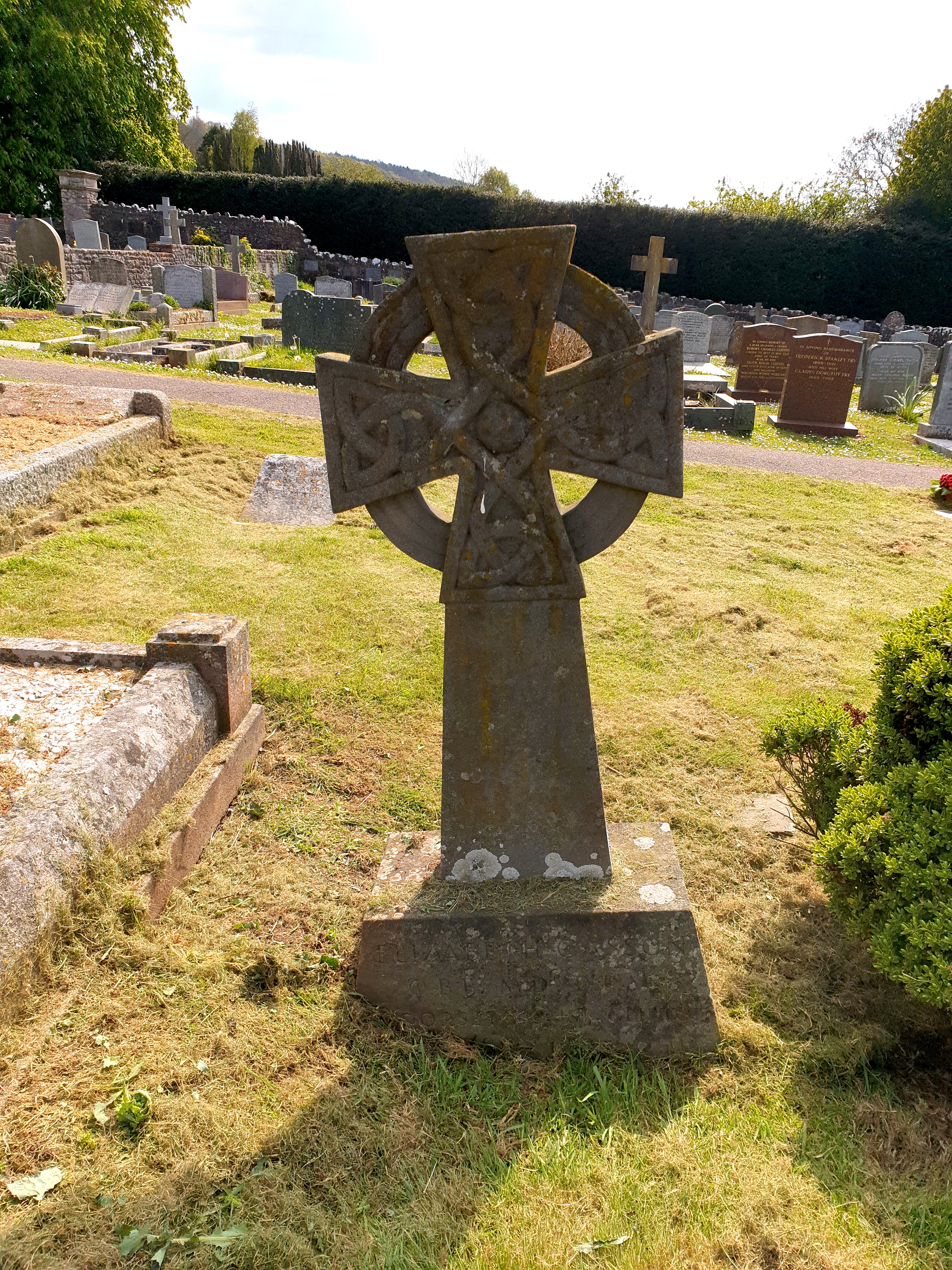
Casson's grave and headstone at St Andrew's Church, Backwell

Outside of her work, Casson was a member of Bristol societies. She never lost touch with her Welsh roots, discussing the similarities between Wales and Bristol with the Lord Mayor at a meal in 1931 and becoming president of the Bristol Cambrian Society in 1934. She also became the president of the Soroptimist Club of Bristol between 1938 and 1939 and was vice president of the Bristol branch of the British Social Hygiene Council in 1939.

She was an advocate for women working in roles outside offices, suggesting government grants for women who wanted to be nurses or teachers and giving lectures to parents about her work in occupational therapy in 1935. With the Soroptimist club she gave talks to her fellow members, praising the influence of Octavia Hill and explaining that she was interested more in mental health than physical health. She advocated an ordered life and a happy atmosphere for everyone.

As the vice president of the Social Hygiene Council, she worked to ensure that the people of Bristol could give better sex education to their children, without shocking them. She did this in part by hosting a series of lectures called "Sex Education and the Child", investing the profits from the lectures in providing educational materials for those who could not afford them.

== Legacy ==
In 1951, Casson received an OBE for her work establishing Dorset House and was also elected a fellow of the World Federation of Occupational Therapists. She was considered a pioneer in the field of occupational therapy. She died in Bristol on 17 December 1954 after suffering from anaemia. The funeral was held on 22 December 1954 at St Andrew's Church, Backwell.

The Royal College of Occupational Therapists holds an annual memorial lecture in Casson's name and the Callington Road Hospital in Bristol has a psychiatric intensive care unit named after her. In 2005 a pink rose was named in her honour. A Casson rose was planted in the Red Cross Garden, Southwark, where Casson worked for Octavia Hill. To mark International Women's Day in 2022, the Royal College of Psychiatrists published a blog post entitled 'Dr Elizabeth Casson, 100 years on.'
