= Helen S. Willard =

American occupational therapist

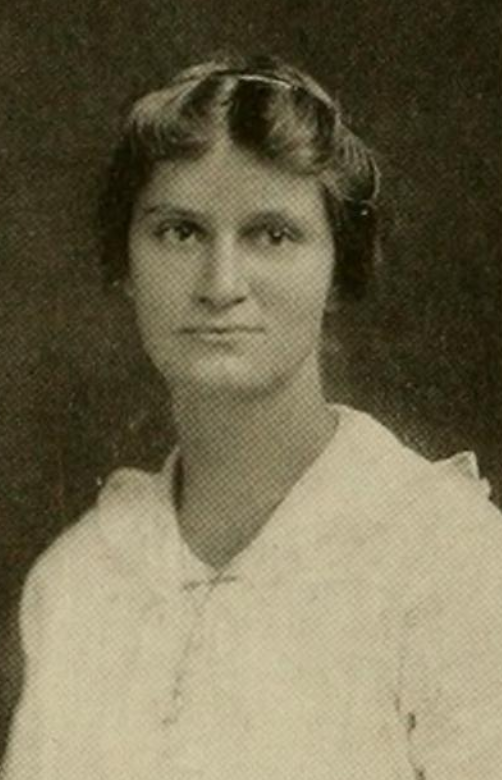
- Willard, from the 1915 yearbook of Wellesley College
- Born: January 22, 1894; Stamford, Connecticut, U.S.
- Died: June 8, 1980 (aged 86); Doylestown, Pennsylvania, U.S.
- Occupation: Occupational therapist
- Notable work: Principles of Occupational Therapy (1947)

Helen Smith Willard (January 22, 1894 – June 8, 1980) was an American occupational therapist, educator and author who held leadership positions in national and international organisations. She was one of the first professors of occupational therapy. Willard co-edited Principles of Occupational Therapy (1947), a seminal textbook written by and for occupational therapy personnel. She was president of the American Occupational Therapy Association (AOTA) from 1958 to 1961 and the first Chair of the World Federation of Occupational Therapists (WFOT) Education Committee (1952–1960).

== Early life and education ==
Willard was from Stamford, Fairfield County, Connecticut, the daughter of Everett Chickering Willard Sr. and Charlotte Elvira Smith. Her father, a descendant of Simon Willard, was a graduate of Dartmouth College, and Superintendent of Schools at Stamford between 1891 and 1912.

Willard attended Stamford High School and Wellesley College. In 1914 she was elected corresponding secretary to the Shakspere Society at Wellesley.

In 1918 Willard completed a Special War Course in physiotherapy at Harvard Medical School and Children’s Hospital in 1918. She qualified as an occupational therapist through the U.S. Civil Service in 1922.

== Career ==
=== Reconstruction Aide ===
Willard served as a Reconstruction Aide with the Medical Department of the United States Army for a decade. Reconstruction aides were civilian employees deployed in America and France to treat sick, injured and shell shocked servicemen from World War 1 with the aim of gaining employment on discharge.

She held leadership roles throughout her service with responsibility for physiotherapy (PT) and occupational therapy (OT) departments. Between December 1918 and October 1920 Willard was assigned to six facilities: Robert Breck Bingham Hospital, Camp Meade, Fort Oglethorpe, Detroit Ford Hospital, Walter Read Hospital and Hospital 50. Willard held senior positions at the Edward Hines Jr Hospital, a Veterans Hospital between 1920 and 1927. She was Chief Aide in O.T. and Chief Aide in P.T. from 1923 to 1927. Her final position was Chief Aide in P.T. at the New York Regional Office, which she held from December 1927 to March 1928 when she resigned from the service.

=== Philadelphia School of Occupational Therapy ===
In November 1928 Willard was appointed as an instructor at the Philadelphia School of Occupational Therapy, Director of the Curative Workshop and Director of the Occupational Therapy Department at the University of Pennsylvania Graduate Hospital. The Philadelphia School was one of the first in the country, opening in October 1918 to support the war effort by training women to serve in military hospitals as Reconstruction Aides.

Willard was appointed Director of the School in 1935, a leadership post she held until 1964 when she retired. In 1935, a three year course for graduates was added to the two year course for ‘persons of maturity and experience’ able to undertake intensive study. The three year course combined classroom and clinical experience.

In 1938, the School was accredited as an approved training school by the American Medical Association and the American Occupational Therapy Association. The Philadelphia School was one of the first four Schools in America to achieve this status.

Willard established partnerships with the University of Pennsylvania to meet the demand for training, to enhance the curriculum and the range of qualifications. The School expanded and developed a range of courses. By 1941 the School offered an Occupational Therapy Certificate with a bachelor’s degree in Education from the University of Pennsylvania; a 4-5 year course designed for women seeking college education; a course for women who had met prerequisite course requirements including up to two years of college education; a 21 month course for post-baccalaureate students who had a bachelor’s degree; and a three-year course for students who had completed a minimum of one year of college or its equivalent.

In the 1940s, Willard provided emergency war training courses for the military. Between 1942 and 1945 there was a 12 month, emergency war course comprising four months in the classroom and eight months in clinical internship. Seventy Army emergency occupational therapy aides enrolled on the final course in 1945. A year later, the U.S. Navy sent 18 nurses for training to provide occupational therapy in Naval Hospitals.^{:3}

There was a major organisational change in 1950 when occupational therapy became part of the new School of Auxiliary Medical Services alongside physical therapy and medical technology, at the University of Pennsylvania. Willard managed the merger of the Philadelphia School and was promoted to Professor of Occupational Therapy in 1950. The University recognized all graduates as alumnae and male students were accepted for the first time.

Willard retired as an emeritus professor in 1964. Between 1944 and 1965, the Philadelphia School had the highest ‘number of honors [for the registration examination] taken by any occupational therapy school in America. She oversaw the education of 1,136 graduates over 36 years. Willard was described as an "outstanding school director" because she "laid foundations (and) she continued as a builder, a designer, a reconstructor, never afraid to examine, to change, to advance".

Although Willard exemplified the old guard – white, middle class, educated women with old-money roots who pioneered occupational therapy – she opened opportunities for "lower-middle class and poorer students" who applied via academic scholarships to private universities or less costly education in the state college. She mentored "new arrivals into the ways of the "old guard", including the "proper’" standards of behaviour expected from young women.^{:244-245}

Alumni of the School were known as "Philadelphia Girls". Some started inaugural occupational therapy programmes in other countries, such as the Philippines, India and Israel. Others became leaders in America as administrators, practitioners, academics and researchers. One alumni, Ruth Brunyate Wiemer who served as President of the American Association (1964–1967) recalled how in 1957, Willard took her to dinner on the night Wiemer gave the prestigious Eleanor Clarke Slagle Lecture, saying "we always wore evening dresses. Helen was an incredible woman".^{: 253}

There are few anecdotes about Willard. A prospective student recollected Willard interrupting her admission interview, noting that "Helen Willard, looked up and said, "There’s a hurricane, you’d better get going".^{:282} Gail Fidler, who graduated in 1942, remembered arguing with Willard every day for infringing the uniform code. "There would be a call from Helen Willard’s office. She would say "Now Miss Spangle, you left your white cuffs", and she would shake her finger at me. I would tell her that her white cuffs were nonsense. She’d say "You have to accept some rules and regulations", I’d say, "Well not white cuffs."^{:271} A colleague, Carlotta Wells described her as "kind of a queen … You had to figure out what Helen wanted and do it Helen’s way, but she was very gracious and not pernickety. She wasn’t the queen bee in the sense of being lordly to everybody. We all went along with what she said and wanted".^{:244}

=== Volunteer leadership ===
Willard was renowned for her leadership and her long service as a volunteer with state, national and international occupational therapy organizations.^{:286} She was an early member of the American Occupational Therapy Association (AOTA), joining in 1922; and was instrumental in founding the World Federation of Occupational Therapists (WFOT) in 1952. Her contribution to professional organizations are listed:

1923-1925 President of the Physical Therapy and Occupational Therapy Association of the U.S Veterans Bureau

1924-1927 President of the Illinois Association of Occupational Therapists

1936-1937 President of the Pennsylvania Occupational Therapy Association

1936-1944 Member of the AOTA Board of Management

1941-1944 Chair of the AOTA National Defense Committee

1945-1959 Chair of the AOTA Education Committee

1952 Chair of the WFOT Preparatory Commission

1952-1960 Chair of the WFOT Education Committee

1958-1961 President of the American Occupational Therapy Association

==== American Occupational Therapy Association ====
As chair of the AOTA Committees for Occupational Therapy in National Defense and Education, Willard led significant policy initiatives.

She was appointed chairperson of the new National Defense committee in January 1941.^{:129} The committee addressed strategic matters, including the military status of occupational therapists, manpower shortages, boundary disputes and the standards of occupational therapy volunteer assistants. On October 13, 1942, Willard testified before the United States House Military Affairs Committee recommending the inclusion of occupational therapy in legislation recognising them as military, rather than civilian employees.^{:130} Although Willard was unsuccessful, this happened in 1947 with the establishment of a Women’s Medical Specialist Corp.^{:132}

Willard negotiated with the American Red Cross about complaints that Gray Ladies were doing occupational therapy due to the shortage of qualified staff. She asked the Education Committee to organise emergency war courses to increase the number of occupational therapists. As a result, eight accredited Schools, including Philadelphia ran emergency courses from July 1944 to June 1946 that were completed by 545 students.^{:135-137}

In 1941, Willard successfully advocated with Eleanor Roosevelt for the involvement of AOTA approved schools in the recruitment and training of occupational therapy volunteer assistants to assure appropriate standards. A total of 22 courses ran for 670 volunteers between January 1943 and February 1944.^{:137-139}

As Chair of the AOTA Education Committee in 1949, Willard responded to threats to the independence of the profession from proposed changes to the accreditation of training and the register of members, from physical medicine/medical rehabilitation, a new medical specialty, and also psychiatry. Psychiatrists, through the American Medical Association’s Council on Medical Education and Hospitals (AMA-CMEH) recommended that occupational therapists be known as occupational therapy technicians and that there should be medical director of schools of occupational therapy. A compromise was achieved with AMA-CMEH and in 1950 AOTA developed a policy statement that described the responsibility of occupational therapists to medical specialties and physicians. ^{:139-142} Willard, collaborating with Wade, the Clinical Director of Occupational Therapy, College of Medicine, University of Illinois, are credited with being "the ringleaders in breaking us away from physical medicine".^{:368}

Willard served as President of the American Association between 1958 and 1961.

==== World Federation of Occupational Therapists ====
Willard was the elected chair of the Preparatory Commission which established the World Federation of Occupational Therapists (WFOT). The Commission met over four days in April 1952 at the Liverpool School of Occupational Therapy, in England. Representatives from Canada, Denmark, South Africa, Sweden, UK and USA attended the meeting and messages of support were received from Australia, India, Israel and New Zealand. The Commission agreed the objectives, constitution and committee structure of the World Federation.^{:8-9}

Over the formative years, Willard supported the World Federation in strategic and practical ways. She was Chair of the Education Committee for eight years (1952-1960). The Philadelphia School hosted the WFOT Council meetings in October 1956 and October 1962. The third World Congress, attended by 1,100 delegates was held in Philadelphia in 1962. In 1960, Willard and Clare Spackman (her deputy from the Philadelphia School and WFOT President (1957-1962) visited Japan, Philippines, Hong Kong, Saigon, Bangkok, Sri Lanka, South Africa and Portugal to give advice to therapists and authorities on the development of the profession in their country.^{:21} Their visit to Nagpur to speak at the All-Indian Association of Occupational Therapists was mentioned in the Philadelphia Daily News. As the first Chairman of the Education Committee, "her long experience, mature judgment and respect for cultural viewpoints’ expanded international thinking and understanding".

== Publications ==
Willard wrote three articles promoting occupational therapy and co-edited one for the first texbooks about occupational therapy written by occupational therapists. The articles were

- Occupational Therapy: A New Profession" (1939)
- "Occupational Therapy as a Vocation" (1942)
- "Salvaging the Nation's Man Power" (1942)

=== The Book: Willard and Spackman ===
Willard co-edited the Principles of Occupational Therapy with Clare S. Spackman, published in 1947. Willard and Spackman selected authors who were the most prominent specialists in the field at the time and "pretty well outlined what each one would contribute".^{:248} Willard co-edited the next three editions published in 1954, 1963 and 1970.

The first edition was reviewed as a comprehensive, up-to-date resource for students and qualified staff; filling "a need felt in the profession for literature bearing directly on the application of Occupational Therapy". The 2nd edition was noted as "one of the greatest steps in the scientific growth of occupational therapy. It has been the outcome of tremendous research and is indeed an invaluable text and reference". In 1963, the 3rd edition had a new title: Occupational Therapy. A reviewer commented that "like its predecessors, it will be known familiarly to all occupational therapists by the names of the Editors and referred to simply as Willard and Spackman". The content indicated "the rapid progress in this field over the past ten years. This four hundred and seventy-three page book, considerably revised from the second edition, now covers many new developments in theory, research and clinical practice". A "completely updated, partially re-written" 4th edition included new chapters on mental health and Home Health Care.

In the foreword to the 5th edition (1978) Willard and Spackman announced their new role as "editors emeriti" having passed the editorship to their friends and co-authors Helen L Hopkins and Helen D Smith. They noted that 42 authors had contributed to four editions and that the 3rd and 4th editions were translated into Japanese and Spanish, respectively.

Willard and Spackman’s Occupational Therapy is regarded as "a cornerstone of accessible knowledge … an index of the growth of knowledge and the record of changing perspectives in the profession". Further editions were published in 1978 (5th), 1983 (6th), 1988 (7th), 1993 (8th), 1998 (9th), 2003 (10th), 2009 (11th), 2014 (12th), 2018 (13th) and 2023 (14th).^{:397}

== Awards ==
In 1954 Willard was named as a Distinguished Daughter of Pennsylvania. Only 70 women received this award since it was set up in 1947.

Willard received the highest honours given by the American Association and the World Federation. In 1954 she received the OT Award of Merit from the AOTA. A decade later, Willard was awarded an Honorary Fellowship from WFOT for her "outstanding contributions to and given leadership in the development of occupational therapy at the international level over a period of time".^{:33}

== Personal life and legacy ==
Willard and Spackman "understood the importance of preserving the “sacredness” of private versus professional life ... they led quiet lives, meaningful lives in which they would “stow away” to the cottage on the shore of Lake Champlain in Vermont, called Stowaway, where they would read, rest, and explore the countryside".

Helen Smith Willard died in 1960, at the age of 86, in Doylestown, Pennsylvania. Clare Spackman described Willard's final days in a letter published in the WFOT Bulletin. She wrote that Willard received "excellent care" at Doylestown Hospital for a fractured femur, sustained falling out of bed; she died four days later. Spackman commented "I know you will feel as I do that she has been spared much suffering and prolonged hospitalisation".

In 1981, the AOTA established the Helen S. Willard Scholarship in her memory. Willard was named by the American Association as one of the 100 most influential people in the centenary year, 2017.
