= Margaret Barr Fulton =

Scottish occupational therapist

- Born: Margaret Barr Fulton; 14 February 1900; Cheetham, Manchester, England
- Died: 16 December 1989 (aged 89); Edinburgh, Scotland
- Occupation: occupational therapist
- Known for: first qualified occupational therapist to work in the UK

Margaret Barr Fulton MBE (14 February 1900 – 16 December 1989) was a Scottish occupational therapist. Fulton was the first qualified occupational therapist to work in the UK. She worked at the Aberdeen Royal Asylum (now Royal Cornhill Hospital) from 1925 until her retirement in 1963. Fulton was a founder of the World Federation of Occupational Therapists and its first president.

== Early life and education ==
Fulton was born on 14 February 1900 in Cheetham, Manchester, England to Dr. Andrew Boyd and Elizabeth (née Barr) Fulton. Her parents were Scottish. She was the youngest of their five children. Her father was a general practitioner. Fulton was privately educated at Manchester High School for Girls. After her father's death in 1919, she went on holiday to the US with her mother to visit relatives. On this holiday, she first learnt about occupational therapy, and decided to study at the Philadelphia School of Occupational Therapy between 1922 and 1923. After obtaining a diploma from the school, she completed a six-month placement at the Metropolitan Hospital Center in New York City where she fostered her interest in psychiatry.

== Career ==
Fulton returned to the UK and attempted to find a job for seven months before psychiatrist David Henderson, who had previously started the first occupational therapy department in the UK, arranged for her to meet Robert Dods Brown, the medical superintendent of the Aberdeen Royal Asylum (now Royal Cornhill Hospital). Fulton was appointed in 1925, therefore becoming the first qualified occupational therapist to work in the UK.

In her role, she instructed crafts lessons for patients, and in 1927 she organised an exhibition of their work, which was inaugurated by the Commissioner for Lunacy Sir Arthur Rose. By 1932, fifteen therapists had been appointed in Scottish mental health hospitals, and together they created the Scottish Association of Occupational Therapy with Fulton as secretary and treasurer. She went on to become elected as its chairwoman in 1946 and served on its council from 1949 to 1960 and 1964–1971.

Fulton was a founder of the World Federation of Occupational Therapists in 1952 and was elected as its first president. After the organisation held its first international congress in Edinburgh, Scotland in August 1954, she received an MBE in the 1955 New Year Honours for her contribution to the profession.

== Retirement and legacy ==
Fulton retired in 1963. She died on 16 December 1989 in Edinburgh. On 12 May 1995, Princess Anne, the patron of the Royal College of Occupational Therapists, inaugurated the Fulton Clinic and Memorial Garden at the Royal Cornhill Hospital in recognition of her work.

== Bibliography ==
- Haines, Catharine M. C.; Stevens, Helen M. (2001). International Women in Science: A Biographical Dictionary to 1950. ABC-CLIO. ISBN 978-1-57607-090-1.
- Creek, Jennifer; Lougher, Lesley (29 November 2011). Occupational Therapy and Mental Health. Elsevier Health Sciences. ISBN 978-0-7020-4876-0.
