= Dorset House, Bristol =

Historic building in Bristol, England

Dorset House
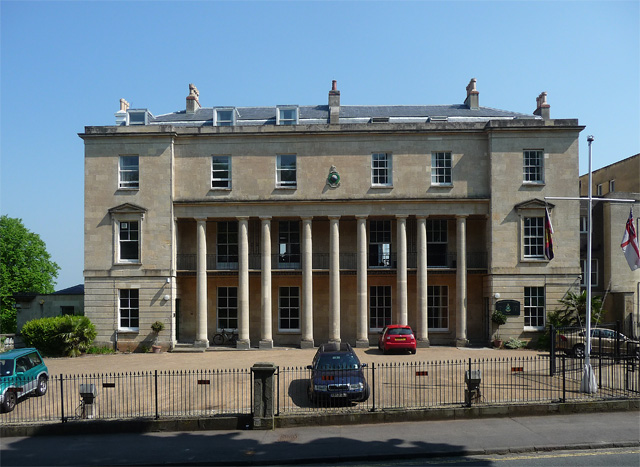
- The building in 2012

- Location within Bristol

General information
- Architectural style: Neoclassical
- Location: Litfield Place, Clifton Down, Bristol, England
- Coordinates: 51.4579°N 2.6252°W
- Year built: 1834

Design and construction
- Architect: Richard Shackleton Pope

Listed Building – Grade II*
- Official name: Dorset House (formerly Alva House and Dorset House) and attached terrace and balustrade
- Designated: 4 March 1977
- Reference no.: 1282215

Dorset House is a historic building at Litfield Place on Clifton Down in Bristol, England. The building, which was used as a school of occupational therapy and then as the regional headquarters of the Royal Marines Reserve, is a Grade II* listed building.

== History ==
The building was commissioned by the Society of Merchant Venturers as part of a series of villas created for wealthy merchants in Clifton Down in the 1820s and 1830s. The structure was originally conceived as two semi-detached villas, Alva House (No. 8) and Dorset House (No. 9). It was designed by Richard Shackleton Pope in the neoclassical style, built in ashlar stone and was completed in 1834.

The design of the three-storey building involved a symmetrical main frontage of six bays facing onto Litfield Place. The central section of four bays featured a recessed colonnade formed by nine Doric order columns placed in antis supporting an entablature. Above the colonnade, the second floor was fenestrated by four sash windows. The end bays, which were slightly projected forward and rusticated on the ground floor, were fenestrated by sash windows on all three floors with the first floor windows being pedimented. At roof level, there was a cornice and a small parapet. The architectural historian, Nikolaus Pevsner, was critical of the layout of the columns which he viewed as having been "arranged perversely".

In the late 19th century, Dorset House was the home of the local Member of Parliament, Sir Joseph Dodge Weston.

The property remained in residential use until 1930, when Elizabeth Casson acquired Dorset House, with financial support from her brother, Sir Lewis Casson, and converted the building for use as the UK's first occupational therapy school. She appointed herself medical director, and developed the school such that it taught a wide range of occupational therapies including weaving, bookbinding, and other crafts. The school temporarily relocated to Bromsgrove during the Second World War, and after Dorset House was damaged by German bombing during the war, the school permanently relocated to an existing property, which was duly renamed Dorset House, in Oxford in 1946.

After the war the house in Bristol was restored to residential use and continued in that use until 1963 when it was acquired by the Royal Marines Reserve. A drill hall was added behind the complex in 1976. In July 2023, the headquarters of the Royal Marines Reserve moved out of Dorset House so as to co-locate with the Royal Naval Reserve at HMS Flying Fox in Winterstoke Road.

== See also ==
- Grade II* listed buildings in Bristol
