= Philadelphia School of Occupational Therapy =

- U.S. National Register of Historic Places
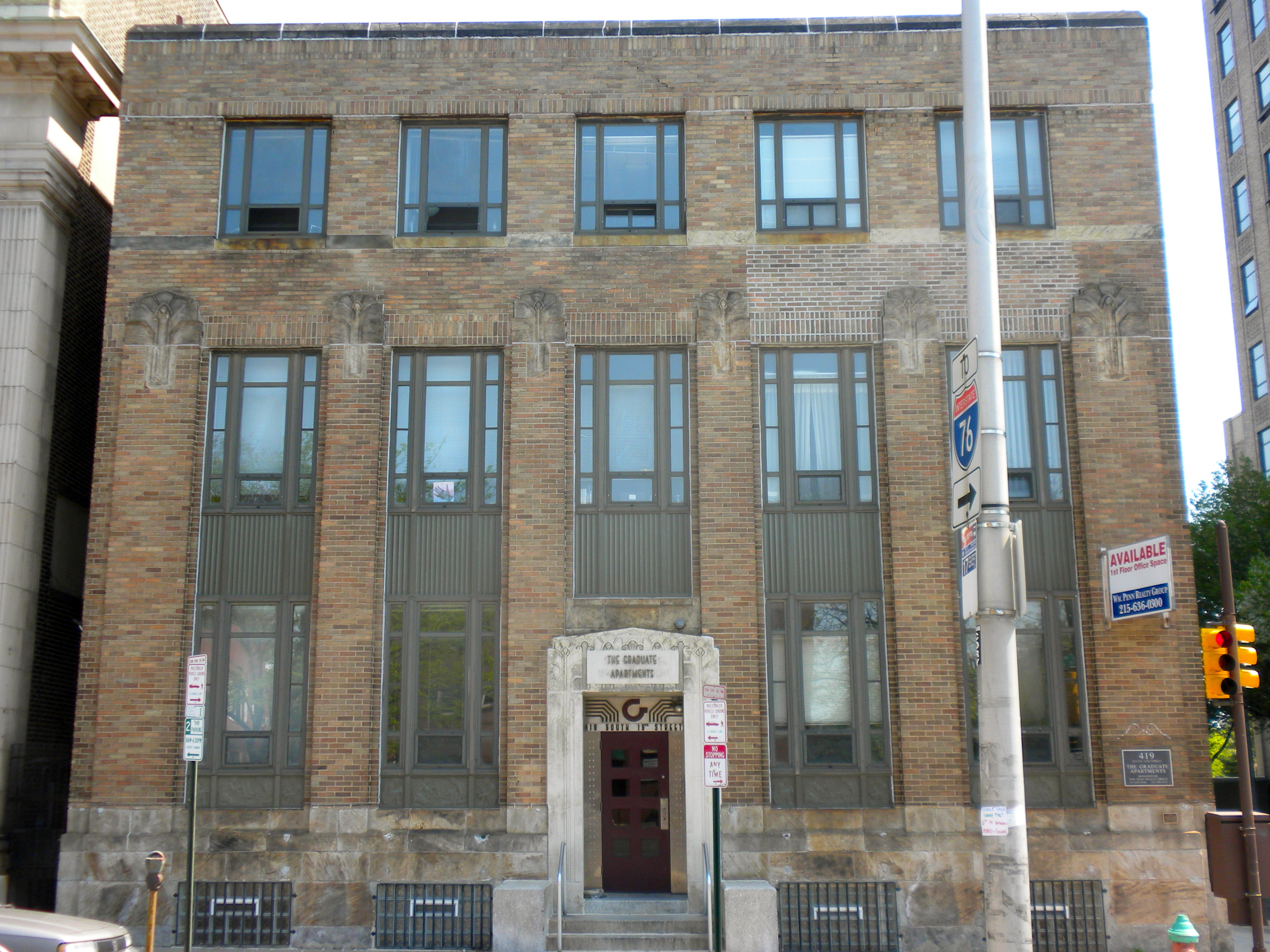
- Philadelphia School of Occupational Therapy, April 2010

- Location within Philadelphia Location within Pennsylvania Location within the United States
- Location: 419 S. 19th St., Philadelphia, Pennsylvania
- Coordinates: 39°56′45″N 75°10′20″W
- Area: less than one acre
- Built: 1930
- Architect: Bissell & Sinker; Yeatman, Georgina P.
- Architectural style: Art Deco
- NRHP reference No.: 03000528
- Added to NRHP: June 13, 2003

The Philadelphia School of Occupational Therapy, also known as the Medical Services Building, is an historic school building which is located in the Rittenhouse Square West neighborhood of Philadelphia, Pennsylvania.

It was designed by Georgina Pope Yeatman, who was one of only four women to be licensed as architects by the Commonwealth of Pennsylvania during the early part of her career. Yeatman later went on to become the first woman ever to be appointed to the post as director of architecture for the city of Philadelphia, which was the third largest city in Pennsylvania during the 1930s.

It was added to the National Register of Historic Places in 2003.

== History and architectural features ==
A three-story, five-bay, U-shaped brown brick building, which was designed in the Art Deco style by Georgina Pope Yeatman of the Bissell & Sinkler architecture firm, the Philadelphia School of Occupational Therapy was built in 1930 as a two-story building. A third story was added in 1939. The front facade features sculptural iron panels, sandstone carvings, and two-story brick pilasters with decorative caps. The Philadelphia School of Occupational Therapy occupied the building into the late-1950s, after which it housed medical offices associated with the University of Pennsylvania. It has been converted to apartments.

=== School of Occupational Therapy ===
The Philadelphia School of Occupational Therapy which opened in October 1918 was one, of five founding programmes in America. By June 1919, 50 women had graduated to serve as Reconstruction Aides in military hospitals treating servicemen injured in World War 1. Helen Willard was Director of the School for 35 years, between 1935 and 1964. Notable alumni included Margaret Barr Fulton, Kamala Nimbkar, Constance Owens and Muriel Zimmerman.

== See also ==
- Helen S. Willard
- Georgina Pope Yeatman

== Gallery ==
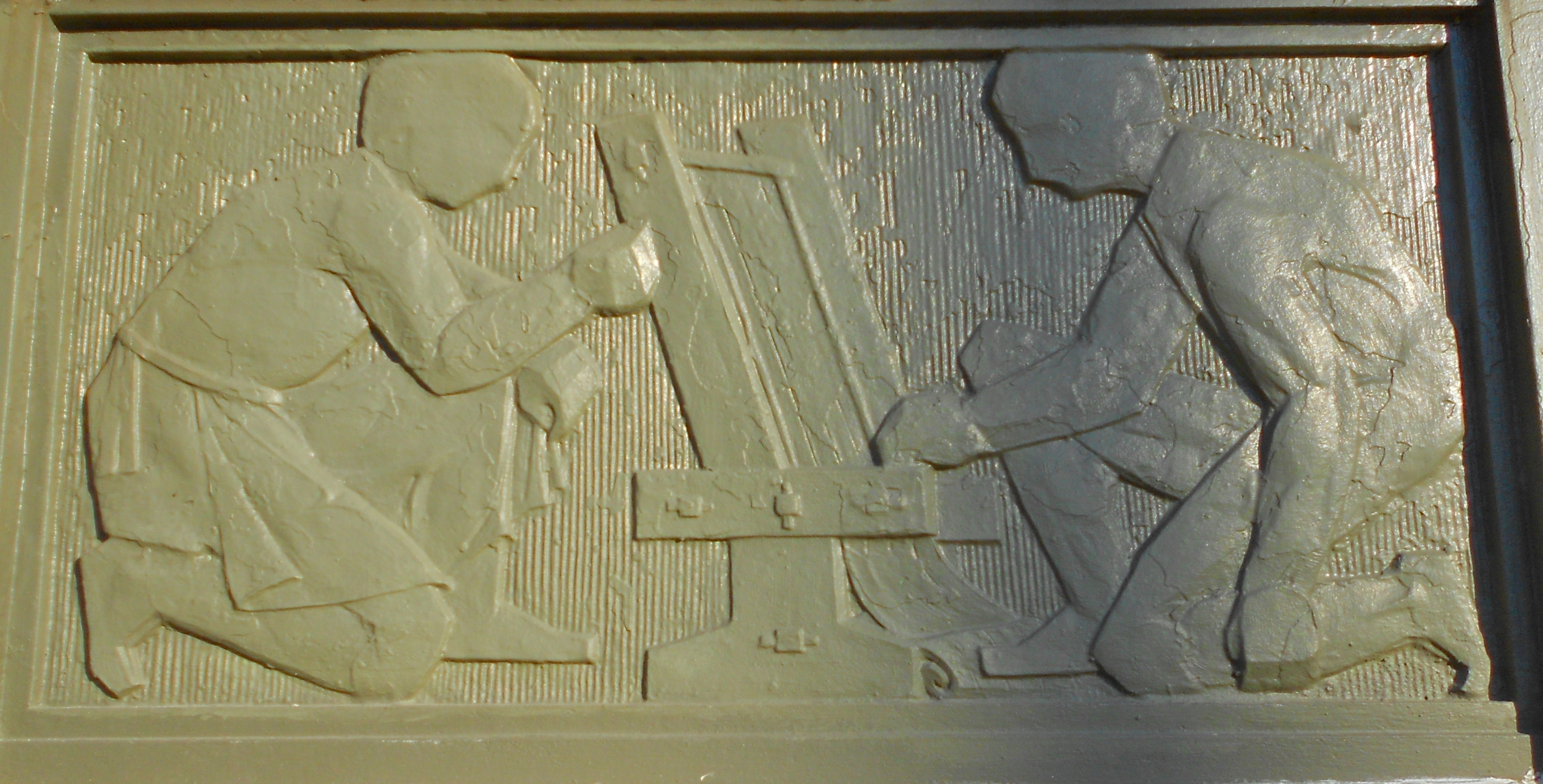
Iron panel
