= Therapeutic garden =

Garden designed for calming

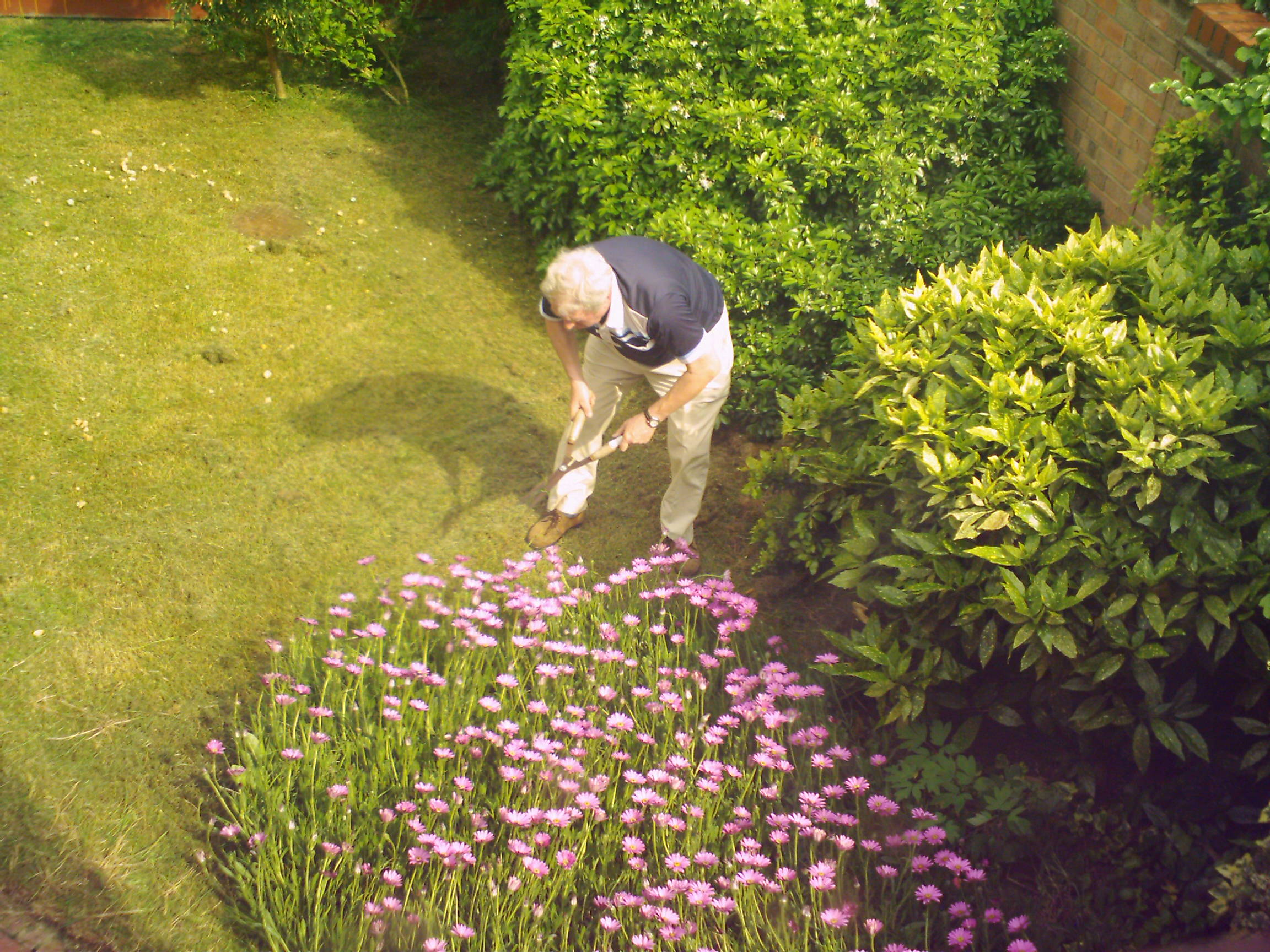
Gardening as therapy

A therapeutic garden or wellness garden is an outdoor garden space that has been specifically designed to meet the physical, psychological, social and spiritual needs of the people using the garden as well as their caregivers, family members and friends.

Therapeutic gardens can be found in a variety of settings, including hospitals, skilled nursing homes, assisted living residences, continuing care retirement communities, out-patient cancer centers, hospice residences, and other related healthcare and residential environments. The focus of the gardens is primarily on incorporating plants and friendly wildlife into the space. The settings can be designed to include active uses such as raised planters for horticultural therapy activities or programmed for passive uses such as quiet private sitting areas next to a small pond with a trickling waterfall.

== History ==
The American Horticultural Therapy Association (AHTA) Definitions and Positions Paper draws a distinction between a therapeutic garden and a healing garden. The AHTA defines a healing garden as "plant dominated environments including green plants, flowers, water, and other aspects of nature. They are generally associated with hospitals and other healthcare settings, designated as healing gardens by the facility, accessible to all, and designed to have beneficial effects on most users." On the other hand, a therapeutic garden is "designed for use as a component of a treatment program such as occupational therapy, physical therapy, or horticultural therapy programs and can be considered as a subcategory of a healing garden." A therapeutic garden can be described as being therapeutic in nature when it has been designed to meet the needs of an individual or group. Individuals or groups strive to improve their well-being through active engagement by using plants and engaging in activities ranging from planting, growing and maintaining plants.

Horticulture has been soothing man's senses as early as 2000 BC in Mesopotamia. Lush agricultural plots lay in the fertile river valleys between the Tigris and Euphrates providing agriculture and inspiration for the first designed gardens in this typical arid landscape. In the 5th century AD, gardens were generally perceived to contribute to the improvement of health and have been used as a place of respite from travels, to serve as a place to recover or recuperate from an illness, or to simply isolate the sick or infirm from the healthy individuals. Gardens located within Christian hospices in the Middle Ages emphasized charity and hospitality. Monasteries ministering to the sick and the insane incorporated an arcaded courtyard where they could find the some shelter, sun, or shade in a human-scale, enclosed setting.

In the 18th to the 19th century, the increased need for hygiene during treatment led to the acceptable uses of "sanitary reforms" such as cross-ventilation, access to sunlight and gardens. The 20th century ushered in the discovery of germ theory, advances in medical science theories, the biomedical model, and improved technology in the medical sciences.

The biomedical model, derived from Louis Pasteur's germ theory of disease, became the predominant conceptual model used by physicians in diagnosing disease. According to the biomedical model, health constitutes the freedom from disease, pain, or defect, thus making the normal human condition "healthy". The biomedical model of health focuses solely on biological factors, and excludes psychological, environmental, and social influences. This narrow focus rationalized and streamlined not only medical diagnosis but also medical processes. Infection reduction, cost effectiveness and operational efficiency became the norm in the design of medical facilities. "Pressure from insurance companies to minimize hospital stays have largely worked against the provision of actual usable gardens in new or refurbished medical complexes.". At this time, gardens were no longer perceived as settings that could contribute to the restoration of the patient's health. Nature and gardens were relegated to the beautification of entrances; small "pocket" areas were used as focal points; sidewalks and even parking areas.

In response to the reductionistic scope of the biomedical model, several medical researchers and scientists such as George Engel strongly believed that "…a medical model must also take into account the patient, the social context in which he lives, and the complementary system devised by society to deal with the disruptive effects of illness, that is, the physical role and the health care system. This requires a biopsychosocial model." Since then, the impact of the physical environment on the well-being and health of the patient has received extensive academic research and attention. In 1984, Roger Ulrich conducted a ground-breaking study comparing the positive effect of views of natural scenery, i.e., trees, on the recovery of patients from surgery to patients in similar conditions who were exposed to a view of a brick wall. He was the first to use the standards of modern medical research—strict experimental controls and quantified health outcomes—to demonstrate that gazing at a garden can sometimes speed healing from surgery, infections and other ailments. Ulrich showed that in comparison with the wall-view group, the patients with the tree-view had the following results: shorter post-operative hospital stays; fewer negative evaluative comments from nurses; took less medication, and slightly lower scores for minor post-surgical complications. In 1992, Dr. Stokols proposed a concept of health promotive environments that involves the physical and social features of the physical environment and how they affect the overall well-being of individuals and groups.

== Examples ==
Enid Haupt Glass Garden: Combining horticultural therapy with medical therapy – Built in 1959, the garden is part of the Rusk Institute of Rehabilitation Medicine at New York University. The Rusk Institute is one of the world's leading centers for rehabilitation medicine. Dr. Howard Rusk, a pioneer in rehabilitation of physical disabilities convinced Enid Haupt to donate a greenhouse amidst the increase of returning World War II soldiers and polio patients. The garden started simply as a peaceful retreat from hospital treatment or rehabilitation; but has grown to incorporate a program of horticultural therapy in the 1970s. Trained horticultural therapists work with patients in the therapeutic garden to identify, nurture and learn from plants. Ultimately, the goal is to make therapy seem like a respite.

Joel Schnaper Memorial Garden: Garden of Hope – Recipient of the 1995 Therapeutic Garden Design Award by the AHTA and the 1995 Merit Award for Design from the ASLA. The therapeutic garden is part of the Terence Cardinal Cooke Medical Center in New York City. In 1989, the center became the first long-term care skilled nursing facility to designate a unit to care for HIV / AIDS patients. The garden "provides opportunity for everyone to connect with nature on their own terms, in their own way and at their own pace, regardless of their capabilities." Built in 1995 and rebuilt in 2004, the Schnaper Garden is a restorative garden, advancing the concept that "properly planned and operated gardens can reduce stress and encourage a sense of well being for long-term health care patients." Designed with an appreciation of changing medical protocols and individual preferences, a series of garden rooms vary in size and character to provide opportunities for structured activities, casual socializing, contemplation, and quiet solitude. A choice of protective settings is offered for individual comfort, ranging from complete shade to full sun. Ease of maneuverability is emphasized to conserve stamina and encourage residents to experience the garden without assistance. The Joel Schnaper Memorial Garden is designed by Dirtworks Landscape Architecture, PC New York, NY.

Mother / Child Garden at Bedford Hills Correctional Facility: Garden of Connection and Compassion –Gardens have been used in U.S. prisons since at least the 19th century for vocational training and therapy. The Mother / Child Garden at Bedford Hills Correctional Facility located in Bedford, New York is part of an innovative program created in 2005 that recognizes family and motherhood as a transformative process for female inmates. The garden acts as a meeting place for mothers and their visiting children to reconnect. It is natural setting that relieves the stresses of incarceration and separation, renewing bonds of nurturing and compassion amidst mature and shady linden trees, newly planted trees, perennial beds, play equipment, arbors and picnic tables. Within this enclosed and safe setting, families enjoy togetherness, free of judgment and the harsh realities imposed on their lives. The Mother / Child Garden is designed by Daniel Winterbottom, RLA, FASLA.

Elizabeth & Nona Evans Restorative Garden: Combining landscape design and modern medical technology in a public setting – Recipient of the 2005 Therapeutic Garden Design Award by the AHTA and the 2006 Honor Award in Design from the ASLA. As part of the Cleveland Botanical Garden, the therapeutic garden reflects the mission of the Botanical Garden to "blend education, social responsibility, cultural and environmental stewardship.". This restorative garden uses a "best practices" approach to therapeutic gardens. It combines design and medical technology advances learned in a hospital setting and applied in a publicly accessible space. The result is a deep understanding of the dynamic between public and private spaces. A balance is effectively struck between the public botanical garden where all visitors are welcome to stroll and the privacy and security that some visitors to the therapeutic garden would want and need. The garden is composed of three unique settings, each with a distinct character and level of activity: one for quiet contemplation; one for both individual exploration and teaching large groups; and one for horticultural therapy. The desire to create a sense of welcome and accommodation for all, regardless of ability, was a significant consideration in details and the selection of materials. The Elizabeth & Nona Evans Restorative Garden is designed by Dirtworks Landscape Architecture, PC, New York, NY.

Warrior and Family Center Support Center Healing Garden: A Garden for Soldiers – Recipient of the 2015 Therapeutic Garden Design Award by the AHTA. The garden, located in San Antonio, Texas, at the Brooke Army Medical Center, is dedicated to soldiers and their families to assist and comfort them through their physical and emotional recovery. The goal of the Warrior and Family Center is to create an empathetic environment as they make their way to rejoin society and lead civilian lives. The garden provides a place to exercise with fitness trails and exercise stations, experience nature, relax, and spend time alone with friends and family. Thoughtful consideration was given from the surfaces used by soldiers with prosthesis, lush and colorful plants, edible flowers and fruits, to shaded porches and walkways for protection from the Texas sun. Warriors are also able to use the Gardens for social events. The Warrior and Family Center Support Center Healing Garden is designed by Quatrefoil Inc., Portland, OR.

The Crown Sky Garden: Ann & Robert H. Lurie Children's Hospital of Chicago - Recipient of the 2013 ASLA Professional Awards, located in Chicago, Illinois. Designed by Mikyoung Kim, the garden was "built upon a growing body of scientific research which links access to natural light and contemplative spaces to reduced patient recovery time." The 5,000 square foot garden provides scenic views to the city, natural bamboo plantings, peaceful resting areas, and active areas for children. The space was designed with colorful walls and natural materials to provide a space that would be inviting to patients of all ages.

Olson Family Garden at St. Louis Children’s Hospital - This garden was built in 2000 and is located in St. Louis, Missouri, on top of the St. Louis Children's Hospital. The Olson Family Garden was built as a sanctuary for patients and their families to find respite from their sickness and trials. The garden is built on the 7th floor of the building and overlooks St. Louis’s largest park, Forest Park. The roof is an intensive green roof with 3 feet of soil to maintain its 7000 plants, flowers, and trees. Over its 16 years, the garden has grown well and been very successful. It is a place that families often come back to years after to remember the experiences they have with their family members while there.

A unique an interesting therapeutic garden located in White Plains, New York has been designed specifically for dementia patients. This garden is unique because it is on a fifth floor balcony and has an elongated shape that is uncommon for a therapeutic dementia garden. Typically therapeutic dementia gardens are square or round and create easy walking paths that follow these shapes. This elongated garden is split up into three distinct areas with two entrances, one from the dining room / kitchen and the other from the activity room. Entrances are a very important part of dementia gardens. Because way finding abilities can be damaged by the disease clear way finding strategies must be put into place. Entrances have to be thoroughly considered when designing a therapeutic dementia garden. Having the entrances be extremely obvious is one of the ways this is executed. Entrances should be visible from all places in the garden and should be very obvious that they are an entrance or exit. Another strategy that this particular garden uses is the use of colour, with a path painted onto the ground. Each distinct area of the garden is a different colour and is connected with a very obvious walking path for the patients to follow. The three areas of the garden include: “a covered front porch outside the kitchen; a park with circular benches between the two other areas and with no direct doorway inside; and a back yard with seating and a barbecue outside the second doorway.” Therapeutic dementia gardens are used to reduce the symptoms of the disorder without the use of drugs.

== In literature ==
- Design for Aging: Post-Occupancy Evaluations, American Institute of Architects
- Healing Gardens: Therapeutic Benefits and Design Recommendations, Clare Cooper Marcus and Marni Barnes, Eds.
- Healing Landscapes: Therapeutic Outdoor Environments, Martha Tyson
- The Healing Landscape: Gardening for the Mind, Body, and Soul, Gay Search
- Interaction by Design: Bringing People and Plants Together for Health and Well-Being, Candice Shoemaker, Ed.
- Restorative Gardens: The Healing Landscape, Nancy Gerlach-Spriggs, Richard Enoch Kaufman, Sam Bass Warner Jr.
- Therapeutic Landscapes: An Evidence-Based Approach to Designing Healing Gardens and Restorative Outdoor Spaces, Clare Cooper Marcus and Naomi Sachs
- Therapeutic Gardens: Design for Healing Spaces, by Daniel Winterbottom and Amy Wagenfeld

== See also ==
- List of garden types
- Sensory garden
- Horticultural therapy
- Alzheimer's disease
