= Sensory garden =

Garden area providing sensory experiences

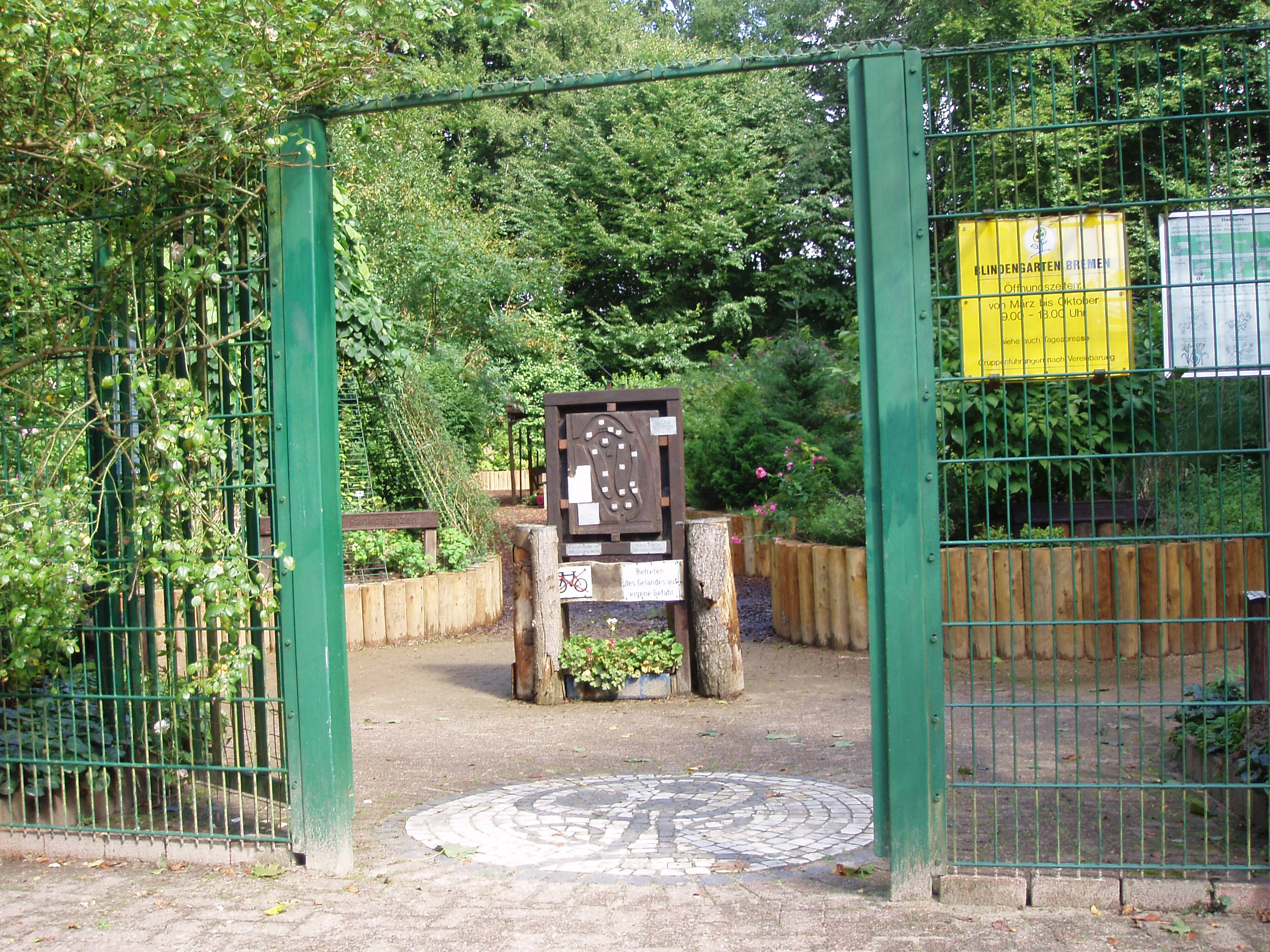
Entrance to a sensory garden in Bremen. The 'Blind People's Garden' (Blindengarten) in Knoops Park is designed to allow people with visual impairments to find their way around the garden and experience its features without assistance.

A sensory garden is a self-contained garden area that allows visitors to enjoy a wide variety of sensory experiences. Sensory gardens are designed to provide opportunities to stimulate the senses, both individually and in combination, in ways that users may not usually encounter.

Sensory gardens have a wide range of educational and recreational applications. They can be used in the education of special-needs students, including autistic people. As a form of horticultural therapy, they may act as therapeutic gardens to help in the care of people with dementia.

Sensory gardens can be designed in such a way as to be accessible and enjoyable for both disabled and non-disabled users. A sensory garden, for example, may contain features accessible to the disabled individual such as: scented and edible plants, sculptures and sculpted handrails, water features designed to make sound and play over the hands, textured touch-pads, magnifying-glass screens, and braille and audio induction loop descriptions. Depending on the user group, other provisions may integrate sound and music more centrally to combine the play needs of younger users with their sensory needs.

Many sensory gardens devote themselves to providing experience for multiple senses; those specialising in scent are sometimes called scented gardens, those specialising in music/sound are sound gardens where the equipment doubles up to provide an enhanced opportunity for strategic developmental, learning and educational outcomes.

Sensory gardens usually have an enhanced infrastructure to permit wheelchair access and meet other accessibility concerns; the design and layout provides a stimulating journey through the senses, heightening awareness, and bringing positive learning experiences.

== Design ==
Sensory garden design is generally based around the five Aristotelian senses, but it can also include other senses such as proprioception and balance. In addition to plants, non-living elements, such as water features and sculptures, may be incorporated.

=== Sight ===
Sight components in a sensory garden include traditional garden elements like colourful plants and flowers, which are sometimes clustered together to assist people with vision impairments. They have a diverse variety of colours, shape, size, and texture. Bright colours from flowers can activate the colour centre of the brain. Colourful and native plant species can be used to attract birds, butterflies, and insects to the garden, which can add additional sight variety.

Ornamental grasses are added and can be kept all season round to create dimension. Adding ornamental grasses creates a dramatic effect to the space. Sometimes, water features like ponds and fountains allow for luring in wildlife like birds, allowing visitors to bird watch.

=== Sound ===
Sound components in a sensory garden are often things that make sounds naturally in a breeze. This includes plants like bamboo, grasses, and trees, as well as non-living elements like bells and wind chimes. Water features and birds are also common sound components. Implementing spaces that draw in other insects and animals will also create a natural soundscape. Bird baths are used to attract them and allow an inviting space for them to spring and splash around in.

Incorporating differently textured walkways can allow for different sounds and stimulate the ears. For example, loose gravel could be used for a crunchy effect, using concrete for a more dramatic sound depending on the shoe.

Less common sound components include hand instruments (such as drums), echo spaces, and chiming stepping stones.

=== Smell ===
Adding plants that have an aroma enhances the olfactory bulb, which is the part of the brain that processes smells. To create this aroma, floral fragrances like lavender, rosemary, some rose cultivars, and man-made smells like fresh-cut grass are often used.

=== Touch ===
Having “contrasting elements” like seed pods, different textures of bark or foliage, and plants like lamb's ear or viburnum and stones or bricks can create a desire to engage with those materials. Using touch in sensory gardens can encourage exploration and can help people learn and gather information, creating different experiences for individuals.

=== Taste ===
Vegetables or fruits in the garden space contribute to the inclusion of taste in a sensory garden. Plants like tomatoes, blueberries if there is a correct soil acidity, raspberries, carrots, herbs and some edible flowers can be installed.

Incorporating these things in a garden space will allow calmness and help engage the brain in a positive way. Children's brain development can be enhanced by engaging all the senses at once; a child will grow up to be more emotionally and physically in tune. The engaging aspects of a sensory garden will stimulate and enhance memory, problem solving, and encourage outdoor activities. This, in turn, will alleviate anxiety, psychiatric disorders, and bad moods. In designs, access points are included for those with disabilities such as people who require wheelchairs to move, are blind, or are hard of hearing.

== Sensory dementia gardens ==
Sensory gardens can be designed specifically for people with dementia, a condition that can affect different parts of the brain and many aspects of everyday life, including memory, in which everyday tasks such as walking or eating typically become difficult. Sensory or therapeutic gardens can be used to help reduce the symptoms of dementia without the use of drugs through stimulation of the senses, exercising various parts of the brain. Sensory gardens may elicit positive emotions in people living with dementia, and help improve their quality of life.

Design characteristics may include water features that produces soothing sounds, pick-and-sniff herb and flower beds, and benches with different types of sand or pebbles. For example, in a sensory garden located in Port Macquarie, Australia, a man diagnosed with dementia enjoyed sinking his toes into the sand as it could remind him of Australia, while the gravel reminded him of Scotland, where he was born, provoking a less enthusiastic response. Other potential benefits include a calming and relaxing place providing an easy and safe way to exercise with feelings of independence.

== Gallery ==
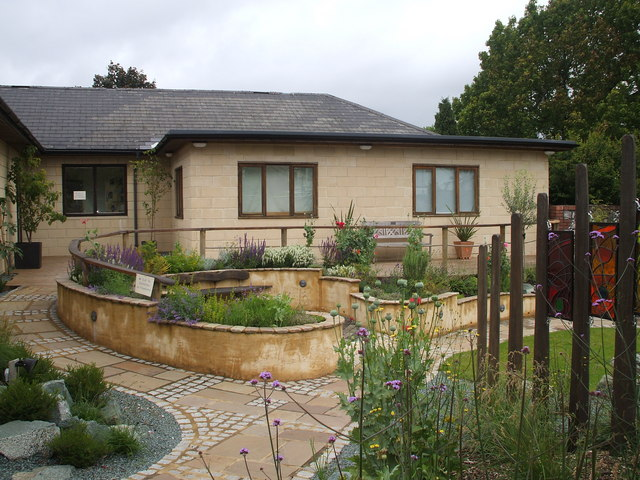
This sensory garden was designed for children with special needs at St Christopher's School in Westbury Park, Bristol, England.

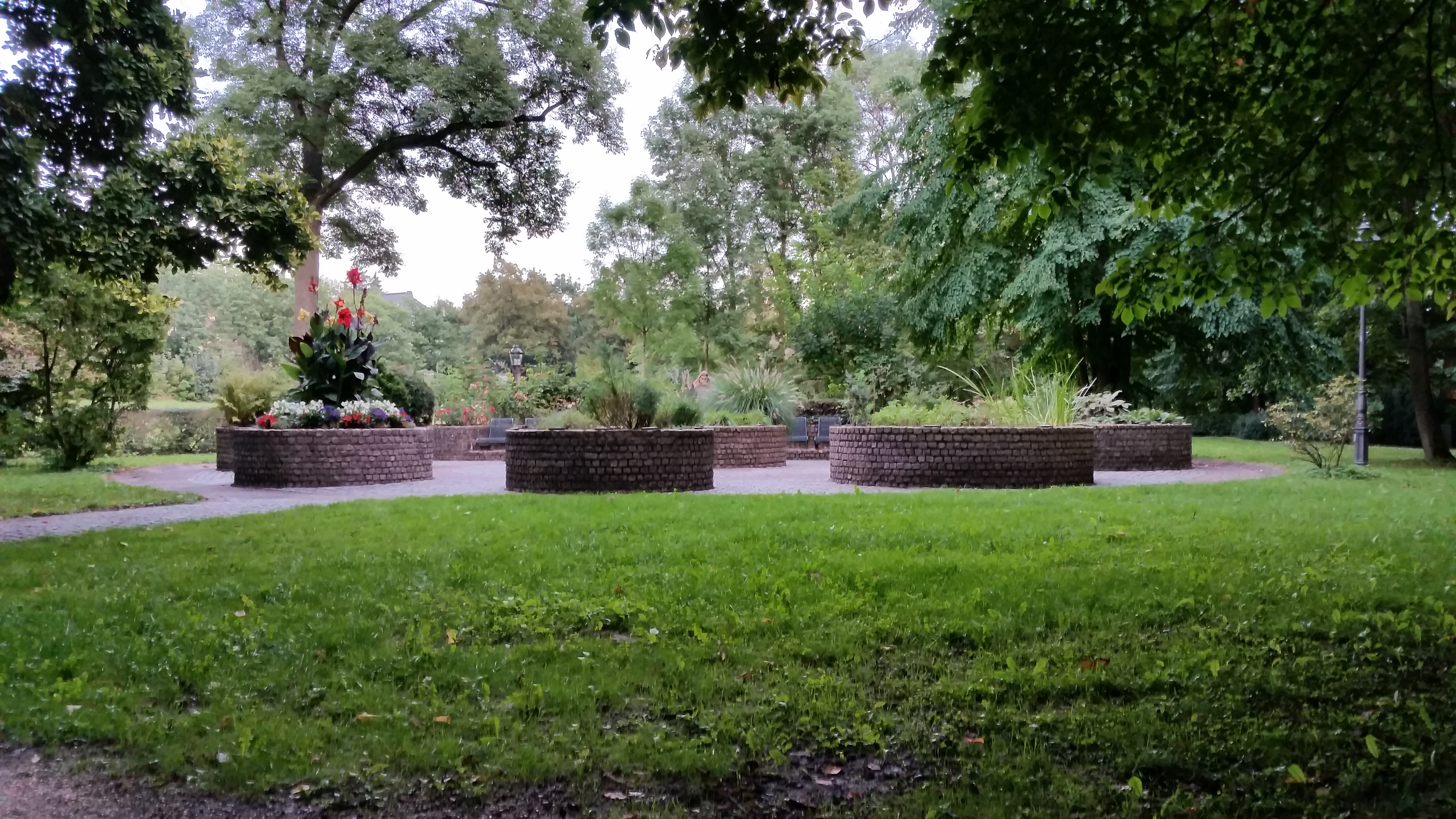
The Blindengarten in the Bad Homburg Spa Park (Kurpark) in Germany is a "smell and touch" garden comprising eight thematically planted raised beds (culinary herbs, medicinal herbs, roses, grasses, etc.) arranged around a central fountain that can provide acoustic orientation for blind and visually-impaired people.

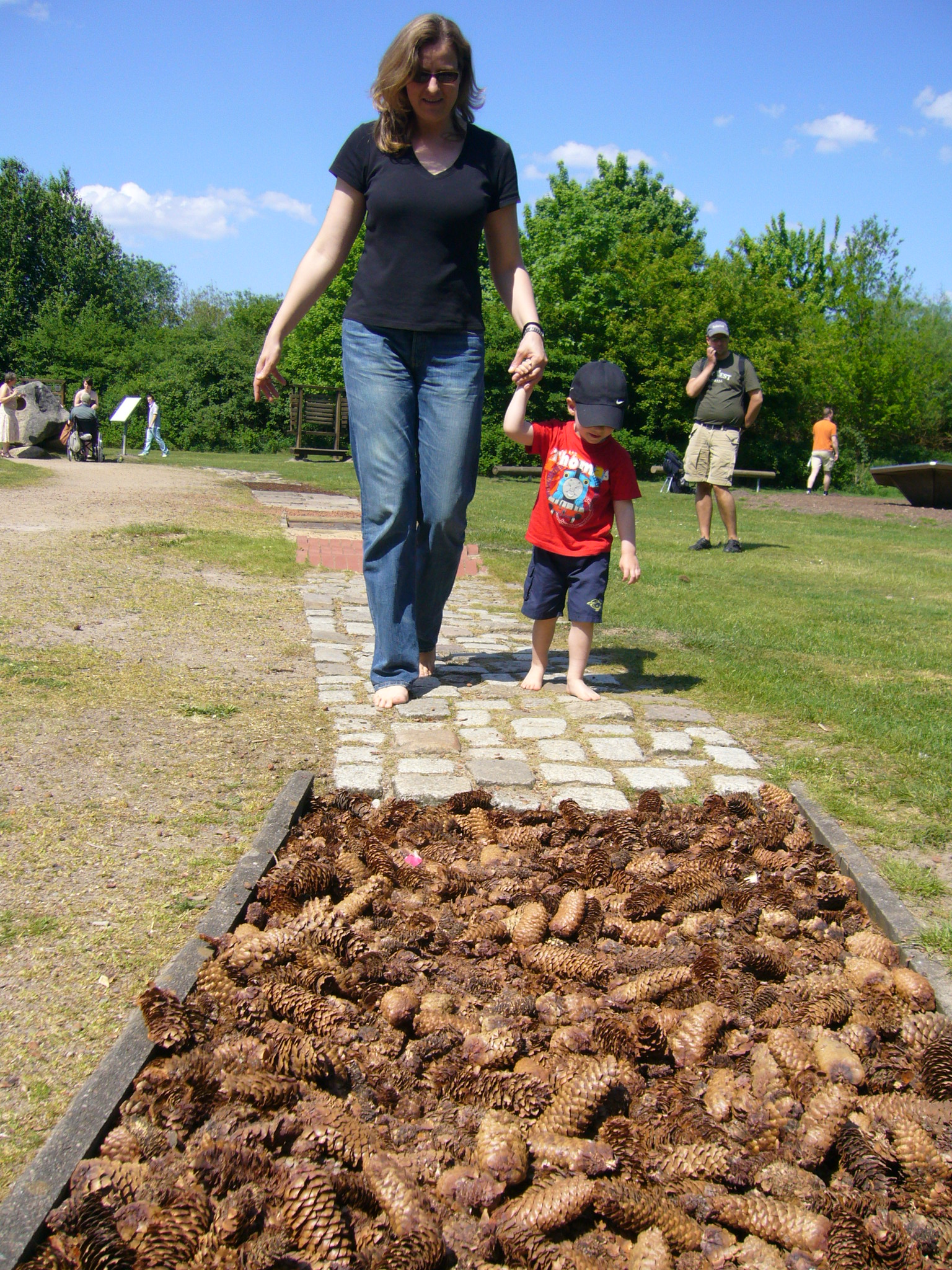
An experiential feature in the "World of the Senses" (Welt der Sinne). The design of this extensive sensory garden and house in Bremervörde, Germany, was inspired by the ideas of Hugo Kükelhaus (1900–1984) regarding "fields of experience for the development of the senses" and is intended for use by everyone, regardless of disabilities.

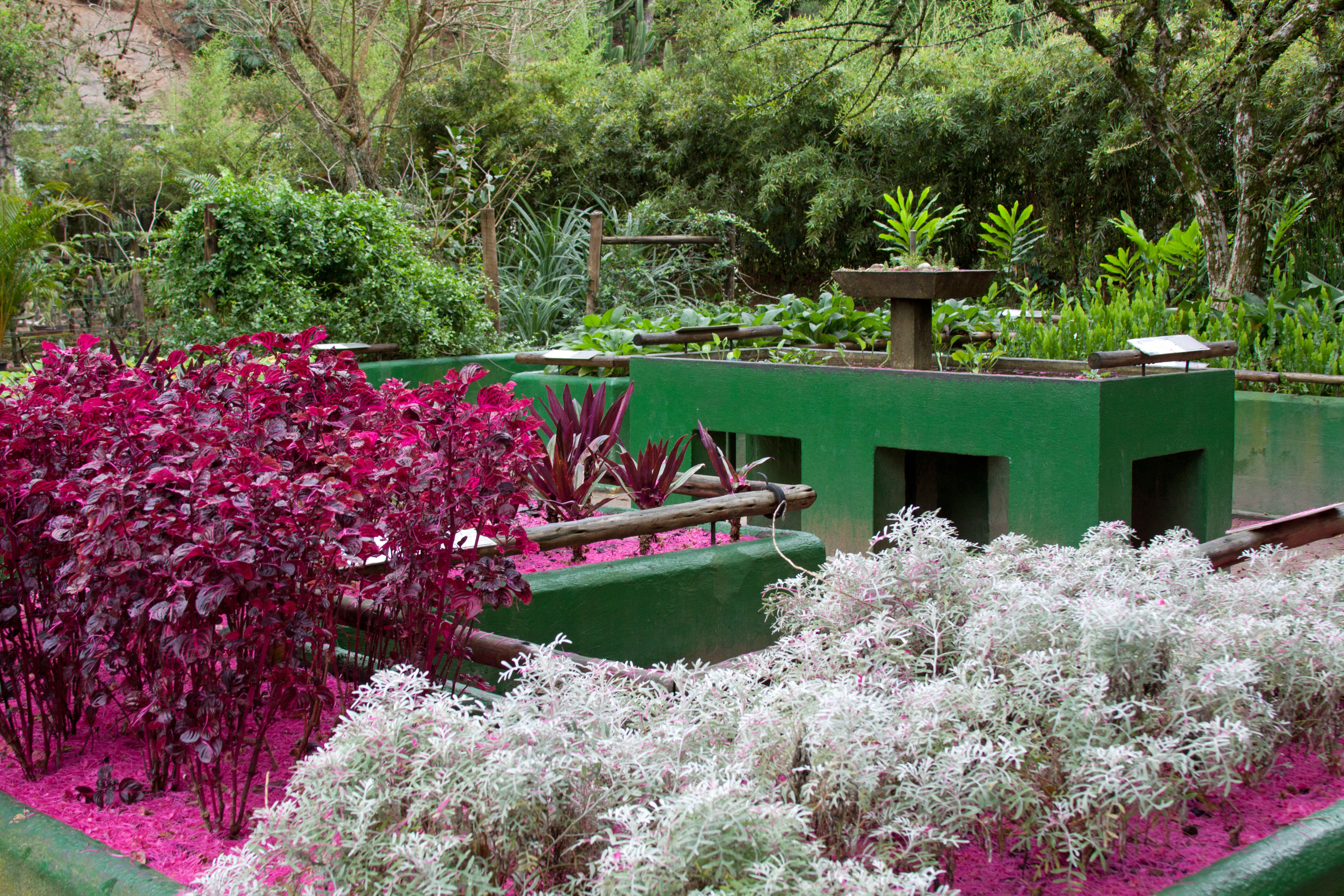
This sensory garden inside the Rio de Janeiro Botanical Garden, Brazil, is designed to sharpen the senses of touch and smell, and sometimes taste. Visitors with disabilities, including the blind and visually impaired, are welcomed by a team of counselors (some of whom are themselves visually disabled). Blindfolded guided tours are also a feature.

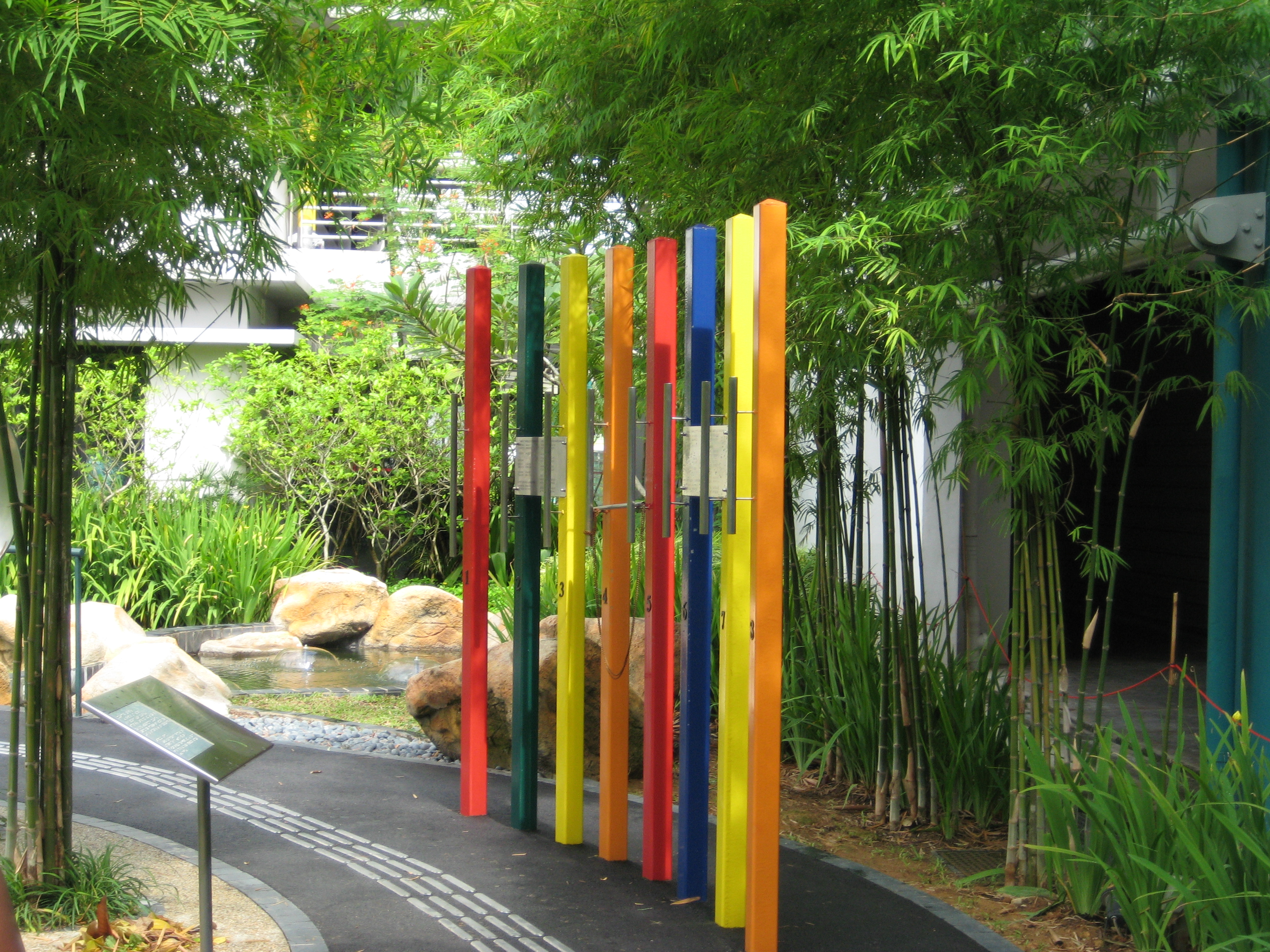
Musical pipes can be played by visitors in the sensory garden at the Building and Construction Authority Gallery, Singapore, which showcases the broad accessibility principles of Universal Design.

== See also ==
- List of sensory gardens
- List of garden types
- Garden design
- Intercultural Garden
- Sensory room
- Sensory tourism
- Smound
