= Muriel Zimmerman =

American occupational therapist

- Muriel Zimmerman, from a 1983 newspaper.
- Born: 1916; Lehman, Pennsylvania
- Died: September 25, 2014; Colonie, New York
- Occupation: Occupational therapist

Muriel Ellen Zimmerman (1916 – September 25, 2012) was an American occupational therapist, head of the Self-Help Device Unit at the Rusk Institute of Rehabilitation Medicine in New York City.

== Early life ==
Zimmerman was born in 1916, in Lehman, Pennsylvania, the daughter of Frederick U. Zimmerman and Mabel Ellen Dana Zimmerman. She trained as an occupational therapist at the Philadelphia School of Occupational Therapy.

== Career ==
Zimmerman was supervisor of occupational therapy and associate director at the Rusk Institute of Rehabilitation Medicine (IRM) in New York. She taught occupational therapy courses at New York University from 1956 to 1974. Her work as head of the institute's Self-Help Device Unit focused on creating devices for rehabilitation, including the universal cuff, the Swedish Arm Support (deltoid aid), and finger splints, and on introducing assistive technology to disabled users. She encouraged her clients to be resourceful in crafting their own tools and gadgets, including everyday self-care items such as tableware and clothing. She also established occupational therapy programs in other countries.

Zimmerman was author of Self-Help Devices for Rehabilitation (1958), and co-author of Living with a Disability (1953, with Howard Rusk and Eugene J. Taylor), and Functional Fashions for the Physically Handicapped (1961, with Helen Cookman). In 1960 she gave the Eleanor Clarke Slagle Lecture, titled "Devices: Development and Direction".

== Personal life ==
Zimmerman died in 2014, aged 98 years, in Colonie, New York.
