= Montessori High School at University Circle =

Location
- 11025 Magnolia Drive; Cleveland, (Cuyahoga County), Ohio 44106; United States
- Coordinates: 41°30′53.8″N 81°36′35″W

Information
- Type: Private School, Coeducational, High School
- Established: 2007
- Founder: David Kahn
- Closed: 2018
- Oversight: The Board
- Grades: 9-12
- Student to teacher ratio: 6:1
- Education system: "Montessori"
- Campus type: 0
- Mascot: Montessaurus Rex
- Nickname: "MHS"
- Yearbook: The Journey
- Affiliation: International Baccalaureate World School

Montessori High School at University Circle (also known as MHS) was a private high school located in the University Circle neighborhood of Cleveland, Ohio. The school opened August 2008 as the first private high school in the United States with the Montessori name, and was the first Montessori high school to offer boarding for international and U.S. students. On May 4, 2018, MHS announced that it would cease operations and liquidate its properties at the end of the 2017–18 academic year due to financial difficulties.

MHS combined Montessori education with the International Baccalaureate program, a demanding college-preparatory program stressing the classical liberal arts. MHS was one of five high schools in the United States to combine these educational approaches.

== Accreditation ==
Montessori High School at University Circle was a member of the Cleveland Council of Independent Schools, was chartered by the State of Ohio, and was recognized as an official World School by International Baccalaureate.

=== Diploma options ===
In addition to earning the MHS diploma, student could earn International Baccalaureate certificates and diploma in selected International Baccalaureate courses.

Students could sit for exams to earn certificates in any of the six subjects: English, Math, Science, 20th-Century World History, Art, or World Language. Students who achieved a qualifying score would earn a certificate in that subject. IB certificates mark the successful culmination of an area of study for students, and are an achievement in themselves.

=== Lillard Hall ===
Now the Science and Mathematics building, Lillard Hall was originally the private residence of Dr. Gordon Morrill.

The Federalist style building was designed in 1910 by renowned architect Charles F. Schweinfurth, who designed homes on Cleveland’s Millionaire's Row, the Old Stone Church, Trinity Cathedral, the Union Club, Cuyahoga County Courthouse, and the stone bridges along Martin Luther King Jr. Blvd. It is the only private residence Schweinfurth built, and is known as one of the most beautiful mansions in University Circle.

The building was converted to house classrooms, offices, music rooms, and libraries shortly after it was acquired by MHS in 2007. Lillard Hall is located at 11025 Magnolia Drive, Cleveland.

=== The Science Lab ===
The two-car garage that sits behind Lillard Hall was also converted, and functioned as the school's self-sustaining science laboratory and greenhouse. The lab not only supported science classes at MHS, but it also supports the MHS Garden Squad, which maintains the school garden.

=== Ferris House ===
The humanities and foreign language building, Ferris House, was originally built in 1937. Ferris House was acquired by MHS in 2009, and renovations were completed the following winter. The building houses classrooms, a full-service kitchen and lunchroom, and a multi-media art studio. The house's original garage was converted into a theatre classroom.

MHS also added a hoop-style greenhouse and a picnic area in the backyard.

=== The Otis Boarding House ===
Completed in 1918, Otis House was a single-family residence and remained so until the 1980s, when it was converted into condominiums. Otis House went on to serve as the MHS residential house for boarding students. MHS residential guides also lived in the house, and helped students learn independent living skills. It is located at 10923 Magnolia Drive, Cleveland.

=== The Carriage House ===
Converted at the same time as the main house, the Carriage House originally served as stables for the Otis family. It is located behind Otis House.

=== The Friends' House ===
MHS partnered with the Cleveland Friends Meeting and Montessori Development Partnerships to have access to additional space in the Friends' House in 2015. The house is owned by the Cleveland Friends Meeting, and used weekly as a worship space for the Quakers. Though MHS is not affiliated with the Quakers, the space had been used to house community meeting, student art galleries, and offices.

== University Circle Institutional Partnerships ==
Noteworthy affiliations included:

- Cleveland Museum of Art
- Cleveland Museum of Natural History
- Cleveland Botanical Garden
- Western Reserve Historical Society
- Cleveland Institute of Music
- Cleveland Institute of Art
- Case Western Reserve University
- University Circle Inc
- Museum of Contemporary Art Cleveland
- Judson Manor
- The Music Settlement

As one of over 40 University Circle, Inc. member institutions, MHS was surrounded by organizations that bring a distinct scientific, artistic, historic, or cultural focus to student life and learning in the Circle. In 2015, MHS announced that all music courses would be offered through The Music Settlement and will be taught by Settlement faculty members.

== History ==
Montessori High School at University Circle was founded by a group of Montessori educators and supporters. These individuals worked in concert with a national movement to expand Montessori education at the middle and high school level.

After more than a year of planning and development, MHS opened its doors to 37 students, including 17 boarding students, in August 2008. At that time, the campus consisted of two houses, Lillard Hall and Otis House, on the north side of Magnolia Drive. In 2009, MHS was recognized as an International Baccalaureate World School (IB), and has since offered the IB Diploma Programme. In 2009, a third house was added on the south side of Magnolia to accommodate steadily expanding enrollment. The first graduating class consisted of 8 students in 2010. By Fall 2011, 80 students were enrolled at MHS, open to grades 9th through 12th.

MHS went on to maintain approximately 100 students, 20 percent of whom lived on campus. In May 2017, MHS reported that ownership of Lillard Hall, Ferris House, and the Otis Boarding House would be transferred to the school. The following year, on May 4, 2018, Montessori High School announced in an email to parents that they would be ceasing operations at the end of the 2017–2018 school year. The reason for closure was that the school had been operating at a significant deficit, and that the board had realized the school could not continue operation with accumulating deficits. Tuition deposits and prepaid tuition for the 2018–2019 school year were refunded, and students, faculty, and staff were forced to find new schools and employment for the following school year. The final school day was June 1, 2018, and the school officially shut down on June 30.

Tempe Union proposed opening a Montessori High School by 2013. According to an article in the Arizona Republic, "[Superintendent Kenneth Baca] is looking at Montessori High School at University Circle in Cleveland as a model for ideas, and he hopes to take district staff, a school-board member and interested community members to visit the school in the fall." Other Montessori schools throughout the country have used MHS as a model.
