= Cleveland Botanical Garden =

Botanical garden located in Cleveland, Ohio, US

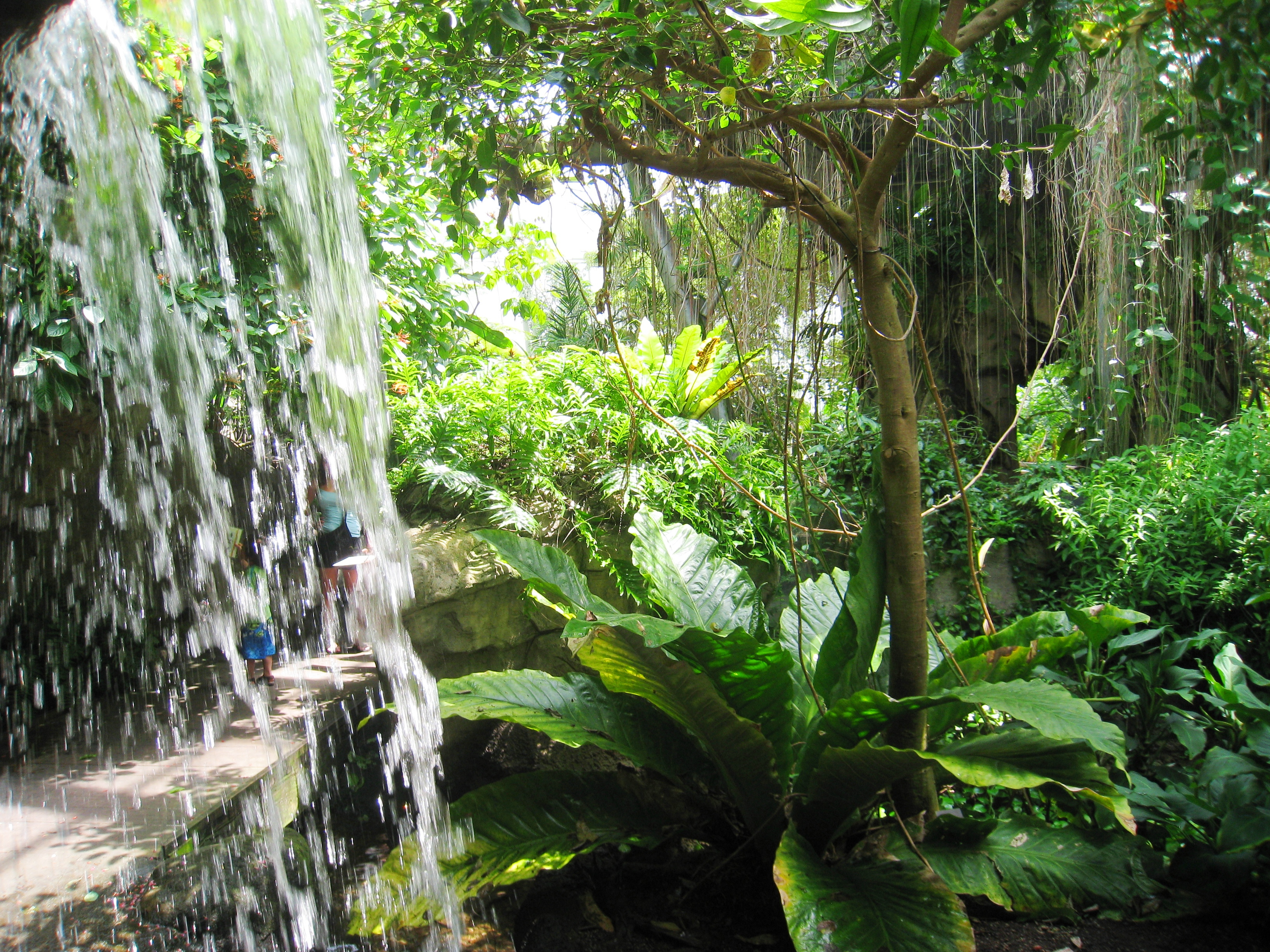
- The Costa Rican rainforest as replicated in The Eleanor Armstrong Smith Glasshouse at the Cleveland Botanical Garden
- Interactive map of Cleveland Botanical Garden
- Location: Cleveland, Ohio
- Coordinates: 41°30′39.05″N 81°36′34.04″W
- Established: 1930
- Website: holdenfg.org

The Cleveland Botanical Garden, located in the University Circle neighborhood of Cleveland, Ohio, in the United States.

== History ==
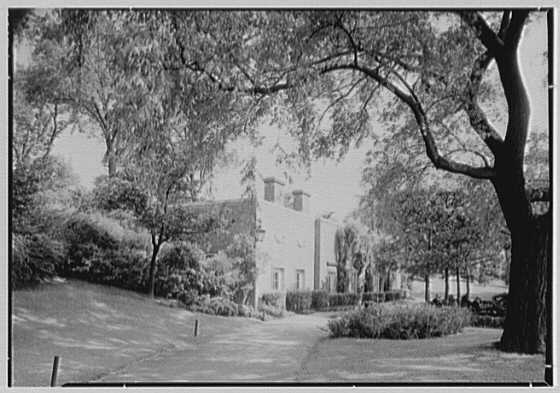
Outside view of the Garden Center.

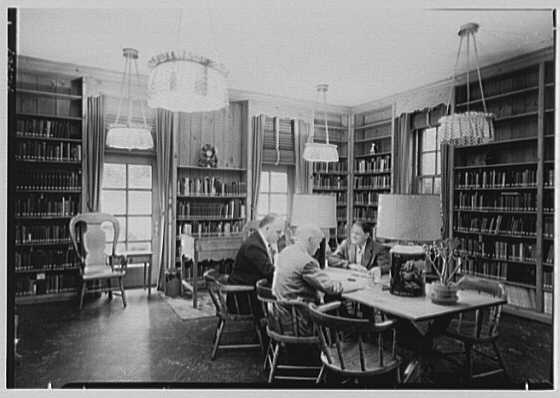
Inside the horticultural library.

The origins of the Cleveland Botanical Gardens began to bloom in 1916 when Eleanor Squire donated horticultural books to the Garden Club in Cleveland. The garden itself was founded in 1930 as the Garden Center of Greater Cleveland. It was the first such civic garden in an American city. Originally housed in a converted boathouse on Wade Park Lagoon, the center served as a horticultural library, offering classes and workshops for gardeners and spearheading beautification projects in the community.

In 1966 having outgrown its original home, the Garden Center moved to its present location in University Circle, the site of the old Cleveland Zoo. Remnants of the old bear pit still remain in the Ohio Woodland Garden. The move occurred after nearly six years of heavy springtime flooding in University Circle. That same year, the boathouse was damaged from the onslaught of flooding and the boathouse was demolished. Due to the damage to the boathouse and other structures in University Circle, a city initiative to install sewers and interceptors to control future flooding were installed near the Circle.

In 1994, the organization's Board of Trustees changed the name from Garden Center of Greater Cleveland to Cleveland Botanical Garden to reflect a dramatically expanded mission and launched an ambitious capital campaign to develop a facility that would support the enhanced program agenda. The expanded and renovated building, designed by Graham Gund Architects of Cambridge, Massachusetts, opened to the public in July 2003. The Cleveland Botanical Garden expanded again in 2014 when it joined forces with the Holden Arboretum. The two entities joined and became Holden Forest & Gardens. As of 2024, visitors of the Cleveland Botanical Garden can enjoy the extensive horticultural museum, special events, an indoor-outdoor all season botanical experience, and much more. The Gardens also supports environmental research, community outreach, and urban farming programs.

== Facilities ==
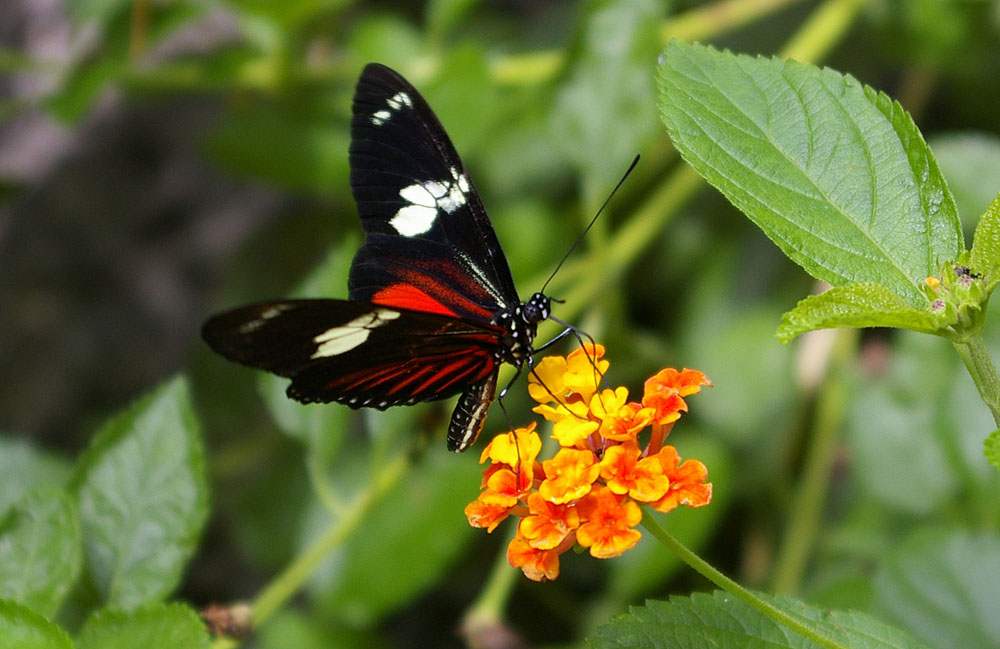
Heliconius doris Linnaeus butterfly in the Costa Rican glass house

The centerpiece of the $50 million 2003 expansion is The Eleanor Armstrong Smith Glasshouse, a 17,000 square foot (1,700 m²) conservatory home to plant and animal life from two separate biomes, the spiny desert of Madagascar and the cloud forest of Costa Rica. They feature over 350 species of plants and 50 species of animals, including hundreds of butterflies.

There are also 10 acres (40,000 m^{2}) of gardens, including the award-winning Hershey Children's Garden (the first children's garden in Ohio), the Elizabeth and Nona Evans Restorative Garden, the David and Paula Swetland Topiary Garden, the Western Reserve Herb Society Garden, the Japanese Garden, the Sears-Swetland Rose Garden, the Ohio Woodland, the C.K. "Pat" Patrick Perennial Border, and the public Campsey-Stauffer Gateway Garden.

== Gallery ==
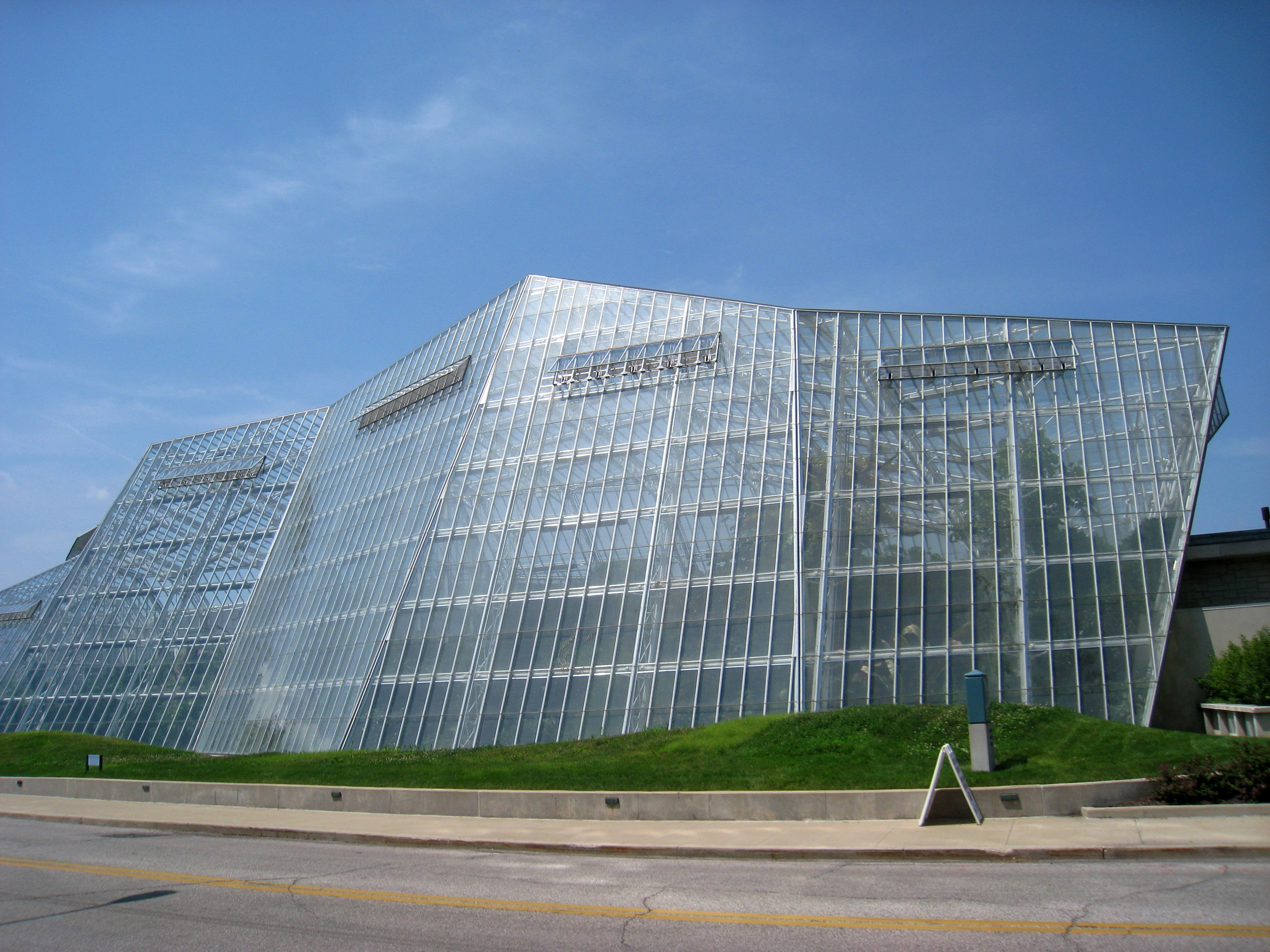
East facade.

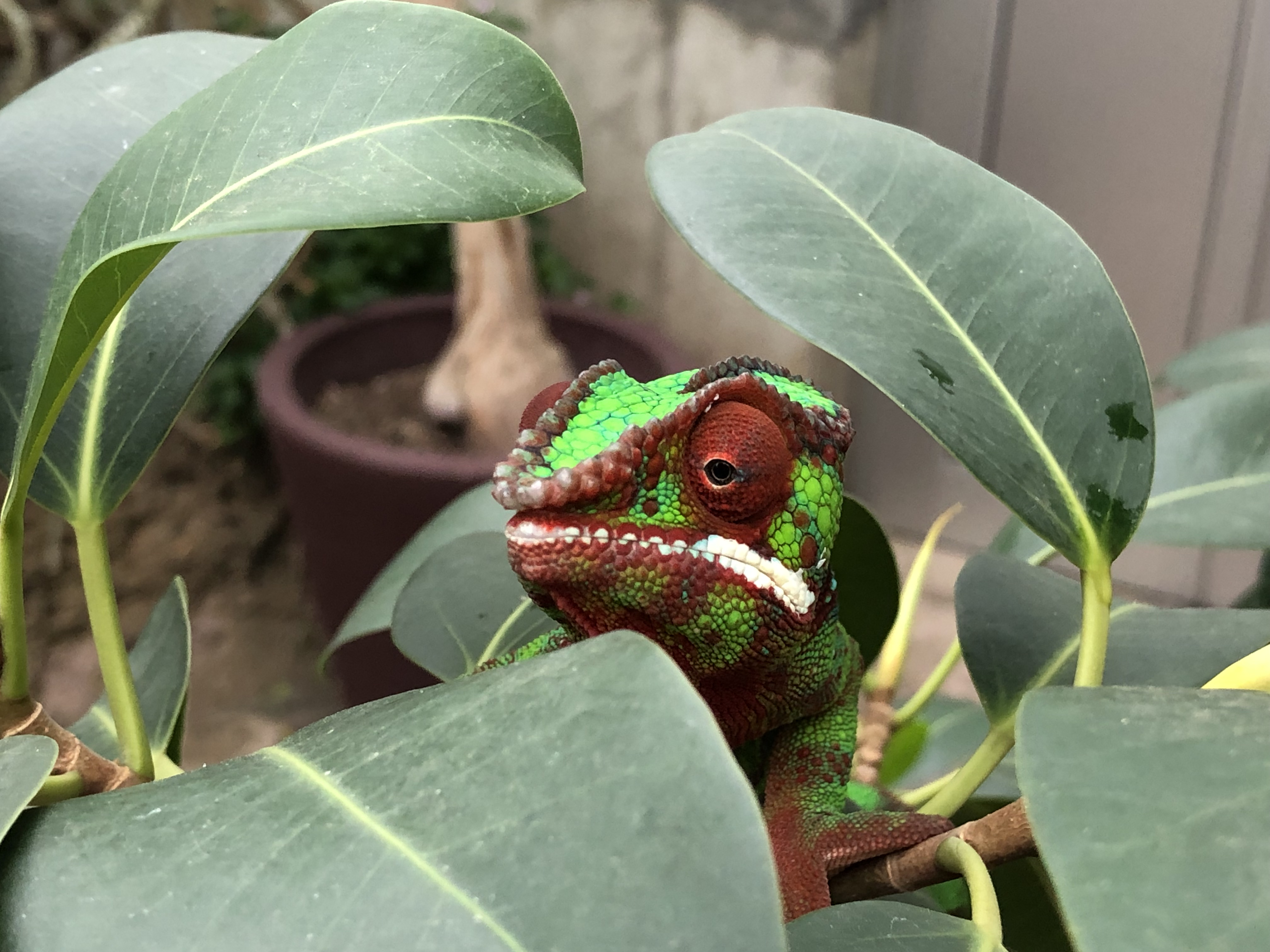
A chameleon in a garden.

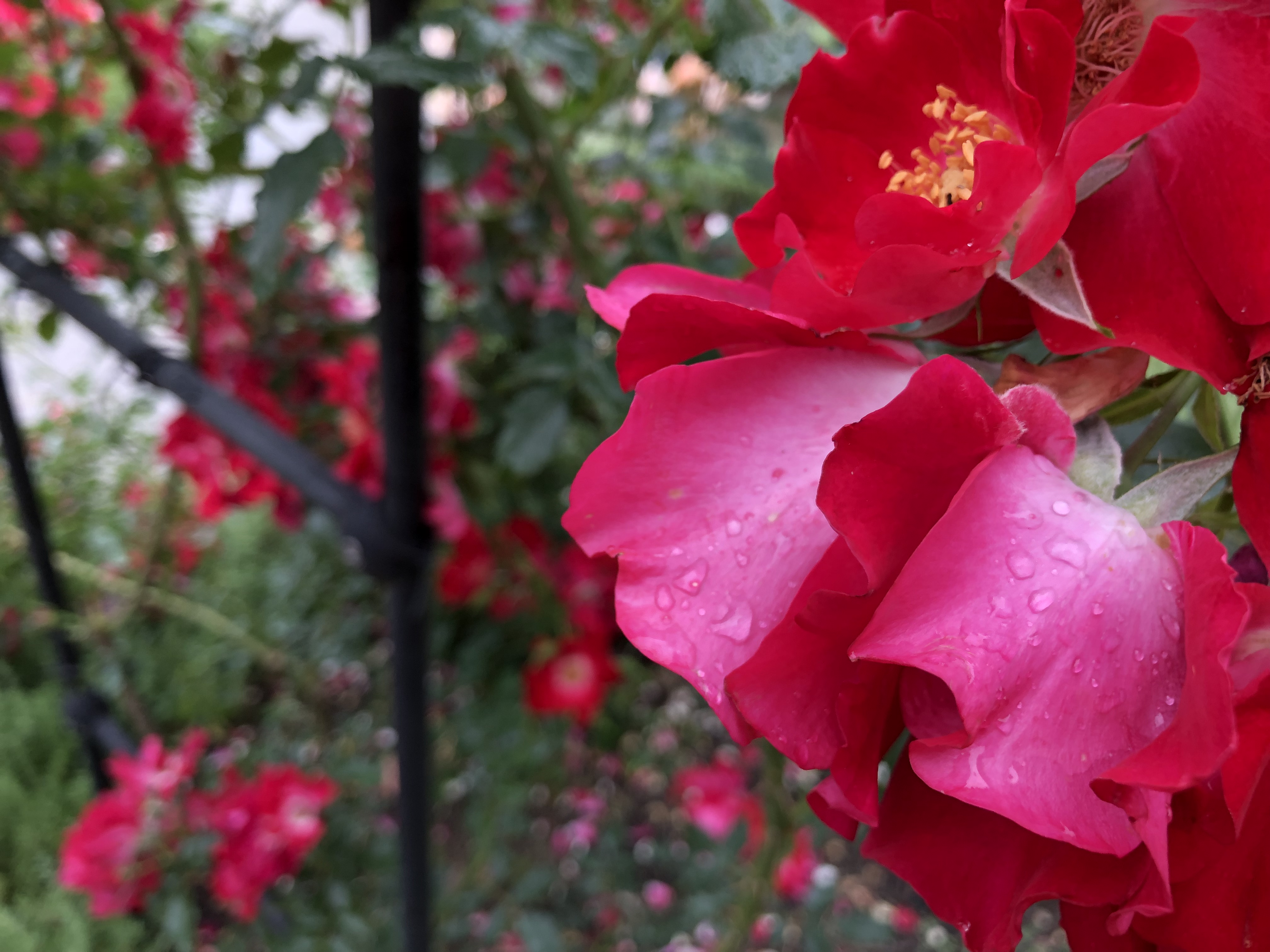
Close-up of some flowers.

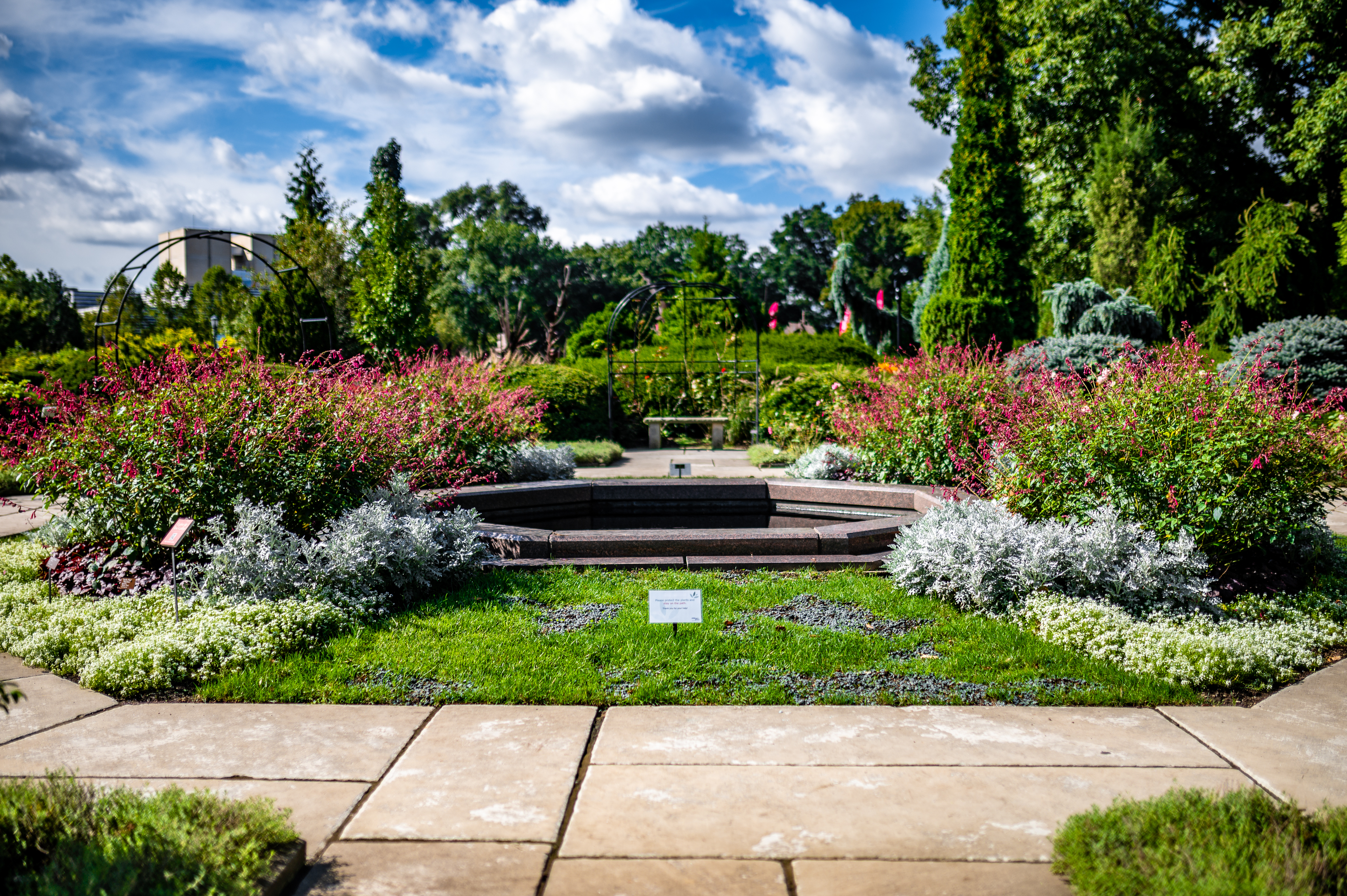
Part of the outside garden area.

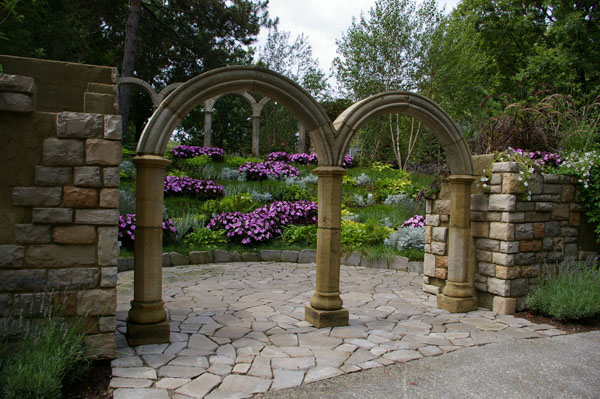
A themed garden area.

== Awards ==
The Vail Medal is awarded for "significant national contributions to the field of horticulture" Past winners include Lynden B. Miller

== In popular culture ==
The gardens were featured in a fifth-season episode of Supernatural, titled "Dark Side of the Moon".

== See also ==
- List of botanical gardens in the United States
