= Enid A. Haupt Glass Garden =

Former therapeutic garden in Manhattan, New York

Coordinates: 40°44′36″N 73°58′23.6″W

The Enid A. Haupt Glass Garden opened in 1959 as part of the Rusk Institute of Rehabilitation Medicine at New York University Medical Center. It provided horticultural therapy for patients, but was also open to the public. It was contained in a 17,000-square-foot (1,600 m^{2}) greenhouse located near the southeast corner of the intersection of 34th Street and First Avenue in the Kips Bay section of Manhattan, New York City. The garden was a gift from Enid A. Haupt.

The facility was the first of its kind designed to be fully accessible to wheelchairs and hosted more than 100,000 visitors per year, mostly consisting of patients at the hospital and their families. An outdoor perennial garden opened adjacent to the greenhouse in 1991, which was also made possible by a donation from Enid A. Haupt. A children's garden was added to the facility in 1998.

The garden was destroyed by flooding from Hurricane Sandy in October 2012 and was not replaced because it was originally planned to be demolished to make way for construction of the medical center's Kimmel Pavilion, which opened in 2018.

== See also ==
- Enid A. Haupt Conservatory at the New York Botanical Garden
- Enid A. Haupt Garden at the Smithsonian Institution
