= Rusk Institute of Rehabilitation Medicine =

Hospital in Manhattan, New York, U.S.

Rusk Rehabilitation
- NYU Langone Health System
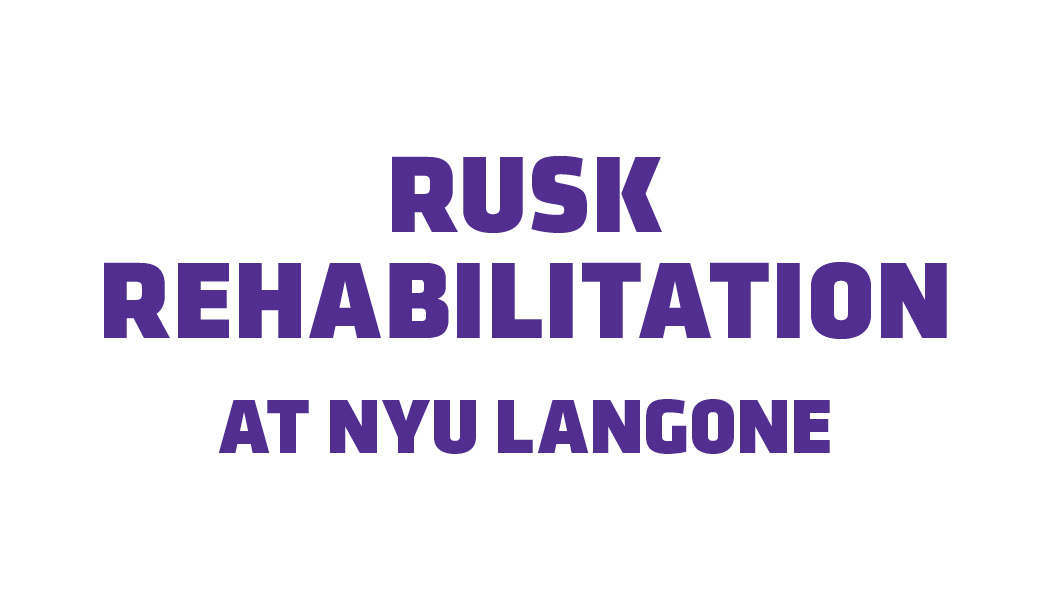

Geography
- Location: 550 First Avenue, New York, New York, United States
- Coordinates: 40.742969°N 73.973168°W

Organization
- Care system: Private
- Type: Specialist
- Affiliated university: NYU School of Medicine
- Network: NYU Langone Health System

Services
- Beds: 174
- Speciality: Rehabilitation medicine

History
- Founded: 1948

Links
- Website: rusk.med.nyu.edu nyulangone.org/rusk
- Lists: Hospitals in New York State

Rusk Rehabilitation is among the largest university-affiliated academic centers devoted entirely to inpatient/outpatient care, research, and training in rehabilitation medicine for both adults and pediatric patients. The system is part of the NYU Langone Medical Center and operated under the auspices of the Department of Rehabilitation Medicine of the New York University School of Medicine. The Rusk Institute is named in honor of its founder, Howard A. Rusk.

The Rusk Institute has been voted the best rehabilitation hospital in New York and among the top ten in the country since 1989, when U.S. News & World Report introduced its annual "Best Hospitals" rankings.

As of 2008 Steven Flanagan is the chairman of rehabilitation medicine and medical director of the Rusk Institute.

== History ==
Dr. Howard A. Rusk founded the Institute for Rehabilitation Medicine in 1948. His experience treating wounded soldiers during World War II led him to develop the institute around the philosophy that the patients are to be cared for as an entire person, not only the physical disability or illness. In 1984, the institute was renamed so in his honor.

The institute opened at interim quarters located at 325 East 38th Street on June 17, 1948. It remained at that location until January 1951, when its new facility opened at 400 East 34th Street, between First Avenue and FDR Drive, the first building to be completed in the development of the New York University-Bellevue Medical Center (now the NYU Langone Medical Center).

== Facilities ==
Rusk is based out of its wing of the NYU Langone Main Campus, but additionally provides rehabilitation services at three other main locations and nearly a dozen other satellite locations:

- Langone Orthopedic Hospital at 301 East 17th Street (inpatient adult rehab and inpatient and outpatient pediatric rehab)
- Ambulatory Care Center at 240 East 38th Street (outpatient adult rehab)
- Langone Orthopedic Center at 333 East 38th Street (outpatient adult orthopedic/musculoskeletal rehab)

== See also ==
- The New York Foundation
- Muriel Zimmerman
- Enid A. Haupt Glass Garden
