= Steven Flanagan =

American physician

Steven R. Flanagan is a nationally renowned expert in the field of traumatic brain injury (TBI) and is professor and chairman of the Department of Rehabilitation Medicine at the New York University School of Medicine, and the medical director of the Rusk Institute of Rehabilitation Medicine at the NYU Langone Medical Center.

He was formerly the vice chair of the Department of Rehabilitation Medicine, Mount Sinai School of Medicine where he was a faculty member from 1992 to 2008. He was also the medical director of the Brain Injury Rehabilitation Program which encompassed the physical, cognitive and emotional aftermaths of brain injuries. Under Flanagan's leadership, the National Institute on Disability and Rehabilitation Research designated the program a TBI Model System recognizing it as a national leader in brain injury medical research and patient care.

He holds a major TBI grant from the National Institute on Disability and Rehabilitation Research; is chairman of the Brain Injury Special Interest Group of the American Academy of Physical Medicine and Rehabilitation (PM&R); and is a member of the Medical Advisory Board of the Brain Trauma Foundation.

In 2008, the Brain Injury Association of New York State honored Flanagan with the "Champion of Hope Award" for his work in the field of traumatic brain injury.

He received his B.S. from Fairfield University in 1984 and his M.D. from University of Medicine and Dentistry of New Jersey in 1988. He completed his residency training in Physical Medicine and Rehabilitation, Mount Sinai School of Medicine in 1992.
