= Howard A. Rusk =

- Born: April 9, 1901; Brookfield, Missouri
- Died: November 4, 1989 (aged 88); New York, New York
- Education: University of Pennsylvania; University of Missouri
- Known for: Founder of rehabilitation medicine
- Scientific career
- Fields: physician
- Workplaces: Washington University in St. Louis

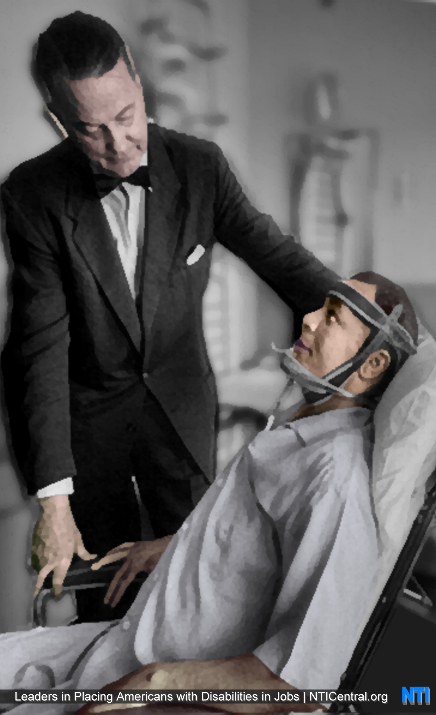
Dr. Howard A. Rusk and Roy Campanella

Howard A. Rusk (April 9, 1901 – November 4, 1989) was a prominent American physician and founder of the Rusk Institute of Rehabilitation Medicine. He is considered to be the founder of rehabilitation medicine.

Born in Brookfield, Missouri, Rusk was active in the Health for Peace movement in the 1950s and supported US efforts to participate more in rehabilitation medicine in international affairs. He was the first recipient of the Pacem in Terris award of the Pope John Paul II Center of Prayer and Study for Peace.

== Education ==
Rusk graduated from the University of Missouri in 1923 and received his medical degree at Pennsylvania School of Medicine in 1925. He completed his internship at St. Luke's hospital in St. Louis.

== Early career ==
From 1926 to 1942, Rusk practiced internal medicine in St. Louis, becoming a teacher at Washington University School of Medicine, staff physician at Barnes-Jewish Hospital, and chairman of the Intern Committee at St. Luke's, where he had trained as an intern. In 1942, Rusk left his practice to join the Air Force. He initially served as chief of medical services at Jefferson Barracks, Missouri. He soon developed a convalescent program for those who had recovered from their illness but were not yet ready to resume their military training. In 1943, Rusk participated on rehabilitation subcommittee of the Baruch Committee on Physical Medicine. Rusk soon went on to establish the first Air Force rehabilitation center, in Pawling, New York, which was to treat airmen returning from battle with physical and psychological disabilities. Rusk described it as "a combination of a hospital, a country club, a school, a farm, a vocational training center, a resort and a little bit of home as well." During the remainder of World War II, a total of 12 such centers were to be opened by the Air Force. With the influence of Bernard Baruch, Rusk convinced President Roosevelt to start rehabilitation programs for all military branches. In 1945, Rusk was part of the American entourage to attend the Potsdam Conference. While on this trip, he discussed rehabilitation medicine with General Bradley. Subsequently, he provided consultation to the VA on the organization of a rehabilitation program following the war.

== Leadership in rehabilitation ==
After the war, Rusk unsuccessfully tried to establish a rehabilitation institute within Washington University. Nonetheless, in December 1945 Rusk moved to New York City, accepting an offer from New York University to establish a department of Rehabilitation and Physical Medicine. He also accepted an offer, extended by Arthur Hays Sulzberger, to work for The New York Times as a weekly medical columnist. In 1947, Rusk joined with George Deaver, another pioneer of rehabilitation medicine, to establish a rehabilitation center at Bellevue Hospital, the first of its kind for civilians. In 1951, Rusk founded the Institute of Medical Rehabilitation at New York University, at which he served for 33 years. The American Legion lists Rusk as having the nickname "Dr. Live-Again".

== Legacy ==
- In 1950, Rusk founded the Institute of Physical Medicine and Rehabilitation, New York University Medical Center. The Institute was later renamed Institute of Rehabilitation Medicine and in 1984, NYU honored Rusk and renamed it Rusk Institute of Rehabilitation Medicine.
- University of Missouri Health Care's Rusk Rehabilitation Hospital in Columbia, Missouri was named in his honor.
- In 1952, Rusk received the Albert Lasker Public Service Award (today, it is Lasker–Bloomberg Public Service Award) with Brock Chisholm
- In 1952, Rusk was inducted as an Associate Fellow in the prestigious National Academy of Kinesiology (formerly American Academy of Physical Education; American Academy of Kinesiology and Physical Education).
- In 1954, Rusk was elected as the President of the American-Korean Foundation.
- In 1955, Rusk founded the World Rehabilitation Fund.
- In 1964, Soong Mei-ling, also known as Madame Chiang Kai-shek, sent a private airplane for Rusk and four other rehabilitation experts to visit Taiwan. Three years later, Cheng Hsin Rehabilitation Medical Center, specialized in poliomyelitis (often called polio or infantile paralysis), was established in 1967.
- Rusk's autobiography A World To Care For: The Autobiography of Howard A. Rusk, M.D. was published in 1972.
- In 1977, Rusk received the Award for Greatest Public Service Benefiting the Disadvantaged, an award given out annually by Jefferson Awards.
- NYU Langone Health’s Rusk Rehabilitation is named after him.
