= Sensory tourism =

Form of tourism for visually impaired people

Sensory tourism is a form of tourism, that caters for people with vision impairment. Those suffering from vision impairment face many difficulties based around mainstream tourism such as access to information, navigation, safety and the knowledge of others around them. This has caused the visionless members of society to travel much less than those with no vision impairment. Combining the theories behind tourism in terms of its psychology and its relation to the senses, an inclusive experience for the visually disabled was developed. Sensory tourism engages the physical and multi-sensory aspects of tourism, enhancing the tourism experience specifically for those with, but also benefitting those without vision impairment.

== The psychology of tourism ==
Historically, regular tourism is heavily focused on sightseeing, rather than memories and experiences gained from travelling. Based on recent reviews of the psychology of tourism, it is argued that a tourists experience of a place is based upon the individuals memory, which is actively shaped by what they see, but also what they “hear, smell, touch and taste.” In order to build a pleasurable tourism experience for those who are vision impaired, but also those who are not, discovery of a place should be based on “social and cultural” experiences. Adding to this, the traveller’s anticipation and participation for future trips are based on previous "emotions, satisfactions, and memories of experiences prior," which can often be a barrier faced by visually impaired travellers.

Briefly, psychology is the "study of the mind and behaviour," which can be easily applied to tourism. It can be said that tourism companies should be "most interested in how tourists think, feel and behave." This is because, generally, psychology is based around a vast range of ideas, these mainly being "theories and methods" for explaining human behaviour and experience, which can in turn be applied to, and effect a tourist's experience. This "breadth and intense scrutiny of human behaviour" can be a rich resource in understanding the factors that make up a positive experience that a tourist undertakes. Applying psychology to the context of sensory tourism, a travelling experience for someone with vision impairment should be “considered as a dynamic and reflective process”. This allows those with sight issues a chance to experience a place with their other active senses, leading to further excitement for future tourism experiences. Through enhanced interaction with “physical, social, and virtual environmental stimuli,” the visually impaired can base their travel experience on psychological factors other than sight.

== The senses in tourism ==
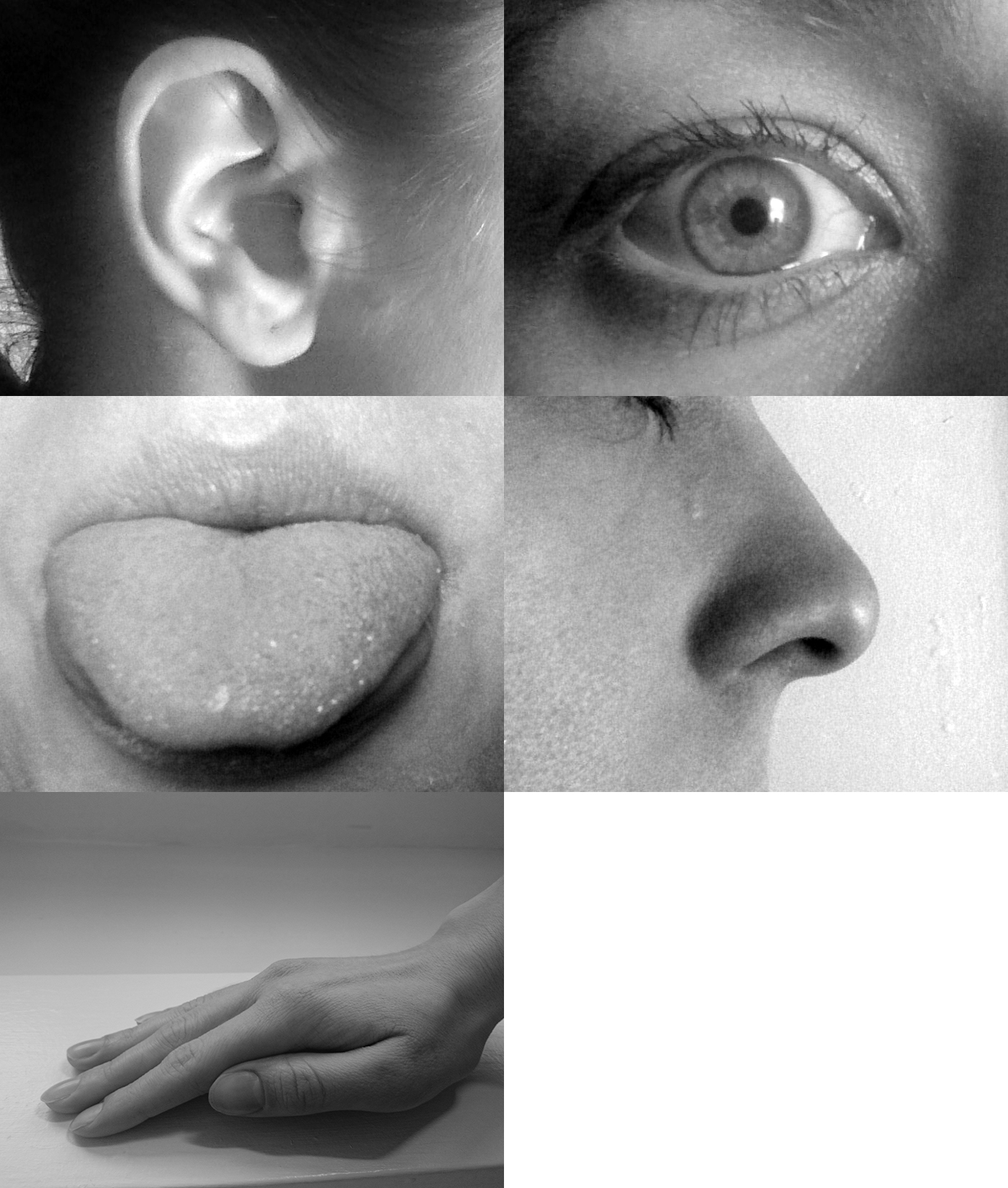
The five senses (hearing, sight, taste, smell and touch) and their respective sensory organs inherent among Homo sapiens

The senses within the body are how information is collected about a person’s surroundings. In terms of tourism, the “bodily states, situated actions, and mental simulations are used to generate our cognitive activity,” which leads to a tourist having certain memories and attitudes toward places they visit (Krishna, 2012). The senses are considered to be the foundations of how tourists interact with their surroundings, and how they create opinions and make sense of these surroundings. Consequently, the design of sensory tourism should be based around the foundations of knowledge surrounding the bodily senses. Applying an understanding of the senses to tourism for those with vision impairment will enhance their travelling experience through “tactility, aroma, movement and sound,” which allows them to build a positive relationship between the place that they visit, and the meaning associated with that place. Hence, more attention needs to be paid more toward the senses rather than just the visual tourism experience, to ensure these people can still gain an “enriched experience” of places they visit. In turn, those with impaired vision will be able to broaden their horizons.

Diagram showing the parts of the brain

In more scientific terms, the human body uses its nervous system in order to react to certain experiences gained from tourism. Theoretically, this works as a sequence of reactions leading to our brain toward making a perception of the world around us, hence, the senses are a very important aspect of tourism. Each of the five senses are connected to a body part or a sensing organ. For example, sight is perceived by the eyes, taste is detected by tastebuds, smell comes from chemicals floating in the air reaching receptors in the nose, touch is received by neural receptors in the skin and finally, hearing is the perception of sound, in which vibrations in the air are perceived by mechanoreceptors in the ear. Once a stimulus is detected at one of these sensing organs of the body, the message is relayed through the “peripheral nervous system to the central nervous system,” to the part of the brain that detects the relevant sense. In terms of what part of the brain in which the senses are processed, smell is “sent directly to the olfactory bulb,” “visual information is processed in the visual cortex of the occipital lobe”, “sound is processed in the auditory cortex of the temporal lobe”, “smells are processed in the olfactory cortex of the temporal lobe”, touch is “processed in the somatosensory cortex of the parietal lobe” and "taste is processed in the gustatory cortex in the parietal lobe.”

In terms of the senses giving someone a perception of a place, the certain senses relayed from the sensory organ, through the nervous system, to the brain for a response will give someone a unique awareness of the place in which they visit. The sensory signals will be relayed from the sensory organ to the brain, in which this information can be stored as a part of an individual’s memory. In terms of tourism, when someone remembers something about a place that they have visited, either a scene, smell, taste, feeling or something they heard, the “sensory processing areas in the brain become activated.” These sensory inputs will also cause us to remember something about a place, causing both positive or negative memories associated with this place to resurface. Once again, this means that all senses, not just sight should be considered by tourism companies in order for both visionless and visioned tourists alike to have the most enhanced experience of a place they visit.

== A gap in the market ==
Tourism companies have struggled to adapt to changing industry needs and have “failed to engage seriously with disability issues,” which leads to a negative connotation with visited areas by those of whom choose to visit. World Health Organization estimates that in 2012 there were 285 million people suffering from vision impairment worldwide. As Packer rightfully explains, people with disabilities “have the right to fully participate in the community,” and they should be able to “enjoy the same quality of life” as those without. It goes without saying that this includes tourism, but research shows that people with vision impairment are not travelling as frequently as those without.

This infrequency of vision impaired people travelling is due to the complexity and difficulty of travelling with vision impairment. There are four main factors that create a barrier between tourism and those with vision impairment, these being “accessing information, navigating the physical environment – safety, knowledge and attitudes of others [and] travelling with a Guide Dog.” There is “additional energy required to access” the information needed for those with vision impairment to travel, which makes it difficult for people to access resources and extra help in order to gain the most out of their travel experience, as well as allowing them to gain a positive psychological connotation to their place of visit. Without guidance from knowledgeable people or appropriate animal assistance, navigating foreign terrain can be difficult but also dangerous for visually impaired tourists. Another barrier for travellers that have impaired vision is the limited knowledge and attitudes towards others, which can sometimes cause feelings of exclusion. It is important that tourism companies “manage their tourist experiences closely and constantly,” in order to provide those with visual impairment an enjoyable experience. The tourism industry must understand the psychology and sensory aspects of tourism if “quality accessible experiences are to be available for tourists with vision impairment.”
