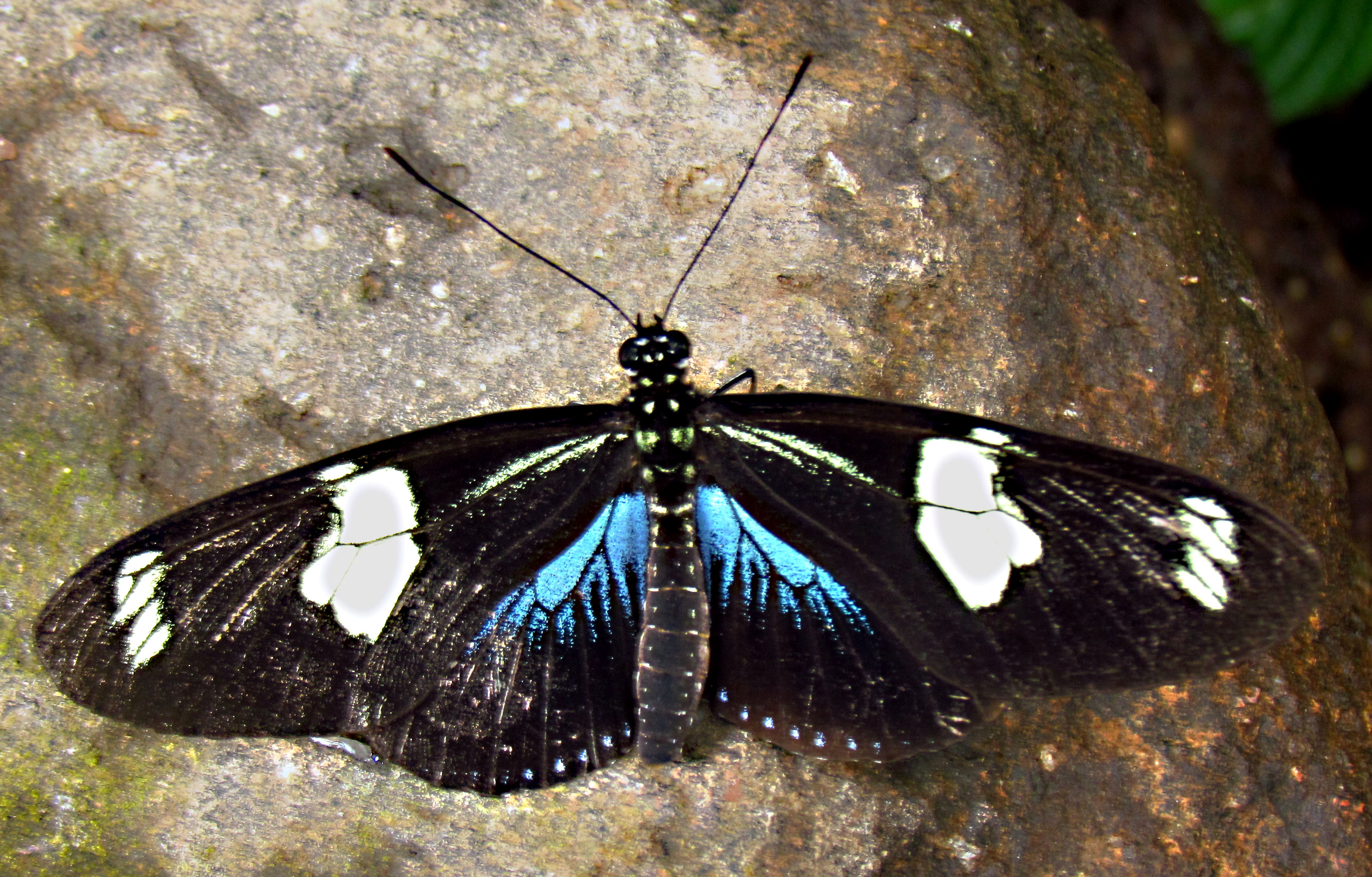
- Heliconius doris doris, Quito, Ecuador
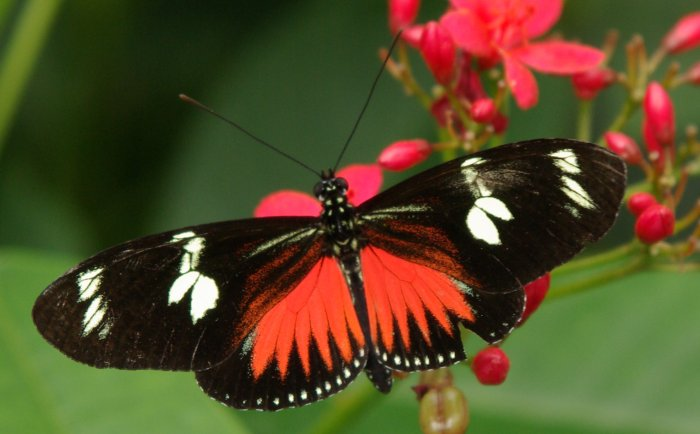
- Heliconius doris viridis

Scientific classification
- Kingdom: Animalia
- Phylum: Arthropoda
- Clade: Pancrustacea
- Class: Insecta
- Order: Lepidoptera
- Family: Nymphalidae
- Genus: Heliconius
- Species: H. doris

Binomial name
- Heliconius doris (Linnaeus, 1771)

Synonyms
- Papilio erato Linnaeus, 1758; Papilio doris Linnaeus, 1771; Laparus doris (Linnaeus, 1771); Papilio quirina Cramer, [1775]; Papilio amathusia Cramer, [1777]; Nereis delila Hübner, [1813]; Migonitis crenis Hübner, 1816; Crenis brylle Hübner, 1821; Heliconia dorimena Doubleday, 1847; Heliconius mars Staudinger, 1885

= Heliconius doris =

Species of butterfly

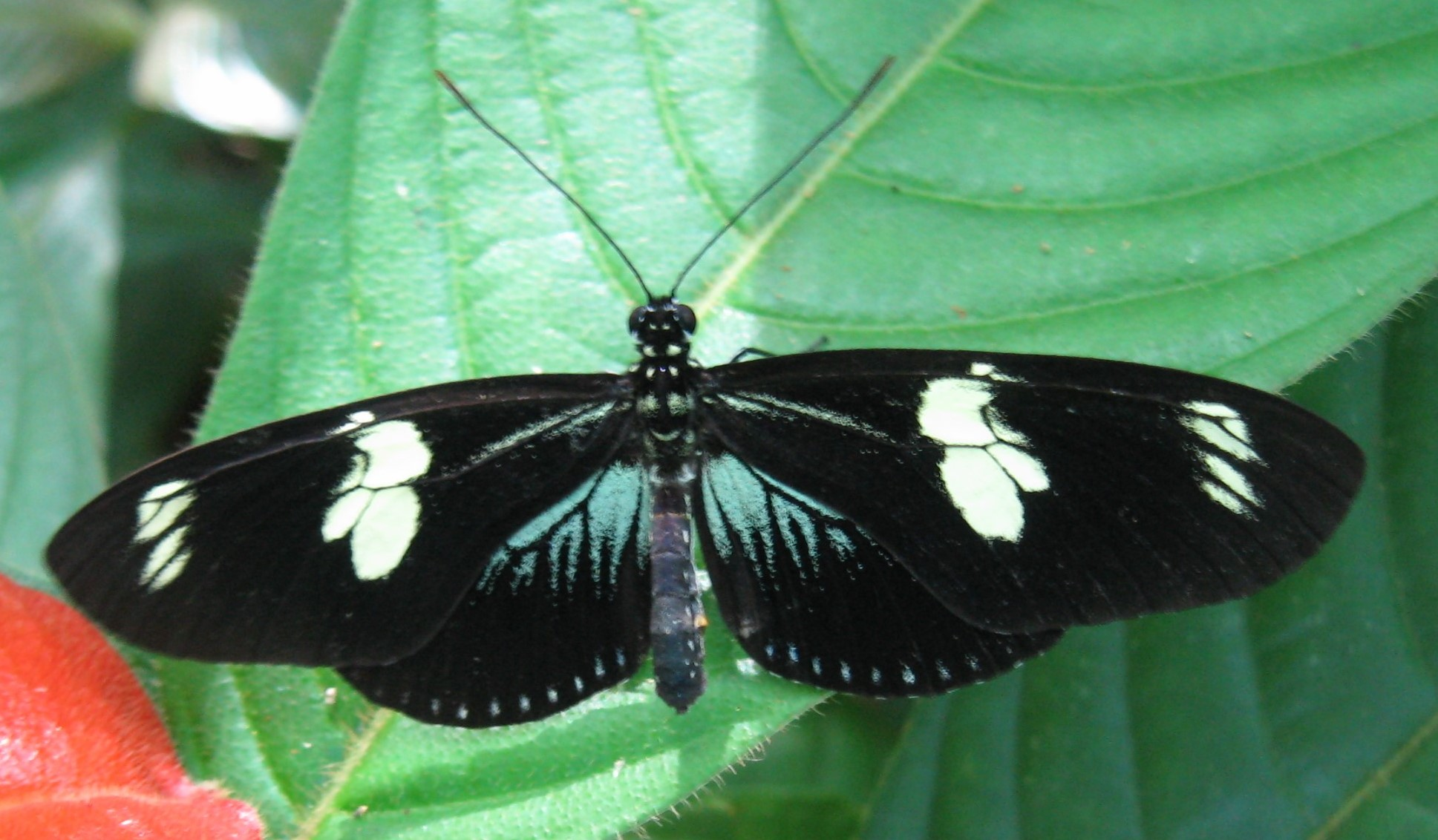
Heliconius doris morralli TRINIDAD

Heliconius doris, the Doris longwing or Doris is a species of butterfly in the family Nymphalidae. It is known for being a polymorphic species which participates in various Müllerian mimicry rings throughout Central America and the Amazon rainforest. It is a species of special interest in biological science for the genetic basis and role of polymorphism (biology) in ecology and evolution.

It is commonly found from sea level to 1200 metres in forest clearings.

The larvae primarily feed on granadilla species. Adults feed on nectar from Lantana flowers, with the females also collecting pollen from Psiguria and Psychotia flowers.

== Subspecies ==
Listed alphabetically:

- Heliconius doris delila (Hübner, [1813]) – (Peru)
- Heliconius doris dives (Oberthür, 1920) – (Colombia, Venezuela)
- Heliconius doris doris (Linnaeus, 1771) – (Surinam, French Guiana, Guyana, Colombia, Bolivia, Peru, Brazil)
- Heliconus doris morralli (Cast, 2019) – (Trinidad)
- Heliconius doris obscurus (Weymer, 1891) – (Colombia, Ecuador)
- ?Heliconius doris virescens Riffarth, 1901
- Heliconius doris viridis (Staudinger, 1885) – (Panama, Honduras)

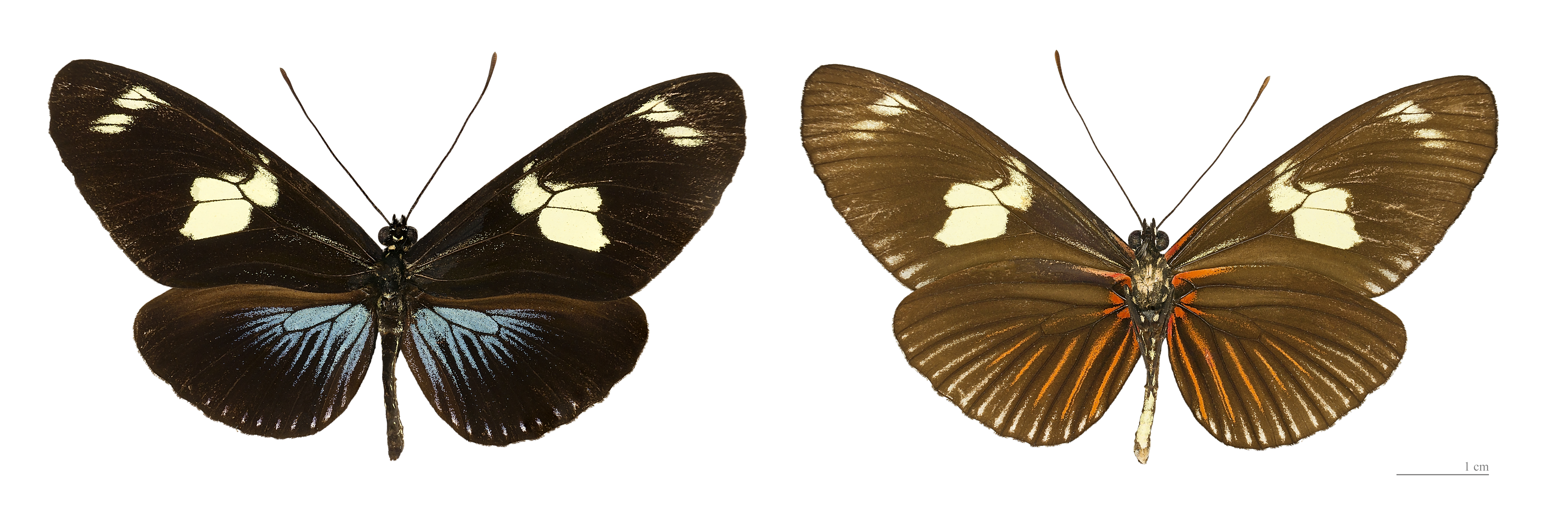
H. d. doris - MHNT

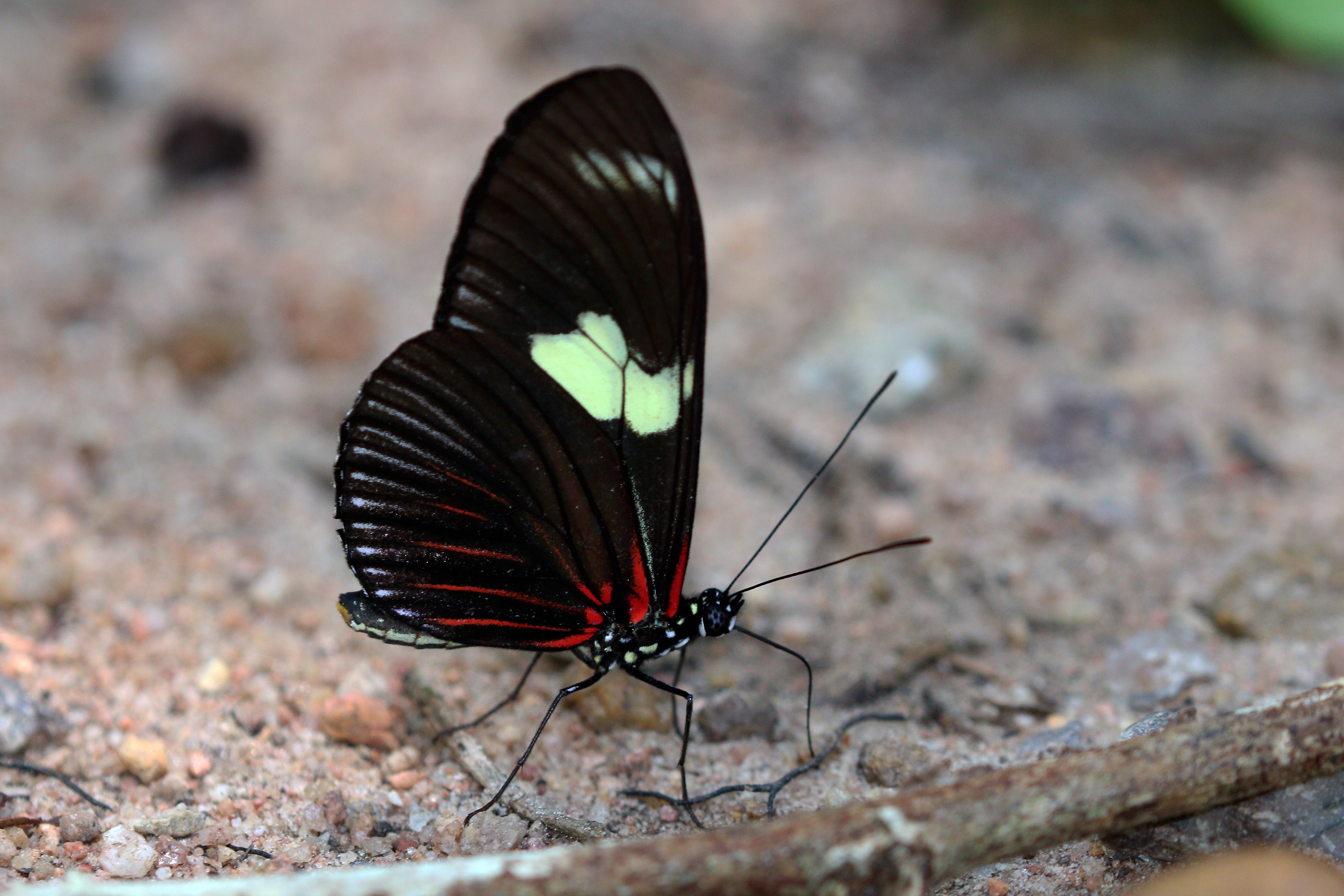
H. d. doris
Rayed longwing
Cristalino River
Southern Amazon, Brazil

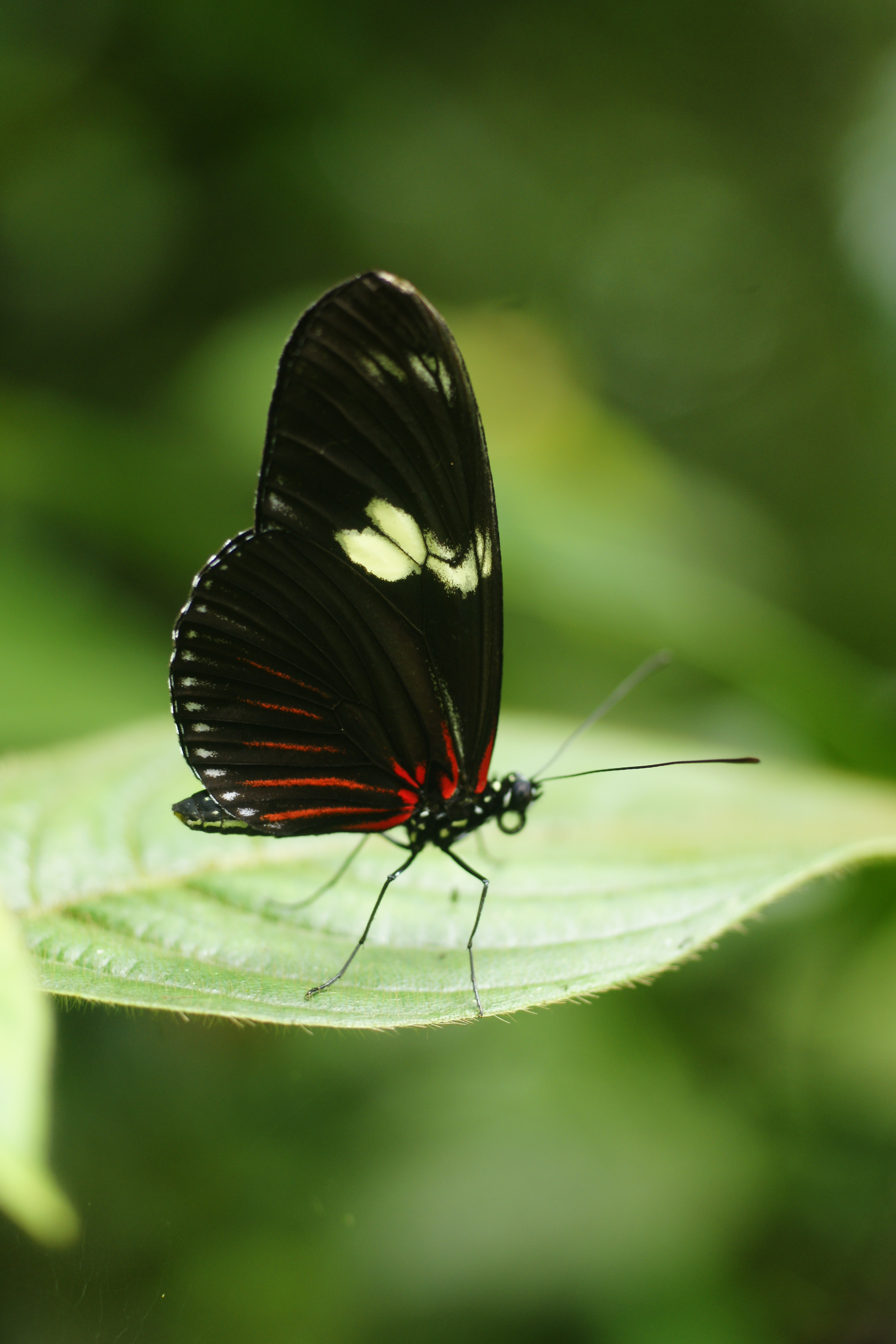
H. d. viridis
Las Horquetas
Costa Rica
