= Horticultural therapy =

Kind of therapy

Horticultural therapy (also known as garden therapy or social and therapeutic horticulture) involves using gardening activities to promote human healing and rehabilitation. It helps people become more calm and peaceful by using gardening in nature.

Horticulture, derived from the Latin words hortus (garden plant) and cultura (tilling the soil), is the art and science of growing fruits, vegetables, flowers, trees, shrubs, and ornamental plants. It involves the intensive cultivation of plants, often on a smaller scale compared to agronomy, and includes various specializations such as propagation, landscaping, and floriculture.

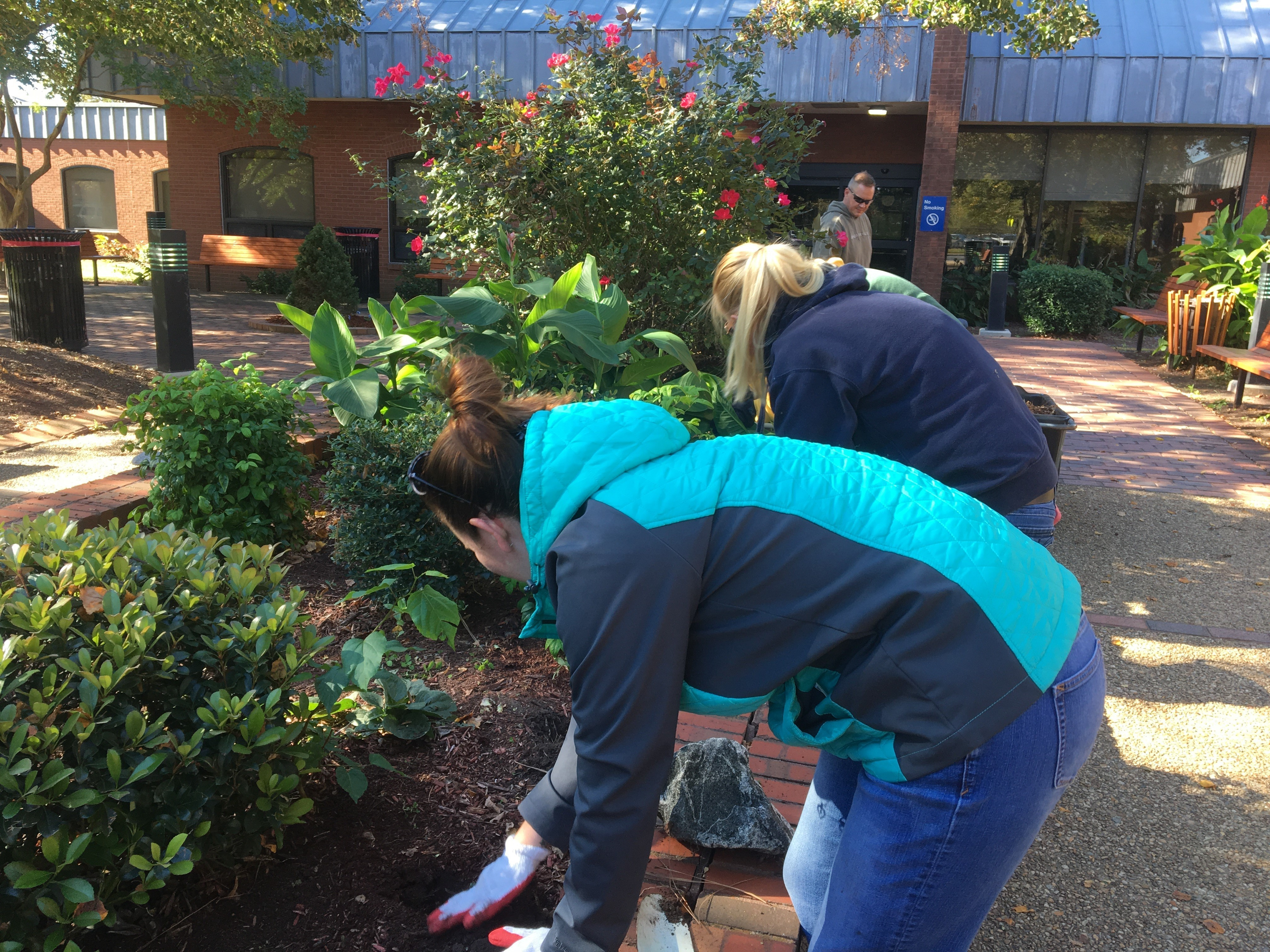
Veterans participating in Horticultural Therapy

== History ==
Horticultural therapy uses plants and gardening activities to support human healing and rehabilitation. The therapeutic value of horticulture has deep historical roots: as early as 2000 BC, Mesopotamian cultures incorporated gardens and plant materials into practices intended to soothe and restore well-being. By around 500 BC, Persian designers developed “paradise gardens” that engaged sight, scent, and sound to promote sensory comfort and reflection.

In the United States, interest in horticulture as a therapeutic medium expanded notably during the 19th century. Dr. Benjamin Rush, often regarded as the “Father of American Psychiatry”, observed the positive effects of gardening for individuals with mental illness. Later figures, including Alice Burlingame and Donald Watson, helped formalize the field with their collaborative text Therapy Through Horticulture (1960) became one of the first works to articulate horticultural therapy as a structured clinical practice.

A major turning point in the modern development of horticultural therapy occurred after World War II. The rapid growth of occupational therapy programs within U.S. Veterans Administration hospitals created new opportunities to incorporate horticulture into rehabilitation. Occupational therapy textbooks throughout the 1940s frequently included chapters on therapeutic plant use, and occupational therapists were among the first to distinguish horticultural therapy as a distinct treatment modality rather than simply an occupational therapeutic activity.

Institutional support for the profession grew in the 1970s. The first academic degree specifically in horticultural therapy was awarded in 1972. In 1973, practitioners formed the National Council for Therapy and Rehabilitation through Horticulture (NCTRH) to promote standards, training, and research. The organization initiated annual conferences that same year, established a professional registration process in 1975, and approved a core curriculum in 1985. It adopted the name American Horticultural Therapy Association (AHTA) in 1987, and the association’s journal, Journal of Therapeutic Horticulture, has been published since 1986.

== Types of treatment ==
Goals and types of treatment vary depending on the facility using horticultural therapy. Institutions like schools, nursing homes and prisons utilize horticultural therapy to meet therapeutic needs. Each one of these facilities have different types of horticultural therapy usages, each with their own individual forms of treatment. Fundamentally horticultural therapy can be divided into three types of programming: Vocational, therapeutic, and social.

=== Vocational Horticultural Therapy ===
Vocational Horticultural Therapy is intended to teach skill and enhance behaviors that can be used in a job or workplace. People undergoing vocational therapy can learn skills involving greenhouses, vegetable gardening, tree and shrub care, as well as learn about plant production, sales and services. Activities vocational therapy teaches consists of how to repot, water, and move plants within their space. Learning the basic knowledge of their plants root system and the care different plants need is taught at their own pace. Ultimately aimed at employment, vocational horticulture therapy teaches people how to grow and work with plants while also learning the benefits of supporting themselves mentally and financially.

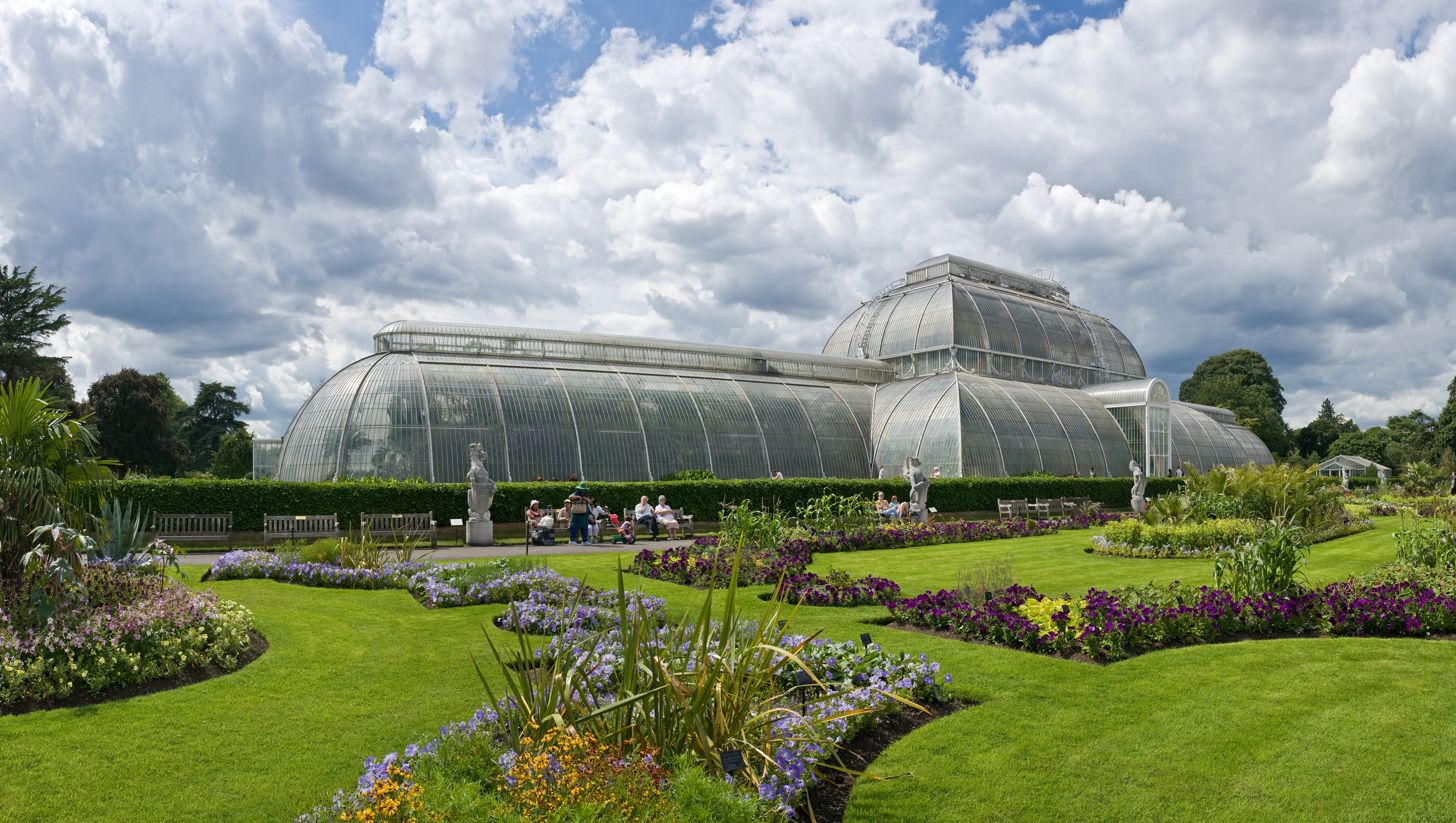
Gardening greenhouse

=== Therapeutic Horticultural Therapy ===
Therapeutic Horticultural Therapy has its focus on medical and illness recovery. As being in nature has benefits to the brain regarding cognitive abilities, attention span, and mental illnesses, therapeutic horticulture therapy affirms that being in nature has restorative properties. Therapeutic horticulture may be used to try and improve physical activity, social skills and engagement. Activities encompassed by therapeutic horticulture may vary.

A systematic review and meta-analysis of research comparing horticultural therapy with usual care and other non-pharmacological interventions for individuals with dementia found that participating in certain types of horticultural therapy activities appeared to improve cognitive functioning, agitation, positive emotion and engagement scores when compared to usual care and other non-pharmacological interventions.

=== Social Horticultural Therapy ===
Social Horticultural Therapy is focused on leisure activity and enhancement of life quality. Unlike Therapeutic Horticultural Therapy, Social Horticultural Therapy is more likely to be activity based.

== See also ==
- Alternative medicine
- Care farming
- Ecopsychology
- Occupational therapy
- Horticulture
- Movement/dance therapy
- Sensory garden
- Therapeutic garden
- Nature therapy
