= Alpha Beta Kappa =

American collegiate honor society

- ΑΒΚ
- Founded: 1977; 49 years ago
- Type: Honor
- Affiliation: Independent
- Status: Active
- Emphasis: Private Certificate, Vocational and Trade Schools
- Scope: National
- Motto: Faciemus "We shall build"
- Slogan: "The Mark of Distinction"
- Member badge
- Colors: Red and Blue
- Symbol: Star, Laurel wreath
- Flower: Red carnation
- Chapters: 500
- Headquarters: 31257 Bird Haven Street; Ocean View, Delaware 19970; United States
- Website: www.abkhs.org

Alpha Beta Kappa National Honor Society (ΑΒΚ) is an American honor society for students who attend private certificate, vocational, and trade schools. It was established in 1977 and has chartered 500 chapters. It was the first national society for private proprietary and nonprofit postsecondary institutions.

== History ==
Alpha Beta Kappa was established in 1977. Its primary objective is to promote and acknowledge outstanding academic achievement, character, and leadership among students at private certificate vocational and trade schools. It was the first national society for private proprietary and nonprofit postsecondary institutions. It aims to achieve this by establishing chapters within educational institutions that specialize in training men and women in various fields, trades, and occupations crucial to modern society.

It s national headquarters is located in Ocean View, Delaware.

== Symbols ==
Alpha Beta Kappa's colors are red and blue. Its symbols are the star and the laurel wreath. Its flower is the red carnation. The society's motto is Faciemus or "We shall build". Its tagline is "The Mark of Distinction".

The society's key is gold and features a five-point star, laurel branches, the Greek letters ΑΒΚ, and the words "Integrity" and "Excellence".

== Membership ==
Members must have a 3.85 grade point average and completed 30 credits, and have an attendance record of 98 percent or better.

== Chapters ==
Alpha Beta Kappa has chartered 500 chapters. Alpha Beta Kappa chapters are located at postsecondary institutes, colleges, schools, and universities, as well as distance learning institutions. Following is an incomplete list of chapters. Inactive institutions are in italics.

Chapter	Institution	Location	Status	References
	Alaska Career College	Anchorage, Alaska	Active	
	Arizona College of Allied Health	Glendale, Arizona	Active	
	Arizona College of Nursing	United States	Active	
	Arizona Culinary Institute	Scottsdale, Arizona	Active	
Gamma Kappa of Ohio	Athena Career Academy	Toledo, Ohio	Active	
	Aviation Institute of Maintenance	United States	Active	
	Beckfield College	Springdale, Ohio	Active	
	Bidwell Training Center	Pittsburgh, Pennsylvania	Active	
	Brookline Colleges	Phoenix, Arizona	Active	
	Bryant & Stratton College	United States	Active	
	California Aeronautical University	Bakersfield, California	Active	
	Carrington College	Western United States	Active	
	Chapman School of Seamanship	Stuart, Florida	Active	
	CollegeAmerica	Denver, Colorado	Active	
	Eastwick College	New Jersey	Active	
	Fayette Institute of Technology	Oak Hill, West Virginia	Active	
	Orion Technical College	Davenport, Iowa	Active	(Note: Chapter formed at Hamilton Technical College, now Orion Technical College.)
	Hawaii Medical College	Honolulu, Hawaii	Active	
	Herzing Universities	Wisconsin	Active	
	Hussian School of Art	Philadelphia, Pennsylvania	Active	
	IBMC College	Fort Collins, Colorado	Active	
	Irvine College of Law	Irvine, California	Inactive	(Note: The college closed on July 31, 2024.)
	JNA Institute of Culinary Arts	Philadelphia, Pennsylvania	Active	
	Johnson & Wales University	Providence, Rhode Island	Active	
	Johnson College	Scranton, Pennsylvania	Active	
	LIM College	New York City, New York	Active	
	Miller-Motte College	United States (online)	Active	
	New Castle School of Trades	New Castle, Pennsylvania and East Liverpool, Ohio	Active	
	Nossi College of Art & Design	Nashville, Tennessee	Active	
	Ohio Business College	Sheffield Village, Sandusky, and Middletown, Ohio	Active	
	Pittsburgh Institutes of Aeronautics	West Mifflin, Pennsylvania	Active	
	Prism Career Institute	Philadelphia, Pennsylvania; Cherry Hill, New Jersey; and Pleasantville, New Jersey	Active	
	Purdue University Global	United States (online)	Active	
	Remington College	United States (various)	Active	
	Saint Paul's School of Nursing	Staten Island, New York and Queens, New York	Active	
	SAE Expression College	Emeryville, California	Inactive	(Note: Chapter was chartered at Ex'pression College for Digital Arts, which later became SAE Expression College. The college closed in 2022.)
	San Joaquin Valley College	California	Active	
	School for Dog Trainers	Harmony, North Carolina	Active	
	Seattle Central College	Seattle, Washington	Active	
	Southeastern College	Miami Lakes and West Palm Beach, Florida	Active	
	Southwest University of Visual Arts	Tucson, Arizona	Inactive	(Note: The university closed on November 30, 2020.)
	Stautzenberger Colleges	Maumee, and Brecksville, Ohio	Active	
	Stevens–Henager College	Ogden, Utah	Inactive	(Note: College closed in August 2021.)
	Ultimate Medical Academy	Tampa and Clearwater, Florida	Active	
	University of Advancing Technology	Tempe, Arizona	Active	
	Universal Technical Institute	United States	Active	
	Washington Online Learning Institute	New City, New York	Inactive	(Note: Institution in closed.)
	Westcliff University	Irvine, California	Active	
	YTI Career Institute	Altoona, Lancaster, and York, Pennsylvania	Active	
