= Lambda Beta =

Honor society

- ΛΒ
- Founded: October 1986; 39 years ago
- Type: Honor
- Affiliation: Independent
- Status: Active
- Emphasis: Respiratory Care
- Scope: National
- Motto: "Life and Breath"
- Colors: Blue and Green
- Publication: Lambda Beta Newsletter
- Chapters: 150+
- Headquarters: 10801 Mastin Street, Suite 300; Overland Park, Kansas 66210; United States
- Website: Lambda Beta Society

Lambda Beta Society (ΛΒ) is an American honor society that recognizes undergraduate achievement in respiratory care related colleges. It was formed in 1986 and has chartered more than 150 chapters in the United States.

== History ==
Lambda Beta Society was formed in October 1986. It is a national honor society that recognizes undergraduate achievement in respiratory care related colleges.

By January 1988, the society had chartered 27 chapters. It is sponsored by the American Association for Respiratory Care, the American Respiratory Care Foundation, the Committee on Accreditation for Respiratory, and National Board for Respiratory Care (NBRC). It is governed by an eleven-member board of directors.

Lambda Beta was registered as a nonprofit corporation in January 2010. It has chartered over 150 chapters in the United States. Its national headquarters is at 10801 Mastin Street in Overland Park, Kansas.

== Symbols ==
The name Lamba Beta was chosen to represent the goals of sustaining “Life" and "Breath”. The society's motto is "Life and Breath". The society's colors are blue and green. Its insignia is a key with the Greek letters ΛΒ.

Its publication is Lambda Beta Newsletter.

== Activities ==
Lambda Beta awards four annual scholarships to students of institutions where it has chapters. The H. Frederick Helmholz, MD Scholarship recognizes an original narrative review of literature related to respiratory care. The NBRC Leadership Award is presented for academic leadership and community service. The CoARC Stephen P. Mikles, EdD, RRT, FAARC Media Award recognizes a presentation on respiratory care. The Brad Leidich Memorial Scholarship is for a first-generation student who is seeking an associate degree in respiratory therapy.

== Membership ==
Membership is open to undergraduate students studying respiratory care who are in the top 25 percent of their class, after completing half of their coursework. Members are nominated by existing members or by faculty. Membership categories include students, faculty, and national honorary members.

== Chapters ==
Following are the chapters of Lambda Beta, with inactive institutions in italics.

| Institution | Charter date | Location | Status | Ref. |
|---|---|---|---|---|
| Adventist University of the Antilles | | Mayagüez, Puerto Rico | Active | |
| Albany State University | | Albany, Georgia | Active | |
| Alvin Community College | | Alvin, Texas | Active | |
| Amarillo College | | Amarillo, Texas | Active | |
| American Career College, Anaheim | | Anaheim, California | Active | |
| American Career College, Ontario | | Ontario, California | Active | |
| American River College | | Sacramento, California | Active | |
| Andrew College | | Cuthbert, Georgia | Active | |
| Augusta University | | Augusta, Georgia | Active | |
| Big Sandy Community and Technical College, Mayo | | Paintsville Kentucky | Active | |
| Boise State University | | Boise, Idaho | Active | |
| Black Hawk College | January 1988 | Moline, Illinois | Inactive | |
| Brookdale Community College | | Lincroft, New Jersey | Active | |
| Byrdine F. Lewis College of Nursing and Health Professions | | Atlanta, Georgia | Active | |
| Cabarrus College of Health Sciences | | Concord, North Carolina | Active | |
| Carlow University | | Pittsburgh, Pennsylvania | Active | |
| Carrington College, Las Vegas | | Las Vegas, Nevada | Active | |
| Carrington College, Phoenix East | | Phoenix, Arizona | Active | |
| Central New Mexico Community College | | Albuquerque, New Mexico | Active | |
| Cincinnati Respiratory Consortium | | Batavia, Ohio | Active | |
| Coastal Alabama Community College, Minette | | Bay Minette, Alabama | Active | |
| Collin College | | McKinney, Texas | Active | |
| Collins Career Technical Center | | Chesapeake, Ohio | Active | |
| Columbia State Community College | | Columbia, Tennessee | Active | |
| Columbus State Community College | | Columbus, Ohio | Active | |
| Columbus Technical College | | Columbus, Georgia | Active | |
| Concorde Career College, Dallas | | Dallas, Texas | Active | |
| Concorde Career College, Garden Grove | | Garden Grove, California | Active | |
| Connecticut State Community College Norwalk | | Norwalk, Connecticut | Active | (Note: Chapter formed at Norwalk Community College, now Connecticut State Community College Norwalk.) |
| County College of Morris | | Randolph, New Jersey | Active | |
| Cuyahoga Community College | | Parma, Ohio | Active | |
| Del Mar College | | Corpus Christi, Texas | Active | |
| Des Moines Area Community College | | Ankeny, Iowa | Active | |
| East Tennessee State University | | Johnson City, Tennessee | Active | |
| Eastern Florida State College | | Melbourne, Florida | Active | |
| Florida National University | | Hialeah, Florida | Active | |
| Florida SouthWestern State College | | Fort Myers, Florida | Active | |
| Fort Hays Tech Northwest | | Goodland, Kansas | Active | (Note: Chapter formed at Northwest Kansas Technical College, now Fort Hays Tech Northwest.) |
| Frederick Community College | | Frederick, Maryland | Active | |
| GateWay Community College | | Phoenix, Arizona | Active | |
| Genesee Community College | | Batavia, New York | Active | |
| Georgia Northwestern Technical College, Floyd County Campus | | Rome, Georgia | Active | |
| Georgia Southern University, Savannah | | Savannah, Georgia | Active | |
| Georgia State University | | Atlanta, Georgia | Active | |
| Great Falls College Montana State University | | Great Falls, Montana | Active | |
| Gulf Coast State College | | Panama City, Florida | Active | |
| Gwynedd Mercy University | | Gwynedd Valley, Pennsylvania | Active | |
| Harrisburg Area Community College | | Harrisburg, Pennsylvania | Active | |
| Hinds Community College, Jackson | | Jackson, Mississippi | Active | |
| Idaho State University | | Pocatello, Idaho | Active | |
| Illinois Central College | | East Peoria, Illinois | Active | |
| Indiana University Health | | Indianapolis, Indiana | Active | |
| Indiana University of Pennsylvania, Northpointe Regional Campus | | Freeport, Pennsylvania | Active | |
| Ivy Tech Community College of Indiana, North Campus | | Fort Wayne, Indiana | Active | |
| Ivy Tech Community College of Indiana, Lafayette Campus | | Lafayette, Indiana | Active | |
| Jackson College | | Jackson, Michigan | Active | |
| Jacksonville State University | | Jacksonville, Alabama | Active | |
| Kankakee Community College | | Kankakee, Illinois | Active | |
| Kansas City Kansas Community College | | Kansas City, Kansas | Active | |
| Kent State University at Ashtabula | | Ashtabula, Ohio | Active | |
| Kettering College | | Dayton, Ohio | Active | |
| Kirkwood Community College | | Cedar Rapids, Iowa | Active | |
| L. E. Fletcher Technical Community College | | Schriever, Louisiana | Active | |
| Laramie County Community College | | Cheyenne, Wyoming | Active | |
| Laurel Business Institute | June 2011 | Uniontown, Pennsylvania | Active | |
| Laurel Technical Institute Sharon Satellite | | Sharon, Pennsylvania | Active | |
| Liberty University | | Lynchburg, Virginia | Active | |
| Loma Linda University | | Loma Linda, California | Active | |
| Lone Star College–Kingwood | | Kingwood, Houston, Texas | Active | |
| Los Angeles Valley College | | Valley Glen, Los Angeles, California | Active | |
| LSU Health Sciences Center New Orleans | | New Orleans, Louisiana | Active | |
| Luzerne County Community College | | Nanticoke, Pennsylvania | Active | |
| Mandl School, The College of Allied Health | | New York City, New York | Active | |
| Marshall University / St. Mary's Medical Center | | Huntington, West Virginia | Active | |
| Marywood University | | Scranton, Pennsylvania | Active | |
| Mayo Clinic College of Medicine and Science | | Rochester, Minnesota | Active | |
| Miami Dade College | | Miami, Florida | Active | |
| Middle Georgia State University | | Macon, Georgia | Active | |
| Midlands Technical College | | West Columbia, South Carolina | Active | |
| Midwestern State University | | Wichita Falls, Texas | Active | |
| Missouri Southern State University | | Joplin, Missouri | Active | |
| Molloy University | | Rockville Centre, New York | Active | |
| Monroe County Community College | | Monroe, Michigan | Active | |
| Mountwest Community & Technical College / St. Mary's Medical Center | | Huntington, West Virginia | Active | |
| Napa Valley College | | Napa, California | Active | |
| Nassau Community College | | East Garden City, New York | Active | |
| National Park College | | Hot Springs, Arkansas | Active | |
| Stanly Community College | | Locust, North Carolina | Active | |
| Nebraska Methodist College | | Omaha, Nebraska | Active | |
| Newman University | | Wichita, Kansas | Active | |
| North Dakota State University | | Fargo, North Dakota | Active | |
| North Louisiana | | Shreveport, Louisiana | Active | |
| North Shore Community College, Danvers | | Danvers, Massachusetts | Active | |
| Northeast Mississippi Community College | | Booneville, Mississippi | Active | |
| Northern Essex Community College, Lawrence | | Lawrence, Massachusetts | Active | |
| Northern Kentucky University | | Highland Heights, Kentucky | Active | |
| Nova Southeastern University, Palm Beach Gardens | | Palm Beach Gardens, Florida | Active | |
| Ohio State University | | Columbus, Ohio | Active | |
| Palm Beach State College, Palm Beach Gardens | 2009 | Palm Beach Gardens, Florida | Active | |
| Pearl River Community College, Lowery Woodall Advanced Technology Center | | Hattiesburg, Mississippi | Active | |
| Pennsylvania College of Health Science | | Lancaster, Pennsylvania | Active | |
| Piedmont Technical College, Lex Walters Campus | | Greenwood, South Carolina | Active | |
| Pierpont Community and Technical College | | Fairmont, West Virginia | Active | |
| Pima Medical Institute, Denver | | Denver, Colorado | Active | |
| Pima Medical Institute, Houston | | Houston, Texas | Active | |
| Pima Medical Institute, Las Vegas | | Las Vegas, Nevada | Active | |
| Pima Medical Institute, Mesa | | Mesa, Arizona | Active | |
| Pima Medical Institute, Renton | | Renton, Washington | Active | |
| Pima Medical Institute, San Marcos | | San Marcos, California | Active | |
| Pima Medical Institute, Tucson | | Tucson, Arizona | Active | |
| Prince George's Community College | | Largo, Maryland | Active | |
| Quinsigamond Community College | | Worcester, Massachusetts | Active | |
| Radford University | | Radford, Virginia | Active | |
| Rhodes State College | | Lima, Ohio | Active | |
| Rock Valley College | | Rockford, Illinois | Active | |
| Rowan University | | Stratford, New Jersey | Active | |
| Rush University | | Chicago, Illinois | Active | |
| Salisbury University | 1997 | Salisbury, Maryland | Active | |
| San Jacinto College, Pasadena | | Pasadena, Texas | Active | |
| San Joaquin Valley College, Bakersfield | | Bakersfield, California | Active | |
| San Joaquin Valley College, Ontario | | Ontario, California | Active | |
| San Joaquin Valley College, Rancho Cordova | | Rancho Cordova, California | Active | |
| San Joaquin Valley College, Temecula | | Temecula, California | Active | |
| San Joaquin Valley College, Visalia | | Visalia, California | Active | |
| San Juan College | | Farmington, New Mexico | Active | |
| Santa Fe Community College | | Santa Fe, New Mexico | Active | |
| Santa Monica College | | Santa Monica, California | Active | |
| Sinclair Community College | | Dayton, Ohio | Active | |
| Somerset Community College | | Somerset, Kentucky | Active | |
| South College | | Nashville, Tennessee | Active | |
| South Plains College, Lubbock | | Lubbock, Texas | Active | |
| South Texas College | | McAllen, Texas | Active | |
| Southeastern Community College | | West Burlington, Iowa | Active | |
| Southern Connecticut State University | | New Haven, Connecticut | Active | |
| Southern Maine Community College, Portland | | South Portland, Maine | Active | |
| Southern West Virginia Community and Technical College, Williamson | 1987 | Williamson, West Virginia | Active | |
| St. Catherine University | | Saint Paul, Minnesota | Active | |
| St. Louis Community College–Forest Park | | St. Louis, Missouri | Active | |
| St. Petersburg College, Pinellas | | Pinellas Park, Florida | Active | |
| St. Philip's College | | San Antonio, Texas | Active | |
| Stark State College | | North Canton, Ohio | Active | |
| Stony Brook University | | Stony Brook, New York | Active | |
| SUNY Erie, City Campus | | Buffalo, New York | Active | (Note: Chapter formed at Erie Community College, now called SUNY Erie.) |
| SUNY Sullivan | | Loch Sheldrake, New York | Active | |
| SUNY Upstate Medical University | | Syracuse, New York | Active | |
| Tarrant County College | | Fort Worth, Texas | Active | |
| Temple College | | Temple, Texas | Active | |
| Tennessee State University | | Nashville, Tennessee | Active | |
| Texas State University Round Rock Campus | | Round Rock, Texas | Active | |
| Thomas Jefferson University / National Jewish Health | | Philadelphia, Pennsylvania | Active | |
| Tidewater Community College, Virginia Beach | | Virginia Beach, Virginia | Active | |
| Tyler Junior College | | Tyler, Texas | Active | |
| Union County College, Plainfield | | Plainfield, New Jersey | Active | |
| University of Arkansas for Medical Science | | Little Rock, Arkansas | Active | |
| University of Akron | | Akron, Ohio | Active | |
| University of Hartford | | West Hartford, Connecticut | Active | |
| University of Kansas Medical Center | | Kansas City, Kansas | Active | |
| University of Mary / St. Alexius Medical Center | | Bismarck, North Dakota | Active | |
| University of Michigan–Flint | | Flint, Michigan | Active | |
| University of Missouri | | Columbia, Missouri | Active | |
| University of North Alabama | | Florence, Alabama | Active | |
| University of North Carolina at Charlotte | | Charlotte, North Carolina | Active | |
| University of North Carolina Wilmington | | Wilmington, North Carolina | Active | |
| University of Southern Indiana | | Evansville, Indiana | Active | |
| University of Texas Health Science Center at San Antonio | | San Antonio, Texas | Active | |
| University of Texas Medical Branch Galveston | | Galveston, Texas | Active | |
| University of the District of Columbia Community College | | Washington, D.C. | Active | |
| University of Toledo | | Toledo, Ohio | Active | |
| Utah Tech University | | St. George, Utah | Active | |
| Utah Valley University | | Orem, Utah | Active | |
| Valencia College | | Orlando, Florida | Active | |
| Vermont Technical College | | Williston, Vermont | Inactive | (Note: VTC merged with Northern Vermont University and Castleton University to become Vermont State University in 2023.) |
| Victor Valley College | | Victorville, California | Inactive | |
| Victoria College | | Victoria, Texas | Active | |
| Wallace Community College | | Dothan, Alabama | Active | |
| Wallace State Community College | | Hanceville, Alabama | Active | |
| Walters State Community College, Niswonger | | Greeneville, Tennessee | Active | |
| Washington Adventist University | | Takoma Park, Maryland | Active | |
| Washington State College of Ohio | 2022 | Marietta, Ohio | Active | |
| Weber State University, Davis | | Ogden Utah | Active | |
| West Chester University / Bryn Mawr Hospital | | Bryn Mawr, Pennsylvania | Active | |
| West Virginia University | | Morgantown, West Virginia | Active | |
| Westchester Community College | | Valhalla, New York | Active | |
| Youngstown State University | | Youngstown, Ohio | Active | |

== See also ==
- Respiratory therapy
- Professional fraternities and sororities
