= Timeline of respiratory therapy =

== Ancient period ==
- 1550 BC: (EG) The Ebers Papyrus describes ancient Egyptian inhalation treatments for asthma.

== Eighteenth Century (1700s) ==
- 1771: (US) Carl Scheele (1742–1786) makes "fire air" (oxygen) by heating magnesium oxide. His findings are published in June 1774.
- 1774: (US) Joseph Priestley (1733–1804), credited with the discovery of oxygen, publishes his work on "dephlogisticated air" oxygen 3 months after a report by Carl Scheele.

== Nineteenth Century (1800s) ==
- 1816: (US) Rene T.H. Laennec (1776–1856) invents the stethoscope for chest auscultation and lays the foundation for modern pulmonology with his book Diseases of the Chest.
- 1860: (US) Bunsen and Kirchhoff invent the spectrometer.
- 1860: (US) Stokes and Hoppe-Seyler demonstrate the oxygen transport function of hemoglobin.
- 1897: (DE) Gustav Killian performs the first bronchoscopy in Germany.
- 1899: (US) Dr. Thomas Willis defines specific Asthma symptoms for diagnosis.

== Twentieth Century (1900s) ==
=== 1900-1920 ===
- 1908: (US) George Poe demonstrated his mechanical respirator by asphyxiating dogs and seemingly bringing them back to life.
- 1918: Oxygen masks are used to treat combat-induced pulmonary edema.

=== 1920-1940 ===
- 1928: Phillip Drinker develops the "iron lung" negative pressure ventilator.
- 1935: Carl Matthes invented the first noninvasive oximeter employing an ear probe.

=== 1940-1960 ===
- 1943: Dr. Edwin R. Levine, MD began training technicians in basic inhalation therapy for post-surgical patients.
- 1946: (US) Dr Levine and his technicians formed the Inhalation Therapy Association.
- 1954: (US) March 16, 1954 the ITA is renamed the American Association of Inhalation Therapists (AAIT).
- 1966: (US) February 1966, the ITA was again renamed the American Association for Inhalation Therapy (still, AAIT).
- 1956: (US) The AAIT begins publishing a science journal, Inhalation Therapy (now RESPIRATORY CARE).
- 1960: (US)In October 1960 The American Registry of Inhalation Therapists (ARIT) is formed to oversee examinations for formal credentialing for people in the field.

=== 1960-1980 ===
- 1961: (US) Sister Mary Yvonne Jenn becomes the first Registered Respiratory Therapist
- 1961: Metaproterenol, the beta-2 bronchodilator is introduced.
- 1964: (CA) The Canadian Society of Respiratory Therapists (CSRT) is founded in 1964 as the Canadian Society of Inhalation Therapy Technicians.
- 1970: (US) In 1970 The Board of Schools of Inhalation Therapy Technicians became the Joint Review Committee for Respiratory Therapy Education (JRCRTE).
- 1971: (US) Continuous positive airway pressure (CPAP) is introduced by Gregory.
- 1971: (US) The journal Inhalation Therapy is renamed to Respiratory Care.
- 1974: (US) The two US credentialing programs merge into a single credentialing organization called the National Board for Respiratory Therapy (NBRT) in 1974.
- 1980: (US) President Jimmy Carter proclaimed the first Cystic Fibrosis Awareness Week. (July 22)

=== 1980-2000 ===
- 1982: (US) California passes the first modern licensure law governing the profession of respiratory care.
- 1982: (US) In 1982 President Ronald Reagan proclaimed the first National Respiratory Care Week.
- 1986: (US) In 1986 the NBRT is renamed the National Board for Respiratory Care (NBRC).
- 1998: (US) The JRCRTE evolves into the Committee on Accreditation for Respiratory Care (CoARC).

== Twenty-First Century (2000s) ==
- 2000: (US) Respiratory Care journal is accepted into Index Medicus and its online counterpart, the MEDLINE service.
- 2004: (US) Vermont becomes the 48th state to pass a Respiratory Care Act, effectively bringing legal credentialing to all 48 contiguous states in the United States.
- 2010: (US) On December 14, 2010, the National Commission for Certifying Agencies (NCCA) grants accreditation to the Sleep Disorders Specialty Examination. The CRT-SDS and RRT-SDS.
- 2011: (US) In July, 2011 the NBRC creates the Adult Critical Care Specialty for Registered Respiratory Therapists (RRT-ACCS).
- 2011: (US) In 2011 the State of Hawaii became the 49th state in the United States to create a Board of Respiratory Care and enacting a Respiratory Care Act.
- 2012: (US) In April, 2012 the Office of Regulation in the State of Michigan recommends the de-regulation of the respiratory therapy profession. The report, seemingly with its head in the sand as regards respiratory care, concluded de-regulation would "eliminate unnecessary oversight [and remove regulation providing] no value to the citizens of Michigan."
