= List of accredited respiratory therapist programs =

As of August 2022, there are 348 registered respiratory therapist (RRT) programs currently accredited by the COARC.

== United States ==
=== Alabama ===
- University of Alabama at Birmingham
- University of South Alabama - Mobile
- Wallace Community College - Dothan
- Wallace State College - Hanceville

=== Arizona ===
- Apollo College-Mesa
- GateWay Community College - Phoenix
- Kaplan College-Phoenix
- Pima Community College-Tucson
- Pima Medical Institute-Mesa
- Pima Medical Institute-Tucson

=== Arkansas ===
- Northwest Arkansas Community College - Bentonville
- Pulaski Technical College - North Little Rock
- Southeast Arkansas College - Pine Bluff
- University of Arkansas for Medical Sciences-Little Rock
- University of Arkansas for Medical Sciences-Texarkana

=== California ===
- American Career College - Anaheim
- American Career College - Ontario
- American River College - Sacramento
- Butte College - Oroville
- California College San Diego
- Carrington College California - Pleasant Hill
- Concorde Career College-Garden Grove
- Concorde Career College-North Hollywood
- Concorde Career College-San Bernardino
- Crafton Hills College - Yucaipa
- East Los Angeles College - Monterey Park
- El Camino College - Torrance
- Foothill College - Los Altos Hills
- Fresno City College - Fresno
- Grossmont College - El Cajon
- Kaplan College-Salida
- Loma Linda University - Loma Linda
- Los Angeles Valley College - Valley Glen
- Modesto Junior College - Modesto
- Mount San Antonio College - Walnut
- Napa Valley College - Napa
- Ohlone College - Fremont
- Orange Coast College - Costa Mesa
- Pima Medical Institute-Chula Vista
- San Joaquin Valley College-Rancho Cucamonga
- San Joaquin Valley College-Bakersfield
- San Joaquin Valley College-Rancho Cordova
- San Joaquin Valley College-Visalia
- Santa Monica College - Santa Monica
- Skyline College - San Bruno
- Victor Valley College - Victorville

=== Colorado ===
- Pickens Technical College - Aurora
- Pima Medical Institute-Denver
- Pueblo Community College - Pueblo

=== Connecticut ===
- Goodwin College - East Hartford
- Manchester Community College - Manchester
- Naugatuck Valley Community College - Waterbury
- Norwalk Hospital/Norwalk Community Technical College - Norwalk
- Quinnipiac University - Hamden
- University of Hartford - West Hartford

=== Delaware ===
- Delaware Technical & Community College - Jack F. Owens Campus - Georgetown
- Delaware Technical & Community College - Wilmington

=== District of Columbia ===
- University of the District of Columbia - Washington, D.C.

=== Florida ===
- ATI Health Education Centers - Miami
- Broward College - Coconut Creek
- Daytona State College - Daytona Beach
- Edison State College - Fort Myers
- Florida A&M University - Tallahassee
- Florida State College at Jacksonville - Jacksonville
- Gulf Coast Community College - Panama City
- Hillsborough Community College - Tampa
- Indian River State College - Fort Pierce
- Miami Dade College - Miami
- Palm Beach Community College - Palm Beach Gardens
- Santa Fe College - Gainesville
- Seminole State College of Florida - Altamonte Springs
- St. Petersburg College - Pinellas Park
- Tallahassee Community College - Tallahassee
- University of Central Florida - Orlando
- Valencia Community College - Orlando

=== Georgia ===
- Albany State University - Albany
- Augusta Technical College - Augusta
- Georgia Northwestern Technical College - Rome
- Georgia Southern University–Armstrong Campus - Savannah
- Georgia State University - Atlanta
- Gwinnett Technical College - Lawrenceville
- Heart of Georgia Technical College - Dublin
- Medical College of Georgia - Augusta
- Middle Georgia State University - Macon
- Okefenokee Technical College - Waycross
- Southern Crescent Technical College - Griffin
- Southwest Georgia Technical College - Thomasville

=== Hawaii ===
- Kapiʻolani Community College - Honolulu

=== Idaho ===
- Boise State University - Boise
- Idaho State University - Pocatello

=== Illinois ===
- College of DuPage - Glen Ellyn
- Illinois Central College - Peoria
- Kankakee Community College - Kankakee
- Kaskaskia College - Centralia
- Malcolm X College - Chicago
- Moraine Valley Community College - Palos Hills
- Olive-Harvey College - Chicago
- Parkland College - Champaign
- Rock Valley College - Rockford
- Southwestern Illinois College - Belleville
- St. John's Hospital - Springfield
- Triton College - River Grove

=== Indiana ===
- Clarian Health Partners - Indianapolis
- Indiana University Northwest - Gary
- Ivy Tech Community College, Central Indiana Region - Indianapolis
- Ivy Tech Community College - Fort Wayne
- Ivy Tech Community College - Lafayette
- Ivy Tech Community College-Northwest Region - Gary
- Ivy Tech Community College - Sellersburg
- Ivy Tech Community College - Terre Haute
- University of Southern Indiana - Evansville

=== Iowa ===
- Des Moines Area Community College - Ankeny
- Kirkwood Community College - Cedar Rapids
- Northeast Iowa Community College - Peosta
- Southeastern Community College - West Burlington
- St. Luke's College - Sioux City

=== Kansas ===
- Johnson County Community College - Overland Park
- Kansas City Kansas Community College - Kansas City
- Labette Community College - Parsons
- Newman University - Wichita
- Seward County Community College - Liberal
- University of Kansas Medical Center - Kansas City
- Washburn University - Topeka

=== Kentucky ===
- Bellarmine University - Louisville
- Big Sandy Community and Technical College - Paintsville
- Bluegrass Community and Technical College - Lexington
- Jefferson Community and Technical College - Louisville
- Madisonville Community College - Madisonville
- Maysville Community and Technical College - Morehead
- Northern Kentucky University - Highland Heights
- Somerset Community College - Somerset
- Southcentral Kentucky Community and Technical College - Bowling Green
- Southeast Kentucky Community and Technical College - Pineville
- West Kentucky Community and Technical College - Paducah

=== Louisiana ===
- Bossier Parish Community College - Shreveport
- Delgado Community College - New Orleans
- Louisiana State University Health Sciences Center - New Orleans
- Louisiana State University Health Sciences Center - Shreveport
- Nicholls State University - Houma
- Our Lady of Holy Cross/Alton Ochsner Medical Foundation - New Orleans
- Our Lady of the Lake - Baton Rouge
- Southern University at Shreveport - Shreveport

=== Maine ===
- Kennebec Valley Community College - Fairfield
- Southern Maine Community College - South Portland

=== Maryland ===
- Allegany College of Maryland - Cumberland
- Baltimore City Community College - Baltimore
- Community College of Baltimore County - Essex
- Frederick Community College - Frederick
- Prince George's Community College - Largo
- Salisbury University - Salisbury
- Washington Adventist University - Takoma Park

=== Massachusetts ===
- Berkshire Community College - Pittsfield
- Massasoit Community College - Brockton
- North Shore Community College - Danvers
- Northeastern University - Boston
- Northern Essex Community College - Lawrence
- Quinsigamond Community College - Worcester
- Springfield Technical Community College - Springfield

== Michigan ==
- Delta College - University Center
- Ferris State University - Big Rapids
- Henry Ford Community College - Dearborn
- Kalamazoo Valley Community College - Kalamazoo
- Macomb Community College - Clinton Township
- Monroe County Community College - Monroe
- Mott Community College - Flint
- Muskegon Community College - Muskegon
- Oakland Community College - Southfield

== Minnesota ==
- Lake Superior College - Duluth
- Mayo Clinic, Mayo School of Health Sciences - Rochester
- Northland Community & Technical College - East Grand Forks
- Saint Paul College - Saint Paul
- St. Catherine University - Minneapolis

== Mississippi ==
- Copiah-Lincoln Community College - Woodville
- Hinds Community College - Jackson
- Itawamba Community College - Fulton
- Meridian Community College - Meridian
- Mississippi Gulf Coast Community College - Gautier Closed
- Northeast Mississippi Community College - Booneville
- Northwest Mississippi Community College - Southaven
- Pearl River Community College - Hattiesburg

== Missouri ==
- Cape Girardeau Career and Technology Center - Cape Girardeau
- Concorde Career College - Kansas City
- Hannibal Career & Technology Center/Hannibal LaGrange College - Hannibal
- Missouri Southern State University - Joplin
- Missouri State University - West Plains
- Ozarks Technical Community College - Springfield
- Rolla Technical Center - Rolla
- Sanford-Brown College - Fenton
- St. Louis Community College - St. Louis
- University of Missouri - Columbia

== Montana ==
- Montana State University College of Technology - Great Falls
- University of Montana - Missoula

== Nebraska ==
- Alegent Health, Midland University, University of Nebraska at Kearney - Omaha
- Metropolitan Community College - Omaha
- Nebraska Methodist College - Omaha
- Southeast Community College - Lincoln

== Nevada ==
- College of Southern Nevada - Las Vegas
- Pima Medical Institute - Paradise

== New Hampshire ==
- River Valley Community College - Claremont

== New Jersey ==
- Bergen Community College - Paramus
- Brookdale Community College - Lincroft
- Northwest New Jersey Consortium Respiratory Care Education - Randolph
- University of Medicine and Dentistry of New Jersey-North - Newark
- University of Medicine and Dentistry of New Jersey-South - Stratford

== New Mexico ==
- Central New Mexico Community College - Albuquerque
- Doña Ana Community College - Las Cruces
- Eastern New Mexico University - Roswell
- Pima Medical Institute - Albuquerque

== New York ==
- CUNY Borough of Manhattan Community College - New York City
- Erie Community College - North Campus - Williamsville
- Genesee Community College - Batavia
- Hudson Valley Community College - Troy
- Long Island University - Brooklyn
- Mohawk Valley Community College - Utica
- Molloy University - Rockville Centre
- Nassau Community College - Garden City
- Onondaga Community College - Syracuse
- Stony Brook University - Stony Brook
- SUNY Upstate Medical University - Syracuse
- Westchester Community College - Valhalla

== North Carolina ==
- Carteret Community College - Morehead City
- Catawba Valley Community College - Hickory
- Central Piedmont Community College - Charlotte
- Durham Technical Community College - Durham
- Edgecombe Community College - Rocky Mount
- Fayetteville Technical Community College - Fayetteville
- Forsyth Technical Community College - Winston-Salem
- Pitt Community College - Greenville
- Robeson Community College - Lumberton
- Rockingham Community College - Wentworth
- Sandhills Community College - Pinehurst
- Southwestern Community College - Sylva
- Stanly Community College - Albemarle

== North Dakota ==
- North Dakota State University - Fargo
- St. Alexius Medical Center / University of Mary - Bismarck

== Ohio ==
- Bowling Green State University Firelands College - Huron
- Buckeye Hills Career Center - Racine
- Cincinnati State Technical and Community College/University of Cincinnati Clermont College - Batavia
- Collins Career Center - Chesapeake
- Columbus State Community College - Columbus
- Cuyahoga Community College - Parma
- Eastern Gateway Community College - Steubenville
- James A. Rhodes State College - Lima
- Kettering College of Medical Arts - Kettering
- Lakeland Community College - Kirtland
- North Central State College - Mansfield
- Ohio State University - Columbus
- Shawnee State University - Portsmouth
- Sinclair Community College - Dayton
- Southern State Community College - Washington Court House
- Stark State College of Technology - North Canton
- University of Akron - Akron
- University of Toledo - Toledo
- Washington State Community College - Marietta
- Youngstown State University - Youngstown

== Oklahoma ==
- Francis Tuttle Vocational Technical Center - Oklahoma City
- Northwest Oklahoma Respiratory Care Consortium - Enid
- Rose State College - Midwest City
- Tulsa Community College - Tulsa
- Platt College, Moore Ok

== Oregon ==
- Lane Community College - Eugene
- Mt. Hood Community College - Gresham
- Oregon Institute of Technology - Klamath Falls

== Pennsylvania ==
- CHI Institute - Philadelphia Mills - Philadelphia
- Commonwealth University-Mansfield - Sayre
- Community College of Allegheny County-Allegheny Campus - Pittsburgh
- Community College of Philadelphia - Philadelphia
- Crozer-Chester Medical Center (Keystone) - Chester
- Gannon University - Erie
- Gwynedd-Mercy College - Gwynedd Valley
- Harrisburg Area Community College - Harrisburg
- Indiana University of Pennsylvania - Pittsburgh
- Luzerne County Community College - Nanticoke
- Millersville University - Millersville
- Reading Area Community College - Reading
- Sanford-Brown Institute - Pittsburgh
- Thaddeus Stevens College of Technology - Lancaster
- University of Pittsburgh - Johnstown
- West Chester University - West Chester
- York College of Pennsylvania - York

== Rhode Island ==
- Community College of Rhode Island - Lincoln

== South Carolina ==
- Florence-Darlington Technical College - Florence
- Greenville Technical College - Greenville
- Midlands Technical College - Columbia
- Orangeburg-Calhoun Technical College - Orangeburg
- Piedmont Technical College - Greenwood
- Spartanburg Community College - Spartanburg
- Tri-County Technical College - Pendleton
- Trident Technical College - Charleston

== South Dakota ==
- Dakota State University - Madison

== Tennessee ==
- Baptist Memorial College of Health Science - Memphis
- Chattanooga State Community College - Chattanooga
- Columbia State Community College - Columbia
- Concorde Career College - Memphis
- East Tennessee State University - Elizabethton
- Jackson State Community College - Jackson
- Roane State Community College - Harriman
- Tennessee State University - Nashville
- Volunteer State Community College - Gallatin

== Texas ==
- Alvin Community College - Alvin
- Amarillo College - Amarillo
- Angelina College - Lufkin
- Collin College - McKinney
- Del Mar College - Corpus Christi
- El Centro College - Dallas
- El Paso Community College - El Paso
- Houston Community College System - Houston
- Howard College - San Angelo
- Lamar Institute of Technology-Beaumont
- Lone Star College - Kingwood
- McLennan Community College - Waco
- Midland College - Midland
- Midwestern State University - Wichita Falls
- San Jacinto College-Central - Pasadena
- South Plains College - Lubbock
- St. Philip's College - San Antonio
- Tarrant County College - Hurst
- Temple College - Temple
- Texas Southern University - Houston
- Texas State University - San Marcos
- Tyler Junior College - Tyler
- University of Texas Health Science Center at San Antonio
- University of Texas Medical Branch - Galveston
- University of Texas at Brownsville and Texas Southmost College - Brownsville
- USAF School of Health Care Sciences / 882 Training Group - Sheppard Air Force Base
- Victoria College - Victoria
- Weatherford College - Weatherford

== Utah ==
- Independence University-California College for Health Sciences - Salt Lake City
- Stevens-Henager College - Murray
- Weber State University - Ogden

== Vermont ==
- Vermont State University - Randolph

== Virginia ==
- Central Virginia Community College - Lynchburg
- J. Sargeant Reynolds Community College - Richmond
- Jefferson College of Health Sciences - Roanoke
- Mountain Empire Community College - Big Stone Gap
- Northern Virginia Community College - Springfield
- Shenandoah University - Winchester
- Southwest Virginia Community College - Richlands
- Tidewater Community College - Virginia Beach

== Washington ==
- Highline Community College - Des Moines
- Seattle Central Community College - Seattle
- Spokane Community College - Spokane
- Tacoma Community College - Tacoma

== West Virginia ==
- Carver Career Center - Charleston
- West Virginia Northern Community College - Wheeling
- Wheeling Jesuit University - Wheeling

== Wisconsin ==
- Chippewa Valley Technical College - Eau Claire
- Madison Area Technical College - Madison
- Mid-State Technical College - Marshfield
- Milwaukee Area Technical College - Milwaukee
- Moraine Park Technical College - Fond du Lac
- Northeast Wisconsin Technical College - Green Bay
- Western Technical College - La Crosse

== Wyoming ==
- none
