= Peter Barnes (respiratory scientist) =

British pulmonary scientist and clinician

Sir Peter Barnes
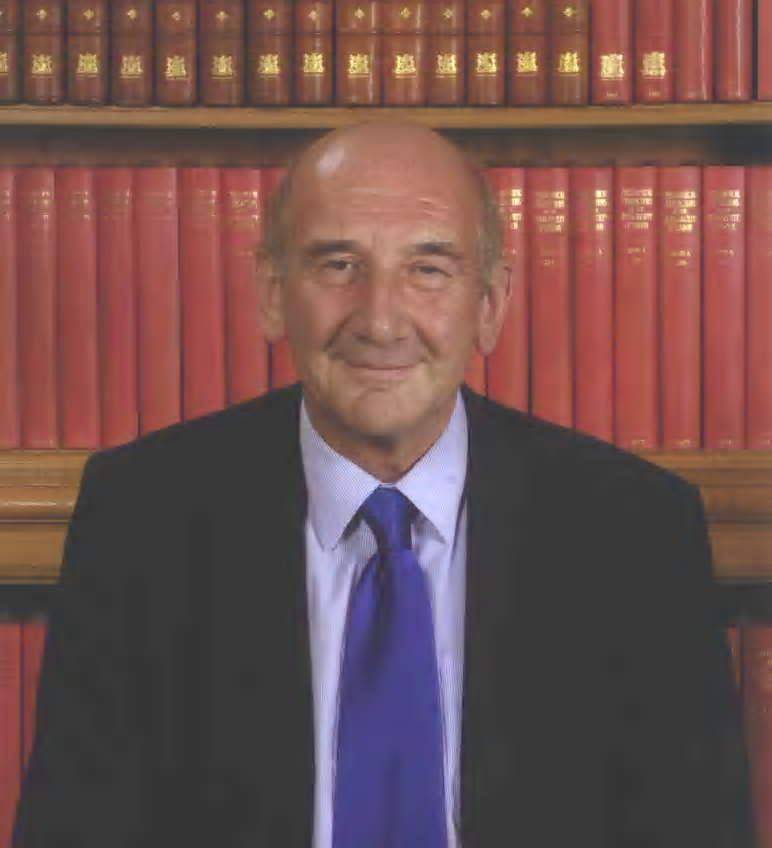
- Born: Peter John Barnes; 1946 (age 79–80); Birmingham, West Midlands
- Education: University of Cambridge; University of Oxford Medical School
- Known for: translational research in asthma and COPD
- Awards: Founding Fellow of the Academy of Medical Sciences 1998, Fellow of the Royal Society 2007, Member of the Academia Europaea 2012
- Scientific career
- Fields: Respiratory scientist and clinician
- Workplaces: National Heart & Lung Institute; Imperial College London; Royal Brompton Hospital, London
- Website: imperial.ac.uk/people/p.j.barnes

Sir Peter John Barnes, FRCP, FCCP, FMedSci, FRS (born 29 October 1946) is a British respiratory scientist and clinician, a specialist in the mechanisms and treatment of asthma and chronic obstructive pulmonary disease (COPD). He was Margaret Turner-Warwick Professor of Thoracic Medicine at the National Heart & Lung Institute, previous head of respiratory medicine at Imperial College and honorary consultant physician at the Royal Brompton Hospital London. He is one of the most highly cited scientists in the world.

== Early life ==
Barnes was born in Birmingham and went to school at Leamington College. He won an open scholarship to St Catharine's College, Cambridge, where he graduated with a Bachelor of Arts in natural sciences (first-class honours) in 1969. He moved to the Clinical School University of Oxford, where he was a scholar and graduated BM, BCh in 1972.

== Medical career ==
After qualifying in medicine, he undertook clinical training at the Radcliffe Infirmary Oxford, followed by posts in London at Brompton Hospital, Queen Square and UCH. In 1978 he moved to the Royal Postgraduate Medical School to undertake research in respiratory pharmacology and was awarded the degree of Doctor of Medicine(DM) from the University of Oxford. In 1981 he spent a year at the Cardiovascular Research Institute UCSF Medical Center. Returning to London, he worked as a senior registrar at Hammersmith Hospital and in 1982 was appointed consultant physician and clinical senior lecturer at RPMS. He then took up the newly created chair of clinical pharmacology at the NHLI in 1985, which was subsequently incorporated as a postgraduate institute into Imperial College and became an honorary consultant physician at Royal Brompton Hospital where he directed the National Heart and Lung Institute.

In 1987 he was appointed to the established chair of thoracic medicine at NHLI and was head of respiratory medicine at Imperial College until 2017.

Barnes was knighted in the 2023 Birthday Honours for services to respiratory science.

== Research ==
His research initially focussed on adrenergic regulation of the airways, the role of endogenous catecholamines (particularly epinephrine), adrenergic receptors and the role of cholinergic neural mechanisms in asthma. He was the first to map the distribution of receptors in the lung using radioligand autoradiography. His group investigated the role of neuropeptides in asthma and he proposed the axon reflex mechanism of asthma Their investigation into the role of inflammatory mechanisms in asthma and the role of inflammatory mediators, lead to an understanding of how transcription factors, such as NF-κB, regulate the expression of multiple inflammatory genes in the airways and how glucocorticosteroids suppress inflammation by switching off these transcriptional mechanisms. His research explored mechanisms of severe asthma and in particular steroid-resistance in asthma, identifying several molecular mechanisms. He also investigated how β_{2}-agonists and corticosteroids interact as these are the most commonly used drug therapies for asthma. His research group has also investigated inflammatory mechanisms in COPD, using the same approaches that had been used in asthma. An important achievement was to elucidate the molecular mechanism for the anti-inflammatory effects of glucocorticosteroids in asthma through the recruitment of histone deacetylase 2(HDAC2) to activated inflammatory genes, thereby reversing the histone acetylation that is involved in inflammatory gene activation. His research also investigated why glucocorticosteroids are ineffective in suppressing inflammation in COPD, demonstrating that this is due to decreased activity and expression of HDAC2 as a result of oxidative stress through tyrosine nitration and phosphorylation via PI3K-δ. He also showed that theophylline was able to restore HDAC2 and reverse steroid resistance in COPD by selectively inhibiting oxidant-activated PI3Kδ. He also pioneered the use of non-invasive markers to monitor inflammation in the airways and particularly exhaled nitric oxide, which is increased in asthma and reduced by steroid therapy. His research has had a major impact on current understanding of asthma and COPD mechanisms and how current therapies for these diseases work. This has identified several novel targets for therapy.

As a result of his research on steroid-resistance he co-founded (together with Garth Rapeport and Kazuhiro Ito) a spin-out company within Imperial College called RespiVert in 2007, which has discovered novel inhaled therapies that are now in clinical development for treatment of severe asthma and COPD since the company was acquired by Johnson & Johnson in 2010.

== Publications ==
Barnes is the author of over 1,500 publications in peer-reviewed journals and is one of the most highly cited scientists in the world. He has edited or co-edited over 50 books on asthma, COPD and respiratory pharmacology. His Web of Science h-index is over 200 with over 150,000 citations.

== Family life ==
He married Olivia Harvard-Watts, a psychotherapist, in 1976 and they have three sons: Adam (born 1978), Toby (born 1983) and Julian (born 1988).

== Honours and awards ==
- 1991 Linacre Lecture: Royal College of Physicians
- 1995 Dutch Medical Federation Annual Prize
- 1996 Amberson Lecture: American Thoracic Society
- 1997 MD Honoris Causa: University of Ferrara
- 1997 William Withering Lecture: Royal College of Physicians
- 1998 Founding Fellow: Academy of Medical Sciences
- 1998 Erasmus Lecture: Vrije Universiteit Brussel (University of Brussels)
- 1999 Sadoul Lecture: European Respiratory Society
- 2000 Manuel Albertal Memorial Lecture: American College of Chest Physicians
- 2001 MD Honoris Causa: University of Athens
- 2001 Poulson Prize: Norwegian Pharmacology Society
- 2002 College Medalist: American College of Chest Physicians
- 2008 MD Honoris Causa: University of Tampere
- 2007 Fellow of Royal Society (first respiratory researcher elected since Heny Hyde Salter in 1856)
- 2007 Gold Medal: British Thoracic Society
- 2009 Croonian Lecture: Royal College of Physicians
- 2009 Senior Investigator: National Institute for Health and Care Research (NIHR)
- 2010 MD Honoris Causa: Catholic University of Leuven
- 2011 Honorary Fellow St Catharine's College, Cambridge
- 2012 Master FCCP: American College of Chest Physicians
- 2012 Member Academia Europaea (European Academy)
- 2013 President: European Respiratory Society
- 2014 Doctorate Honoris Causa: University of Maastricht
- 2019-2023 President: British Association for Lung Research (BALR)
- 2020 Trudeau Medal : American Thoracic Society
- 2020 Honorary Fellowship, British Pharmacology Society
- 2022 The Imperial College Medal

== External sources ==
- Curriculum Vitae
- Publications
- Citations
- COPD interview
- ScienceWatch interview on COPD research
