= American Respiratory Care Foundation =

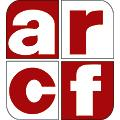
- Company type: non-profit organization
- Industry: Health care
- Founded: 1974
- Founder: American Association for Respiratory Care
- Headquarters: Irving, TX, United States
- Area served: United States
- Revenue: $749,783
- Total assets: $2,131,930
- Website: www.arcfoundation.org
- Footnotes / references EIN: 237089524

The American Respiratory Care Foundation is a non-profit organization founded by the American Association for Respiratory Care formed to provide funding for research in the field of pulmonology and respiratory care. Formed in 1974 as the American Respiratory Therapy Foundation and then changed to the American Respiratory Care Foundation in 1986. The ARCF is a partner with the United States Environmental Protection Agency, who has awarded grants to the ARCF in order to help fund research directly related to asthma and asthma education.

== Primary funding ==
- Undergraduate Student Awards — The ARCF previously supported individuals who were progressing toward an Associate of Science in Respiratory Therapy but ceased that support in 2011 changing the requirement to a student progressing toward a Bachelor of Science in Respiratory Therapy by either direct route or a bridge programme.

Scholarships and education grants
- Morton B. Duggan, Jr. Memorial Education Recognition Award
- Jimmy A. Young Memorial Education Recognition Award
- NBRC/AMP William W. Burgin, Jr. MD Education Recognition Award
- NBRC/AMP Robert M. Lawrence, MD Education Recognition Award

- Postgraduate Student Awards
- Research Fellowships / Abstract Awards
- Achievement Awards
- Literary Awards
- Research Grants — Research in respiratory care, pulmonology, sleep medicine and critical care medicine is one of the ARCF's primary missions.
- International Fellowships
- Community Grants

== International fellowship ==
The International Fellowship Program was established in 1990 as a method of expanding respiratory care practices internationally by inviting physicians and nurses among other health professionals to shadow respiratory therapists to observe the practice and application in medicine.

== See also ==
- Lambda Beta Society
- National Board for Respiratory Care
