= City College (Florida) =

Private coeducational four-year college in Fort Lauderdale, Florida

Coordinates: 26°11′15″N 80°10′12″W

- Former names: Draughon's College of Business, Career City College
- Type: Private college
- Active: 1984–2024
- Accreditation: ABHES
- Location: Fort Lauderdale, Florida, United States
- Campus: Altamonte Springs & Hollywood

City College was a private college based in Fort Lauderdale, Florida, United States. It was founded in 1984 as a branch of Draughons Junior College before becoming separate in 1989. In addition to its main campus, City College has had additional locations in Gainesville, Hollywood, Miami, and Orlando. The college offered ten associate degree programs and three bachelor's degree programs and was accredited by the Accrediting Bureau of Health Education Schools. On July 15, 2024, the college announced that it would be ceasing new enrollment and teaching out its degree programs. At the time of its announced closure, it had campuses in Hollywood and Altamonte Springs.

== History ==
City College was first established in 1984 as a branch of Draughons Junior College. In May 1988, the school added its first branch campus in Gainesville. In Fall of 1989, the school became an independent college and received approval to begin offering its first Associate of Science degrees; it expanded into Bachelor of Science degrees in July 1999.

The second branch of the school, in Miami, began operations in June 1997. In the same year, the Institute of Specialized Training and Management, Inc was approved to offer associate degrees and renamed itself to City College, becoming an Orlando affiliate of the main City College school.

The third branch of the school, in Hollywood, Florida, began operations in August 2011. The campus offered associate degree programs in emergency medical services, allied health and business.

On July 15, 2024, the college announced to students that it would be ceasing new enrollment and teaching out its degree programs. However, a reporter with Miami television station WPLG who visited the Hollywood campus on July 17, 2024, saw no evidence of teaching at the campus. An employee at the campus called a local police department in response to the reporter's inquiries into the closure. The reporter also noted that the institution has continued to post on its social media accounts.

== Academics ==
City College offered ten Associate of Science degrees in seven major programs, and Bachelor of Science degrees in their Business Administration program. In order to graduate with an associate degree, students must have completed 22-28 courses, including 6 general education courses 14 courses in their major area. For bachelor's degrees, students must have completed 45-46 courses, including 14 general education courses and 14-22 major courses. Students must have also maintained a 2.0 overall GPA, with some major areas having minimum grade requirements for major courses.

== Campuses ==
Originally located on Cypress Creek Road, the main campus of City College was moved to its final location in 2005, after the school purchased the Atrium 2000 office building in 2004 for $11.2 million. Housed on 9 acres (36,000 m^{2}) of land, the two-story building spans 50,000 square feet (4,600 m^{2}). The Gainesville campus was housed in a 21,200-square-foot (1,970 m^{2}) single-story building near downtown Gainesville with a separate 10,000 sq. ft. classroom location for the veterinary technology lab facilities. The Miami branch was housed in approximately 24,000 square feet (2,200 m^{2}) of two buildings in Dadeland Towers office park. The Hollywood campus occupies approximately 16,500 sq. ft. on the second and third floors of 6565 Taft St. Hollywood FL.

All four campuses had special working laboratories to allow students to get hands on experience in their respective fields of study. The school did not offer on-campus housing at any of its locations.

=== Orlando affiliate ===
City College Orlando was an affiliate campus of City College. It was originally established in December 1988 as the Institute of Specialized Training & Management, Inc. (ISTM), a school specializing in the education and career development of independent private investigators. In 1989, the school was officially licensed by the State Board of Independent Postsecondary Vocational, Technical, Trade and Business Schools. It began offering vocational programs in 1991, expanding to include associate degrees in 1996. In 1997, the school renamed itself and became an affiliate of City College. The campus obtained accreditation for the Associate of Science degrees it offered in 2000.

As an affiliate, the school had a separate director and board of directors from the other City College campuses, but otherwise has a similar structure and course offerings, the same mission, and similar education guidelines.

== Student life ==
City College did not offer organized student activities and had no sports teams, feeling that their students were attending the school "to learn job skills and many are involved with their own families and organizations". Students were allowed to form their own organizations, with faculty sponsorship and approval of the director. The school had four student organizations: Allied Health Student Association, the Broadcast Student Association (only for students at the Fort Lauderdale campus), the City College Ambassadors, and the Private Investigator Student Association.

== Accreditation ==
In 2017, all City College campuses were awarded initial, institutional accreditation by the Accrediting Bureau of Health Education Schools (ABHES). City College was formerly accredited by the Accrediting Council for Independent Colleges and Schools (ACICS) to award certificates, diplomas, and associate degrees.
