= List of Alpha Chi Rho chapters =

Alpha Chi Rho is a collegiate social fraternity. It has both undergraduate (collegiate) and alumni graduate chapters.

== Undergraduate chapters ==
In the following list, active chapters are indicated in bold and inactive chapters are in italics.

| Chapter | Charter date and range | Institution | Location | Status | Ref. |
|---|---|---|---|---|---|
| **Phi Psi** | 1895–1995, 2002 | Trinity College | Hartford, CT | Active | (Note: Reformed in 2002 from the Ravens Club, established in 2001.) |
| Phi Chi | 1896–1950 | Brooklyn Polytechnic Institute | Brooklyn, NY | Inactive | |
| **Phi Phi** | 1896 | University of Pennsylvania | Philadelphia, PA | Active | |
| Phi Upsilon | 1899–1902 | University of Iowa | Iowa City, IA | Inactive | |
| Phi Omega | 1900–1926, 1940–1971 | Columbia University | New York City, NY | Inactive | (Note: Reformed as a colony in 1939.) |
| Phi Alpha | 1903–1986 | Lafayette College | Easton, PA | Inactive | (Note: Originally Psi Alpha Kappa, established in 1900.) |
| Phi Beta | 1905–1989 | Dickinson College | Carlisle, PA | Inactive | |
| Phi Gamma | 1911–1960 | Wesleyan University | Middletown, CT | Inactive | (Note: Formed from Alpha Chi Alpha which was established in 1910.) |
| Phi Delta | 1905–1937 | Yale University | New Haven, CT | Inactive | |
| Phi Epsilon | 1905–1994, 2000–2022 | Syracuse University | Syracuse, NY | Inactive | (Note: Originally Phi Kapp Epsilon, established in 1905. Reformed as a colony in 1998.) |
| Phi Zeta | 1907–1931 | University of Virginia | Charlottesville, VA | Inactive | |
| Phi Eta | 1907–1934 | Washington and Lee University | Lexington, VA | Inactive | |
| Phi Theta | 1908–1971, 1976–1980, 1992–199x ? | Cornell University | Ithaca, NY | Inactive | (Note: Started as a colony in 1974.) (Note: Reformed as a colony in 1975 and 1991.) |
| Phi Iota | 1914–1987 | Allegheny College | Meadville, PA | Inactive | (Note: Formed from Theta Delta Psi which was established in 1904.) |
| Phi Kappa | 1916–1999, 2003–2016 | University of Illinois at Urbana–Champaign | Urbana and Champaign, IL | Inactive | (Note: Formed from Chi Delta which was established in 1914. Reformed in 2001 as a colony.) |
| **Phi Lambda** | 1917–1996, 2005–2018, 2023 | Pennsylvania State University | University Park, PA | Active | (Note: Formed from the Pioneer Club which was established in 1912. Reformed from a colony in 2001.) |
| Phi Mu | 1918–1989, 1993–2007 | Lehigh University | Bethlehem, PA | Inactive | (Note: Formed from Theta Delta Psi which was established in 1915. Reformed as a colony in 1992.) |
| Phi Nu | 1919–1935, 1957–1962 | Dartmouth College | Hanover, NH | Inactive | (Note: Formed from Epsilon Kappa Alpha which was established in 1919. Reformed as a colony in 1956.) |
| Phi Xi | 1921–1933 | University of Michigan | Ann Arbor, MI | Inactive | (Note: Formed from Alpha Beta Phi which was established in 1915.) |
| Phi Omicron | 1922–1970, 1977–1990 | University of Wisconsin–Madison | Madison, WI | Inactive | (Note: Formed from Beta Chi Sigma which was established in 1921. Reformed as a colony in 1971.) |
| Phi Pi | 1923–1937, 1979–1982 | Ohio State University | Columbus, OH | Inactive | (Note: Formed from Theta Delta Psi which was established in 1922. Reformed as a colony in 1974.) |
| Phi Rho | 1923–1931, 1951–1969 | University of California | Berkeley, CA | Inactive | (Note: Formed from the Dohlonega Club which was established in 1904. Reformed in 1951 from the Bacheldorn which was established in 1894.) |
| Phi Sigma | 1927–1943, 1956–1965 | Oregon State University | Corvallis, OR | Inactive | (Note: Formed from Gamma Nu which was established in 1917. Reformed as a colony in 1955.) |
| Phi Tau | 1932–1973 | Iowa State University | Ames, IA | Inactive | (Note: Formed from Arrow/Ausonia which was established in 1911.) |
| **Alpha Phi** | 1936 | Purdue University | West Lafayette, IN | Active | (Note: Formed from Delta Alpha Pi which was established in 1924.) |
| Beta Phi | 1937–1942, 1948–199x ?, 2006–2015 | Rutgers University | New Brunswick, NJ | Inactive | (Note: Formed from Alpha Sigma Rho which was established in 1925. Absorbed the Ivy Club and the Tritelion Club before 1942. Reformed in 1948 from the Colonial Club which was established in 1946. Reformed as a colony in 2003.) |
| Gamma Phi | 1937–1942 | Johns Hopkins University | Baltimore, MD | Inactive | (Note: Formed from Omicron Kappa Omicron which was established in 1921.) |
| **Delta Phi** | 1948 | Rensselaer Polytechnic Institute | Troy, NY | Active | (Note: Formed from Phi Delta Rho which was established in 1947.) |
| Epsilon Phi | 1955–1992, 2008–2015 | Temple University | Philadelphia, PA | Inactive | (Note: Formed from Sigma Chi Alpha which was established in 1953. Reformed from a colony in 2005.) |
| **Zeta Phi** | 1956 | Clarkson University | Potsdam, NY | Active | (Note: Formed from Omega Epsilon which was established in 1953.) |
| **Eta Phi** | 1958–1989, 1992 | Gettysburg College | Gettysburg, PA | Active | (Note: Formed from Phi Epsilon Nu which was established in 1954. Reformed as a colony in 1991.) |
| Theta Phi | 1959–1980, 1990–200x ? | Thiel College | Greenville, PA | Inactive | (Note: Formed from The Collegians which was established in 1957. Reformed as a colony in 1989.) |
| Iota Phi | 1959–1973 | Parsons College | Fairfield, IA | Inactive | (Note: Formed from the Phi Colony which was established in 1958.) |
| Kappa Phi | 1961–1972, 1991–200x ? | Slippery Rock University | Slippery Rock, PA | Inactive | (Note: Formed from The Collegians which was established in 1961. Reformed as a colony in 1959.) |
| Lambda Phi | 1964–1973, 1990–199x ? | Quinnipiac University | Hamden, CT | Inactive | (Note: Started as a colony in 1963. Reformed as a colony in 1986.) |
| Mu Phi | 1964–2000 | PennWest Clarion | Clarion, PA | Inactive | (Note: Formed from Kappa Rho which was established in 1962.) |
| Nu Phi | 1965–1987 | Franciscan University of Steubenville | Steubenville, OH | Inactive | (Note: Formed from Omicron Alpha Kappa which was established in 1951.) |
| Xi Phi | 1966–200x ? | Hartwick College | Oneonta, NY | Inactive | (Note: Started as a colony in 1965.) |
| Omicron Phi | 1966–1999, 2016 | Utica University | Utica, NY | Active | (Note: Formed from Sigma Iota Beta which was established in 1946. Reformed from the Blackbirds in 2013.) |
| **Pi Phi** | 1970–199x ?, 2011 | Robert Morris University | Moon Township, PA | Active | (Note: Formed from Sigma Beta Mu which was established in 1960. Reformed as a colony in 2010.) |
| Sigma Phi | 1970–1978 | Southern Connecticut State University | New Haven, CT | Inactive | (Note: Formed from Sigma Zeta Chi which was established in 1965.) |
| Tau Phi | 1971–2002 | Alfred University | Alfred, NY | Inactive | (Note: Formed from Phi Delta Zeta which was established in 1976.) |
| Phi Kappa Beta | 1972–2000 | James Madison University | Harrisonburg, VA | Inactive | (Note: Formed from Phi Kappa Beta which was established in 1968.) |
| **Omega Phi** | 1975 | La Salle University | Philadelphia, PA | Active | (Note: Started as a colony in 1974.) |
| Rho Phi | 1976–1989 | Johnson College | Scranton, PA | Inactive | (Note: Started as a colony in 1974.) |
| Phi Alpha Chi | 1976–199x ? | East Stroudsburg University of Pennsylvania | East Stroudsburg, PA | Inactive | (Note: Formed from Alpha Chi which was established in 1965.) |
| **Phi Beta Chi** | 1977 | Radford University | Radford, VA | Active | (Note: Started as a colony in 1975.) |
| Alpha Chi Phi | 1977–200x ? | PennWest Edinboro | Edinboro, PA | Inactive | (Note: Started as a colony in 1975.) |
| **Phi Gamma Chi** | 1978 | The College of New Jersey | Ewing, NJ | Active | (Note: Started as a colony in 1977.) |
| **Delta Sigma Phi** | 1978 | Worcester Polytechnic Institute | Worcester, MA | Active | (Note: Formed from Delta Sigma Tau which was established in 1966.) |
| Phi Epsilon Omicron | 1979–2010 | Fairleigh Dickinson University, Teaneck | Teanack, NJ | Inactive | (Note: Formed from Lambda Epsilon Chi which was established in 1977.) |
| **Phi Zeta Chi** | 1980 | SUNY Geneseo | Geneseo, NY | Active | (Note: Formed from Gamma Chi which was established in 1978.) |
| **Phi Eta Chi** | 1980–199x ?, 199x ?–2001, 2013 | Stockton University | Galloway Township, NJ | Active | (Note: Started as a colony in 1979. Reformed as a colony in 2011.) |
| Phi Theta Chi | 1980–2010 | Longwood University | Farmville, VA | Inactive | (Note: Started as a colony in 1979.) |
| Phi Iota Chi | 1980–2012 | Central Michigan University | Mount Pleasant, MI | Inactive | (Note: Started as a colony in 1979.) |
| Phi Kappa Chi | 1981–2009 | Temple University Ambler | Montgomery County, PA | Inactive | (Note: Started as a colony in 1980.) |
| Sigma Tau Phi | 1981–1995, 2006–2014 | SUNY Plattsburgh | Plattsburgh, NY | Inactive | (Note: Formed from Sigma Tau Sigma which was established in 1968. Reformed as a colony in 2000.) |
| Phi Lambda Chi | 1982–199x ? | Kent State University | Kent, OH | Inactive | (Note: Started as a colony in 1980.) |
| **Phi Mu Chi** | 1983 | Lock Haven University of Pennsylvania | Lock Haven, PA | Active | (Note: Started as a colony in 1982.) |
| **Phi Nu Chi** | 1983–199x ?, 2020 | West Chester University | West Chester, PA | Active | (Note: Started as a colony in 1982. Reformed as a colony in 2019.) |
| Phi Xi Chi | 1985–1989, 2018–2022 | Towson University | Towson, MD | Inactive | (Note: Started as a colony in 1984. Reformed as a colony in 2018.) |
| Phi Omicron Chi | 1985–1993 | Fairleigh Dickinson University, Rutherford | Rutherford, NJ | Inactive | (Note: Started as a colony in 1984.) |
| Phi Pi Chi | 1986–2010 | Indiana University of Pennsylvania | Indiana County, PA | Inactive | (Note: Started as a colony in 1985.) |
| **Phi Rho Chi** | 1987–1998, 2017 | University of Massachusetts Amherst | Amherst, MA | Active | (Note: Started as a colony in 1986. Reformed as a colony in 2016.) |
| Phi Sigma Chi | 1987–2009 | SUNY Brockport | Brockport, NY | Inactive | (Note: Started as a colony in 1986.) |
| Delta Tau Chi | 1987–2009 | Albright College | Reading, PA | Inactive | (Note: Formed from Delta Tau Chi which was established in 1982.) |
| Phi Tau Chi | 1987–199x ? | SUNY University at Buffalo | Buffalo, NY | Inactive | (Note: Started as a colony in 1986.) |
| Alpha Beta Phi | 1987–2001 | Mansfield University of Pennsylvania | Mansfield, PA | Inactive | (Note: Formed from Alpha Beta which was established in 1985.) |
| Phi Omega Chi | 1988–200x ? | Massachusetts College of Liberal Arts | North Adams, MA | Inactive | (Note: Started as a colony in 1987.) |
| Beta Chi Phi | 1989–199x ? | Millersville University of Pennsylvania | Millersville, PA | Inactive | (Note: Started as a colony in 1986.) |
| Gamma Chi Phi | 1989–2000 | George Mason University | Fairfax, VA | Inactive | (Note: Started as a colony in 1988.) |
| **Phi Sigma Tau** | 1989–199x ?, xxxx ? | Kutztown University of Pennsylvania | Kutztown, PA | Active | (Note: Formed from Sigma Tau Rho which was established in 1988.) |
| Delta Chi Phi | 1989–1997 ? | Western Michigan University | Kalamazoo, MI | Inactive | (Note: Started as a colony in 1988.) |
| Epsilon Chi Phi | 1989–20xx ? | Stony Brook University | Stony Brook, NY | Inactive | (Note: Started as a colony in 1988.) |
| Phi Kappa Lambda | 1989–2017 | Northwood University | Midland, MI | Inactive | |
| Zeta Chi Phi | 1990–1996 | Southern Illinois University Carbondale | Carbondale, IL | Inactive | (Note: Started as a colony in 1988.) |
| **Eta Chi Phi** | 1990–1998, 2006 | New York Institute of Technology | New York City, NY | Active | (Note: Started as a colony in 1989. Reformed as a colony in 2001.) |
| **Theta Chi Phi** | 1991–199x ?, 2016 | Montclair State University | Montclair, NJ | Active | (Note: Started as a colony in 1989. Reformed as a colony in 2015.) |
| **Iota Chi Phi** | 1991 | Rowan University | Glassboro, NJ | Active | (Note: Started as a colony in 1989.) |
| Kappa Zeta Phi | 1992–199? | Frostburg State University | Frostburg, MD | Inactive | (Note: Formed from Kappa Zeta Chi, established in 1975.) |
| Kappa Chi Phi | 1991–2004 | Shippensburg University of Pennsylvania | Shippensburg, PA | Inactive | (Note: Started as a colony in 1990.) |
| **Lambda Chi Phi** | 1992–1994, 1997 | Drexel University | Philadelphia, PA | Active | (Note: Started as a colony in 1989. Reformed as a colony in 1995.) |
| **Mu Chi Phi colony** | 1993–2018, 2024 | University at Albany, SUNY | Albany, NY | Active | (Note: Started as a colony in 1987.) |
| Nu Chi Phi | 1993–199x ? | Wesley College | Dover, DE | Inactive | |
| Xi Chi Phi | 1993–2019 | Ramapo College | Mahwah, NJ | Inactive | (Note: Started as a colony in 1991.) |
| Omicron Chi Phi | 1994–2017 | Bloomsburg University of Pennsylvania | Bloomsburg, PA | Inactive | (Note: Formed from Phi Sigma Xi which was established in 1966.) |
| Pi Chi Phi | 1995–1999 | Elon University | Elon, NC | Inactive | (Note: Started as a colony in 1993.) |
| Rho Chi Phi | 1995–2001 | SUNY Delhi | Delhi, NY | Inactive | (Note: Formed from Gamma Delta Iota which was established in 19xx ?.) |
| Sigma Chi Phi | 1996–200x ? | PennWest California | California, PA | Inactive | (Note: Started as a colony in 1993.) |
| Tau Chi Phi | 1998–2008,2026- | Monmouth University | West Long Branch, NJ | Inactive | (Note: Started as a colony in 1996.) |
| Phi Chi Phi | 2000–2012 | Binghamton University | Binghamton, NY | Inactive | (Note: Started as a colony in 1995.) |
| Omega Chi Phi | 2008–2016 | York College of Pennsylvania | Spring Garden Township, PA | Inactive | (Note: Started as a colony in 2006.) |
| Chi Chi Phi | 2009–2015 | Ferris State University | Big Rapids, MI | Inactive | (Note: Established as a chapter in 2005.) |
| **Alpha Phi Alpha** | 2010 | Thomas Jefferson University | Philadelphia, PA | Active | (Note: Started as a colony in 2009.) |
| **Alpha Phi Beta Colony** | 2011–2022 | University of Cincinnati | Cincinnati, OH | Active | (Note: Started as a colony in 2010.) |
| **Alpha Phi Gamma** | 2012 | Pace University | New York City, NY | Active | (Note: Started as a colony in 2008.) |
| Alpha Phi Delta | 2014 | Queens College, CUNY | Queens New York City, NY | Inactive | (Note: Started as a colony in 2012.) |
| Alpha Phi Epsilon | 1996–1999 | Shepherd University | Shepherdstown, WV | Inactive | (Note: Formed from Alpha Rho Epsilon which was established in 1974.) |
| **Alpha Phi Zeta** | 2014 | Seton Hall University | South Orange, NJ | Active | (Note: Started as a colony in 2013.) |
| **Alpha Phi Eta** | April 2018 | Rutgers University–Camden | Camden, NJ | Active | (Note: Started as a colony in 2017.) |
| **Alpha Phi Theta** | 2019 | Miami University | Oxford, OH | Active | (Note: Started as a colony in 2017.) |
| Alpha Phi Iota | 2022-2024 | Coastal Carolina University | Conway, SC | Inactive | (Note: Started as a colony in 2019.) |
| | | Rochester Institute of Technology | Rochester, NY | Colony | (Note: Started as a colony in 2019.) |
| | | Lander University | Greenwood, South Carolina | Colony | (Note: Started as a colony in 2019.) |
| | | Virginia Commonwealth University | Richmond, VA | Colony | (Note: Started as a colony in 2019.) |
| | | University of Alabama | Tuscaloosa, Alabama | Colony | (Note: Started as a colony in 2019.) |

== Alumni chapters ==
=== Graduate chapters ===
- Alpha Phi Alumni Association (Purdue University)
- Alpha Phi Gamma Alumni Chapter (Pace University)
- Delta Phi Alumni Club (Rensselaer Polytechnic Institute)
- Delta Sigma Phi Alumni Association (Worcester Polytechnic Institute)
- Omicron Phi Alumni Association (Utica University)
- Phi Iota Chi Alumni Association (Central Michigan University)
- Phi Kappa Alumni/Housing Association (University of Illinois Urbana–Champaign)
- Phi Lambda Building Association (Pennsylvania State University)
- Phi Mu Chi Alumni Chapter (Lock Haven University of Pennsylvania)
- Phi Phi Club (University of Pennsylvania)
- Pi Phi Alumni Association (Robert Morris University)
- Stockton Alumni Club (Stockton University)
- Zeta Phi Alumni/Housing Corporation (Clarkson University)

=== Alumni regional clubs ===
- Albany, New York
- Atlanta, Georgia
- Baltimore, Maryland
- Boston, Massachusetts
- Buffalo, New York
- Central New Jersey
- Chicago, Illinois
- Cincinnati, Ohio
- Connecticut
- Denver, Colorado
- Detroit, Michigan
- Hartford, Connecticut
- Houston, Texas
- Louisville, Kentucky
- Mid-Florida (Tampa–Orlando)
- New York City, New York
- Philadelphia, Pennsylvania
- Pittsburgh, Pennsylvania
- Research Triangle Area (Chapel Hill–Durham–Raleigh), North Carolina
- San Francisco, California
- Southern California (Los Angeles–San Diego)
- Southern Florida (Ft. Lauderdale–Miami)
- Washington, D.C.
