= National Board for Respiratory Care =

Non-profit North American respiratory therapy credentialising organisation

- Type: Not for profit organization
- Industry: Health care
- Founded: 1960; 66 years ago
- Headquarters: Overland Park, Kansas, United States
- Area served: United States
- Website: nbrc.org

The National Board for Respiratory Care (NBRC Inc. is a non-profit organization formed in 1960 with the purpose of awarding and maintaining credentialing for Respiratory Therapists in the United States. The NBRC is the only organization in the United States which develops certification examinations for Registered Respiratory Therapists (RRTs) and Certified Respiratory Therapists (CRTs). The NBRC also offers additional specialization credentialing for respiratory practitioners that hold its certifications. The CRT and RRT designations are the standard credential in respiratory care for licensure requirements in the portions of the United States that have enacted a Respiratory Care Act. States that license respiratory therapists sometimes require the practitioner to maintain their NBRC credentialing to maintain their license to practice. The NBRC is headquartered in Overland Park, Kansas. It has been in the Kansas City metropolitan area since 1974. The NBRC is located at 10801 Mastin St, Suite 300, Overland Park, KS 66210.

== Certification levels ==
=== Entry level certification ===
Certification is the entry level and is separated as such by the NBRC. Certified Respiratory Therapists and Certified Pulmonary Function Technologists may require oversight and supervision by their advanced-practice counterparts.

=== Specialties ===
The NBRC has sub-specialties for the Respiratory Therapist designations. Both the CRT and the RRT are eligible to sit for additional credentialing but the CRT still requires the same supervision by the RRT in clinical applications.

- Sleep Disorders Specialist — The sleep disorder specialist (RRT-SDS or CRT-SDS) is a credential recognized by the American Academy of Sleep Medicine for the role of Scoring in sleep studies.
- Neonatal & Pediatric Specialist — The neonatal and pediatric specialist (RRT-NPS or CRT-NPS) is a respiratory therapist that may work in advanced care in pediatrics and neonatology centers and units.
- Adult Critical Care Specialist — The adult critical care specialist is only available to the RRT (RRT-ACCS) that is a pulmonary and hemodynamic specialist in intensive medicine in adult practice.
- Asthma Educator Specialist — The asthma educator specialist is a multi-disciplinary examination available to a wide range of health care professionals.
- Pulmonary Function Technologist — The Pulmonary Function Technology (PFT) Examination objectively measures essential tasks required of pulmonary function technologists.

== Testing ==
NBRC examinations are developed by NBRC staff and administered by PSI .

=== Examinations maintained by the NBRC ===
Candidates must have a minimum of an associate degree from a respiratory therapy education program supported by the Committee on Accreditation for Respiratory Care (CoARC) to be eligible for the TMC Examination. Credentialed practitioners may then apply for state licensure.

==== Respiratory Therapist ====
- TMC — The Therapist Multiple-Choice Examination (TMC) is designed to objectively measure essential knowledge, skills, and abilities required of entry-level respiratory therapists, as well as determine eligibility for the Clinical Simulation Examination. There are two established cut scores for the Therapist Multiple-Choice Examination. Candidate achieving the lower cut score earn the CRT credential. Candidate achieves the higher cut score earn the CRT credential and become eligible for the Clinical Simulation Examination (provided that those eligibility requirements are met and the candidate is eligible to earn the RRT credential). Candidate must be 18 years old and must have either: a minimum of an associate degree from a respiratory therapist education program accredited by the Commission on Accreditation for Respiratory Care (CoARC), or hold the Canadian Society of Respiratory Therapists (CSRT) RRT credential. The TMC consists of 160 multiple-choice questions (140 scored items and 20 pretest items) distributed among three major content areas: Patient Data Evaluation and Recommendations, Troubleshooting and Quality Control of Equipment and Infection Control, and Initiation and Modification of Interventions. Candidates are given three hours to complete the TMC Examination.
- CSE — The Clinical Simulation Examination (CSE) is a test in which the test-taker accepts the role as an autonomous respiratory therapist handling all sorts of intervention and therapy. Candidates that pass both the NBRC-TMC at the higher cut score and the NBRC-CSE will earn the RRT credential. CSE lasts 4 hours and consists of 22 separate patient management problems (20 scored and 2 pretest) designed to simulate the clinical practice of respiratory care.

==== Specialization of the Respiratory Therapist ====
- SDS — The Sleep Disorders Specialty Examination program is designed specifically for a respiratory therapist with an NBRC respiratory care credential and experience or education in the field of sleep medicine. Those who are actively certified as a Sleep Disorders Specialist are permitted to use the post-nominal letters "SDS", "RRT-SDS" or "CRT-SDS" depending on their level and preference.
- ACCS — The Adult Critical Care Specialty Examination program is designed specifically for a respiratory therapist with the RRT credential and experience in the field of adult critical care. Those who are actively certified as a Respiratory Care Adult Critical Care Specialist are permitted to use the post-nominal letters "ACCS" or "RRT-ACCS" depending on their preference.
- NPS — The Neonatal/Pediatric Respiratory Care Specialty Examination is designed specifically for a respiratory therapist with an NBRC respiratory care credential and experience in the field of neonatal/pediatric care. Those who are actively certified as a Neonatal/Pediatric Specialist are permitted to use the post-nominal letters "NPS", "RRT-NPS" or "CRT-NPS" depending on their level and preference.

==== Pulmonary Function Technologist ====
- PFT - The Pulmonary Function Technologist Examination is designed to objectively measure essential knowledge, skills, and abilities required of pulmonary function technologists. There are two established cut scores for the Pulmonary Function Technologist Examination. If a candidate achieves the lower cut score, he or she will earn the Certified Pulmonary Function Technologist (CPFT) credential. If a candidate achieves the higher cut score, he or she will earn the Registered Pulmonary Function Technologist (RPFT) credential.

==== Asthma Educator Specialist ====
- AE-C - The Asthma Educator Specialty Examination is designed to measure comprehensive, current knowledge of asthma pathophysiology and management including developmental theories, cultural dimensions, the impact of chronic illness, and principles of teaching-learning. If a candidate passes the test, he or she will earn the Asthma Educator Specialist (AE-C) credential.

== Related organizations ==
- Institute for Credentialing Excellence (ICE)
- National Commission for Certifying Agencies (the NBRC maintains accreditation of its programs through this organization and ICE)
- American Association of Respiratory Care (AARC)
- Commission on Accreditation of Allied Health Education Programs
- Commission on Accreditation for Respiratory Care
- Lambda Beta Society
- American Thoracic Society
- American Society of Anesthesiologists
- American College of Chest Physicians

== See also ==
- Respiratory care
- Respiratory therapy
- American Association for Respiratory Care
