= Orion Technical College =

Private trade school in Davenport, Iowa, US

- Motto: To educate for a rewarding career
- Type: Private for-profit technical college
- Established: 1969
- President: Maryanne Hamilton
- Location: Davenport, Iowa, United States; 41.58°N 90.56°W
- Campus: Midsize city
- Website: orion.edu

Orion Technical College is a private for-profit technical college in Davenport, Iowa, United States.

== History ==
Hamilton Technical College was founded in 1969 by Charles and Maryanne Hamilton as the Academy of Radio and Television (A.R.T.) in Bettendorf, Iowa. The first classes were held for six students around the dinner table of the Hamiltons and the first curriculum was focused on passing the Federal Communications Commission (FCC) exam. Curriculum was then expanded to prepare students to become broadcasters. The first formal classes began in 1970 at 1120 State Street in Bettendorf, Iowa. To accommodate a growing number of students, classes were moved to a larger building on State Street.

In 1978 an Electronics program was added and A.R.T acquired recognition as a Technical College specializing in Electronics Engineering Technology. The school was then renamed A.R.T. Technical College. The Electronics Engineering program offered was for an associate degree attainable in just 18 months. In 1980 the name was changed to Hamilton Technical College.

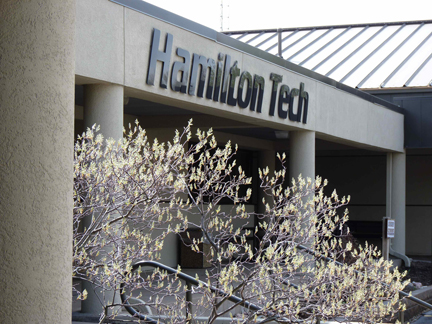
Hamilton Technical College front entrance

From 1980-1991 there were many changes. An Aviation Maintenance Technology program was added, with classes being held at the Davenport Municipal Airport in Mt. Joy, Iowa. The Hamilton Institute of Business, a branch of Hamilton Tech began offering an Associate of Occupational Technology degree in Computer Information Systems.

In 1990, Hamilton began the Computer-Aided Drafting program offering an Associate of Occupational Studies in 19 months. The following year, the college moved all classes to their current location at 10111 53rd Street in Davenport, Iowa. That year, the aerotech program also ended. Also in 1991, the Medical Assisting Technology program began which earned students a diploma in just 9 months.

In the summer of 2006, Hamilton Technical College began construction and remodeling of the current buildings. The building at the East end has been renovated to house the Advanced Electronics Center. Many equipment improvements have been made in this area. Some of the equipment that was added include: CNC Lathe, Mill, Industrial Robotics, Oscilloscopes, and computer testing equipment. The West end of the building currently houses the Medical Assisting program as well as the Development Center.

Currently, Hamilton Technical College offers an Associate and Bachelor of Science Degrees in electronics engineering technology, a diploma in medical assisting technology, and a diploma in medical insurance coding and billing.

In 2020, Hamilton Technical College changed their name to Orion Technical College. With this name change also brings along the addition of a sister campus known as the Orion Institute in Toledo, Ohio. The next year, they moved into the old Gander Mountain building, also in Davenport.

== Students and faculty ==
Orion Technical College has approximately 300 students. There are approximately 25 full-time staff and 5 part-time staff.

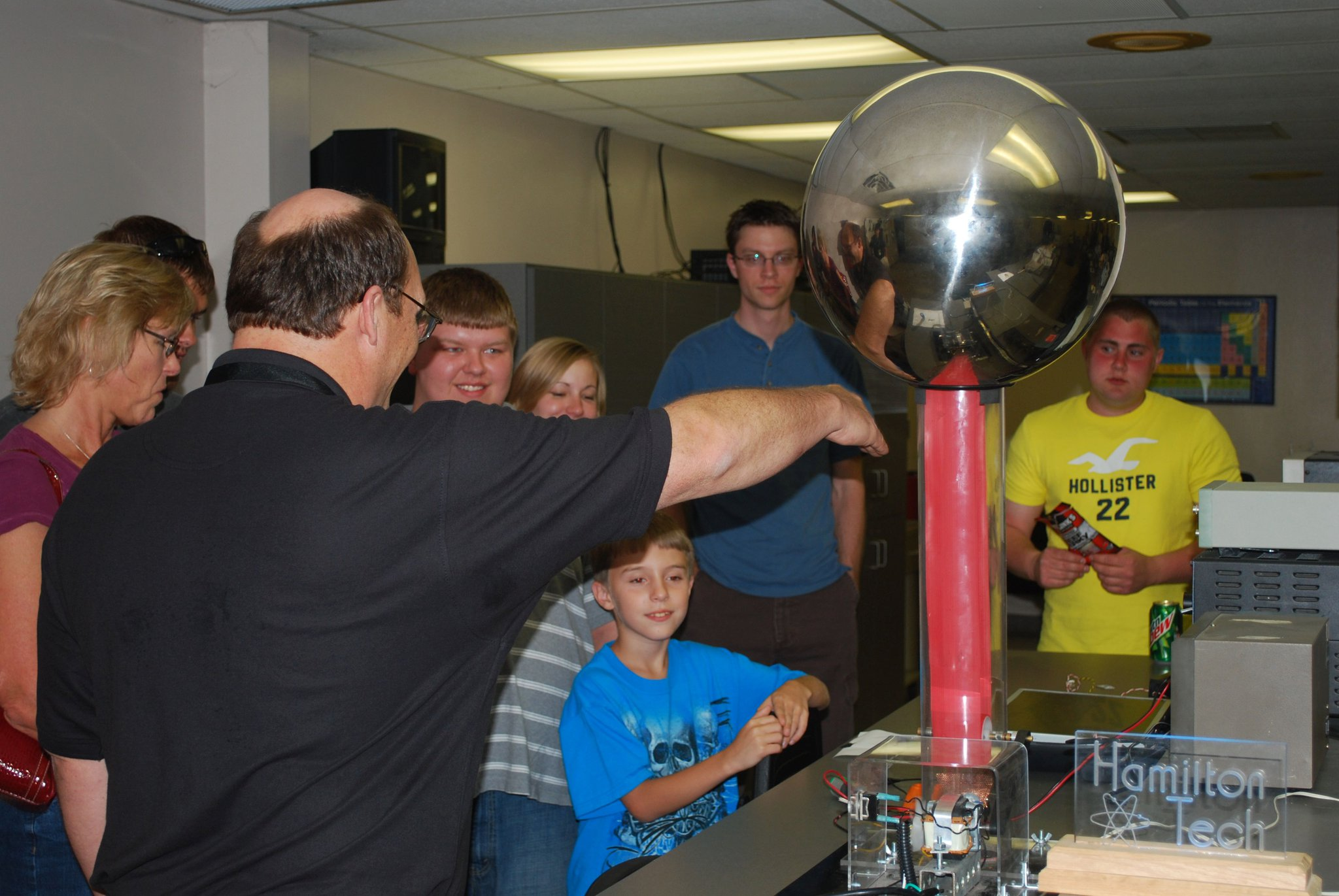
Hamilton Technical College instructor with students

== Academics ==
The Electronics Engineering Technology program offers either an Associate or a Bachelor's degree program. Medical assisting and medical insurance billing and coding are ten-month diploma programs. Both day and night programs are offered.

Orion is accredited by the Accrediting Commission of Career Schools and Colleges (ACCSC).

== Notable alumni ==
- Spike O'Dell - radio host
