= Beckfield College =

Public university in Springdale, Ohio, US

- Former names: Educational Services Center (1984-1989); Kentucky Career Institute (1989-2001)
- Type: Private for-profit college
- Established: 1984; 42 years ago
- Founder: Harry L. Beck
- Accreditation: Accrediting Bureau of Health Education Schools
- President: Diana Lawrence
- Location: Florence, Kentucky, United States; 39.0171°N 84.6413°W
- Colors: Blue & white
- Website: beckfield.edu

Beckfield College is a private for-profit college in Florence, Kentucky. It was founded in 1984 by Harry L. Beck. It offers degree and diploma programs focused on career-oriented education such as nursing, healthcare, and business.

== History ==
The college was founded in 1984 by Harry L. Beck under the name "Educational Services Center".
