= Higher education accreditation in the United States =

University accreditation in the U.S., a peer-review process

Higher education accreditation in the United States is a peer review process by which the validity of degrees and credits awarded by higher education institutions is assured. It is coordinated by accreditation commissions made up of member institutions. It was first undertaken in the late 19th century by cooperating educational institutions, on a regional basis.

The federal government began to play a limited role in higher education accreditation in 1952 with reauthorization of the G.I. Bill for veterans of the Korean War. The original GI Bill legislation had stimulated establishment of new colleges and universities to accommodate the influx of new students, but some of these new institutions were of dubious quality. The 1952 legislation designated the existing peer review process as the basis for measuring institutional quality; GI Bill eligibility was limited to students enrolled at accredited institutions included on a list of federally recognized accredited institutions published by the U.S. Commissioner of Education.

The U.S. Department of Education and the Council for Higher Education Accreditation (CHEA) (a non-governmental organization) both recognize reputable accrediting bodies for institutions of higher education and provide guidelines as well as resources and relevant data regarding these accreditors. Neither the U.S. Department of Education nor CHEA accredit individual institutions. With the creation of the U.S. Department of Education and under the terms of the Higher Education Act of 1965, as amended, the U.S. secretary of education is required by law to publish a list of nationally recognized accrediting agencies that the secretary has determined to be reliable authorities on the quality of education or training provided by the institutions of higher education and the higher education programs they accredit.

== Overview ==
Institutional accreditation applies to the entire institution, specific programs, and distance education within an institution.

=== Regional and national accreditation ===
The higher education institutions holding regional accreditation were primarily non-profit institutions, with significant exceptions, as the largest US for-profit universities (e.g., University of Phoenix, Grand Canyon University) achieved regional accreditation.

Regionally accredited schools were usually academically oriented and most were non-profit. Nationally accredited schools, a large number of which are for-profit, typically offered specific vocational, career, or technical programs. Regionally accredited institutions employed large numbers of full-time faculty, and the faculty set the academic policies. Regionally-accredited schools were required to have adequate library facilities. Except for some specific subject areas such as nursing, nationally accredited schools did not hire many full-time faculty, usually hiring faculty by the course, without benefits and with no influence on the school's academic policies, which were determined by non-academic administrators, and ultimately investors. Their library facilities, if they existed at all, were far inferior to those of regionally-accredited schools. While there were some legitimate and well-intentioned nationally accredited schools, similar to for-profit institutions with regional accreditation, some institutions existed with little educational rigor. Some critics considered national accreditation to be not as reputable as regional accreditation. Schools accredited by the Accrediting Commission of Career Schools and Colleges, a national accreditor, were occasionally sued for leading prospective students to believe, incorrectly, that they would have no problem transferring their credits to a regionally accredited school.

== History ==
Historically, educational accreditation activities in the United States were overseen by seven regional accrediting agencies established in the late 19th and early 20th century to foster articulation between secondary schools and higher education institutions, particularly evaluation of prospective students by colleges and universities. These seven agencies were membership organizations of educational institutions within their geographic regions. Initially, the main focus of the organizations was to accredit secondary schools and to establish uniform college entrance requirements. Accreditation of colleges and universities followed later, with each of the accrediting agencies splitting into separate organizations with one or more of those organizations focused exclusively on accrediting colleges and universities.

Prior to 2020, there were regional and national accrediting agencies, both of which were accountable to the Department of Education. Regional bodies historically accredited institutions in a particular region of the country. National bodies were established to accredit institutions across the country, and sometimes beyond it. Within American higher education, regional bodies were considered more prestigious. The regional bodies were older, and included the most well established institutions.

In February 2020, the Department of Education eliminated the distinction between regional and national accrediting agencies, creating one unified set of institutional accreditors. The department claimed that the change was intended to encourage cooperation between accredited schools to improve student experiences, uphold quality standards, and reduce the cost of higher education by encouraging transparent transfer of credits and mutual recognition of degrees between schools with common standards. It also claimed that the change was intended to allow students to be able to access the best school for their needs no matter what region they reside in.

Four months after this change was made, the WASC Senior College and University Commission became the first accreditor to formally change its membership rules and requirements to allow institutions outside its historical geographic region to apply for membership and accreditation.

In the early 2020s, conservative state legislators and governors in several states moved beyond criticizing institutional accreditors to begin passing legislation attacking accreditors' independence and authority. In 2022, after the Southern Association of Colleges and Schools Commission on Colleges questioned the candidacy of Richard Corcoran as he campaigned to become president of Florida State University, the state passed a law requiring every public college and university to change institutional accreditors every time their accreditation is due to be renewed. The following year, North Carolina passed a similar law. In subsequent years, SACSCOC also posed questions as several states began to pass laws and create policies and practices dismantling diversity, equity, and inclusion (DEI) work at colleges and universities.

In June 2025, Florida governor Ron DeSantis announced that six public university system in southern states—the State University System of Florida, Texas A&M University System, University System of Georgia, University of North Carolina System, University of South Carolina System, and University of Tennessee System—were collaborating to form a new institutional accreditor, the Commission for Public Higher Education.

== Recognized institutional accreditors ==
The U.S. Department of Education recognizes the following organizations as institutional accreditors:

- Academy of Nutrition and Dietetics, Accreditation Council for Education in Nutrition and Dietetics
- Accrediting Bureau of Health Education Schools
- Accreditation Commission for Acupuncture and Herbal Medicine
- Accreditation Commission for Education in Nursing
- Accrediting Commission of Career Schools and Colleges
- Accrediting Council for Continuing Education and Training
- American Bar Association
- American Board of Funeral Service Education
- American Osteopathic Association
- American Podiatric Medical Association
- Association for Biblical Higher Education
- Association of Advanced Rabbinical and Talmudic Schools
- Association of Institutions of Jewish Studies
- Association of Theological Schools
- Commission on English Language Program Accreditation
- Commission on Massage Therapy Accreditation
- Council on Accreditation of Nurse Anesthesia Educational Programs
- Council on Chiropractic Education
- Distance Education Accrediting Commission
- Higher Learning Commission
- Joint Review Committee on Education in Radiologic Technology
- Middle States Commission on Higher Education
- Middle States Commission on Secondary Schools
- Midwifery Education Accreditation Council
- Montessori Accreditation Council for Teacher Education
- National Accrediting Commission of Career Arts and Sciences
- National Association of Schools of Art and Design
- National Association of Schools of Dance
- National Association of Schools of Music
- National Association of Schools of Theatre
- New England Commission of Higher Education
- New York State Board of Regents, and the Commissioner of Education
- Northwest Commission on Colleges and Universities
- Southern Association of Colleges and Schools
- Transnational Association of Christian Colleges and Schools
- WASC Accrediting Commission for Community and Junior Colleges
- WASC Senior College and University Commission

=== Formerly recognized accreditors ===
- Accrediting Council for Independent Colleges and Schools
- American Academy for Liberal Education

== Programmatic accreditation ==
These accreditors typically cover a specific program of professional education or training, but in some cases they cover the whole institution. Best practices are shared and developed through affiliation with the Association of Professional and Specialized Accreditors. Both the US Department of Education and CHEA maintain lists of recognized US programmatic accreditors:

Organization	Acronym	CHEA Recognized?	USDE Recognized?	Note
Accreditation Commission for Acupuncture and Herbal Medicine	ACAOM	No	Yes	
Accreditation Commission for Audiology Education	ACAE	Yes	No	
Accreditation Commission for Education in Nursing	ACEN	Yes	Yes	
Accreditation Commission for Midwifery Education	ACME	No	Yes	Not eligible for Title IV funding
Accreditation Council for Business Schools and Programs	ACBSP	Yes	No	
Accreditation Council for Education in Nutrition and Dietetics, Academy of Nutrition and Dietetics	ACEND	No	Yes	
Accreditation Council for Pharmacy Education	ACPE	Yes	Yes	Not eligible for Title IV funding
Accreditation Council on Optometric Education	ACOE	Yes	Yes	Not eligible for Title IV funding
Accreditation Review Commission on Education for the Physician Assistant	ARC-PA	Yes	No	
Accrediting Bureau of Health Education Schools	ABHES	No	Yes	
Accrediting Council on Education in Journalism and Mass Communications	ACEJMC	Yes	No	
American Academy of Forensic Sciences Forensic Science Education Programs Accreditation Commission	AAFS-FEPAC	Yes	No	
American Association of Family and Consumer Sciences, Council for Accreditation	AAFCS-CFA	Yes	No	
American Board of Funeral Service Education, Committee on Accreditation	ABFSE	Yes	Yes	
American Council for Construction Education	ACCE	Yes	No	
American Culinary Federation Education Foundation, Accrediting Commission	ACFEF-AC	Yes	No	
American Library Association, Committee on Accreditation	ALA-CoA	Yes	No	
American Occupational Therapy Association, Accreditation Council for Occupational Therapy Education	AOTA-ACOTE	Yes	Yes	Not eligible for Title IV funding
American Osteopathic Association, Commission on Osteopathic College Accreditation	AOA-COCA	No	Yes	
American Physical Therapy Association, Commission on Accreditation in Physical Therapy Education	APTA-CAPTE	Yes	Yes	Not eligible for Title IV funding
American Podiatric Medical Association, Council on Podiatric Medical Education	APMA-CPME	Yes	Yes	
American Psychological Association, Commission on Accreditation	APA-CoA	Yes	Yes	Not eligible for Title IV funding
American Veterinary Medical Association, Council on Education	AVMA-COE	Yes	Yes	Not eligible for Title IV funding
Association for Advancing Quality in Educator Preparation	AAQEP	Yes	No	
Association for Behavior Analysis International Accreditation Board	ABAI	Yes	No	
Association for Biblical Higher Education Commission on Accreditation	ABHE	Yes	Yes	
Association for Clinical Pastoral Education, Accreditation Commission	ACPE Inc	No	Yes	Not eligible for Title IV funding
Association of Technology, Management, and Applied Engineering	ATMAE	Yes	No	
Aviation Accreditation Board International	AABI	Yes	No	
Commission on Accreditation for Health Informatics and Information Management Education	CAHIIM	Yes	No	
American Association for Marriage and Family Therapy	COAMFTE-AAMFT	Yes	No	
Commission on Accreditation for Respiratory Care	CoARC	Yes	No	
Commission on Accreditation of Allied Health Education Programs	CAAHEP	Yes	No	
Commission on Accreditation of Athletic Training Education	CAATE	Yes	No	
Commission on Accreditation of Healthcare Management Education	CAHME	Yes	No	
Commission on Accreditation of Medical Physics Education Programs	CAMPEP	Yes	No	
Commission on Collegiate Nursing Education	CCNE	No	Yes	Not eligible for Title IV funding
American Dental Association	CODA	No	Yes	Not eligible for Title IV funding
Commission on English Language Program Accreditation	CEA	No	Yes	Not eligible for Title IV funding
Commission on Massage Therapy Accreditation	COMTA	No	Yes	
Commission on Opticianry Accreditation	COA-OP	Yes	No	
Commission on Sport Management Accreditation	COSMA	Yes	No	
Council for Accreditation of Counseling and Related Educational Programs	CACREP	Yes	No	
Council for Interior Design Accreditation	CIDA	Yes	No	
Council for Standards in Human Service Education	CSHSE	Yes	No	
Council for the Accreditation of Educator Preparation	CAEP	Yes	No	
American Bar Association	ABA	No	Yes	
American Speech-Language-Hearing Association	CAA-ASHA	Yes	Yes	Not eligible for Title IV funding
Council on Accreditation of Nurse Anesthesia Educational Programs	COA	Yes	Yes	
Council on Accreditation of Parks, Recreation, Tourism and Related Professions	COAPRT	Yes	No	
Council on Chiropractic Education	CCE	Yes	Yes	
Council on Education for Public Health	CEPH	No	Yes	Not eligible for Title IV funding
Council on Naturopathic Medical Education	CNME	No	Yes	Not eligible for Title IV funding
Council on Social Work Education, Commission on Accreditation	CSWE-COA	Yes	No	
International Accreditation Council for Business Education	IACBE	Yes	No	
International Fire Service Accreditation Congress - Degree Assembly	IFSAC-DA	Yes	No	
Joint Review Committee on Education in Radiologic Technology	JRCERT	Yes	Yes	
Joint Review Committee on Educational Programs in Nuclear Medicine Technology	JRCNMT	Yes	No	
American Society of Landscape Architects	LAAB-ASLA	Yes	No	
Liaison Committee on Medical Education	LCME	No	Yes	Not eligible for Title IV funding
Masters in Psychology and Counseling Accreditation Council	MPCAC	Yes	No	
Midwifery Education Accreditation Council	MEAC	No	Yes	
Montessori Accreditation Council for Teacher Education	MACTE	No	Yes	
National Accrediting Agency for Clinical Laboratory Sciences	NAACLS	Yes	No	
National Association for the Education of Young Children	NAEYC	Yes	No	
National Association of Schools of Art and Design Commission on Accreditation	NASAD	No	Yes	
National Association of Schools of Dance Commission on Accreditation	NASD	No	Yes	
National Association of Schools of Music Commission on Accreditation	NASM	No	Yes	
National Association of Schools of Theatre Commission on Accreditation	NAST	No	Yes	
National Council for Accreditation of Teacher Education	NCATE	Yes	Yes	
Network of Schools of Public Policy, Affairs, and Administration, Commission on Peer Review and Accreditation	NASPAA-COPRA	Yes	No	
Planning Accreditation Board	PAB	Yes	No	
Psychological Clinical Science Accreditation System	PCSAS	Yes	No	
Teacher Education Accreditation Council	TEAC	Yes	Yes	

=== Other recognized accreditors ===
The State Bar of California Committee of Bar Examiners accredits law schools in California and is not recognized by the U.S. Department of Education or CHEA.

== Religious accreditors ==
Although many schools related to religious organizations hold regional accreditation or secular national accreditation, there are four different agencies that specialize in accreditation of religious schools:

- Association of Advanced Rabbinical and Talmudic Schools (AARTS)
- Association of Theological Schools in the United States and Canada (ATS)
- Association for Biblical Higher Education (ABHE)
- Transnational Association of Christian Colleges and Schools (TRACS)

These groups specialize in accrediting theological and religious schools including seminaries and graduate schools of theology, as well as broader-scope universities that teach from a religious viewpoint and may require students and/or faculty to subscribe to a statement of faith. Additionally, as of 2009, 20 U.S. states and Puerto Rico had some form of exemption provision under which religious institutions can grant religious degrees without accreditation or government oversight.

== Use of .edu top-level Internet domain ==
Since 2001, the use of the top-level internet domain, .edu has been restricted to accredited institutions, but non-qualifying institutions can still use .edu domain names obtained before the current rules came into force. A prominent example of such a domain name registered before the current rules came into force is Academia.edu, a for-profit social networking site for academics.

== Criticism ==
Various commenters have written about the role and effectiveness of the American accreditation system. It has drawn particular interest since the rise of e-learning classes and institutions. A frequent point of discussion and criticism is that the traditional system is limited to measuring "input" factors, such as instructional time for course credit, adequate facilities and properly credentialed faculty, rather than learning outcomes.

In his 1996 book Crisis in the Academy, Christopher J. Lucas criticized the accreditation system as too expensive, onerously complicated, incestuous in its organization, and not properly tied to quality. Similarly, a 2002 report by George C. Leef and Roxana D. Burris of the American Council of Trustees and Alumni (ACTA) argued that the system does not ensure or protect educational quality, while still imposing significant costs. In a 2006 "issue paper", Robert C. Dickeson wrote that a lack of transparency, low and lax standards, and outdated regionalization were among the problems with regional accreditation. Others, such as Edward M. Elmendorf of the American Association of State Colleges and Universities, reject these claims, arguing that they are "picking around the edges" of a proven and necessary system for upholding standards. Thomas C. Reeves notes that some schools unable or unwilling to meet the standards of traditional, regional accrediting bodies are closely involved in creating national accrediting agencies with significantly lower standards.

At various times the U.S. government has investigated changes to the accreditation system. In 2002, the House of Representatives Subcommittee on 21st Century Competitiveness criticized the system. Accreditation was a major topic of the Spellings Commission, which released its report on September 26, 2006. The Council for Higher Education Accreditation recognizes that there are criticisms, but has opposed these calls for reform, with President Judith S. Eaton arguing that the system is successful and needs to remain flexible to accommodate differences between schools and disciplines. In 2013, President Barack Obama proposed changes in the accreditation system to hold "colleges accountable for cost, value, and quality". He requested Congress change the Higher Education Act so that affordability and value are considered in determining which institutions are accredited and allow students access to federal financial aid; his criticism was directed at for-profit institutions.

== See also ==
- List of recognized higher education accreditation organizations
- List of unrecognized higher education accreditation organizations
- Accreditation mill
