= Ultimate Medical Academy =

Healthcare school in Florida, United States

- Type: Private, Allied health professions
- Established: 1993
- Accreditation: Accrediting Bureau of Health Education Schools
- Chair: Darlyne Bailey, Ph.D.
- President: Thomas Rametta
- Academic staff: 783
- Total staff: 1,759
- Students: 29,017
- Location: Clearwater, Florida; 12.34°N 98.76°W
- Website: www.ultimatemedical.edu

Ultimate Medical Academy (UMA) is a nonprofit career education school that grants associate degrees and diplomas in allied health professions.

UMA also has a continuing medical education (CME) division that provides training to more than 50,000 physicians, nurses and other medical professionals annually.

As of July 2024, UMA has more than 90,000 alumni and more than 15,000 students nationwide.

== Licensure and accreditation ==
UMA is institutionally accredited by the Accrediting Bureau of Health Education Schools. UMA's Health Information Management program is programmatically accredited by the Commission on Accreditation for Health Informatics and Information Management Education (CAHIIM).

== History ==
The school first operated in Clearwater, FL in 1993 as Ultimate Learning Center, Inc. In January 2005, Ultimate Medical Academy, LLC acquired the school and expanded its program offerings, including the launch of online programs in 2009.

In 2014, Ultimate Medical Academy was granted a charter of the Alpha Beta Kappa National Honor Society. UMA's chapter name is Epsilon Gamma of Florida Chapter. Clinical and Patient Educators Association acquired Ultimate Medical Academy in March 2015.

In 2022, UMA launched a new Emergency Medical Technician diploma program to train new emergency medical technicians in the Tampa Bay area. This training program was developed in response to record high turnover among EMTs.

In September 2023, UMA Education, Inc., the organization that operates Ultimate Medical Academy, acquired American Institute, a career education school focused on healthcare training with five campus locations in Connecticut and New Jersey.

In 2024, the Tampa City Council recognized Ultimate Medical Academy for 30 years of operation. Later that year the Florida Association of Postsecondary Schools and Colleges named UMA their School of the Year. UMA also earned recognition from Seramount, a professional services and research firm dedicated to advancing high-performing, inclusive workplaces, for being one of the best places to work for multicultural women and executive women.

== Partner Schools ==
UMA maintains articulation agreements with several education partners with both online and in-person programs.

- University of Arizona Global Campus
- Bellevue University
- Eastern International College
- Excelsior University
- Florida A&M University
- Purdue University Global
- Southern New Hampshire University
- Western Governors University
- Pinellas Technical College

== Programs ==
Ultimate Medical Academy offers diploma and associate degree healthcare programs at its campus in Clearwater and online.

=== On-campus associate degrees ===
- Dental assistant with expanded functions
- Medical assistant

=== On-campus diplomas ===
- Nursing assistant
- Patient care technician
- Phlebotomy assistant

=== Online associate degrees ===
- Health information management
- Medical administrative assistant
- Medical office and billing specialist
- Pharmacy technician
- Health and human services
- Healthcare accounting
- Healthcare management
- Medical billing and coding

=== Diplomas ===
- Medical administrative assistant
- Medical office and billing specialist
- Medical billing and coding
