= American Career College =

For-profit vocational college based in California

- Type: Private for-profit college
- Established: 1978
- Founder: David Pyle
- Location: Irvine, California, United States
- Website: americancareercollege.edu

American Career College is a private for-profit vocational college focused on healthcare education with three campuses in California: Los Angeles, Ontario, and Anaheim. It also has a campus in Richardson, Texas. It is accredited by the Accrediting Bureau of Health Education Schools.

== History ==
American Career College was founded by David Pyle in 1978 as the American College of Optics, which specialized in optical dispensing. The name was changed to the American College of Optechs in 1990 before becoming the American Career College in 1993. The college's enrollment increased following the approval of its nursing program in 1994 and the vocational nursing program in 2001. The Ontario campus opened in 2008. ACC's sister school West Coast University holds some classes for ACC on its campus and credits can be transferred between the two institutions.

In 2020, 79% of enrolled students were female and 58% identified as Hispanic/Latinx.
