= Carrington College (US) =

US network of for-profit private colleges

Coordinates: 38.551622°N 121.412956°W

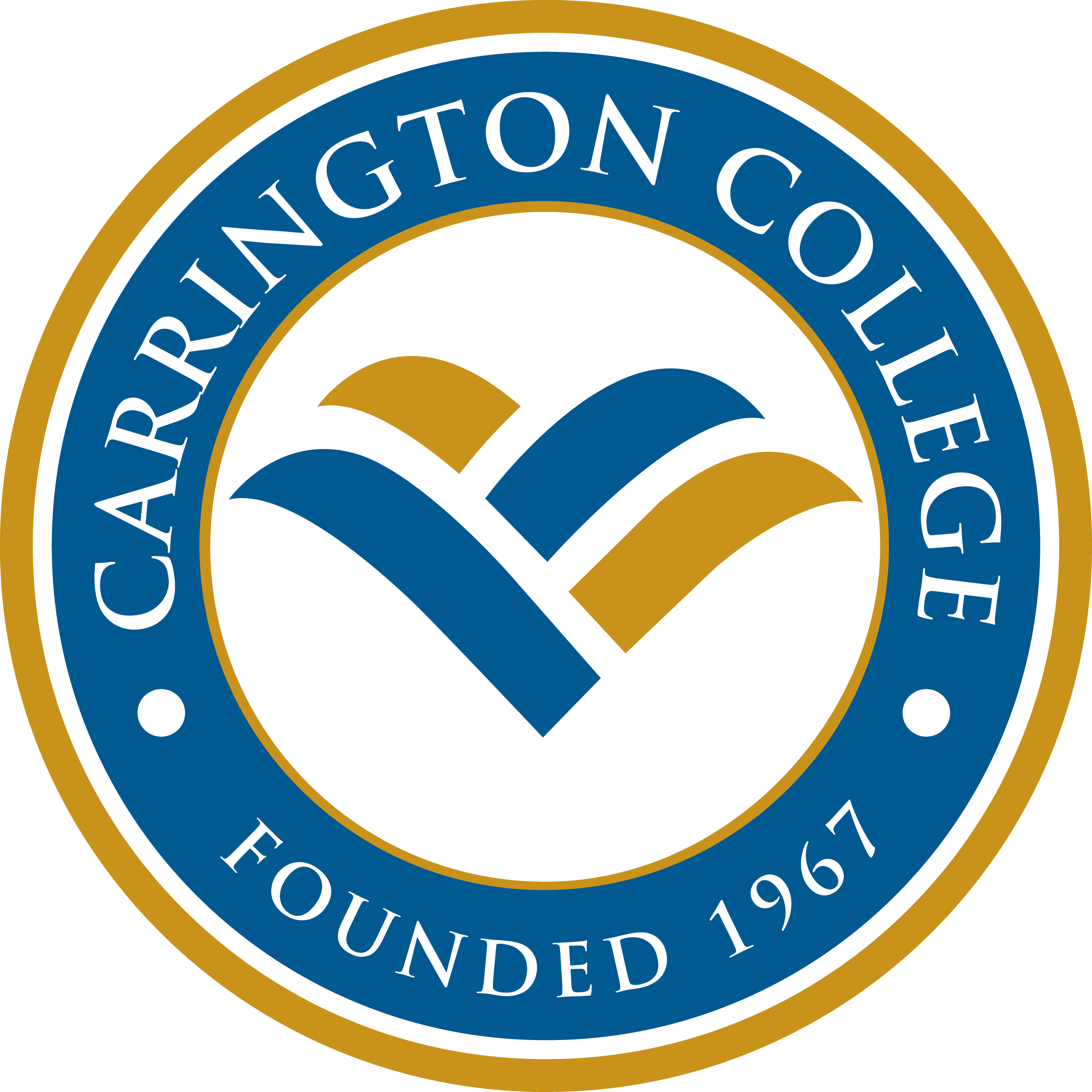
- Former names: U.S. Education Corporation; Carrington College Group; Carrington College California; Apollo College; Western Career College
- Type: Private for-profit college network
- Established: 1967; 59 years ago
- Parent institution: San Joaquin Valley College
- President: Nick Gomez
- Students: 8,000+
- Location: Sacramento, California, U.S.
- Campus: Multiple, 14
- Colors: Blue and gold
- Website: carrington.edu

Carrington College is a network of for-profit private colleges with its headquarters in Sacramento, California. The school has 14 locations throughout the Western United States with a total enrollment of 8,097 and more than 132,000 alumni.

The school confers Certificates and associate degrees as well as four online Bachelor of Science degrees.

In 2025, Nick Gomez was named as president of Carrington College, which is owned by San Joaquin ValleyCollege.

== History ==
Carrington College was founded in 1967 in Sacramento, California as the Northwest College of Medical Assistants and Dental Assistants.

In 1969, Northwest College of Medical and Dental Assistants was purchased by Bryman Schools who renamed it Western College of Allied Health Careers.

The Education Corporation of America ("EdCOA, Inc.") purchased the college in 1983 and changed its name to Western Career College (WCC). In 1986, WCC opened a second campus in San Leandro, California. A third campus opened in 1997 in Pleasant Hill, California.

WCC earned regional accreditation by the Accrediting Commission for Community and Junior Colleges of the Western Association of Schools and Colleges in June 2001.

In December 2003, U.S. Education Corporation acquired Western Career College along with Apollo College. Founded in 1976, Apollo focused preparing students for careers in healthcare and offered certificate and associate degree programs. Although offering similar programs, the two institutions were operated independently.

DeVry Inc acquired U.S. Education Corporation in September 2008. Two years later, DeVry changed the name of Western Career College to Carrington College California and Apollo College was renamed Carrington College. Together, these institutions became known within DeVry as the Carrington Colleges Group.

In 2014, Carrington College California received approval under the ACCJC/WASC accreditation to add the Carrington College campuses to its existing network, resulting in one consolidated institution called Carrington College.

DeVry Education Group rebranded itself as Adtalem Global Education in 2017 and sold Carrington College to San Joaquin Valley College, Inc. the following year.

In 2025, Carrington College and San Joaquin Valley College (SJVC) realigned their programs to fill a need for more healthcare workers in the Central Valley of California. As a result, Carrington took over all nursing and allied healthcare training for the two schools with SJVC assuming all business, trade, and technical courses.

== Academics ==
Carrington College campuses offer programs that lead to a Certificate of Achievement or Associate of Science Degree in multiple healthcare specialties including medical, dental, administrative, veterinary and health studies programs.

Four Bachelor of Science degrees can be earned online: Nursing (RN to BSN), Dental Hygiene, Healthcare Administration (BSHCA), and Respiratory Therapy (BSRT).

=== Curriculum ===
Carrington College offers 26 programs through five areas of focus including medicine, health studies, dentistry, administration, or veterinary medicine. Some of the programs include health care administration, pharmacy technology, practical nursing, veterinary assisting, and dental assisting.

Tuition ranges from approximately $29,000 to $48,000 for some advanced programs. Students in Idaho can secure up to 80% of the published tuition and fees to a maximum of $8,000 through the Idaho LAUNCH program.

=== Accreditation ===
Carrington College is regionally accredited by the Accrediting Commission for Community and Junior Colleges.

The school is nationally accredited by the Accrediting Council for Independent Colleges and Schools (ACICS). Additionally, many of the programs are accredited by specialized accrediting bodies, which focus on specific occupational fields including:

- Accrediting Bureau of Health Education Schools for Medical Assisting
- American Society of Health-System Pharmacists
- American Veterinary Medical Association
- Commission on Accreditation of Allied Health Education Programs
- Commission on Dental Accreditation
- Committee on Accreditation for Respiratory Care
- Joint Review Committee on Education in Radiologic Technology
- National League for Nursing Accrediting Commission

== Campuses and locations ==
Carrington College has operations in Arizona, California, Idaho, New Mexico, Nevada, Oregon, and Washington.

Carrington College maintains campuses in 14 cities:

Arizona

- Mesa
- Phoenix
- Tucson

California

- Pleasant Hill
- Sacramento
- San Jose (including North San Jose)
- San Leandro
- Stockton

Idaho

- Boise

New Mexico

- Albuquerque

Nevada

- Las Vegas
- Reno

Oregon

- Portland

Washington

- Spokane

== Additional information ==
Carrington College had 935 full-time and 179 part-time employees as of 2012. The school is among the largest producers of medical assistants for the Spokane, WA area and produced 25% of all respiratory therapists in California in 2019.
