= IBMC College =

Private college in northern Colorado, US

- Type: Private for-profit career college
- Established: 1987
- Students: 1,200 (full and part-time)
- Location: Fort Collins, Colorado, United States
- Website: ibmc.edu

IBMC College is a private for-profit career college with 3 campuses in northern Colorado. The college is headquartered in Fort Collins, Colorado. This accelerated for-profit career training institution has additional campuses in Longmont and Greeley.

== History ==
IBMC College was founded in 1987 in Fort Collins, Colorado, operating originally as the Medical Careers Training Center. The college was owned and operated by The Laub Company, Inc. since 1991. The college was then purchased by DVMD, LLC. in October 2023, adding to the companies list of schools including IntelliTec College, Asher College and as of January 2025, Euphoria Institute of Beauty Arts and Sciences.

This college provides career training to adult learners, job placement assistance to graduates and is nationally accredited by the Accrediting Commission of Career Schools and Colleges.

In June 1995 the college moved from its original location in Fort Collins, Colorado to a larger campus in the city at 3842 South Mason Street and began broadening their program areas. In 2005, IBMC expanded the college by opening a branch campus in Cheyenne, Wyoming and later re-locating to a larger facility in the heart of the city at 1854 Dell Range Boulevard. This was followed by more expansion in February 2008, when a second branch campus was instituted in Greeley, Colorado and later moved to a larger facility in Greeley in 2013. A fourth campus debuted in September 2010 in Longmont, CO. Within a year of opening this newest campus, it was necessary to double the size of the campus to meeting growing career training needs in the region.

IBMC's Fort Collins college campus is 65 miles north of Denver. This campus contains a dental lab and suite, student beauty services clinic for cosmetology students, medical laboratories, computer labs, lecture classrooms, massage classrooms, massage clinic rooms for student externs and graduates to provide massages to the public, a law library research center and bookstore.

The IBMC College campus in Cheyenne, Wyoming opened in the spring of 2005 in the heart of Cheyenne, off Dell Range Boulevard. The expanding campus contains classrooms, lecture rooms, cosmetology suite, medical labs, computer labs, a student resource center and student lounge area. A student and graduate massage clinic is also on-site. The Cheyenne campus was closed in October 2017

In February 2008, IBMC opened its campus in Greeley, CO to serve adults in the Weld County regions. Due to increasing demand, the campus re-located to a 23,300 square foot location at 2863 35th Avenue. Students have access to computer labs, cosmetology suite, medical labs, business classrooms, paralegal library and lecture classrooms. This campus is also home to a school store and a student lounge.

In September 2010, IBMC opened a third branch campus in Longmont, CO at 2315 North Main Street. This campus provides a professional environment and offers the following features: computer classrooms, business simulated office pods, dental suite, cosmetology suite, medical labs, law library, and lecture classrooms for all programs. The campus also has a resource center/library and student lounge for study and homework. Private, spa-like rooms make up the massage clinic space for the public to receive discounted massages from student externs.

On May 1, 2015, IBMC College acquired Intellitec Medical Institute in Colorado Springs, CO located at 6805 Corporate Drive, Suite #100. This 43,00 square foot campus offers programs in business, dental assisting, esthetician, healthcare, massage and personal training. Career and externship placement assistance is provided. The Colorado Springs, campuses then closed in October, 2017

== Academics ==
IBMC College is nationally accredited by the Accrediting Commission of Career Schools and Colleges (ACCSC), which is a nationally recognized accrediting agency by the U.S. Department of Education and the Council for Higher Education Accreditation.
