= Pima Medical Institute =

American for-profit medical college chain

- Pima Medical Institute
- Motto: Trusted. Respected. Preferred.
- Type: For-profit
- Established: 1972; 54 years ago
- Chairman: Richard Luebke Jr.
- President: Liby Lentz
- CEO: Mark Luebke, Richard (Dick) Luebke Jr.
- Location: Founded in Tucson, Arizona
- Campus: 16 campuses across the western United States
- Website: pmi.edu

The Pima Medical Institute (PMI) is a private for-profit medical career college that trains students for careers as allied health care professionals with campuses throughout the western United States. PMI is the largest independently owned, private allied health school in the U.S. and is nationally accredited by the Accrediting Bureau of Health Education Schools (ABHES).

== History ==
Pima Medical Institute was founded in Tucson, Arizona, in January 1972 by Richard Luebke, Sr. and his wife, JoAnn. The first program offered was nursing assistant. Based on job demands in the community, Pima grew their programs and campuses to fill those needs, including the launch of online programs in 2006.

The company owns and operates 16 campuses across the western United States.

== Academics ==
Pima Medical Institute offers a variety of allied health care career training options. Not all programs are offered at each campus.
