= Respiratory Care (journal) =

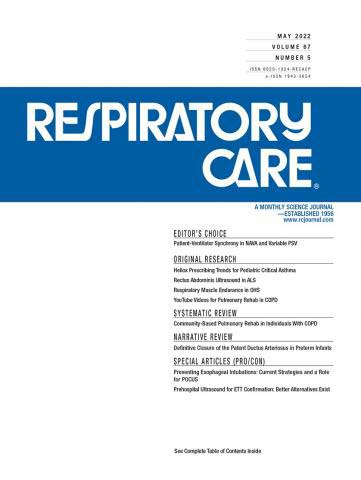
- Discipline: Respiratory therapy
- Language: English
- Edited by: Dean R. Hess

Publication details
- Former name(s): Inhalation Therapy
- History: 1956–present
- Publisher: American Association for Respiratory Care (United States)
- Frequency: Monthly
- Impact factor: 2.258 (2020)

Standard abbreviations
- ISO 4: Respir. Care

Indexing
- CODEN: RECACP
- ISSN: 0020-1324 (print); 1943-3654 (web)
- OCLC no.: 01598077

Links
- Journal homepage; Online access; Online archive

Respiratory Care is a monthly peer-reviewed medical journal published by the American Association of Respiratory Care. It is abstracted and indexed in Index Medicus/PubMed and the Science Citation Index Expanded. The editor-in-chief is Dean R. Hess (Massachusetts General Hospital and Harvard Medical School). The journal publishes original research, reviews (narrative and systematic), short reports, correspondence, and editorial articles. It was established in 1956 as Inhalation Therapy and obtained its current title in 1970. According to the Journal Citation Reports, the journal has a 2020 impact factor of 2.258.

== See also ==
- List of medical journals
- List of healthcare journals
