= Accrediting Bureau of Health Education Schools =

The Accrediting Bureau of Health Education Schools (ABHES) is a recognized higher education accreditation organization in the United States specializing in the institutional accreditation of private, postsecondary institutions that offer allied health education programs, and the programmatic accreditation of programs leading to associate degrees or certificates in the medical assistant, medical laboratory technician and surgical technology fields. The ABHES is the only healthcare education accrediting agency that is recognized by the U.S. Department of Education. In addition to recognition by the U.S. Department of Education, the ABHES is also recognized by the American Association of Medical Assistants (AAMA), the American Medical Technologists (AMT) and the Liaison Council for Certification of Surgical Technologists (LLC-ST).

== ABHES-accredited schools (partial list) ==
- ACT College
- American Career College
- Brookline College
- City College - Florida
- Dewey University
- ECPI
- Fortis Institute
- The College of Health Care Professions
- Fortis College - select campuses
- Pima Medical Institute
- Ross Medical Education Center
- Stratford University
- Ultimate Medical Academy
