= Commission on Accreditation of Medical Physics Education Programs =

Medical physics education accrediting organization

The Commission on Accreditation of Medical Physics Education Programs (CAMPEP) is a nonprofit organization that accredits educational and training programs in medical physics. It was established as a separate organization in 1994, following earlier accreditation activities of the American Association of Physicists in Medicine.

In 2017, the Council for Higher Education Accreditation recognized CAMPEP for accreditation of graduate, residency, professional doctorate, and certificate programs in the United States and Canada.

In 2014, the American Board of Radiology made completion of a CAMPEP-accredited residency a requirement for its Part 2 qualifying examination in medical physics. The transition to standardized clinical training prompted debate about the availability of accredited residency positions. A 2017 review identified the imbalance between graduate education and residency capacity as a bottleneck in the supply of new clinical medical physicists.

As of January 2014, CAMPEP had accredited 11 one-year programs that prepared holders of PhDs in physics, engineering or computer science to enter medical physics residencies.
