= Southwest University of Visual Arts =

Art school in Tucson, Arizona, US (1983–2020)

- Other names: SUVA
- Type: Private art school
- Active: 1983; 43 years ago – November 30, 2020; 5 years ago
- Location: Tucson, Arizona

Southwest University of Visual Arts (SUVA) was a private art school in Tucson, Arizona, with a branch in Albuquerque, New Mexico.

Founded in 1983, SUVA was formerly known as The Art Center Design College, but changed its name in 2011. It was accredited by the North Central Association of Colleges and Schools.

Southwest University of Visual Arts officially closed on November 30, 2020, and ceased operations on December 18, 2020. It resigned its accreditation status effective December 23, 2020.
