= Daymar College =

Defunct private university near Clarksville, Tennessee

Coordinates: 37°44′15.58″N 87°8′36.35″W

- Type: For-profit
- Active: 1963; 63 years ago–2018
- Location: Nashville, Tennessee, U.S.
- Website: www.daymarcollege.edu
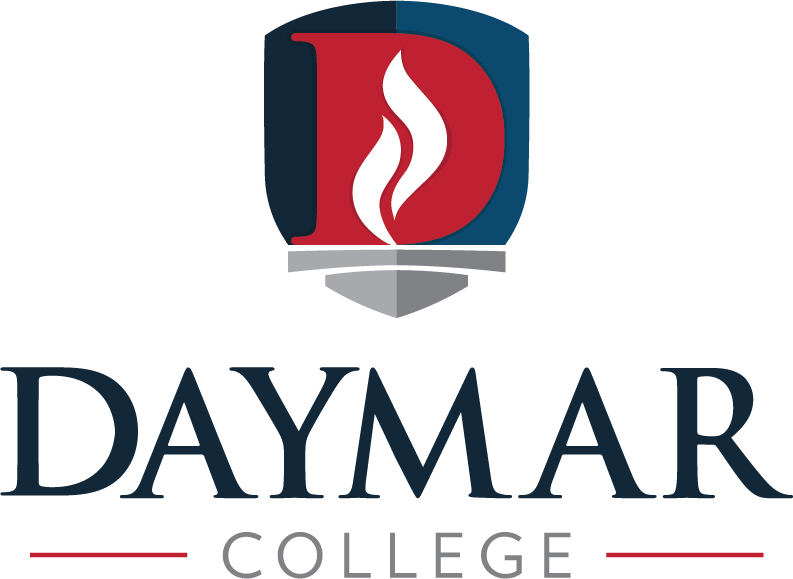

Daymar College was a for-profit college based in Nashville, Tennessee, United States. Founded in 1963 and operated as Owensboro Business College until 2001, Daymar College offered more than 35 career tracks in 22 different academic programs. Daymar College was accredited by the Accrediting Commission of Career Schools and Colleges (ACCSC).

== History ==
Daymar College opened its doors as Owensboro Business College in 1963, with a focus on general business studies. In 1970, Daymar College obtained national accreditation from the Accrediting Commission of the Association of Independent Colleges and Schools.

Brothers Mark and Damien Gabis purchased Owensboro Business College in 1995, and subsequently changed the name to Daymar College in 2001. Daymar is a combination of the brother's first names. The name change accompanied the opening of locations outside of Owensboro. The Louisville campus opened in October 2001.

In June 1999, Daymar College outgrew its old building and moved into a free-standing, one-story structure. Located on 6.4 acres (26,000 m^{2}) of land in the Heritage Park Development of Owensboro, Kentucky, the facility comprises 17,000 square feet (1,600 m^{2}) of space.

By 2000, Daymar College was chosen as a Microsoft Authorized Academic Training Program (AATP) member, and became a Prometric Testing Center and a Microsoft Office Specialist test site.

In 2016, while under investigation by the Kentucky Attorney General for fraud, plagued by declining enrollment, Daymar stopped accepting new student enrollments on two of its campuses, and announced that those campuses will close in 2018.

In 2018, Daymar College was acquired and became a branch campus of Hussian College.

== Tennessee history ==
Originally called Draughons Practical Business College, changing its name in 2010 to Daymar Institute and finally to Daymar College in 2015, was founded in 1879 by Professor John F. Draughon of Adams, Tennessee. The first permanent school was established in Nashville, Tennessee around the beginning of the 1900s. The school prospered, and by the time of Draughon's death in 1921, it was a chain of business colleges stretching across the south and western parts of the United States. In 1954, Daymar College had earned accreditation by the Accrediting Commission for Business Schools (ACBSP). However, Daymar is no longer listed on the accreditation rolls for the ACBSP.

Starting in 1978, Daymar College was an accredited junior college of business. After more than 100 years in business, Daymar College built a new facility on Plus Park Boulevard in 1980. During the summer of 1987, Daymar College expanded with a branch campus in Clarksville, Tennessee. In 2021, the Clarksville campus became part of Hussian College. Daymar College expanded to a second branch campus during the summer of 2003 in Murfreesboro, Tennessee.

== Campuses ==
In 2001 Daymar opened a branch campus in Louisville, Kentucky, and in 2008 an Online Campus was created for distance learners. Daymar College maintains 5 campuses in Kentucky, Ohio and Tennessee. Daymar campuses are a branch campus of Hussian College.

== Curriculum ==
Daymar College offered both one- and two-year programs, as well as bachelor's degree programs in a variety of professional fields.

== Legal trouble ==
In 2011, Kentucky Attorney General Jack Conway filed suit in Daviess County against the former owners and operators of Daymar College, charging that the college violated Kentucky's Consumer Protection Act. In March 2012, the case was remanded to the Daviess Circuit Court. After a protracted legal battle, Daymar elected to settle the lawsuit, refunding more than $1.2 million in student fees, and agreeing to stop trying to collect $11 million in student debt to the institution.

In 2017, Daymar College defaulted on their lease for classroom and office space with a Kentucky landlord at their Bellevue campus location. They have failed to pay rent and electric costs despite remaining in the space until abandoning it, leaving behind sensitive student information, financial documents, and medical equipment such as syringes and needles. A lawsuit was filed in Campbell County courts, which is ongoing. Daymar is in the process of attempting to sell assets to Hussian College.
