= Pulmonary scientist =

A pulmonary scientist is a health care occupation in the field of diagnostic studies related specifically to pulmonary function, the term respiratory scientist may also refer to a pulmonologist who holds a medical degree and a doctoral degree (MD-PhD). Internationally pulmonary scientists have many different titles, such as: pulmonary function technologist, respiratory scientist, pulmonary scientist, cardiopulmonary specialist and in some places registered respiratory therapists are also used in the role of pulmonary scientists. A physician in respiratory science is generally referred to as a physician in their title (i.e. Respiratory Physician-Scientist).

Respiratory science is a diminishing field of study and research even though the increase in respiratory related disease is increasing.

== International Pulmonary Science ==
=== Australia ===
In Australia there is no register or licensure for Respiratory Care; there is, however, the Certified Respiratory Function Scientist (CRFS) credential. Australian respiratory therapy is done by physiotherapists who have further specialized in cardiopulmonary therapeutics and the scope not covered by physiotherapists are managed by specialized respiratory nurses. The term Respiratory Scientist is used to describe the profession which is limited to pulmonary function testing. Though there is no official credentialing required, university degrees are required to practice.

==== Respiratory Function Scientist ====
Certified Respiratory Function Scientist (CRFS)

The Respiratory Scientist is involved in all aspects of respiratory function assessment including patient testing, interpretation of test results, maintenance of equipment, development and evaluation of new methods and quality assurance. The Respiratory Scientist may work unsupervised in core areas and provide training to trainee scientists in these areas under the direction of a senior Respiratory Scientist. Minimum education requirements for the CRFS credential is a BSc in Respiratory Physiology and Science but more likely a Masters or PhD in Respiratory Science. Australian credentialing is maintained by the Australian & New Zealand Society of Respiratory Science. Additionally, Respiratory Scientists in Australia act as consult clinicians for pharmacists in rural areas to improve respiratory function testing access.

=== Ireland ===
==== Respiratory Scientist ====
In Ireland respiratory care practitioners are called Respiratory Scientists. Their role is primarily that of the RRT-Sleep Disorders Specialist and the Registered Pulmonary Function Technologist. The representative body is the Irish Association of Respiratory Scientists.

=== United States ===
==== Pulmonary Function Technologist ====
Registered Pulmonary Function Technologist (RPFT)

The registered pulmonary function technologist in the United States is an advanced credential awarded by the National Board for Respiratory Care. Primarily the RPFT performs the technical function of pulmonary function testing.

Certified Pulmonary Function Technologist (CPFT)

The certified pulmonary function technologist in the United States is an entry-level credential awarded by the National Board for Respiratory Care. Much like the registered technologist/technician the CPFT performs pulmonary function testing.
