= Ohio Business College =

Private junior college in Ohio, US

Coordinates: 41°25′25.7″N 82°04′24.8″W

- Type: Vocational, For-profit
- Established: 1903
- Undergraduates: Diplomas, certificates, and degrees
- Location: Sheffield Village, Sandusky, and Middletown, Ohio, United States
- Nickname: OBC
- Website: www.ohiobusinesscollege.edu

Ohio Business College is a private for-profit junior college with multiple locations in Ohio. It is owned by Tri-State Educational Systems, Inc. with corporate headquarters located in Middletown, Ohio. Currently, Ohio Business College operates three campuses in Ohio with career education focused around information technology, business administration, allied health, and CDL training.

== History ==
Ohio Business College was founded in 1903 as Lorain Business College, a private, co-educational college focused on higher adult education. The college was located in downtown Lorain, Ohio. From 1913 to 1980 the school was operated under the management of C. L. Bair. Programs offered included Junior accounting, secretarial, comptometer, stenographic, and keypunch.

In 1980, the Julia Corporation purchased Lorain Business College, and the Lorain campus moved to North Ridge Road in Lorain, Ohio. Curriculum at the time consisted of executive secretarial, business administration, accounting, secretarial, and junior accounting.

On September 27, 1982, Ohio Business College opened a satellite campus in Sandusky, Ohio. The school was located in the Sandusky Plaza, but later moved to the San Marco Plaza off of State Route 250 in Sandusky. In 1993, the Julia Corporation changed the name of both campuses from Lorain Business College to Southeastern Business College to better fit with the schools owned in the southern part of the state.

In October 1997, Tri-State Educational Systems Inc. purchased the colleges from the Julia Corporation and officially changed the name to Ohio Business College in April 1998. In order to accommodate student growth, Tri-State Educational Systems, Inc. relocated both campuses to newly constructed buildings in Sandusky and Sheffield Village, Ohio.

In September 2010, Tri-State Educational Systems, Inc. dissolves Tri-State Semi Driver Training, Inc. and introduces Ohio Business College Truck Driving Academy offering Class A and Class B CDL training for Ohio residents with training sites in Middletown, Ohio.

== Academics ==
Career training is offered through many programs, including business administration with concentrations in accounting, marketing & tourism and marketing & sales, medical assisting, information technology, and medical billing.

== Accreditation ==
Ohio Business College is accredited by the Commission of the Council on Occupational Education. Ohio Business College is registered with the State Board of Career Colleges and Schools. Ohio Business College holds a certificate of authorization for the Associate of Applied Business Degree programs from the Ohio Department of Higher Education. The Medical Assisting diploma program is accredited by the Commission on Accreditation of Allied Health Education Programs upon the recommendation of the Medical Assisting Education Review Board (MAERB).

Approvals and licenses for the Ohio Business College Truck Driving Academy include Ohio State Approving Agency for Training Veterans, Veteran's Widows, and Orphans; Ohio State Approving Agency for Training of Students under the Vocational Rehabilitation and Disabled Veterans; and the Ohio Department of Public Safety (license as a CDL Driver Training School).
