= Dewey University =

Private university in Carolina, Puerto Rico

- Motto: Educación que Transforma (Spanish)
- Motto in English: Education That Transforms
- Type: Private
- Established: 1992; 34 years ago
Academic affiliations
NASFAA; PRASFAA	PRACRAO; HACU
- President: Dr. Carlos A. Quiñones Alfonso
- Vice-president: Carmelo Rodríguez
- Location: Puerto Rico
- Campus: Urban Main Hato Rey Satellite Carolina Juana Díaz Manatí
- Website: www.dewey.edu

Dewey University is a private university in Puerto Rico. The university currently has four campuses: the Hato Rey Main Campus and satellite campuses in Carolina, Juana Díaz, and Manatí.

== History ==
The school was founded in 1992 as John Dewey College. After receiving authorization from the Puerto Rico Education Council in 2011 to offer graduate programs in nursing, the school was renamed to Dewey University in late 2012.

== Academics ==
Dewey offers several types of degrees, from master's degrees, bachelor's degrees, associate degrees, vocational certificates, and a university experience program for high school seniors. Subject areas include administration, agriculture, construction, education, nursing, and technology.
