= Respiratory Care Act =

Medical law and regulation

A Respiratory Care Act is a common term for a law enacted allowing for the practice of Respiratory Care in a given state, province, region or nation. The name of the law may differ slightly but typically Respiratory Care is the identifier title.

== Board of Respiratory Care ==
A board of respiratory care is typically a division of that states Department of Health, much like a Board of Nursing or Board of Medicine. Granting licenses to applicants and reviewing policy related to practice and care.

== United States Congress notable acts ==
=== Medicare Respiratory Therapy Initiative Act ===
Medicare Respiratory Therapy Initiative Act - Amends title XVIII (Medicare) of the Social Security Act to cover the services of a qualified respiratory practitioner performed under the general supervision of a physician.

- H.R. 3968: Medicare Respiratory Therapy Initiative Act of 2007 — Result: Died in committee
- S. 2704: Medicare Respiratory Therapy Initiative Act of 2008 — Result: Died in committee
- S. 343: Medicare Respiratory Therapy Initiative Act of 2009 — Result: Died in committee
- H.R. 941: Medicare Respiratory Therapy Initiative Act of 2011 — Currently in committee
