= American Association for Respiratory Care =

American professional organization

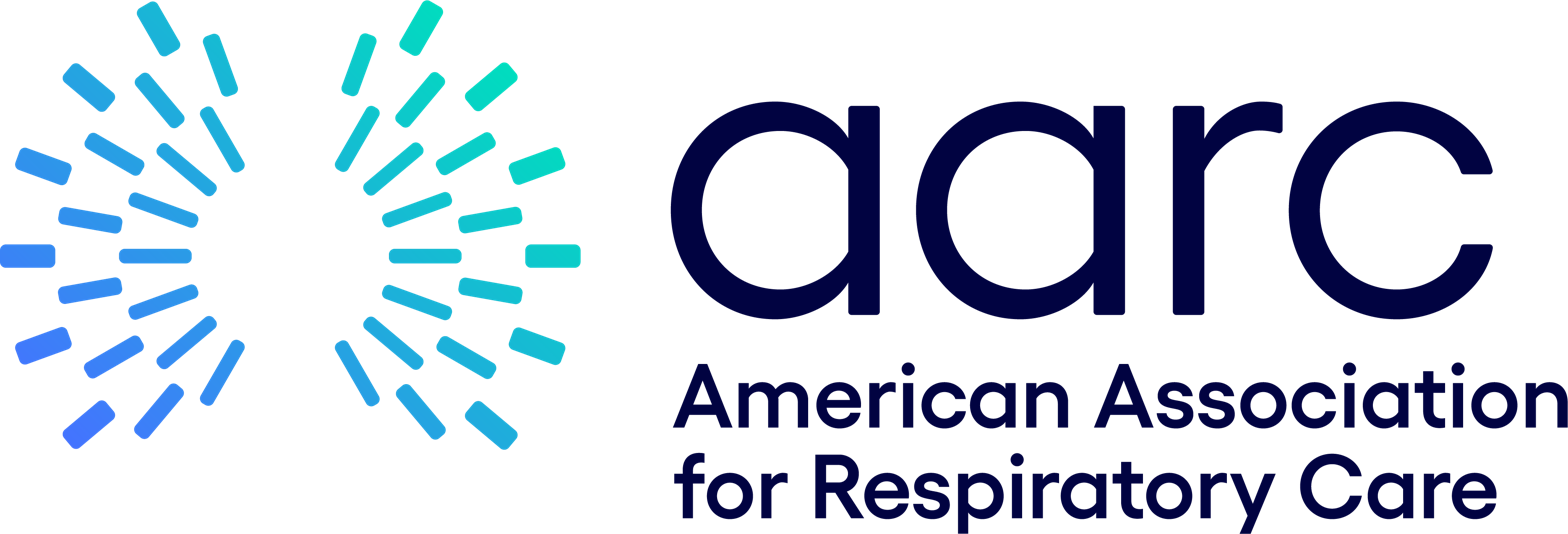
- American Association for Respiratory Care Logo
- Type: Non-profit organization
- Industry: Health care
- Predecessor: American Association for Respiratory Therapy
- Founded: April 15, 1947
- Founder: Edwin R. Levine
- Headquarters: Addison, TX, United States
- Area served: United States
- Key people: Dana Evans, President Joel Brown, President-Elect
- Website: http://www.aarc.org/

The American Association for Respiratory Care (AARC) is a nonprofit organization and is the only professional organization supporting respiratory care in the United States. In addition to attempting to help lobby for beneficial legislation nationally and locally, the AARC is trying to promote the profession as a whole to increase interest and membership. The AARC began in 1943 as the Inhalation Technician Association.

== Publications ==
- Respiratory Care
- AARC Times Magazine

=== Former titles ===
The AAIT began publishing a journal called Inhalation Therapy in 1956.

== History ==

The University of Chicago Hospital formed the Inhalation Therapy Association (ITA) in 1946. In 1947, the ITA is chartered as a non-profit entity in the state of Illinois.

The ITA was renamed American Association of Inhalation Therapists (AAIT) in 1954, and changed its name again in 1966 to American Association of Inhalation Therapy (still AAIT).

The AAIT was renamed the American Association of Respiratory Therapy (AART) in 1973 and finally took the current name of American Association of Respiratory Care in 1986.

== Affiliations ==
The AARC has several organizations with which they have an affiliation; some of these include:

- AMA Allied Health Careers
- American Academy of Allergy, Asthma & Immunology
- American Academy of Pediatrics
- American Association of Cardiovascular and Pulmonary Rehabilitation
- American Association of Critical-Care Nurses
- American College of Allergy, Asthma & Immunology
- American Heart Association
- American Hospital Association
- American Society of Anesthesiologists
- American Society for Testing and Materials
- American Thoracic Society
- Campaign for Tobacco-Free kids
- Canadian Society of Respiratory Therapists
- COARC, The Committee on Accreditation for Respiratory Care
- Council on Licensure, Enforcement, and Regulation
- Joint Commission on Accreditation of Healthcare Organizations
- Lambda Beta Society
- National Association for Medical Direction of Respiratory Care
- National Association for the Support of Long Term Care
- National Board for Respiratory Care
- National Coalition for Health Professional Education in Genetics
- National Committee for Clinical Laboratory Standards
- National Lung Health Education Program
- Neonatal Resuscitation Program
- Respiratory Therapy Society of Ontario
- Society of Critical Care Medicine

== See also ==
- European Sleep Apnea Database
- National Board for Respiratory Care
- Commission on Accreditation for Respiratory Care
