= Johnson College =

Coordinates: 41.4501°N 75.6401°W

- Former names: Johnson Technical Institute, Johnson School of Technology
- Motto: We Work.
- Type: Private technical school
- Established: 1912
- Accreditation: MSCHE
- President: Katie Pittelli
- Students: 523
- Location: Scranton, Pennsylvania, U.S.
- Colors: Blue and grey
- Mascot: Johnny the Jaguar
- Website: www.johnson.edu

Johnson College is a private technical school in Scranton, Pennsylvania. Johnson College was founded in 1912 as a trade school by Orlando S. Johnson, a wealthy coal baron, and offers associate degrees and certificates. Since 2023, Johnson College has operated a satellite campus in Hazle Township.
