= Commission on Accreditation for Respiratory Care =

American nonprofit organization

- Company type: non-profit organization
- Industry: Medicine
- Founded: May 11, 1954
- Founder: The Medical Society of the State of New York
- Headquarters: Bedford, Texas, US, United States
- Area served: United States
- Website: https://www.coarc.com/

Commission on Accreditation for Respiratory Care (CoARC) is an American nonprofit accreditation organization dedicated to respiratory care. CoARC accredits degree-granting programs in respiratory care that have undergone a rigorous process of voluntary peer review and have met or exceeded the minimum accreditation Standards as set by the professional association in cooperation with CoARC. These programs are granted accreditation status by CoARC, which provides public recognition of such achievement. In 2009, there were over 300 accredited programs in the United States.

== Collaborating organizations ==
- American Society of Anesthesiologists
- American College of Chest Physicians
- The American Thoracic Society

== See also ==
- American Association for Respiratory Care
- National Board for Respiratory Care
