= American College of Chest Physicians =

Medical association for pulmonologists

- Formation: 1935
- Headquarters: Glenview, Illinois
- Members: 19,000+
- President and Chair: David A. Schulman
- Revenue: 38,220,800
- Website: https://www.chestnet.org/

The American College of Chest Physicians (CHEST) is a medical association in the United States consisting of physicians and non-physician specialists in the field of chest medicine, which includes pulmonology, critical care medicine, and sleep medicine. The group was founded in 1935. It has a membership of over 19,000.

== See also ==
- Chest (journal)
