= San Joaquin Valley College =

Private for-profit junior college in California, US

- Type: Private for-profit
- Established: 1977
- President: Robyn Wiles
- Location: California, United States
- Subsidiary institution: Carrington College
- Website: sjvc.edu

San Joaquin Valley College (SJVC) is a private for-profit college with locations in California and an online division. SJVC was founded in 1977 by Robert and Shirley Perry. The college offers certificates, Associate of Science degrees, and continuing education opportunities in the criminal justice and industrial trade fields.

== History ==
Shirley Perry began working as a medical assistant for a local physician to contribute to her family's income while raising her two children. Struggling to find the vocational training necessary to become certified as a nurse, she purchased a study guide and other textbooks to pass the exam. She learned later she was the first person to pass the exam without classroom instruction.

Other medical assistants turned to Shirley for tutoring, which led to a teaching position at a local college. After three years, Shirley left the college and decided to start her own training program. Her husband, Robert, left his job to run the business end of the company.

The couple founded San Joaquin Valley College (SJVC) in 1977 in Visalia, California. Shirley was one of the first instructors and taught a class of three students, one of whom was a relative who did not pay tuition. All three students were pursuing certificates in medical assisting.The school was run out of a suite at a Visalia strip mall at 4706 W. Mineral King. The building was later torn down during the widening of Highway 198 in 2000.

Less than a year later, the college had already expanded its course offerings to dental assisting, surgical technology, and respiratory therapy. By 1979, SJVC was nationally accredited by the Council for Higher Education Accreditation.

=== Expansion and transfer of ownership ===
In 1982 the Bakersfield campus was opened, followed by Fresno in 1985 and Fresno Aviation in 1991. By the close of 1985, the three main campuses at Visalia, Bakersfield, and Fresno were generating revenue of close to $6 million.

The original Visalia campus moved to a new 19,000-square-foot location in 1986 at 8400 W. Mineral King. At the time, the Visalia campus served 216 students. That same year, the school offered $2,000 scholarships to 20 students for the first time.

Robert and Shirley Perry's two sons, Mark and Michael Perry, joined the staff of SJVC as janitors. Mark became the campus director in Bakersfield and Michael became the campus director in Fresno. In 1992, the sons took over the day-to-day operation of the school. Two years later, the two formally purchased the institution from their parents.

The Rancho Cucamonga campus was established in 2001.

Online classes began being offered in 2004. That same year, the Modesto campus was opened along with the Hanford extension of the Visalia campus. A campus in Rancho Cordova, near Sacramento, opened in 2005.

The school began the process of securing accreditation to grant four-year degrees in dental hygiene, nursing, respiratory therapy, and training for physician assistants in 2005.

By 2011, SJVC has established eight campuses: Bakersfield, Fresno, Fresno Aviation, Hesperia, Modesto, Rancho Cucamonga, Temecula, and Visalia. At the time, total enrollment for all divisions was 6,969 students.

In 2017, the school began offering a bachelor's degree in respiratory therapy. Prior to 2017, students could only take online classes toward a bachelor's degree through Boise State University. The first class graduated in 2019. That same year, the school offered 22 certificate programs in fields including health, business, criminal justice, and technical and industrial trades. Programs were developed to fit the schedule of part-time students, who could earn a bachelor's degree in as little as 14 months.

The school was first certified to grant degrees by the Accrediting Commission for Community and Junior Colleges of the Western Association of Schools and Colleges in 1995 and reaffirmed its accreditation in 2001. It was later accredited by WASC Senior College & University Commission (WSCUC) in 2020.

In 2018, SJVC acquired Carrington College from Adtalem Global Education. Carrington College continues to operate under its own brand.

As of 2022, the school maintained 17 campuses in 16 California towns.

In 2025, Carrington College and San Joaquin Valley College realigned their programs to fill a need for more healthcare workers in the Central Valley of California. As a result, Carrington took over all nursing and allied healthcare training for the two schools with SJVC assuming all business, trade, and technical courses.

== SkyWest partnership ==
In 2022, the school renewed a relationship with SkyWest Airlines which offered tuition and job assistance to students enrolled in the aviation maintenance program. The 17-month program enrolled about 60 students and costs between $35,000 and $42,000. The partnership includes reimbursing students for licensing and testing fees, which can exceed $3,000.

== Vocational nursing program ==
Eisenhower Health, a hospital in the Coachella Valley, formed a partnership with SJVC in 2022 to provide training for the hospital's vocational nurses. Classes take place at the school's Rancho Mirage campus. Evening classes include nursing fundamentals, anatomy, and physiology. On the weekends, students complete clinical training at Eisenhower Health or nearby skilled nursing facilities.

The vocational nursing program is offered at the college's Visalia, Santa Maria, Bakersfield, and Rancho Mirage campuses.

The SJVC program is one of 135 similar programs launched in 2022 to address a persistent nationwide shortage of nurses.

== Wage and hour lawsuits ==
SJVC is among several institutions in California sued for wage and hour violations since 2016. The suits claim that part-time professors have not been compensated for hours worked or provided with meal or rest breaks. Schools named in the suits include Stanford University, LMU, The University of San Diego, Point Loma Nazarene University and California Lutheran University, and The Art Institute of California's San Diego campus.
