= List of respiratory therapy organizations =

A list of organizations for the advancement of respiratory care.

== A ==
- Alabama Society for Respiratory Care
- Alaska Society for Respiratory Care
- Associazione Scientifica Interdisciplinare per lo Studio delle Malattie Respiratorie (AIMAR) (Italy)
- Associazione Italiana Pneumologi Ospedalieri (AIPO) (Italy)
- American Association for Respiratory Care (AARC) (United States)
- American College of Chest Physicians (ACCP) (United States)
- American Thoracic Society (ATS) (United States)
- Asian Pacific Society of Respirology (APSR)
- Asociación Argentina de Medicina Respiratoria (Argentina)
- Associación Latin Americana del Tórax (ALAT)
- Austrian Society of Pneumology (ASP) (Austria)
- Association of Respiratory Care Practitioner in the Philippines Inc (ARCPP) (Philippines)
- Association of Respiratory Therapists Singapore (ARTS) (Singapore)

== B ==
- Belgian Thoracic Society
- Brazilian Thoracic Society
- British Thoracic Society
- Bulgarian Society of Respiratory Diseases

== C ==
- Canadian Society for Respiratory Therapy
- Canadian Thoracic Society
- Croatian Respiratory Society
- Colorado Society for Respiratory Care

== D ==
- Deutsche Gesellschaft für Pneumologie und Beatmungsmedizin e.V. (Germany)
- Dutch Thoracic Society (NVALT)

== E ==
- European Respiratory Society (ERS)
- Egyptian Society of Chest Diseases and Tuberculosis
- European Society of Thoracic Imaging (ESTI)
- Estonian Respiratory Society
- European Academy of Allergology and Clinical Immunology (EAACI)
- European Federation of Allergy and Airways Diseases Patients' Associations (EFA)
- European Lung Foundation (ELF) ( World Spirometry Day (WSD) )

== G ==
- Global Smoke Free Partnership (GSP)

== H ==
- Hellenic Thoracic Society (Greece)
- Hungarian Respiratory Society

== I ==
- Indian Association of Respiratory Care (IARC) (India) Official Website (External Link) Indian Association of Respiratory Care
- Indian Chest Society
- International Society for Aerosolin Medicine (ISAM)
- Irish Thoracic Society
- International Council for Respiratory Care (ICRC) Official Website (External Link)

== K ==
- Kazakhstan National Respiratory Society (Kazakhstan)
- Kyrgyz Thoracic Society

== L ==
- Latvian Society of Lung Physicians
- Lebanese Pulmonary Society

== M ==
- Malayali Association of Respiratory Care (MARC)
- Médecins sans frontières (MSF) (Doctors Without Borders)
- Moroccan Society of Allergy and Clinical Immunology

== N ==
- National Research Institute of Tuberculosis and Lung Disease (Iran)
- National Board for Respiratory Care (NBRC)

== P ==
- Pakistan Chest Society
- Pan African Thoracic Society (PATS)
- PHILIPPINE SOCIETY FOR THE ADVANCEMENT OF RESPIRATORY THERAPY
- Polish Respiratory Society
- Primary Care Respiratory Journal (PCRJ)

== R ==
- Romanian Society of Pneumology
- Russian Respiratory Society
- Respiratory Therapists Society of Republic of China, RTSROC
- Respiratory Society of Serbia (RUS)

== S ==
- Saudi Thoracic Society
- Schweizerische Gesellschaft für Pneumologie (Switzerland)
- Slovak Pneumological and Ftiseological Society
- Slovenian Respiratory Society
- Sociedad Chilena de Enfermedades Respiratorias (Chile)
- Sociedad Española de Neumología y Cirugía Torácica (Spain)
- Sociedade Portuguesa de Pneumologia (Portugal)
- Société Algérienne de Pneumophtisiologie (Algeria)
- Société de Pneumologie de Langue Française (SPLF)
- Society of Albanian Pulmonologists
- South African Thoracic Society

== T ==
- Taiwan Society of Pulmonary and Critical Care Medicine
- Taiwan Society for Respiratory Therapy, TSRT
- Texas Society for Respiratory Care
- The European Association for Cardio-Thoracic Surgery (EACTS)
- The Finnish Respiratory Society
- The Japanese Respiratory Society
- Tunisian Society of Respiratory Disease and Allergology
- Turkish Respiratory Society
- Turkish Thoracic Society
