= College of Respiratory Therapy =

A College of Respiratory Care is a type of educational institution, or part thereof, providing education and training to become a fully qualified respiratory practitioner. The nature of respiratory care education and respiratory practitioner qualifications varies considerably across the world.

In Canada, "College of Respiratory Therapy" may refer to a provincial professional association, such as the College of Respiratory Therapists of Ontario.

== Degrees granted ==
- Associate of Science in Respiratory Care
- Bachelor of Science in Respiratory Care
- Master of Science in Respiratory Medicine

== See also ==
- National Board for Respiratory Care
