= Canadian Board for Respiratory Therapy =

The Canadian Board for Respiratory Care (CBRC) was founded in 1989 as a non-profit organization which produces examinations for credentialing for practicing respiratory care. The Board also has collaborated with other organizations on matters related to respiratory therapy education.

== Affiliated groups ==
- Canadian Society of Respiratory Therapists
- College and Association of Respiratory Therapists of Alberta
- College of Respiratory Therapists of Ontario

== See also ==
- Respiratory therapist
