= Jacky Smith =

British physician and professor

Jaclyn Smith
- Education: University of Manchester
- Scientific career
- Workplaces: University of Manchester; Johns Hopkins University
- Thesis: Objective measurement of cough (2004)

Jacky Smith is a British physician who is a professor of respiratory medicine at the University of Manchester. She is interested in the mechanisms that underpin pathological cough. Smith established a regional clinical service for people with refractory chronic cough. Smith is director of the NIHR Manchester Clinical Research Facility and is a Fellow of the European Respiratory Society.

== Early life and education ==
Smith studied medicine at the University of Manchester. She trained in general medicine in the North West and completed a doctorate on the measurement of cough, which allowed her to collaborate with computer scientists and physicists. She was supported by various fellowships and awards to continue her research, including spending a year at Johns Hopkins University.

== Research and career ==
Smith is interested in cough monitoring and the mechanisms that underlie cough and respiratory disease. In 2015, she was made Director of the Manchester Clinical Research Facility, where she was awarded over £20m to develop clinical trials across Manchester.

Smith developed a new technique for cough detection. Her semi-automated method transformed how cough therapies were evaluated, and enabled the discovery of P2X3 antagonists, an anti-tussive therapy. She has developed new treatments for chronic cough, including leading the clinical trials for gefapixant and NOC-100.

== Selected publications ==
- Alyn H Morice; Eva Millqvist; Kristina Bieksiene; et al. (2 January 2020). "ERS guidelines on the diagnosis and treatment of chronic cough in adults and children". European Respiratory Journal. 55 (1). doi:10.1183/13993003.01136-2019. ISSN 0903-1936. PMID 31515408. Wikidata Q90083730.
- A H Morice; G A Fontana; M G Belvisi; et al. (1 June 2007). "ERS guidelines on the assessment of cough". European Respiratory Journal. 29 (6): 1256–1276. doi:10.1183/09031936.00101006. ISSN 0903-1936. PMID 17540788. Wikidata Q80412003.
- Alyn H Morice; Eva Millqvist; Maria G Belvisi; et al. (19 August 2014). "Expert opinion on the cough hypersensitivity syndrome in respiratory medicine". European Respiratory Journal. 44 (5): 1132–1148. doi:10.1183/09031936.00218613. ISSN 0903-1936. PMID 25142479. Wikidata Q38241730.
