= Medical credentials =

Healthcare professional credentials are credentials awarded to many healthcare practitioners as a way to standardize the level of education and ability to provide care.

== Clinicians ==
- Physician
  - Bachelor of Medicine, Bachelor of Surgery (MBBS)
  - Doctor of Medicine (M.D.)
  - Doctor of Osteopathic Medicine (D.O.)
- Dentist
  - Bachelor of Dental Surgery (BDS)
  - Doctor of Dental Medicine (DMD)
  - Doctor of Dental Surgery (DDS)
- Optometrist
  - Doctor of Optometry (OD)
- Podiatrist
  - Doctor of Podiatry (DPM)
- Chiropractor
  - Doctor of Chiropractic (DC)
- Physician Assistant (PA)
  - Doctor of Medical Science (D.Med.Sc.), (D.M.Sc.)
  - Master of Medical Science (M.Med.Sc), (M.M.Sc.)
  - Master of Physician Assistant Studies (M.P.A.S.)
  - Professional (Second-entry) Bachelor of Science in Physician Assistant (B.Sc.PA.), (B.H.Sc.PA)
- Pharmacist (R.Ph.)
  - Doctor of Pharmacy (PharmD)
  - Master of Pharmacy (MPharm)
  - Bachelor of Pharmacy (B.Pharm)

== Medical Researchers ==
- Philosophiae Doctor (Ph.D.)
- Dr. mr. (Doctor of Medical Research)

== Allied Health Professionals ==
- Respiratory practitioner (a.k.a. "respiratory therapist" or "respiratory care practitioner") (RRT, CRT)
  - Associate of Science in Respiratory Therapy (ASRT)
  - Bachelor of Science in Respiratory Therapy (BSRT)
  - Master of Science in Respiratory Therapy (MSRT)
- Paramedic (NRP)
- Emergency Medical Technician (EMT-B, EMT-I, EMT-IV, EMT-I/99, EMT-I/89, NREMT, NRAEMT)
- Athletic Trainer (ATC)
  - Bachelor of Science in Athletic Trainer (BS)
  - Masters of Athletic Training (MSAT, MAT)
- Dietician
  - Registered Dietitian (RD)
  - Registered Dietitian Nutritionist (RDN)
- Radiographer and specialties
  - Varies by country, see main article.
- Occupational therapist
  - Master of Occupational Therapy (MOT)
  - Doctor of Occupational Therapy (OTD)
- Physical therapist
  - Master of Physical Therapy (MPT)
  - Doctor of Physical Therapy (DPT)
- Speech therapist/Speech-Language Pathologist
  - Speech and Language Pathologist (SLP)
- Music therapist
  - Board Certified Music Therapist (MT-BC)
  - Master of Music Therapy (MMT)
- Surgical technologist
  - Associate of Applied Science in Surgical Technology
- Medical Laboratory Technician/Medical Laboratory Scientist/Medical Technologist (MLT, MLS, MT)
  - Associate of Science in Medical (Clinical) Laboratory Sciences (ASMLS, ASCLS, degrees, MLT Certification Eligible if from a NAACLS accredited program)
  - Bachelor of Science in Medical (Clinical) Laboratory Sciences (BSMT, BSMLS, BSCLS degrees, MLS Certification Eligible if from a NAACLS accredited program)
  - Masters of Science in Medical (Clinical) Laboratory Sciences (MSMLS, MSCLS degrees)
  - Doctor of Science in Clinical Laboratory Sciences (DSCLS degree)

== Nursing ==
- Registered nurse (RN)
  - Doctor of Nursing Practice (DNP)
  - Master of Science in Nursing (MSN)
  - Bachelor of Science in Nursing (BSN)
  - Associate of Science in Nursing (ASN)
  - Diploma in Nursing
- Practical nurse (PN, LPN, VN)
- Certified anesthesiologist assistant (CAA)

== Assistants ==
- Nurse aide (CNA)
- Nurse technician (CNT)
- Care partner (CP)
- Medical Assistants
  - Certified Medical Assistant (CMA)
  - Certified Medical Assistant - Admin (CMA-A)
  - Certified Medical Assistant - Clinical (CMA-C)
  - Certified Medical Assistant - Admin and Clinical (CMA-AC)
  - Registered Medical Assistant (RMA)
  - Medical Assistant (MA)
  - Certified Clinical Medical Assistant (CCMA)
  - Certified Medical Administrative Assistant (CMAA)
- Pharmacy Technician
  - Certified Pharmacy Technician (CPhT)

=== Therapy assistants ===
- Physical therapy assistant (PTA)
  - Associate of Applied Science in Physical Therapist Assistant
- Occupational therapy assistant
  - Associate of Applied Science in Occupational Therapy Assistant(AAS OTA) (COTA)

== Alternative Medicine ==
- Naturopaths
  - Naturopathy (ND)
