= Credentialing =

Process for qualifications of medical professionals

Credentialing is the process of establishing the qualifications of licensed medical professionals and assessing their background and legitimacy.

Credentialing is the process of granting a designation, such as a certificate or license, by assessing an individual's knowledge, skill, or performance level.

In the healthcare industry, credentialing is defined as a formal process that employs a set of guidelines to ensure that patients receive the best possible care from healthcare professionals who have undergone the most stringent scrutiny regarding their ability to practice medicine.

Many health care institutions and provider networks conduct their own credentialing, generally through a credentialing specialist or electronic service, which is reviewed by a credentialing committee. It may include granting and reviewing specific clinical privileges, and allied health staff membership.

== Insurance credentialing / provider enrollment / medical credentialing ==
Credentialing is the process the healthcare facility or managed care organization/health plan uses to collect and verify the "credentials" of the applicant. This includes verification of many elements, including licensure, education, training, experience, competency, and judgment.

Physicians and other healthcare providers who wish to provide care in a hospital, ambulatory care facility, or other healthcare facility must undergo an application process which includes verification of credentials. Additionally, providers that want to bill an insurance company and receive reimbursement for services as an in-network provider must undergo a process of credentialing. Healthcare facilities and health plans will verify relevant education including, medical school, residency/fellowship training, board certification, licensure, professional liability insurance and claims history, and will query the National Practitioner Data Bank (NPDB). The NPDB is an electronic repository containing information on medical malpractice payments and certain adverse actions related to healthcare practitioners, entities, providers, and suppliers. Although the basic aspects of credentialing are performed in the same way, different credentials are verified depending on the environment. For example, hospitals will typically request information concerning procedures performed to document that the applicant is meeting current competency requirements for the privileges requested, but health plans (insurance companies) do not typically collect this information because health plans do not grant privileges. Since healthcare facilities grant clinical privileges, these organizations will also write to contact other facilities where a provider has worked and obtain professional references to verify experience, and competency, and to determine whether any disciplinary actions were taken against the provider.

The approval process in a healthcare facility typically involves a review of the applicant's credentials and qualifications with recommendations for appointment and privileges made by the medical staff via a department chairperson, the credentials committee, and the medical executive committee. The approval process varies depending on the medical staff structure. The actual approval of privileges and appointments is made by the board of directors. Some healthcare facilities have a mandatory requirement for interviews, and some hospitals will only interview physicians under certain circumstances as defined in the medical staff's bylaws.

In a health plan, the credentialing process differs from that of a hospital. In a health plan, the provider enrolls in the provider panel network. After the application is submitted and credentials are verified, the approval process will involve review and approval by the network's medical director or credentialing committee.

Typically, insurance companies require credentialing for the following providers

- Physicians: Medical Doctors (MD) and in the US (Doctors of Osteopathic medicine. DO)
- Consultant and specialist Physicians*
- Medical institutions
- Clinics
- Hospitals
- Dentists
- Physical therapists,
- Speech therapists
- Psychologists
- Occupational therapists
- Licensed marriage and family therapists (LMFT)
- Durable Medical Equipment (DME) suppliers
- Home health nurses & agencies

Provider credentialing is different from provider enrollment. Provider enrollment is the process of enrolling a provider with insurance payers. The provider must submit a credentialing application that details their training and qualifications to treat patients in their area of specialty. While hospitals and health systems typically have their own provider enrollment team to perform this function, independent group practices and solo practitioners may contract with another organization to perform this function.

== Special circumstances: telemedicine ==
The Center for Medicare and Medicaid Services (CMS) Conditions of Participation (CoPs) allow an originating site facility to use proxy credentialing when telemedicine services are provided by a practitioner affiliated with and credentialed by either a Medicare-participating distant site hospital or an entity that qualifies as a distant site telemedicine entity; and when there is a written agreement that satisfies certain requirements that are enumerated in the regulations. This allows the parties to share information regarding credentialing decisions, as well as periodic updates of practitioner reviews and assessments. While healthcare accreditation organizations have largely aligned their standards with CMS regulations, each state has its own regulations regarding hospital licensure, and many states’ regulations include regulations governing the structure and/or operation of the medical staff, including credentialing requirements.

A healthcare facility may choose to use credentialing by proxy under the CMS regulations for telemedicine providers, or it may use the process specified in the medical staff bylaws and policies and procedures for other medical staff appointees.

== The joint commission for medical credentialing ==
TJC (formerly known as JCAHO) was founded in 1951 and accredits and certifies healthcare organizations to meet quality standards. It envisions a future in which TJC is "leading the way to zero," which translates to zero harm in healthcare.

TJC, or the Joint Commission, accredits and certifies over 22,000 healthcare organizations and services in the United States. TJC accreditation establishes a baseline for patient safety and process improvement. Healthcare facilities that want to supply services to Medicare, Medicaid and other Federal healthcare plans may use Joint Commission accreditation in lieu of being surveyed by the State Health Department.

== Process of credentialing ==
Credentialing requires more comprehensive data of the professional, political member or a group of professionals. The process of credentialing includes verification of the information such as:

- Education and training
- Residency
- Licenses
- Specialty certificates
- Qualifications
- Career history

== Types of credentialing ==
There are three types of Credentialing

- Personal credentialing
- Political credentialing
- Paperless credentialing

== Personnel credentialing ==
Personnel credentialing is typically undertaken at commencement of employment (initial application) and at regular intervals thereafter (reappointment). Credentialing of vendors or other organizations may begin prior to the purchasing process and be repeated regularly.

== Political credentialing ==
Political parties credential delegates at their conventions. Credentialing is required for the UN representatives in the General Assembly. A Credentials Committee consisting of nine members is appointed at the beginning of each regular session of the General Assembly. The Committee reports to the Assembly on the credentials of representatives.

== Paperless credentialing ==
Paperless credentialing is the process of doing credentialing through a software package. With the internet, many web-based programs have been created to help automate the process of paperless credentialing.

== Medical credentialing software ==
Medical credentialing software refers to specialized technology platforms designed to automate and streamline the credentialing and enrollment processes for healthcare providers and organizations. These systems have evolved significantly since the early 2000s, transitioning from basic digital record-keeping to sophisticated artificial intelligence-enabled platforms.

=== Traditional credentialing software ===
Early credentialing software focused primarily on digitizing paper-based processes, offering features such as:

Centralized storage of provider credentials and documentation Automated expiration tracking and renewal alerts Workflow management for credentialing committees Integration with primary source verification databases Document management and electronic file storage

These systems helped reduce the administrative burden of manual credentialing, which traditionally took 90–120 days to complete, by organizing information and creating standardized workflows.

=== Ai-enabled medical credentialing and billing software ===
Beginning in the late 2010s and accelerating in the 2020s, artificial intelligence and machine learning technologies have increasingly been integrated into medical credentialing and medical billing software platforms. These AI-enabled systems represent a significant advancement in healthcare administrative technology.

== Credential verification organizations ==
Some of Credentials verification Organizations in healthcare industry are as follows

- National Practitioner Data Bank
- The American Board of Medical Specialties
- American Association of Nurse Practitioners (AANP)/American Nurses Credentialing Center (ANCC)
- The Office of Inspector General (OIG) and the System for Award Management (SAM)
- Medical Board of Each US state

== See also ==
- Actuarial credentialing and exams
- Certification
- Economic credentialing
- License
- Medical credentials
- National Association Staff Services
