= Its =

ITS, its or it's may refer to:

== Language ==
- It's, an English contraction of it is or it has
- Its (pronoun), the possessive form of the pronoun it
- Itsekiri language (ISO 639 language code its), a language found in Nigeria and the Niger Delta

== Arts and entertainment ==
- Improvisational Tribal Style, a subgenre of Tribal Style belly dance
- It's (EP), by Teen Top, 2012

== Businesses ==
- Illinois Traction System, an American railroad
- Industrial Tomography Systems, a manufacturer of process visualization systems based upon the principles of tomography
- International Transportation Service, an American container terminal company

== Education ==
- Indian Theological Seminary, an interdenominational seminary in India
- Sepuluh Nopember Institute of Technology (Institut Teknologi Sepuluh Nopember), a public engineering institute in Surabaya, Indonesia
- Institute for Transport Studies, University of Leeds (ITS Leeds)
- Institute of Technological Studies, Sri Lanka
- Institute of Technology, Sligo, Ireland
- Institute of Transportation Studies, University of California Berkeley, Davis, Irvine and Los Angeles

== Organizations ==
- Identity, Tradition, Sovereignty, a former political grouping in the European Parliament
- Indian Telecommunication Service, an organised civil service of Government of India
- Indian Trade Service
- International Thespian Society, an honorary organization for high school and middle school theatre students
- International Tracing Service
- International trade secretariat
- International Typographers' Secretariat, a former international trade secretariat
- Irish Texts Society, promoting the study of literature
- Irish Thoracic Society
- Islamic Texts Society, an educational charity based in Cambridge, UK
- Islamic Thinkers Society
- Individualists Tending to the Wild (Individualistas Tendiendo a lo Salvaje), an eco-extremist terrorist group in Mexico

== Science and technology ==
=== Computing ===
- Incompatible Timesharing System, a computer operating system
- Intelligent tutoring system, an artificial intelligence system used for tutoring
- Internationalization Tag Set, a W3C recommendation for internationalizing XML
- Issue tracking system, computer software that manages product issues

=== Other science and technology ===
- Inverse transform sampling, a method for generating random numbers from various probability distribution
- Internal transcribed spacer, a section of DNA located within a set of ribosomal genes
- Interrupted time series, a time series of data known to be affected by interventions

== Vehicular and transport ==
- ITS, a ship prefix formerly used by the Italian Navy of the Republic of Italy
- Intelligent transportation system, transportation infrastructure information technology
- Interplanetary Transport System, a project by SpaceX to develop a system capable of transporting humans and cargo to Mars and other destinations in space
- Inter-State Aviation (ICAO airline code ITS), U.S. airline; see List of airline codes (I)

== Other uses ==
- Integrated Truss Structure, a component of the International Space Station

== See also ==
- International Temperature Scale of 1990 (ITS-90), a temperature calibration standard for measurements in units of kelvin and degrees Celsius
- Network 10, which launched as the Independent Television System
- IT (disambiguation) for the singular of ITs
- lTS (disambiguation)
