= College and Association of Respiratory Therapists of Alberta =

Canadian provincial statutory professional body

The College and Association of Respiratory Therapists of Alberta is a corporation with delegated provincial government authority to regulate the profession of respiratory therapy pursuant with the Health Professions Act and the Respiratory Therapists Profession Regulation.

== Affiliated groups ==
- Canadian Society of Respiratory Therapists
- Canadian Board for Respiratory Therapy
- College of Respiratory Therapists of Ontario

== See also ==
- American Association for Respiratory Care
