= Marc Humbert =

French pulmonologist

Humbert in 2023

Marc Humbert (born 18 June 1963) is a French pulmonologist and medical researcher. He is a professor of respiratory medicine at Université Paris-Saclay, dean of its Faculty of Medicine. He heads the Department of Respiratory and Intensive Care Medicine at Hôpital Bicêtre, part of the Assistance Publique – Hôpitaux de Paris (AP-HP). He is also the director of an Inserm–Université Paris-Saclay research unit devoted to pulmonary hypertension.

He was appointed a Chevalier of the Ordre des Palmes académiques in 2010. He has been a Fellow of the European Respiratory Society. He received the Descartes–Huygens Prize of the Royal Netherlands Academy of Arts and Sciences.

Humbert was president of the European Respiratory Society (ERS) for the 2021–2022 term and served as its past president. He was editor-in-chief of the European Respiratory Journal from 2013 to 2017.

== Early life and education ==
Humbert was born in Aulnay-sous-Bois, France. He studied medicine at the former Paris-Sud University, now part of Université Paris-Saclay. He completed a doctorate in immunology at Paris-Sud and undertook postdoctoral research at the National Heart and Lung Institute, Imperial College London, from 1993 to 1995.

His postdoctoral work in London focused on the immunopathology of asthma. He returned to France in 1995 and established a research programme investigating chronic respiratory and pulmonary vascular diseases.

== Career ==
Humbert became a professor of respiratory medicine at Université Paris-Sud in 1999. He has directed the French Reference Centre for Pulmonary Hypertension and the respiratory and intensive care medicine department at Hôpital Bicêtre.

In 2010, Humbert became director of Inserm Unit 999, a research unit jointly associated with Inserm and Paris-Sud that focused on pulmonary hypertension and therapeutic innovation. The unit became associated with Université Paris-Saclay and is known as the research unit Pulmonary Hypertension: Pathophysiology and Therapeutic Innovation.

In February 2023, Humbert was elected dean of the Faculty of Medicine of Université Paris-Saclay, succeeding Didier Samuel.

In 2010 he was appointed vice-president responsible for research on the AP-HP executive board and chair of its research committee.

=== European Respiratory Society ===
Humbert was editor-in-chief of the European Respiratory Review from 2009 to 2012.

He became editor-in-chief of the European Respiratory Journal in 2013 and held the position until 2017.

Humbert served as president of the European Respiratory Society for 2021–2022. He was formally appointed president at the society's General Assembly in 2021, succeeding Anita Simonds.

== Research ==
Humbert's research has focused primarily on the pathophysiology, diagnosis and treatment of pulmonary hypertension, particularly pulmonary arterial hypertension. His work has examined pulmonary vascular remodeling and the roles of inflammation and transforming growth factor beta signaling in the disease.

A national French registry published in 2006 described clinical and hemodynamic characteristics of 674 patients with pulmonary arterial hypertension recruited from 17 university hospitals.

Humbert was a member of the joint European Society of Cardiology (ESC) and ERS task force that produced the 2015 guidelines for the diagnosis and treatment of pulmonary hypertension. He was the first author of the 2022 ESC/ERS guidelines, published in the European Heart Journal in 2022.

Humbert was a lead author of a 2021 New England Journal of Medicine clinical trial evaluating sotatercept for pulmonary arterial hypertension. He was also the lead author of a 2025 phase 3 study of sotatercept in patients with pulmonary arterial hypertension at high risk of death.

== Awards and honours ==
- 1996 Young Allergist Award
- 1997 François Brenot Award, European Respiratory Society
- 2006 Cournand Lecturer Award, European Respiratory Society
- 2009 Descartes–Huygens Prize, Royal Netherlands Academy of Arts and Sciences
- 2010 Chevalier of the Ordre des Palmes académiques
- 2013 Honorary doctorate, Carol Davila University of Medicine and Pharmacy, Bucharest
- 2014 Fellow of the European Respiratory Society
- 2016 Éliane and Gérard Pauthier Award for rare disease research
- 2018 ERS Award for Lifetime Achievement in Pulmonary Arterial Hypertension
- 2019 Excellence Award, Fondation du Souffle
- 2020 Distinguished Achievement Award, American Heart Association Council on Cardiopulmonary, Critical Care, Perioperative and Resuscitation
- 2024 ERS Congress Chair Award
- 2025 Grand Prix of the Fondation de l'Assistance Publique – Hôpitaux de Paris
- 2025 Inserm Grand Prix

In 2018, Humbert was included in Clarivate Analytics' Highly Cited Researchers list in clinical medicine.

== Selected publications ==
- Humbert, Marc; Sitbon, Olivier; Simonneau, Gérald. "Treatment of pulmonary arterial hypertension". New England Journal of Medicine. 2004;351(14):1425–1436. doi:10.1056/NEJMra040291.
- Humbert, Marc; et al. "Pulmonary arterial hypertension in France: results from a national registry". American Journal of Respiratory and Critical Care Medicine. 2006;173(9):1023–1030. doi:10.1164/rccm.200510-1668OC.
- Humbert, Marc; et al. "Survival in patients with idiopathic, familial, and anorexigen-associated pulmonary arterial hypertension in the modern management era". Circulation. 2010;122(2):156–163. doi:10.1161/CIRCULATIONAHA.109.911818.
- Humbert, Marc; et al. "Sotatercept for the Treatment of Pulmonary Arterial Hypertension". New England Journal of Medicine. 2021;384(13):1204–1215. doi:10.1056/NEJMoa2024277.
- Humbert, Marc; et al. "2022 ESC/ERS Guidelines for the diagnosis and treatment of pulmonary hypertension". European Heart Journal. 2022;43(38):3618–3731. doi:10.1093/eurheartj/ehac237.
- Humbert, Marc; et al. "Sotatercept in Patients with Pulmonary Arterial Hypertension at High Risk for Death". New England Journal of Medicine. 2025;392(20):1987–2000. doi:10.1056/NEJMoa2415160.
