= DZK =

DZK may refer to:

- DZK, the code for Durgachak railway station in India
- Daikin Zoning Kit, a building air-handling component manufactured by Daikin
- DZK, ticker symbol for MSCI Developed Markets, an exchange-traded fund provided by Direxion until 2020
- DZK, acronym for Deutsches Zentralkomitee zur Bekämpfung der Tuberkulose ("German Central Committee against Tuberculosis"), a cooperative partner of the German Respiratory Society
