= European Sleep Apnea Database =

- Logo from website
- Formation: 2006
- Type: Collaborative database
- Legal status: Active
- Purpose: Compile information about sleep apnea
- Fields: Medicine, Internal medicine, Sleep medicine, Sleep apnea
- Key people: Jan Hedner
- Affiliations: European Cooperation in Science and Technology; Sahlgrenska Academy at University of Gothenburg
- Website: Official website

The European Sleep Apnea Database (ESADA) (also referred to with spelling European Sleep Apnoea Database and European Sleep Apnoea Cohort) is a collaboration between European sleep centres as part of the European Cooperation in Science and Technology (COST) Action B 26. The main contractor of the project is the Sahlgrenska Academy at University of Gothenburg, Institute of Medicine, Department of Internal Medicine, and the co-ordinator is Jan Hedner, Professor of Sleep Medicine.

The book Clinical Genomics: Practical Applications for Adult Patient Care said ESADA was an example initiatives which afford an "excellent opportunity" for future collaborative research into genetic aspects of obstructive sleep apnea syndrome (OSAS). Both the European Respiratory Society and the European Sleep Research Society have noted the impact for research cooperative efforts of the database resource.

== History ==
=== 2006 – 2010 ===
In 2006 the European Sleep Apnea Database (ESADA) began as an initiative between 27 European sleep study facilities to combine information and compile it into one shared resource. It was formed as part of the European Cooperation in Science and Technology (COST) Action B 26. In addition to financial help from COST, the initiative received assistance from companies Philips Respironics and ResMed. The database storing the association's resource information is located in Gothenburg, Sweden. The group's goal was twofold: to serve as a reference guide to those researching sleep disorders, and to compile information about how different caregivers treat patients with sleep apnea.

5,103 patients were tracked from March 2007 to August 2009. Data collected on these patients included symptoms experienced, medication, medical history, and sleep data, all inputted into an online format for further analysis. Database researchers reported on their methodology and results in 2010 to the American Thoracic Society, on their observed findings regarding percentages of metabolic and cardiovascular changes related to patients with obstructive sleep apnea. The 2010 research resulted from collaboration between 22 study centres across 16 countries in Europe involving 27 researchers. The primary participants who presented to the American Thoracic Society included researchers from: Sahlgrenska University Hospital, Gothenburg, Sweden; Technion – Israel Institute of Technology, Haifa, Israel; National TB & Lung Diseases Research Institute, Warsaw, Poland; CNR Institute of Biomedicine and Molecular, Palermo, Italy; Instituto Auxologico Italiano, Ospedale San Luca, Milan, Italy; and St. Vincent University Hospital, Dublin, Ireland. Their analysis was published in 2010 in the American Journal of Respiratory and Critical Care Medicine.

=== 2011 – present ===
In 2011 there were 22 sleep disorder centres in Europe involved in the collaboration. The group published research in 2011 analyzing the percentage of patients with sleep apnea that have obesity. By 2012 the database maintained information on over 12,500 patients in Europe; it also contained DNA samples of 2,600 individuals. ESADA was represented in 2012 at the 21st annual meeting of the European Sleep Research Society in Paris, France, and was one of four European Sleep Research Networks that held a session at the event. Pierre Escourrou and Fadia Jilwan wrote a 2012 article for the European Respiratory Journal after studying data from ESADA involving 8,228 total patients from 23 different facilities. They analyzed whether polysomnography was a good measure for hypopnea and sleep apnea. Researchers from the department of pulmonary diseases at Turku University Hospital in Turku, Finland compared variations between sleep centres in the ESADA database and published their findings in the European Respiratory Journal. They looked at the traits of 5,103 patients from 22 centres. They reported on the average age of patients in the database, and the prevalence by region of performing sleep study with cardiorespiratory polygraphy.

The database added a centre in Hamburg, Germany in 2013 managed by physician Holger Hein. The group's annual meeting in 2013 was held in Edinburgh, United Kingdom and was run by Renata Riha. By March 2013, there were approximately 13,000 total patients being studied in the program, with about 200 additional patients being added into the database each month. Analysis published by researchers from Italy and Sweden in September 2013 in the European Respiratory Journal analyzed if there was a correlation between renal function problems and obstructive sleep apnea. They analyzed data from 17 countries in Europe representing 24 sleep centres and 8,112 total patients. They tested whether patients of different types of demographics with other existing health problems had a change in probability of kidney function problems, if they concurrently had obstructive sleep apnea.

In 2014, researchers released data studying 5,294 patients from the database compared prevalence of sleep apnea with increased blood sugar. Their results were published in the European Respiratory Journal. They studied glycated hemoglobin levels in the patients and compared them with measured severity in sleep apnea. The researchers analyzed glycated hemoglobin levels among a class of individuals with less severe sleep apnea and those with a higher determined amount of sleep apnea problems. As of 20 March 2014 the database included information on a total of 15,956 patients. A 2014 article in the European Respiratory Journal drawing from the ESADA analyzed whether lack of adequate oxygen during a night's sleep was an indicator for high blood pressure.

== Reception ==
In the 2013 book Clinical Genomics: Practical Applications for Adult Patient Care, ESADA is said to be an example of the kind of initiative which affords an "excellent opportunity" for future collaborative research into genetic aspects of obstructive sleep apnea syndrome (OSAS). Both the European Respiratory Society and the European Sleep Research Society have noted the impact for research cooperative efforts of the database resource.

== See also ==
- Catathrenia
- Deviated septum
- Narcolepsy
- Obesity hypoventilation syndrome
- Congenital central hypoventilation syndrome
- Sleep medicine
- Sleep sex
- Snoring
