= CRTT =

CRTT may refer to:

- Certified Respiratory Therapist
- Creation theory
- Computational/Representational Theory of Thought
