= Sleep disorder specialist =

- Significant tests: polysomnography
- Specialist: Registered Respiratory Therapist

A Sleep disorder specialist (SDS) is a Registered Respiratory Therapist (RRT-SDS) that has successfully passed the certification examination NBRC-SDS. The respiratory therapist may also be a Certified Respiratory Therapist (CRT-SDS) under certain conditions. The sleep disorder specialist scores and performs polysomnography and also assists in diagnosing and preparing a treatment plan for the condition. Some of the conditions the sleep disorder specialist helps evaluate and treat are; insomnia, sleep apnea, restless legs syndrome, and narcolepsy.

== See also ==
- Respiratory therapy
- Certified Respiratory Therapist
- American Association of Sleep Technologists
