= Certified pulmonary function technician =

In the United States, Certified Pulmonary Function Technician (CPFT) is a medical technician who is at least a Certified Respiratory Therapist and at most a Registered Respiratory Therapist that has successfully passed the national certification exam. A pulmonary function technician assists a Registered Pulmonary Function Technician with performing function tests on patients. Tests are done both inpatient and outpatient and in specialty clinics such as asthma clinics and sleep centers.

== See also ==
- Respiratory therapy
