= FIR =

A fir is a type of evergreen coniferous tree.

Fir, FIR or F.I.R. may also refer to:

== Entertainment ==
- F.I.R., a Taiwanese pop music group
- F.I.R. (album)
- F. I. R. (1999 film), an Indian Malayalam-language action film
- F.I.R No. 339/07/06, a 2021 Indian Bengali-language crime thriller film
- FIR (2022 film), an Indian Tamil-language action thriller film
- F.I.R. (TV series), an Indian sitcom
- Falling in Reverse, an American rock band

== Science and technology ==
- Far infrared
- Finite impulse response, a type of filter in signal processing
- Free ideal ring
- Flight information region
- FiR 1, the first nuclear reactor in Finland
- Research Institute for Operations Management (German: Forschungsinstitut für Rationalisierung), in Germany

== Other uses ==
- Fir, an alternative spelling of Fier, a city in Albania
- Firan language (ISO 639-3 language code: fir)
- First information report, a police document in some countries
- Flats Industrial Railroad, a former US company
- Flight information region, Specified region of airspace
- International Federation of Resistance Fighters – Association of Anti-Fascists (French: FIR Fédération Internationale des Résistantes – Association des Antifascistes)
- Italian Rugby Federation (Italian: Federazione Italiana Rugby)
- USCGC Fir, 2 US Coast Guard ships

== See also ==
- FIRS (disambiguation)
- The Firs (disambiguation)
