= Canadian Journal of Respiratory Therapy =

- Discipline: Respiratory therapy
- Language: English, French
- Edited by: Elizabeth Rohrs

Publication details
- History: 1996–present
- Publisher: Canadian Science Publishing on behalf of the Canadian Society of Respiratory Therapists
- Frequency: Annual volumes

Standard abbreviations
- ISO 4: Can. J. Respir. Ther.

Indexing
- ISSN: 1205-9838
- OCLC no.: 300812646

Links
- Journal homepage

The Canadian Journal of Respiratory Therapy (French: Revue canadienne de la thérapie respiratoire) is a peer-reviewed medical journal covering research on respiratory therapy and pulmonology. It was published on behalf of the Canadian Society of Respiratory Therapists by the Pulsus Group, until this company was acquired by the OMICS Publishing Group in 2016. This led the society to cancel their publishing agreement with Pulsus. No issues were produced with OMICS. The journal partnered with Canadian Science Publishing to publish issues until 2023. As of August 2023 the journal uses the Scholastica platform. The current editor-in-chief is Elizabeth Rohrs (Royal Columbian Hospital). The journal is open access, indexed in PMC (PubMed Central), Scopus/Embase, Google Scholar, CINAHL, and the Directory of Open Access Journals (DOAJ).

== Past Editors-in-Chief ==
The following people have been editors-in-chief of the Canadian Journal of Respiratory Therapy:

Norman Tiffin

Jason W. Nickerson

Justin Sorge
