= FIRS =

FIRS may refer to:

- Federal Inland Revenue Service, the federal tax administrator in Nigeria
- Fédération Internationale de Roller Sports, the International Federation of Roller Sports
- FIRS (index), a share index of the Banja Luka Stock Exchange
- Forensic Investigation Research Station, a "body farm" at Colorado Mesa University
- Forum of International Respiratory Societies, a respiratory health advocacy organization
- Front of Islamic Revolution Stability, principlist political group in Iran

== See also ==
- FIR (disambiguation)
- The Firs (disambiguation)
