= Universal Logistics Standard =

Disaster management framework

The Universal Logistics Standard is a strategic framework for managing disaster response among local, state, regional and federal disaster response personnel. Its intended use is as a foundation on which local, state and federal emergency management stakeholders can build a comprehensive disaster logistics program. The Universal Logistics Standard was developed by the Regional Logistics Program under the oversight of the NY-NJ-CT-PA Regional Catastrophic Planning Team, which is funded as part of the US Department of Homeland Security's Regional Catastrophic Preparedness Grant Program to support all-hazard planning and coordination of response for catastrophic events.

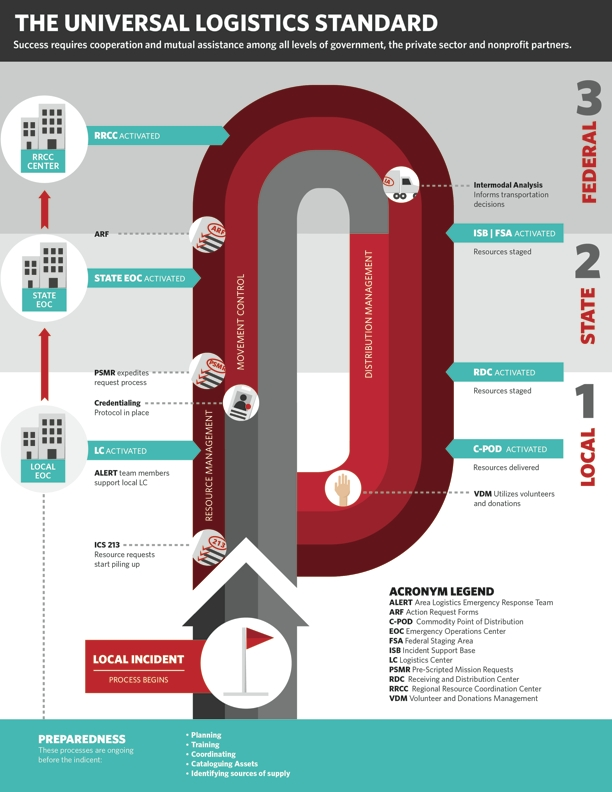
Universal Logistics Standard Diagram

== Background ==
In 2005, Hurricane Katrina devastated the U.S. Gulf Coast and posed serious logistical challenges to the governmental agencies, volunteer organizations, private sector partners and individual citizens that were active in the response and recovery operations. While the magnitude of the Hurricane Katrina disaster is widely considered a key factor for the logistics failures that ensued in its aftermath, evaluations and research on the logistical response by all levels of government identified the following key shortcomings:

- Near total failure in regional communications created problems with agency coordination and response logistics.
- Government agencies were not adequately staffed with personnel who had experience or skills in complex logistics operations.
- Near non-existent integration between state and federal logistics systems encouraged state and local response officials to abandon the established plans and procedures for requesting and managing critical supplies and resources.
- Critical supplies, resources and assets were not effectively prepositioned to support the required response.
- Planning for the handling and distribution of donations was insufficient.
- Procurement delays, due to bureaucratic requirements at all levels of government and the lack of purchasing agreements with suppliers.
- Asset visibility was almost totally obstructed throughout all points in emergency supply chains.

To address these shortcomings, in 2008 the NY-NJ-CT-PA Regional Catastrophic Planning Team received funding for the creation of the Regional Logistics Program as a competitive, high-value project awarded through the U.S. Department of Homeland Security's Regional Catastrophic Preparedness Grant Program. The investment justification submitted to the department highlighted the need to address the failures of the Hurricane Katrina response, noting the unprecedented and massive scale of operations that would be required by the nation (United States) if a catastrophe similar to Katrina were to befall the NY-NJ-CT-PA project site, which includes a population of over 22,000,000, or 1 out of 14 residents in the United States. The project described the development of a set of operational components, plans and tools to represent "the future of emergency logistics planning in the U.S."

== Strategies, Components and Tools ==
As the project has evolved and the Regional Logistics Program has made its work available for widespread use, these operational components, plans and tools have been assembled into a Universal Logistics Standard that can be specifically implemented within the NY-NJ-CT-PA project site and promoted through the United States as a standardized approach for managing emergency logistics that can be adopted by emergency management agencies at all levels of government.

It consists of plans and guides on strategies, components and tactical tools that enable disaster logisticians to plan and execute operations with common tactics. Specifically, its components and tactical tools revolve around three primary strategies:

- Resource Management
- Movement Control
- Distribution Management

To date, four components are available to emergency management agencies to support these strategies:

- Logistics Centers, which supplement emergency management agencies with an operation to receive resource requests and conduct resource management or movement control strategies specifically needed for an incident response.
- Area Logistics Emergency Response Teams, which provide emergency management agencies with trained logisticians to support complex logistics operations needed for an incident response.
- Receiving and Distribution Centers, which are just-in-time operations that function to manage incoming shipments of critical commodities, supplies and resources as they arrive into an impacted area and are assigned to meet specific operational needs during a response.
- Commodity Point of Distributions, which are independent operations to distribute food, water and critical supplies to the general public.

A number of tactical tools have been designed to assist with implementation of the Universal Logistics Standard in areas such as volunteer and donation management, credentialing, pre-scripted mission requests, logistics information management and database systems, field movement visibility and private sector integration.
