= Maria Belvisi =

British pharmacologist

Maria Gabriela Belvisi
- Education: King's College London; Imperial College London
- Scientific career
- Workplaces: Imperial College London; Ailux
- Thesis: Excitatory non-adrenergic non-cholinergic nerves and their modulation in the guinea-pig airways (1990)

Maria Belvisi is a British pharmacologist who is a professor at Imperial College London and the chief scientific officer of Ailux, an AI-biotech company wholly owned by XtalPi. Prior to joining Ailux in 2026, she worked as a senior vice president at AstraZeneca. She works on treatments for chronic cough, asthma and chronic obstructive pulmonary disease. She was elected Fellow of the Academy of Medical Sciences in 2019.

== Early life and education ==
Belvisi attended a state school in Liverpool. At the time, very few girls studied science to an advanced level. She went to King's College London to study pharmacology. She moved to the National Heart and Lung Institute for her doctoral research, where she worked with Peter Barnes.

== Research and career ==
Belvisi was appointed a Wellcome Trust Career Development Fellow at Imperial. After the four-year post, she moved to Sanofi, where she learned the basics of drug discovery. She worked on two products that looked to eliminate asthma and chronic obstructive pulmonary disease. Belvisi left Sanofi and returned to Imperial College London, where she worked alongside Magdi Yacoub. She started to build her own academic group, and was one of Imperial's youngest women professors.

Belvisi explored new treatment strategies for chronic cough and was eventually offered a position in AstraZeneca. At AstraZeneca, she served as Senior Vice President of Respiratory &Immunology Research and Development, leading a global team of approximately 500 scientists across the UK, Sweden, the US and Spain. She was responsible for R&I drug discovery and development from target identification through clinical trial investment decisions, including the development of tozorakimab from preclinical research to the Phase 3 investment decision. The programme subsequently met its primary endpoints in the Phase 3 trials in chronic obstructive pulmonary disease (COPD), representing the first successful Phase 3 programme for an IL-33-targeting therapy in COPD. During her time in AstraZeneca, she continued to partner with Imperial College, particularly to investigate respiratory disease. In 2019, she was elected Fellow of the Academy of Medical Sciences.

On 10 April 2026, Belvisi joined the biotech company Ailux as their chief scientific officer.

== Selected publications ==
- A H Morice; G A Fontana; M G Belvisi; et al. (1 June 2007). "ERS guidelines on the assessment of cough". European Respiratory Journal. 29 (6): 1256–1276. doi:10.1183/09031936.00101006. ISSN 0903-1936. PMID 17540788. Wikidata Q80412003.
- Claire Mesnil; Stéfanie Raulier; Geneviève Paulissen; et al. (22 August 2016). "Lung-resident eosinophils represent a distinct regulatory eosinophil subset". Journal of Clinical Investigation. 126 (9): 3279–3295. doi:10.1172/jci85664. ISSN 0021-9738. PMC 5004964. PMID 27548519. Wikidata Q37217521.
- M. G. Belvisi; C. D. Stretton; M. Yacoub; P. J. Barnes (1 January 1992). "Nitric oxide is the endogenous neurotransmitter of bronchodilator nerves in humans". European Journal of Pharmacology. 210 (2): 221–222. doi:10.1016/0014-2999(92)90676-u. ISSN 0014-2999. PMID 1350993. Wikidata Q34243014.
