= Master of Science in Respiratory Care =

The Master of Science in Respiratory Care (MSRC) is an advanced level postgraduate degree for respiratory therapists. Few colleges and Universities currently offer this degree though an emphasis on its importance to respiratory care and research in pulmonary medicine is growing by both nursing groups and medical colleges.

== Colleges of Respiratory Care ==
- Northeastern University (Boston, MA) (Online) - Master of Science in Respiratory Care Leadership
  - Concentrations in Adult and Organizational Learning, Clinical Trial Design, Health Management, and Respiratory Specialty Practice
- Georgia State University (Atlanta, GA) - Master of Science in Health Sciences, with a concentration in respiratory care.
- Loma Linda University (Loma Linda, CA) (Online) - Master of Science in Respiratory Care
  - Accredited by WASC Senior College and University Commission (WSCUC)
- Rush University (Chicago, IL) - Master of Science in Respiratory Care
- University of Texas Health Science Center at San Antonio (San Antonio, TX) (Online)- Master of Science in Respiratory Care
  - Accredited by the Commission on Accreditation for Respiratory Care (CoARC)
- University of Cincinnati (Cincinnati, OH) (Online) - Master of Science in Respiratory Care
  - Concentrations in Health Informatics, Health Care Administration, or Higher Education
  - Accredited by the Higher Learning Commission
- University of North Carolina at Charlotte (Charlotte, NC) (Online) - Master of Science in Respiratory Care
  - Provisional accreditation by CoARC
- Boise State University (Boise, Idaho) (Online) - Master of Science in Respiratory Care
  - Accredited by the CoARC
- Texas State University (San Marcos, TX) (Online or Hybrid) - Master of Science in Respiratory Care
  - Concentrations in Leadership and Polysommongraphy (Hybrid format only)
  - Accredited through the Southern Association of Colleges and Schools.
    - Currently seeking accreditation through CoARC
- Bellarmine University (Louisville, KY) - Master of Health Science in Respiratory Care
  - Provisional accreditation by CoARC
- Ohio State University (Columbus, OH) - Master of Respiratory Therapy
  - Provisional accreditation by CoARC
- Weber State University (Ogden, UT) - Master of Science in Respiratory Therapy
  - Concentrations in Health Administration Services, Education, Research
- Canisius (Buffalo, NY) (Online) - Master of Science in Respiratory Care
  - Concentrations in Respiratory Therapeutics or Respiratory Care Education
- Youngstown State University (Youngstown, OH) - Master of Respiratory Care
- University of Missouri (Columbia, MO) (Online) - Master of Health Science in Clinical and Diagnostic Science, with an emphasis in respiratory therapy
  - Accredited by the Higher Learning Commission
- University of Mary (Bismarck, ND) - Master of Science in Respiratory Therapy
