= Asociación Argentina de Medicina Respiratoria =

Argentinian professional medical organization

- Established: 1999
- Type: Professional association

Asociación Argentina de Medicina Respiratoria, the "Argentina Association for Respiratory Medicine" (AAMR) was formed in 1999 and is the professional association for Pulmonologists and respiratory therapists in Argentina. Working with the American Journal of Medicine and the American Association for Respiratory Care, the AAMR promotes and credentials respiratory clinicians of all types in Argentina.

== See also ==
- Registered Respiratory Therapist
- National Board for Respiratory Care
- American Association for Respiratory Care
- American Medical Association
