= Associazione Italiana Pneumologi Ospedalieri =

- Company type: non-profit organization
- Industry: Health care
- Founded: July 1985
- Headquarters: Milan, Italy
- Area served: Italy
- Website: http://www.aiponet.it
- Footnotes / references 04425680727

Associazione Italiana Pneumologi Ospedalieri is the professional organization for accreditation of pulmonology (pneumology) from pulmonologists to respiratory therapists in Italy.
