= XtalPi =

Chinese biotechnology company

XtalPi Holdings Limited
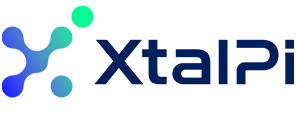
- Native name: 晶泰控股有限公司
- Formerly: QuantumPharm
- Type: Public
- Traded as: SEHK: 2228
- Industry: Biotechnology; Material science; Artificial intelligence
- Founded: 2015; 11 years ago
- Founders: Wen Shuhao; Ma Jian; Lai Lipeng
- Headquarters: Shenzhen, Guangdong, China
- Key people: Wen Shuhao (Chairman); Ma Jian (CEO); Maria Belvisi (CSO, Ailux)
- Revenue: ▲CN¥174.42 million (2023)
- Net income: ▼CN¥−1.91 billion (2023)
- Total assets: ▼CN¥4.01 billion (2023)
- Total equity: ▼CN¥−7.42 billion (2023)
- Number of employees: 783 (2023)
- Website: xtalpi.com

XtalPi Holdings Limited (XtalPi; Chinese: 晶泰科技; pinyin: Jīngtài Kējì) is a publicly listed Chinese biotechnology company that engages in research and development for early-stage drug discovery and material science through methods backed by artificial intelligence (AI).

== History ==
In 2015, XtalPi was founded in China by Wen Shuhao, Ma Jian and Lai Lipeng. The three co-founders are quantum physicists who previously worked as postdoctoral researchers at the Massachusetts Institute of Technology. The companies applied quantum algorithms to drug development. At the time it was one of the very few AI drug discovery companies in Asia which quickly drew investor interest. XtalPi claimed to be the world's most well-funded startup in the space with its investors including Tencent, 5Y Capital, Google, Susquehanna International Group, Sino Biopharmaceutical and SoftBank Vision Fund.

In 2022, after working with pharmaceutical companies like Eli Lilly, Johnson & Johnson and Merck & Co., XtalPi looked towards expanding into material science where it could apply its services. Most notably solar panels and electric vehicle batteries.

In June 2024, XtalPi helds its initial public offering and became a listed company on the Hong Kong Stock Exchange.The offering raised HK$989.3 million ($126.7 million) and on the first day of trading, the shares rose 9.8%. XtalPi was the first company to go public under the 18C rule for specialist technology companies with smaller market cap and lower revenue.

In February 2025, XtalPi announced it will raise HK$2.08 billion ($267 million) through a share placement. It also stated that one of its subsidiaries will work with Hengjian Holding to gear up the company's "AI+ Technology and Industry Integration Innovation Consortium Project" in the Greater Bay Area.

In April 2025 during CCP General Secretary Xi Jinping's visit to Shanghai, XtalPi held a meeting with him to present its commitment to scientific and technological self-reliance.

In August 2025, XtalPi announced it signed a US$6 billion deal with DoveTree, a firm established by Gregory L. Verdine.

== Business operations ==
=== Drugs ===
XtalPi uses quantum algorithms to calculate molecular structures and the resulting datasets are used for machine learning to train its own self developed AI large language models. The AI models then screen through billions of molecules and generates ones that could potentially be made into new drugs. The selected ones are later tested in XtalPi's robotic labs in China and the US.

XtalPi doesn't develop its own drugs from start to finish and instead provides its services to pharmaceutical companies to speed up their drug discovery processes. This business method allows it to focus on improving its technology, rather than taking risk in human trials. While the profitability is less than being a drug maker directly, the company's technical infrastructure continues to attract clients.

Derek Lowe has expressed skepticism on the process and stated that even if the process worked reliability, the hardest part of drug discovery are the human trials which XtalPi does not cover.

In 2016, XtalPi took part in a blind test held by Pfizer to predict the 3D structure of molecules that shows the efficacy of a drug. The program achieved a 100% prediction accuracy rate leading XtalPi to be awarded a 10-year partnership with Pfizer in early-stage drug discovery.

During the COVID-19 pandemic, XtalPi helped speed up the development of Pfizer's Paxlovid, the U.S.’s first approved Covid oral drug.

As of 2025, XtalPi serves nearly four out of every five big pharmaceutical companies globally.

=== Material science ===
XtalPi has ventured into material science as it is much more simple than drugs that involve the complexity of the human body and also has a shorter monetization cycle.

XtalPi has been helping commercialize Perovskite which is difficult to mass-produce. The material is more energy-efficient for solar panels.

In August 2024, GCL-Poly agreed to pay XtalPi more than $135 million to upgrade materials including perovskite and those for electric vehicle batteries.

== See also ==
- Insilico Medicine
