= Respiratory Care Week =

Annual observance in the US and Canada

Respiratory Care Week is a week set to honor and recognize respiratory therapists. Respiratory Care Week is celebrated internationally but most notably in Canada and the United States. Respiratory Care Week is usually the last full week of October. United States President Ronald Reagan proclaimed the first week dedicated to honoring respiratory therapists in 1982. Originally November 7 through November 13, 1982

== Previous dates ==
- 1982: November 7 — November 13
- 1983: September 15 — October 1
- 2011: October 23 — October 29

last full week of October (Sunday through Saturday)

== See also ==
- International Nurses Day
