= The Firs =

The Firs may refer to:

- Chancellors Hotel & Conference Centre (formerly named The Firs), a Grade II listed mansion in Fallowfield, Manchester, England
- The Firs, a farm near Lower Quinton, Warwickshire, England, scene of the 1945 murder of Charles Walton
- The Firs, name used by the National Trust for the Elgar Birthplace Museum, Worcestershire, England
- The Firs, Adelaide, South Australia, an historic home in Hutt Street, now known as Rymill House
- The Firs, Whitchurch, a house once referred to as "Winston Churchill's toyshop"
- The Firs Estate, a housing estate in Bromford, Birmingham, built in the 1950s
- Firs Estate School, Derby, a primary school in Derby, England
- The Firs Stadium, former speedway stadium in Norwich, England

== See also ==
- FIR (disambiguation)
- FIRS (disambiguation)
