= Wen Shuhao =

Chinese entrepreneur and scientist

- 温书豪
- Born: 1981 (age 43–44); China
- Occupation(s): Entrepreneur, scientist
- Title: Co-founder of XtalPi

Wen Shuhao (Chinese: 温书豪, born 1981) is a Chinese entrepreneur and scientist, who is the chairman and the co-founder of XtalPi.

== Education and Scholarly Activities ==
Wen is a quantum physicist with a computational physics and quantum chemistry background. He has published 36 papers which garnered more than 2,900 citations.

Wen earned his Ph.D. in physical chemistry from the Chinese Academy of Sciences and went on to pursue postdoctoral research at the University of California Riverside and the Massachusetts Institute of Technology (MIT) before he co-founded XtalPi.

Between 2018-2021, he served as a visiting professor at Zhejiang University.

In 2024, he was nominated by the MIT president to MIT's Visiting Committee for the Chemistry Department.

== Entrepreneurship ==
In 2015, during his postdoc fellowship at MIT, Wen Shuhao co-founded XtalPi in Boston with two other quantum physicists from MIT, and served as Chairman of the Board. The company combines quantum physics, AI, cloud computing, and large-scale robotics experiments to provide R&D solutions, services, and products for pharmaceuticals, biotechnology, renewable energy, and advanced materials industries globally.

In June 2024, XtalPi successfully went public on the Hong Kong Stock Exchange (HKEX) and made history as the first IPO under HKEX's new Chapter 18C listing rules for Specialized Technology Companies. XtalPi was the first "AI drug discovery" IPO and the first "AI+robotics" IPO in Greater China. Within three months of its listing, the company achieved a market capitalization of HKD 50 billion.

Wen is also an angel investor. Through incubation, investments, and collaboration with XtalPi, Wen helped launch over a dozen startups in life sciences and new materials, including METiS Pharmaceuticals, Signet Therapeutics, Leman Biotech, and META Pharmaceuticals Inc.

== Awards and honors ==
- Fortune China's list of the “40 Business Elites Under 40 (2020)”
- In 2021, Wen was awarded with “Shenzhen Patent Award”.
- In 2022, Wen was named one of the “Top 10 Outstanding Young Entrepreneurs of Shenzhen”
