= Bachelor of Science in Respiratory Care =

Four-year academic degree

The Bachelor of Science in Respiratory Care (BSRC or BScRC) is a four-year academic degree in the science and principles of respiratory care, granted by a tertiary education university or similarly accredited school.

In the United States, one is eligible to sit for the NBRC-WRE licensing examination to become a registered respiratory therapist after graduating from either a two-year program with an associate's degree, or from a four-year program with a bachelor's degree. The bachelor's degree prepares respiratory practitioners for a professional role away from the bedside with coursework in science, research, leadership, and informatics.

== Respiratory care practice ==
Students awarded a Bachelor of Science in Respiratory Care are qualified to sit for the three credentialing examinations, NBRC-ELE, NBRC-WRE, and NBRC-CSE, and apply for licensure as a registered respiratory therapist.

== See also ==
- Respiratory care
