= National Association Medical Staff Services =

US professional medical organization

- Abbreviation: NAMSS
- Formation: 1971
- Founded at: Washington, D.C.
- Type: medical and health organization
- Purpose: for medical staff professionals
- Members: 6,000+ members

The National Association Medical Staff Services (NAMSS) is an association for medical staff professionals in the United States. NAMSS was established in 1971, has over 6,000 members and is headquartered in Washington, D.C.

NAMSS followed in the footsteps of the California Association of Medical Staff Services (CAMSS) which was established in 1971. Most States have active NAMSS Affiliate Organizations.

NAMSS provides educational opportunities for its members and works to foster public awareness of the role of medical staff professionals in quality healthcare.

== Current work ==
NAMSS members are employed by hospitals, managed care organizations, ambulatory surgery centers, physician practice groups, medical insurance carriers, HMOs and many other locations. .

NAMSS publishes Synergy, a bi-monthly e-journal.

== Qualifications gained from NAMSS ==
NAMSS offers two professional certifications:

- CPCS - Certified Provider Credentialing Specialist
- CPMSM - Certified Professional Medical Services Management
