= European Cooperation in Science and Technology =

European Cooperation in Science and Technology European Cooperation in Science and Technology
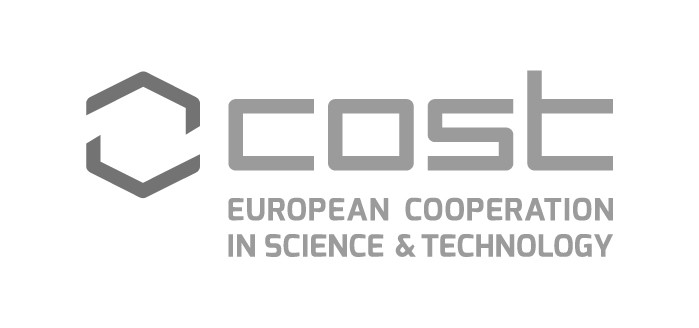
- Logo
- Type: Research
- Membership: Full Members: 41 member states; Albania; Armenia; Austria; Belgium; Bosnia and Herzegovina; Bulgaria; Croatia; Cyprus; Czech Republic; Denmark; Estonia; Finland; France; Georgia; Germany; Greece; Hungary; Iceland; Ireland; Italy; Latvia; Lithuania; Luxembourg; Malta; Moldova; Montenegro; The Netherlands; The Republic of North Macedonia; Norway; Poland; Portugal; Romania; Serbia; Slovakia; Slovenia; Spain; Sweden; Switzerland; Turkey; United Kingdom; Ukraine; Cooperating Members: 1 member state; Israel; Partner Members: 1 member state; South Africa; Near Neighbour Countries: 14 member states; Algeria; Azerbaijan; Belarus; Egypt; the Faroe Islands; Jordan; Kosovo; Lebanon; Libya; Morocco; Palestine; Russia; Syria; Tunisia

Leaders
- Ase Gornitzka
- Barbara Bottiau
- Website https://www.cost.eu/

Grant proposal for DNAqua-Net, an example COST-funded project

The European Cooperation in Science and Technology (COST Association) is running an EU-funded programme which enables researchers and innovators to set-up their own research networks in a wide range of scientific topics, called COST Actions. While COST does not fund research activities as such, it provides funding for scientific collaboration in the form of conferences, meetings, training schools and scientific exchanges.

== History ==
In the 1960s, European countries felt the need to begin framing science policies in order to bridge the gap in science and technology between Europe and the USA. As a result, COST was founded in 1971 to connect the research systems of individual European countries. The Ministerial Conference of 22 and 23 November 1971 is generally presented as the official entry into force of COST and at which the first intergovernmental agreements were signed.

== Objectives ==
The COST governing board, the Committee of Senior Officials, approved the mission that will drive COST throughout the end of Horizon Europe:

"COST provides networking opportunities for researchers and innovators in order to strengthen Europe's capacity to address scientific, technological and societal challenges."

The organisation engages about 45,000 researchers and innovators. In all, nearly half a million researchers have participated in COST over the years.

== Membership ==
COST members as of 2022

These countries govern COST via their representatives in the COST Committee of Senior Officials (CSO) – the General Assembly of the COST Association.

Once their participation is approved, researchers from Near Neighbour Countries' institutions are eligible to participate in the COST Action on the same basis as the COST Members that have signed the Memorandum of Understanding (MoU) – with the exception of the right to vote in the Management Committees or Working Groups of the Action.

International Partner Countries are non-COST Members who are not a Near-Neighbour Country i.e. any country (worldwide) that is not included in the previous lists. Once their participation is approved, researchers from International Partner Countries can participate in the Management Committee meetings as Observers, with no voting rights. Researchers connected to institutions from International Partner Countries whose participation in a COST Action has been approved are not eligible for reimbursement. Currently, South Africa is a COST Partner Country.

== COST Actions ==
Since its inception, COST has operated according to one main instrument, the COST Action.

A COST Action is a network open to researchers and innovators, collaborating in all fields of science and technology of common interest to at least seven COST Members/Cooperating Members. A huge variety of topics can be covered in COST Actions, including established research areas like history, biology, ecology, astronomy, criminal justice, but also newly emerging areas like systems biology, renewable energy, sustainable architecture or behavioural economics. Actions can adapt as science advances.

=== Funding COST Actions ===
COST provides international funding for networking, enabling researchers to set up their interdisciplinary research networks in Europe and beyond. Since 1971, COST has been receiving EU funding under the various research and innovation framework programmes, such as Horizon 2020 and Horizon Europe.

COST provides funding for a period of four years which is used for organising meetings, workshops, conferences, training schools, short-term scientific missions as well as communication and dissemination activities. This way it promotes global networking of nationally funded research.

The average COST Action support is EUR 140,000 per annum (dependent on budget availability) for participation by typically 30 COST Member Countries. The sum covers travel and meeting support.

== Governance ==
The COST Association, an international not-for-profit association under Belgian law, is located in Brussels and carries out all activities related to the Open Call. It integrates governance, management, and implementation functions into a single structure.

The decision-making body of the COST Association is the general assembly of Members, the Committee of Senior Officials (CSO). The CSO is chaired by the President of the COST Association, Ase Gornitzka, who was appointed in July 2025 and will serve as President until 21 June 2027.

Another legal body is the Executive Board (EB) which prepares all decisions to be taken by the general assembly and oversees the activities of the COST Administration - the Executive Board is chaired by the COST Vice-President. The COST Administration, based in Brussels, is currently headed by Barbara Bottiau.
