= Forum of International Respiratory Societies =

The Forum of International Respiratory Societies, based in Lausanne, Switzerland, is a respiratory health advocacy organization. The organization was established in 2001.

The forum consists of the following organizations:

- The Asociacion Latinoamericana del Thorax
- The American College of Chest Physicians
- The American Thoracic Society
- The Asian Pacific Society of Respirology
- The European Respiratory Society
- The International Union Against Tuberculosis and Lung Disease, and
- The Pan African Thoracic Society.

In 2010, the Forum dubbed the year 2010 the "Year of the Lung".
