= Economic credentialing =

Term of disapproval used by American Medical Association

Economic credentialing is a term of disapproval used by the American Medical Association (AMA). The association defines the term as "the use of economic criteria unrelated to quality of care or professional competence in determining a physician's qualifications for initial or continuing hospital medical staff membership or privileges."

Traditionally, physicians applied for hospital staff membership based on education, medical licensure and a record of quality care. Privileges are requests to perform certain procedures or use certain skills based on training and experience. For example, an obstetrician and a family practitioner might request privileges for both routine deliveries and caesarean sections. Typically an obstetrician could demonstrate enough experience and be granted those privileges. The FP might obtain both procedures or be restricted to routine deliveries only, or none at all, based on hospital policy.

As medical costs have increased and reimbursement has declined or been stagnant, both hospitals and physicians have come under increasing financial pressure. One response by physicians has been the formation of specialty hospitals or diagnostic centers with physician ownership. Some hospitals have seen this as a threat to their economic interests and have denied or revoked membership and privileges of the physician owners.
