= Irish Thoracic Society =

- Type: Professional association

The Irish Thoracic Society (ITS) is the official society for professionals involved in the care of people with chronic or acute respiratory disease in Ireland. Membership of the Society is drawn from respiratory physicians, internal medicine physicians, pediatricians, thoracic surgeons, general practitioners, junior doctors, nurses, physiotherapists, pharmacists, dietitians, pulmonary function and respiratory therapists, scientists and other healthcare providers who specialize or have an interest in respiratory disease and care throughout Ireland - North and South. It is self-governing and not affiliated with any regulatory body. It was established by a (then) junior doctor in 2008 and no demonstration/evidence of expertise is required for membership.

== See also ==
- Registered Respiratory Therapist
- Royal College of Physicians of Ireland
- Royal College of Physicians, London
- Royal College of Surgeons in Ireland
