= LTS =

LTS, lts, or LTs may refer to:

== Transport ==
- LTS Rail, later c2c, a British train operating company
- London, Tilbury & Southend line, a railway line in England
- Altus Air Force Base, Oklahoma, U.S., IATA code LTS
- Lelant Saltings railway station, Cornwall, England, station code LTS
- Lufttransport Süd, a former German airline

== Other uses ==
- Learning and Teaching Scotland, a body of the Scottish government
- Lexicon da teater svizzer, an encyclopedia of theater in Switzerland
- Leaning toothpick syndrome, a computer-programming idiom that describes a surfeit of backslashes
- Liquid tradable securities, a type of financial instruments
- Lithuanian Nationalist and Republican Union, a Lithuanian political party
- Long-term support, a product lifecycle management policy
- Low-threshold spikes, membrane depolarizations in cell biology
- Labelled transition system, a concept used in the study of computation
- Last team standing, a mode in video games
- Least trimmed squares, a statistical method
