= German Respiratory Society =

German medical professional organization

- Abbreviation: DGP
- Formation: 17 October 1910
- Legal status: non-profit society
- Purpose: Professional and scientific organization for Respiratory medical professionals (doctors and nurses) in Germany
- Members: 3,166 members (30 August 2013)
- President: Tobias Welte
- Website: Deutsche Gesellschaft für Pneumologie und Beatmungsmedizinyoung pneumology professionals

The Deutsche Gesellschaft für Pneumologie und Beatmungsmedizin (DGP, "German Respiratory Society") is the largest and oldest medical professional organization for respiratory disorders in the German-speaking world and serves as a forum for all medical practitioners and scientists in the field of respiratory medicine. Almost 28% of the more than 3,000 members are women. Pneumologie has been the official journal of the German Respiratory Society since 1981.

== Mission ==
The DGP seeks "to promote the study, research and teaching, training and continuing education, prevention, care and rehabilitation in the field of respiratory medicine, including intensive care medicine with the focus on mechanical ventilatory support". It promotes "cooperation between medical and allied professional groups" within the field, represents the interests of the field in the public domain and works closely with "other bodies and professional associations". The DGP's activities include organizing congresses for professionals in the field of respiratory medicine, issuing guidelines and statements and promoting young doctors and researchers as well as allied health professionals. Besides improving standards of medical education at the university level as well as of specialist postgraduate training, the society focuses on improving the standard of information and preventative measures in respect of all aspects of respiratory health.

=== Annual congress ===
The annual congress of the DGP is its key event and is organized by a congress president elected for this purpose and a programme commission, who plan the congress in conjunction with the scientific sections of the DGP. In recent years, more than 3,000 people have attended the annual DGP congresses (record figure: 3,500 in 2011). Since 2009 e-posters and other presentations have been available online. Apart from presentations on specialized topics and the educational postgraduate programme, the supplementary programme includes the so-called Lung Run.

=== Awards ===
The award ceremonies of two of the DGP’s partner institutions take place during the annual congress. The Deutsche Lungenstiftung e.V. ("German Lung Foundation") awards prizes for a doctoral thesis and for secondary-school creativity as well as the Wilhelm and Ingeborg Roloff Prize for media reporting on respiratory health. The Deutsche Atemwegsliga e.V. ("German Airway League") awards a research scholarship in clinical respiratory medicine. In 2009 the DGP introduced two annual research prizes, one for basic scientific research and one for clinical research, each worth €10,000, which are also awarded at the annual congress.

=== Cooperations ===
In compliance with the educational and awareness-raising mission laid down in its statutes, the Society promotes cooperation with professional and specialist organizations with similar objectives, including the Deutsche Atemwegsliga e.V. (DAL), the Deutsche Lungenstiftung e.V. (DLS), the Deutsches Zentralkomitee zur Bekämpfung der Tuberkulose e.V. (DZK, "German Central Committee against Tuberculosis") and the Bundesverband der Pneumologen ("Federal Association of Pneumologists"). The DGP is also the co-founder of initiatives such as the Deutscher Lungentag ("German Lung Day"), the Institut für Lungenforschung (ILF, "Institute for Lung Research") and the Aktionsbündnis Nichtrauchen e.V. (ABNR, the "Alliance for Non-smoking"). The DGP also successfully pushed for the creation of the Deutsches Zentrum für Lungenforschung (DZL, "German Centre for Lung Research"), an association initiated by the Federal Ministry of Education and Research (BMBF) that brings together scientists working in lung research in Germany inside and outside the universities. The DGP also organizes concerted actions to promote pulmonary research, strengthen the position of respiratory medicine in medical education and training and to lobby politicians and parties for e.g. the protection of non-smokers. The DGP maintains close relations with international organizations such as the European Respiratory Society (ERS), the Union Européenne des Médicins Spécialistes (UEMS), the American Lung Association, the American Thoracic Society, the American College of Chest Physicians, the British Thoracic Society and the International Union against Tuberculosis and Lung Diseases. The DGP participates as an organization in projects of these bodies, and individual DGP members have fulfilled and continue to fulfil important functions, for instance the publication of the European Lung White Book of the ERS (2nd edition 2013) or the ERS HERMES programme (Harmonized Education in Respiratory Medicine for European Specialists).

=== Improving education and training ===
Since its foundation, the DGP has focused on the development of pneumology as an independent medical speciality, including teaching medical students as well as specialist training and post-graduate education and training, as well as on the establishment of more autonomous respiratory medicine departments in university hospitals. To facilitate the start of young physicians interested in respiratory medicine, the DGP has established a forum, the working group for promoting junior doctors and researchers, as well as a training academy, the Respiratory Medicine Training Academy, that organizes its own educational and scientific programme and runs a dedicated website for young pneumology professionals. To ensure that Germany does not fall behind international developments in the specialty, the DGP proactively encourages greater emphasis on teaching of respiratory medicine to medical students and the creation of separate university professorships in pneumology.

== History ==
=== Early years: 1910–1933 ===
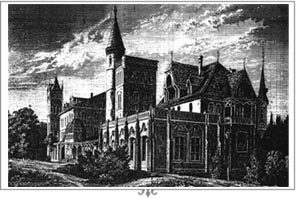
The first German tuberculosis sanatorium, founded by Dr Hermann Brehmer in Görbersdorf (today Poland), about 1870

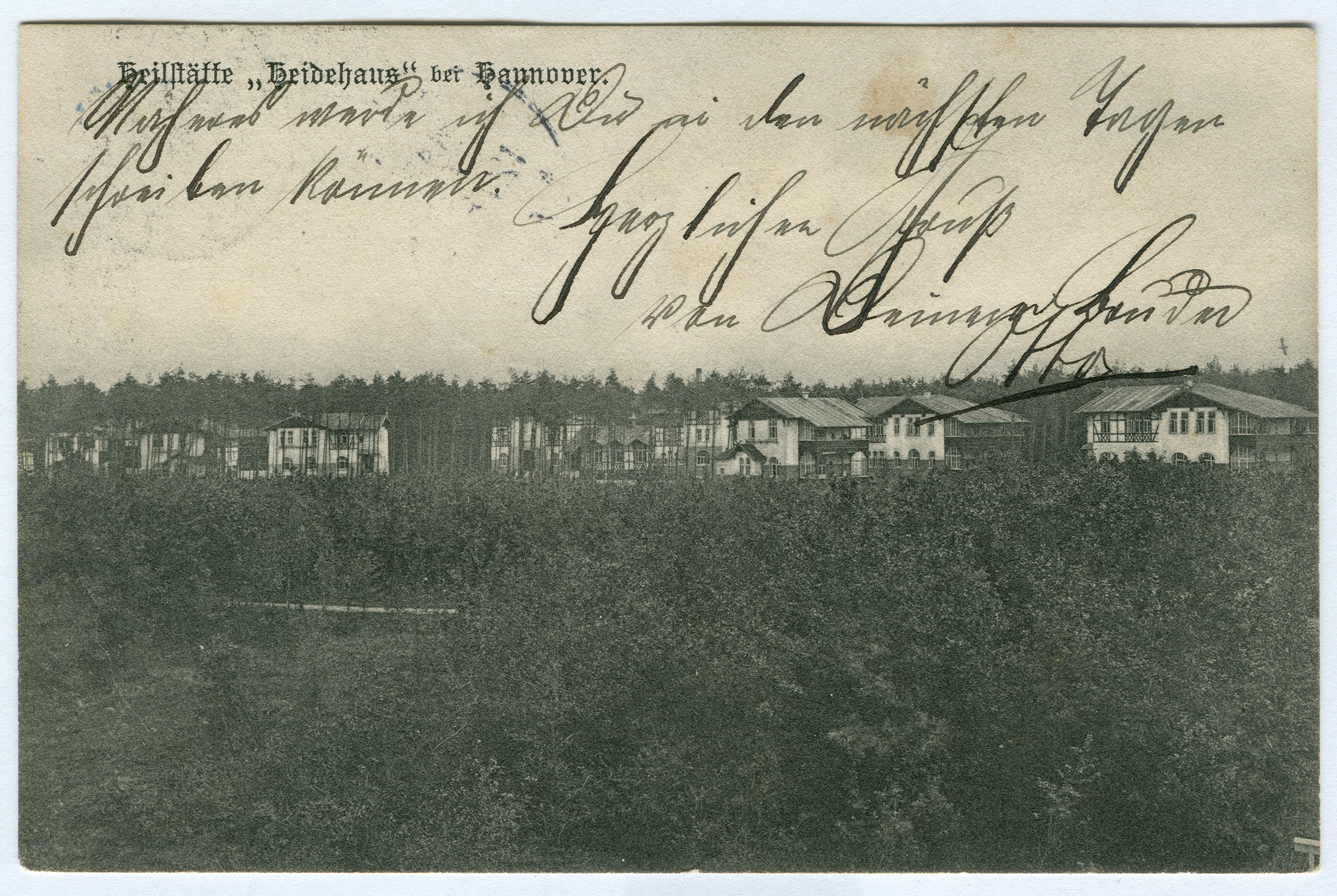
Postcard of Heidehaus, Otto Ziegler’s sanatorium, about 1907

The roots of the DGP go back to the Vereinigung der Lungenheilanstaltsärzte ("Association of Tuberculosis Sanatorium Physicians") founded by, among others, Ludolph Brauer (1865–1951) in 1910. In 1920 it formed a working alliance with the Deutsche Gesellschaft der Tuberkuloseärzte ("German Society of Tuberculosis Physicians"), and in 1925 the two organizations merged to form the Deutsche Tuberkulose-Gesellschaft (DTG – "German Tuberculosis Society"). At the beginning of the twentieth century tuberculosis was the second most common cause of death in Germany. Since the nineteenth century the disease had been a regular topic in medical diagnostics and therapy. Factors such as the publicity given to tuberculosis at congresses of the German Society of Internal Medicine (DGIM), the discovery of the bacillus that caused tuberculosis (Mycobacterium tuberculosis) by Robert Koch in 1882, the popularization of the sanatorium movement in Germany by Peter Dettweiler from 1892 onwards and the foundation of the predecessor of the DZK (1895) were milestones in the fight against the disease. The key principle was not so much the promotion of specialized research activities as an interdisciplinary approach to "gather together the knowledge of tuberculosis scattered and hidden in all the different disciplines". The official celebration of the founding of the DTG took place in Danzig in 1925 on the occasion of a joint meeting of the coalition of the tuberculosis sanatorium physicians and the tuberculosis public health specialists under the chairmanship of Otto Ziegler (1879–1931), medical director of the Heidehaus Sanatorium. The DPG explicitly made a point of working not only with physicians, but also with "representatives of the medical sciences (in particular universities)". It hoped that greater cooperation at both the medical level – a "unanimous collaboration between care institutions, sanatoria and clinics" – and at the level of political parties and organizations would send a clear message to the authorities and the general public. It also emphasized the significance of phthisiology, the forerunner of pneumology, as a separate medical speciality. Among the founders of the DTG were renowned tuberculosis specialists such as Ludolph Brauer, Otto Ziegler, Franz Redeker, Johannes Ritter, Oskar Pischinger and Ernst von Romberg and surgeons such as Ferdinand Sauerbruch. Initially, activities focused on DTG meetings, the detailed minutes ("proceedings") of which appeared in Beiträge zur Klinik der Tuberkulose ("Contributions to the Clinic for Tuberculosis") published by Ludolph Brauer.

=== Nazi era: 1933–1945 ===
As managing director from 1925 to 1945, Julius E. Kayser-Petersen (1886–1954) not only played a central role in the DTG, but as secretary-general of the Reichs-Tuberkulose-Ausschuss ("National Committee on Tuberculosis") and other key positions influenced the tuberculosis policy of the Nazi regime. Under Kayser-Petersen's leadership, membership of the DTG rose rapidly from 379 in 1925 to more than 1,000 in 1941. The DTG's main activity was organizing the congresses, at least up to 1941, when they were suspended due to the war. Conference topics in this period included the inheritability of tuberculosis (TB), tuberculosis sufferers' "suitability for work and marriage" and the possibility of giving them a special status ("compulsory detention").

The dangers of smoking, which Fritz Lickint (1898–1960) convincingly proved in case studies in the 1920s, and the anti-tobacco campaign of Nazi Germany, culminated in the recommendation of a complete ban on smoking in all tuberculosis sanatoria and clinics in 1939.

During the Nazi era, TB was no longer seen as a disease of the poor; it was suddenly considered a sign of a person's "asocial" nature. Nazi politicians had proclaimed that it was every German citizen's "duty to be healthy", and being ill became tantamount a "dereliction of duty" and a "failure". TB sufferers who were regarded as being "incurable" and "recalcitrant" were stigmatised as being "asocial bacillus spreaders" who had to be dealt with using "compulsory measures". The Nazi ideology saw them as being worthless to the "Aryan German people's community"; they were socially neglected, sometimes systematically starved and even singled out to be murdered in euthanasia centres and concentration camps. Doctors (among them GRS members) took part.

In 2018, the GRS published a book about the role of the GRS during the Nazi era. They also published an abridged version in English.

=== Postwar period: since 1947 ===
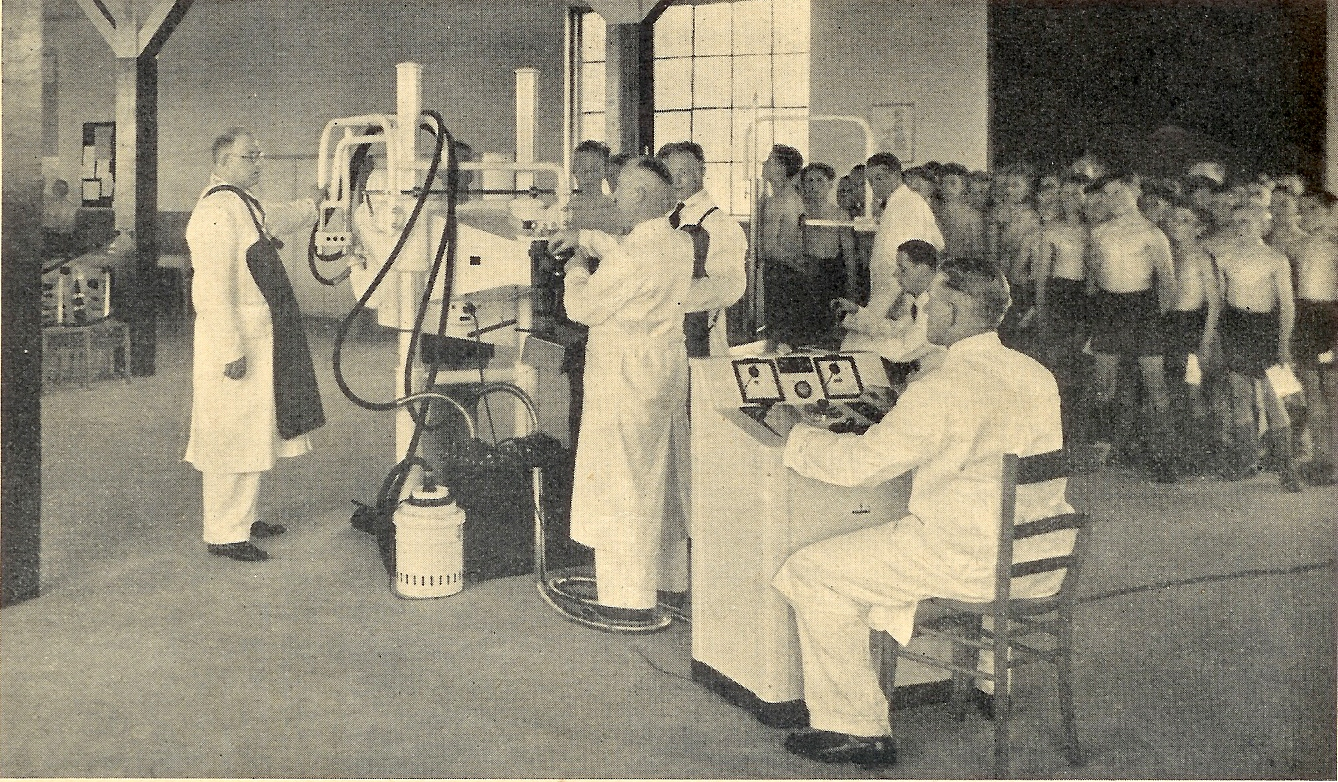
Mass screening of apprentices in a steelwork in Mannheim, 1939

The DTG was dissolved in 1945, and congresses resumed only in 1947 after the Society was re-established under the chairmanship of Franz Ickert (1883–1954). Renewed rampant tuberculosis dominated the work of the DTG in the postwar period. Despite different approaches, the prevalence of the disease followed a similar pattern in both German states. Whereas the German Democratic Republic (GDR) sought to combat tuberculosis through statewide centralized preventive measures (BCG vaccination and serial X-ray screening), the Federal Republic of Germany achieved dramatic results with the early use of new tuberculosis antibiotics. As tuberculosis rates fell in both German states in the 1950s, sanatoria were gradually replaced by special chest hospitals that focused on diseases such as lung cancer, asthma, chronic bronchitis and emphysema (COPD), interstitial lung disease and general environmental and occupational lung diseases. This evolution in developments is reflected in changes in the names of the two scientific respiratory societies in East and West Germany. Initially, the names contained only the term tuberculosis; lung disease was added in the early 1960s, and finally the terms "respiratory diseases and tuberculosis" (1980 West) and "bronchopulmonary diseases and tuberculosis" (1976 East), respectively.

=== Scientific respiratory societies in the GDR and the FRG ===
With the founding of the Wissenschaftliche Tuberkulose-Gesellschaft in der Deutsche Demokratische Republik ("Scientific Tuberculosis Society in the German Democratic Republic") in 1957, the DTG split into an East German and a West German organization, which were reunited in 1991. Although external factors such as standards of health care and opportunities for professional exchanges dictated different development paths, there were also parallels, e.g. the wider focus on other lung diseases (pneumonia and pulmonary hypertension) and new techniques in pulmonary function diagnostics and endoscopy, improvements in graduate training for specialists (basic training in internal medicine, followed by training in respiratory medicine) and the introduction of specialist working groups and the development of guidelines and recommendations.

=== Changes after 1990 ===
The DGP integrated medical advances in pulmonary function diagnostics, bronchoscopy, oxygen long-term therapy and computer tomography into its work, as did other forums such as the Gesellschaft für Lungen- und Atemwegsforschung ("Society for Lung and Airway Research"). From the mid-1970s the DGP's activities stagnated, as reflected in the drop in membership (lowest level 1984: 900). This changed only in the mid-1990s, following the merger of the two German societies to form the Deutsche Gesellschaft für Pneumologie (DGP, "German Respiratory Society") in 1991 and efforts initiated by a group of young pneumologists to reform the organization and structure of the DGP in 1992. Reforms included the introduction of scientific sections, the appointment of a congress president, the restructuring of the annual congress with plenary sessions, symposiums, hot-topic sessions and workshops and participation in anti-smoking PR campaigns of the Deutsche Lungenstiftung ("German Lung Foundation"), e.g. Be Smart Don’t Start. The increase in the number of congress participants (see Annual congress above) and members testifies to the positive impact of these changes: In the past 20 years membership has almost tripled (1992: 1,117; 2002: 2,063; 2012: 3,093).

== Organization ==
The work of the honorary members of the board of directors and the full-time management has the support of a scientific advisory committee made up of representatives of the leading respiratory organizations in Germany and the scientific sections. The work of the 15 scientific sections and 9 working groups that focus on different aspects of respiratory medicine and on professional relationships is crucial for the DPG. In particular the scientific sections reflect the cross-links between respiratory medicine and other medical specialties, highlight key issues within the DGP and serve as forums for scientific exchange, joint research projects and initiatives on DGP policy. The sections, each of which is, as a rule, headed by two spokespersons, offer their members regular postgraduate educational programmes and draw up the guidelines approved and published by the DGP. The following sections have been established since 1994:

1. Allergology and Immunology
2. Endoscopy
3. Occupational medicine, epidemiology, environmental and social medicine
4. Infectiology and tuberculosis
5. Intensive care medicine/ventilatory support
6. Cardiorespiratory interaction
7. Clinical respiratory medicine
8. Sleep medicine
9. Paediatric respiratory medicine
10. Pathophysiology and aerosol medicine
11. Respiratory oncology
12. Prevention and rehabilitation
13. Thoracic surgery
14. Cell biology
15. Allied health professionals

Working group priorities are: 1. graduate and postgraduate training and education in respiratory medicine, 2. the role of quality assurance and DRG in respiratory medicine, 3. spiroergometry, 4. women pneumologists, 5. tobacco prevention and cessation, 6. palliative medicine, 7. promoting young doctors and scientists, 8. respiratory therapists, 9. telemedicine in respiratory medicine.

== Publications and recommendations ==
Since 1980 the DGP, often in cooperation with other organizations (DAL, DZK), has drawn up more than 100 guidelines and recommendations, which are coordinated by a guidelines group formed especially for this purpose. Examples of cooperative projects include the so-called 2009 CAP guideline and the 2010 guideline "Prävention, Diagnostik, Therapie und Nachsorge des Lungenkarzinoms" ("Prevention, diagnosis, therapy and follow-up of lung cancer"). The "Leitlinie zur Diagnostik und Therapie der idiopathischen Lungenfibrose" ("Guideline for diagnosis and management of idiopathic pulmonary fibrosis") has also appeared in 2013. In addition to position papers and statements on current specific lung-related topics, the DGP publishes recommendations on e.g. "Infektionsprävention bei Tuberkulose" ("Tuberculosis infection control", 2012) and "Belastungsuntersuchungen in der Pneumologie" ("Exercise testing in respiratory medicine", 2013). The DGP was also involved in the publication of the German "Lung White Book" in 1996; the fourth edition will appear in autumn 2013.

- Deutsche Gesellschaft für Pneumologie und Beatmungsmedizin: 100 Jahre DGP – 100 Jahre deutsche Pneumologie. Springer, Heidelberg 2010, ISBN 978-3-642-11453-3.
- Helmut Fabel, Nikolaus Konietzko (eds.): Weißbuch Lunge. 3rd ed. Thieme, Stuttgart/New York 2005, ISBN 3-13-104543-4.
- Rudolf Ferlinz: Die Tuberkulose in Deutschland. In: Nikolaus Konietzko (ed.): 100 Jahre Deutsches Zentralkomitee zur Bekämpfung der Tuberkulose (DZK). Der Kampf gegen die Tuberkulose. pmi-Verl.-Gruppe, Frankfurt/M. 1996, ISBN 3-89119-368-8, pp. 9–51.
- Julius-E. Kayser-Petersen: Vorwort. In: Verhandlungen der Deutschen Tuberkulose-Gesellschaft. Bericht über die 1. Tagung am 28. und 29. Mai 1926, p. 198.
- Nikolaus Konietzko, Rainer Dierkesmann, Robert Kropp et al.: Rückblick auf die ersten 50 Tagungen der Deutschen Gesellschaft für Pneumologie und Beatmungsmedizin (DGP). In: Pneumologie. 63, 2009, ISSN 0934-8387, pp. 111–135.
- Nikolaus Konietzko (ed.): 100 Jahre Deutsches Zentralkomitee zur Bekämpfung der Tuberkulose (DZK). Der Kampf gegen die Tuberkulose. pmi-Verl.-Gruppe, Frankfurt/M. 1996, ISBN 3-89119-368-8.
- Robert Loddenkemper, Rainer Dierkesmann, Nikolaus Konietzko, Robert Kropp, Bernhard Wiesner, Vera Seehausen: 100 Jahre DGP – 100 Jahre deutsche Pneumologie. In: Pneumologie. Band 64, 2010, ISSN 0934-8387, pp. 7–17.
- Robert Loddenkemper: Entwicklungen in der DGP: Fakten und Zahlen. In: Pneumologie. 66, 2012, ISSN 0934-8387, pp. 399–401.
- K.-F. Rabe: The Year of the Lung – Das Jubiläumsjahr der DGP. In: Pneumologie. 64, 2010, ISSN 0934-8387, pp. 533–534.
- W. Seeger, T. Welte, O. Eickelberg, M. Mall, K.-F. Rabe, B. Keller, S. Winkler, U. Koller: Das Deutsche Zentrum für Lungenforschung – Translationale Forschung für Prävention, Diagnose und Therapie von Atemwegserkrankungen. In: Pneumologie. 66, 2012, ISSN 0934-8387, pp. 464–469.

== See also ==
- European Sleep Apnea Database
