= Research Institute for Operations Management =

Coordinates: 50°46′49″N 6°04′52″E

FIR (Institute for Industrial Management) is an associated research institute at RWTH Aachen, Germany. FIR has three main departments Information Management, Production Management and Service Management. FIR actively contributes to the European and German research communities as well as to the German industry. The focus of scientific research and industrial consultancy is driven by the departmental competencies. These competencies also define the staff profiles, which in core, consist of researchers attaining their PHDs during their stay at FIR.
