= Associate of Science in Respiratory Care =

Degree

An Associate of Science in Respiratory Care (ASRC) is an entry-level tertiary education respiratory therapy degree. In the United States, this type of degree is usually awarded by community colleges or similar respiratory schools. Some four-year colleges also offer this degree.

== Respiratory care practice ==
Students in the United States awarded an Associate of Science in Respiratory Care are qualified to sit for the three credentialing examinations, NBRC-ELE, NBRC-WRE, and NBRC-CSE, and then apply for licensure as a registered respiratory therapist.

== Similar degrees ==
- Associate of Respiratory Therapy (ART)
- Associate of Applied Science in Respiratory Therapy (AAS)
- Associate of Science in Advanced Respiratory Therapy (ASART)
- Associate Degree in Respiratory Therapy (ADRT)
- Associate of Science in Cardiopulmonary Sciences (ASCS)
