= Certified respiratory therapist =

A Certified Respiratory Therapist (CRT), formerly Certified Respiratory Therapy Technician (CRTT), is a therapist who has graduated from a respiratory therapy program at a university or college and has passed a national certification exam.

== Examinations ==
- In the United States the examination is one of two levels of the National Board for Respiratory Care examination, which was the only level of respiratory therapist testing available until the creation of the RRT. Graduates of accredited associate level college programs or higher (bachelor, masters) are eligible to sit for this examination..

== See also ==
- Respiratory therapy
- Certified Pulmonary Function Technician
