= College of Respiratory Therapists of Ontario =

- Company type: Health regulator
- Industry: Health care
- Founded: 1991
- Headquarters: Ontario, Canada
- Area served: Canada
- Website: http://www.crto.on.ca/

The College of Respiratory Therapists of Ontario (CRTO) regulates the profession of respiratory care by setting out requirements for entry to practise in Ontario, Canada. Authorized by the legislation "Regulated Health Professionals Act" in Ontario, the role of the College of Respiratory Therapists of Ontario is to regulate the practice of respiratory therapy and govern the registered respiratory therapists. Respiratory therapy has been an established health care profession in Canada since 1964. The CRTO sets out entry requirements for practicing, and develops standards of practice.

== Accreditation ==
The College of Respiratory Therapists of Ontario approves members and applicants from schools accredited by the Council on Accreditation for Respiratory Therapy Education (CoARTE). Graduates from approved programs are eligible to register in the graduate class of registration, they are also eligible to write the Canadian Board for Respiratory Care (CBRC) examination.

== Regulation ==
The College of Respiratory Therapists of Ontario approves and regulates respiratory therapists in Ontario.

== See also ==
- American Association for Respiratory Care
- National Board for Respiratory Care
