= Canadian Society of Respiratory Therapists =

Canadian professional association

- Established: 1964
- Type: Professional association
- Headquarters: Ottawa, ON
- Region served: Canada
- Website: www.csrt.com

The Canadian Society of Respiratory Therapists (CSRT), known in French as la Société canadienne des thérapeutes respiratoires, is the national professional association for respiratory therapists in Canada. With a vision of empowering respiratory therapists to provide exemplary leadership and care, the CSRT focuses on providing respiratory therapists with a voice at the national, provincial and local levels; a professional community for respiratory therapists to collaborate and learn; the tools and resources to deliver evidence-informed care and on providing excellent service to members. It represents respiratory therapists and publicly promotes the profession to the federal, provincial/territorial governments and decision-makers.

== Education and credentialing ==
The CSRT is the credentialing body for respiratory therapists working in non-regulated jurisdictions in Canada, conferring the Registered Respiratory Therapist credential. It also confers the national Certified Clinical Anesthesia Assistant designation.

== Publications ==
The CSRT is the publisher of the open-access journal the Canadian Journal of Respiratory Therapy. This journal is indexed in PMC (Pubmed Central), Scopus/Embase, Google Scholar, CINAHL, and the Directory of Open Access Journals.

The CSRT publishes position statements on topics of importance to cardiorespiratory health and the profession.

== Annual Events ==
The CSRT hosts the annual national conference for respiratory therapists in Canada. This large annual gathering of respiratory therapists and other professionals involved in respiratory care from across Canada and internationally offers a variety of educational presentations, networking and social events, interactions with vendors, and opportunities for its communities of practice to meet and innovate. The CSRT proclaims the last week in October as Respiratory Therapy Week, a week to celebrate and promote the profession.

== Awards ==
The CSRT is a recipient of the Canadian Society of Association Executives Excellence Award (2019) for its innovative and efficient infrastructure renewal project.
