= European Respiratory Society =

- Abbreviation: ERS
- Formation: 1990
- Headquarters: Lausanne (Switzerland)
- President: Silke Ryan
- Website: www.ersnet.org

The European Respiratory Society, or ERS, is a non-profit organization with offices in Lausanne, Brussels and Sheffield. It was founded in 1990 in the field of respiratory medicine. The organization was formed with the merger of the Societas Europaea Physiologiae Clinicae Respoiratoriae (founded in 1966) and the European Society of Pneumology (founded 1981). The organization's membership is made up of medical professionals and scientists working in the area of respiratory medicine.

ERS founded the European Lung Foundation (ELF) in 2000. The foundation aims to bring together patients and the public with respiratory professionals to positively influence lung health.

== Activities ==
The ERS publishes academic journals and books as well as hosting events aimed at educating health professionals, including a large annual congress. The organization's stated goal is to "promote lung health in order to alleviate suffering from disease and drive standards for respiratory medicine globally".

== Publications ==
The ERS publishes a range of journals, books and one-off projects.

- The European Respiratory Journal is a monthly peer-reviewed scientific journal, indexed in Medline. The chief editor is James Chalmers.
- The European Respiratory Review is published quarterly and focuses on state-of-the-art reviews, updates, editorials and correspondence on current topical issues in respiratory medicine, science and surgery. Its chief editor is Rory E. Morty.
- ERJ Open Research is an open access research journal, launched in 2015. Its chief editor is Woo-Jung Song.
- Breathe is a clinically focused educational journal, also published quarterly. Its chief editor is Imran Sulaiman.
- The ERS Monograph is a quarterly book series. Each book, guest edited by leaders in the field, focuses on a particular area of respiratory medicine and explores it in depth. The series editor is Peter Calverley.
- The ERS Handbooks are a series of textbooks that aim to cover a broad area of respiratory medicine in a concise yet comprehensive way. Available titles cover a range of areas, and a self-assessment book is available.
- The ERS Buyers' Guide to Respiratory Care Products is no longer published.

In addition to these publications, the ERS previously published two editions the European Lung White Book - a survey of the impact of respiratory disease across Europe, and has published the one-off booklets Air Quality and Health and the European Respiratory Roadmap as well as the European COPD Audit Report and reports on global respiratory health, published on behalf of the Forum of International Respiratory Societies.

== See also ==
- European Sleep Apnea Database
- German Respiratory Society
- Kazakhstan National Respiratory Society
- American Association for Respiratory Care
