= European Respiratory Journal =

- Discipline: Respirology, pulmonology
- Language: English
- Edited by: James D. Chalmers

Publication details
- History: 1988–present
- Publisher: European Respiratory Society
- Frequency: Monthly
- Impact factor: 17 (2023)

Standard abbreviations
- ISO 4: Eur. Respir. J.

Indexing
- CODEN: ERJOEI
- ISSN: 0903-1936 (print); 1399-3003 (web)
- OCLC no.: 1274466660

Links
- Journal homepage

The European Respiratory Journal is a monthly peer-reviewed medical journal covering respirology. It was established in 1988 and is published by the European Respiratory Society, of which it is the official journal. The editor-in-chief is James D. Chalmers (University of Dundee). According to the Journal Citation Reports, the journal had a 2023 impact factor of 17.
