= Respiratory therapist =

Practitioner in cardio-pulmonary medicine

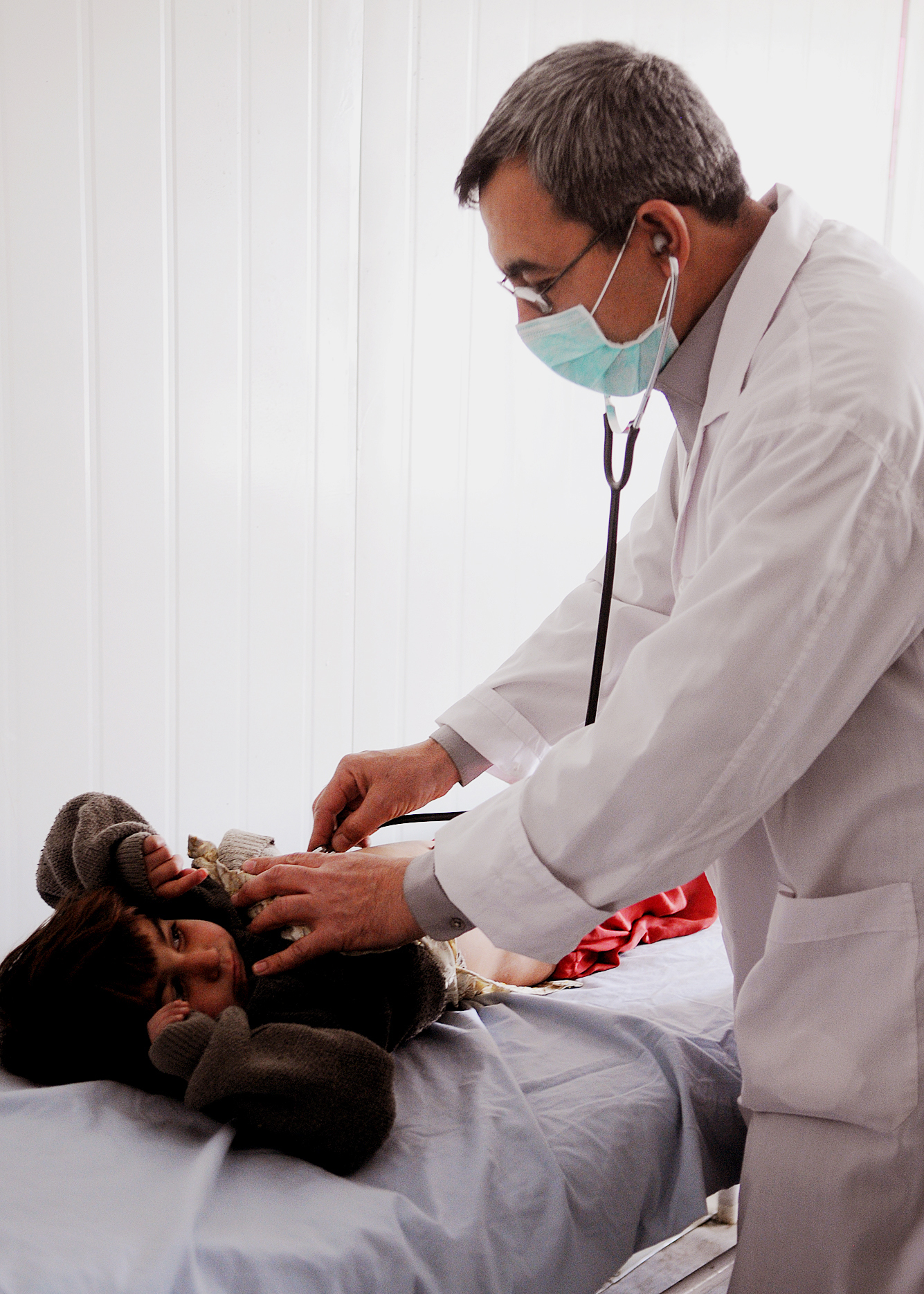
- A clinician listening to the chest of a pediatric patient

Occupation
- Names: Respiratory therapist; Respiratory practitioner; Respiratory care practitioner; Licensed respiratory therapist
- Occupation type: Specialty
- Activity sectors: Respiratory therapy, medicine, allied health, pulmonology, critical care medicine, emergency medicine

Description
- Education required: Associate's in Applied Science or Technology (depending on the college) and a certificate in Respiratory Therapy, or an Associate's of Science in Respiratory Care; Bachelor of Science in Respiratory Care; Master of Science in Respiratory Care
- Fields of employment: Hospital; Clinic; Laboratory
- Related jobs: Pulmonologist; Physician assistant

A respiratory therapist is a specialized healthcare practitioner trained in critical care and cardio-pulmonary medicine in order to work therapeutically with people who have acute critical conditions, cardiac and pulmonary disease. Respiratory therapists graduate from a college or university with a degree in respiratory therapy and have passed a national board certifying examination. The National Board for Respiratory Care (NBRC) is responsible for credentialing as a certified respiratory therapist (CRT), or registered respiratory therapist (RRT) in the United States. The Canadian Society of Respiratory Therapists and provincial regulatory colleges administer the RRT credential in Canada.

The American specialty certifications of respiratory therapy include CPFT and RPFT (certified or registered pulmonary function technologist), ACCS (adult critical care specialist), NPS (neonatal/pediatric specialist), and SDS (sleep disorder specialist).

Respiratory therapists may work in hospitals, laboratories, sleep labs, and home care (specifically durable medical equipment and home oxygen).

Respiratory therapists are specialists and educators in many areas including cardiology, pulmonology, and sleep therapy. Respiratory therapists are clinicians trained in advanced airway management; establishing and maintaining the airway during management of trauma, and intensive care.

Respiratory therapists initiate and manage life support for people in intensive care units and emergency departments, stabilizing, treating and managing pre-hospital and hospital-to-hospital patient transport by air or ground ambulance.

In the outpatient setting, respiratory therapists work as educators in asthma clinics, ancillary clinical staff in pediatric clinics, and sleep-disorder diagnosticians in sleep clinics. They also serve as clinical providers in cardiology clinics and cath-labs, as well as working in pulmonary rehabilitation.

== Clinical practice ==
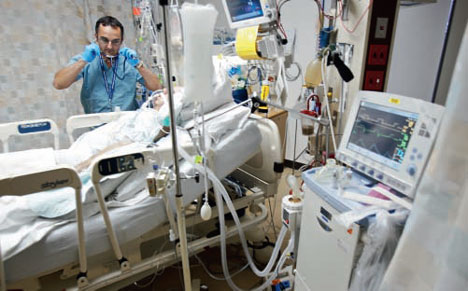
Respiratory therapist in an intensive care unit

Respiratory therapy includes a variety of treatments to help with breathing and support the heart's work. Giving oxygen and drugs to ease breathing are two examples. Respiratory therapists also do patient assessments.

=== Intensive care and operating room ===
Respiratory therapists educate, assist in diagnosing, and treat people who have heart and lung problems. Specialized in both cardiac and pulmonary care, respiratory therapists often collaborate with specialists in pulmonology and anaesthesia in various aspects of clinical care of patients. Respiratory therapists play a vital role in both medicine and nursing, such as the initiation and maintenance of mechanical ventilation.

=== Outpatient clinical practice ===
Respiratory therapists are also primary clinicians in conducting tests to measure lung function and teaching people to manage asthma, chronic obstructive pulmonary disorder among other cardiac and lung functions.

Internationally, respiratory therapists that provide lung function testing are termed respiratory scientists, but in North America, they may be called a respiratory therapist.

=== Home-health care ===
Outside of clinics and hospitals, respiratory therapists often manage home oxygen needs of patients and their families, providing around the clock support for home ventilators and other equipment for conditions like sleep apnea.

In the clinic or outpatient setting respiratory therapists assist with diagnosis and serve as an educator for patients with cardiac and respiratory illness. In the United States, respiratory therapists with certification as registered respiratory therapists evaluate and treat patients with a great deal of autonomy under the direction of a pulmonologist. In facilities that maintain critical care transport teams, respiratory therapists are a preferred addition to all types of surface or air transport.

=== Public education ===
Respiratory therapists are found in schools as asthma educators, working with teachers and coaches about childhood symptoms of asthma and how to spot an emergency. In the United States, legislation has been unsuccessfully introduced several times to allow respiration therapists certified as asthma specialists with registered respiratory therapist certification to prescribe and manage previously diagnosed respiratory patients in physician clinics. In sleep clinics, respiratory therapists work with physicians in the diagnosis of sleep-related illnesses. Respiratory therapists in the United States are migrating toward a role with autonomy similar to the extension of the physician like the physician assistant. Respiratory therapists are frequently utilized as complete cardiovascular specialists to place and manage arterial accesses, along with peripherally-inserted central catheters.

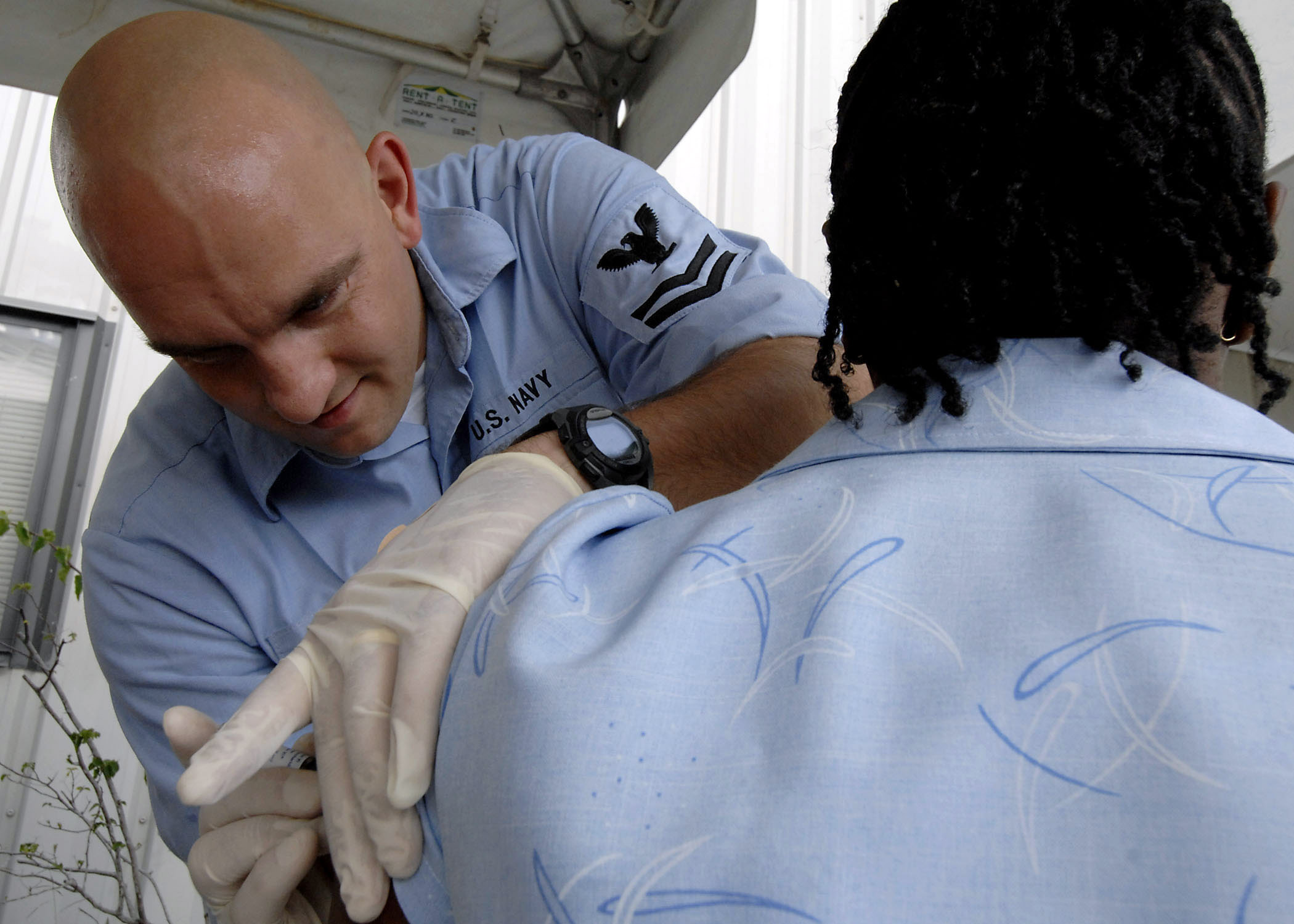
A respiratory therapist gives an immunization to a patient.

== Credentialing and licensure ==
=== United States and Canada ===
In the United States and Canada, respiratory therapists are healthcare practitioners who, after receiving their education, complete a credentialing process and become a certified respiratory therapists (CRTs) or registered respiratory therapists (RRTs).

After satisfactorily completing the required examinations and being added to a registry, the practitioner is then eligible to apply for a license to practice in the region governed by their respective licensing body.

In the United States, specialist respiratory therapists are clinicians who hold National Board for Respiratory Care specialty credentials, which may include neonatal/pediatric specialist (CRT-NPS or RRT-NPS), adult critical care specialist (RRT-ACCS), sleep disorder specialist (CRT-SDS or RRT-SDS), and pulmonary function technologist (CPFT or RPFT). The NBRC's RRT-ACCS examination is the newest NBRC examination: it was introduced in 2012.

In the United States, one must obtain a degree in respiratory care and must then sit for the board exams to become a RRT. RRT is issued by the National Board for Respiratory Care after passing the Therapist Multiple-Choice Examination NBRC-TMC and Clinical Simulation Examination NBRC-CSE examinations. Eligibility for the NBRC-CSE examination is based on scoring high enough on the NBRC-TMC, and holding at least an Associate of Science in Respiratory Care. Professional credentials denoted as a certified asthma educator (AE-C) may also be earned by passing the National Asthma Educator Certification Board (NAECB) exam.

In some parts of Canada, one may practice as a provisional respiratory therapist after graduating, until writing and passing the CBRC exam. The RRT certification is granted through examination by the Canadian Society of Respiratory Therapists.

==== Scope of practice ====
The registered respiratory therapist is typically governed by their medical director for clinical services and their licensing body for laboratory, rehabilitation and home-health services. They are trained in cardiology and pulmonology medicine. The registered respiratory therapist is prepared didactically and clinically to perform advanced procedures and emergency management. Actual scope of practice varies by region and institution.

== International respiratory care ==
Except for the United States and Canada, very few countries have a dedicated professional role for respiratory health. In these countries, respiratory care is provided by physiotherapists, nurses and physicians that have chosen to specialize in this field. In many countries this recognition is in a transition stage. In 2011, a journal from China claimed that hospitals in Beijing, China had begun a recruitment drive to acquire respiratory therapists for their intensive care units, where previously nurses were the only clinicians.

=== Canada ===
Upon graduation from an accredited school of respiratory therapy, the graduate is then eligible to write the national exam administered by the Canadian Board for Respiratory Care.

Success on this examination will then allow the respiratory therapist to register with any licensing body in Canada. Alberta, Manitoba, New Brunswick, Newfoundland and Labrador, Nova Scotia, Ontario, Quebec and Saskatchewan are the Canadian provinces with provincial licensing bodies; in these provinces, it is illegal to practice the profession of respiratory care without first being licensed as a full or provisional member with the provincial licensing body.

These provinces are so-called regulated provinces. In some provinces, one may work provisionally upon graduating, until writing and passing the exam. In all other jurisdictions, the licensing body for the profession of respiratory care is the Canadian Society for Respiratory Therapy.

Registration as a full member with the CSRT is compulsory for respiratory therapists living in non-regulated provinces, and optional for respiratory therapists living in regulated provinces. Registration with the provincial regulatory body or the CSRT (in non-regulated provinces) confers the title of registered respiratory therapist (RRT). Canada and the United States recognize each of their cardio-pulmonary education structure as equal; however, a qualifying exam must be written in order to practice in either nation.

There is pressure for the program to become a degree, in the way that other therapies (physical therapy, occupational therapy) now require a master's degree or greater. However, in some places such as Alberta, Canada, the cardio-pulmonary coursework is only offered at technical schools that are unable to grant a formal degree.

=== France ===
Respiratory therapy is a sub-specialty of physical therapy in France. Respiratory care as a specialty is regulated by the Fédération Française des Masseurs Kinésithérapeutes Rééducateurs.

=== Germany ===
The German Respiratory Society first issued a resolution to develop the dedicated respiratory therapist (RT) role in 2004 as a means to increase the quality of patient care, delegate physician duties and respond to the observed increase in respiratory conditions and diseases. In 2006, a year-long pilot training program was offered to established nurses and physiotherapists. Researchers report that significant additional work is necessary to define and position the role of the respiratory therapist within the current healthcare system.

=== Italy ===
In Italy, the title of respiratory therapist can be acquired by earning a master's degree in respiratory therapy. It consists of lessons and various internships throughout Italian hospitals.

=== Philippines ===
In the Philippines, respiratory therapists are clinicians who have been awarded at minimum a Bachelor of Science in Respiratory Care degree. Licenses to practice respiratory care are regulated by the Professional Regulatory Board of Respiratory therapy and Professional Regulation Commission which was established and is legally maintained by the Philippine Respiratory Therapy Act (Republic Act No. 10024).

=== United Arab Emirates ===
In the United Arab Emirates, respiratory therapists must have been awarded a Bachelor of Science in Respiratory Care. An additional two years of experience is required for foreign applicants. Licenses are maintained and awarded by the Dubai Health Authority. The Dubai Health Authority restricts respiratory therapists to working only in physical medicine and rehabilitation centers, in hospitals, in surgical clinics with cardio-thoracic surgeons and with physicians in family/general practice or pulmonology.

=== Saudi Arabia ===
Saudi Arabia utilizes respiratory therapists in a similar fashion to Canada and the U.S. Some respiratory therapists from North America travel to Saudi Arabia to fill a temporary need.

=== Singapore ===
In Singapore, a respiratory therapist is an allied health professional. They play an integral role in the care of critically ill patients in intensive care units, managing patients on invasive and non-invasive mechanical ventilation, and other respiratory supportive devices. Respiratory therapists are recognized domain experts pertaining to respiratory care, and are responsible for training on respiratory care topics (mechanical ventilation management, artificial airway management, lung protective strategies, diagnostic procedures) for medical students, nursing students, and health care colleagues (nurses, physicians, allied health professions) in hospitals.

As part of their duties, some respiratory therapists are routinely assigned to staff the emergency department, outpatient ambulatory clinics, diagnostic polysomnography laboratories, and pulmonary function test laboratories, to assist with diagnostic procedures for patients.

All respiratory therapists in Singapore have a baccalaureate degree in respiratory therapy awarded by accredited institutions across the region and the United States, and hold board certifications in their country of training.

In 2010, the Association of Respiratory Therapists Singapore (ARTS) was established as the national professional organization for respiratory therapists working in Singapore. It is a recognized international affiliate of the American Association for Respiratory Therapists (AARC). In 2022, ARTS was also inducted as a council member into the International Council for Respiratory Therapists, with two established leaders serving as co-governors to represent the interests of respiratory therapists in Singapore.

As of 2024, services and care provided by respiratory therapists could be found in all public hospitals in the country.

=== United States ===
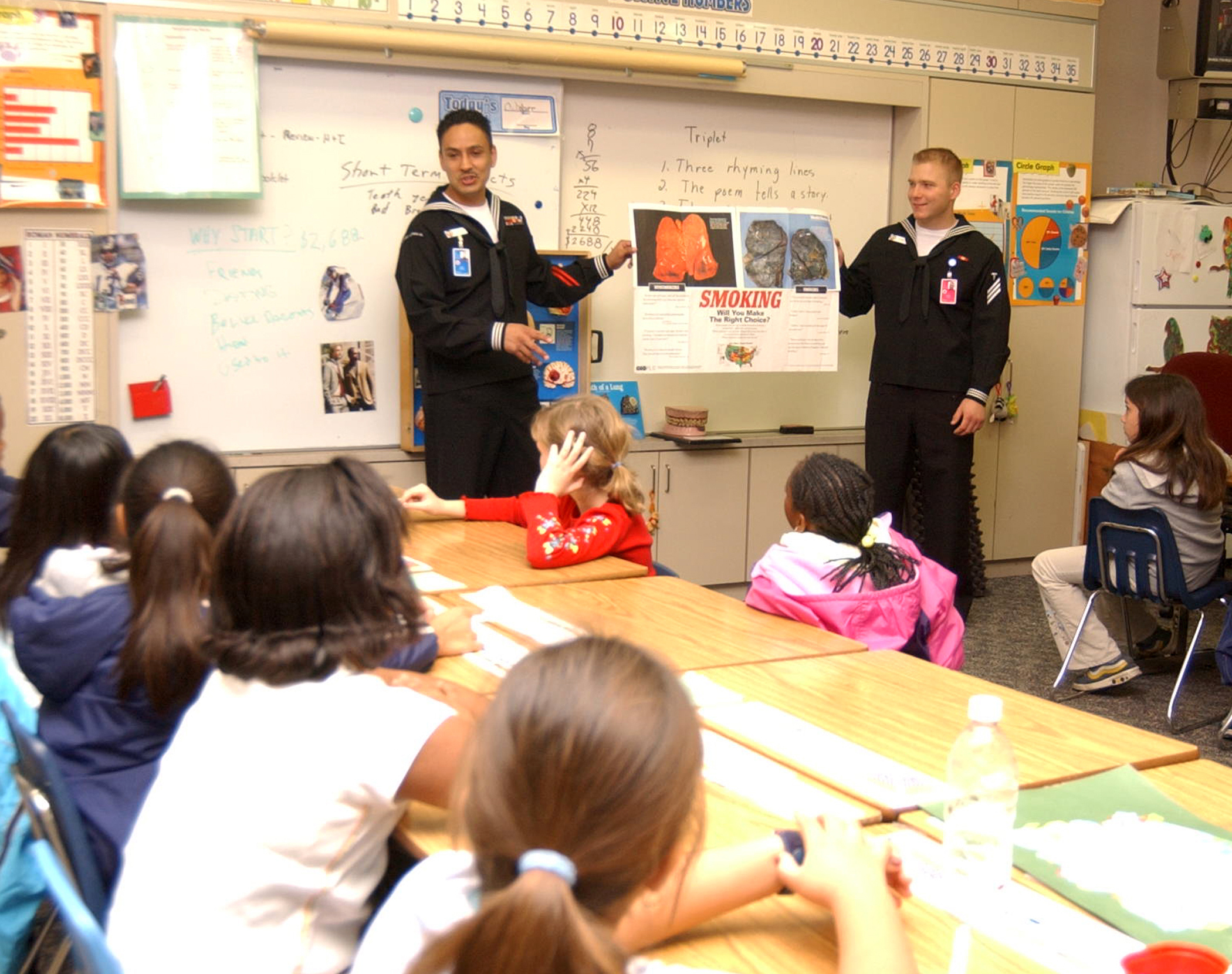
A respiratory therapist teaches students about the dangers of smoking.

In the United States, a respiratory therapist is a clinician who has at a minimum earned an Associate of Science in Respiratory Care degree and completed a certification process. After satisfactorily completing required examinations, administered by either the National Board for Respiratory Care or directly by the individual state licensing board (either the medical examiner's board or a special state respiratory care board), the practitioner is eligible to apply for a license to practice in the region governed by their respective licensing body.

There are two recognized governing bodies in the United States: the State Board of Respiratory Care in the state in which a respiratory therapist is licensed to practice, and the National Board for Respiratory Care (NBRC), a non-profit organization which regulates two levels of certification along with some additional specialist certifications.

Certified respiratory therapist (CRT) is the title given after successfully passing the Therapist Multiple Choice NBRC-TMC exam; the Registered Respiratory Therapist (RRT) certification is given after first making the RRT cut-off score on the TMC exam, and passing the Clinical Simulation Exam NBRC-CSE.

Most state boards of respiratory care require proof of the appropriate NBRC credential and award various license titles, including (but not limited to) respiratory care practitioner, licensed registered respiratory therapist, and licensed certified respiratory therapist.

There has been a substantial push to standardize the state licensure by the American Association for Respiratory Care. The NBRC credential is renewed every five years for a fee, in addition to fees assessed by the state boards of respiratory care.

=== United Kingdom ===
Respiratory therapy in the UK is not a recognized specific profession, but a specialization route available to physicians, nurses, physiotherapists, and occupational therapists.

Common titles include cardio-respiratory physiotherapist, clinical respiratory physiologist (as well as other healthcare scientists), respiratory nurse and cardio-respiratory occupational therapist.

All UK trained physiotherapists receive advanced training in respiratory therapy theory and practice as a core component of their pre-registration physiotherapy degree program. Following qualification and a period of rotations throughout the core areas of physiotherapy practice, they may then follow a career pathway specializing in respiratory physiotherapy. Areas of practice include critical care, respiratory medicine, cystic fibrosis, asthma, hyperventilation syndrome, general and specialized surgery, non-invasive ventilation, ventilation weaning, cardiac and pulmonary rehab, respiratory therapy outpatient clinics and community respiratory therapy. The Association of Chartered Physiotherapists interested in respiratory care is the specialist interest group for UK physiotherapists working within the field of respiratory therapy. All physiotherapists working within the United Kingdom must be registered with the Health and Care Professions Council, regardless of their area of clinical practice, in order to be allowed to work in both the public and private sectors. Respiratory physiotherapy postgraduate master's degree and PhD programs exist within the United Kingdom for suitably qualified and experienced therapists.

The main grouping of healthcare scientists working in areas similar to respiratory therapists are respiratory and sleep physiologists. They perform the majority of comprehensive pulmonary physiological assessments (including cardiopulmonary exercise tests) as well as sleep studies. They might also manage non-invasive ventilation services and undertake allergy testing. Similarly, critical care scientists are involved in many aspects of patient critical care that respiratory therapists might, including the management and application of invasive ventilation technologies and other respiratory adjuncts as well as point-of-care blood testing (including interpreting the results for other clinicians), but are also involved in other areas of critical care, such renal replacement therapy and non-respiratory related patient monitoring; Critical care scientists might also be involved in the provision of non-invasive ventilation services and pre-operative cardiopulmonary exercise testing. Other healthcare science groupings might also occasionally be involved in some of the physiological investigations mentioned above; neurophysiologists might perform sleep studies to investigate neurological reasons for sleep disturbance, while cardiac scientists might perform cardiopulmonary exercise testing focused on the diagnosis of cardiac issues. Since the advent of modernising scientific careers, there has been a largely unitary model of accreditation pathway for healthcare scientists in the UK. The framework can be roughly divided into four stages: an associate/assistant stage (usually not holding any professional registration), a BSc-level practitioner stage eligible for voluntary registration (such as with the Registration Council for Clinical Physiologists or the Academy for Healthcare Science Healthcare Science Practitioner Register), an MSc-level Scientist stage where individuals are eligible for state registration as Clinical Scientists with the Health and Care Professions Council, and a doctoral-level stage that in addition to registration with the Health and Care Professions Council involves registration on the Academy for Healthcare Science Higher Specialist Scientist Register. Those on the Higher Specialist Scientist Register are largely equivalent in seniority to medical consultants, though they cannot prescribe; in respiratory science this might involve the advising on the provision of non-invasive ventilation to complex patients. Healthcare scientists are usually trained to work with all patient age groups.

=== Taiwan ===
In Taiwan, the respiratory therapist is one of the allied health professionals who need a minimum four-year Bachelor of Science in respiratory therapy (care) for the license. According to the Health Professionals Act and Respiratory Therapist Act of 2002, respiratory therapists require "Senior Professional and Technical Examinations" by the Ministry of Examination to get the license.

Most respiratory therapists in Taiwan participate in adult, neonatal and pediatric ICU care for artificial airway maintenance, invasive or non-invasive ventilation management, aerosol therapy, oxygen therapy, inhaled nitric oxide therapy, CPR, chest physiotherapy, artery blood gas analysis, pulmonary rehabilitation, and lung expansion therapy.

Some respiratory therapists are available in pulmonary function testing rooms, respiratory care centers, and respiratory care wards. After five years of experience in hospital, respiratory therapists can set up a home respiratory care office by themselves.

There are five colleges with the Department of Respiratory Therapy including Chang Gung University, Taipei Medical University, Kao Hsiung Medical University, Chang Gung University of Science and Technology (ChiaYi Campus), and Fu Jen Catholic University.

=== Yemen ===
Respiratory care in Yemen started in 2005. It was accredited by Yemeni Medical Council in 2020 as one of the allied medical professions.

Respiratory care professionals need to complete either a minimum three-year Associate of Science in Respiratory Care or four-year Bachelor of Science in respiratory care (BsRC) for the license called YRCLE. There are currently three accredited programs in bachelor degree and one postgraduate program as master of science in respiratory care in Yemen.

Yemen joined the International Council For Respiratory care in 2020 as the third Arabic country, after Saudi Arabia and UAE. It is currently a full member of International Council For Respiratory care. Saleem N. Hamilah, BS, RCP, FNIV, MsRC is the official governor for Yemen.

The Respiratory Care Services Administration (RCSA) is a governmental administration at Yemen's Ministry of Public Health & Population, established in July 2019.

The Yemeni Association for Respiratory Care (YARC) is a non profit organization and is the only professional organization supporting respiratory care in Yemen. In addition to attempting to help respiratory therapists nationally and locally, YARC is trying to promote the profession as a whole to increase interest and membership. It was established in 2017.

== Specialist respiratory therapists ==
=== Anesthesia assistants ===
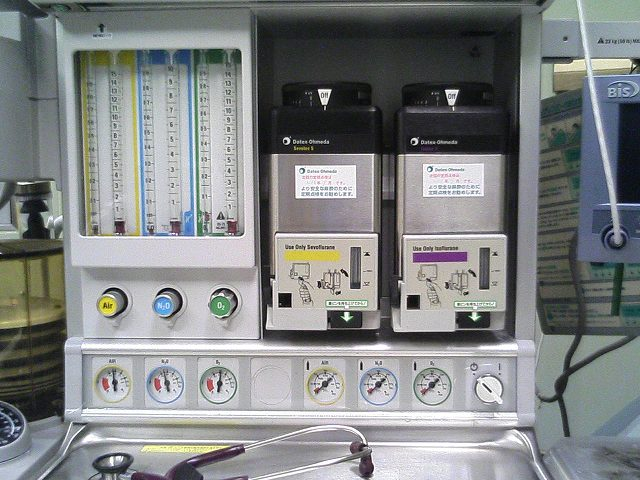
Anesthesia vaporizer

The traditional role of the operating room respiratory therapist includes providing technical support to the anesthesiologist for the proper use and maintenance of the anesthetic gas machine, in addition to providing airway management. In Ontario, Canada, this role in the operating room has evolved to include a more advanced and specialized role, with increasing responsibilities. This "anesthesia assistant" is a distinct occupation from the American "anesthesiologist assistant". These Canadian respiratory therapists are academically prepared to perform activities such as sedation by the administration of anesthetic gases and medications, insertion and management of vascular (arterial and venous) access and assessment of the depth of anesthesia under the guidance of an anesthesiologist. This role is similar to the nurse anesthetist, except that an anesthesia assistant must have an anesthesiologist supervising them, and a nurse anesthetist does not.

=== Asthma specialists ===
Asthma specialists work with clinics, hospitals and schools educators for teachers, parents, patients and practitioners on asthma and allergies. Respiratory therapists in the role of asthma educators also help diagnose and treat asthma and other respiratory illnesses. An asthma educator is the resource clinician in inpatient and outpatient environments for evaluating and advising physicians on treatment plans and helping patients understand and follow the plan. In the United States, certified asthma educators (AE-C) are credentialed by the National Asthma Education Certification Board (NAECB).

In Canada, the Canadian Network for Respiratory Care administers two certifications for the specialization as respiratory therapist asthma educator: the certified asthma educator (CAE) (preferred by practitioners with a pediatric focus) and the certified respiratory educator (CRE), which comprises the CAE program with additional training in COPD.

=== Cystic fibrosis ===
Respiratory therapists work with people with cystic fibrosis in clinics and hospitals by educating them about their disease and working with them on a treatment plan. While admitted to a hospital, patients have their treatment schedule modified and maintained by respiratory therapists.

=== Cardiovascular perfusionist ===
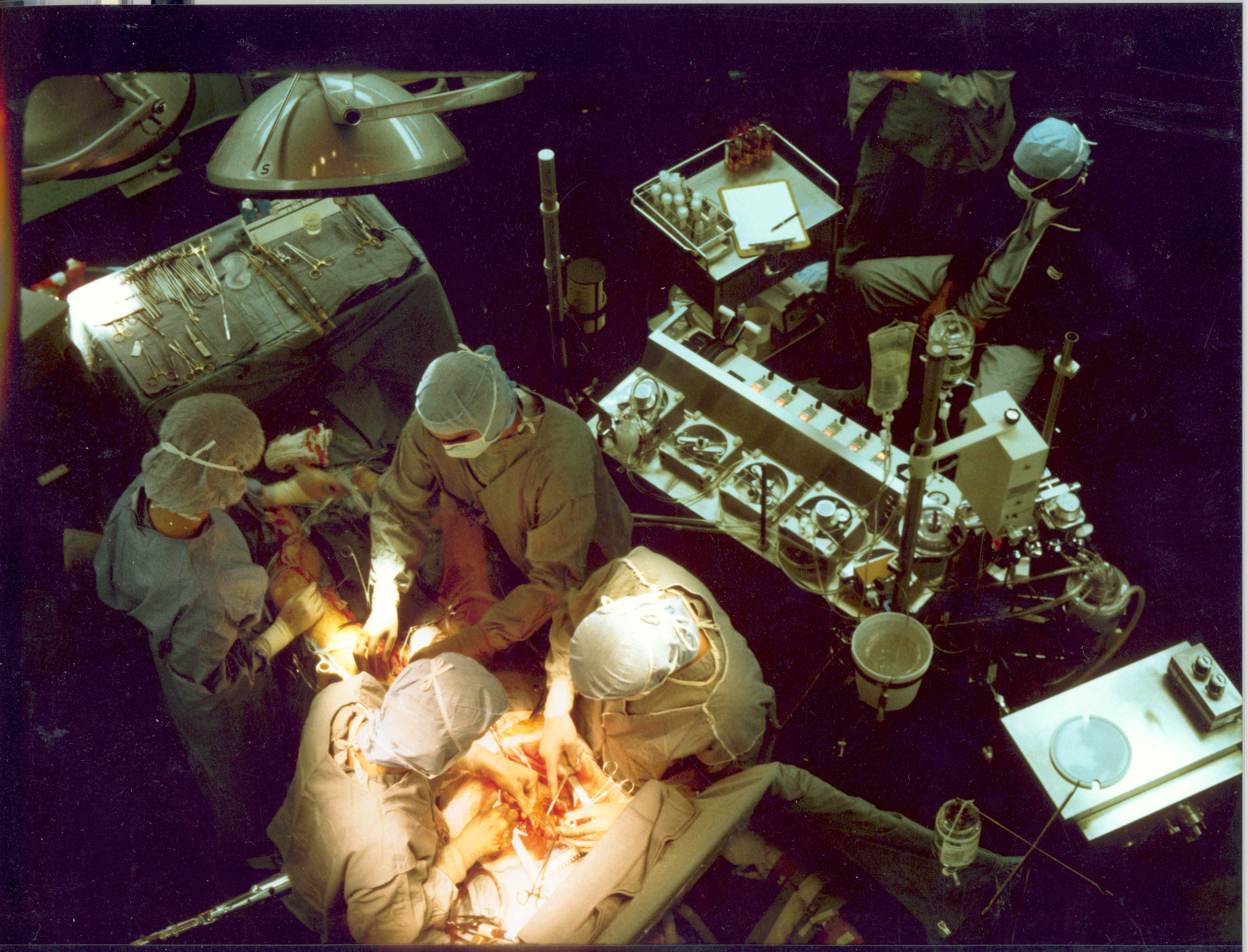
CABG surgery with CPB

A respiratory therapist may fulfill the role of perfusionist with appropriate training. The perfusionist is a highly trained member of the cardiothoracic surgical team (often an RT with extra training), which consists of cardiac surgeons, anesthesiologists, physician assistants, surgical technicians, other respiratory therapists, and nurses. The perfusionist's main responsibility is to support the physiological and metabolic needs of the cardiac surgical patient so that the surgeon may operate on a still, unbeating heart. Perfusionist certifications are maintained and awarded by the American Board of Cardiovascular Perfusion.

=== Extra-corporeal membrane oxygenation ===
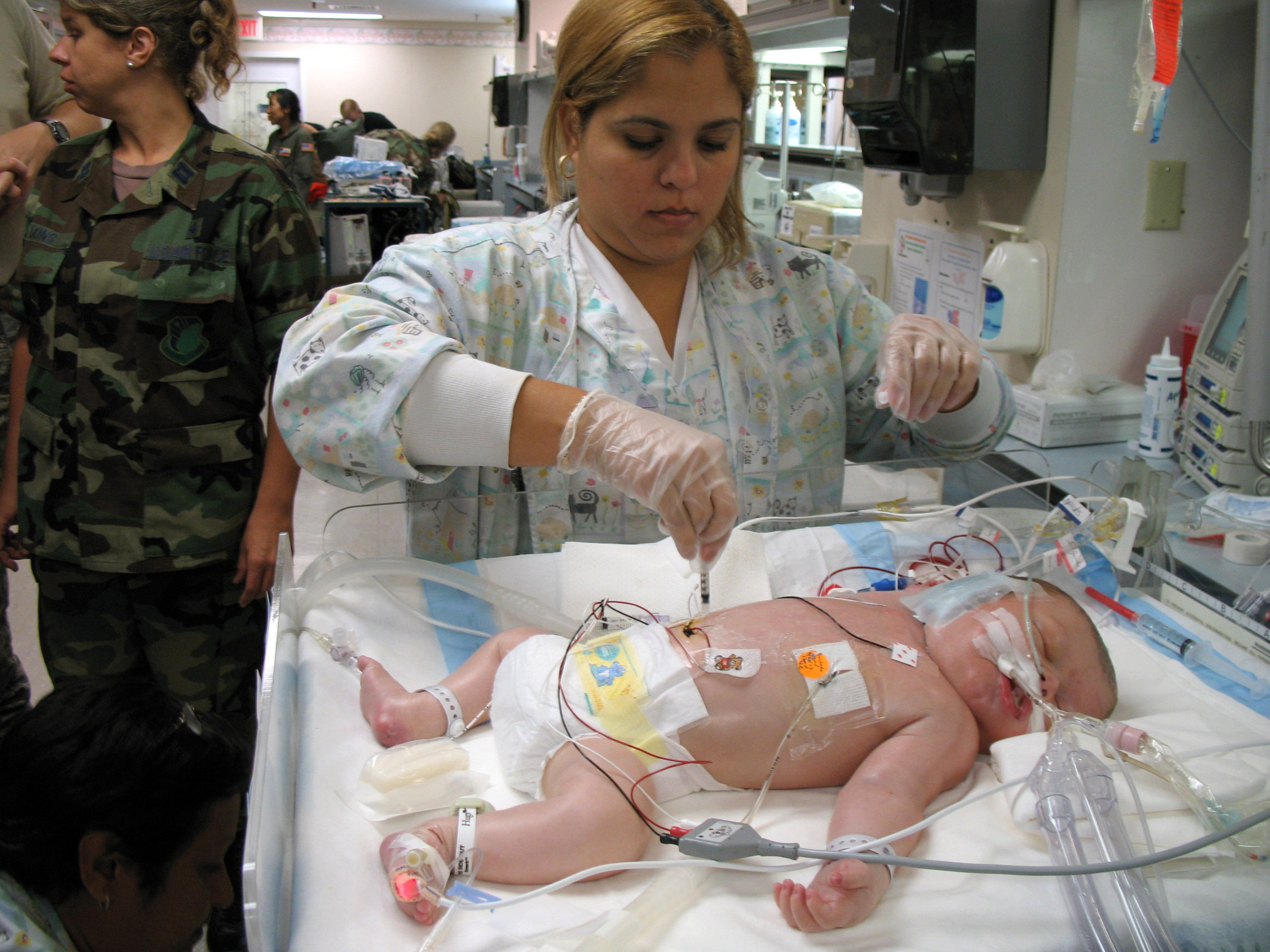
A respiratory therapist takes a blood sample from a 3-day-old in preparation for transfer to an extracorporeal membrane oxygenation unit.

Extracorporeal membrane oxygenation (ECMO) is a modified cardiopulmonary bypass technique used for the treatment of life-threatening cardiac or respiratory failure. An ECMO clinical specialist is a technical specialist trained to manage the ECMO system, including blood pump, tubing, artificial oxygenator, and related equipment.

The ECMO specialist is also responsible for the clinical needs of the patient on ECMO, which may include bedside management of oxygenation and carbon dioxide removal, maintenance of normal acid-base balance, administration of medications, blood and blood products, and maintenance of appropriate anticoagulation therapies for the blood. This ECMO clinical specialist may be the bedside critical care nurse specifically trained in ECMO patient and circuit management, or the ECMO system may be primarily managed by a registered respiratory therapist, or physicians with training as ECMO clinical specialists.

=== Neonatal and pediatric intensive care ===
Much like adult intensivist respiratory therapists, neonatal and pediatric specialists deal primarily with managing life support for the pediatric or neonatal patient. Pediatric respiratory therapists are trained extensively in antenatal and intrapartum patients and family. In the United States a specialist certification exists and is awarded by the National Board for Respiratory Care. This is available to respiratory therapists holding certification as a certified respiratory therapist or registered respiratory therapist, but the registered respiratory therapist is preferred by most institutions.

=== Sleep disorder specialist ===
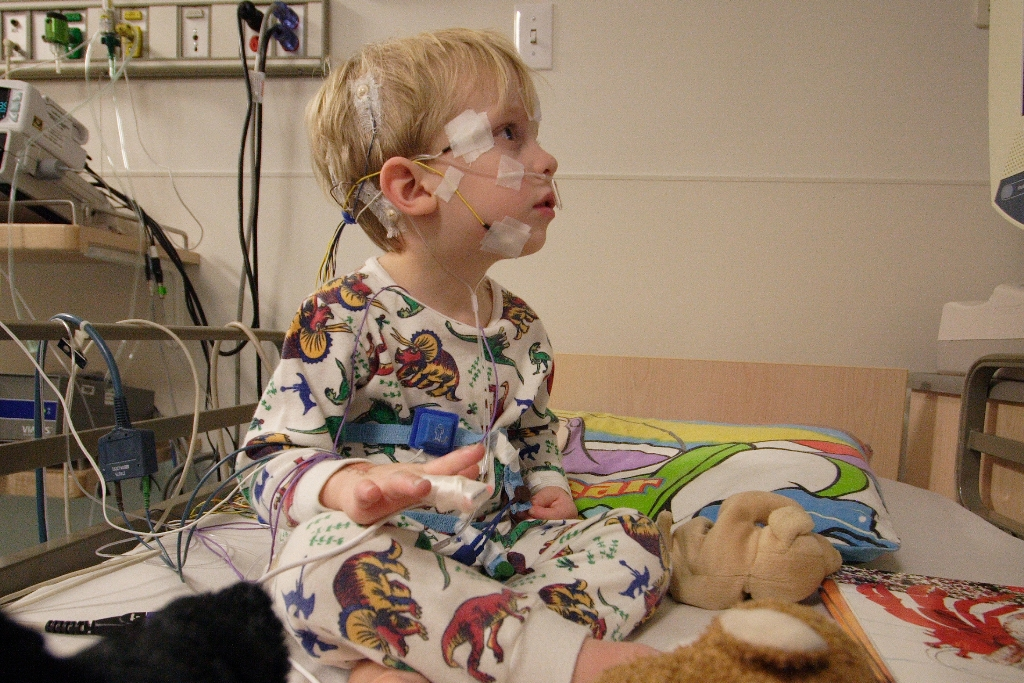
A pediatric patient prepared for a polysomnogram by a respiratory therapist

Respiratory therapists monitor, interpret and diagnose findings from sleep studies, as well as medical histories and physical exams, to diagnose and decide on treatment related to sleep-disorders. A sleep study can also help diagnose narcolepsy.

In the United States a sleep disorder specialist can be a registered respiratory therapist with the sleep disorder specialist certification (RRT-SDS) who performs sleep disorders testing and therapeutic intervention, along with the diagnosis of sleep-related disease such as obstructive sleep apnea or central apnea. In Canada, it is often an RT with additional training to become a Registered Polysomnography Technician (RPSGT)

=== Case management ===
Case management is a collaborative process that assesses, plans, implements, coordinates, monitors, and evaluates the options and services required to meet the client's health and human services needs. It is characterized by advocacy, communication, and resource management, and promotes quality and cost-effective interventions and outcomes. Eligibility and certification are maintained by the Commission for Case Management Certification, a body certifying healthcare professionals in the United States.

=== Surface and air transport specialist ===
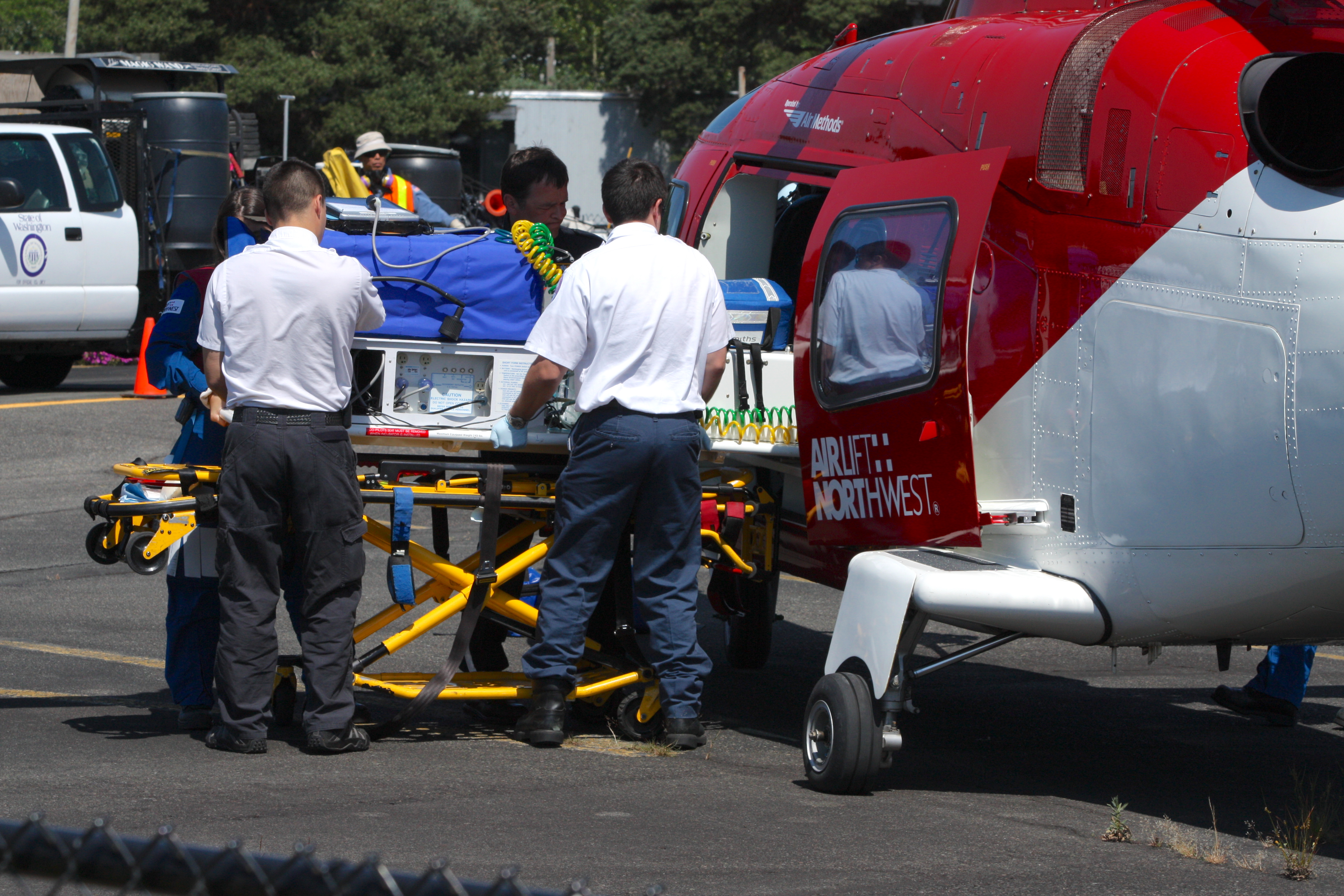
A premature infant on ECMO, a form of heart/lung machine, being transferred between hospitals

Respiratory therapists work with nurses, physicians, and paramedics in emergency flight and ground transport. They are vital practitioners delivering care inside helicopters, air ambulance or ground ambulance working to pick up a patient and move them to a facility that has what they need. In the United States, certification for transport (C-NPT) is currently awarded by The National Certification Corporation.

=== Pulmonary research and science ===
Respiratory therapists are sometimes referred to as respiratory scientists who are specialists in pulmonary function. Respiratory therapists work with pulmonologists in both clinical and general research of the respiratory system, ranging from the anatomy of the respiratory epithelium to the most effective treatment of pulmonary hypertension in pediatrics. Scientific research looks for causes and possible treatment in diseases such as asthma and lung cancer.

== History of respiratory care ==
The profession of respiratory care was officially established in the United States c. 1930, and respiratory research has existed since the early 1900s. During the early years, respiratory therapists were referred to as "oxygen technicians", and most of their activities involved moving cylinders of compressed gas and administering oxygen via nasal catheter or oxygen tent. Most oxygen technicians were trained on the job, although brief training programs began to appear in the late 1940s and 1950s.

Today the profession hardly resembles what it was in the 1940s. Respiratory therapists provide direct care, patient education, and care coordination. They are academically trained in respiratory nursing and respiratory medicine. They practice in acute care facilities, long-term acute care facilities, skilled nursing facilities, assisted-living centers, subacute care units, rehabilitation centers, diagnostics units, and in the home. Respiratory therapist training has also dramatically changed. Current accreditation standards require respiratory therapists to have, at minimum, an Associate of Science in Respiratory Care degree from an accredited program. Legal requirements to practice respiratory therapy have also dramatically changed. 49 states now legally recognize respiratory therapists. Limited permits or state licenses are now required in all states except Alaska, which has no statutory authority over the practice of respiratory care. All states that have licensure requirements also require continuing education.

In 2007, the American Association for Respiratory Care (AARC) began developing recommendations for the promotion of the field of respiratory care in the United States in response to increased concern regarding licensure and credentialing issues, as well as international recognition of those practicing in the U.S. The task force recommended that by 2015 the minimum education requirement for licensure and certification as a respiratory therapist be a bachelor of science in respiratory therapy (BSRT). The AARC task force also recommended that the American Respiratory Care Foundation change its scholarship policies and only award assistance and grants to those working toward a bachelor's degree. The Committee on Accreditation for Respiratory Care (CoARC) was asked by the AARC task force to change its accreditation standards and no longer accredit associate's-level respiratory care programs. The CoARC replied by a press release, rejecting the recommendation. In 2011, legislation introduced by the AARC was expected to help improve the use of respiratory therapists in clinical applications by allowing them to manage patients with asthma and COPD seeing a clinic for routine checkups. Similar bills have been introduced before, and have died in committee.

== See also ==
- List of respiratory therapy organizations
- American Association of Respiratory Care
- Canadian Society of Respiratory Therapists
- Respiratory Care Week
