= JG Faherty =

American novelist

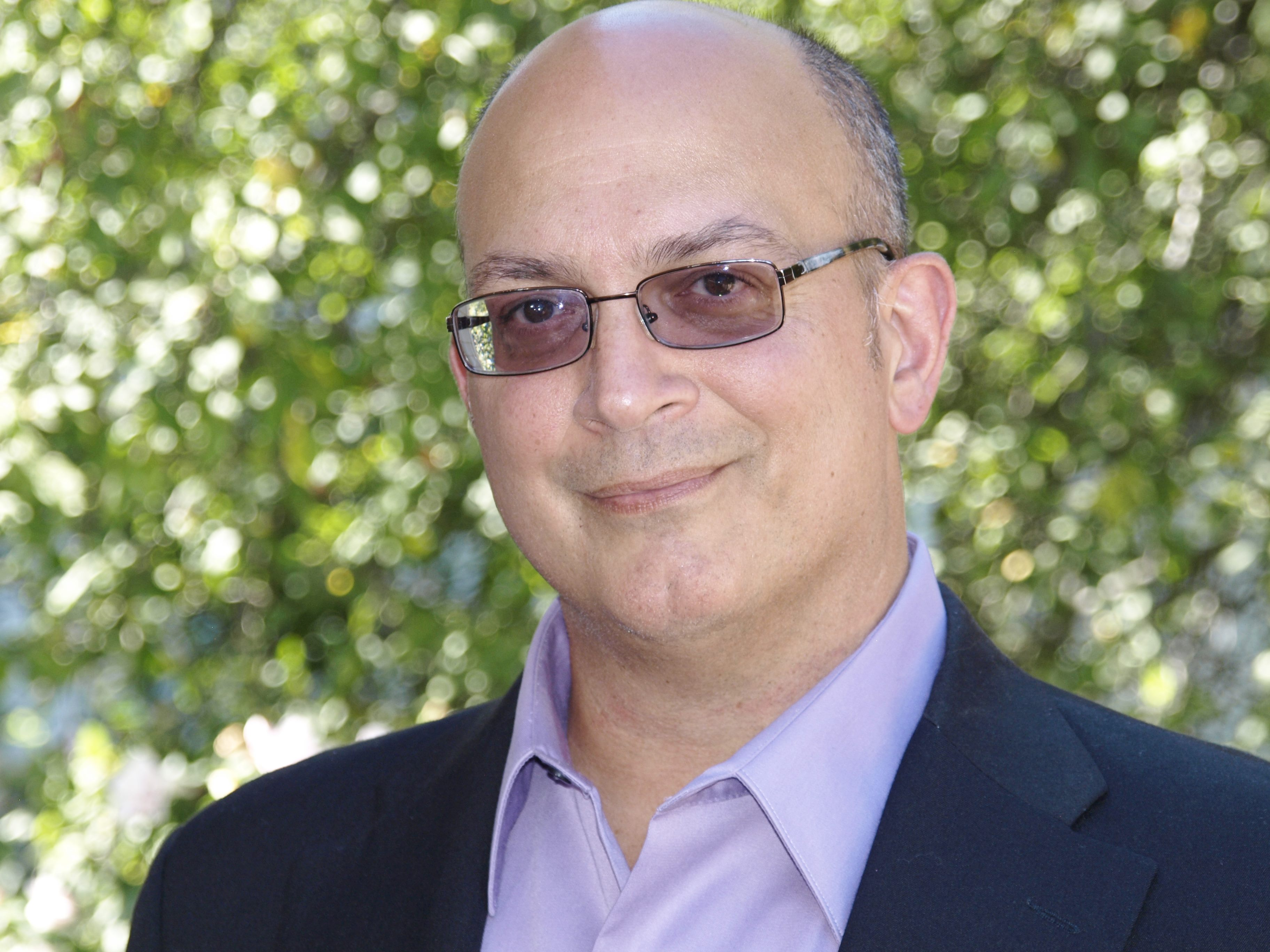
- Born: James Gregory Faherty; January 27, 1961 (age 65); Olean, New York
- Occupations: Novelist; also owns and operates a-perfect-resume.com & milliondollarresumes.com
- Website: JGFaherty.com

James Gregory "JG" Faherty (born January 27, 1961) is an American author who writes in the horror, science fiction, and dark fantasy genres.

Faherty was born in Olean, New York. He moved to Stony Point, New York at the age of four, and resided there on and off until moving to Garnerville in 2011. In 2024 he moved to the Wilmington (Leland) region of North Carolina. He obtained B.S. in Biology at Saint Bonaventure University and has additional graduate credits in Biology.

Between 1987 and 1999, he held jobs in Medical Technology, Laboratory Equipment Repair, Biomedical R&D, Photography, Sales, and Quality control. In 1999, he started his own resume preparation company, A Perfect Resume, and continues to operate it, along with its sister company, Million Dollar Resumes.

In 2002, he began writing short horror and science fiction. His first novel, Carnival of Fear, was published in 2010 by Graveside Tales.

In 2011, his second novel, Ghosts of Coronado Bay (JournalStone Books) was nominated for a Bram Stoker Award for Superior Achievement in YA Horror. In 2012, his paranormal thriller The Burning Time (JournalStone Books) was nominated for the International Thriller Writers' Thriller Award. And in 2015, The Cure was nominated for the Bram Stoker Award (Superior Achievement in a Novel).

In 2012, as the Horror Writers Association's Library Liaison and founder of their YA Literacy and Library programs, Faherty initiated literacy initiatives with several library organizations and established a partnership with Ray Billingsley, creator of the Curtis comic strip seen in more than 250 newspapers, to promote literacy to young adult readers. He played a major role in the creation and growth of the HWA's annual Library Day and the Summer Scares reading program.

In 2013, he partnered with actress/author Amber Benson and musician/actor/writer Richard Christy to promote literacy through horror and dark fiction, science fiction, and other genre fiction.

In 2021, he was named as the Manager of the Horror Writers Association's Mentorship program after serving as a mentor since 2011. He is also a mentor for the Science Fiction and Fantasy Writers Association.

He served as a Trustee on the Horror Writers Association's Board from 2011 to 2022. Previously, he established and oversaw the HWA's Young Adults Write Now program and the associated scholarship for young writers. In 2022, he established and still oversees the HWA's Comics program, which builds partnerships with comic strip artists, including Mark Tatulli, creator of the comic strip Liō, and Scott Nickel, creator of the comic strip Eek!

== Awards & Recognition ==
- Finalist, HWA Bram Stoker Award - Superior Achievement in a Novel (The Cure)
- Finalist, HWA Bram Stoker Award - Superior Achievement in a Young Adult Novel (Ghosts of Coronado Bay)
- Finalist, ITW Thriller Award - Digital Novel (The Burning Time)
- 5-Star Award Winner - Readers' Favorite International Book Awards (Carnival of Fear)
- 5-Star Award Winner - Readers' Favorite International Book Awards (The Cold Spot)
- 5-Star Award Winner - Readers' Favorite International Book Awards (The Cure)
- Best Top 10 (Horror Short Story) - Preditors & Editors Readers' Poll ("The Lazarus Effect")
- Best Top 10 (Horror Short Story) - Preditors & Editors Readers' Poll ("Bones")
- Best Top 10 (Young Adult Novel) - Preditors & Editors Readers' Poll (Ghosts of Coronado Bay)
- Best Top 10 (Young Adult Novel) - Preditors & Editors Readers' Poll (The Changeling)
- Amazon Top 10 Best Seller in Horror (The Cure - #8)
- Amazon Top 20 Best Seller in Horror (Hellrider - #11)
- Winner, Tales from the Moonlit Path Halloween Contest
- Winner, Hot Summer Something Contest, fromtheasylum.com ("R-Factor")
- Runner Up, Desdomona Hard Boiled Sex Contest ("Slutty Dead Girl")
- Flash Fiction Contest Winner, sciencefictionfantasyhorror.com ("The Only Good Spider")
- Poetry Contest Winner, sciencefictionfantasyhorror.com ("Natural Selection)

== Novels ==
The Hidden, LVP Publications (2026)
Ragman, Flame Tree Press (2023)
The Wakening, Flame Tree Press (2022)
Sins of the Father, Flame Tree Press (2021)
The Changeling (Amazon Web Services) (2020)
Hellrider, Flame Tree Press (2019)
The Cure Amazon Web Services (originally Samhain Publishing) (2015)
The Burning Time Amazon Web Services (originally Journalstone Press) (2013)
Cemetery Club Amazon Web Services (originally Journalstone Press) (2012)
Ghosts of Coronado Bay Amazon Web Services (originally Journalstone Press) (2011)
Carnival of Fear Amazon Web Services (originally Graveside Books Publishing) (2010)

== Novellas and Collections ==
Novellas:
The Ghoul, Grendel Press (upcoming)
Of Gods and Monsters, LVP Publications (2026)
The Nightmare World, LVP Publications (2026)
The Nightmare People, LVP Publications (2025)
The Malthusian Correction, LVP Publication (2025)
When September Ends, Graveside Press (2025)
The Nightmare Man, LVP Publications (2024)
December Soul, in Houses of the Unholy, Cemetery Dance Publishing (2019)
Death Do Us Part, Amazon Web Services (originally Samhain Publishing) (2016)
Winterwood, Amazon Web Services (originally Samhain Publishing) (2015)
Cult of the Black Jaguar, Amazon Web Services (originally Samhain Publishing) (2015)
Legacy, Amazon Web Services (originally Samhain Publishing) (2014)
Castle by the Sea, Amazon Web Services (originally Samhain Publishing) (2014)
Thief of Souls, Amazon Web Services (originally Samhain Publishing) (2014)
Fatal Consequences, Amazon Web Services (originally Samhain Publishing) (2014)
The Cold Spot, Amazon Web Services (originally Delirium Publishing) (2012)
He Waits, Amazon Web Services (originally Delirium Publishing) (2012)

=== Collections ===
Songs in the Key of Death, (poetry collection), Lycan Valley Press (2023)
Houses of the Unholy, (short story collection), Cemetery Dance Publishing (2019)
12 Scares for Christmas, (holiday-themed short story collection), Amazon Web Services (2016)
7 Screams, (novella collection), Amazon Web Services (2016)
The Monster Inside, (short story collection), Amazon Web Services (2016)

== Short stories ==
"The Fires of Truth" (upcoming), Iron Fist, anthology from Nocturnicorn Books
"Eldritch Moon" (upcoming), Kosmos Obscura, anthology from Graveside Press
"The H-Train" (2026, reprint), Gavagai.com; Editor's Pick
"Devils in the Dark" (2026, reprint), Lesser Cryptids of Greater Appalachia; anthology from Brood XIV Books
"Still Life" (2025), The Writing on the Wall: A Horror Tribute to Iron Maiden, anthology from Wicked Ouija Press
"Hives" (2025), The Horror Zine Magazine Fall 2025, anthology from The Horror Zine
"Feral" (2025), Cemetery Dance
"Mezzamort" (2025), Gaba Ghoul, anthology from October Nights Press
"A Reversal of Fortunes" (2024), Nature Triumphs, anthology from Dark Moon Rising Publications
"Earworms" (2024), Book Worms, Rock and Roll Issue
"Devils in the Dark" (2024, reprint), The HorrorZine
"Extreme Makeover" (2024), No Sleep Podcast
"Planet of the Dead" (2024), Songs from the Void, anthology from Max Blood's Mausoleum
"AWOL" (2023), Book Worms
"A Muse, Shrouded" (2023), Dracula Beyond Stoker, Issue 3
"A Timeless Tragedy" (2023), Shakespeare Unleashed, anthology from Monstrous Books
"Yule Cat" (2022, reprint), Christmas Gothic Short Stories, anthology from Flame Tree Press
"Beautiful Monsters" (2022), Classic Monsters Unleashed, anthology from Crystal Lake Publishing
"Death & Life in a Small Town" (2022), Picnic in the Graveyard, anthology from Cemetery Gates Media
"Origin of the Species" (2022), The Horror Zine's Book of Werewolf Stories, anthology from Hellbound Books
"The Gods of War" (2021), SNAFU: Holy War, anthology from Cohesion Press
"Freedom for All" (2021), Under Twin Suns: Alternate Histories of the Yellow Sign, anthology from Hippocampus Press
"End of the Road" (2021, reprint), Horror Zine
"An Unexpected Gift" (2020), Christmas Lites X (charity anthology)
"What You Believe" (2020), The Pulp Horror Book of Phobias II, anthology from Lycan Valley Press
"Grave Secrets" (2020, reprint), Lovecraft Mythos New & Classic Collection, anthology from Flame Tree Publishing
"Home on the Range" (2020, reprint), Horror Zine
"Street Action" (2020), Survive with Me: A Charity Anthology, anthology from Alien Agenda Publishing
"Feed the Plow" (2020), Nameless Magazine
"13 Sparrows" (2019), Christmas Lites IX, (charity anthology)
"Blood Will Tell" (2019), New York State of Fright, anthology from Hippocampus Press
"Who Says You Can't Go Home" (2019), Welcome Home, anthology from Lycan Valley Press
"The Cemetery Man" (2019), The Pulp Horror Book of Phobias, anthology from Lycan Valley Press
"How Does Your Garden Grow" (2018), Death's Garden, anthology from Lycan Valley Press
"Zero Hour" (2018), C.H.U.D. Lives!, anthology from Crystal Lake Publishing
"Armageddon 2020" (2018), Christmas Lites VIII, charity anthology
"Destination Unknown" (2017), CEA Greatest Anthology Ever Written, anthology from Celenic Earth Publications
"Devils in the Dark" (2017), Hidden Animals: A Collection of Cryptid Fiction, anthology from Dragon's Roost Press
"Sacrifice" (2017), Christmas Lites VII, charity anthology
"Heroes Are Made" (2017), Halfway to Anywhere, anthology from Mirror Matter Press
"Where Have You Gone, David Mullins" (2017), Great Jones Street
"The H-Train" (2017), Horror Library 6; anthology from Cutting Block Books
"Peeping Tom" (2017), Worlds of Science Fiction/Horror/Fantasy Vol. 2
"Holly Jolly Christmas" (2016), Christmas Lites VI, charity anthology
"No Place Like Home" (2016), The Beauty of Death; anthology from Independent Legions Publishing
"Grave Secrets" (2016), Tales from the Lake vol. 4; anthology from Crystal Lake Publishing
"The Lazarus Effect" (2016), Cemetery Dance Magazine
"Things Forgotten" (2015) Real Dark, anthology from Blackwyrm Publishing
"A Christmas Tail" (2015), Christmas Lites V, charity anthology
"Foxhole" (2015) Death's Realm, anthology from Grey Matter Press
"Martial Law" (2014) Equilibrium Overturned, anthology from Grey Matter Press
"Homo Suicidus" (2014), A Darke Phantastique; anthology from Cycatrix Press
"The Wee Folk" (2013), Midnight Echo 9
"He Knows if You've Been Bad" (2013), Christmas Lites III, charity anthology
"Lonely is the Mothman" (2013), Dark Moon Digest YA Issue 1
"Them Ol' Negro Blues" (2013), Shadow Masters: An Anthology from the Horror Zine
"Anything for Love" (2013), The Uninvited Magazine
"Countdown" (2013), High Stakes
"Wishmaster 2000" (2013), Christmas Lites II, charity anthology
"The Great Zombie Invasion of 1979" (2012), Blood Lite III
"Sumpahump" (2012), Slices of Flesh
"Wishmaster 2000" (2012), Christmas Lites II
"Anything for Love" (2012), The Uninvited Magazine
"Jennifer's Body" (2012), Horror on the Installment Plan
"Lights of Las Vegas" (2012), My First Threesome
"True Love Never Die"s (2012), Horror on the Installment Plan
"Uninvited" (2011), 90 Minutes to Live
"Blood Will Tell" (2011), The Beast Within 2
"Ladies of the Lake" (2011), Legends of the Mountain State IV
"Tunnel of Love" (2011), Carnival of Fear – special limited edition
"Bitter Apples" (2011), White Cat Magazine
"Show & Tell" (2011), Fender Stitch Magazine
"Trick or Treat" (2011), Fender Stitch Magazine
"All Dead" (2010), Horror Library Vol. IV
"High Mileage" (2010), DailyScienceFiction.com
"Girls Night Out" (2010), Fang Bangers
"The Funhouse" (2009), Harvest Hill Anthology
"The Yule Cat" (2009), Appalachian Winter Hauntings
"Trapped" (2009), Legends of the Mountain State 3
"The Jesus Orchid" (2008), Shroud Magazine
"Experimental Subject" (2008), Bits of the Dead
"The Lesson" (2008), Wrong World
"Hybrids" (2008), Wrong World
"The Toll" (2008), Wrong World
"Bones" (2008, reprint), Cemetery Dance
"Windows to the Soul" (2008), Bound for Evil
"Family First" (2008), Dark Territories
"Guests in the Attic" (2007), MagusZine
"Rough Justice" (2007), Raw Meat
"Home on the Range" (2007), Loving the Undead
"Graduation" (2007), All Possible Worlds
"The Monster Inside" (2007), Edgeofpropinquity.com
"Interruptions" (2007), Withersin Magazine
"R-Factor (2006), From the Asylum
"The Key to Her Heart" (2006), Hellnotes.com
"Slutty Dead Girl" (2006), Desdmona.com
"Out of the Garden" (2006), LateLateShow.com
"The Midway" (2006), Tales From the Moonlit Path
"Bones" (2005), Doses of Death: A Macabre Collection of Small-Town Horror
"A Dog's Life" (2005), Animal Magnetism
"The Funhouse" (2005), Wicked Karnival
"Dreams of Darkness" (2005), Silent Whispers Monthly
"The Phantom Milkman" (2005), Haunted Encounters: Departed Family & Friends
"The Only Good Spider" (2005), ScienceFictionFantasyHorror.com
"Jacob" (2005), Whispering Spirits
"Crisis of Faith" (2005), Lost InTheDark.com

== Poetry ==
"Amyloid Lamentations" (2025), Horror Writers Association Poetry Showcase vol. XII
"The Parasite" (2017), Horror Writers Association Poetry Showcase vol. IV
"When The Carnival Comes to Town" (2013), The Horror Zine
"Against My Will" (2013), The Horror Zine
"The Doctor" (2013), The Horror Zine
"The Mushroom Garden" (2010), Death in Common: Poems From Unlikely Victims
"Blood Red, Corpse White" (2010), Death in Common: Poems From Unlikely Victims
"The Dentist" (2006), Wicked Karnival
"Natural Selection" (2005), sciencefictionfantasyhorror.com

== Nonfiction ==
"Classic Monsters," The HorrorZine, January 2025 Issue The Horror Zine (2025)
"Intro to Chronic Argonauts," Monstrous Magazine Vol. 2 Monstrous Books (2024)
Interview with R.L. Stine, Writers Workshop of Horror 2, Hydra Publications (2021)
Interview with Graham Masterton, Writers Workshop of Horror 2, Hydra Publications (2021)
"When Agatha Met Frank: Or, Meet the Parents," Butcher Knives & Body Parts (2011)
