= Margaret Becklake =

South African–Canadian respiratory physician and epidemiologist

Margaret Rigsby Becklake
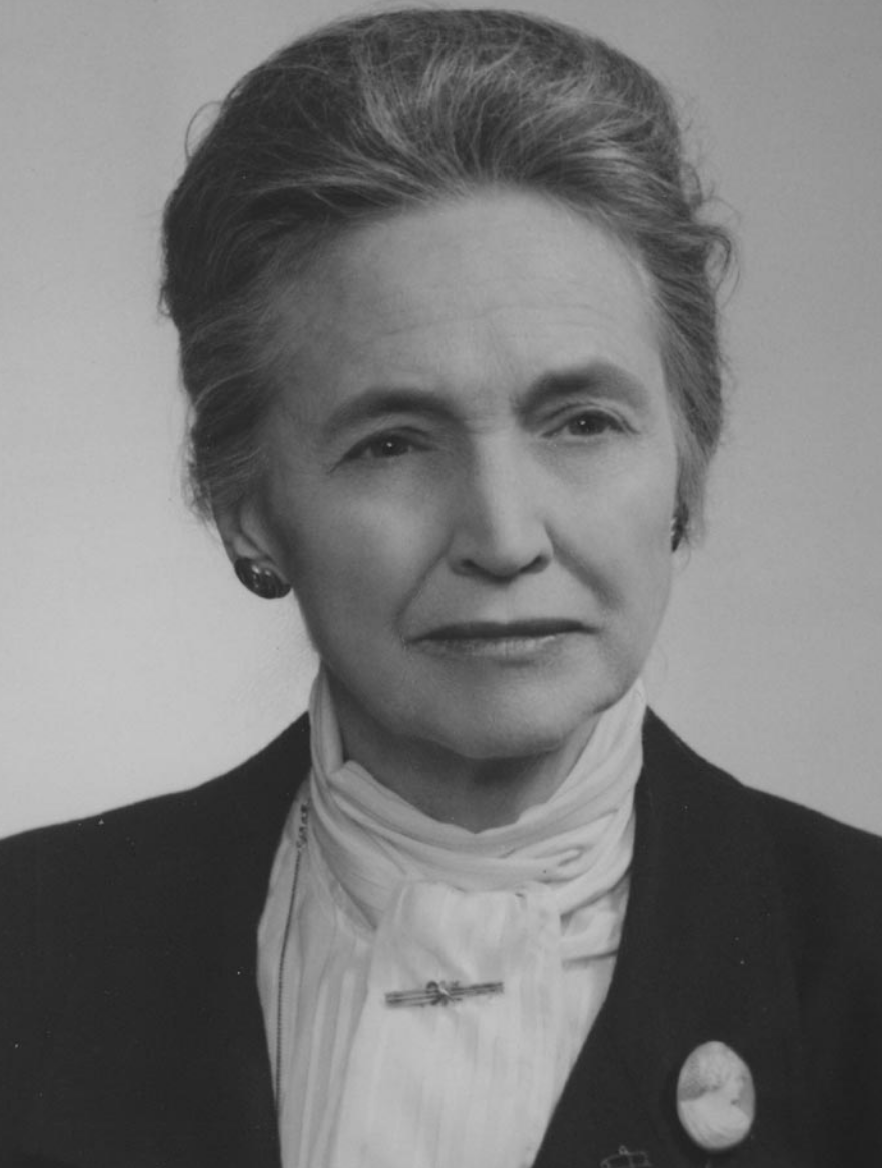
- Born: May 27, 1922; London, England
- Died: October 17, 2018 (aged 96); Montreal, Quebec, Canada
- Education: University of the Witwatersrand (MBBCh, MD)
- Known for: Research on occupational lung disease; respiratory epidemiology; training and mentorship
- Spouse: Maurice McGregor (m. 1949)
- Awards: Member of the Order of Canada (2007); Grand Officer of the National Order of Quebec (2011); Fellow of the Royal Society of Canada (1991); American Thoracic Society Distinguished Achievement Award (1997); ATS World Lung Health Award (2001); Union Medal, The Union (2006)
- Scientific career
- Fields: Respiratory medicine; Epidemiology; Occupational health
- Workplaces: University of the Witwatersrand; Royal Victoria Hospital (Montreal); McGill University; National Centre for Occupational Health (South Africa)

Margaret Rigsby Becklake (27 May 1922 – 17 October 2018) was a South African–Canadian physician, respiratory physiologist and epidemiologist whose research helped establish chronic airways disease (now categorized under chronic obstructive pulmonary disease) as an occupational lung disease caused by dust exposure, notably in mining and other industries. She was a longtime professor at McGill University who played a leading role in building research capacity in respiratory epidemiology in Canada, South Africa and internationally. She was appointed a Member of the Order of Canada in 2007 and a Grand Officer of the National Order of Quebec in 2011.

== Early life and education ==
Becklake was born in London, England, on 27 May 1922, and moved in infancy to South Africa, where she was raised in Pretoria. She entered the University of the Witwatersrand (Wits) at age 16 and graduated MBBCh in 1944, later completing an MD (research doctorate) in 1951 with early publications in respiratory physiology.

== Career ==
=== South Africa (1940s–1957) ===
After internship and training in the UK, Becklake returned to Wits as a junior lecturer and, in 1954, became a physiologist at the Miners' Pneumoconiosis Bureau in Johannesburg, where she established a lung function laboratory. Her studies in gold miners provided influential evidence that chronic exposure to mine dust causes chronic airways disease, broadening occupational compensation (previously focused on silicosis) and reshaping understanding of chronic obstructive pulmonary disease as not solely linked to smoking.

Becklake married cardiologist Maurice McGregor in 1949, and together they opposed South Africa's apartheid regime. In the 1950s they would drive Black township residents into Johannesburg so they could reach work—an act that risked being stopped and charged by police for carrying Black passengers. When McGill University offered McGregor a post, the couple emigrated to Montreal with their two young children in 1957.

=== Canada and international work (1957–2000s) ===
In Montreal, Becklake joined the Royal Victoria Hospital and McGill University, progressing to full professorships in Medicine/Experimental Medicine and in Epidemiology, Biostatistics and Occupational Health. She broadened her work to occupational and environmental lung disease in Canada, including studies of asbestos workers in Quebec, air pollution, and childhood asthma; she also published on sex and gender differences in airway behaviour across the life span.

From 1968 to 1993 she held continuous support as a Career Investigator of the Medical Research Council of Canada. In 1978–79 she served as president of the Canadian Thoracic Society, among the first women to hold the role. During a sabbatical in 1984–85 she returned to South Africa to head the Epidemiology Unit at the National Centre for Occupational Health in Johannesburg, mentoring a new generation of occupational-health researchers and strengthening regional capacity in respiratory epidemiology.

A dedicated educator, Becklake co-founded international training initiatives in respiratory epidemiology (under the International Union Against Tuberculosis and Lung Disease) and created McGill's Summer Program in Epidemiology and Biostatistics (1987–2003), which drew trainees worldwide, including many from low- and middle-income countries.

== Research and contributions ==
Across more than six decades, Becklake authored or co-authored hundreds of papers spanning occupational dust exposure (silica and asbestos), chronic obstructive pulmonary disease, air pollution, smoking, childhood and adolescent asthma, and health inequalities. Her work helped establish that long-term dust exposure can cause chronic airways disease independent of smoking; she also foregrounded sex and gender differences in airway physiology and championed rigorous, question-driven epidemiologic methods.

== Honours and recognition ==
Becklake was elected a Fellow of the Royal Society of Canada (1991). She received the American Thoracic Society Distinguished Achievement Award (1997) and World Lung Health Award (2001), the Union Medal from the International Union Against Tuberculosis and Lung Disease (2006), and an honorary MD from the University of the Witwatersrand (1974). She was appointed a Member of the Order of Canada in 2007 and named a Grand Officer of the National Order of Quebec in 2011.

== Personal life and death ==
Becklake and her husband Maurice McGregor had two children. Throughout her life, she championed women's role in science and medicine, often advocating for female students and physicians. As one of the first women specialists in both epidemiology and respiratory medicine, she had broken significant barriers in these fields.

She died in Montreal on 17 October 2018, aged 96.

== Legacy ==
Becklake is widely credited with helping to define occupational chronic airways disease as a distinct medical condition and with training and mentoring generations of clinicians and researchers in respiratory epidemiology. In 2018, the Montreal Chest Institute Foundation established the Margaret Becklake Fellowship in Respiratory Research to support trainees from low- and middle-income countries and from Indigenous communities.

== See also ==
- Occupational lung disease
- Respiratory epidemiology
- Chronic obstructive pulmonary disease
