= Kids (1970s magazine) =

American children's magazine

- Issue number 20
- Categories: Children's magazine
- Frequency: Monthly
- Founder: Jenette Kahn; Jim Robinson
- Founded: 1970
- First issue: November 1970; 56 years ago
- Final issue: 1975
- Country: United States
- Based in: New York City
- Language: English
- ISSN: 0023-1312

Kids was a children's magazine published in Cambridge, Massachusetts and later New York City from 1970 to 1975. Its aim was to create a magazine which was, as much as possible, created and edited by children themselves, with minimal adult supervision. The magazine folded in 1975, due to debt incurred by the founding editors and publishers.

== Background and history ==
The magazine's founding editors were Jenette Kahn and Jim Robinson, who were both Harvard University alumni. Robinson was a former fifth-grade teacher, and Kahn was a freelance art critic. Robinson used to bring a hand press to his classroom and let his students set and print their own stories and poems. Noticing that the kids were enthralled with publishing their own work, he decided to do it on a bigger scale. Kahn recalls that it was Robinson's idea to print a series of books called Young Words and Pictures that would be entirely written and illustrated by kids for each other.

Kahn reminded him that each time they had to publish a book, there were costs associated with promoting and marketing it. Instead, she proposed a magazine "with surprises to keep it fresh and with ongoing features", which children could look forward to, and then there would be a "built-in audience". The pair convinced two Boston businessmen, Charlie Rheault and Steve Alpert, to assist them with the start-up costs, which they accomplished by arranging a $15,000 loan from a Boston bank. Rheault and Alpert knew a printer in Lowell, Massachusetts, Dale Bowman, who agreed to publish the magazine on credit for them.

External image
- via Newsday
- Cover of first issue

The first issue debuted in November 1970, contained 48 pages, was devoid of any advertisements, and cost 50 cents. Its inaugural printing was 60,000 copies, and included poems, plays, stories, photographs, and drawings submitted by children, who were paid $6.00 if their work ended up being published. Their pictures were included as well. The magazine was published ten times per year, with one issue published in the summer.

For each issue, two children were selected as editors who could veto any item published in the magazine. Kids' first guest editors, 10-year-old Marc Alonso and 12-year-old Candace Lowe, were featured on the David Frost Show.

In 1972, the Associated Press reported that the magazine had a circulation of 120,000 copies. That same year, LI Magazine, published by Newsday for the Long Island community, recruited editors from Kids to help them publish their magazine by letting the children choose content, including writing articles, creating illustrations and hand lettering for their publication.

Members who sat on the advisory board for the publication included Dr. Robert Coles from Harvard University; John Holt, author of How Children Fail; Stephen M. Joseph, teacher and book editor; poet Kenneth Koch; Jonathan Kozol, known for his books on public education in the United States; and Betty Blayton of The Children's Art Carnival in Harlem.

According to a note inserted into the magazine with the first issue, Kids evolved from several ideas:

First, that children have something to say that is worth listening to. Second, that kids are eager to learn from each other and should be provided a medium for the exchange of their feelings and their thoughts. Third, that few things inspire children to pursue their own creative projects as much as seeing and enjoying other children's work.

Kahn and Robinson sold the magazine after 16 issues, due to the debt they incurred while publishing it. Kahn went on to create a second magazine aimed at children titled Dynamite! from Scholastic Press, which had some similarities to Kids. When that periodical folded, she created a third magazine called Smash, a pop-culture magazine for kids published by Xerox Education. Eventually she became president and editor-in-chief of DC Comics and MAD Magazine.

== Reception ==
When the first issue of Kids came out, the editors of a newspaper titled Hoot Owl, published in Arlington, Texas, were upset. They claimed that they were the first to have kids as editors, and that Kids was "not an original idea". They pointed to the similarity of each of their mottos, with Kids' motto being "By children for each other", and Hoot Owl's motto being "By kids, for kids, about kids". Time magazine opined that "Hoot Owl appears to be a bit jealous, because it has been struggling for five hard months with next to no recognition, while Kids gained national attention in only one month". Time went on to say that the first issue of Kids was "printed on good quality paper with plenty of color illustrations [and] was fresh, funny and full of juvenile reflections of an adult world".

The Washington Post said the "real charm of this magazine is not its relevancy, but its spontaneity. It is a magazine with the unexpected on every page. If it were written by adults it would be called creative. Written by children, it is much closer to natural expression". Los Angeles Times book review editor Digby Diehl wrote that when he first heard about the magazine, he "distrustfully ignored it, having endured all too many cute manipulations of children from Soupy Sales to Art Linkletter". After seeing a copy of a summer issue, he reported that he was "intrigued to discover that the magazine is a genuine attempt to capture some of the imaginative flair and fantasy of childhood in a relatively uncontaminated form". Diehl went on to praise it even further, highlighting the "spontaneity of ideas and expressions", and that overall, the magazine was a "delightful fresh breeze in the stale world of TV animations and dull textbooks".

== Notable contributors ==
The magazine's illustrators included twelve-year-old Ray Billingsley, who went on to create the syndicated newspaper comic Curtis; Jim Salicrup, who was editor for Marvel Comics in the 1980s; and Tom Gammill, who later wrote and produced for The Simpsons and Seinfeld.

== See also ==
- Stone Soup magazine
- List of defunct American magazines
