= Steenz =

American cartoonist

Christina "Steenz" Stewart
- Born: Christina Stewart; 1990 (age 35–36) Detroit, MI
- Areas: Cartoonist, Editor, Illustrator, Educator
- Pseudonym: Steenz
- Notable works: Heart of the City; Archival Quality
- Awards: Dwayne McDuffie Award, 2019 (with Ivy Noelle Weir)

Christina "Steenz" Stewart is an American cartoonist and editor known for illustrating Archival Quality and currently authoring and illustrating the daily comic strip Heart of the City. They were born September 29, 1990, in Detroit, Michigan, and currently reside in St. Louis, Missouri. Upon taking over Heart of the City from Mark Tatulli in May 2020, they became the second nationally syndicated black nonbinary cartoonist, preceded in this distinction by Bianca Xunise only a month prior.

== Early life ==
Growing up in St. Louis, Steenz was a fan of comics and cartoons that later influenced their work, including Calvin and Hobbes, Cathy, Curtis, Recess, Hey Arnold!, and Doug. They attended Maryville University and studied studio art with a focus on illustration. They left as a junior and worked as a librarian and a comic book shop manager at the Eisner-winning Star Clipper Comics in St. Louis until its closing in 2015. While managing the comic book shop they decided to make comics, but didn't pursue them as a career until being exposed to Brittany Williams' work on a Samurai Jack comic: "The second I saw [Williams'] name on [the comic] … I was like, 'Wait a second; she's a black woman, she's making comics — I can do that too,' and finally it kind of clicked for me too."

== Career ==
Following Star Clipper's closing in 2015, Steenz went on to work as an editor at Lion Forge Comics, where they worked on the first 12 issues of the comics and tabletop gaming magazine Rolled and Told until 2019.

Steenz contributed the short comic "The Update" along with letterer Melanie Ujimori to editor Taneka Stotts' Eisner- and Ignatz-winning Elements: Fire, and has also appeared in the anthologies Mine! and Dead Beats.

Their first major publication was Archival Quality, which they co-created with writer Ivy Noelle Weir. It was published by Oni Press in 2018.

Steenz took over writing and illustrating Heart of the City for Mark Tatulli. Their first strip syndicated via Andrews McMeel appeared on May 24, 2020.

On May 12, 2020, it was announced that Steenz would be illustrating and co-creating a graphic novel about the history of tabletop RPGs alongside writer Samuel Sattin; the book is estimated for a 2023 release date.

In July 2022, Steenz alleged on social media that Oni Press was not paying creators their royalties. The Beat reported that "Steenz is the artist on the award winning OGN Archival Quality, published by Oni back in 2018. Several Oni creators responded to her tweets with their own complaints". Oni Press did not respond to Bleeding Cool's request for comment.

On October 8, 2024, Steenz and writer Samuel Sattin's graphic novel on the history of tabletop roleplaying games, Side Quest: A Visual History of Roleplaying Games, came out in bookstores. Published by Versify/HarperCollins.

== Selected works ==
Archival Quality (2018) – Cel Walden starts a new job as an archivist at the Logan Museum. As she struggles with depression and anxiety, she dreams about a ghostly woman. As she learns more about the ghost who haunts her dreams, she learns more about herself and the other employees of the Logan Museum.

Heart of the City (2020–present) – The comic is about Heart Lamarr, a middle-school student who lives in Philadelphia. Stories focus on Heart's relations with her friends and family, as well as her school life and experiences with popular culture. Steenz took over the strip after original creator Mark Tatulli stepped down.

== Recognition and awards ==
Elements: Fire, A Comic Anthology by Creators of Color won the 2018 Eisner Award for Best Anthology and the 2017 Ignatz Award for Best Anthology. The anthology contains work by Steenz.

In February 2019, Steenz and Ivy Noelle Weir were named winners of the 5th Annual Dwayne McDuffie Award for Diversity in Comics for Archival Quality. The book was also selected as a Junior Library Guild Gold Standard publication in 2018.

In 2021, Steenz and reporter Aaron Miguel Cantú won the 2021 Media for a Just Society Award in the journalism category for their comic, written by Cantú and drawn by Steenz, When Innocent Until Proven Guilty Costs $400 a Month—and Your Freedom. This comic was created in partnership with the Bail Project and originally posted by Vice on May 28, 2020.

== Bibliography ==
- Mine: A Planned Parenthood Benefit Anthology, ComicMix, 2017
- Archival Quality (with Ivy Noelle Weir), Oni Press, 2018
- Rolled & Told issues #1-#12 (Editor), 2018, 2019
- Dead Beats, A Wave Blue World Anthology, 2019
- Heart of the City, Andrews McMeel Syndication, 2020

=== Self-published ===
- Encyclopedia Brown and the Case of the Muscle Maker Fan Comic, Gumroad, 2019
- Receiving Transmissions, Gumroad, 2019
