= Andrew Halayko =

Andrew John Halayko is Professor of Physiology and Pathophysiology, and a Tier 1 Canada Research Chair in Lung Pathobiology and Treatment at the University of Manitoba.

He is the Editor-in-Chief of the American Journal of Respiratory Cell and Molecular Biology.

He was President of the Canadian Thoracic Society from 2016 to 2017.

He has an h-index of 66 according to Semantic Scholar.
