= John Hansen-Flaschen =

American pulmonologist and academic

- Born: John Flaschen
- Education: Brown University; New York University School of Medicine
- Occupations: Pulmonologist, critical care physician, medical educator
- Years active: 1980–2019
- Employer: University of Pennsylvania
- Known for: Founding editor-in-chief of Annals of the American Thoracic Society
- Awards: American Thoracic Society Distinguished Achievement Award (2019)
- Medical career
- Profession: Physician
- Field: Pulmonology, Critical care medicine
- Institutions: Perelman School of Medicine at the University of Pennsylvania

John Hansen-Flaschen is an American pulmonologist, critical care physician, and medical educator. He is an emeritus professor of medicine at the Perelman School of Medicine at the University of Pennsylvania. His work has focused on pulmonary and critical care medicine, chronic respiratory failure, and palliative care for patients with advanced lung disease. He served as chief of Penn’s pulmonary and critical care division and was the founding editor-in-chief of the Annals of the American Thoracic Society.

== Early life and education ==
Hansen-Flaschen was born John Flaschen. He earned an A.B. in chemistry from Brown University in 1972 and received his M.D. from the New York University School of Medicine in 1976. He completed his internship, residency, chief residency, and pulmonary medicine fellowship at the Hospital of the University of Pennsylvania.

== Career ==
Hansen-Flaschen joined the faculty of the University of Pennsylvania in 1980 and was appointed professor of medicine before becoming the Paul F. Harron Jr. Family Professor of Medicine in 2012. He became emeritus professor in 2019.

His clinical and academic work has focused on pulmonary and critical care medicine, chronic respiratory failure, and palliative care for patients with advanced lung disease.

From 1991 to 2014, he served as chief of the University's Division of Pulmonary and Critical Care Medicine, overseeing its clinical, educational, and research programs. He also chaired the Hospital of the University of Pennsylvania Ethics Committee and served as president of the University's Medical Faculty Senate.

In 2008, with the benefit of major gifts from surviving family members of Paul F. Harron, Hansen-Flaschen founded the Paul F. Harron Jr. Lung Center at Penn Medicine in 2008 and later established the Jay and Randy Fishman Program for Home Assisted Ventilation, which provides multidisciplinary care for adults with chronic respiratory failure. The center provides care for patients with lung disease and supports clinical education and research in pulmonary medicine.

In 2012, he became editor-in-chief of the Proceedings of the American Thoracic Society. He oversaw the journal's transition to the Annals of the American Thoracic Society, serving as its founding editor-in-chief until 2017.

In 2017, Hansen-Flaschen founded the Jay and Randy Fishman Program for Home Assisted Ventilation at Penn Medicine.

== Awards and honors ==
Hansen-Flaschen received the Distinguished Achievement Award from the American Thoracic Society in 2019. He also received the Inaugural Clinical Educator Award from the American Thoracic Society Clinical Problems Assembly in 2004, the Praxis Award in Professional Ethics from Villanova University in 2008, and the Leonard P. Lang Award from the American Lung Association of Delaware in 2017.

He also received the Christian R. and Mary F. Lindback Distinguished Teaching Award, the Donna McCurdy Teaching Award, the Robert Dunning Dripps Teaching Award, the Leonard Tow Award for Humanism in Medicine, and the Radhika Srinivasan Award for Humanism and Professionalism at the University of Pennsylvania.

He is a fellow of the American College of Physicians, the American College of Chest Physicians, the American Thoracic Society, and the College of Physicians of Philadelphia.

== Selected publications ==
- Hansen-Flaschen, JH; Brazinsky, S; Basile, C; Lanken, PN (1991). "Use of sedating drugs and neuromuscular blocking agents in patients requiring mechanical ventilation for respiratory failure. A national survey". JAMA. 266 (20): 2870–2875. doi:10.1001/jama.1991.03470200082040. PMID 1942456.
- Halpern, SD; Hansen-Flaschen, J (2006). "Terminal withdrawal of life-sustaining supplemental oxygen". JAMA. 296 (11): 1397–1400. doi:10.1001/jama.296.11.1397. PMID 16985234.
- Lanken, PN; Terry, PB; Delisser, HM (2008). "An official American Thoracic Society clinical policy statement: palliative care for patients with respiratory diseases and critical illnesses". American Journal of Respiratory and Critical Care Medicine. 177 (8): 912–927. doi:10.1164/rccm.200605-587ST. PMID 18390964.
- Mahler, DA; Selecky PA; Harrod CG (2010). "American College of Chest Physicians consensus statement on the management of dyspnea in patients with advanced lung or heart disease". Chest. 137 (3): 674–691. doi:10.1378/chest.09-1543. PMID 20202949.
- Kerlin, MP; Small DS; Cooney E (2013-06-06). "A randomized trial of nighttime physician staffing in an intensive care unit". The New England Journal of Medicine. 368 (23): 2201–2209. doi:10.1136/gutjnl-2013-304713. PMID 23697473.
- Johnson, MJ; Yorke, J; Hansen-Flaschen, J (2017). "Towards an expert consensus to delineate a clinical syndrome of chronic breathlessness" (PDF). European Respiratory Journal. 49 (5): 1602277. doi:10.1183/13993003.02277-2016. PMID 28546269.
- Hansen-Flaschen, J (2021). "Respiratory care for patients with amyotrophic lateral sclerosis in the US: in need of support". JAMA Neurology. 78 (9): 1047–1048. doi:10.1001/jamaneurol.2021.2400. PMID 34338729.
- Hansen-Flaschen, J; Ackrivo, J (2023). "Practical guide to management of long-term noninvasive ventilation for adults with chronic neuromuscular disease". Respiratory Care. 68 (8): 1123–1157. doi:10.4187/respcare.10349. PMC 10353174. PMID 36922023.
- Cao, M; Katz SL; Hansen-Flaschen J (2024). "Roadmap for advancing a new subspecialty in pulmonary medicine devoted to chronic respiratory failure". Annals of the American Thoracic Society. 21 (5): 692–695. doi:10.2214/AJR.23.30706. PMID 38170830.
