= Ray Billingsley =

American cartoonist (born 1957)

- Born: July 25, 1957 (age 69) Wake Forest, North Carolina, United States
- Area: Cartoonist
- Notable works: Curtis comic strip (1988-present)
- Awards: Reuben Award for Cartoonist of the Year (2020); Inkpot Award (2014)

Raymond Curtis Billingsley (born July 25, 1957) is an African American cartoonist, best known for creating the comic strip Curtis. It is distributed by King Features Syndicate and printed in more than 250 newspapers nationwide.

== Early life ==
Billingsley was born in Wake Forest, North Carolina, and raised there in his earliest years. Later, his family moved to Harlem, in New York City.

He credits sibling rivalry with sparking his initial fascination with cartooning. As a young boy, he learned to draw in order to emulate his older brother, who studied fine arts.

== Career ==
Billingsley contributed early cartoons to Kids, a magazine "by kids for kids" published in Cambridge, Massachusetts and then in New York City, from 1970 to 1975 under the co-editorship of Jenette Kahn (later president and editor-in-chief of MAD Magazine and DC Comics).

After graduating from the High School of Music and Art in Manhattan, he attended the School of Visual Arts on a four-year scholarship. After graduating in 1979, he began an internship at Walt Disney Studios.

Billingsley drew a nationally syndicated strip called Lookin' Fine from 1979 to 1982. The strip featured an all Black cast in their 20s, but Billingsley didn't have much creative freedom with the strip and left after two years. By 1988, he was freelancing in advertising and public relations; doing television commercials, posters and animation; and working for magazines such as Ebony. In October of that year, King Features Syndicate introduced Curtis.

Billingsley credits African American cartoonist Morrie Turner, creator of Wee Pals — the first American syndicated strip with an integrated cast of characters — with opening the door for Curtis and other strips. He also credits Will Eisner, creator of The Spirit, for encouraging Billingsley to stretch out artistically. "He always told me to reach out and do more than I thought I could. I continually draw strength when I relive his teachings," said Billingsley.

=== Awards ===
Billingsley has received several awards, including the President's Award in 2000, during a conference between the American Lung Association and the Canadian Lung Association in Toronto, Canada. In addition, Billingsley received the Humanitarian Award from the American Lung Association of Southeast Florida in 1999. He was awarded the Inkpot Award in 2014. Billingsley's most prestigious recognition came when he was awarded the 2020 Reuben Award by the National Cartoonists Society, placing him in the company of great cartoonists such as Charles Schulz, Garry Trudeau, Jerry Scott, and Roz Chast. He is the first Black creator to receive the peer-voted award.
