= Annals of the American Thoracic Society =

- Discipline: Pulmonology
- Language: English
- Edited by: Christopher Goss

Publication details
- Former name: Proceedings of the American Thoracic Society
- History: 2004–present
- Publisher: American Thoracic Society (United States)
- Frequency: Monthly
- Impact factor: 5.4 (2024)

Standard abbreviations
- ISO 4: Ann. Am. Thorac. Soc.

Indexing
- CODEN: PATSBB
- ISSN: 1943-5665 (print); 2325-6621 (web)
- LCCN: 2003215606
- OCLC no.: 55048285

Links
- Journal homepage; Online access; Online archive

The Annals of the American Thoracic Society is an official medical journal of the American Thoracic Society (ATS). It publishes original clinical and epidemiological research in the fields of pulmonology, critical care medicine, and sleep medicine. Known colloquially as the "White Journal", the Annals of the American Thoracic Society is one of four journals published by the American Thoracic Society, along with the American Journal of Respiratory and Critical Care Medicine ("Blue Journal"), American Journal of Respiratory Cell and Molecular Biology ("Red Journal"), and ATS Scholar.

== Contents ==
The Annals of the American Thoracic Society is a peer-reviewed medical journal that publishes clinical trials and original scientific research related to adult and pediatric pulmonary and respiratory sleep medicine, as well as adult critical care medicine, that is applicable to clinical practice, the formative and continuing education of clinical specialists, and the advancement of public health. With a focus on clinical practice, the journal features original research articles, brief communications, focused reviews, perspectives, opinions and ideas, and NIH workshop reports.

Since 2013, the journal has produced a monthly podcast in which clinicians and contributing authors to the Annals of the American Thoracic Society discuss a range of topics pertaining to pulmonary, critical care, and sleep medicine in order to help research findings reach a wider audience.

According to the Journal Citation Reports, the journal has a 2024 impact factor of 5.4.

== History ==
The journal was established in 2004 as the Proceedings of the American Thoracic Society and adopted its current name in 2013. The editor-in-chief was Alan R. Leff (University of Chicago Medical Center). He was succeeded in 2012 by John Hansen-Flaschen (University of Pennsylvania). David J. Lederer (Columbia University Medical Center) became the third editor-in-chief on April 1, 2017. Colin Cooke (University of Michigan) assumed the interim editor-in-chief role on June 27, 2019, and on January 22, 2020, was named the editor-in-chief for a 5-year term. Christopher Goss (University of Washington) has been named the new editor-in-chief, starting January 23, 2026 for a 5-year term. The journal is published online.

== Abstracting and Indexing ==
The journal is abstracted and indexed in Index Medicus, MEDLINE, PubMed, Chemical Abstracts, Scopus, and the Science Citation Index Expanded.
