= Gina Lovasi =

- Born: May 1980 (age 46); Wyoming, US

Academic background
- Education: BS, Ecology, 2001, University of California, Los Angeles; MPH, 2003, PhD, Epidemiology, 2006, University of Washington
- Thesis: Neighborhood walkability, physical activity and cardiovascular risk (2006)
- Website: drexel.edu/dornsife/academics/faculty/Gina%20Lovasi/

Gina Danielle Schellenbaum Lovasi (born May 1980) is the Dean of the Dornsife School of Public Health at Drexel University. She has authored more than 140 peer-reviewed articles and co-edited the book Urban Public Health: A Research Toolkit for Practice and Impact.

== Early life and education ==
Lovasi was born Gina Danielle Schellenbaum in May 1980 in Wyoming, US. She completed her Bachelor of Science degree in Ecology, Behavior and Evolution, at the University of California, Los Angeles in 2001, before enrolling at the University of Washington for her Master's degree and PhD. Upon completing her PhD, she became a Robert Wood Johnson Foundation Health and Society Scholar at Columbia University. In this role, she studied geographic and social determinants of health, built environments and health behavior, and cardiovascular and respiratory epidemiology. In 2008, Lovasi and her research team found that neighborhoods with more trees significantly reduced the risk of asthma in its residents. The hypothesis was that the trees might have a beneficial effect on air quality. She later received the Bates award for Promising Investigation in the Field of Environmental and Occupational Health from the American Thoracic Society for her asthma research.

== Career ==
=== Columbia University ===
Upon completing her post-doctoral fellowship in 2009, Lovasi joined the Department of Epidemiology as an assistant professor at the Columbia Center for Children’s Environmental Health. In her first year at Columbia, Lovasi was awarded a travel grant from GlaxoSmithKline for her project "Environmental Tobacco Smoke Exposure in Childhood Predicts Early Emphysema in Adulthood: The MESA Lung Study". From 2009 until 2011, Lovasi was the Career Development Investigator of the Columbia Center for Children’s Environmental Health. In this role, she studied the effects of prenatal polycyclic aromatic hydrocarbon (PAH) exposure on IQ, taking into account neighborhood level socio-economic and environmental conditions. At the Columbia Center for Children’s Environmental Health, she led the "Chlorpyrifos Exposure and Urban Residential Environment Characteristics as Determinants of Early Childhood Neurodevelopment" study which found that exposure to the pesticide chlorpyrifos could be associated with early childhood developmental delays. In order to come to this conclusion, her research team examined the association between exposure to the pesticide and mental and physical impairments in children in low-income areas of New York City neighborhoods.

In 2011, Lovasi and epidemiologist Ryan Demmer were named co-director of the Epidemiology and Population Health Summer Institute at Columbia University (EPIC). In its first year, the program attracted 130 student participants for courses focusing on the epidemiology and public health, skills for conducting or analyzing data, and subject matter domains such as diabetes. During the 2013–14 academic year, Lovasi was the recipient of a Calderone Award for her project "Neighborhood Commercial Resources and Sudden Cardiac Arrest." She was also named to a Charter Member of First American Institute of Architects Design and Health Research Consortium. In August 2014, Lovasi and her research team found that the size and cleanliness of a neighborhood park has a strong association to the body mass index. She was also invited by the New York Restoration Project to join The Haven Project which aims to "renovate a network of open spaces in the Mott Haven and Port Morris neighborhoods." As an assistant professor of Epidemiology, she received a grant from the National Institute on Aging for her project "Communities Designed to Support Cardiovascular Health for Older Adults."

=== Drexel University ===
In September 2016, Lovasi left Columbia to become the Dornsife Associate Professor of Urban Health and Co-Director of the Urban Health Collaborative at Drexel University. As the Co-Director of the Urban Health Collaborative, Lovasi worked closely with lead investigators from North Carolina State University to extend their park data collection to New York City. They examined whether weekday park usage and physical activity differed by race and ethnicity across numerous categories of park features. During the COVID-19 pandemic, she co-edited the book Urban Public Health: A Research Toolkit for Practice and Impact.
