= Heart of the City (comic strip) =

American comic strip

- Heart Lamarr (L) and Addy Lamarr (R), as they appeared during Tatulli's tenure on the strip
- Author(s): Mark Tatulli (1998–2020); Steenz (2020–present)
- Website: www.gocomics.com/heartofthecity
- Current status/schedule: Current daily strip
- Launch date: November 23, 1998
- Syndicate(s): Andrews McMeel Syndication
- Publisher: Andrews McMeel Publishing

Heart of the City is a comic strip created by Mark Tatulli and currently drawn by Christina "Steenz" Stewart that began syndication by Universal Press Syndicate (now doing business as Andrews McMeel Syndication) on November 23, 1998.

The strip centers on a young girl, named Heart, who lives in Philadelphia.

== Characters ==
- Heart Lamarr: Heart is the precocious and somewhat egotistical title character of the comic. In Tatulli's strips, Heart's primary characteristic is her obsession with all things Hollywood and celebrity fads. In Steenz's strips, her interests focus more on theatre and acting. In the first 20 years of the strip, her main goal in life is to be a mega-star before hitting the teenage years, a goal which is continuously thwarted by the combined forces of reality and her mother. Her goals eventually shifted to becoming a writer (during the final years of Tatulli's run) and later to becoming an actress (during Steenz's run). She is good friends with Kat and Dean but is nevertheless not immune to conflicts with them, which are often driven (especially during Tatulli's tenure) by her jealousy (in the case of Kat) or disdain towards geek culture (in the case of Dean); these conflicts occur less frequently in Steenz's version of the strip. She takes obsessive interest in various different media sensations throughout Tatulli's run, such as The Jonas Brothers in the 2000s and One Direction in the 2010s. Heart got her unusual first name from a poem given by a nurse to Heart's mom shortly after she was born: "A mother holds her child's hand for a while ... her heart forever."
- Dean Tatulli: Heart's "boyfriend," the term she uses to describe him (though Dean does not appear to think they are a couple, he does reciprocate her feelings of affection). A typical young boy who is obsessed with various franchises, chief among them being Star Wars and The Lord of the Rings. He is often seen dressing up in costumes as various characters from his favorite movies and acting out random scenes, occasionally with Heart's help. His last name was only declared to be "Tatulli" after Steenz took over the strip.
- Addy Lamarr: Heart's mom, a single mother constantly struggling to hold on to sanity. She is often seen struggling to pay bills while balancing her career with her time with Heart. Addy had wanted to be involved in film production, a dream job she sacrificed after her whirlwind marriage and the birth of Heart. Addy was seen working at an unnamed office job in the early strips, but was fired due to changes in the company, forcing her to hunt for a new job. She now works at a memorabilia auction house, a job she enjoys but finds aggravating at points due to Heart's insistence at being involved in every sort of celebrity event the auction house hosts. Her favorite movie is White Christmas.
- Mrs. Carmela Angelini: An elderly woman who lives in the same apartment building as the Lamarrs. She is often seen baby-sitting Heart when Addy works. Mrs. Angelini is a fan of opera and frequently cooks typical Italian meals. Mrs. Angelini will often tell stories of her childhood in Boston to make Heart realize an important moral lesson. These stories are usually in sharp contrast to Heart's materialistic views, occasionally causing Heart to miss the point of them at first. Mrs. Angelini is a widow, her husband having fought in the Korean War and losing a leg due to injuries sustained in fighting. The Angelinis apparently had 5 children together, none of whom have been introduced in the comic thus far.
- Kat: Heart's best friend, shares a lot of the same interests. Appears to be somewhat more level-headed than Heart. In Steenz’s strips, Kat is revealed to be lesbian, and in love with a girl called Lee.
- Spock: Dean's pet cat, found in an alley outside their apartment complex. Named after the Star Trek character Spock, "because of (the cat's) pointy ears" according to Dean. Frequently interrupts Dean's homework by sitting on the papers. Also seems to have a serious addiction to catnip.
- Richard: Dean's friend, who is similar to Dean, though is very timid. Usually appears with glasses and always speaks with a lisp due to his retainer. An unusually good bowler.
- Brent: Another of Dean's friends, appears in the same class as Heart & Dean. His life's ambition is to be a news anchor. His idol is Chris Matthews.
- Anu: Another of Dean's friends, a computer whiz whose parents are from India.
- Mimi: A young French girl from Heart's dance class, also attends the same school as Heart, Kat & Dean. Often acts as a rival (albeit an unknowing one) for Dean's affections, which infuriates Heart.
- Miss Lacey: A professional ballet dancer who runs the dance school that Heart and Kat attend.
- Officer Mario: A police officer whose beat frequently brings him into contact with Heart's actions. Some strips have hinted at a romance between him and Mrs. Angelini.
- The Spumanti Brothers: The neighborhood bullies, two older boys who frequently antagonize Heart and her friends. They participated against Heart's team in a Winter Olympics that Heart and her friends made up, but were taken home by their mother, thus, their team had to forfeit. They are easily intimidated by Mrs. Angelini.
- Angela Scaramuzzi: Mrs. Angelini's childhood rival, frequently appearing during flashback storylines but has appeared once (as a nun) in the real world. Hates Mrs. Angelini due to an incident involving a boy who was engaged to Angela but loved Carmela. Angela has refused to let go of her hatred even after fifty years.
- Antonio Gallo: Heart's father, who was only seen from behind once in the Tatulli version and referred to by his stage name of Antonio Gallo. He left Addy just after Heart was born. An actor, and perhaps the source of Heart's obsession with the theater, he was last known to be playing a one-man show about the life of Walt Disney. He reappears in Heart's life in the Steenz version.
- Alicia: A rival of Heart's, she made an appearance in a 2014 summer arc, where she competed with Heart for roles in their theater camp's production of Frozen. They had to work together to get their desired roles, but Heart got Elsa's mom and a troll, while Alicia got understudy to Anna (played by Kat) and "snowflake #7". She later led a protest against the unwanted roles.
- Charlotte: A student theatre tech with a rivalry with Dean over who is the geekiest. Introduced in the spring of 2020, she's the first new character introduced by Christina 'Steenz' Stewart.
- Jackie and Leslie: Charlotte's moms in the Steenz version.
- Celeste: Charlotte's older sister in the Steenz version.
- Ashley and John Tatulli: Dean's parents in the Steenz version.
- Sky: Kat's mother in the Steenz version.
- Darren: Kat's stepfather in the Steenz version.
- Shari: Kat's older stepsister in the Steenz version.
- Alyssa: Kat's younger half-sister in the Steenz version.

== Style ==
In the strip for April 6, 2020, Tatulli acknowledged the COVID-19 pandemic and its "social distancing" mandates (in the form of wearing Star Wars helmets to the grocery store), one of the first daily comic strips to do so.

On April 27, 2020, Mark Tatulli handed over the strip to a new artist, Christina "Steenz" Stewart. Their first strip, appearing that day, established that Heart and Dean were now in middle school.

== Upcoming animated series ==
On July 18, 2022, it was announced that Heart of the City would be adapted as an animated series. The series will be a co-production between Andrews McMeel Publishing and Canadian animation Slap Happy Cartoons. The series will use designs from the Steenz run of the strip.

== Collections ==
- Heart of the City (April 15, 2000, ISBN 978-0-7407-0576-2, Andrews McMeel Publishing)

== Links ==
- Mark Tatulli: Successful animator, illustrator, writer, artist, filmmaker, producer… and of course, cartoonist. An Exclusive interview. Tiziano Thomas Dossena, L'Idea Magazine, 2014
