= Sol Harrison =

American comic book colorist (1917–1989)

- Born: 1917
- Died: November 19, 1989 (aged 71–72)
- Areas: Editor, Colourist
- Pseudonym: Walter S. Hara
- Notable works: President of DC Comics

Sol Harrison (1917 – November 19, 1989) was an American comic book colorist, production manager, and executive whose career spanned nearly 50 years in the industry.

== Career ==
Sol Harrison attended high school with Jack Adler, and the two men often worked together doing engraving work. In 1933, Harrison did the color separations on Famous Funnies for Eastern Color Printing, one of the earliest modern American comic books. Writer Martin Pasko noted in 2008 that Harrison was the "guy who helped Charlie Gaines figure out how to produce the modern comics format."

Harrison became production manager for All-American Publications in 1942. When All-American became part of National Comics (later known as DC Comics), Harrison continued to work for the newly merged publisher. He was the colorist for the company's covers for 15 years. In 1972, he suggested publishing comics in an oversized format stating that "We could create a tabloid size comic that would stand out on the newsstand." This led to the launch of the Limited Collectors' Edition series later that year. He developed an internship program at DC which was later nicknamed the "Junior Woodchucks" by Bob Rozakis. In 1973, Harrison became DC's Vice-President in Charge of Operations and developed the idea of the DC Comicmobile, a van which sold comic books "like the ice cream man did". Harrison and Adler were featured on the cover of DC's self-produced fan magazine The Amazing World of DC Comics #10 (Jan. 1976). Harrison was promoted to president of the company in 1976 just as Jenette Kahn became publisher. Kahn stated in a 2012 interview that "I can't really say that Sol and I had much of a working relationship. He, more than anybody, resented my being hired because he felt that the job was rightfully his." Harrison served as president of the Comics Magazine Association of America from 1979 to 1980. He retired from DC Comics at the end of February 1981 and moved to Florida.

== Awards ==
In 1985, Harrison was named as one of the honorees by DC Comics in the company's 50th anniversary publication Fifty Who Made DC Great.

Preceded by n/a	President of DC Comics; 1976–1980	Succeeded by Jenette Kahn
