= Atul Malhotra =

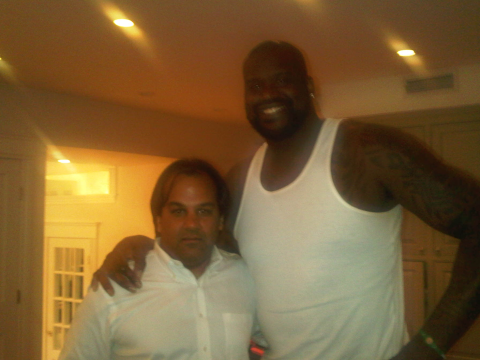
- Atul Malhotra with Shaquille O'Neal
- Education: University of Alberta; St. Thomas Medical Center; Mayo Clinic; Harvard Medical School
- Scientific career
- Workplaces: UC San Diego; American Thoracic Society; American College of Chest Physicians; Society of Critical Care Medicine

Atul Malhotra is the Vice Chair of Medicine for Research and Research Chief of pulmonary, critical care, sleep medicine, and physiology at the University of California, San Diego's Medical School. In addition, he is the Peter C. Farrell Presidential Chair and tenured professor of medicine at the same university. He is the author of almost 600 original research publications and over 300 reviews and book chapters.

== Early life and research ==
Atul Malhotra is a US citizen born in Edmonton, Alberta, Canada. He attended the University of Alberta in Canada, obtaining a bachelor's degree in Chemistry and a Medical degree in chemistry from the same university. He completed his internal medicine residency at the Mayo Clinic in Rochester, Minnesota.

Malhotra does research in the domains of pulmonary medicine, intensive care unit (ICU), obstructive sleep apnea (OSA), and other respiratory biology disciplines. He studies the biology underlying the consequences of sleep apnea as well as its causation. His group uses computational modelling, cell culture techniques, rodent models, epidemiology, and clinical trials in addition to its primary focus on human physiology. Finding new therapeutic targets for sleep apnea is the main goal of his lab to meet a critical public health need. He was global principal investigator for the SURMOUNT-OSA study which led to the FDA approval of tirzepatide for treatment of moderate to severe sleep apnea in people with obesity.

== Career ==
Atul Malhotra, who has more than 25 years of professional experience, is currently the director of research for pulmonary, critical care, and sleep medicine at the University of California, San Diego. He served as a professor of medicine, a sleep medicine specialist, the head of the division for pulmonary and critical care, and the Kenneth Moser Professor during his time at the University of California, San Diego.

== Awards and honors ==
- President of the American Thoracic Society
- William C. Dement Academic Achievement Award
- Mayo Clinic Distinguished Alumni Award
- University of Alberta Distinguished Alumni Award

== Notable patients ==
In 2011 Malhotra diagnosed Shaquille O'Neal with moderate sleep apnea as part of a sleep study conducted at Harvard Medical School.

== Bibliography ==
- Sleep Disorders: Diagnosis Management and Treatment: A Handbook for Clinicians.
- Cardiopulmonary Monitoring: Basic Physiology, Tools, and Bedside Management for the Critically Ill.

== Publication ==
- Epstein LJ, Kristo D, Strollo PJ, Friedman N, Malhotra A, Patil SP, Ramar K, Rogers R, Schwab RJ, Weaver EM, Weinstein. Clinical guideline for the evaluation, management and long-term care of obstructive sleep apnea in adults. Journal of Clinical Sleep Medicine.
- Heinzer R, Vat S, Marques-Vidal P, Marti-Soler H, Andries D, Tobback N, Mooser V, Preisig M, Malhotra A, Waeber G, Vollenweider P, Tafti M, Haba-Rubio J. Prevalence of sleep-disordered breathing in the general population: the HypnoLaus study. The Lancet.
- Benjafield AV, Ayas NT, Eastwood PR, Heinzer R, Ip MSM, Morrell MJ, Nunez CM, Patel SR, Penzel T, pin JL, Peppard PE, Sinha S, Tufik S, Valentine K, Malhotra A. Estimation of the global prevalence and burden of obstructive sleep apnoea: a literature-based analysis. The Lancet.
- Ayas NT, White DP, Manson JE, Stampfer MJ, Speizer FE, Malhotra A, and Hu FB. A prospective study of sleep duration and coronary heart disease in women. JAMA Internal Medicine.
- Jordan AS, McSharry DG, Malhotra A. Adult obstructive sleep apnea. The Lancet.
