= Maurice McGregor =

South African-born Canadian cardiologist and academic (1920–2025)

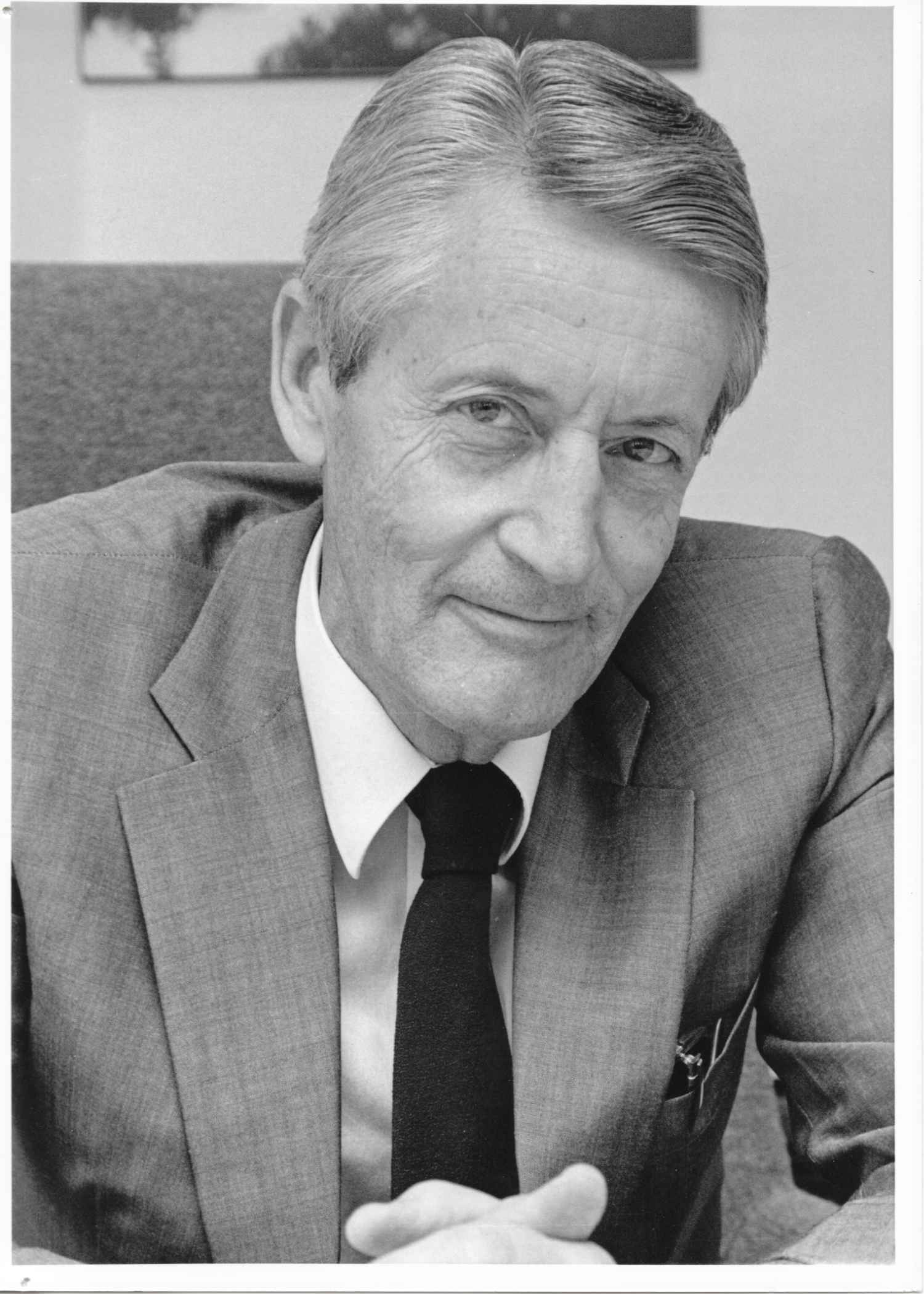
- Born: 24 March 1920; Rustenburg, South Africa
- Died: 4 August 2025 (aged 105)
- Occupations: Cardiologist, medical academic dean, university v-p, physician-in-chief
- Known for: cardiology, medical education, health technology assessment
- Spouse: Margaret Becklake (m. 1948; died 2018)
- Children: 2
- Awards: Officer of the Order of Canada; Chevalier de l’Ordre national du Québec; Prix ″Maurice McGregor,″ Agence d’évaluation des technologies et des modes d’intervention en santé

Academic background
- Education: MD University of the Witwatersrand (Johannesburg, South Africa)

Maurice McGregor, OC (24 March 1920 – 4 August 2025) was a South African-born Canadian cardiologist, academic leader and public policy advocate who has had a major impact on the practice of medicine, working largely from his base at McGill University in Montreal in the late 1950s into the second decade of the 21st century. After 13 years as the first chair of the pioneering Healthcare Technology Assessment Unit based at McGill, he retired in 2013, though he remained a consultant. McGregor was recognized for his "lifetime of outstanding achievement" with an Order of Canada award, conferred in 2010 by the Governor General of Canada.

== Early life ==
Maurice McGregor was raised by parents of British origin on a small farm in northern South Africa. His foundational education was at Michaelhouse School. He then attended the University of Witwatersrand in Johannesburg in pursuit of a medical degree. Upon finishing medical school in 1942, he entered wartime service in Italy as a physician with the British 8th Army and the US 5th Army (1943–46).

Returning to Johannesburg after World War II, he met Margaret Becklake, a newly graduated medical doctor whom he married when they both started postgraduate work in London, England. Here, he contributed to angiocardiography (Cine angiography had not yet been invented) when he invented and built a rapid cassette changer (with his own hands). From 1946 to 1957, McGregor was the author or co-author of 24 peer-reviewed journal articles in the field of cardiology, including three in the American Heart Journal and three in what is now named Heart (journal).

From 1954 through the early 1960s, McGregor and Margaret Becklake co-authored 10 articles in peer-reviewed journals that dealt with lung functions. When McGregor and Becklake returned to South Africa to practise in the early 1950s – he as a cardiovascular specialist and she as a respirologist (later an epidemiologist) – they found that the situation in their country had deteriorated due to the entrenchment of apartheid. This motivated them to emigrate to Canada with their young son and daughter.

== Career ==
After settling in Montreal in 1957, Maurice McGregor helped establish and co-directed the joint Cardio-Respiratory Service affiliated with two of McGill's teaching hospitals, the Royal Victoria Hospital and Montreal Children's Hospital. Within this service, McGregor studied less invasive ways of measuring cardiac output in children, in collaboration with Paul Sekelj, inventor of one of the first whole-blood oximeters that could be used clinically.

McGregor went on to become head of cardiology and then physician-in-chief at the Royal Victoria Hospital, Montreal, and dean of medicine and vice principal of McGill University. His university leadership roles occurred during a period of widespread protests in the late 1960s and early 1970s, including a doctors’ strike in the fall of 1970 over the advent of national health insurance, a policy that McGregor supported then and since. McGregor proved to be a bridge-builder during this turmoil, arguing in print the following year that "the problem should have been the subject of calm and dispassionate discussion.”

In 1973, McGregor and Becklake went to China as part of the Norman Bethune Exchange Lectureship between McGill University and Peking Medical College. This made them early pioneers of Western academics crossing political divides to exchange knowledge in China (U.S. President Nixon had gone to China the year before). They wrote about witnessing surgery done under acupuncture anesthesia and about research presented to them on that subject, noting the "paucity of up-to-date first-hand reports in the English language" and the importance "that this work be recognized in the West."

In 1984, the University of Witwatersrand (Wits) approached McGregor with a request to return to South Africa – then in the throes of turbulence surrounding the dismantling of apartheid – to be dean of medicine. During his leadership time (1984–87), Wits and the nearby black townships of Alexandra and Soweto were rocked by student protests. When a university-affiliated community health clinic in Alexandra treated youths wounded by police shotguns, McGregor went to the clinic and supported the position of his staff to hide the identities of those treated from police. In short, McGregor allied himself with those advocating for change – black medical students were enrolled in record numbers and the five university-affiliated hospitals were desegregated after he personally pressured the hospital directors.

After returning to Canada in 1987, McGregor (by now an emeritus professor) embarked on a new career path. The Quebec government asked him to head the new Conseil d’évaluation des technologies de la santé du Québec, the first such government body in North America, to evaluate the influx of new expensive equipment, drugs, and supplies into the healthcare market. He also became the chair and editor of Canada's Guidelines for the Management of Breast Cancer (1994–98). In 2000, McGregor became the founding chair of the Technology Assessment Unit of the McGill University Health Center. McGregor is called the “grandfather of health technology assessment” because as early as 1971, when he was McGill's dean of medicine, he spoke and wrote about controlling costs in order for governments to afford to underwrite healthcare for all: Canadians decided some years ago that they wanted all the tricks of modern medicine, such as renal transplantation and open heart surgery, to be fully available to all citizens. Like a good parent Canada has said of its sick "give them only the best and don't spare the expense". But now the accounts are coming in. The bill is too high, and yet the demand for universal accessibility to the best health services is nowhere near satisfied.

From 1989 through 2014, McGregor wrote 26 articles published in peer-reviewed journals, plus 74 other published pieces in books and reports, pushing for systematic reviews of the cost-versus-benefits of each new item of expensive technology and each pricey new drug before it is fully embraced by healthcare providers. He argued that unquestioned acceptance of new technology could cause limited healthcare dollars to be syphoned from more necessary and widely helpful interventions. One of his earliest articles on this subject was published in the New England Journal of Medicine in 1989, titled “Technology and the allocation of resources.” From 1991 through 1995, McGregor traveled to healthcare conferences across Canada, as well as to Washington D.C., Mexico, Brazil, and England, in response to invitations to explain Quebec's pioneering approach to "rationalizing and improving the use of technology" through systematic assessment. The results of McGill's own assessments – of dozens of interventions, from aortic valve bypass to gastric banding to prostate screening – are posted online for free access at The Technology Assessment Unit of McGill University Health Centre website. The site features "Guidelines for Systematic Literature Search," co-authored by McGregor and published in 2013.

In 2014, the Canadian Agency for Drugs and Technologies in Health created the Dr. Maurice McGregor Award to honor the next generation of experts in health technology assessment.

As of 2020, McGregor was the author or co-author of 157 pieces published in peer-reviewed journals on cardiovascular disease, cardiovascular physiology and pharmacology, medical education and health policy, plus 100 book chapters, reports, or other professional publications, and 101 abstracts. As an invited speaker, he gave 94 presentations at conferences held around the world.

== Death ==
McGregor was pre-deceased by his wife of 60 years, Dr. Margaret Becklake, when she died in October 2018 at age 96 from complications due to Alzheimer's disease. He died on 4 August 2025, at the age of 105 from complications caused by Parkinson's disease.

== Philosophy ==
Beyond his purely medical and administrative accomplishments, Maurice McGregor was known for publicly addressing difficult societal questions. His letters and op-eds have appeared regularly in leading medical journals, as well as in mass media outlets.

For instance, in a piece published on 16 April 1967 in the New England Journal of Medicine, McGregor outlined his opposition to the indiscriminate boycott of all South African educational institutions, pointing out that some of them were in fact developing non-white academicians.

He co-authored a letter addressing the benefits and harms of breast cancer screening, published in The Lancet, on 9 March 2013.

In February 2017, the Canadian Medical Association Journal published McGregor's point-by-point rebuttal to a stance taken by a deputy editor in favor of public and patient representation in designing clinical research trials.

In May 2019, at the age of 99, McGregor penned a letter to Canada's leading news magazine, Maclean’s, in rebuttal of an essay that rationalized cheating. McGregor wrote: Without a commitment to live by shared ethical values, society will just not work. Ethics matter immensely (“I cheat for my kids. So do you,” Parenting, May 2019). We should not cheat for our kids unless we want them to grow up believing that is how the world works, and if enough people believe that is how it works, that is how it will work.

In conferring the Order of Canada on McGregor in 2010, the Governor General called him “an exceptional teacher and role model” for his “lifetime of outstanding achievement, dedication to community and service to the nation.” Three years earlier, his wife, Margaret "Margot" Becklake, had been similarly recognized for her "outstanding contributions to fighting lung disease through research and education for more than 60 years.″ The couple raised two civic-focused children: James McGregor, an urban planner who focuses on affordable housing and ending homelessness; and Margaret McGregor, a family physician and health policy researcher in British Columbia who focuses on care for the elderly.
