= University of New Mexico School of Medicine =

Public medical school in Albuquerque, New Mexico, US

Coordinates: 35°5′22.7″N 106°37′3.3″W

- Type: Public
- Established: 1961
- Affiliations: University of New Mexico
- Dean: Patricia W. Finn
- Students: 1,574 (Fall 2018)
- Location: Albuquerque, New Mexico
- Campus: Urban
- Mascot: Lobos
- Website: hsc.unm.edu/medicine/

The University of New Mexico School of Medicine (UNM School of Medicine) is a division of the University of New Mexico Health Sciences Center (UNM HSC) located in Albuquerque, New Mexico. The UNM School of Medicine is home to a variety of degree-granting programs, including the only MD program in the state.

== History ==
The school was established in 1961 by the Regents of the University of New Mexico. The first class was admitted in 1964, and the school graduated its first class in 1968. The school also received full accreditation by the Liaison Committee on Medical Education that same year. The school uses UNM Hospital as its primary teaching hospital, along with the VA Medical Center located at Kirtland Air Force Base, along with the other hospitals that make up the UNM Hospitals system. Medical students may also complete select rotations with community providers and hospital systems throughout the state of New Mexico.

In 1994, University administration decided to combine the School of Medicine, along with other programs in Physical and Occupation Therapy, Biochemistry, Medical Laboratory Sciences, and other programs into one entity known as the UNM Health Sciences Center, with the aim of combining the education and research contributions of each of these entities into one. While they may be grouped together on paper, day-to-day operation of each department is somewhat independent of each other.

=== Deans ===
- Paul B. Roth
- Martha Cole McGrew (interim)
- Michael E. Richards (interim)
- Patricia W. Finn (2022-present)

== The school today ==
MD program admissions

Currently, the MD program enrolls about 106 new students each academic year, with the total enrollment in the MD program comprising about 15% of the School of Medicine student body. Because the school is supported with state money, primary admissions preference is given to New Mexico residents. Secondary preference is given to applicants from other Western states that do not have a medical school, such as Idaho, Montana, and Wyoming. As is the case with virtually all other medical schools in the United States, admission is very competitive.

MD-PhD (MSTP) program designation

The University of New Mexico School of Medicine received a Medical Scientist Training Program (MSTP) grant in 2024.

National recognition

The school is widely known for its Rural Medicine, Family Medicine, and Primary Care Medicine programs. These programs are consistently ranked among the best nationally, with the Rural Medicine program consistently being ranked in the top five nationally. In 2023, U.S. News & World Report rated UNM 4th in Primary Care, 4th in Most Diverse Medical Schools, 2nd in Most Graduates Practicing in Medically Underserved Areas, 11th in Family Medicine, and 81st in Research.

Additionally, the state-of-the-art Domenici Center for Health Sciences Education at the school has received attention for both the Leonard M. Napolitano Ph.D. Anatomical Education Center (anatomy lab) and the Interprofessional Healthcare Simulation Center (IHSC). The anatomy lab was named in recognition of Leonard Napolitano, an anatomist and a founding member of the School of Medicine in 1964. The IHSC is designed to simulate the provider experience using standardized patients and allows students to experience and practice clinical skills while not putting patients at risk. The IHSC is unique in that it houses four different simulations including Acute Care, In-Patient, Out-Patient, and Pharmacy.

== Gallery ==
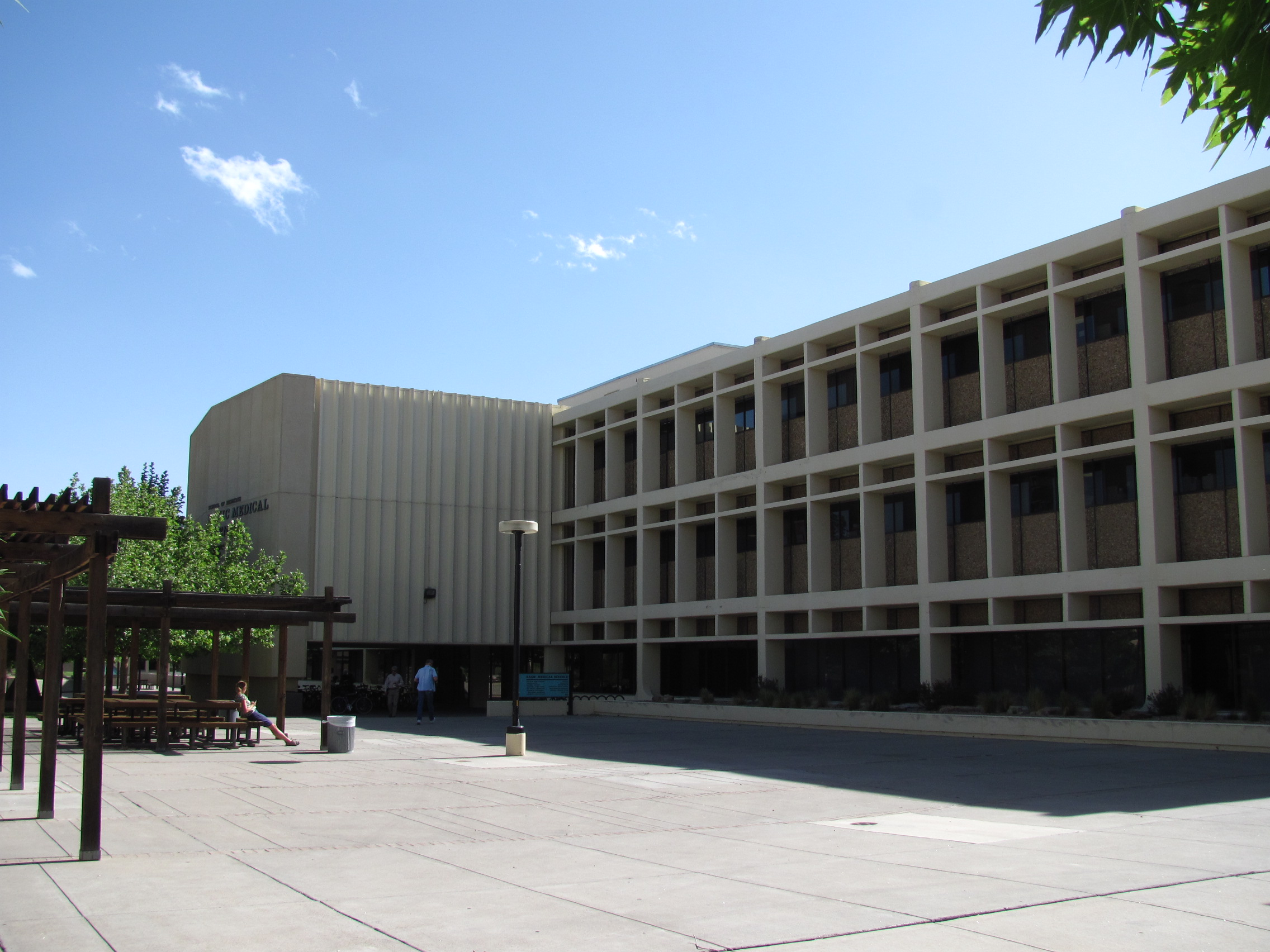
Reginald Heber Fitz Hall, formerly known as Basic Medical Sciences Building

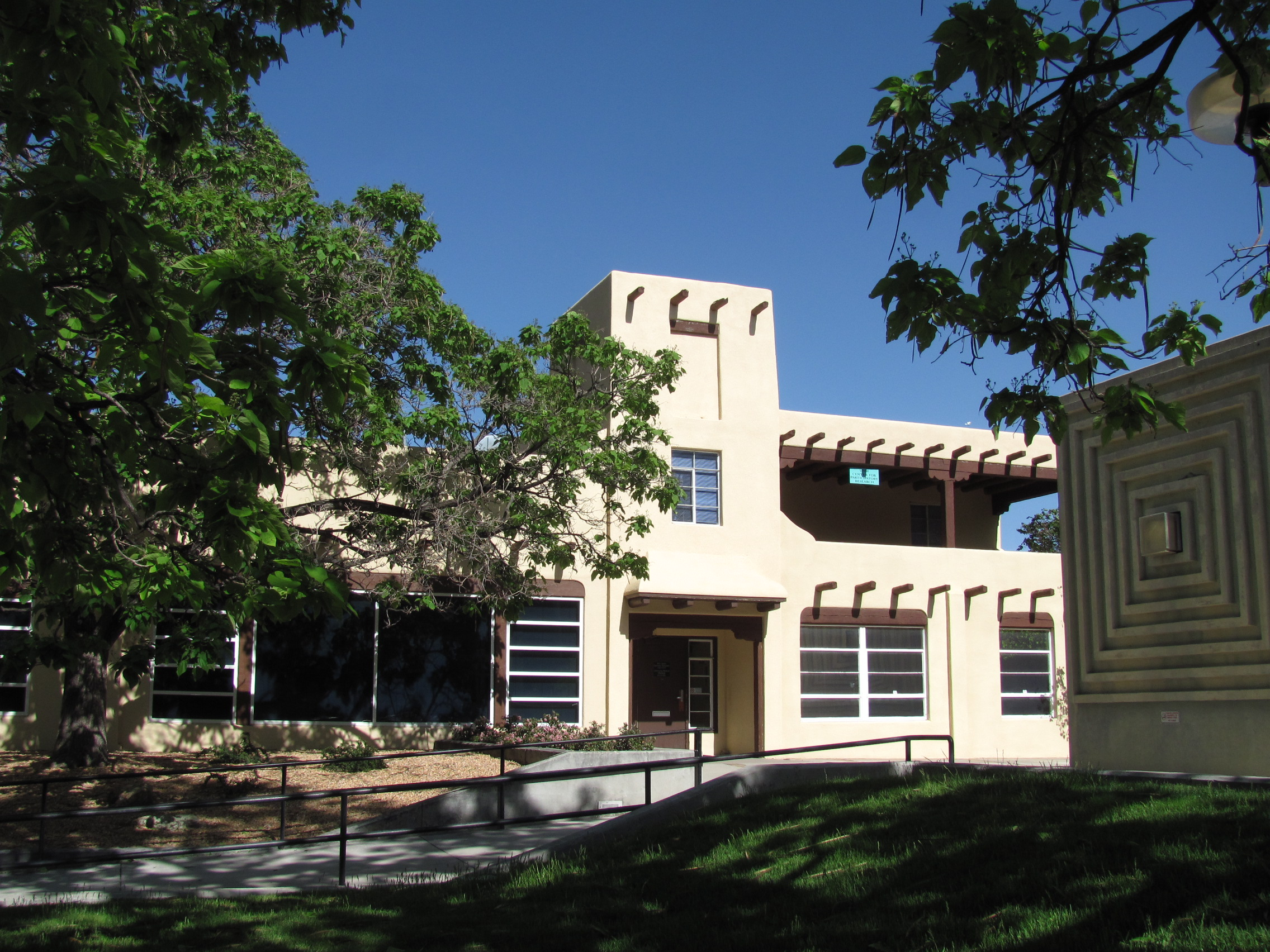
School of Medicine
Building No. 2
