= Dina Brooks =

Canadian health scholar and academic

Dina Brooks is a Canadian health scholar and academic. She held a Canada Research Chair in Pulmonary Rehabilitation at University of Toronto. She has over 300 publications and several million dollars in research funding. Since January 2019, she is the Vice Dean, Faculty of Heath Sciences and Executive Director, Institute of Applied Health Sciences at McMaster University. She serves as Chair of Long-term Planning for the Canadian Thoracic Society.

She lives in Burlington and has two children, Jakob and Justin.
