= Patricia W. Finn =

American pulmonologist and academic administrator

- Education: Albert Einstein College of Medicine
- Spouse: David L. Perkins
- Scientific career
- Fields: Pulmonology
- Workplaces: Harvard University; University of California, San Diego; University of Illinois Chicago; University of New Mexico

Patricia W. Finn is an American pulmonologist and academic administrator specialized in the microbiome and immune-mediated pulmonary diseases. She has served as the fifth dean of the University of New Mexico School of Medicine since 2022.

== Life ==
Finn was raised by Irish immigrant parents in Alphabet City, Manhattan. She was a first-generation college student and the first in her family to become a physician. She earned an undergraduate degree in 1976. Finn completed a M.D. in 1980 at the Albert Einstein College of Medicine followed by a residency at the Montefiore Medical Center. She conducted a pulmonary medicine fellowship at the Massachusetts General Hospital and a postdoc in immunology at the Harvard School of Public Health.

Finn is a clinical pulmonologist who researches the microbiome and immune-mediated pulmonary diseases. She worked as an educator and investigator at the Brigham and Women's Hospital. Finn was the Kenneth M. Moser professor of medicine and director of the division of pulmonary and critical care medicine at the University of California, San Diego. She was inducted in to the Association of American Physicians in 2007. In 2012, Finn moved to Chicago to head the department of medicine at the University of Illinois Hospital & Health Sciences System. She was the Earl M. Bane endowed professor at the University of Illinois College of Medicine. She was also its associate dean for strategic initiatives and the associate program director of the medical scientist training program. Finn was president of the American Thoracic Society from 2013 to 2014 and of the Association of Professors of Medicine. On September 1, 2022, she became the fifth dean of the University of New Mexico School of Medicine. She succeeded interim dean Michael Richards. She is its first female dean. The same year, Finn was inducted into the American Clinical and Climatological Association.

Finn is married to physician-scientist David L. Perkins.
