= Canadian Lung Association =

Non-profit organization promoting lung health

The Canadian Lung Association (CLA; French: Association pulmonaire du Canada) is a national organization and volunteer-based health charity that supports lung health research, education, prevention of disease/disorders and advocacy in Canada.

Beginning as a movement in 1900 to control the spread of tuberculosis (TB) and provide better services for TB patients, the CLA today focuses on a range of pulmonary-related issues and concerns. This includes leading initiatives to promote pulmonary health and help prevent lung disease.

== About ==
The CLA works at the national, provincial, and community levels to improve and promote lung health. Its focus is primarily on chronic lung diseases like asthma and COPD, infectious diseases like TB, flu, and pneumonia, and breathing disorders like sleep apnea, cystic fibrosis, and lung cancer. They provide information to both citizens and governments and advocate for improved care for lung disease patients.

To prevent lung diseases, the CLA conducts numerous initiatives including programs to inform people about the effects of air pollution and tobacco use. This includes providing help to smokers who are trying to quit, and providing educational material and programs to reduce the number of people who take up smoking. Transportation, radon and wood smoke issues are the subjects of CLA education and advocacy efforts. They also encourage governments at every level to create regulations, laws and policies that strengthen societal lung health in Canada in general.

The CLA funds medical research in Canada to find treatments and cures for lung diseases, primarily through the Canadian Thoracic Society and Canadian Respiratory Health Professionals. They assist doctors and allied health professionals in setting and maintaining the highest standards in patient care, and to develop and convey new knowledge about lung diseases and treatments. The CLA's medical journal, produced in collaboration with the Canadian Thoracic Society, is the quarterly Canadian Respiratory Journal.

In 2020, the Ontario Lung Association ended its partnership with the Canadian Lung Association and renamed itself the Lung Health Foundation. In late 2021, the CLA said that additional provincial groups had ended their relationship with the national body, and that it was undertaking a review of its operating model. The BC Lung Association (now the BC Lung Foundation) and Alberta Lung have confirmed that they are no longer associated with the CLA, while Lung Saskatchewan has similarly rebranded.

== Programs and services ==
The Lung Association offers various programs and services through its national and provincial offices.

The national office, located in Ottawa, supports the work of the provincial associations. In addition, the national office coordinates national fundraising activities, including the annual Christmas Seal Campaign. It also supports national lung health programs like Breathworks for those with COPD. Apart from that, it delivers online lung health information and also leads advocacy campaigns at the federal government level. Managing a national research program is also a service offered by the Lung Association.

The provincial organizations, working in every province and territory, deliver lung health services and programs through their local offices and volunteer networks. Provincial Lung Associations offer a variety of programs, which include presentations and teaching materials on lung health topics, quit lines to help smokers overcome their addiction; and support groups for people living with lung diseases, which help them to build their moral support. Apart from that, it provides information about lung diseases, treatments, and how to cope. The CLA also organizes local fundraising activities, and has good expertise and advocacy on provincial lung health issues. The Canadian Lung Association carries out professional development and training for lung health professionals.

A close connection between The Lung Association and the Governor General of Canada goes back to 1900, when the 8th Governor General of Canada, the Earl of Minto, helped found the Canadian Tuberculosis Association (as The Lung Association was originally known) at a meeting at Rideau Hall.

== Research ==
The CLA funds medical research in Canada to find treatments and cures for lung disease and to better understand lung function and physiology and the causes of lung disease. All research funded by the CLA and the provincial Lung Associations is subjected to peer review.

== See also ==
- Canadian Institutes of Health Research
