= American Journal of Respiratory Cell and Molecular Biology =

- Discipline: Pulmonology
- Language: English
- Edited by: Andrew J. Halayko

Publication details
- History: 1989–present
- Publisher: American Thoracic Society (United States)
- Frequency: Monthly
- Impact factor: 5.3 (2024)

Standard abbreviations
- ISO 4: Am. J. Respir. Cell Mol. Biol.

Indexing
- CODEN: AJRBEL
- ISSN: 1044-1549 (print); 1535-4989 (web)
- LCCN: 89643737
- OCLC no.: 19699650

Links
- Journal homepage; Online access; Online archive

The American Journal of Respiratory Cell and Molecular Biology is a monthly peer-reviewed medical journal and an official publication of the American Thoracic Society. It covers research on the structure and function of the respiratory system under physiologic and pathophysiologic conditions. It was established in July 1989. The founding editors-in-chief were Jerome S. Brody, Robert M. Senior, and Mary C. Williams. John A. Mcdonald served as editor from 1993 to 1998. Kenneth B. Adler (North Carolina State University) served as editor from 2009 to 2016. Paul Schumacker (Northwestern University) served as editor from October 1, 2016, to October 21, 2023. Andrew Halayko (University of Manitoba) assumed the editorship on November 1, 2023.

== Abstracting and indexing ==
The journal is abstracted and indexed in BIOSIS Previews, Current Contents/Life Sciences, Current Contents/Critical Care Medicine, Embase, Index Medicus/MEDLINE/PubMed, Science Citation Index Expanded, and Scopus. According to the Journal Citation Reports, the journal has a 2024 impact factor of 5.3.
