= Jenette Kahn =

American editor and publishing executive (born 1947)

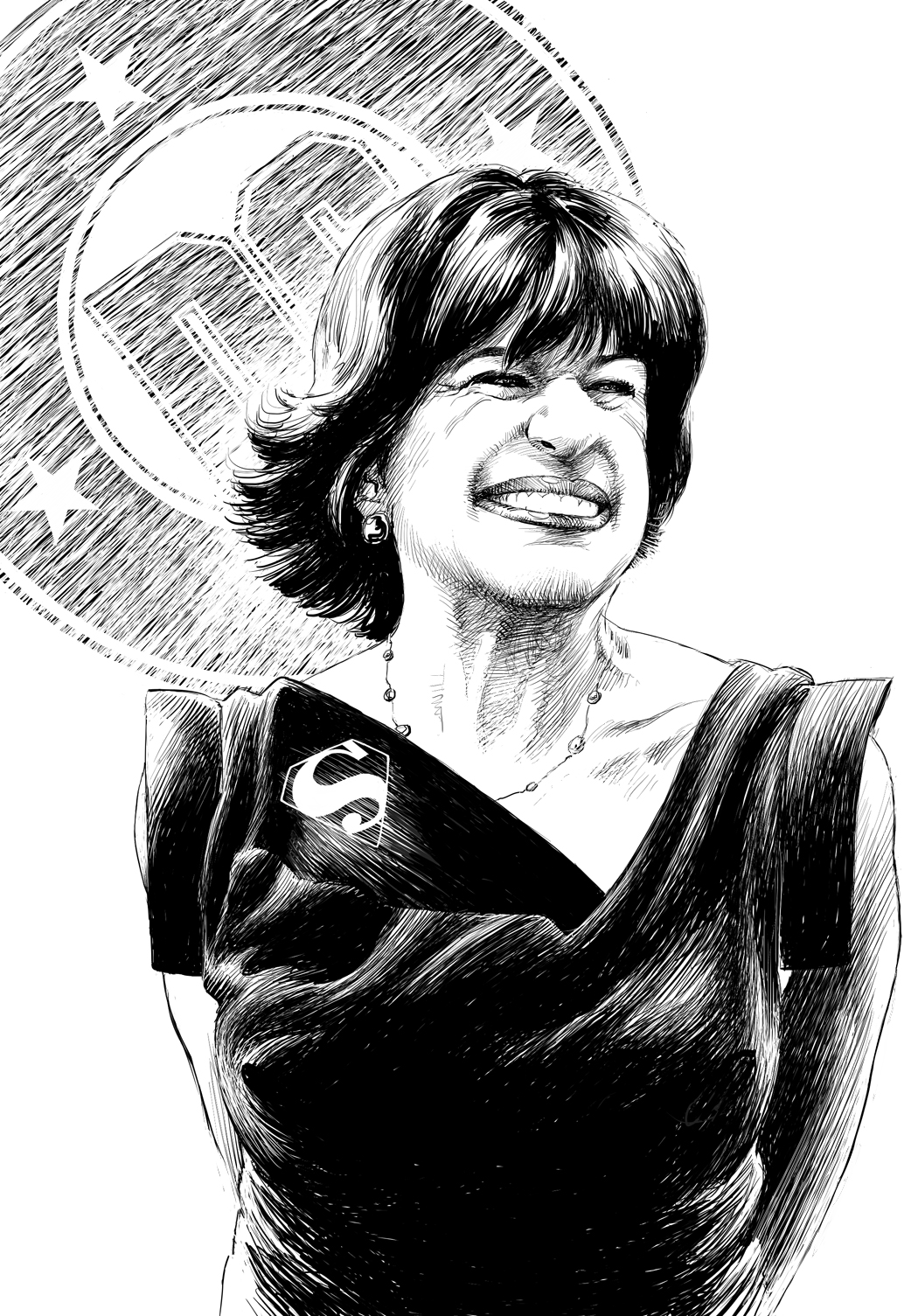
- Portrait of Jenette Kahn by Michael Netzer
- Born: May 16, 1947 (age 79)
- Area: Publisher
- Awards: Library of Congress Living Legends, 2000; Inkpot Award, 2010

Jenette Kahn (/kɑːn/; born May 16, 1947) is an American comic book editor and executive. She joined DC Comics in 1976 as publisher, and five years later was promoted to president. In 1989, she stepped down as publisher and assumed the title of editor-in-chief while retaining the office of president. After 26 years with DC, she left the company in 2002.

== Early life ==
Jenette Kahn grew up in Boston. Her father was a rabbi. Her brother, Si Kahn, is a singer-songwriter and activist. She was an avid comics fan, a practice supported by her parents, with particular favorites being Batman, Superman, Little Lulu, Uncle Scrooge, and Archie.

== Career ==
After graduating from Radcliffe College with a degree in art history, Kahn eventually founded three magazines for young people. The original publication, Kids, was entirely written by children for one another. Its subject matter included drug abuse, diversity, animal protection, and the environment. Kahn's second magazine was Dynamite, for Scholastic Inc. Kahn followed with Smash for Xerox Education Publications.

=== DC Comics ===
Kahn was 28 years old on February 2, 1976, when she became publisher of DC Comics, a division of Warner Bros. and home to over five thousand characters, including Superman, Batman and Wonder Woman. Sol Harrison served as the company's president. Kahn stated in a 2012 interview that "I can't really say that Sol and I had much of a working relationship. He, more than anybody, resented my being hired because he felt that the job [of publisher] was rightfully his." In February 1981, she became president following the retirement of Harrison. She was the youngest person in the company to become president of a division, and the first woman. Furthermore, before Kahn began her new position, she was instrumental in dissuading the head of Warner Publishing Services from simply ending National's publishing in favor of simple license maintenance, and kept it a going concern.

To mark her new direction for the company, Kahn officially renamed National Periodical Publications to DC Comics, complete with a bold new company logo, nicknamed the "DC Bullet", designed by Milton Glaser. Furthermore, she moved to centralize editorial from its individual fiefdoms to place the characters in a more interactive DC Multiverse with a more systematic approval process for the artistic staff to produce fewer and commercially sounder titles. To that end, Kahn sought to hire young staff to revitalize the content such as an unsuccessful attempt to recruit Marvel Comics mainstay artist, John Buscema, and a successful recruitment of major Marvel writer, Steve Englehart. Later in her administration, Kahn's recruitment goals became easier for the fact that Marvel Comics' Editor-in-Chief, Jim Shooter, was proving alienating to much of his company's creative staff and they consequently proved receptive to Kahn's offers including major talents like Roy Thomas, Gene Colan, Marv Wolfman, and George Perez.

In addition, Kahn, unlike her predecessors, was impressed by Jack Kirby's seminal Fourth World titles, like The New Gods, and viewed their abrupt cancellation as a serious mistake. While Jack Kirby could not return to DC when Kahn revived the property in the 1970s as he was under contract with his return to Marvel, Kahn's faith in the property was borne out in the 1980s when the toy company, Kenner Products, judged it ideal for their Super Powers Collection action figure adaptation of the DC characters. This enabled Kahn to invite the now available Kirby to not only return to his characters in the first two Super Powers limited series, but also design their action figures for Kenner, earning his first royalties for his work.

Kahn initiated the "DC Explosion" of new titles and formats which was followed in 1978 by a company downturn referred to as the "DC Implosion. Along with editor and executive vice president Paul Levitz and managing editor Dick Giordano, Kahn then revitalized the company through the remainder of the decade and the 1980s, including the introduction of "Dollar Comics" publications, as well as limited series to allow for more flexible arrangements for the talent. Kahn supported creators' rights in an industry in which royalties and other traditional publishing rights were not the norm, thus giving the talent a stake in the commercial success of their work that the industry's traditional work-for-hire arrangements never encouraged. In 1989, she assumed the title of editor-in-chief while retaining the office of president but stepped down as publisher.

Kahn oversaw the launch in 1993 of the Vertigo imprint and of Milestone Media, a minority-founded and ethnically diverse line of comic books that DC published for several years and from which Static Shock, the animated show on The WB television network, was developed. Kahn is credited with overseeing a successful period of reinvention for DC's classic characters, including the death and rebirth of Superman. Giordano commented that Kahn had no editorial restrictions on creators, as far as he could tell. Under Kahn's leadership, DC became known for pushing boundaries in subject matter by addressing issues of domestic violence, sexual orientation, gun violence, homelessness, racism, and AIDS in the company's mainstream titles. One exception to this editorial stance was Kahn cancelling an issue of Swamp Thing where the title character interacts with Jesus, which led to the writer and artist Rick Veitch quitting, citing censorship concerns.

She oversaw a diversification of the originally overwhelmingly male staff at DC, to the point where when she left, almost half the employees were women. Kahn left DC Comics in 2002 after 26 years with the company to pursue a career as a film producer.

=== Double Nickel Entertainment ===
Kahn is a partner in Double Nickel Entertainment, a film production company she co-founded with Adam Richman after leaving DC Comics. Double Nickel's first film was The Flock (2007) starring Richard Gere and Claire Danes and directed by Andrew Lau. Its second was Gran Torino (2008), starring Clint Eastwood, who also directed.

In addition, Kahn serves on the boards of Exit Art and Harlem Stage, and is an advisor to The Bill T. Jones/Arnie Zane Dance Company. She is a founding member of The Committee of 200, a nationwide forum of key women in business. Her first book, In Your Space, was published by Abbeville Press in 2002.

== Awards ==
Kahn received the Library of Congress Living Legends award in the "Writers and Artists" category in April 2000 for her significant contributions to America's cultural heritage. She received an Inkpot Award in July 2010.

President Ronald Reagan honored Kahn for her work on drug awareness, and she has been honored by the Clinton Administration, Secretary of State Madeleine Albright, the United Nations, and the Department of Defense for her work on land mines.

The FBI honored Kahn for her efforts on gun control, as did former Governor Douglas Wilder of Virginia, who credited her with helping to pass stricter gun control legislation in his state. She was honored by the World Design Foundation for outstanding creative achievements.

Kahn created The Wonder Woman Foundation in honor of Wonder Woman's 40th Anniversary. In its three years of existence, the foundation contributed more than $350,000 in grants to women over 40 in various categories.

On October 9, 2026, at the 38th Harvey Awards ceremony, Kahn was one of a group of creators associated with Batman, who along with Frank Miller, Klaus Janson, Jerry Robinson, David Mazzucchelli, and Dick Sprang, was inducted into the Harvey Awards Hall of Fame.

== Bibliography ==
- In Your Space: Personalizing Your Home and Office (Abbeville Press, 2002), ISBN 0-7892-0755-9

Preceded by Carmine Infantino	Publisher of DC Comics; 1976–1989	Succeeded by Paul Levitz
Preceded by Sol Harrison	President of DC Comics; 1981–2002	Succeeded by Paul Levitz
Preceded by n/a	Editor-in-Chief of DC Comics; 1989–2002	Succeeded by Bob Harras
