= Mark Tatulli =

American comic strip artist

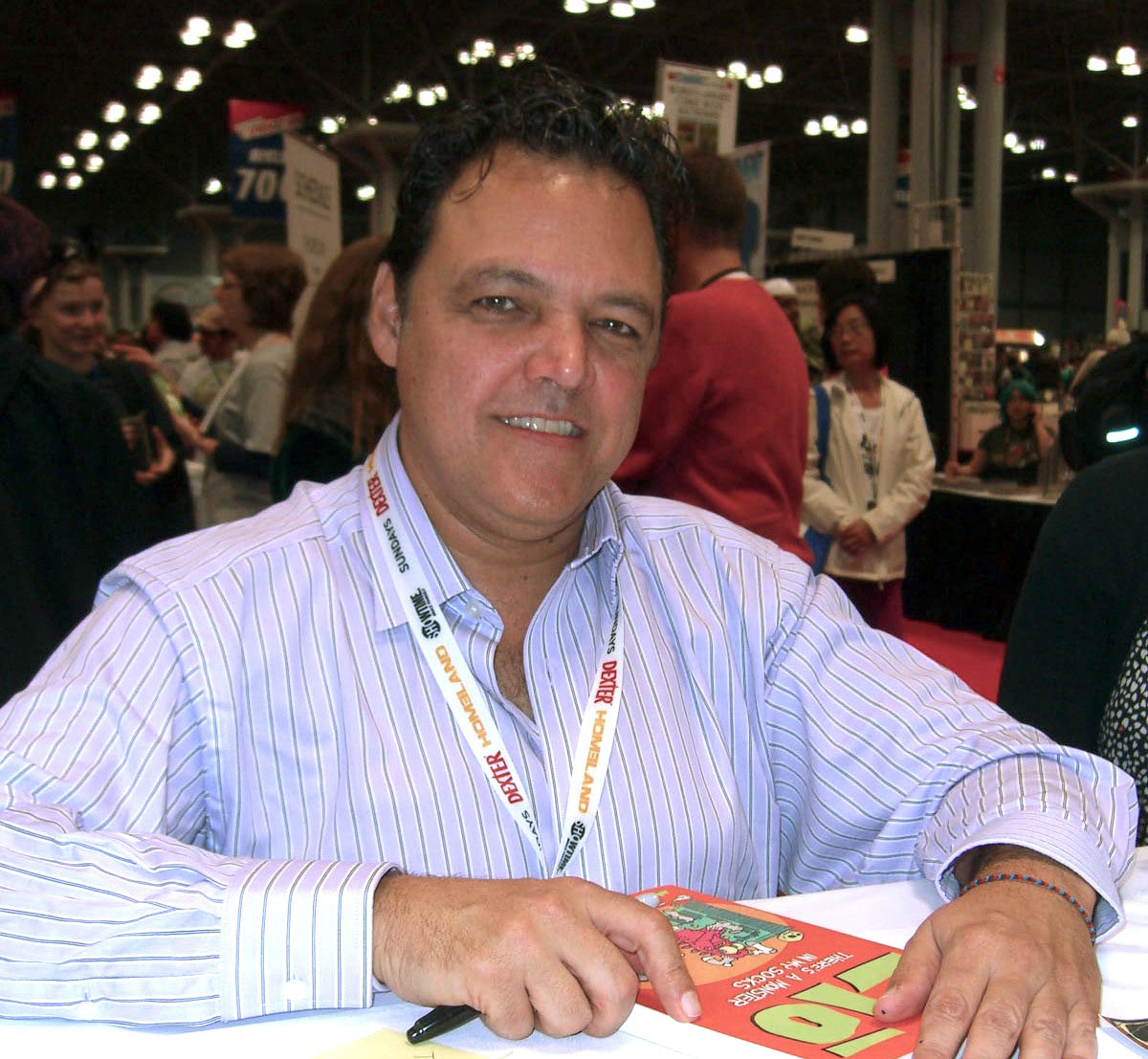
- Tatulli at the 2012 New York Comic Con.
- Known for: Comics

Mark Tatulli is an American cartoonist, writer, animator and television producer, known for his strips Liō and Heart of the City and for his work on the cable reality television series Trading Spaces and A Wedding Story, for which he has won three Emmy Awards. His comics have appeared in hundreds of newspapers around the world.

== Early life ==
Tatulli grew up in Willingboro Township, New Jersey and started drawing in his youth, publishing his first cartoons in the pages of the Burlington County Times. A resident of Washington Township, Gloucester County, New Jersey, Tatulli began drawing in elementary school, where his cartoons first appeared in the school's newspaper. After he became a syndicated cartoonist, a former teacher of his told him that "I can't believe you're still doing the same crap you were doing in junior high, and now getting paid for it."

In a 2014 interview with L'Idea, Tatulli cited Berkeley Breathed 's Bloom County, Bill Watterson's Calvin and Hobbes, Garry Trudeau's Doonesbury and the ensemble at Mad magazine as being the cartoons that most influenced his career and style as a cartoonist.

== Comics works ==
After trying unsuccessfully to promote eight different strips over a decade, his first comic strip was Bent Halos, which features two angels named Harold and Mort who achieve little success in their attempted roles as guardian angels. First created in August 1994 with syndicator Lew Little Enterprises, the strip was appearing in 12 newspapers nationwide by 1996. By 2014, Tatulli said that he had no plans to bring it back for publication.

Heart of the City, which debuted in November 1998, features a girl named Heart who lives in Philadelphia. The character Heart is inspired by Tatulli's daughter Lexa.

Liō, which has been published since May 2006, is a "sweetly dark" pantomime cartoon without dialogue that was inspired by Tatulli's love of the horror movies he watched while growing up as a child in the 1970s. The title character is a "weird little boy" who inhabits a world occupied by aliens, monsters, robots and other strange characters. According to Tatulli, he came up with the name "Lio" because he "wanted a simple name to go with the simple, wordless concept. Just three letters." In 2012, Tatulli released Lio: There's a Monster in My Socks, a book compiling comic strips from the first year that the cartoon was distributed, with a focus on those strips that would most appeal to children.

Recognized in 2009 as "Best Comic Strip" by the National Cartoonists Society, his cartoons were being published in about 400 newspapers around the world by 2012. He has won three Emmy Awards for the production design he did for the cable reality television series Trading Spaces and A Wedding Story.

Tatulli is also the author/illustrator of the middle-grade novel series, "Desmond Pucket". Three books in the series were released: Desmond Pucket Makes Monster Magic (2013), Desmond Pucket and the Mountain Full of Monsters (2014/2015), and Desmond Pucket and the Cloverfield Junior High Carnival of Horrors (2016).

Tatulli released a biographical graphic novel, Short and Skinny in 2018. It chronicles a summer in middle school in which he was inspired by the original Star Wars (film) to make his own parody of the film, while dealing with navigating relationships with bullies, friends, parents and body image.

In late 2019, Tatulli decided to retire from drawing “Heart of the City” after 22 years, choosing instead to focus on "Liō" and creating graphic novels. Andrews McMeel Syndication began searching for a cartoonist to continue the strip and announced in April 2020 that St. Louis-based African-American cartoonist Steenz (real name Christina Stewart) would take over the writing and drawing of “Heart of the City,” adopting a completely new art style. The last daily "Heart of the City" strip drawn by Tatulli was published April 25, 2020, with the last Tatulli-drawn Sunday "Heart" strip published May 17.

== Filmography ==
- Trading Spaces (HGTV, post producer)
- A Wedding Story (Discovery/TLC, post producer)
