= Dynamite (magazine) =

American children's magazine

- The April 1975 issue of Dynamite featured a Droste effect image of TV star Jimmie Walker, whose catch phrase was "Dy-no-mite!".
- Former editors: Jenette Kahn, Jane Stine, Linda Williams Aber
- Categories: Children's magazine
- Frequency: Monthly
- First issue: March 1974; 52 years ago
- Final issue Number: March 1992; Volume 15, Number 5
- Company: Scholastic
- Country: United States
- Based in: New York City
- Language: English
- ISSN: 0163-3562

Dynamite was a magazine for children founded by Jenette Kahn and published by Scholastic Inc. from 1974 until 1992. The magazine changed the fortunes of the company, becoming the most successful publication in its history and inspiring four similar periodicals for Scholastic, Bananas, Wow, Hot Dog! and Peanut Butter. Kahn edited the first three issues of Dynamite. The next 109 issues were edited by Jane Stine, wife of children's author R. L. Stine, followed by Linda Williams Aber (aka "Magic Wanda"). The writer-editor staff was future children's book writer Ellen Weiss, future novelist-lawyer Alan Rolnick and future screenwriter-playwright Mark Saltzman. The first issue was dated March 1974 and featured the characters Hawkeye Pierce and Radar O'Reilly from the television series M*A*S*H. The final issue, #165, was dated March 1992 and featured actress Julia Roberts and Austrian actor Arnold Schwarzenegger.

== Description ==
Dynamite magazine served as an activity book each month, offering tricks, recipes, games, and contests. It also served as a monthly update on pop culture. Dynamite magazine was available through subscription, in limited quantities at newsstands, and through monthly orders circulated by school teachers using Scholastic's Arrow Book Club.

In 1984, Scholastic Inc. reduced the number of color pages and lowered the publication rate from twelve monthly issues of Dynamite per year to six (and subsequently five) issues per year. Editors developed more features about teen idols in the late 1980s and early 1990s, with cover stories on Johnny Depp, Alyssa Milano, Corey Haim, Corey Feldman, and rapper Will Smith, along with two 8 x 11 mini-posters per issue. Features from the later years included the Dynamite Activity Center, Dynamite Puzzle Pages, and spooky stories by R. L. Stine (aka Jovial Bob Stine), who would later create the Goosebumps series in the 1990s.

== Features and format ==
Dynamite's features included "Magic Wanda", a how-to guide to selected magic tricks; "Bummers", an emphasis of children's one-line woes, which would start with the words: "Don't you hate it when..."; "And Now a Word from Our Sponsor" a commercial parody in comic form; the puzzle pages of the ghoulish Count Morbida; "Hot Stuff," a section featuring gags and new items in stores; the birth and growth of a horse called Foxy Fiddler; reprinted origin stories on Marvel and DC superheroes (and later the comic superheroes the "Dynamite Duo"); and "Good Vibrations," an advice column. Dynamite covers profiled three decades in television series (from The Six Million Dollar Man to Beverly Hills, 90210), cartoons (from "Snoopy" (Peanuts) to "Garfield"), movie stars (from Bruce Lee to River Phoenix), music stars (from Kiss, John Denver, or Elvis to Paula Abdul and Rick Springfield), and other assorted themes.

In addition to items on the back covers to punch out or assemble (such as puzzles, games, postcards, mobiles, bookmarks, or masks), Dynamite also included bonus inserts, such as fold-out posters, greeting cards, calendars, or records. Often the magazine would contain additional bonus inserts such as baseball cards, stickers, or glow-in-the-dark items. Occasional 3-D posters with glasses were also popular, featuring images such as King Kong, skateboarding, and outer space.

The magazine's reader input included an invitation for readers to send in their own "Bummers". Dynamite offered a $5.00 royalty for any bummer it accepted and an incidental note that readers never have to draw the accompanying picture.

== Cover stories ==
Issue	Volume	Number	Date	Cover Story	Notes
1			March 1974	Dynamite Meets M*A*S*H!	
2			April 1974	Dynamite and the Seven Waltons	
3			May 1974	A Visit to the MADhouse: A New Dynamite Reader – Ecch!	
4			October 1974	The Love Bug Returns: Herbie Tells All	
5			November 1974	Born Free: Dynamite gets thrown to the lions!	
6			December 1974	This Is Your Life, Snoopy	
7			January 1975	All About All in the Family	
8			February 1975	Inside The Six Million Dollar Man	
9			March 1975	John Denver and Dynamite: Farrrr-out	
10			April 1975	"Now that's what I call DY-NO-MITE!"	
11			May 1975	Little House on the Prairie: A Big Story!	
12			June 1975	Welcome to the Dynamite Monster Bash!	
13			July 1975	Dynamite Visits TV's Land of the Lost!	
14			August 1975	Inside Disney World! What it's really like!	
15			September 1975	The Monster Hall of Fame: Enter If You Dare!	
16			October 1975	TV '76: A Dawn Good Season!	
17			November 1975	Bruce Lee Lives!	
18			December 1975	Invisible Man: TV's Most Outtasite Character!	
19			January 1976	Attention! Attention! New Men on M*A*S*H	
20			February 1976	Cher!	
21			March 1976	J. J. In a Movie! Dyn-o-mite!	
22			April 1976	Face to Face with Fonzie!	
23			May 1976	Meet the Sweat Hogs	
24			June 1976	Let's Go to The Hop! Special Dynamite Fifties Party Issue!	
25			July 1976	Space: 1999 Takes Off!	
26			August 1976	Welcome to the San Diego Zoo	
27			September 1976	Catching Up with The Bionic Woman!	
28			October 1976	A Dynamite Double Feature! Laverne and Shirley And King Kong!	
29			November 1976	The Six Million Dollar Man vs. The Bionic Woman!	
30			December 1976	Dynamite Meets Donny and Marie!	
31			January 1977	The Bay City Rollers: An Exclusive Interview!	
32			February 1977	Fonzie and Pinky Face the Future!	
33			March 1977	A Dynamite Duo – The Captain and Tennille!	
34			April 1977	John Travolta: Barbarino and Beyond!	
35			May 1977	Charlie Brown, Superstar!	
36			June 1977	What's Happening is What's Happening!!	
37			July 1977	Bob Hegyes Is a Real Person!	
38	1	1	July 1977	Mark Fidrych: Big Bird of Baseball	
39	1	2	August 1977	The Return of The Brady Bunch!	
40	1	3	September 1977	Farrah!	
41	1	4	October 1977	The Hardy Boys: A Dynamite Detective Story!	
42	1	5	November 1977	Sylvester Stallone: What's next for the star of Rocky?	
43	1	6	December 1977	Catching Up With Logan's Run!	
44	1	7	January 1978	Star Wars And Shaun - Top Stars of the Year!	
45	1	8	February 1978	Meet Kristy McNichol!	
46	1	9	March 1978	Kate Jackson	
47	1	10	April 1978	Happy Birthday, MAD!	
48	1	11	May 1978	Shields and Yarnell: Wind 'Em Up and Laugh	
49	1	12	June 1978	Cheryl Ladd	
50	2	1	July 1978	The Best of Dynamite!	
51	2	2	August 1978	Special Hollywood Issue!	
52	2	3	September 1978	Lou Ferrigno: More than just a Hulk of muscle!	
53	2	4	October 1978	The Bee Gees vs. The Beatles! Who's the Greatest?	
54	2	5	November 1978	The Secrets of Battlestar Galactica!	
55	2	6	December 1978	Cruising With The Love Boat Crew!	
56	2	7	January 1979	Mork and Mindy: TV's Out-of-this-World Comedy!	
57	2	8	February 1979	Meet the guys from CHiPs!	
58	2	9	March 1979	Kristy McNichol & Leif Garrett	
59	2	10	April 1979	Dynamite Discoveries of the Year! Christopher Reeve And Lynn-Holly Johnson	
60	2	11	May 1979	Kermit and Miss Piggy: A Muppet love story?	
61	2	12	June 1979	Robin Williams: More than Mork!	
62	3	1	July 1979	All In The Family - Monster Style!	
63	3	2	August 1979	Special Science Fiction Issue! First Preview of Star Wars II!	
64	3	3	September 1979	Face to Face With Erik Estrada	
65	3	4	October 1979	Gary Coleman: TV's Little Big Man	
66	3	5	November 1979	The Dukes of Hazzard	
67	3	6	December 1979	Steve Martin: A Wild and Crazy Guy!	
68	3	7	January 1980	Mork and His New Pals!	
69	3	8	February 1980	Buck Rogers: Then and Now!	
70	3	9	March 1980	Live From New York: It's Gilda Radner!	
71	3	10	April 1980	B.J. and the Bear: A Special Talk with Greg Evigan!	
72	3	11	May 1980	Benji: Hollywood's Top Dog!	
73	3	12	June 1980	Meet John Schneider!	
74	4	1	July 1980	Miss Piggy: A Real Ham at Heart	
75	4	2	August 1980	TV's Top Reruns: The Brady Bunch and More!	
76	4	3	September 1980	The Empire Strikes Back	
77	4	4	October 1980	Shaun Cassidy in Breaking Away	
78	4	5	November 1980	That's Incredible!	
79	4	6	December 1980	Dynamite Spends a Happy Day With Scott Baio!	
80	4	7	January 1981	Meet Tom Wopat of The Dukes of Hazzard!	
81	4	8	February 1981	Gary Coleman Grows Up and Stars in a New Movie!	
82	4	9	March 1981	Buck Rogers and Wilma: TV's Fun Couple of the Future!	
83	4	10	April 1981	Count Morbida's Monstrous Movie Quiz	
84	4	11	May 1981	Bugs Bunny Is Back!	
85	4	12	June 1981	The Great Muppet Caper	
86	5	1	July 1981	TV Kids - Then and Now!	
87	5	2	August 1981	Special Collector's Issue - All About Bummers!	
88	5	3	September 1981	The Greatest American Hero and Superman, Too!	
89	5	4	October 1981	Dynamite Dares to Ride With the Dukes!	
90	5	5	November 1981	Master Magician The Amazing Randi Tells the Truth About the Fakes!	
91	5	6	December 1981	Happy Tenth Birthday, M*A*S*H!	
92	5	7	January 1982	Meet Rick Springfield!	
93	5	8	February 1982	Lee Majors in The Fall Guy: Who Does the Stuntman's Stunts?	
94	5	9	March 1982	Melissa Gilbert All Grown Up!	
95	5	10	April 1982	Lisa Whelchel Tells the Facts of Her Life!	
96	5	11	May 1982	Meet Mr. Merlin's Magic Helper Clark Brandon!	
97	5	12	June 1982	Annie: The Making of the Movie	
98	6	1	July 1982	A Close Encounter with E.T.	
99	6	2	August 1982	Sylvester Stallone: A Chat with the Rocky III Champ!	
100	6	3	September 1982	Joanie Loves Chachi: And Dynamite Loves Them Both!	
101	6	4	October 1982	E.T.: Meet the Creature	
102	6	5	November 1982	The Dark Crystal: An All-New Muppet Creature Feature	
103	6	6	December 1982	Meet Garfield: Heavyweight Champion of Cartoon Cats	
104	6	7	January 1983	Matt Dillon: Tells How His Good Looks Get in His Way	
105	6	8	February 1983	Square Pegs: The Hottest TV Hit of the Year!	
106	6	9	March 1983	MTV: All About TV's Rock and Roll Station	
107	6	10	April 1983	Ricky Schroder: Meet the star of Silver Spoons	
108	6	11	May 1983	Meet Kim Fields: Star of The Facts of Life	
109	6	12	June 1983	The Return of the Jedi: A talk with the man inside C-3PO!	
110	7	1	July 1983	Dynamite's Greatest Hits	
111	7	2	August 1983	Meet David Hasselhoff: Knight Rider's Driving Force	
112	7	3	September 1983	Knight Rider Is Dynamite! An Exclusive Interview with David Hasselhoff	
113	7	4	October 1983	Michael Jackson: A Thriller for Music Fans	
114	7	4	November 1983	Luke Skywalker and Princess Leia: What's Next After Jedi?	
115	7	5	December 1983	Men at Work	
116	7	6	January 1984	Meet "Mr. T": His Look Is Tough - His Heart Is Tender	
117	7	7	February 1984	Gary Coleman: A Talk with TV's Top Teen	
118	7	8	March 1984	Meet Michael J. Fox, Star of Family Ties!	
119	7	9	April 1984	Mr. T - As You've Never Seen Him!	
120	7	10	May 1984	Harrison Ford: The Raiders Star Returns	
121	7	11	June 1984	Supergirl: From the Comics to the Silver Screen!	
122	7	12	July 1984	Dynamite Goes to the Movies	
123	8	1	September 1984	Tops on TV: Webster's Emmanuel Lewis	
124	8	2	October 1984	Scott Baio is Charles in Charge!	
125	8	3	November 1984	Heathcliff!	
126	8	4	January 1985	Backstage at the Bill Cosby Show	
127	8	5	February 1985	Duran Duran	
128	8	6	March 1985	Ralph Macchio: The Karate Kid Star Is a Hit!	
129	9	1	September 1985	How Success Changed The Cosby Show Kids!	
130	9	2	October 1985	Cartoon Cavalcade	
131	9	3	November 1985	Garfield	
132	9	4	January 1986	Punky Brewster!	
133	9	5	February 1986	Bruce Springsteen	
134	9	6	March 1986	Back to the Present With Michael J. Fox!	
135	10	1	September 1986	TV's Favorite Families!	
136	10	2	October 1986	Tony Danza	
137	10	3	November 1986	Most Popular TV Guys!	
138	10	4	January 1987	A Super Michael J. Fox Scrapbook	
139	10	5	February 1987	Chart-Topping Ladies of Rock	
140	10	6	March 1987	Meet Star Students From Head of the Class	
141	11	1	September 1987	Heard It Through the Grapevine: Exclusive interview with a commercial "star"!	
142	11	2	October 1987	Alyssa Milano	
143	11	3	November 1987	Kirk Cameron	
144	11	4	January 1988	Show Biz Siblings: Featuring River Phoenix and Family!	
145	11	5	March 1988	This Is Your Life, Garfield!	
146	12	1	September 1988	A Dynamite Kirk Cameron Photo Album!	
147	12	2	October 1988	Who's the Best? Debbie Gibson vs. Tiffany	
148	12	3	November 1988	Hollywood's Top Teen Talents: Corey Haim and Corey Feldman!	
149	12	4	January 1989	Johnny Depp - TV's Top Cop Star!	
150	12	5	March 1989	A Different World's Jasmine Guy	
151	13	1	September 1989	Exclusive Interview: The Wonder Years' Fred Savage!	
152	13	2	October 1989	Debbie Gibson: Rock's Top Teen!	
153	13	3	November 1989	Dynamite Makes a Full House Call	
154	13	4	January 1990	Meet The Kids of Roseanne!	
155	13	5	March 1990	Cast Your Vote for Favorite TV Starlet!	
156	14	1	September 1990	Paula Abdul!	
157	14	2	October 1990	Basketball Big Shot, Michael "Air" Jordan!	
158	14	3	November 1990	The Simpsons!	
159	14	4	January 1991	New Kids on the Block and a Galaxy of Maurice Starr's Stars!	
160	14	5	March 1991	Candace Cameron!	
161	15	1	September 1991	Will Smith: The Fresh Prince of Bel-Air	
162	15	2	October 1991	Face to Face With Macaulay Culkin!	
163	15	3	November 1991	Family Matters' Jaleel (Urkel) White!	
164	15	4	January 1992	The Cast of Beverly Hills, 90210	
165	15	5	March 1992	Julia Roberts! Arnold Schwarzenegger!	

== See also ==
- Paulina Kernberg, author of Dynamite magazine's "Good Vibrations" advice column
- List of defunct American magazines
