= Canadian Thoracic Society =

Canadian not-for-profit medical association

- Established: 1946
- Founder: C. William L. Jeanes
- Type: Professional association
- Headquarters: Ottawa, Ontario
- President: Richard Leigh
- Website: https://cts-sct.ca/

Canadian Thoracic Society (CTS) is a national not-for-profit medical association representing researchers and healthcare professionals in the field of respirology.

The organization was established by the Canadian Tuberculosis Association, now The Lung Association, to address the need for a medical association as evidenced by the increase in attendance of both medical and non-medical members at the annual meetings.

== History ==
In September 2021, CTS called for legislation to require healthcare workers to receive a COVID-19 vaccine as a condition of continued employment. The position paper published by CTS urged "all levels of government" across Canada to mandate full vaccination, stating it was the most effective way to prevent against serious illness and death from COVID-19.

== Activities ==
CTS publishes clinical practice guidelines (CPG) for care of various respiratory conditions including asthma and chronic obstructive pulmonary disease (COPD).

== Organization ==
CTS is led by a board of directors and executive committee. Previous leadership has included:

=== Board of Directors and Executive Committee ===
- Richard Leigh, President - University of Calgary
- Paul Hernandez, Past President - Dalhousie University
- Mohit Bhutani, President-elect - University of Alberta
- Donna Goodridge, Treasurer - University of Saskatchewan
- Melinda Solomon, Secretary - SickKids/University of Toronto
- Jean Bourdeau, Chair of Business Development - McGill University
- Dina Brooks, Chair of Long-term Planning - McMaster University
- David Gourde, Chair of Canadian Respiratory Health Professionals - Centre intégré universitaire de santé et de services sociaux du Nord-de-l’Île-de-Montréal
- Samir Gupta, Chair of the Canadian Respiratory Guidelines Committee - University of Toronto
- Christopher Hergott, Chair of Education & Continuing Professional Development - University of Calgary
- Larry Lands, Chair of Research - McGill University
- Christopher Li, Chair of Memberships & Communications - University of Toronto
- David Zielinski, Pediatric Assembly Representative - Montreal Children's Hospital/McGill University Health Centre

== See also ==
- Registered Respiratory Therapist
- American College of Chest Physicians
- American Thoracic Society
- Canadian COPD Alliance
- Canadian Respiratory Health Professionals
- Canadian Society of Allergy and Clinical Immunology
- European Respiratory Society
- Guidelines International Network
- Provincial Thoracic Societies
