= Curtis (comic strip) =

American comic strip by Ray Billingsley

- Author: Ray Billingsley
- Website: comicskingdom.com/curtis
- Current status/schedule: Running
- Launch date: October 3, 1988; 37 years ago
- Syndicate(s): King Features Syndicate
- Genre: Humor

Curtis is a nationally syndicated comic strip written and illustrated by Ray Billingsley, with a predominantly African American cast. The comic strip started up on October 3, 1988, and is syndicated by King Features.

The comic strip portrays the daily life of a middle-class family living in a large American city, especially that of Curtis, the eponymous main character. It frequently chronicles aspects of African American culture and history.

Curtis has been compared to Li'l Abner, which Billingsley cites as his favorite comic strip, in style.

== Themes ==
A recurring theme is Curtis' efforts to convince his father to try give up smoking, a personal issue for Billingsley, who is a prominent advocate for public health and the dangers of smoking. For his efforts in educating young people about smoking, Billingsley has earned multiple awards from the American Lung Association.

Though a fundamentally humorous comic, Curtis frequently addresses serious themes. Examples include bullying, drug addiction and gentrification. A storyline in 2020 involved the COVID-19 pandemic.

During the holiday season, Billingsley sometimes deviates from his usual characters to present special two-to-three week stories celebrating the Festival of Kwanzaa. Once an annual tradition in the strip, these specials became irregular in the mid-2010s, with Ray Billingsley citing declining reader interest in them.
