= American Thoracic Society =

Medical society

- Formation: 1905
- Headquarters: New York, New York
- Members: 30,000+
- President: Raed Dweik, MD, ATSF
- Website: https://www.thoracic.org
- Formerly called: American Sanatorium Association 1905-1938; American Trudeau Society 1938-1960

The American Thoracic Society (ATS) is a nonprofit organization focused on improving care for pulmonary diseases, critical illnesses and sleep-related breathing disorders. It was established in 1905 as the

American Sanatorium Association, and changed its name in 1938 to the American Trudeau Society. In 1960, it changed its name again to the American Thoracic Society. Originally the medical section of the American Lung Association, the Society became independently incorporated in 2000 as a 501 (c) (3) organization.

== Medical and scientific areas of interest ==
Pulmonology, critical care, sleep medicine, infectious disease, pediatrics, allergy/immunology, thoracic surgery, behavioral science, environmental and occupational medicine, physiology, molecular biology, among others.

== Membership ==
More than 30,000 physicians, research scientists, and nurses and other allied healthcare professionals (32 percent of whom work outside the United States).

=== ATS Assemblies ===
The interests of members are represented by the Society's 14 specialty-specific assemblies and 2 sections.

=== Chapters and activities ===
With the overarching goal of advancing the Society's mission, each chapter represents a state or other geographical area and includes, in its membership ATS members. The ATS also works to engage its members around the globe.

=== Past Presidents ===
No.	Name	Term
1	William B. Tucker, MD	1960-1961
2	Robert H. Ebert, MD	1961-1962
3	H. William Harris, MD	1962-1963
4	William R. Barclay, MD	1963-1964
5	William S. Schwartz, MD	1964-1965
6	Winthrop N. Davey, MD	1965-1966
7	John S. Chapman, MD	1966-1967
8	Robert L. Yeager, MD	1967-1968
9	Joseph B. Stocklen, MD	1968-1969
10	James F. Hammarsten, MD	1969-1970
11	Eugene D. Robin, MD	1970-1971
12	James Kieran, MD	1971-1972
13	Alan K. Pierce, MD	1972-1973
14	Jay A. Nadel, MD	1973-1974
15	Gareth M. Green, MD	1974-1975
16	Attilio D. Renzetti, Jr., MD	1975-1976
17	Hans Weill, MD	1976-1977
18	Richard L. Riley, MD	1977-1978
19	Donald F. Tierney, MD	1978-1979
20	Marvin A. Sackner, MD	1979-1980
21	Anne L. Davis, MD	1980-1981
22	John F. Murray, MD	1981-1982
23	Robert B. Mellins, MD	1982-1983
24	Roland H. Ingram, Jr., MD	1983-1984
25	Clarence A. Guenter, MD	1984-1985
26	Kenneth M. Moser, MD	1985-1986
27	Gordon L. Snider, MD	1986-1987
28	Gerard M. Turino, MD	1987-1988
29	Joseph H. Bates, MD	1988-1989
30	Kenneth L. Brigham, MD	1989-1990
31	A. Sonia Buist, MD	1990-1991
32	Herbert Y. Reynolds, MD	1991-1992
33	James D. Crapo, MD	1992-1993
34	J.T. Sylvester, MD	1993-1994
35	Gary W. Hunninghake, MD	1994-1995
36	Leonard D. Hudson, MD	1995-1996
37	Philip C. Hopewell, MD	1996-1997
38	Talmadge E. King, Jr., MD	1997-1998
39	Edward R. Block, MD	1998-1999
40	Jeffrey L. Glassroth, MD	1999-2000
41	William J. Martin, II, MD	2000-2001
42	Adam Wanner, MD, ATSF	2001-2002
43	Thomas R. Martin, MD	2002-2003
44	Homer A. Boushey, Jr., MD	2003-2004
45	Sharon I.S. Rounds, MD, ATSF	2004-2005
46	Peter D. Wagner, MD	2005-2006
47	John E. Heffner, MD	2006-2007
48	David H. Ingbar, MD, ATSF	2007-2008
49	Jo Rae Wright, PhD	2008-2009
50	J. Randall Curtis, MD, MPH	2009-2010
51	Dean E. Schraufnagel, MD, ATSF	2010-2011
52	Nicholas S. Hill, MD	2011-2012
53	Monica Kraft, MD, ATSF	2012-2013
54	Patricia W. Finn	2013-2014
55	Thomas W. Ferkol, MD, ATSF	2014-2015
56	Atul Malhotra, MD, ATSF	2015-2016
57	David Gozal, MD, MBA, ATSF	2016-2017
58	Marc Moss, MD, ATSF	2017-2018
59	Polly Parsons, MD, ATSF	2018-2019
60	James Beck, MD, ATSF	2019-2020
61	Juan C. Celedón, MD, DrPH, ATSF	2020-2021
62	Lynn Schnapp, MD, ATSF	2021-2022
63	Greg Downey, MD, ATSF	2022-2023
64	M. Patricia Rivera, MD, ATSF	2023-2024
65	Irina Petrache, MD, ATSF	2024-2025
66	Raed Dweik, MD, ATSF	2025-2026

== Publications and educational activities ==
4 peer-reviewed journals:

- American Journal of Respiratory and Critical Care Medicine
- American Journal of Respiratory Cell and Molecular Biology
- Annals of the American Thoracic Society
- ATS Scholar

The Society offers continuing medical education credits and nursing contact hours through its annual international conference.

The ATS advocates for improved respiratory health for patients in the United States and around the globe. The Society is actively involved securing funds for basic and clinical research, establishing global tuberculosis and tobacco control policies, enforcing the Clean Air Act, and lobbying for fair reimbursement for physician services under Medicare and other insurers.

The ATS Patient Information Series is available electronically on the ATS website.

== See also ==
- American Lung Association
- Edward Livingston Trudeau
