= Registered health information administrator =

American healthcare occupation

Registered health information administrator (RHIA), previously known as registered record administrator, is a professional certification administered by the American Health Information Management Association (AHIMA) in the United States. Passing the exam results in certification for health information management.

== History ==
At the time known as the American Medical Record Association (AMRA), AHIMA began offering the Registered Record Administrator (RRA) certification in the 1970s. In 2000 AHIMA renamed the certification from RRA to Registered Health Information Administrator (RHIA).

== Roles ==
The RHIA certification focuses on preparing members for careers in health information and medical records management, including management of the processes and systems that capture and report on health care-related data so that it can be used to evaluate care performance. They design and manage health information systems to ensure they meet medical, legal, and ethical standards. Seeing that each patient's medical record is complete, kept confidential, and safeguarded from individuals not involved with the medical care of the patient are primary responsibilities.

A RHIA certification is a preferred qualification for positions including health information management director, clinical documentation improvement professional (CDIP), and registered health information administrator. In 2009 a RHIA-certified professional in New York City would earn from $45,000 to $75,000 with a bachelor's degree, and up to $100,000 with a master's degree.

=== RHIA vs. RHIT ===
AHIMA also offers a registered health information technician (RHIT) certification for coding professionals with two-year associate degrees and with less emphasis on management responsibilities. In 2005 researchers found that the differences in these certifications, in addition to other accreditations offered by AHIMA and the need for ongoing training, contributed to inconsistent medical record coding.

== Certification ==
To be eligible for RHIA certification, an individual must complete a bachelor's degree in a health information management program accredited by the Commission on Accreditation for Health Informatics and Information Management Education (CAHIIM) or graduate from a foreign association that has a reciprocity agreement with AHIMA. Students focus on a core content area: technology, management development, clinical data management, performance improvement, external forces, clinical foundations, or privacy and security.

In response to industry demand for health information administrators, some programs began offering accelerated, CAHIIM-accredited postbaccalaureate certificates in health information administration in 2000 to allow experienced enrollees, such as former nurses or business analysts with Master of Business Administration (MBA), to more quickly take the RHIA exam.

A temporary Proviso has been implemented by the CCHIIM that any registered health information technicians (RHIT) who meet the following eligibility requirements will be eligible to sit for the RHIA examination during the timeframe of July 1, 2017 through 2021:

- Have at least a baccalaureate degree from a regionally accredited institution or nationally recognized accreditor; and
- Have received their RHIT credential on or before August 31, 2018; and
- Have complied with the Standards for Maintenance of the RHIT credential.

=== Ongoing education ===
Maintaining a RHIA certification requires 30 hours of continuing education units (CEUs) every two years. Of the 30 hours, 80% (or 24 hours) must be in one of the core content areas.
