= Accumulation =

Accumulation may refer to:

== Finance ==
- Accumulation function, a mathematical function defined in terms of the ratio future value to present value
- Capital accumulation, the gathering of objects of value

== Science and engineering ==
- Accumulate (higher-order function), a family of functions to analyze a recursive data structure in computer science
- Bioaccumulation, of substances, such as pesticides or other chemicals in an organism
- Glacier ice accumulation, an element in the glacier mass balance formula
- Metabolic trapping, a localization mechanism of the synthesized radiocompounds in human body
- Tree accumulation, in computer science, the process of accumulating data placed in tree nodes according to their tree structure
- Accumulation point, another name for a limit point
- Cumulative sum, for example cumulative distribution function, or cumulative death toll, summarized since start of a catastrophe

== Other ==
- Accumulation: None, a 2002 lo-fi album
- Accumulatio, a figure of speech

== See also ==
- Accumulator (disambiguation)
