= ACC =

ACC most often refers to:

- Atlantic Coast Conference, an NCAA Division I collegiate athletic conference in the US
- American College of Cardiology, a US-based nonprofit medical association that bestows credentials upon cardiovascular specialists
- Association of Corporate Counsel, a global organization serving attorneys who practice in corporate law departments
- American Chemistry Council, an industry trade association for American chemical companies

ACC may also refer to:

== Arts and culture ==
- Australian Copyright Council, a non-profit organisation dedicated to promoting understanding of copyright law
- Adobe Creative Cloud, a software suite for graphic design, video editing, web development and photography
- Advent Children Complete, the director's cut of the 2005 film Final Fantasy VII: Advent Children
- American Country Countdown, a weekly syndicated radio program about music
- Angel City Chorale, a Los Angeles choir
- American Craft Council, an American education-focused non-profit based in Minneapolis, Minnesota
- Arab Cinema Center, a nonprofit organisation promoting Arab cinema
- Asia Culture Center, a South Korean research institution and art venue
- Asian Cultural Council, a New York–based foundation promoting cultural exchange between the US and Asia

== Biology and medicine ==
- Agenesis of the corpus callosum, when the brain's hemisphere-connecting white matter is missing or malformed
- Anterior cingulate cortex, the frontal part of the cingulate cortex
- Adrenocortical carcinoma, also called "adrenal cortex cancer"
- Adenoid cystic carcinoma (also abbreviated AdCC), a rare glandular tumor that primarily appears in the salivary glands
- ACC, one of the genetic codons of threonine
- Acetyl-CoA carboxylase, an enzyme that turns acetyl-CoA into malonyl-CoA
- 1-Aminocyclopropane-1-carboxylic acid, an intermediate in the biological synthesis of ethylene
- Aortic cross-clamp, a surgical instrument used in cardiac surgery to clamp the aorta
- American College of Cardiology, a DC-based nonprofit healthcare association that bestows credentials upon cardiovascular specialists
- Accredited Clinical Coder, an NHS-recognized professional designation in the UK

== Christianity ==
- Anglican Catholic Church, a body of Anglican Christians not in the Anglican Communion
- Anglican Church of Canada, a church of the Anglican Communion
- Anglican Consultative Council, an international body of the Anglican Communion
- Apostolic Catholic Church (Philippines), a self-governing church of Catholic Protestants originating in the Philippines
- Apostolic Christian Church, a church of Anabaptist origins
- Associated Catholic Colleges, a group of boys schools in Victoria, Australia
- Atlanta Christian College, now Point University, a university near Atlanta, Georgia, in the US
- Australian Christian Channel, a television channel in Australia
- Australian Christian Churches, also known as Assemblies of God in Australia (AOG)
- Australian Christian College, a group of schools in Australia

== Construction ==
- ACC Limited, an Indian cement manufacturer
- Asia Cement Corporation, a cement company in Taiwan
- American Campus Communities, a private student housing provider

== Earth science and ecology ==
- Antarctic Circumpolar Current, an ocean current
- Anthropogenic climate change, a.k.a. anthropogenic global warming, climate change caused by humans
- American Conservation Coalition, a nonprofit environmental advocacy organisation

== Education ==
- Accreditation Committee of Cambodia, higher education quality and assessment body in Cambodia
- Accredited Clinical Coder, a vocational qualification in the UK
- Adamjee Cantonment College, an institution in Bangladesh
- Adirondack Community College, now SUNY Adirondack, a two-year college in New York in the US
- Allegany Community College, now Allegany College of Maryland in the US
- Alvin Community College, a community college in Alvin, Texas, in the US
- American Campus Communities, a private student housing provider
- American College of Cardiology, a non-profit medical organization
- American Craft Council, a non-profit educational organization
- Arapahoe Community College, in Littleton, Colorado, in the US
- Army Cadet College, a defence training establishment in India, now in Dehradun
- Asnuntuck Community College, a community college in Enfield, Connecticut, in the US
- Assiniboine Community College, a community college in Brandon, Manitoba, in Canada
- Atlanta Christian College, now Point University, a university near Atlanta, Georgia, in the US
- Austin Community College, a community college in the Austin, Texas, area in the US
- Australian Christian College, a group of schools in Australia

== Finance and food ==
- Americans for Common Cents, a pro-penny lobbying organisation in the US
- ACCBank, an Irish commercial bank
- American Credit Corporation, renamed Barclays American
- Alaska Commercial Company, American retail and grocery company
- Associated Co-operative Creameries, or one of its successors:
  - ACC Milk, part of Dairy Farmers of Britain, and
  - Co-operative Retail Logistics, a division of Co-operative Group Ltd.
- Army Catering Corps, a unit of the British Army, formed in 1941, amalgamated into the Royal Logistic Corps in 1993

== Government and military ==
- Accident Compensation Corporation, a New Zealand state insurance agency
- Adelaide City Council, a local government area in the metropolitan area of Adelaide, South Australia
- Air Combat Command, the primary provider of air combat forces for the US Air Force
- Allied Clandestine Committee, a 1957 founded NATO organisation
- Allied Control Commission, or Allied Commission, a type of commission consisting of representatives of the major Allied Powers in World War II
- Allied Control Council, a military occupation governing body in Germany after the end of World War II
- Anti Corruption Commission Bangladesh, an independent, semi-governmental commission
- Appointments Committee of the Cabinet, a government committee that decides appointments to several top posts in the Government of India
- Arizona Corporation Commission, a public utility regulator in Arizona
- Army Cadet College, a defence training establishment in India, now in Dehradun
- Army Catering Corps, a corps of the British Army responsible for the feeding of all army units
- United States Army Contracting Command, contracting services provider of the US Army
- United States Army Corrections Command
- Assistant Chief Constable, a British police rank
- Australian Crime Commission, former name of one of the components of the Australian Criminal Intelligence Commission

== Mathematics and computing ==
- Ascending chain condition, a potential property of a partially ordered set
- ACC (complexity), a class of computational models and problems defined in circuit complexity
- ACC (programming language), a compiler for use under the MS-DOS operating system
- ACC Microelectronics Corporation, a defunct American semiconductor company
- AMD 700 chipset series § Advanced Clock Calibration, a technology that enables higher CPU clock speeds

== Political groups ==
- Arab Cooperation Council, an Arab economic organization set up as a rival to the Gulf Cooperation Council (GCC)
- Association of Conservative Clubs, an organisation associated with the Conservative Party in the UK
- Anti-Capitalist Convergence, organisations in North America which coordinated activities by the social justice, anarchist and environmentalist anti-capitalists
- The Atlantic Council of Canada, an NGO promoting the North Atlantic Treaty Organization (NATO) in Canada

== Sports ==
=== Collegiate athletics ===
- Associated Catholic Colleges, an Australian Schools Sporting Association
- Atlantic Coast Conference, an NCAA Division I collegiate athletic conference in the US
- Athletic & Convocation Center, a University of Notre Dame facility

=== Cricket ===
- Aberdeenshire Cricket Club, a club based in Aberdeen, Scotland
- Asian Cricket Council, an organisation whose aim is to promote and develop the game of cricket within Asia

=== Football ===
- AFC Challenge Cup, an international football competition for Asian Football Confederation (AFC) member countries
- Amway Canadian Championship, an annual soccer tournament contested by Canadian professional teams
- Asian Club Championship, an association football competition organised by the Asian Football Confederation

=== Sports involving vehicles ===
- Asian Cycling Confederation, the confederation of cycling's national governing bodies in Asia
- Assetto Corsa Competizione, the official PC racing simulation of the 2018 Blancpain GT Series
- America's Cup Class, a sailboat class

=== Other uses in sports ===
- ACC Liverpool, an arena and convention centre in Liverpool
- Air Canada Centre, former name of Scotiabank Arena, in Toronto, Ontario, Canada
- Alpine Club of Canada, Canada's national mountaineering organization

== Transportation ==
=== Aviation ===
- Air Combat Command, a major command of the US Air Force headquartered at Langley Air Force Base
- Another Course to College, a pilot school in Boston, Massachusetts, in the US
- Area control center, a type of air traffic control facility
- Accra International Airport in Greater Accra Region, Ghana (IATA airport code ACC)
- Active clearance control, an engine temperature control

=== Cars ===
- Touring and Automobile Club of Colombia (Spanish: Touring & Automovil Club de Colombia), a motoring club and member of the Fédération Internationale de l'Automobile in South America
- Automotive Cells Company, a manufacturer for EV batteries in europe
- Active Cylinder Control, a variable displacement technology
- Autonomous/adaptive cruise control
- Automatic climate control, a type of automobile air conditioning

=== Trains ===
- Acton Central railway station, on the North London Line (station code ACC)

== Other uses ==
- Association of Corporate Counsel, an organization serving attorneys who practice in the corporate law
- American Chemistry Council, an industry trade association for American chemical companies
- Annenberg Center for Communication, a research center at the University of Southern California in the US
- Achi language, a Mayan language of Guatemala (ISO 639-3 code ACC)
- ACC, in linguistics, glossing abbreviation for accusative case, used for direct objects

== See also ==
- Accelerator (disambiguation)
- Accumulator (disambiguation)
