= NCCI =

NCCI may refer to:

- National Council on Compensation Insurance
- National Correct Coding Initiative
- National Council of Churches in India
- Non-Contradictory Complementary Information, guidance for structural design to complement the Eurocodes
