= CollaborateMD =

American software company

- Type: Private
- Industry: Software
- Founded: 1999; 27 years ago
- Founders: Douglas Kegler
- Headquarters: Orlando, Florida, U.S.
- Revenue: US$11,600,000 (2016)
- Website: www.collaboratemd.com

CollaborateMD is a private company that provides cloud-based medical billing and practice management software services for independent medical practices and hospitals. The company's software uses real-time claim submission and built-in edits and integrates with various electronic health records (EHRs).

The company's headquarters are based in Orlando, Florida.

== History ==
The company was founded in 1999, by Douglas Kegler, who previously used to code dental and medical billing programs.

In April 2008, the company changed its former name XGear Technologies, Inc. to CollaborateMD, Inc. As of 2017, the company has processed over $46 billion worth of medical claims for 20 million patients.

In 2019, the company was acquired by EverCommerce.
