= Foresight Hospital and Health Systems =

Healthcare operator and service provider

- Company type: Private
- Industry: Healthcare
- Founded: 2022
- Founder: Sameer Suhail
- Headquarters: Illinois, United States
- Key people: Sameer Suhail (CEO)
- Website: www.foresighthealth.us

Foresight Hospital and Health Systems is an American healthcare operator and service provider. Founded in Illinois, Foresight Hospital and Health Systems provides health care services to underserved rural and urban communities, while changing the landscape of health care service delivery and accessibility.

In early 2022, CEO and founder, Sameer Suhail, opened Foresight Hospital and Health Systems in Stuart, Virginia in response to a need for healthcare services.

== History ==
Patrick County residents have been without local emergency medical care since September 2017. The Patrick County Hospital, closed in 2017 after filing for bankruptcy in 2016, leaving the county without a hospital. In 2022, in response to a great need for healthcare services in Roanoke County, the founder, Sameer Suhail decided to acquire and build a new hospital.

Chicago-based company named Foresight HS Property Holdings – Blue Ridge, LLC bought the property in April 2022. The deed to the property was previously held by Patrick County Real Estate, LLC. A spokesperson for Chicago-based Foresight HS Property Holdings – Blue Ridge, LLC confirmed that a purchase agreement for the vacant hospital campus is in place and that "Foresight has plans to move forward with a new healthcare facility".

== Services ==
Foresight Hospital and Health Systems provides medical billing, coding and collections services, oversight of outpatient pharmacy operations, and aid with the procurement of medical equipment and supplies. The healthcare operator also has an extensive and expanding behavioral health division, which manages and will soon own inpatient and outpatient psychiatric service lines.
