= MUE =

Mue is a 2014 album by Émilie Simon.

Mue or MUE may refer to:

- Mue, a tributary of the river Seulles in Normandy, France
- Medically Unlikely Edit, in US Medicare
- Miyagi University of Education, a university in Japan
- Waimea-Kohala Airport (IATA code and FAA LID: MUE)
- Magyar Úszó Egylet, Hungarian football club (MÚE)
- Media Lengua, language used in Ecuador, ISO code mue
