= Medical-bill advocacy =

Medical-bill advocacy is the name generally attributed to the industry that has developed in response to a growing problem of erroneous charges on medical bills. According to the Medical Billing Advocates of America (MBAA), as many as 9 out of 10 bills from hospitals and medical providers include errors that may erroneously inflate the cost of actual healthcare received.

== Overview ==
Medical bill advocates help patients find errors in their bills, negotiate with their insurer to appeal coverage denials, and/or negotiate lower fees with their medical care providers.

The older citations on this page refer to a directory at Medical Billing Advocates of America. In August 2017 its Facebook page and web page forwarded to Medliminal, which is one company among others. The broader associations, Alliance of Professional Health Advocates, and National Association of Healthcare Advocacy Consultants include insurance billing advocates in their directories.

The Patient Advocate Certification Board lists certified advocates, all of whom are required to have a general knowledge of medical billing and insurance to make a referral. Some specialize in this, but the Board site does not identify them.

== Common medical bill errors ==
Examples of common medical bill errors identified by advocates include the following:

- Duplicate billing: charging twice for the same service, drugs, or supplies
- Typos: entering incorrect billing codes or dollar amounts
- Canceled work: charging for a test your doctor ordered, then canceled
- Upcoding: inflating a charge, for example, a doctor prescribes a generic drug, but the bill lists a costlier, brand-name drug
- Inflated operating room fees: charging for more time than the anesthesiologist's records show was used.

== See also ==
- Medical bills
