= USACC =

USACC may refer to:

== Military ==
- United States Army Chaplain Corps, branch of the United States Army for religious services
- United States Army Cadet Command
- United States Army Communications Command, predecessor to the United States Army Network Enterprise Technology Command

== Other uses ==
- U.S.-Azerbaijan Chamber of Commerce, a lobbying group for Azerbaijan business interests in the United States

== See also ==
- ACC
- Us
