= Clinical coder =

Health worker who classifies diagnoses

Clinical Coder
Occupation
- Synonyms: Medical Coder, Clinical Coding Officer, Coder (informal)
- Occupation type: Health Information Management
- Activity sectors: Healthcare

Description
- Competencies: Medical classification, Procedural classification
- Fields of employment: Hospital, Clinic
- Related jobs: Medical billing, Nosology

A clinical coder—also known as clinical coding officer, diagnostic coder, medical coder, or nosologist—is a health information professional whose main duties are to analyse clinical statements and assign standardized codes using a classification system. The health data produced are an integral part of health information management, and are used by local and national governments, private healthcare organizations and international agencies for various purposes, including medical and health services research, epidemiological studies, health resource allocation, case mix management, public health programming, medical billing, and public education.

For example, a clinical coder may use a set of published codes on medical diagnoses and procedures, such as the International Classification of Diseases (ICD), the Healthcare Common procedural Coding System (HCPCS), and Current Procedural Terminology (CPT) for reporting to the health insurance provider of the recipient of the care. The use of standard codes allows insurance providers to map equivalencies across different service providers who may use different terminologies or abbreviations in their written claims forms, and be used to justify reimbursement of fees and expenses. The codes may cover topics related to diagnoses, procedures, pharmaceuticals or topography. The medical notes may also be divided into specialities, for example cardiology, gastroenterology, nephrology, neurology, pulmonology or orthopedic care. There are also specialist manuals for oncology known as ICD-O (International Classification of Diseases for Oncology) or "O Codes", which are also used by tumor registrars (who work with cancer registries), as well as dental codes for dentistry procedures known as "D codes" for further specifications.

A clinical coder therefore requires a good knowledge of medical terminology, anatomy and physiology, a basic knowledge of clinical procedures and diseases and injuries and other conditions, medical illustrations, clinical documentation (such as medical or surgical reports and patient charts), legal and ethical aspects of health information, health data standards, classification conventions, and computer- or paper-based data management, usually as obtained through formal education and/or on-the-job training.

== In practice ==
The basic task of a clinical coder is to classify medical and health care concepts using a standardised classification. Inpatient, mortality events, outpatient episodes, general practitioner visits and population health studies can all be coded.

Clinical coding has three key phases: a) abstraction; b) assignment; and c) review.

=== Abstraction ===
The abstraction phase involves reading the entire record of the health encounter and analysing the information to determine what condition(s) the patient had, what caused it and how it was treated. The information comes from a variety of sources within the medical record, such as clinical notes, laboratory and radiology results, and operation notes.

=== Assignment ===
The assignment phase has two parts: finding the appropriate code(s) from the classification for the abstraction; and entering the code into the system being used to collect the coded data.

=== Review ===
Reviewing the code set produced from the assignment phase is very important. Clinical coder must ask themselves, "does this code set fairly represent what happened to this patient in this health encounter at this facility?" By doing this, clinical coders are checking that they have covered everything that they must, but not used extraneous codes. For health encounters that are funded through a case mix mechanism, the clinical coder will also review the diagnosis-related group (DRG) to ensure that it does fairly represent the health encounter.

== Competency levels ==
Clinical coders may have different competency levels depending on the specific tasks and employment setting.

=== Entry-level / trainee coder ===
An entry-level coder has completed (or nearly completed) an introductory training program in using clinical classifications. Training requirements vary by country. A certificate or degree may be required before a trainee begins clinical coding. Trainee coders may also receive ongoing, supervised instruction in the workplace from experienced coders.

=== Intermediate-level coder ===
Intermediate-level coders have developed the skills required to code a range of cases independently, including those involving incomplete information. They possess a working knowledge of anatomy, physiology and disease processes, which supports their ability to interpret medical documentation and assign appropriate codes. Their work is periodically audited by advanced coders to assess coding accuracy and compliance with established standards.

=== Advanced-level / senior coder ===
Advanced-level and senior coders are authorized to code all cases including the most complex. Advanced coders will usually be credentialed and will have several years of experience. An advanced coder is also able to train entry-level coders.

=== Nosologist ===
A nosologist understands how the classification is underpinned. Nosologists consult nationally and internationally to resolve issues in the classification and are viewed as experts who can not only code, but design and deliver education, assist in the development of the classification and the rules for using it.

Nosologists are usually expert in more than one classification, including morbidity, mortality and case mix. In some countries the term nosologist is used as a catch-all term for all levels.

== Classification types ==
Clinical coders may use many different classifications, which fall into two main groupings: statistical classifications and nomenclatures.

=== Statistical classification ===
A statistical classification, such as ICD-10 or DSM-5, will bring together similar clinical concepts, and group them into one category. This allows the number of categories to be limited so that the classification does not become too big, but still allows statistical analysis. An example of this is in ICD-10 at code I47.1. The code title (or rubric) is Supraventricular tachycardia. However, there are several other clinical concepts that are also classified here. Amongst them are paroxysmal atrial tachycardia, paroxysmal junctional tachycardia, auricular tachycardia and nodal tachycardia.

=== Nomenclature ===
With a nomenclature, for example SNOMED CT, there is a separate listing and code for every clinical concept. So, in the tachycardia example above, each type and clinical term for tachycardia would have its own code listed. This makes nomenclatures unwieldy for compiling health statistics.

== Qualification and professional association ==
In some countries, clinical coders may seek voluntary certification or accreditation through assessments conducted by professional associations, health authorities or, in some instances, universities. The options available to the coder will depend on the country, and, occasionally, even between states within a country.

Professional bodies that provide certification for clinical coders may also represent other health information management professionals.

=== Australia ===
- Clinical Coders' Society of Australia (CCSA)
- Health Information Management Association of Australia (HIMAA)

=== Canada ===
- Canadian Health Information Management Association (CHIMA)

=== Saudi Arabia ===
- Saudi Health Information Management Association (SHIMA)

=== United Kingdom ===
Clinical coders start as trainees, and there are no conversion courses for coders immigrating to the United Kingdom.

The National Clinical Coding Qualification (NCCQ) is an exam for experienced coders, and is recognised by the four health agencies of the UK. Institute of Health Records and Information Management (IHRIM) are the awarding body.

==== England ====
In England, a novice coder will complete the national standards course written by NHS Digital within six months of being in post. They will then start working towards the NCCQ.

Three years after passing the NCCQ, two further professional qualifications are made available to the coder in the form of NHS Digital's clinical coding auditor and trainer programmes.

==== Scotland ====
In 2015, National Services Scotland, in collaboration with Health Boards, launched the Certificate of Technical Competence (CTC) in Clinical Coding (Scotland). Awarded by the Institute of Health Records & Information Management (IHRIM), the aims of the certificate include supporting staff new to clinical coding, and providing a standardised framework of clinical coding training across NHS Scotland.

The NCCQ is a recognized coding qualification in Scotland.

==== Wales ====
The NCCQ is a recognized coding qualification by NHS Wales.

==== Northern Ireland ====
Health and Social Care in Northern Ireland recognizes the NCCQ as a coding qualification.

=== United States ===
As of 2016, the typical qualification for an entry-level medical coder in the United States is completion of a diploma or certificate, or, where they are offered, an associate degree. The diploma, certificate, or degree will usually always include an Internet-based and/or in-person internship at some form of a medical office or facility. Some form of on-the-job training is also usually provided in the first months on the job until the coder can earn an intermediate or advanced level of certification and accumulate time on the job. For further academic training, a baccalaureate or master's degree in medical information technology, or a related field, can be earned by those who wish to advance to a supervisory or academic role. A nosologist (medical coding expert) in the U.S. will usually be certified by either AHIMA or the AAPC (often both) at their highest level of certification and speciality inpatient and/or outpatient certification (pediatrics, obstetrics/gynecology, gerontology, oncology are among those offered by AHIMA and/or the AAPC), have at least 3–5 years of intermediate experience beyond entry-level certification and employment, and often holds an associate, bachelor's, or graduate degree.

There are several associations that medical coders in the United States may join, including:

- AAPC (formerly American Academy of Professional Coders)
- American Board of Health Care Professionals (ABHCP)
- American Health Information Management Association (AHIMA)

Some medical coders elect to be certified by more than one society.

The AAPC offers the following entry-level certifications in the U.S.: Certified Professional Coder (CPC); which tests on most areas of medical coding, and also the Certified Inpatient Coder (CIC) and Certified Outpatient Coder (COC). Both the CPC and COC have apprentice designations (CPC-A and COC-A, respectively) for those who pass the certification exams but do not have two years of on the job experience. There is no apprentice designation available for the CIC. After completing two years of on the job experience the apprentice credential holder can request to have the apprentice designation removed from their credential. There are also further specialist coding certifications, for example, the CHONC credential for those who specialize in hematology and oncology coding and the CASCC credential for those who specialize in ambulatory surgery center coding.

The other main organization is American Health Information Management Association (AHIMA) which offers the Certified Coding Specialist (CCS), Certified Coding Specialist-Physician-based (CCS-P), and the entry-level Certified Coding Associate (CCA).

Some U.S. states now mandate or at least strongly encourage certification from either AAPC or AHIMA or a degree from a college to be employed. Some states have registries of medical coders, though these can be voluntary listings. This trend was accelerated in part by the passage of HIPAA and the Affordable Care Act and similar changes in other Western countries, many of which use the ICD-10 for diagnostic medical coding. The change to more regulation and training has also been driven by the need to create accurate, detailed, and secure medical records (especially patient charts, bills, and claim form submissions) that can be recorded efficiently in an electronic era of medical records where they need to be carefully shared between different providers or institutions of care. This was encouraged and later required by legislation and institutional policy.

== See also ==
- Clinical medicine
- Current Procedural Terminology
- Diagnosis-related group
- Diagnostic and Statistical Manual of Mental Disorders (DSM)
- Health informatics
- International Classification of Diseases (ICD)
  - ICD-11
  - ICD-10
- Medical diagnosis
- Pathology Messaging Implementation Project
- WHO Family of International Classifications
