= Clinical documentation improvement =

Process of improving healthcare records

Clinical documentation improvement (CDI), also known as "clinical documentation integrity", is the best practices, processes, technology, people, and joint effort between providers and billers that advocates the completeness, precision, and validity of provider documentation inherent to transaction code sets (e.g. ICD-10-CM, ICD-10-PCS, CPT, HCPCS) sanctioned by the Health Insurance Portability and Accountability Act in the United States.

The profession was developed in response to the Centers for Medicare and Medicaid Services (CMS) Diagnostic-Related Group (DRG) system in 1983 and gained greater notice around 2007 with CMS's transition to Medicare-Severity Diagnosis-Related Groups. With the expansion of risk-adjusted value-based payment and quality measures and increasing accountability by regulatory agencies, CDI now impacts at least 20 different models affecting payers, facilities, and providers.

CDI professionals act as intermediaries between Inpatient coders who translate diagnoses into data and healthcare providers and nurses. As many clinical coders don't have patient care backgrounds, and healthcare providers might not realize the importance of accurate documentation, the CDI professional serves to make the connection between these two groups. CDI professionals should be familiar with Medicare Severity DRGs (MS-DRG) ICD-9 to ICD-10 coding.

The Association of Clinical Documentation Integrity Specialists (ACDIS), part of Simplify Compliance, LLC, is a provider of integrated information, education, training, and consulting products and services in healthcare regulation and compliance. ACDIS provides the Certified Clinical Documentation Specialist (CCDS) and CCDS-Outpatient (CCDS-O) certifications, CDI boot camps, online learning, books, and webinars. The Association for Integrity in Health Care Documentation (AIHCD) offers a C-CDI certification. The American Health Information Management Association (AHIMA), which also offers the certified documentation improvement professional (CDIP) credential.

To remain competitive in the value-based care ecosystem, hospitals depend on the CDIS. To support reimbursements, payers rely on clinical documentation and precise coding. Additionally, a lack of information or assigning DRGs with a lower relative weight may cause hospitals to lose out on reimbursements and face value-based penalties. There have been cases where healthcare providers missed out on incentive payments due to a lack of achievement documentation to show payers.

Hospitals can prevent such mishaps by leveraging a skilled CDI team. According to a 2016 Black Book Market Research survey, almost 90% of hospitals that employed a strong CDI program with skilled specialists earned at least $1.5 million more through reimbursements and healthcare revenue. Most of the additional revenue came from improving key performance indicators (KPIs) such as the Case Mix Index (CMI) through CDI.

Healthcare documentation serves as a legal document, validates the patient care provided, facilitates claims processing, coding, billing and reimbursement, and facilitates quality reviews.

== See also ==
- Clinical coder
- Electronic health record
- Health care
- Health informatics
- Health information management
- Health information technology
- Hospital information system
