= AAPC (healthcare) =

American professional association

- Abbreviation: AAPC
- Formation: 1988
- Purpose: Healthcare administrator training and certification
- Headquarters: Salt Lake City, Utah
- Region served: United States
- Services: Certification, training, conferences
- Members: 300,000 (2025)
- Official language: English
- Chief executive officer: Bevan Erickson
- Website: www.aapc.com
- Formerly called: American Academy of Professional Coders

The AAPC, previously known by the full title of the American Academy of Professional Coders, is a professional association for people working in specific areas of administration within healthcare businesses in the United States. AAPC is one of a number of providers who offer services such as certification and training to medical coders, medical billers, auditors, compliance managers, and practice managers in the United States. As of September 2025, AAPC has over 300,000 worldwide members.

== History ==
The AAPC was founded in 1988, as the American Academy of Professional Coders, with the aim of providing education and certification to coders working in physician-based settings. These settings include group practices and specialty centers (i.e. non-hospital settings). In 2010, as their services had expanded beyond medical and outpatient coding, the full name was dropped in favor of the AAPC initialism.

== Products and services ==
AAPC provides training, certification, and other services to individuals and organizations across medical coding, medical billing, auditing, compliance, and practice management. These services include networking events such as medical coding seminars and conferences.

=== Certifications ===
AAPC offers a number of certifications for healthcare professionals, including:

- Medical coding and medical billing, including stand-alone certifications in over 20 specialty areas,
- Medical auditing
- Medical compliance
- Physician practice management

== See also ==
- Health informatics
- Information governance
- Medical classification
