= Release of information department =

A release of information (ROI) department or division is found in the majority of hospitals. In the United States, HIPAA and state guidelines strongly direct the rules and regulations of patient information. ROI departments perform such tasks as obtaining patient consent, certifying medical records, and deciding what information can be released.

The ROI department is often found within the health information management services (HIMS) department of a hospital. The oversight of the HIMS department is usually overseen by a director. The director of health information may have credentials such as RHIT (registered health information technician) or RHIA (registered health information administrator).

Special federal regulations protect the release of information in the areas of mental health, drug treatment, and alcohol treatment. Records of this nature often require either a patient's consent or a court order for their release. ROI staff must possess a strong acumen for the legal rights of the patient.

== See also ==
- Medical records department
