= National Correct Coding Initiative =

The National Correct Coding Initiative (NCCI) is a Centers for Medicare & Medicaid Services (CMS) program designed to prevent improper payment of procedures that should not be submitted together.

There are two categories of edits:

- Physician Edits: these code pair edits apply to physicians, non-physician practitioners, and Ambulatory Surgery Centers
- Hospital Outpatient Prospective Payment System Edits (Outpatient Edits): these edits apply to the following types of bills: Hospitals (12X and 13X), Skilled Nursing Facilities (22X and 23X), Home Health Agencies Part B (34X), Outpatient Physical Therapy and Speech Language Pathology Providers (74X), and Comprehensive Outpatient Rehabilitation Facilities (75X).

Both the physician and outpatient edits can be split into two further code pair categories:

- Column1/Column2 Code Pairs: these code pairs were created to identify unbundled services. The name is derived from the fact that the code pairs are separated into two columns; Column 1 contains the most comprehensive code, and Column 2 contains component services already covered by that more comprehensive code. These code pairs are further categorized into two sets:
  - Modifier: the appropriate use of a modifier allows these code pair to be reported together. In most cases, the -59 modifier is used, although there are other acceptable modifiers. These modifiers must be supported by documentation in the medical record.
  - No Modifiers: these code pairs should never be reported together, regardless of modifiers.
- Mutually Exclusive Code Pairs (MEC): these code pairs should not be reported together because they are mutually exclusive of each other.

NCCI code pairs must match on member, provider, and date of service. CMS maintains tables of code pair edits and updates these tables on a quarterly basis.

== See also ==
- Medically Unlikely Edit
