= Health information management =

Information management applied to health and health care

Health information management (HIM) is information management applied to health and health care. It is the practice of analyzing and protecting digital and traditional medical information vital to providing quality patient care. With the widespread computerization of health records, traditional (paper-based) records are being replaced with electronic health records (EHRs).The tools of health informatics and health information technology are continually improving to bring greater efficiency to information management in the health care sector.

Health information management professionals plan information systems, develop health policy, and identify current and future information needs. In addition, they may apply the science of informatics to the collection, storage, analysis, use, and transmission of information to meet legal, professional, ethical, and administrative records-keeping requirements of health care delivery. They work with clinical, epidemiological, demographic, financial, reference, and coded healthcare data. Health information administrators have been described to "play a critical role in the delivery of healthcare in the United States through their focus on the collection, maintenance and use of quality data to support the information-intensive and information-reliant healthcare system".

== History and development in the United States ==
=== Establishment of AHIMA ===
The history of health information management standards is dated to the introduction of the American Health Information Management Association, founded in 1928, "when the American College of Surgeons established the Association of Record Librarians of North America (ARLNA) to 'elevate the standards of clinical records in hospitals and other medical institutions.'"

In 1938, AHIMA was known as the American Association of Medical Record Librarians (AAMRL), and its members were known as medical record experts or librarians who studied medical record science. The goal was to raise the standards of records keeping in hospitals and other healthcare facilities. The individuals involved in this profession were promoters for the successful management of clinical records to guarantee accuracy and precision. Over time, the organization's name changed to reflect the evolving field of health information management practices, eventually becoming the American Health Information Management Association. The association's current name is meant to cover the wide variety of areas in which health professionals work today.

AHIMA members affect the quality of patient information and patient care at every touch point in the healthcare delivery cycle. They often serve in bridge roles, connecting clinical, operational, and administrative functions.

=== Establishment of HIMSS ===
The Healthcare Information and Management Systems Society (HIMSS) was organized in 1961 as the Hospital Management Systems Society (HMSS), an independent, unincorporated, nonprofit, voluntary association of individuals. It was preceded by increasing amounts of management engineering activity in healthcare during the 1950s, when the teachings of Frederick Winslow Taylor and Frank Bunker Gilbreth, Sr. began to attract the attention of health leaders.

The HIMSS grew to include chapters, membership categories, publications, conventions, and continues to grow in different parts of the world via its branches in Europe, Asia-Pacific, and the Middle East.

=== Development of accredited HIM educational programs ===
The Commission on Accreditation for Health Informatics and Information Management Education (CAHIIM) defines standards which higher education health information management and technology programs must meet to qualify for accreditation. Students who graduate from an accredited associate's, bachelor's or certificate program are qualified to sit for their respective exams for certification as a Registered Health Information Technician (RHIT) – via graduation from an accredited associate or certification program or Registered Health Information Administrator (RHIA), which requires education through an accredited bachelor or certification program. Competency requirements are maintained by CAHIIM in their associate degree Entry-Level Competencies and Baccalaureate Degree Entry-Level Competencies definitions.

== Modern development ==
The World Health Organization (WHO) stated that the proper collection, management and use of information within healthcare systems "will determine the system's effectiveness in detecting health problems, defining priorities, identifying innovative solutions and allocating resources to improve health outcomes".

=== Electronic health records ===
The electronic health record has been continually expressed as an evolution of health record-keeping. Because it is electronic, this means of record keeping has been both supported and debated in the health professional community and within the public realm.

In the United States, 89% of those who responded to a poll by The Wall Street Journal described themselves as "Very/Somewhat Confident" in their health care provider who used electronic health records, compared to 71% of respondents who responded positively about their providers who didn't or don't use electronic health records. As of 2008, more than fifty percent of chief information officers polled listed that they wanted ambulatory electronic health records in order to have the health information record available to move across each stage of health care.

Health information managers are charged with the protection of patient privacy and are responsible for training their employees in the proper handling and usage of the confidential information entrusted to them. With the rising importance of technology in healthcare, health information managers must remain competent with the use of information databases that generate crucial reports for administrators and physicians.

=== Educational programs ===
The requisites and accreditation processes for health information management education and professional activity vary across jurisdictions.

In the United States, the CAHIIM requires continued accreditation for accredited programs in health information management. The current standard is that accreditation may be maintained with periodic site visits, submission of an annual report, informing CAHIIM of adverse changes within the program and paying CAHIIM administrative fees. HIM students may opt to participate in a full-time bridge program called the Joint Bachelor of Science/Masters Program. With this program, students can achieve both the Bachelor of Science in Health Information Management and the Master of Health Services Administration Program (BSHIM/MHSA). The full-time bridge program allows students to achieve both degrees in five years. Students pursuing the BSHIM/MHSA will be prepared to assume management and executive positions in health-related organizations such as: hospitals, managed care organizations, health information system developers and vendors, and pharmaceutical companies, and bring their knowledge in HIM to these positions.

In Canada, graduates of Canadian College of Health Information Management (CCHIM) programs are eligible to write a national certification examination to pursue a profession in HIM.

==== Online program availability ====
There are many programs that are also available online. Online students collaborate with in-class students using internet technology. With online learning, students are allowed to go through the programs at their own pace. Online students are included in class through group lectures that are recorded and put online, discussion boards, and are members of group projects with in-class students. Some online students are even allowed to attend some classes on campus and take some classes online.

The CAHIIM lists accredited online programs on its website.

==== Further education ====
In addition to gaining initial credentials, health information professionals may elect to pursue a Master of Health Information Management, Master of Business Administration, Master of Health Administration, or other master's programs in health data management, information technology and systems, and organization and management. Gaining further education advances the health professional's career and qualifies the individual for upper-management positions.

== Impact ==
=== Efficiency ===
The implementation of health information technology has impacted the efficiency of health care protocols. Vast improvement has been seen across administrative processes, clinical practices, and patient outcomes. Computerized systems allow for a higher level of organization of patient records and information. Clinicians can more easily access patient information in order to treat, diagnose, and administer necessary treatment. Readily available medical records are crucial for supporting patient needs along every step of the health care process. An efficient health information system can help to reduce medical error by introducing regulating clinical guidelines across health care providers.

=== Patient Satisfaction ===
Healthcare information management makes patient care of central importance: a review of research found that those who improved their electronic systems have reported it to be beneficial for patients. As technology has shifted to a digitalized era, physicians may spend more time with patients. Health providers can efficiently treat, prescribe medicine, and make preventive care a priority. Since the administrative side of medicine has been made more reliable, health care providers may shift to their focus more solely to patients. Overall, HIM allows for more attention to detail, maximized patient-doctor time, and quality of care.

=== Administrative processes ===
The increased use of automation in hospital and health systems has improved the efficiency of administration. Hospitals that have largely shifted to technological management have seen optimization of wait time, resource allocation, and cost effectiveness. Patients benefit from these improvements as they can prioritize their health and relationship to their provider. There has been great productivity in billing, since payment plans are made clear via use of automation. The integration of health care technology has reduced the errors commonly seen in health records and patient communication. As scheduling appointments are made easier, patients experience can less trouble concerning appointments. By standardizing hospitals' information systems, there is a reduction in costs usually pertaining to staffing and operations.

== Elements of HIM ==
Healthcare quality and safety require that accurate information be available at the right time to support patient care and health system management decisions. Gaining consensus on essential data content and documentation standards is a necessary prerequisite for high-quality data in an interconnected healthcare system. Continuous, quality management of data standards and content is key to ensuring that information is usable and actionable.

=== Records ===
- The patient health record is the primary legal record documenting the health care services provided to a person in any aspect of the health care system. The term includes routine clinical or office records, records of care in any health related setting, preventive care, lifestyle evaluation, research protocols and various clinical databases. This repository of information about a single patient is generated by health care professionals as a direct result of interaction with a patient or with individuals who have personal knowledge of the patient.
- The primary patient record is the record that is used by health care professionals while providing patient care services to review patient data or document their own observations, actions, or instructions.
- The secondary patient record is a record that is derived from the primary record and contains selected data elements to aid non-clinical persons in supporting, evaluating, and advancing patient care. Patient care support refers to administration, regulation, and payment functions.

=== Practices ===
==== Methods for Data Quality ====
The accuracy of data depends on the manual or computer information system design for collecting, recording, storing, processing, accessing, and displaying data, as well as the ability and follow-through of the people involved in each phase of these activities. Everyone involved with documenting or using health information is responsible for its quality. According to AHIMA's Data Quality Management Model, there are four key processes for data:

1. Application: the purpose for which the data are collected.
2. Collection: the processes by which data elements are accumulated.
3. Warehousing: the processes and systems used to store and maintain data and data journals.
4. Analysis: the process of translating data into information utilized for an application.

Each aspect is analyzed with 10 different data characteristics:

1. Accuracy: Data are the correct values and are valid.
2. Accessibility: Data items should be easily obtainable and legal to collect.
3. Comprehensiveness: All required data items are included. Ensure that the entire scope of the data is collected and document intentional limitations.
4. Consistency: The value of the data should be reliable and the same across applications.
5. Currency: The data should be up to date. A datum value is up to date if it is current for a specific point in time. It is outdate if it was current at some preceding time yet incorrect at a later time.
6. Definition: Clear definitions should be provided so that current and future data users will know what the data mean. Each data element should have clear meaning and acceptable values.
7. Granularity: The attributes and values of data should be defined at the correct level of detail.
8. Precision: Data values should be just large enough to support the application or process.
9. Relevancy: The data are meaningful to the performance of the process or application for which they are collected.
10. Timeliness: Timeliness is determined by how the data are being used and their context.

== Health information professionals ==
Health information management is a growing field for health care professionals, offering opportunities in traditional and non-traditional settings for an HIM professional to work within.

- Traditional settings include: managing an HIM medical records department, cancer registry, coding, trauma registry, transcription, quality improvement, release of information, patient admissions, compliance auditor, physician accreditation, utilization review, physician offices, and risk management.
- Non-traditional settings include: consulting firms, government agencies, law firms, insurance companies, correctional facilities, extended care facilities, pharmaceutical research, information technology, and medical software companies.

=== Health information managers ===
Professional health information managers manage and construct health information programs to guarantee that they accommodate medical, legal, and ethical standards. They play a crucial role in the maintenance, collection, and analysis of data that is received by doctors, nurses, and other healthcare professionals: these healthcare data contributors also rely on the information to deliver quality healthcare. Managers must work with a group of information technicians to guarantee that the patient's medical records are accurate and available when needed.

In the United States, health information managers are typically certified as a Registered Health Information Administrator (RHIA) after achieving a bachelor's degree in health informatics or health information management from a school accredited by CAHIIM and after passing their respective certification exam. The Certified Health Informatics Systems Professional (CHISP) certification offered by the American Society of Health Informatics Managers (ASHIM) is to credit a working level IT or clinical professional who is able to support physician adoption of Health IT. A CHISP professional needs to process knowledge of the health care environment, Health IT, IT, and soft skills including communication skills.

RHIAs usually assume a managerial position that interacts with all levels of an organization that uses patient data in decision making and everyday operations. They may work in a broad range of settings that span the continuum of healthcare, including office-based physician practices, nursing homes, home health agencies, mental health facilities, and public health agencies.

Health information managers may specialize in registry management, data management, and data quality, among other areas.

=== Medical records and Health information technicians ===
Medical records (MR) and Health information technicians (HIT) are described as having the following duties according to the U.S. Bureau of Labor Statistics' Occupational Outlook Handbook:

assemble patients' health information including medical history, symptoms, examination results, diagnostic tests, treatment methods, and all other healthcare provider services. Technicians organize and manage health information data by ensuring its quality, accuracy, accessibility, and security. They regularly communicate with physicians and other healthcare professionals to clarify diagnoses or to obtain additional information.

In the United States, health information technicians are certified as a Registered Health Information Technician (RHIT) after completing an associate degree in health information technology from a school accredited by the Commission on Accreditation for Health Informatics and Information Management Education (CAHIIM) before they may take their certification exam.

=== HIM Job Prospects ===
- Revenue Cycle Management Quality Auditor
- Medical Claim Specialist
- Revenue Cycle Management Manager
- Enrolment Specialist
- Clinical Documentation Specialist
- Medical Records Summarizer
- Insurance Claim Processor
- Medical Claim Review Analyst
- Insurance Coordinator
- Healthcare Functional Analyst
- Denial Management Specialist
- Clinical Chart Reviewer
- Revenue Cycle Analyst
- Medical Data Reviewer

The International Labour Organization's International Standard Classification of Occupations also notes that, occupations similar to Medical Records and Health Information Technicians:

"...normally require knowledge of medical terminology, legal aspects of health information, health data standards and computer- or paper-based data management as obtained through formal education and/or on-the-job-training."

MRHITs usually work in hospitals; however, they may also work in a variety of other healthcare settings including office-based physician practices, nursing homes, home health agencies, mental health facilities, and public health agencies. Technicians who specialize in coding are called medical coders or coding specialists.

=== Training and Certification In India ===
In India, educational institutions focus on job-oriented courses in the healthcare sector, offering degree and diploma courses in health information management. The curriculum that is normally followed is framed according to global standards. The HIM course can be considered as being accepted worldwide. Universities in India that offer skill-based certifications have started issuing UGC-approved Health Information Management degrees. BVoc Health Information Management is a graduation that offers a variety of job prospects. The courses are designed according to the National Skills Qualification Framework (NSQF) to pursue a comprehensive curriculum and equip aspirants to pursue a career in the HIM sector.

== See also ==
- Clinical documentation improvement
- Hospital information systems
- Human resources for health (HRH) information systems
- Medical classifications
- SNOMED CT
