= American Health Information Management Association =

American medical association

- Abbreviation: AHIMA
- Formation: 1928
- Type: Professional Association
- Headquarters: Chicago, Illinois, U.S.
- Region served: Worldwide
- Services: Health Information and Informatics Certifications, Education & Training, Conferences
- Members: Over 103,000 Members and Credential Holders (2017)
- Official language: English
- CEO: Wylecia Wiggs Harris, PhD, CAE
- Affiliations: 52 Component State Associations

The American Health Information Management Association (AHIMA) is a professional association for health professionals involved in the health information management needed to deliver quality health care to the public. Traditionally focused mainly on hospitals and paper medical records, the field presently covers all health information technology systems, including electronic health records, clinical decision support systems, and so on, for all segments of health care.

As of 2013, the association has more than 71,000 members in four membership classifications. Each member subsequently belongs to a relevant state chapter. The Journal of AHIMA has a circulation of 61,000 and publishes both peer-reviewed and non–peer-reviewed articles. The association's women-majority membership is a testament to women's strong participation in the profession.

AHIMA describes its foundation as a sister organization to the Association for Healthcare Documentation Integrity (AHDI) and states the foundation has a charitable and educational nature. The foundation formulates and issues opinions, supports education, conducts research and compiles its contributions into the AHIMA BoK (body of knowledge).

== History ==
The organization traces its history back to 1928 when the American College of Surgeons established the Association of Record Librarians of North America (ARLNA) to "elevate the standards of clinical records in hospitals and other medical institutions." The organization has had three name changes in its history, all were justified with an explanation that reflected the progression of contemporary medical record use, practices and perceptions. In 1938 the association became the American Association of Medical Record Librarians (AAMRL).

In 1970, the association became the American Medical Record Association (AMRA) and in 1991, the title American Health Information Management Association (AHIMA) was adopted. Incorporation occurred in 1943 and became effective the next year.

== Credentials ==
The association offers seven credentials pertaining to four areas of practice:

- Health Information Management (RHIA, RHIT)
- Coding (CCA, CCS, CCS-P)
- Data Analysis (CHDA)
- Privacy (CHPS)

Two credentials require formal education, the others are acquired by a combination of testing and work experience. AHIMA requires members obtain regular continuing education to maintain their credentials.

== See also ==
- California Health Information Association
- Commission on Accreditation for Health Informatics and Information Management Education
- Health information management
