= ACC (programming language) =

Programming language

ACC is a near-C compiler for the MS-DOS operating system on the IBM PC line of computers for programs. The compiler and compiled programs will run on any Intel 80386 or above PC running MS-DOS. Included with the compiler are a 386 assembler and a linker for combining multiple object files. There are also two libraries, which are a protected mode DOS extender (based on Thomas Pytel's, AKA Tran's PMODE30B + PMODE307 DOS extenders), and a library of functions callable by C programs.

Pointers are 4 bytes, and can access all available memory. All memory can be allocated too. The compiler, assembler and linker are all very small and reportedly very fast.

ACC uses simple commands which place objects and change them. As such, it is very hard to make games with complicated sprites, because there is no command which can group objects. Almost every type of command is two or three letters, for example: tx=text, col=color, oct=octagon, etc. It is similar to Batch.
