= National Clinical Coding Qualification (UK) =

- Acronym: NCCQ
- Administrator: Institute of Health Records and Information Management (IHRIM)
- Skills tested: Clinical coding ability and knowledge
- Purpose: Professional development
- Year started: 1999
- Duration: Three hours per paper
- Offered: Twice a year
- Regions: United Kingdom
- Languages: British English
- Prerequisites: Hold a valid IHRIM membership at the time of registration and taking the exam
- Qualification rate: Not published
- Pass mark: Practical = 90% Theory = 70%
- Website: www.ihrim.co.uk

The National Clinical Coding Qualification (UK) (NCCQ) is a professional examination for clinical coders working in the United Kingdom.

Currently, it is the only clinical coding qualification recognised by the NHS. Having the NCCQ is a requirement of being admitted to the National Clinical Coding Trainer and Auditor Programmes run by NHS Digital. In order for an acute trust to obtain level 2 of the Information Governance Toolkit (IGT) requirement 510, they are expected to support coding staff in attaining the NCCQ.

Upon passing the examination a clinical coder is awarded the designation Accredited Clinical Coder (ACC).

== Development ==
In 1998 the Chief Executive of the former NHS Centre for Coding and Classifications (NHS CCC) initiated work to establish a national clinical coding qualification appropriate for the NHS. The NHS CCC developed a prototype assessment with results reported at the end of February 1998. On 10 March 1998, the NHS CCC hosted a workshop with educational organisations and other stakeholders to define the objectives of a qualification, scope of the syllabus, the quality assurance standards and validation processes. The results of the prototype assessment were also presented. The findings from the pilot formed the basis for the development of a national qualification.

Following meetings between the NHS CCC and the Institute of Health Records and Information Management (IHRIM) early in 1998, it was agreed the NHS CCC and IHRIM would work together to establish a National Clinical Coding Qualification for the UK. The original objectives of this work were to:

- Provide recognition of the clinical coding profession
- Support the recruitment and on-going assessment of clinical coding staff
- Give organisations confidence in the quality of coding
- Provide a recognised benchmark for the required standard of clinical coding

The first NCCQ examination was held in May 1999, and has continued to date with examinations held twice a year, typically in March and September.

=== Purpose ===
The National Clinical Coding Qualification (UK) was designed to support the need for good quality clinical information, as outlined in the Information for Health and the NHS Plan.

The NCCQ (UK) is designed for clinical coders working in the NHS, to support the production of high quality coded clinical data, to recognise competence, and value the skills and knowledge of clinical coders.

== Exam ==
The NCCQ (UK) examination consists of two written papers that are both taken over the course of one day. The level of attainment for each paper is

=== Paper 1 – Practical coding ===
In the morning there is a three-hour practical paper, which is split into three sections:

- ICD-10 quick-fire
- OPCS-4 quick-fire
- Case studies

The coder is allowed bring their copy of the ICD-10 & OPCS-4 Tabular Lists and Alphabetical Index for this paper. These may be annotated with information from the National Clinical Coding Standards Reference Books and Coding Clinic. In addition, a copy of the British National Formulary (BNF) may be brought in. Medical dictionaries are not allowed.

The passmark for the practical paper is 90%. A distinction is awarded for a score of 95% and over.

=== Paper 2 – Theory ===
In the afternoon the three-hour theory paper test the coder’s knowledge of the theory of ICD-10, OPCS-4, SNOMED CT, data quality, coding audit, medical terminology, and anatomy and physiology. Coders are not allowed to bring any additional materials into this exam.

In May 2022 IHRIM announced higher pass marks effective from 1st April 2022 and to be formally introduced in the September 2022 NCCQ (UK) examinations. The new passmark for the theory paper is now 70% (previously 60%) with a distinction awarded for a score of 85% and over (previously 80%).

=== Resitting ===
Resits are possible. The coder is able to retake individual papers but must pass within the next 3 examinations or they will have to retake both papers again.

== Requirements ==
Because clinical coding training varies across the countries of the UK, there is no minimum competency for sitting the NCCQ. However; IHRIM recommend that a candidate has completed a clinical coding foundation course, has at least 2 years experience as a coder, and undergone a coding refresher course or NCCQ revision workshop before sitting the exam.

The coder must be a member of IHRIM at the time of registering for and taking the NCCQ. Membership is charged in addition to the exam fees. Though, once the coder has passed, there is no requirement to remain an IHRIM member to be able use the ACC post-nominal letters.
