= Medically Unlikely Edit =

A Medically Unlikely Edit (MUE) is a US Medicare unit of service claim edit applied to Medical claims against a procedure code for medical services rendered by one provider/supplier to one patient on one day. Claim edits compare different values on medical claim to a set of defined criteria to check for irregularities, often in an automated claims processing system. MUE are designed to limit fraud and/or coding errors. They represent an upper limit that unquestionably requires further documentation to support. The ideal MUE is the maximum unit of service for a code on the majority of medical claims. MUE is part of the National Correct Coding Initiative (NCCI) to address coding methodologies. The NCCI policies are based on coding conventions by nationally recognized organizations and are updated annually or quarterly.

== History ==
Medically Unlikely Edits began in January 2007 they are generally based on biological considerations, like number of limbs or organs. They adjudicate on units billed per line of service. The same code billed on different lines for the same date of service are subject to duplicate adjudication edits where CPT Modifiers like 59, 76 and 77 may impact the payment. The edits were not publicly released until 2009, with some of them remaining confidential out of concern for abuse . MUE are not intended to be utilization guidelines. Units less than listed may be inappropriate.

It is difficult to establish to what extent private payers are using NCCI edits. Other than published CMS edits, there are no nationally recognized code edits, although there have been proposals to create some. A 2005 study found that private payers were applying "CPT codes, guidelines and conventions", "CMS payment rules", "National Correct Coding Initiative", and "Payer-specific proprietary edits" to claim, of these about 25% were "Payer-specific proprietary edits"
