= Commission on Accreditation for Health Informatics and Information Management Education =

The Commission on Accreditation for Health Informatics and Information Management Education (CAHIIM) is an accrediting organization for degree-granting programs in health informatics and health information management. Its Board of Commissions is made up of 12 volunteers, 8 of which are elected by the general membership of CAHIIM's sponsor, American Health Information Management Association (AHIMA). CAHIIM is recognized by CHEA as an organization that accredits associate and baccalaureate degree programs in health information management and master's degree programs in health informatics and health information management professions in the United States and Puerto Rico.
