= Superbill =

US medical billing form

A superbill is an itemized form, used by healthcare providers in the United States, which details services provided to a patient. It is the main data source for creation of a healthcare claim, which will be submitted to payers (insurances, funds, programs) for reimbursement.

There is no standard format for a superbill but it usually covers certain key information about the provider, the patient, and the type of care.

Patients who see a provider outside their insurance network, or one who does not bill insurance, may pay at the time of service and then submit a superbill to their insurer to request partial reimbursement. A superbill used this way typically lists the provider's credentials, National Provider Identifier and license number, the dates of service, ICD diagnosis codes, CPT procedure codes, and the amounts charged and paid. Reimbursement is not guaranteed and depends on the plan's out-of-network benefits, deductible and allowed amount.

== See also ==
- Medical billing
- Health insurance in the United States
