= Accumulator =

Accumulator may refer to:

- Accumulator (bet), a parlay bet
- Accumulator (computing), in a CPU, a processor register for storing intermediate results
- Accumulator (computer vision), discrete cell structure to count votes, standard component of the Hough transform
- Accumulator (cryptography), a value, determined by a set of values, that allows one to verify if any one of the original values is a member of the set
- Accumulator (energy), an apparatus for storing energy or power
  - Capacitor, in electrical engineering, also known by the obsolete term accumulator
  - Electrochemical cell, a cell that stores electrical energy, typically used in rechargeable batteries
  - Hydraulic accumulator, an energy storage device using hydraulic fluid under pressure
  - Thermal accumulator, a device or system that provides thermal energy storage as from concentrated solar power and storage heaters or heat banks in buildings
- Accumulator (structured product), a financial contract used by clients (usually individuals) to accumulate stock positions over time
- Accumulator, a 2022 track by Leftfield from This Is What We Do
- Accumulator 1, a Czech film
- Dynamic accumulator, a plant that mines nutrients from the soil through its roots
