= List of colleges and universities in Maine =

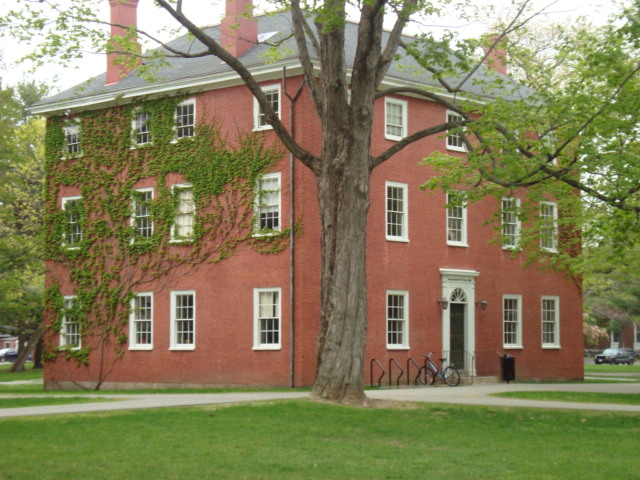
Bowdoin College's Massachusetts Hall

The U.S. state of Maine has twenty-nine accredited, degree-granting institutions of higher learning. The state's land-grant university and only research university is the University of Maine in Orono. It is the flagship of the University of Maine System, which also has institutions in Augusta, Portland/Gorham/Lewiston, Farmington, Fort Kent, Machias, and Presque Isle. Maine's public education system also includes the Maine Community College System, comprising seven schools, and the Maine Maritime Academy.

The state's three oldest institutions of higher education are Bowdoin College (founded in 1794), Colby College (1813), and Bates College (1855). The three colleges collectively form the Colby-Bates-Bowdoin Consortium and are often ranked in the top 10 percent of all liberal arts colleges.

The largest institution in the state is the public University of Maine, with 12,231 students. The smallest, with 43 students, is Maine Media College. The University of Maine is home to the state's only NCAA Division I athletic program, the Maine Black Bears. Maine also hosts numerous private baccalaureate colleges such as Husson University, Unity Environmental University, and Thomas College. There is only one medical school in the state, the University of New England's College of Osteopathic Medicine, and only one law school, the University of Maine School of Law.

== Open institutions ==
Universities and colleges in Maine blue=public; green=private

School	Location(s)	Control	Type (Note: School types are based on the Carnegie Classification of Institutions of Higher Education.)	Enrollment (Fall 2024)	Founded	Athletic Conference
University of Maine	Orono, Portland, and Machias	Public	Research university	12,029	1865	AmEast (NCAA D-I)
Unity Environmental University	New Gloucester and Unity	Private	Masters university	7,165	1965	N/A
Southern Maine Community College	South Portland and Brunswick	Public	Associates college	7,900	1946	YSCC (USCAA D-II)
University of New England	Biddeford and Portland	Private	Research university	6,573	1939	CNE (NCAA D-III)
University of Southern Maine	Gorham and Portland	Public	Masters university	7,604	1878	LEC (NCAA D-III)
Central Maine Community College	Auburn	Public	Associates college	4,754	1963	YSCC (USCAA D-II)
Husson University	Bangor	Private	Doctoral university	3,367	1898	CNE (NCAA D-III)
University of Maine at Augusta	Augusta	Public	Baccalaureate college	4,412	1965	YSCC (USCAA D-II)
Eastern Maine Community College	Bangor	Public	Associates college	2,719	1966	N/A
Kennebec Valley Community College	Fairfield	Public	Associates college	2,489	1969	Independent (USCAA D-II)
Colby College	Waterville	Private	Baccalaureate college	2,412	1813	NESCAC (NCAA D-III)
York County Community College	Wells	Public	Associates college	1,875	1994	YSCC (USCAA D-II)
Bowdoin College	Brunswick	Private	Baccalaureate college	1,881	1794	NESCAC (NCAA D-III)
Bates College	Lewiston	Private	Baccalaureate college	1,760	1855	NESCAC (NCAA D-III)
Thomas College	Waterville	Private	Masters university	1,635	1894	NAC (NCAA D-III)
University of Maine at Farmington	Farmington	Public	Baccalaureate college	2,100	1863	NAC (NCAA D-III)
University of Maine at Presque Isle	Presque Isle	Public	Baccalaureate college	2,873	1903	NAC (NCAA D-III)
Saint Joseph's College of Maine	Standish	Private	Masters university	1,454	1912	GNAC (NCAA D-III)
Maine Maritime Academy	Castine	Public	Baccalaureate college	971	1941	CNE (NCAA D-III)
Northern Maine Community College	Presque Isle	Public	Associates college	843	1961	N/A
Washington County Community College	Calais	Public	Associates college	805	1969	Independent (USCAA D-II)
University of Maine at Fort Kent	Fort Kent	Public	Baccalaureate college	1,562	1878	Independent (USCAA D-II)
Maine College of Art & Design	Portland	Private	Special-focus institution	475	1882	N/A
Beal University	Bangor	Private (for-profit)	Associates college	504	1891	N/A
College of the Atlantic	Bar Harbor	Private	Baccalaureate college	358	1969	N/A
Maine College of Health Professions	Lewiston	Private	Special-focus institution	239	1891	N/A
Institute for Doctoral Studies in the Visual Arts	Portland	Private	Masters college	99	2007	N/A
Maine Media College	Rockport	Private	Special-focus institution	42	1973	N/A

== Defunct institutions ==
School	Location(s)	Founded	Closed	Cite
Bangor Theological Seminary	Bangor	1814	2013	
Bliss College	Lewiston	1897	1972	
Casco Bay College	Portland	1863	1999	(Note: Casco Bay College was purchased by Andover College in 1999.)
Eastern State Normal School	Castine	1867	1942	
Gorham State College	Gorham	1878	1970	
Immaculate Heart of Mary Institute	Saco			
John F. Kennedy College	Fort Kent	1965	1975	
LaMennais College	Alfred	1951	1959	
Mid-State College	Augusta	1867	2003	
Nasson College	Springvale	1912	1983	
Northern Conservatory of Music	Bangor	1929	1972	
Oblate College & Seminary	Bar Harbor	1941	1969	
Ricker College	Houlton	1848	1978	
Salt Institute for Documentary Studies	Portland	1973	2016	Acquired by the Maine College of Art
Westbrook College	Portland	1831	1996	(Note: The Westbrook College campus is now known by the University of New England as the UNE Portland Campus.)
The Landing School	Arundel	1976	2026	

== Out-of-state institutions ==
- Northeastern University in Massachusetts offers graduate degrees in technology at the Roux Institute in Portland.
- Tufts University School of Medicine in Massachusetts offers a medical degree program at the Maine Medical Center in Portland.

== Unaccredited institutions ==
Two schools are recognized by the state as a degree-granting institution, but have not been accredited by a recognized accrediting body:

- Heartwood College of Art — Biddeford
- New England Bible College and Seminary - Augusta, Maine

== See also ==
- List of college athletic programs in Maine
- Higher education in the United States
- Lists of American institutions of higher education
- Education in Maine
