= COVID-19 pandemic in Maine =

- Disease: COVID-19
- Pathogen: SARS-CoV-2
- Location: Maine, U.S.
- Index case: Androscoggin County
- Confirmed cases: 370,883 (through January 3, 2026)
- Hospitalized cases: 10,931 (cumulative through January 3, 2026)
- Deaths: 3,672 (through January 3, 2026)

Government website
- coronavirus.maine.gov

The COVID-19 pandemic was publicly reported to have reached the U.S. state of Maine on March 12, 2020. As of February 2, 2021, the Maine Department of Health and Human Services reported 131,530 confirmed cases and 46,971 probable cases in the state, with 1,777 deaths attributed to the virus.

As of February 2, 2021, it was reported that Maine has administered 2,492,316 COVID-19 vaccine doses, and has fully vaccinated 977,759 people, equivalent to 76.35% of the population.

== Timeline ==
On March 12, Maine announced the state's first confirmed case of the coronavirus, a Navy reservist in her 50s from Androscoggin County who had returned from duty in Italy. On March 27, 2020, Maine reported its first death due to coronavirus, which was a man in his 80s from Cumberland County. On April 29, 8 employees working at a local Tyson Foods meat packaging plant in Portland, Maine tested positive for COVID-19 prompting talks about halting the plant's production. On the same day, 20 cases were confirmed at the Penobscot Hope House Health and Living Center in Bangor, Maine which houses a homeless shelter.

The Maine Center for Disease Control and Prevention reported that the state's second-largest outbreak occurred after a wedding reception on August 7, 2020. Sixty-five people attended a reception in Millinocket at a hall that had capacity for 50 people. About half the 53 cases were found in wedding guests, and one woman, who was not a guest, died on August 22. It is unclear if guests wore masks. By September 5, the outbreak had infected 177 people and caused seven deaths, including 80 cases at a prison 230 mi (370 km) away. A lawyer for the officiant at the wedding said the Calvary Baptist Church in Sanford was encouraging its congregants to not wear masks, and the church's school, Sanford Christian Academy, does not require face coverings.

On October 22, 2020, 46 COVID-19 cases were linked to a fellowship rally between October 2 and October 4 at the Brooks Pentecostal Church.

After his death on December 11, 2021, at 62, the Sun Journal reported 2020 U.S. Senate candidate Max Linn may have been the first person in Maine with COVID-19 after he returned from a business trip to Wuhan, China in late December 2019.

== Government response ==
=== March, 2020 ===
On March 2, 2020, Governor Janet Mills convened a coronavirus response team, led by Nirav Shah, director of the Maine Center for Disease Control and Prevention, to coordinate state efforts against the virus. The Maine Center for Disease Control and Prevention began its response efforts in December 2019 when the virus was first reported in Wuhan, China.

After the first case was reported on March 12, 2020, Governor Janet Mills declared a health insurance emergency to insure private insurance coverage of coronavirus testing, recommended postponing gatherings of more than 250 people for at least 30 days, and suspended all non-essential out-of-state travel by state employees for 30 days.

On March 15, 2020, Governor Janet Mills declared a civil state of emergency which allows the governor to establish emergency reserves of products, allows the state to access federal funding to combat the outbreak, and allows for suspension of certain laws. Governor Mills recommended halting classroom instruction in Maine and stopping all gatherings of more than 50 people, or more than 10 people if senior citizens were involved in the gathering. She also recommended postponing non-urgent medical procedures, doctors appointments, and elective surgeries, and restricting visitors to long-term healthcare facilities.

On March 16, 2020, Maine was one of the first states to have its application for the United States Small Business Administration Economic Injury Disaster Loan approved, which would help businesses in Maine recover financial losses due to coronavirus closures. On March 16, Governor Mills also called for all Saint Patrick's Day events to be cancelled throughout the state. The Maine Legislature also enacted a supplemental budget of $73 million which focused on coronavirus response, including $1 million to the Maine Center for Disease Control and Prevention, $15 million to increase MaineCare reimbursement rates for health care providers, and $38 million to K-12 education to help in the wake of school closures.

On March 17, 2020, Governor Mills issued a Declaration of Abnormal Market Disruption, which prohibits specific essential items from being sold at unconscionable prices, including paper products, cleaning supplies, personal hygiene products, and medical supplies. Governor Mills also announced an emergency measures package which was approved by the legislature to provide $11 million in state funding for COVID-19 response, expand State and local authorities to allow greater flexibility in virus response, and to provide additional support to impacted workers.

On March 18, 2020, Governor Mills issued an executive order which mandated all bars and restaurants close to dine-in customers, but allowed take-out, delivery, and drive-through to continue. All gatherings of 10 or more people were prohibited, and non-essential businesses such as gyms, hair-salons, casinos, and malls were urged to close to minimize gatherings in public.

On March 19, 2020, Governor Mills wrote a letter to Vice President Mike Pence and the U.S. Secretary of Health and Human Services Alex Azar to request for more personal protective equipment be released to the state of Maine from the Strategic National Stockpile. She also convened a conference call with Senator Susan Collins, Senator Angus King, Representative Chellie Pingree, and Representative Jared Golden to discuss the State response to the pandemic. Additionally, Governor Mills signed an executive order to require school districts to continue paying hourly employees for the duration of the school year.

On March 19, the City of Bangor announced that the Community Connector bus service would begin only allowing people to enter from the rear of the bus to encourage social distancing beginning on March 20. Passengers using walkers and wheelchairs were allowed to board from the front of the bus. As more social distancing practices were put into effect, the City of Bangor began using an honor system for the bus service and asked that passengers not occupy the seats directly behind the driver.

On March 20, 2020, Governor Mills opened waters to inland fishing and suspended license requirements until April 30 to encourage individuals to go outside during the pandemic. She wrote a letter to President Donald Trump to request financial assistance, subsidies, operating loans, or other measures to support the seafood industry, fishermen, and aquaculture. She also issued an executive order which would allow licensed physicians, physician assistants, and nurses who were licensed in another state to be issued an emergency Maine license valid through the declared state of emergency.

On March 23, 2020, Governor Mills passed an executive order that extended expiration dates and waived fees for driver's licenses and other related motor vehicle licenses until 30 days past the state of emergency.

On March 24, 2020, Governor Mills ordered all non-essential businesses to close their physical locations and cease in-person contact and urged all essential businesses to limit the number of individuals in stores at any given time.

On March 24, the City of Portland announced that the manager has signed a stay-at-home order beginning on March 25 for all non-essential businesses and services in Portland, with a potential end date on April 27. On March 26, the City of South Portland also announced a similar order beginning March 27 except for permitted activities.

On March 25, 2020, Governor Mills signed an executive order which enhanced the health care workforce and telehealth efforts by allowing physicians, physicians assistants, and nurses to obtain relevant licenses to deliver health services remotely and have those remote services be covered by insurance companies.

On March 26, 2020, Governor Mills extended the deadline for state income tax payments from April 15, 2020, to July 15, 2020. Additionally, ten state parks were closed by the Department of Agriculture, Conservation, and Forestry's Bureau of Parks and Lands on March 26, including Reid State Park, Popham Beach State Park, Fort Popham, Fort Baldwin, Kettle Cove State Park, Two Lights State Park, Crescent Beach State Park, Scarborough Beach State Park, Ferry Beach State Park, and Mackworth Island. Nursing homes were also now able to request funds to help respond to the pandemic within their facilities.

On March 30, Maine Governor Janet Mills issued "a Stay Healthy at Home directive that requires people living in Maine to stay at home at all times unless for an essential job or an essential personal reason, such as obtaining food, medicine, health care, or other necessary purposes."

=== April, 2020 ===
On April 3, Governor Mills enacted an executive order which mandated travelers arriving in Maine to self-quarantine for 14 days. Under this order, travelers were required to quarantine upon arrival regardless of their state of residency. This order also suspended hotels, motels, bed and breakfasts, short-term rentals, RV parks, campgrounds, and all public and private camping facilities. Violations of the order could be subject to a penalty of six months in jail or a $1,000 fine.

On April 4, Governor Mills announced that her request for a major disaster declaration was approved by President Donald Trump. This declaration allows for state agencies and municipalities in Maine to be reimbursed for 75% of approved costs related to pandemic response.

On April 7, Governor Mills issued an executive order that expanded healthcare access to Maine residents. This order allowed all health care providers that were licensed under the Office of Professional and Occupational Regulation, including social workers and physical therapists, to provide services via telemedicine. This order also extended license expiration and renewal dates.

On April 10, Gov. Mills rescheduled Maine's congressional and legislative primary elections from June 9, 2020, to July 14. Mills' executive order also expanded the ability to request absentee ballots, which may now be done up to and on election day.

On April 15, Gov. Mills extended Maine's state of civil emergency through May 15, 2020.

On April 16, Gov. Mills signed an executive order which prevented the immediate eviction of residents during the state of emergency, and also announced a partnership with MaineHousing to provide rental assistance. The rent relief program began with $5 million and allowed households to receive a one-time, up to $500 payment in assistance to their landlord.

On April 21, Gov. Mills's administration began a new volunteer phone support service for health care workers and first responders called the FrontLine WarmLine. This service is a collaborative effort between the Maine Department of Health and Human Services, the Maine Department of Public Safety's Emergency Medical Services, the Maine Association of Psychiatric Physicians, The Opportunity Alliance, The Maine Psychological Association, and the Maine Chapter of the National Association of Social Workers. This service provides assistance to all who are responding to the pandemic in Maine and helps responders manage stress associated with their jobs. Volunteer professionals who answer the support line include licensed psychiatrists, therapists, social workers, and nurse practitioners.

On April 22, Gov. Mills and the Maine Department of Health and Human Services Commissioner Jeanne Lambrew announced that approximately $11 million would support child care access for essential workers and offer relief for child care providers. This money was granted under the CARES Act.

On April 28, Gov. Mills announced a plan to gradually restart Maine's economy. The plan had four stages, with stage one slated to begin on May 1. Later stages discussed revisiting limitations on gatherings, stay-at-home orders, and reservations and capacity limits for restaurants, gyms, retail stores, and campgrounds.

On April 29, Gov. Mills issued a Stay Safer at Home Executive Order, which was set to be in effect until May 31, 2020. This order allowed Maine residents to visit businesses and participate in activities that were safe under Stage 1 of the governor's reopening plan, including drive-in theaters, hair salons, golf courses, and car washes. Residents were advised to continue remote work if able, were prohibited to gather in groups of more than 10 people, and were subject to 14 day quarantines upon entry into the state. The order also required residents of Maine to wear cloth face coverings in public places where physical distancing could not be achieved, such as within retail stores and taking public transportation.

The Maine Department of Agriculture, Conservation, and Forestry closed 10 coastal state parks as overcrowding at those parks made social distancing difficult. The department said it would monitor the remaining state parks, most of which were still closed for the winter though walk-ins are permitted. Baxter State Park, a park independent of the state park system, announced it would close until at least July 1, only permitting walk-in day hikes. Acadia National Park announced it would close indefinitely to prevent first responders from being exposed to the virus in the event of an injury and to prevent travel by visitors to the area.

=== May, 2020 ===
On May 6, 2020, Gov. Mills announced that she would create an Economic Recovery Committee to develop recommendations to help address the impact of the COVID-19 pandemic on Maine's economy. The committee consists of thirty-seven members, and is co-chaired by Laurie Lachance, President of Thomas College and former Maine State Economist, and Josh Broder, the CEO of Tilson. Other committee members are individuals representing small businesses, non-profit organizations, unions, educational institutions, and legislators.

As part of Stage 1 of the Restarting Maine's Economy Plan, Maine government allows for golf courses, barber shops, hair salons, dog groomers, car washes, and auto dealerships to reopen with strict social distancing and mask-wearing guidelines as of May 1, 2020.

=== June, 2020 ===
As part of Stage 2 of the Restarting Maine's Economy plan, Gov. Mills allows large social gatherings and religious gatherings consistent with the state's size limitations with added health and safety precautions.

The city of Biddeford gives an emergency ordinance, which allows retailers and restaurants to use public space with a temporary "special event permit".

On June 11, 2020, Gov. Mills extended the COVID-19 civil state of emergency through July 10, 2020.

=== July, 2020 ===
Gov. Mills on July 8, issued an Executive Order requiring large businesses, including retail establishments in Maine to enforce the State's face covering requirement.

=== May, 2021 ===
On May 15, 2021, Gov. Mills extended the COVID-19 civil state of emergency through June 13, 2021.

=== June, 2021 ===
On June 11, 2021, Mills announced the end of the state of emergency originally started on March 15, 2020, due to the COVID-19 pandemic. The state of emergency ended June 30, 2021.

=== November, 2021 ===
On November 10, 2021, The Maine Department of Health and Human Services announced it would be receiving 6.5 million in funding from the Center for Disease Control and Prevention's Epidemiology and Laboratory Capacity for Prevention and Control of Emerging Infectious Diseases program to combat COVID-19.

== Impact on colleges and universities ==
On March 25, 2020, Governor Janet Mills signed an agreement through the Maine Emergency Management Agency with the University of Maine System and the Maine Community College System to coordinate assistance requests and ensure the deployment of resources to aid in the government response to COVID-19. Maine colleges and universities received $41 million in federal aid as part of the Coronavirus Aid, Relief, and Economic Security (CARES) Act, with $17.2 million going to the University of Maine System's seven campuses and $8.7 million going to the Maine Community College System. Half of the federal aid money received will go directly to supporting students.

=== Public universities ===
The Maine public university system includes the University of Maine campus in Orono, The University of Maine at Augusta, The University of Maine at Farmington, The University of Maine at Fort Kent, the University of Maine at Presque Isle, the University of Maine at Machias, the University of Southern Maine, and the University of Maine School of Law. The University of Maine system announced that all courses would be administered via remote learning starting March 25, 2020, with the Law School resuming classes on March 23, 2020. The 90% of students who vacated their residence halls were eligible for tuition rebates on a case-by-case basis. Commencement ceremonies across the university system originally scheduled for May 9, 2020 were postponed, and each individual university will designate a postponement date.

The University of Maine system created the Maine Welcome program to offer in-state tuition to students at other colleges and universities who may have had their studies disrupted by closures of academic institutions due to COVID-19. 98.5% of students who were enrolled in University of Maine system campuses at the start of the semester completed their studies despite COVID-19 disruptions. The University of Maine system formed a Fall 2020 Safe Return Planning Committee and will plan to return to in-person instruction by the end of August and will invest $97 million in institutional aid that does not need to be repaid by students or their families. To support hybrid learning models that comply with social distancing requirements, the University of Maine system will spend $2.56 million for classroom IT upgrades.

On March 16, 2020, Maine Maritime Academy announced that it would discontinue on-campus instruction and move to remote instruction. Summer cruises for the TS State of Maine and the Bowdoin ships were postponed, and students registered to complete a cruise in the summer will have to seek alternative opportunities.

=== Private universities ===
Bowdoin College announced on March 11, 2020, that students would not be permitted to return to campus from spring break and that the remainder of the semester would be conducted by remote learning. As of March 25, 2020 four cases of coronavirus were confirmed among the campus community. On March 13, 2020, The University of New England announced that all competitive athletics were canceled for the spring season and that all courses would move online for the spring semester, excluding advanced Dental Hygiene and advanced Nursing student courses. On March 22, 2020, The University of New England announced that an employee had tested positive for COVID-19 and on March 24, 2020, the university announced that it would postpone its commencement ceremonies. The Board of Trustees of the University of New England made the decision to not increase tuition, fees, and room and board costs for the 2020–2021 academic year in light of the pandemic. On May 4, 2020, the University of New England reported that it would reopen its campus in time for the fall semester, and on May 18, 2020, it was announced that virtual graduation events would be held the weekend of June 12–14, 2020. Colby College announced that all on-campus classes would end the week of March 12, 2020 and students would move off campus. All events, performances, and athletic matches were canceled at Colby College beginning on March 15, 2020. On March 19, 2020, a staff member in the Colby College department of athletics was the college's first positive case. On March 26, 2020, there were five total members of the Colby College community, including at least two students, who had tested positive for the virus.

Students of Bates College were asked to leave campus on March 14, 2020, and the college transitioned to remote work models on March 17, 2020. As of March 25, 2020 there were two confirmed COVID-19 cases in Bates College faculty members. Bates College has taken a financial loss of up to $2 million as a result of the COVID-19 pandemic. On March 12, 2020, The College of the Atlantic announced that all instruction for spring 2020 would move to an online format, residence halls would be closed, and all in-person services would be eliminated. Maine College of Art closed all academic buildings to students on March 15, 2020, and announced on March 29, 2020, that the remainder of the spring term would be conducted online. Saint Joseph's College of Maine has transitioned all classroom instruction to online formats and held a virtual commencement ceremony on May 9, 2020. On March 13, 2020, Husson University announced that it would move the majority of classes to online formats, with some exceptions for graduate and professional school courses, and on March 20, 2020, the university announced that it would postpone its commencement ceremonies. On March 15, 2020, in-person instruction was suspended at Thomas College, courses transitioned to online formats, and it was announced that campus residences were closing on March 18, 2020. There have been no COVID-19 cases on the Thomas College campus and the institution plans to resume in-person classes in the fall.

Unity College began remote instruction on March 30, 2020, but has planned an on-campus commencement ceremony for August 1, 2020. The Maine College of Health Professions suspended clinical courses on March 13, 2020. In response to the need for nurses during the pandemic, the Maine College of Health Professions re-opened its application for an associate degree in Nursing program until June 1, 2020, and waived the requirement for HESI exam scores. The Institute for Doctoral Studies in the Visual Arts postponed all summer 2020 residency programs and will offer online instruction during the summer.

=== Community colleges ===
On March 12, 2020, Southern Maine Community College (SMCC) chose to extend its Spring Break and on March 17, 2020, the decision was made to move all courses to an online format, close residence halls, and cancel all gatherings of more than ten people. Students will be allowed to convert letter grades into pass/fail grades at the end of the term. On April 1, 2020, the President of SMCC, Joe Cassidy, made the decision to host a virtual commencement ceremony. SMCC will also hold all summer classes online. Short-term workforce training including an online pharmacy technician training and professional education online licenses in areas such as business, data analysis, finance, and human resources were also made available by SMCC to those impacted by the pandemic.

Eastern Maine Community College (EMCC) announced an extended spring break on March 13, 2020. On March 16, 2020, EMCC dining halls were closed for in-person dining, the number of students allowed to be in common areas such as the library and student center was limited, student housing was closed, and the decision was made to move courses online. Central Maine Community College (CMCC) announced an extension of spring break on March 12, 2020, closing of non-academic services on March 16, 2020, and movement to online courses on March 17, 2020. CMCC announced that all summer classes will be online on April 16, 2020, and informed students of financial assistance available through the Federal CARES Act on May 20, 2020.

On March 12, 2020, Kennebec Valley Community College (KVCC) announced a spring break extension. KVCC updated students on the movement to online course formats on March 18, 2020, and announced on March 31, 2020, that commencement plans would be modified.

York County Community College (YCCC) had moved all classes online as of March 17, 2020 and on May 20, 2020, announced a postponement of their spring 2020 commencement ceremony. On March 15, 2021, they announced the York County '21 Promise, a full tuition scholarship for high school seniors that had taken concurrent courses at the college for students in the class of 2021 affected by the pandemic. On March 26, 2021, they announced a return to in person and on campus learning in the fall semester for some classes.

Northern Maine Community College (NMCC) discontinued face-to-face classroom instruction on March 18, 2020, and also canceled their spring 2020 commencement ceremony. On April 12, 2020, NMCC began enrolling students in four free online healthcare career path training programs to address pandemic workforce needs.

The Maine Community College System hosted fall classes online or in person, or a combination of both formats.

== Impact on transportation ==
=== Highways ===
The Maine Department of Transportation said that since the stay at home order issued by Gov. Mills, traffic on state roads had declined by double digits. This was the case especially in urban areas, though MDOT did not release specific figures as they were incomplete.

MaineDOT has been able to schedule more daytime road work due to the reduced traffic caused by the pandemic, which means expensive night work is not necessary, saving costs. Such projects include maintenance on several Portland-area bridges on Interstate 295, which can now occur at daytime due to a 60 percent traffic reduction from normal levels.

The Maine Turnpike Authority said it was paying all of its employees two weeks of administrative leave, and workers who continued to report to work would still be given it, effectively doubling their pay. A union leader called the arrangement "good" and said that worker's spirits were high as a result. The Authority announced that drivers uncomfortable with handing cash to a toll collector would not be penalized for using the EZ Pass only lanes and paying tolls online or by mail. A decision on waiving cash tolls would be made based on guidance from government health officials. Traffic counts had decreased by 20 percent in the immediate aftermath of the stay at home order, with weekend traffic falling 50 percent. This decrease was due almost exclusively to declines in passenger cars using the road, as commercial traffic only declined 1 percent. It was unclear how the traffic decrease would affect the Turnpike's finances, though executive director Peter Mills said he would recommend to the Authority's board that they go ahead with a vote on a $28 million contract to widen five miles of the highway.

=== Bus service ===
Island Explorer bus service was cancelled for the 2020 season due to the difficulty of complying with social distancing measures, though limited service is planned to resume in 2021.

=== Rail service ===
The Northern New England Passenger Rail Authority announced a suspension of all remaining Amtrak Downeaster service, to begin April 13 and last until April 30, after two prior service reductions. On average, 20 passengers had been using the one remaining round trip to Boston. One round trip between Boston and Brunswick was resumed on June 15, 2020.

=== Air travel ===
Boardings at the Portland International Jetport dropped by 70 percent compared to the prior year for the week ending March 21.

== Statistics ==
COVID-19 pandemic medical cases in Maine by county
County (Note: County where individuals with a positive case reside. Location of diagnosis and treatment may vary.)	Cases (Note: Reported confirmed and probable cases. Actual case numbers are probably higher.)	Hosp.	Deaths	Population (Note: 2018 population estimate from "cases_by_county_history". Maine Department of Health and Human Services.)	Cases / 100k
16 / 16	370,883	10,931	3,672	1,338,404	27,710.8
Androscoggin	32,942	1,059	400	107,679	30,592.8
Aroostook	22,444	668	255	67,111	33,443.1
Cumberland	76,332	1,922	644	293,557	26,002.4
Franklin	8,475	257	95	29,897	28,347.3
Hancock	12,142	445	147	54,811	22,152.5
Kennebec	34,514	915	372	122,083	28,270.9
Knox	9,779	253	84	39,771	24,588.3
Lincoln	8,155	236	64	34,342	23,746.4
Oxford	16,851	516	223	57,618	29,246.1
Penobscot	44,122	1,463	481	151,096	29,201.3
Piscataquis	4,694	186	60	16,800	27,940.5
Sagadahoc	8,174	247	62	35,634	22,938.8
Somerset	15,363	567	142	50,592	30,366.5
Waldo	9,377	254	101	39,694	23,623.2
Washington	6,918	260	92	31,490	21,968.9
York	60,601	1,683	450	206,229	29,385.3
Final update January 13, 2026, with data through January 3, 2026; Data is publicly reported by Maine Department of Health and Human Services

== See also ==
- Timeline of the COVID-19 pandemic in the United States
- COVID-19 pandemic in the United States – for impact on the country
- COVID-19 pandemic – for impact on other countries
