= List of USCAA institutions =

As of July 2026, the United States Collegiate Athletic Association (USCAA) has 85 member institutions from 25 states and the District of Columbia for competition in college athletics.

School	Nickname	City	State	Other affiliations
Albany College of Pharmacy and Health Sciences	Panthers	Albany	New York	Yankee Small College Conference
Alice Lloyd College	Eagles	Pippa Passes	Kentucky	NCCAA Division I
Andrews University	Cardinals	Berrien Springs	Michigan	
The Apprentice School	Builders	Newport News	Virginia	New South Athletic Conference
Atlantis University	Atlanteans	Miami	Florida	New South Athletic Conference
Bay Path University	Wildcats	Longmeadow	Massachusetts	
Beacon College	Blazers	Leesburg	Florida	New South Athletic Conference
Berkeley College	Knights	Woodland Park and New York	New Jersey and New York	North American Conference for Intercollegiate Athletics
Bloomfield College	Bears	Bloomfield	New Jersey	North American Conference for Intercollegiate Athletics
Bluefield State University	Big Blues & Lady Blues	Bluefield	West Virginia	Central Intercollegiate Athletic Association (NCAA Division II)
Bryant & Stratton College, Albany	Bobcats	Albany	New York	North American Conference for Intercollegiate Athletics
Bryant & Stratton College, Buffalo	Bobcats	Buffalo	New York	North American Conference for Intercollegiate Athletics
Bryant & Stratton College, Ohio	Bobcats	Solon	Ohio	North American Conference for Intercollegiate Athletics; Ohio Community College Athletic Conference (NJCAA)
Bryant & Stratton College, Rochester	Bobcats	Rochester	New York	North American Conference for Intercollegiate Athletics
Bryant & Stratton College, Syracuse	Bobcats	Syracuse	New York	North American Conference for Intercollegiate Athletics
Bucks County Community College	Centurions	Newtown	Pennsylvania	Eastern Pennsylvania Athletic Conference (NJCAA); Eastern States Athletic Conference
California Miramar University	Fighting Falcons	La Puente	California	California Collegiate Alliance
Carlow University	Celtics	Pittsburgh	Pennsylvania	Allegheny Mountain Collegiate Conference (NCAA Division III)
Central Maine Community College	Mustangs	Auburn	Maine	Yankee Small College Conference
Central Penn College	Knights	Summerdale	Pennsylvania	Eastern States Athletic Conference
Christendom College	Crusaders	Front Royal	Virginia	Eastern States Athletic Conference
University of Cincinnati Clermont College	Cougars	Batavia	Ohio	
Colorado Mountain College – Leadville	Eagles	Leadville	Colorado	NJCAA
Crown College	Royal Crusaders	Powell	Tennessee	
Denmark Technical College	Panthers	Denmark	South Carolina	Carolinas Junior College Conference (NJCAA); New South Athletic Conference
Diné College	Warriors	Tsaile	Arizona	
East–West University	Phantoms	Chicago	Illinois	
Five Towns College	Sounds	Dix Hills	New York	North American Conference for Intercollegiate Athletics
Florida National University	Conquistadors	Hialeah	Florida	Continental Athletic Conference (NAIA)
Grace University (exploratory)	Talons	Pomona	California	California Collegiate Alliance
Great Bay Community College	Herons	Portsmouth	New Hampshire	Yankee Small College Conference
Harrisburg Area Community College	Hawks	Harrisburg	Pennsylvania	Eastern Pennsylvania Athletic Conference (NJCAA)
Hocking College	Hawks	Nelsonville	Ohio	Ohio Community College Athletic Conference (NJCAA)
John Melvin Christian College (provisional member)	Mohawks	Pensacola	Florida	
John Melvin Christian College – Winter Park (exploratory member)	Mangos	Winter Park	Florida	
John Melvin University (provisional member)	Millers	Crowley	Louisiana	
Kean Jersey City	Gothic Knights	Jersey City	New Jersey	
Kennebec Valley Community College	Lynx	Fairfield and Hinckley	Maine	
Kent State University Tuscarawas	Golden Eagles	New Philadelphia	Ohio	
Lackawanna College	Falcons	Scranton	Pennsylvania	Eastern Pennsylvania Athletic Conference (NJCAA)
Lighthouse Christian College (exploratory)	Makos	Pensacola	Florida	New South Athletic Conference
Maharishi International University	Pioneers	Fairfield	Iowa	
University of Maine at Augusta	Moose	Augusta	Maine	Yankee Small College Conference
University of Maine at Fort Kent	Bengals	Fort Kent	Maine	
Manor College	Blue Jays	Jenkintown	Pennsylvania	Eastern States Athletic Conference
Miami University Hamilton	Harriers	Hamilton	Ohio	
Miami University Middletown	Thunderhawks	Middletown	Ohio	
Mid-Atlantic Christian University	Mustangs	Elizabeth City	North Carolina	New South Athletic Conference
Navajo Technical University	Skyhawks	Crownpoint	New Mexico	
NHTI, Concord's Community College	Lynx	Concord	New Hampshire	Yankee Small College Conference
North American University	Stallions	Stafford	Texas	Red River Athletic Conference (NAIA)
Northern Maine Community College (exploratory)	Falcons	Presque Isle	Maine	
Paul Quinn College	Tigers	Dallas	Texas	HBCU Athletic Conference (NAIA)
Paul Smith's College	Bobcats	Paul Smiths	New York	Yankee Small College Conference
Penn State Beaver	Nittany Lions	Monaca	Pennsylvania	Penn State University Athletic Conference
Penn State DuBois	Nittany Lions	DuBois	Pennsylvania	Penn State University Athletic Conference
Penn State Fayette, The Eberly Campus	Nittany Lions	Uniontown	Pennsylvania	Penn State University Athletic Conference
Penn State Greater Allegheny	Nittany Lions	McKeesport	Pennsylvania	Penn State University Athletic Conference
Penn State Hazleton	Nittany Lions	Hazleton	Pennsylvania	Penn State University Athletic Conference
Penn State Lehigh Valley	Nittany Lions	Center Valley	Pennsylvania	Penn State University Athletic Conference
Penn State Mont Alto	Nittany Lions	Mont Alto	Pennsylvania	Penn State University Athletic Conference
Penn State Schuylkill	Nittany Lions	Schuylkill Haven	Pennsylvania	Penn State University Athletic Conference
Penn State Scranton	Nittany Lions	Dunmore	Pennsylvania	Penn State University Athletic Conference
Penn State Shenango	Nittany Lions	Sharon	Pennsylvania	Penn State University Athletic Conference
Penn State York	Nittany Lions	York	Pennsylvania	Penn State University Athletic Conference
Salem University	Tigers	Salem	West Virginia	Independent (NCAA Division II)
Shaw University	Bears	Raleigh	North Carolina	Central Intercollegiate Athletic Association (NCAA Division II)
Southeastern Illinois College	Falcons	Harrisburg	Illinois	NJCAA Division I
Southern Maine Community College	SeaWolves	South Portland	Maine	Yankee Small College Conference
Southwestern Adventist University	Knights	Keene	Texas	NCCAA Division II
SUNY Environmental Science and Forestry	Mighty Oaks	Syracuse	New York	Hudson Valley Intercollegiate Athletic Conference
Trinity College of Florida	Tigers	Trinity	Florida	
Trinity Washington University	Tigers	Washington	District of Columbia	
United International College	Eagle Rays	Miramar	Florida	
United States Sports Academy	Eagles	Daphne	Alabama	Continental Athletic Conference (NAIA)
URBE University	Tigers	Sweetwater	Florida	New South Athletic Conference
Vaughn College	Warriors	Flushing	New York	
Vermont State Randolph (Vermont Tech)	Green Knights	Randolph Center	Vermont	Yankee Small College Conference
Villa Maria College	Vikings	Buffalo	New York	North American Conference for Intercollegiate Athletics
Virginia State University	Trojans	Ettrick	Virginia	Central Intercollegiate Athletic Association (NCAA Division II)
Washington County Community College	Golden Eagles	Calais	Maine	Yankee Small College Conference
Williamson College of the Trades	Mechanics	Media	Pennsylvania	Eastern States Athletic Conference
Word of Life Bible Institute/Davis College	Huskies	Pottersville	New York	Yankee Small College Conference
Wright State University–Lake Campus	Lakers	Celina	Ohio	
York County Community College	Hawks	Wells	Maine	Yankee Small College Conference

== See also ==
- List of NCAA Division I institutions
- List of NCAA Division II institutions
- List of NCAA Division III institutions
- List of NAIA institutions
- List of NCCAA institutions
- List of NJCAA Division I schools
- List of NJCAA Division II schools
- List of NJCAA Division III schools
