= List of college athletic programs in Maine =

This is a list of college athletic programs in the U.S. state of Maine.

== NCAA ==
=== Division I ===
Full NCAA Division I member colleges in Maine.
– FCS Football

Team	School	City	Conference	Sport sponsorship								
Team	School	City	Conference	Foot- ball	Basketball		Base- ball	Soft- ball	Ice hockey		Soccer	
Team	School	City	Conference	Foot- ball	M	W	Base- ball	Soft- ball	M	W	M	W
Maine Black Bears	University of Maine	Orono	America East	FCS (Note: Maine's football team competes in CAA Football, the technically separate football league operated by the all-sports Coastal Athletic Association.)	Yes	Yes	Yes	Yes	Yes (Note: Maine's ice hockey teams compete in Hockey East.)	Yes	No	Yes

=== Division III ===
Full NCAA Division III member colleges in Maine.
– Football, – Non-football

Team	School	City	Conference	Sport sponsorship								
Team	School	City	Conference	Foot- ball	Basketball		Base- ball	Soft- ball	Ice hockey		Soccer	
Team	School	City	Conference	Foot- ball	M	W	Base- ball	Soft- ball	M	W	M	W
Bates Bobcats	Bates College	Lewiston	NESCAC	Yes	Yes	Yes	Yes	Yes	No	No	Yes	Yes
Bowdoin Polar Bears	Bowdoin College	Brunswick	NESCAC	Yes	Yes	Yes	Yes	Yes	Yes	Yes	Yes	Yes
Colby Mules	Colby College	Waterville	NESCAC	Yes	Yes	Yes	Yes	Yes	Yes	Yes	Yes	Yes
Husson Eagles	Husson University	Bangor	North Atlantic	Yes (Note: Husson's football team competes in the Conference of New England.)	Yes	Yes	Yes	Yes	No	No	Yes	Yes
Maine–Farmington Beavers	University of Maine at Farmington	Farmington	North Atlantic	No	Yes	Yes	Yes	Yes	No	No	Yes	Yes
Maine–Presque Isle Owls	University of Maine at Presque Isle	Presque Isle	North Atlantic	No	Yes	Yes	Yes	Yes	No	No	Yes	Yes
Maine Maritime Mariners	Maine Maritime Academy	Castine	North Atlantic	Yes	Yes	Yes	No	No	No	No	Yes	Yes
New England Nor'easters	University of New England	Biddeford	CNE	Yes	Yes	Yes	No	Yes	Yes	Yes	Yes	Yes
Saint Joseph's Monks	Saint Joseph's College of Maine	Standish	Great Northeast	No	Yes	Yes	Yes	Yes	No	No	Yes	Yes
Southern Maine Huskies	University of Southern Maine	Gorham	Little East	No	Yes	Yes	Yes	Yes	Yes	Yes	Yes	Yes
Thomas Terriers	Thomas College	Waterville	North Atlantic	No	Yes	Yes	Yes	Yes	No	No	Yes	Yes

== USCAA ==
Full USCAA member colleges in Maine.

Team	School	City	Conference
Central Maine Mustangs	Central Maine Community College	Auburn	Yankee Small
Kennebec Valley Lynx	Kennebec Valley Community College	Fairfield and Hinckley	Independent
Maine-Augusta Moose	University of Maine at Augusta	Augusta	Yankee Small
Maine-Fort Kent Bengals	University of Maine at Fort Kent	Fort Kent	Independent
Southern Maine Seawolves	Southern Maine Community College	South Portland	Yankee Small
Washington County Golden Eagles	Washington County Community College	Calais	Yankee Small
York County Hawks	York County Community College	Wells	Yankee Small

== See also ==
- List of NCAA Division I institutions
- List of NCAA Division II institutions
- List of NCAA Division III institutions
- List of NAIA institutions
- List of USCAA institutions
- List of NCCAA institutions
