= WUFK =

Radio station at the University of Maine at Fort Kent (1974–2005)

- Fort Kent, Maine; United States
- Frequencies: 90.3 MHz (1974–1982); 92.1 MHz (1982–2005)

Programming
- Language: English
- Format: College radio

Ownership
- Owner: University of Maine System

History
- First air date: July 1974
- Last air date: November 2005
- Call sign meaning: University of Maine at Fort Kent

Technical information
- Facility ID: 69186
- Class: D
- Power: 10 watts on 90.3; 13.85 watts on 92.1
- HAAT: 40 feet (12 m) on 90.3; −317 feet (−97 m) on 92.1

WUFK was an FM radio station at the University of Maine at Fort Kent that began in July 1974. It was owned by the University of Maine System and licensed to the community of Fort Kent, Maine. Originally on 90.3 MHz, it later moved to 92.1 MHz around 1982 and continued there until its license was canceled on November 7, 2005.
