= National Association of Collegiate Esports =

American collegiate esports association

- Sport: College esports
- Founded: 2016
- Countries: United States Canada
- Website: nacesports.org

The National Association of Collegiate Esports (NACE) is a North American collegiate esports association founded in 2016. It is a nonprofit membership association organized by and on behalf of its members. With its members they are developing structure and tools needed to advance collegiate esports. Together, laying groundwork in: Eligibility, path to graduation, competition and scholarships. NACE is the largest member association of varsity esports programs in North America.

== Esports ==
- Counter-Strike: Global Offensive
- Fortnite
- Hearthstone
- League of Legends
- Overwatch 2
- Rocket League
- Valorant
- Call of Duty: Modern Warfare III (2023 video game)
- Call of Duty: Vanguard
- Dota 2
- Rainbow Six: Siege
- Super Smash Bros. Ultimate
- Chess.com

== Members ==
The association had 42 member colleges and universities in spring 2018 and over 200 by late 2022

Member schools
Institution
Adrian College
Albion College
Albright College
Anna Maria College
Aquinas College
Arcadia University
Ashland University
Baldwin Wallace University
Barry University
Bellevue University
Barton College
Blinn College
Boise State University
Brewton-Parker College
Bridgewater College
Bryant & Stratton College
Buena Vista University
Bushnell University
Butler University
Camden County College
Campbellsville University
Capitol Technology University
Carolina University
Central Christian College of Kansas
Central Michigan University
Central Penn College
Chowan University
Clarke University
Cleary University
Coastal Bend College
Coffeyville Community College
Colorado College
Colorado School of Mines
Cornell College
Columbia College
Columbia International University
Concordia College
Concordia University, St. Paul
Concordia University Nebraska
Cottey College
County College of Morris
Culver-Stockton College
Dakota Wesleyan University
Dallas Baptist University
Davenport University
DeSales University
Dickinson State University
Drexel University
Drury University
Durham College
East Tennessee State University
Eastern University
ECPI University
Edgewood University
Fanshawe College
Faulkner University
Ferris State University
Florida International University
Florida Southern College
Franklin College
Full Sail University
Gallaudet University
George Fox University
George Mason University
Georgia State University
Glenville State University
Grand Valley State University
Great Bay Community College
Harding University
Harrisburg University of Science and Technology
Highland Community College
Holy Family University
Howard Payne University
Immaculata University
Independence Community College
Indiana Institute of Technology
Indiana University East
Iona University
Iowa Central Community College
Irvine Valley College
Jacksonville State University
James Madison University
Juniata College
Kansas State University
Kansas Wesleyan University
Keene State College
Keiser University
Kennesaw State University
Kettering University
Keyano College
Kilgore College
King's College
Lackawanna College
Lake Michigan College
Lakeland University
Lakeshore Technical College
Lawrence Technological University
Lebanon Valley College
Louisiana Tech University
Louisiana State University Shreveport
Lourdes University
Loyola University New Orleans
Lubbock Christian University
Manchester University
Marian University
Marietta College
Marymount University
McMurry University
Messiah University
Michigan Technological University
Mid-America Christian University
Milligan University
Milwaukee School of Engineering
Minnesota State University, Mankato
Misericordia University
Mohave Community College
Montgomery County Community College
Mount Aloysius College
Mount St. Joseph University
Mount Vernon Nazarene University
Neumann University
Neumont College of Computer Science
Newberry College
Nichols College
North Dakota State College of Science
Northeastern State University
Northeastern University
Northern Kentucky University
Northpoint Bible College
Northwest State Community College
Northwestern Michigan College
Northwood University
Ohio Christian University
Ohio Wesleyan University
Oklahoma City University
Old Dominion University
Ozarks Technical Community College
Park University
Pennsylvania College of Technology
Pennsylvania Western University, Edinboro
Point Park University
Post University
Presbyterian College
Purdue University
Randolph-Macon College
Ringling College
Roanoke College
Robert Morris University
Rollins College
Russell Sage College
Saint Francis University
Saint Leo University
Salve Regina University
Seton Hill University
Shawnee State University
Shenandoah University
Siena Heights University
Simpson College
Southeastern Illinois College
Southeastern University
Southern Arkansas University
Southern State Community College
Southern Virginia University
Southwest Minnesota State University
Nelson University
Spoon River College
Spring Hill College
St. Ambrose University
Saint Andrew's
St. Edward's University
St. Lawrence University
University of Health Sciences and Pharmacy in St. Louis
Stephen F. Austin State University
Tennessee Wesleyan University
Texas A&M International University
Texas A&M University–San Antonio
Texas State University
Texas Wesleyan University
Trine University
Truett McConnell University
University of Central Missouri
University of Central Oklahoma
University of Cincinnati
University of Evansville
University of Guam
University of Jamestown
University of Kansas
University of Michigan–Flint
University of Mississippi
University of Missouri
University of Missouri-Kansas City
University of Montana
University of Providence
University of South Carolina Sumter
University of Southern Mississippi
University of the Cumberlands
University of West Georgia
University of Windsor
University of Wisconsin-Stout
University of North Texas at Dallas
Virginia Wesleyan University
Wagner College
Waldorf University
Wayland Baptist University
Wayne State University
West Virginia University Institute of Technology
Potomac State College of West Virginia University
Westcliff University
Western Kentucky University
Wichita State University
Widener University
York College
York County Community College
