= YouCastr =

- Website type: Video Monetization
- Creators: Ariel Diaz, Jeff Hebert, Matt Hodgson, Brad Johnson
- Website: http://www.youcastr.com/
- Commercial: Yes
- Launched: 2007
- Current status: Closed

YouCastr was a video platform that enabled online video sales. The service was designed to offer video broadcasters and producers a new and different way to make money by selling live video broadcasts, on-demand video access, video downloads, and DVDs. The company was founded in June 2007, and was based in Cambridge, Massachusetts. Youcastr closed in mid-2010; and one of the founders made a post reflecting on the process of starting it and running it.

== The YouCastr Platform ==
YouCastr allows content creators and owners an easy way to distribute and sell their videos. Content owners can broadcast live or upload videos. Videos can be sold as Live, On-Demand, Download, and DVDs. Content owners set the price for each of the options and earn 70% of all the earnings. Videos can be bundled into collections and sold together at a discount with On-Demand, Download, and DVD access.

== Partners ==
=== The Kraft Group and New England Patriots ===
YouCastr partnered with The Kraft Group and the New England Patriots to create a joint high school football network for New England. The network focused on broadcasting high school football games in New England and raising awareness of high schools in New England. New England Football broadcast the 2009 Massachusetts High School Football state championships on YouCastr on December 5, 2009.

=== USCAA ===
YouCastr was for a period the Official Broadcast Partner for The United States Collegiate Athletic Association (USCAA), a national organization that exists to provide quality athletic competition on a regional and national level for smaller institutions of higher learning and their student-athletes. The USCAA holds national championships, names All-Americans and scholar-athletes, and promote member schools.

== History ==
The company was founded on June 4, 2007, and launched into private beta on October 3, 2007. The site launched into public beta on February 20, 2008. The initial version of the service was focused on creating a virtual sports bar where fans could interact with each other and share their opinions on sports, but has since focused on broadcasting sports that are not available anywhere currently. The service shifted focus toward the markets of High School, College, and Youth Sports as a video platform and fundraiser for content owners before fully shifting focus toward online video monetization.
