= Elsa Núñez (academic) =

Elsa M. Núñez is an American academic administrator who served as the sixth president of Eastern Connecticut State University (ECSU) from 2006 to 2024. Connecticut Public described her as the first Latina president of a university in New England.

== Early life and education ==
Núñez earned a bachelor's degree from Montclair State College (1970), a master's degree in English from Fairleigh Dickinson University (1973), and a doctorate in linguistics from Rutgers University (1979).

== Academic and administrative career ==
Before joining ECSU, Núñez held senior leadership roles in higher education, including administrative positions within the City University of New York and the University of Maine System. In 2023, Harvard Graduate School of Education named Núñez a President-in-Residence for the 2023–24 academic year.

== President of Eastern Connecticut State University ==
Núñez became president of Eastern Connecticut State University in 2006 and announced her retirement in 2023. Connecticut Mirror reported that she stepped down in 2024 after approximately 18 years in the role. The same reporting described her tenure as longer than typical presidencies and discussed university changes and priorities during that period.

== Audit findings ==
A Connecticut Auditors of Public Accounts report covering ECSU fiscal years 2023 and 2024 identified internal control deficiencies and instances of noncompliance with policies, including documentation issues related to travel reimbursements and purchasing-card records during Núñez's presidency. CT Insider summarized the audit's findings and reported that the university concurred with recommendations and stated it would strengthen internal controls.
