= Washington State Normal School =

Washington State Normal School may refer to several historic institutions in the state of Washington, U.S., or in Washington County, Maine, U.S.

- Washington State Normal School at Bellingham, now Western Washington University
- Washington State Normal School at Ellensburg, now Central Washington University
- Washington State Normal School at Cheney Historic District, now Eastern Washington University
- Washington State Normal School, located in Machias, Maine, now University of Maine at Machias
