= YCCC =

YCCC may refer to:

- Yorkshire County Cricket Club, Yorkshire, England.
- York County Community College, Wells, Maine, United States.
- Youth Cricket Club of Carolina, Greensboro, North Carolina
