= Bret Wallach =

American cultural geographer

- Born: February 5, 1943
- Education: University of California, Berkeley
- Scientific career
- Fields: Geography
- Workplaces: University of Oklahoma; University of Victoria; Pennsylvania State University; University of California, Riverside; University of Maine at Fort Kent

Bret Wallach (February 5, 1943) is an American cultural geographer, and professor at University of Oklahoma.

He graduated from University of California, Berkeley with an A.B. in 1964, M.A. in 1966, and Ph.D. in 1968. He taught at the University of Victoria, Pennsylvania State University, University of California, Riverside, and University of Maine at Fort Kent.

== Awards ==
- 1984 MacArthur Fellows Program

== Works ==
- Understanding the Cultural Landscape. New York: the Guilford Press, 2004. ISBN 978-1-59385-119-4
- Losing Asia: Modernization and the Culture of Development, Baltimore and London: The Johns Hopkins Press, 1996. ISBN 978-0-8018-5170-4
- At Odds with Progress: Americans and Conservation. Tucson: University of Arizona Press, 1991. ISBN 978-0-8165-0917-1
