= Senator Edmunds =

Senator Edmunds may refer to:

- Edward Perrin Edmunds (1925–1967), Maine State Senate
- George F. Edmunds (1828–1919), U.S. Senator from Vermont
- James M. Edmunds (1810–1879), Michigan State Senate
- Paul C. Edmunds (1836–1899), Virginia State Senate
