= Isaac Farrar Mansion =

Historic house in Maine, United States

- Symphony House
- U.S. National Register of Historic Places
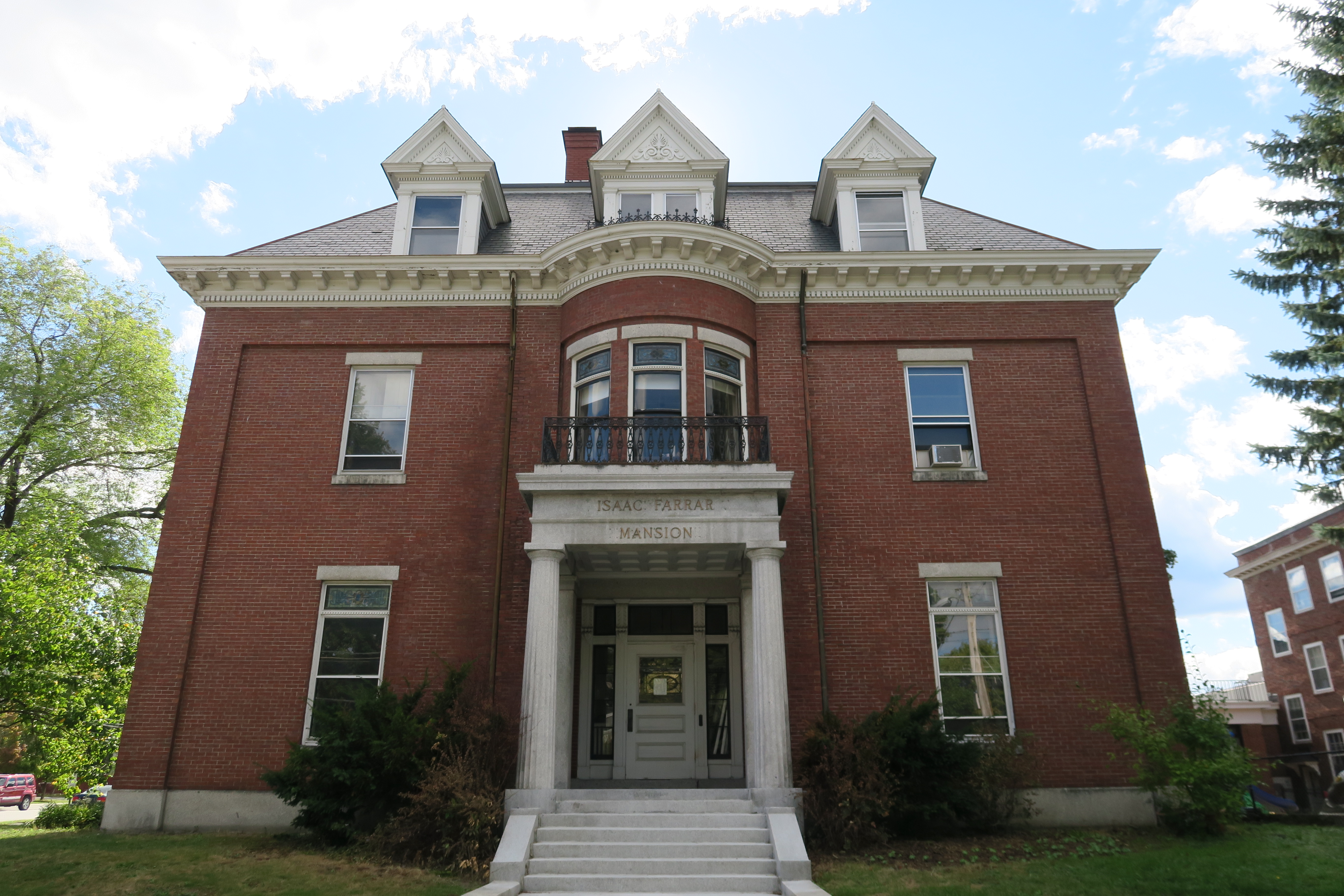
- Isaac Farrar Mansion

- Location within Maine Location within the United States
- Location: 166 Union St., Bangor, Maine
- Coordinates: 44.7996°N 68.7748°W
- Area: 0 acres (0 ha)
- Built: 1833; 193 years ago
- Architect: Richard Upjohn
- Architectural style: Greek Revival
- NRHP reference No.: 72000078
- Added to NRHP: October 26, 1972

The Isaac Farrar Mansion, known for much of the 20th century as Symphony House, is a historic house at 166 Union Street in Bangor, Maine. Built in 1833, it was the first major commission of the noted 19th-century architect Richard Upjohn. Although it was built as a private residence, it was from 1929 to 1972 owned by the Bangor Symphony Orchestra and was home to its music conservatory. It is now part of the Bangor YMCA. The house was listed on the National Register of Historic Places in 1972.

== Description and history ==
The Farrar Mansion is set on the south side of Union Street (Maine State Route 222), at the southwest corner of 2nd Street on Bangor's west side. It is a 2 1/2-story brick building, three bays wide, with a truncated hip roof pierced by steeply pitched gable dormers. Although the styling of the building is predominantly Greek Revival, it has a number of Colonial Revival alterations from the early 20th century, including its front portico and the bay window above.

Design of the house was commissioned by Isaac Farrar, a successful businessman who came to Bangor in 1836. It was the first major commission given to Richard Upjohn, whose early successes in Maine made possible his extensive career as one of the leading architects of the mid-19th century. The house shows that Upjohn was well conversant in the Greek Revival, although his best-known works are Gothic Revival. The house was a private residence until 1911, at which time it was acquired by the University of Maine Law School, which used it as a residency until 1929.

In 1929 the Bangor Symphony Orchestra purchased the property, renamed it "Symphony House", and operated the Northern Conservatory of Music on the premises, also hosting the music branch of the Bangor Public Library. In 1972 the school closed, and the symphony sold the building the following year to the local YMCA, which now uses it as an exhibit and reception space.

== See also ==
- National Register of Historic Places listings in Penobscot County, Maine
