= College of St. Joseph =

Catholic college in Rutland County, Vermont, US

Coordinates: 43.60000°N 73.00722°W

- Other name: CSJ
- Motto: Lumen Via Veritas
- Motto in English: The Light. The Way. The Truth.
- Type: Private liberal arts college
- Active: 1956; 70 years ago – 2019; 7 years ago
- Founder: Sisters of St. Joseph
- Religious affiliation: Roman Catholic
- Location: Rutland, Vermont, U.S.
- Campus: 117 acres (47 ha); Rural
- Colors: Blue & white
- Nickname: Fighting Saints
- Sporting affiliations: NAIA & USCAA Division II
- Website: www.csj.edu
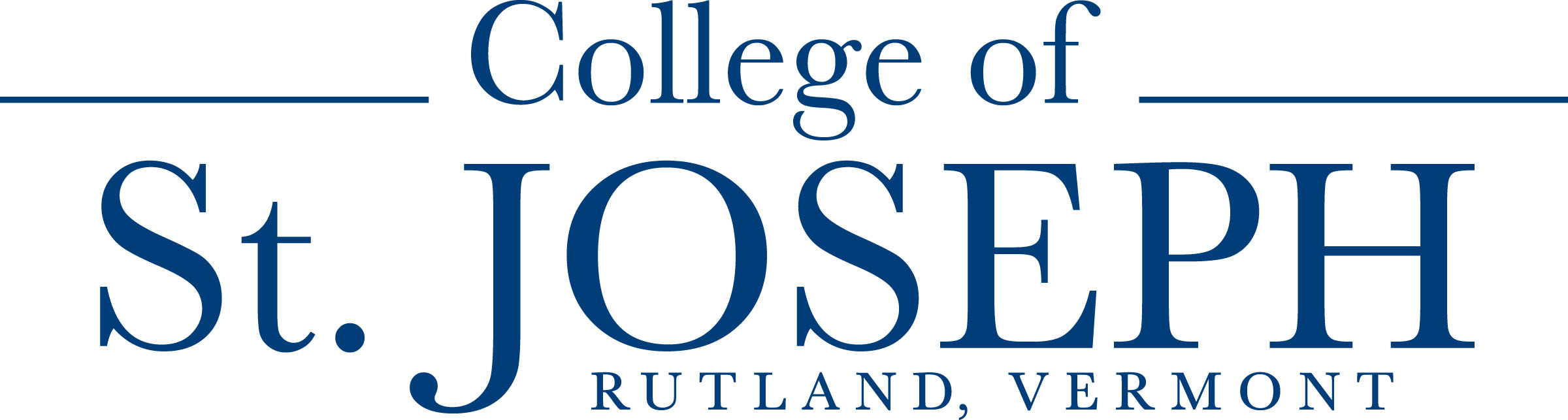

College of St. Joseph was a private Catholic liberal arts college in Rutland County, Vermont, United States. It occupied a 117 acres (0.47 km^{2}) wooded campus. Although the college was accredited by the New England Commission of Higher Education, it was placed on probation in August 2018 because of the college's financial challenges. It closed at the end of the spring 2019 semester.

== Academics ==
=== Accreditation ===
The college was accredited by the New England Commission of Higher Education (NECHE). It was also approved by the State of Vermont Department of Education and some of its programs were accredited or approved by discipline-specific organizations such as the Council of Applied Master's Programs in Psychology and the Board of Psychological Examiners of Vermont.

In August 2018, NECHE placed the college on probation because the college had experienced significant financial challenges including spending nearly all of its endowment. Four months later, NECHE told the college that it had until April 1, 2019, to convince the accreditor that the college was financially viable; if it was unsuccessful, NECHE would withdraw accreditation and require the college to stop teaching at the end of the 2019 spring semester.

=== Undergraduate programs ===
The college offered more than 20 different degree programs in the arts & sciences, business, criminal justice, and psychology & human services. In 2014, the college introduced a social media certificate program and concentration.

=== Graduate programs ===
The college offered a number of master's degree programs in business, education, and psychology and human services. In January 2018, the Traumatology Institute was established to provide advanced education, training, research and humanitarian aid, and was geared towards emergency responders, medical and mental health professionals, and others who work with trauma victims. CSJTI has received full accreditation from the Green Cross Academy of Traumatology, and becomes the only program in the State of Vermont and surrounding area offering certification for this emerging field of study.

== Campus ==
=== Main Campus ===
The main building was St. Joseph Hall, which houses the President's office, External Affairs, Admissions, Financial Aid, the Giorgetti Library, classrooms, faculty offices, computer labs, the Registrar's Office, and more. Tuttle Hall housed the student services offices, a student lounge/waiting room, a 200-seat theater, a chapel, and Campus Ministry. The Athletic Center on campus had a 1,000-seat gymnasium, a weight and cardio room, a racquetball court, and a dance studio. There were also two undergraduate dormitories built in 1967, Roncalli Hall and Medaille Hall.

=== West Campus ===
In 2008, the college purchased the 27-acre (110,000 m^{2}) Clementwood estate from the Sisters of St. Joseph, consisting of the Clementwood Mansion, Bucci Hall/the Carriage House, Avilia Hall, and St. Francis Hall. Clementwood Mansion, built in 1863 by Charles Clement as a private home and later used by the Sisters of St. Joseph as their novitiate, was remodeled over the course of two years, and in spring 2010, the president's office, academic dean's office, and development and alumni relations office moved into Clementwood.

== Demographics ==
In fall 2015, the undergraduate population consisted of 53% men and 47% women. Total enrollment was 327 students. 78% were undergraduates and 22% were graduate students. The racial composition was 64% white, 24% black, and 12% Hispanic.

== Athletics ==
CSJ athletic teams were called the Fighting Saints. The college was a member of the Division II ranks of the United States Collegiate Athletic Association (USCAA), primarily competing in the Yankee Small College Conference from 2011–12 to 2018–19. The Fighting Saints competed in the Sunrise Athletic Conference of the National Association of Intercollegiate Athletics (NAIA) from 2002–03 to 2010–11.

CSJ competed in nine intercollegiate varsity sports: Men's sports included baseball, basketball, golf and soccer; while women's sports included basketball, soccer, softball, and volleyball; and co-ed sports included eSports.

== Notable alumni ==
- Hockey Referee Chris Woods

== See also ==
- List of colleges and universities in the United States
- List of colleges and universities in Vermont
