= Atlantis University =

For-profit university in Miami, Florida, US

- Motto in English: Grow in wisdom
- Type: Private for-profit university
- Academic affiliations: ACCSC, CIE
- Location: Miami, Florida, United States; 25.789065°N 80.189632°W
- Colors: Brown
- Sporting affiliations: USCAA
- Website: www.atlantisuniversity.edu

Atlantis University is a private for-profit university in Miami. It offers degree programs through its schools of Information Technology, Engineering, Business, Health Care, and Foreign Languages. The university offers graduate, undergraduate, diploma and certification courses both onsite and online.

== History ==
In 2023, Florida Palms University, a branch campus of Atlantis University, was closed.
