= Edward Perrin Edmunds =

American politician (1925–1967)

E. Perrin Edmunds

Chair of the Executive Council of Maine
- In office January 5, 1967 – December 17, 1967
- Governor: Kenneth M. Curtis
- Preceded by: Richard Broderick
- Succeeded by: L. Robert Porteous Jr.

Member of the Executive Council of Maine from the 7th district
- In office January 5, 1967 – December 17, 1967
- Governor: Kenneth M. Curtis
- Preceded by: Nathan Cohen
- Succeeded by: Harold L. Stewart
- Constituency: Washington and Aroostook

Member of the Maine Senate from Aroostook County
- In office January 1961 – January 1965 Serving with Edward Cyr and Augusta Christie
- Preceded by: John H. Reed
- Succeeded by: Glenn H. Manuel

Member of the Maine House of Representatives from Fort Fairfield
- In office January 15, 1958 – January 1961
- Preceded by: Lewis G. Hersey
- Succeeded by: Harold H. Hopkinson

Personal details
- Born: Edward Perrin Edmunds; June 6, 1925
- Died: December 17, 1967 (aged 42) Augusta, Maine, U.S.
- Party: Republican
- Occupation: Farmer; politician

Edward Perrin Edmunds (June 6, 1925 – December 17, 1967) was an American politician and potato grower from Maine. Edmunds, a Republican from Fort Fairfield, served from 1957 to 1964 in the Maine Legislature. He spent two terms (1957-1960) in the Maine House of Representatives and two (1961-1964) in the Maine Senate. During his final term in the Senate, he was chosen Majority Leader.

During his time in the Senate, Edmunds was instrumental in the founding of Northern Maine Community College. Edmunds was a large potato farmer and grower. He also served as president of the National Bank of Fort Fairfield.
