= Great Bay Community College =

Public college in Portsmouth, New Hampshire, US

Coordinates: 43°4′19″N 70°47′55″W

- Type: Public community college
- Established: 1945; 81 years ago
- Parent institution: Community College System of New Hampshire
- Academic affiliations: Space-grant
- President: Cheryl Lesser
- Students: 2,217
- Location: Portsmouth, New Hampshire, U.S.
- Campus: Urban
- Colors: Gold and blue
- Sporting affiliations: Yankee Small College Conference (YSCC); United States College Athletic Association (USCAA)
- Mascot: Heron
- Website: www.greatbay.edu

Great Bay Community College (GBCC) is a public community college in Portsmouth, New Hampshire. It is part of the Community College System of New Hampshire and is accredited by the New England Commission of Higher Education. The main campus is in the Pease International Tradeport area of Portsmouth and an additional campus is in Rochester.

== History ==
The college was founded in 1945 as the State Trade School of Portsmouth. In 1949, it was renamed "New Hampshire Technical Institute - Portsmouth". The current name derives from nearby Great Bay, the largest tidal estuary in New Hampshire. The college has changed its name several times:

1949	New Hampshire Technical Institute - Portsmouth
1961	New Hampshire Vocational Technical Institute - Portsmouth
1969	New Hampshire Vocational Technical College - Portsmouth
1989	New Hampshire Technical College - Stratham
1995	New Hampshire Technical College - Manchester/Stratham
2005	New Hampshire Technical College - Stratham/Portsmouth
2008	Great Bay Community College

== Academics ==
Great Bay Community College associate degrees and certificate programs.

=== Specialized accreditation ===
- Business programs - Association of Collegiate Business Schools and Programs (ACBSP)
- Nursing - National League for Nursing Accrediting Commission (NLNAC), full accreditation; New Hampshire Board of Nursing and Nurse Registration, full accreditation
- Surgical Technology - Commission on Accreditation of Allied Health Education Programs (CAAHEP)
- Veterinary Technology - Committee on Veterinary Technology Education and Activities (AVMA-CVTEA)

=== Transfer and articulation agreements ===
As a comprehensive community college, Great Bay has developed partnerships with public and private four-year institutions both in and out of New Hampshire. The New Hampshire Transfer Connections Program allows students to start their education at Great Bay Community College in the Liberal Arts program and transfer to any of the University System of New Hampshire colleges or universities, including a dual admission program with the University of New Hampshire.

== Rochester campus ==
In May 2012, Great Bay Community College opened the Advanced Technology & Academic Center (ATAC) in Rochester to offer traditional academic programs as well as a certificate program in Advanced Composites Manufacturing. ATAC is the largest single project under the statewide Advanced Manufacturing Partnership in Education initiative formed by the Community College System of New Hampshire under the federal TAACCCT-NH grant, with a $19.9 million grant from the U.S. Department of Labor, Employment & Training Administration. The Northeast Economic Developers Association named Great Bay Community College's Advanced Technology & Academic Center "Project of the Year" on 8 September 2014, at its annual conference. The award recognizes major economic development projects based on job creation, capital investment, leveraging of development resources, use of public/private and/or intergovernmental partnerships and benefits to the surrounding community and/or environment. John Ratzenberger, actor and advocate for advanced manufacturing, was a featured speaker at the 2014 Distinguished Leaders Awards and praised Great Bay Community College for their work.

== Athletics ==
The college's athletic teams, the Herons, compete in the United States Collegiate Athletic Association. GBCC is a member of the Yankee Small College Conference. The school's official colors are blue and gold. The school mascot is a heron.

- Men's and women's basketball
- Women's volleyball
- Co-ed golf and bowling
- Baseball (starting 2017)
