= Florida National University =

Private university in Hialeah, Florida, US

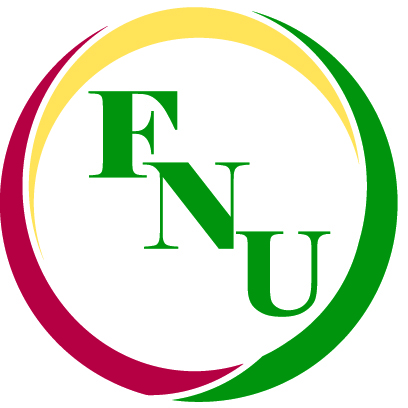
- Former names: Florida International Institute (1988); Florida International College (1988–1989); Florida National College (1989–2012)
- Motto: Opens Doors to the Future
- Type: Private for-profit university
- Established: 1988; 38 years ago
- Accreditation: SACS, ACBSP, ACEN, CCNE, CoARC, CAPTE
- President: Frank Andreu
- Academic staff: 104 Full-time & 83 Part-time
- Students: 2,638
- Undergraduates: 2,359
- Postgraduates: 279
- Location: Hialeah, Florida, United States; 25.8617°N 80.3220°W
- Campus: Multiple sites
- Colors: Red, Yellow & Green
- Nickname: Conquistadors
- Sporting affiliations: NAIA – Continental
- Website: www.fnu.edu

Florida National University is a private for-profit university in Hialeah, Florida. It was established in 1988. The student body is diverse, though primarily Hispanic. It is accredited by the Southern Association of Colleges and Schools (SACS).

== Accreditation ==
Florida National University is accredited by the Southern Association of Colleges and Schools Commission on Colleges (SACSCOC). Florida National University is also programmatically accredited by several agencies including the Accreditation Commission for Business Schools and Programs (ACBSP), the Accreditation Commission for Education in Nursing (ACEN), the Commission on Accreditation for Physical Therapy Education (CAPTE), the Commission on Collegiate Nursing Education (CCNE), and the Commission on Accreditation for Respiratory Care (CoARC).

== Campus ==
Florida National University offers programs at three locations. Its main campus is in Hialeah, the South Campus is in Miami and the Training Center is in Hialeah.

== Student population ==
In 2024, Florida National University awarded 1,452 degrees across all undergraduate and graduate programs (81.8% undergraduate and 18.2% graduate degrees awarded).

Florida National University has a total enrollment of 2,638 students, including 2,359 undergraduate students and 279 graduate and post-graduate students. Based on attendance status, 33% of undergraduates are enrolled part-time and 67% are enrolled full-time. Graduate students are enrolled at 78% full-time and 22% part-time.

== Athletics ==
The Florida National athletic teams are called the Conquistadors. The university is a member of the National Association of Intercollegiate Athletics (NAIA), primarily competing as an NAIA Independent within the Continental Athletic Conference since the 2018–19 academic year. The Conquistadors also compete as a member of the United States Collegiate Athletic Association (USCAA) as an Independent since their athletic program debut in the 2013–14 school year.

Florida National competes in 13 intercollegiate varsity sports: Men's sports include baseball, basketball, cross country, soccer, tennis and track & field; while women's sports include basketball, cross country, soccer, softball, tennis, track & field and volleyball.

== Name dispute ==
In May 2013, Florida International University sued Florida National University over the similarity of the institution's names. Florida International University lost the lawsuit because it was deemed frivolous and was forced to pay FNU's attorney fees.
