= Northern Maine Community College =

Community college in Presque Isle, Maine, U.S.

Coordinates: 46°41′39″N 68°2′4″W

- Former name: Northern Maine Technical College
- Type: Public community college
- Established: 1961; 65 years ago
- Parent institution: Maine Community College System
- President: Timothy D. Crowley
- Students: 981
- Location: Presque Isle, Maine, United States
- Campus: 87 acres (350,000 m^{2}), Rural
- Mascot: Falcons
- Website: www.nmcc.edu

Northern Maine Community College is a public community college in Presque Isle, Maine. It is part of the Maine Community College System. The 87-acre (350,000 m^{2}) campus was founded in 1961 on the grounds of the former Presque Isle Air Force Base.

== Academics ==
The college awards the Associate's degree in a variety of subjects. The college is split into four departments: Arts & Sciences, Business Technology, Nursing & Allied Health, Trade & Technical.

=== Arts & Sciences ===
This department has programs in Liberal Studies and Early Childhood Education.

=== Business Technology ===
This department is accredited by the Association of Collegiate Business Schools and Programs (ACBSP).

=== Nursing & Allied Health ===
The associate degree nursing program is accredited by the National League for Nursing Accrediting Commission, Inc.

== Sports ==
NMCC Falcons are a United States Collegiate Athletic Association (USCAA) school that compete in the Northern Division of the Yankee Small College Conference.

== Notable people ==
- Anne Dauphinais, member Connecticut House of Representatives
- Edward Perrin Edmunds, state legislator who helped found the college
