= Bangor Symphony Orchestra =

Orchestra in Maine, United States

The Bangor Symphony Orchestra is one of the oldest continually-operating professional orchestras in the United States. Based in Bangor, Maine, it was founded in 1896 by Abbie N. Garland and Horace M. Pullen, its first director. The present organization was incorporated in 1918.
