= Eastern Maine Community College =

Public college in Bangor, Maine, US

- Former names: Eastern Maine Vocational Technical Institute; Eastern Maine Technical College
- Type: Public community college
- Established: 1966; 60 years ago
- Parent institution: Maine Community College System
- President: Julius Edwards
- Location: Bangor, Maine, United States; 44°49′34″N 68°44′38″W
- Campus: 72 acres (29 ha)
- Website: www.emcc.edu
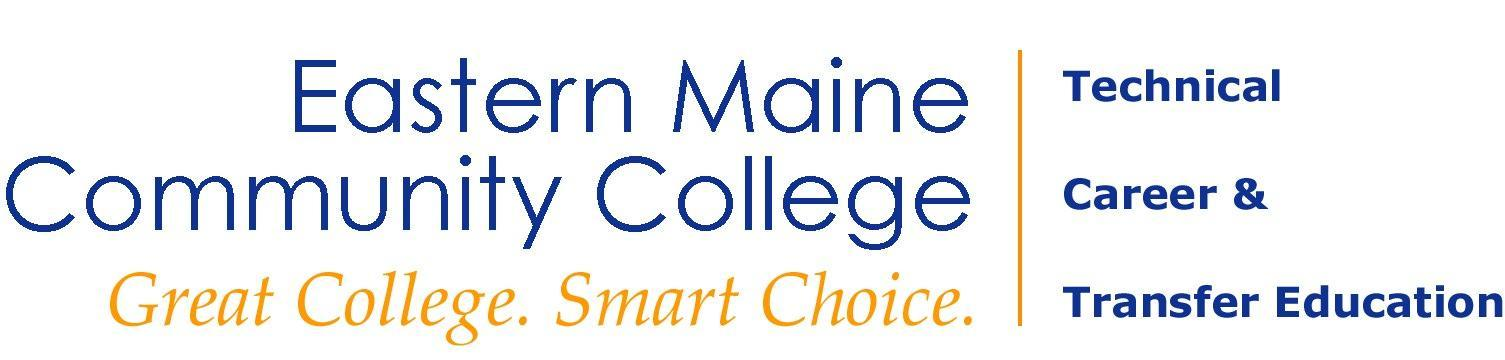

Eastern Maine Community College (EMCC) is a public community college in Bangor, Maine. It offers over 30 one- and two-year degree programs. The college offers technical, liberal arts, and career programs at the undergraduate level.

== History ==
Eastern Maine was established in 1966 by act of the Maine Legislature, as Eastern Maine Vocational Technical Institute (EMVTI). In 1989, the name was changed to Eastern Maine Technical College (EMTC), and changed again in 2003 from "Technical" to "Community". Located in the center of Bangor, Maine, its 72-acre campus is next to Interstate 95, a short distance from Eastern Maine Medical Center.
