= University of Maine at Machias =

Public university in Machias, Maine, US

- Former names: Washington State Normal School (1909–1952); The Washington State Teachers College (1952–1965); The Washington State College (1965–1971)
- Motto: Service, Fellowship, Idealism
- Type: Public college
- Established: 1909; 117 years ago
- Parent institution: University of Maine, University of Maine System
- Accreditation: New England Commission of Higher Education (NECHE)
- Affiliations: USCAA
- Chancellor: Dannel Malloy
- President: Joan Ferrini-Mundy
- Faculty: 61 full-time & part-time
- Location: Machias, Maine, United States; 44°42′35″N 67°27′25″W
- Campus: 243 acres (98 ha); Rural 243 acres (980,000 m^{2})
- Colors: Maine blue, white, and navy
- Nickname: Black Bears
- Mascot: Bananas T. Bear
- Website: machias.edu
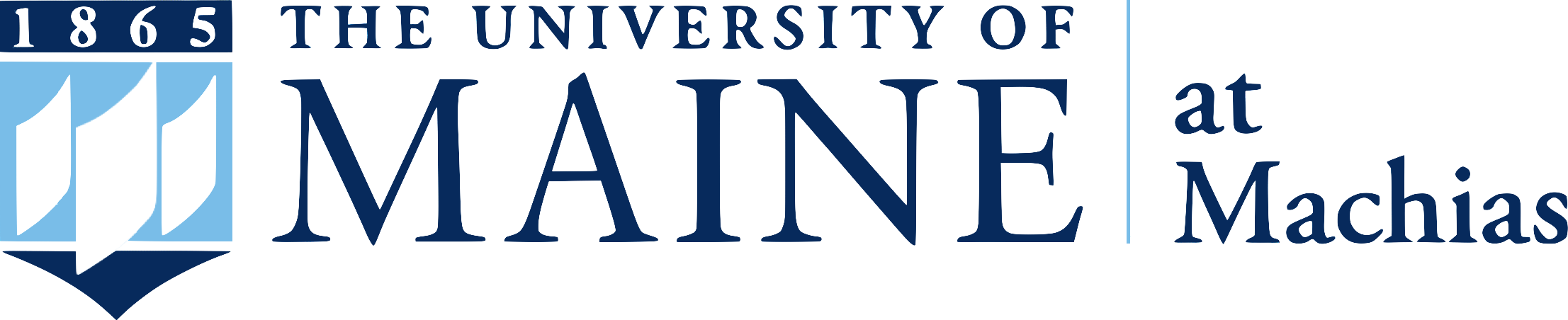

The University of Maine at Machias (UMaine Machias or UMM) is a satellite campus in Machias, Maine. It is part of the University of Maine System. The institution was founded in 1909 as a normal school for educating teachers.

== History ==
The original name of school was the Washington State Normal School. It was later renamed to the University of Maine at Machias. In April 2016, the institution announced that it would enter into a partnership with the much larger University of Maine in Orono. The agreement included the sharing of administrators between the institutions.

== Academics ==
The University of Maine at Machias offers nine undergraduate majors.

== Campus ==
The University of Maine at Machias is part of the University of Maine System. The university was founded in 1909. The campus occupies 243 acres (980,000 m^{2}) in rural downeast coastal Maine on the Machias River.

== Student life ==
=== Activities ===
All student organizations are run independently through an elected process with oversight by a Student Senate. Students are responsible for meetings, financial organization, and group meetings.

=== Greek organizations ===
There are seven Greek organizations on campus, four fraternities and three sororities.

== Sunrise Senior College ==
The University of Maine at Machias is the home of Sunrise Senior College, which is one of 16 enrichment experience institutions in Maine for people 50 and over and their partners of any age. There are no academic credentials required to attend. Founded in 2002 as part of the Maine Senior College Network, Sunrise Senior College offers most of its classes on the UMM campus. The courses are not for credit, are taught by volunteers with expertise in their areas, and no one needs to be a college (or even high school) graduate to attend.

== Athletics ==
The Maine-Machias (UMM) athletic teams were called the Clippers. The university campus-based college was a member of the United States Collegiate Athletic Association (USCAA), primarily competing in the Yankee Small College Conference (YSCC) from 2011–12 to 2019–20. The Clippers previously participated in the Sunrise Athletic Conference of the National Association of Intercollegiate Athletics (NAIA) from 2002–03 to 2010–11.

UMM competed in five intercollegiate varsity sports: Men's sports included basketball and soccer; while women's sports included basketball, soccer and volleyball.

On July 21, 2020, Machias suspended all sports due to financial losses and the ongoing COVID-19 pandemic.
