= University of Maine System =

Public university system in Maine, US

- Type: State university system
- Established: 1968; 58 years ago
- Budget: $200 million
- Chancellor: Dannel Malloy
- Students: 25,286 (fall 2024)
- Undergraduates: 20,044 (fall 2024)
- Postgraduates: 4,965 (fall 2024)
- Location: Maine, U.S.
- Colors: Light blue, dark blue, and white
- Website: www.maine.edu

The University of Maine System (UMaine System or UMS; also branded as Maine's Public Universities) was created in 1968 by the Maine Legislature and consists of eight institutions, each with a distinct mission and regional character. Combined, there are approximately 33,000 students enrolled at these institutions. The UMS includes every institution with a name including University of Maine, and the University of Southern Maine. Public colleges in Maine that are not part of the UMS are the Maine Maritime Academy and the members of the Maine Community College System.

== Member institutions ==
Locations of schools in the University of Maine System

Institution	Location	Established	Enrollment	Nickname	Athletic conference	Colors
University of Maine	Orono	1865	10,840	Black Bears	America East (AmEast) (NCAA D-I)	Maine blue, white, and navy
University of Maine at Augusta	Augusta	1965	3,034	Moose	Yankee (YSCC) (USCAA D-II)	Blue and green
University of Maine at Farmington	Farmington	1864	1,524	Beavers	North Atlantic (NAC) (NCAA D-III)	Maroon, gold, and gray
University of Maine at Fort Kent	Fort Kent	1878	770	Bengals	Independent (USCAA)	Green and yellow
University of Maine at Machias	Machias	1909	293	Black Bears	N/A	Maine blue, white, and navy
University of Maine at Presque Isle	Presque Isle	1903	1,509	Owls	North Atlantic (NAC) (NCAA D-III)	Blue and gold
University of Southern Maine	Gorham & Portland	1878	6,257	Huskies	Little East (LEC) (NCAA D-III)	Royal blue and gold
University of Maine School of Law	Portland	1962	277	N/A		

== Administration ==
The system's board of trustees consists of 16 members; 15 are appointed by the governor and approved by the Maine Legislature with the Maine Commissioner of Education serving as a member ex officio. Members are appointed for a five-year term and may be reappointed once. A student member of the board is appointed for a single two-year term.

=== Chancellors ===
Name	Term Began	Term Ended
Robert Woodbury	1986	1993
Terry MacTaggart	1998	2001
Joseph W. Westphal	2002	2006
Terry MacTaggart	2006	2007
Richard Pattenaude	2007	2012
James H. Page	2012	2019
Dannel Malloy	2019	--

=== Notable trustees ===
Name	Term Began	Term Ended
Karl Turner	2011	2016
Gregory G. Johnson	2011	2016
Stephen Bowen	2011	--
