= Yankee Small College Conference =

USCAA athletic conference

- Conference: USCAA
- Founded: 2005
- Sports fielded: 12; men's: 6; women's: 6
- Division: Division II
- No. of teams: 11 full, 2 affiliate (12 full in 2026)
- Headquarters: St. Johnsbury, Vermont
- Official website: http://www.yankeeconference.org/

Yankee Small College Conference is a Division II conference in the United States Collegiate Athletic Association (USCAA). The conference consists of two-year and four-year schools from Maine, New Hampshire, Vermont, and New York State. The conference hosted its first championships in the 2008–09 season, and in 2011, the conference expanded to include Hampshire College and four new members from the disbanded Sunrise Athletic Conference of the National Association of Intercollegiate Athletics (NAIA).

== Member schools ==
The YSCC currently has 11 full members, all but 4 are public schools.

=== Current members ===
Institution	Location	Founded	Affiliation	Enrollment	Nickname	Joined (Note: Represents the calendar year when fall sports competition begins.)
Albany College of Pharmacy and Health Sciences	Albany, New York	1881	Non-profit, & Nonsectarian	1,384	Panthers	2020
Central Maine Community College	Auburn, Maine	1963	Public (Note: Also a junior college.)	2,700	Mustangs	2008
Great Bay Community College	Portsmouth, New Hampshire	1945	Public	2,217	Herons	2008
Hampshire College (Note: Hampshire College will drop out of the conference on December 31, 2026, when the school closes permanently.)	Amherst, Massachusetts	1965	Non-profit, & Nonsectarian	1,400	Black Sheep	2011
NHTI - Concord's Community College	Concord, New Hampshire	1961	Public	3,926	Lynx	2008
Paul Smith's College	Paul Smiths, New York	1946	Non-profit, & Nonsectarian	1,000	Bobcats	2011
Southern Maine Community College	South Portland, Maine	1946	Public	7,006	Seawolves	2008
University of Maine at Augusta	Augusta, Maine	1965	Public (Note: Part of the University of Maine System.)	6,000	Moose	2008
Vermont State University–Randolph	Randolph, Vermont	1866	Public (Note: Also a technical college.)	1,453	Knights	2011
Word of Life/Davis College	Johnson City, New York	1900	Baptist	441	Huskies	2024
York County Community College	Wells, Maine	1994	Public	1,708	Hawks	2021

=== Future member ===
The YSCC will have a new full-member, which is also a public school:

Institution	Location	Founded	Affiliation	Enrollment	Nickname	Joined (Note: Represents the calendar year when fall sports competition begins.)
Washington County Community College	Calais, Maine	1969	Public (Note: Part of the Maine Community College System.)	500	Golden Eagles	2026

=== Affiliate members ===
The YSCC currently has two affiliate members, which is also are public schools:

Institution	Location	Founded	Affiliation	Enrollment	Nickname	Joined (Note: Represents the calendar year when fall sports competition begins.)	Primary conference	YSCC sport(s)
Kennebec Valley Community College	Fairfield, Maine	1969	Public (Note: Part of the Maine Community College System.)	482	Lynx	2025	USCAA Independent	Golf
Northern Essex Community College	Haverhill, Massachusetts	1961	Public (Note: Also a junior college.)	5,115	Knights	2020	Massachusetts (MCCAA) (Note: Currently an NJCAA athletic conference.) (NJCAA Region XXI)	Softball

=== Former members ===
The YSCC had 3 former full members, one of them was a private school:

Institution	Location	Founded	Affiliation	Enrollment	Nickname	Joined (Note: Represents the calendar year when fall sports competition begins.)	Left (Note: Represents the calendar year when spring sports competition ends.)	Current conference
College of St. Joseph	Rutland, Vermont	1956	Catholic (Diocese of Burlington)	N/A	Fighting Saints	2011	2019	Closed in 2019
University of Maine at Machias	Machias, Maine	1909	Public (Note: Part of the University of Maine System.)	800	Clippers	2011	2020	N/A (Note: Maine–Machias suspended its athletics program after the 2019–20 school year.)
Unity College	Unity, Maine	1965	Non-profit & Nonsectarian	2,923	Rams	2008	2020	Closed in 2020

== Conference sports ==
Conference sports
Sport	Men's	Women's
Baseball	✓	
Basketball	✓	✓
Bowling	✓	✓
Cross country	✓	✓
Golf	✓	
Soccer	✓	✓
Softball		✓
Volleyball		✓

== See also ==
- Hudson Valley Intercollegiate Athletic Conference
- Penn State University Athletic Conference
