= Washington County Community College =

Public college in Calais, Maine, US

- Motto: Discover Choices - Create Success
- Type: Public community college
- Established: 1969; 57 years ago
- Parent institution: Maine Community College System
- President: Susan Mingo
- Students: 500
- Location: Calais, Maine, United States; 45°09′58″N 67°14′35″W
- Campus: Rural
- Sporting affiliations: USCAA – YSCC
- Mascot: Golden Eagle
- Website: www.wccc.me.edu

Washington County Community College (WCCC) is a public community college in Calais in Washington County, Maine. The college is on a hillside overlooking the St. Croix River Valley at the edge of a 400-acre (1.6 km^{2}) campus of mature woods and fields.

WCCC is part of the Maine Community College System. Founded in 1969, Washington County Community College (WCCC) offers associate degree programs, diplomas, and certificates. The Liberal Studies program offers students the opportunity to obtain their first two years of a baccalaureate credential at WCCC before transferring to another college or university. WCCC has a number of program articulation agreements with four-year institutions throughout the state to assist students to transfer upon meeting the necessary course requirements.

== Athletics ==
The Washington County athletic teams are called the Golden Eagles. The community college is a member of the United States Collegiate Athletic Association (USCAA), primarily competing as an Independent.

WCCC competes in six intercollegiate varsity sports: Men's sports include basketball, cross country golf; while women's sports include basketball, cross country and golf.

On December 18, 2025, WCCC got an invitation to join the Yankee Small College Conference (YSCC), beginning the 2026–27 academic year.
