= Maine College of Health Professions =

Private health professions college in Portland, Maine

- Former name: Central Maine General Hospital Training School
- Type: Private not-for-profit
- Established: 1891; 135 years ago
- President: Dr. Monika Bissell
- Location: Lewiston, Maine, United States
- Campus: Urban
- Website: mchp.edu

The Maine College of Health Professions (MCHP) is a private college in Lewiston, Maine, affiliated with Central Maine Medical Center. It was founded in 1891 and began granting associate degrees in 1977, taking its current name in 2014.

== History ==
The Central Maine General Hospital Training School was established in 1891. It was a diploma-granting school until 1977, when it began offering a two-year nursing degree under the name Central Maine Medical Center School of Nursing and earned accreditation from the New England Association of Schools and Colleges. It was renamed again in 2007, this time to the Central Maine Medical Center College of Nursing and Health Professions, and again in 2014 to the Maine College of Health Professions, the name it has today.

== Academics ==
MCHP offers two bachelor's degrees, the Bachelor of Science in Nursing and the Bachelor of Science in Medical Imaging, as well as three associate degrees (Nursing RN, Radiologic Technology, and Health Science), three advanced certification programs (Sonography, Mammography, and Computed Tomography), and several healthcare certificates. The BSN program is offered 100% online.

The college was named a top 30 professional college by Forbes in 2017. Newsweek similarly recognized the college in 2019 and 2021, naming it the 15th and then the 13th best in the nation for return on investment.

73% of MCHP students attend part-time.
