= University of Maine at Augusta =

Public college in Augusta, Maine, US

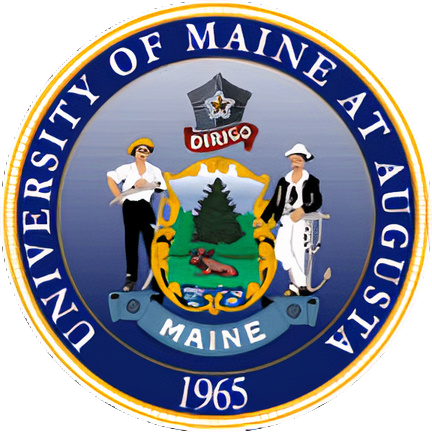
- Type: Public college
- Established: 1965; 61 years ago
- Parent institution: University of Maine System
- Affiliations: USCAA Division II – YSCC
- Chancellor: Dannel Malloy
- President: Jenifer Cushman
- Students: 3,034 (fall 2024)
- Undergraduates: 2,935 (fall 2024)
- Postgraduates: 99 (fall 2024)
- Location: Augusta, Maine, United States; 44°20′18″N 69°47′50″W
- Campus: Urban
- Colors: Navy and Green
- Nickname: Moose
- Mascot: Augustus the Moose
- Website: www.uma.edu

The University of Maine at Augusta (UMaine Augusta or UMA) is a public college in Augusta, Maine, United States. It is part of the University of Maine System. UMA provides baccalaureate and select associate degrees and master's degrees for residents of Maine. The university has campuses in Augusta and Bangor, seven Center locations and courses offered online.

== History ==
The University of Maine at Augusta was established in 1965 by an act of the 102nd Maine Legislature as a continuing education division of the University of Maine. In September, 1967, it was approved as a campus of the University of Maine and began offering day and evening classes. In 1971, it became a separate campus in the University of Maine system. In 1995, the University of Maine System Board of Trustees added University College of Bangor (UCB) to UMA. The university now has eight locations besides the Augusta campus, in Bangor, Brunswick, East Millinocket, Ellsworth, Lewiston, Rockland, Rumford and Saco.

=== Presidents ===
- Joseph S. Szakas (interim)
- Jenifer Cushman (2023-present)

== Academics ==
Undergraduate demographics as of Fall 2023
Race and ethnicity	Total
White	81%
Hispanic	5%
Black	4%
Two or more races	4%
Unknown	3%
American Indian/Alaska Native	1%
Asian	1%
International student	1%
Economic diversity
Low-income (Note: The percentage of students who received an income-based federal Pell grant intended for low-income students.)	49%
Affluent (Note: The percentage of students who are a part of the American middle class at the bare minimum.)	51%

The University of Maine at Augusta is divided into two primary academic colleges: College of Arts and Sciences and College of Professional Studies. UMA offers 3 master's degrees, 25 baccalaureate degrees, 16 associate degrees, and 46 non-degree certificate programs.

== Athletics ==
The Maine–Augusta (UMA) athletic teams are called the Moose. The college is a member of the United States Collegiate Athletic Association (USCAA), primarily competing in the Yankee Small College Conference (YSCC) since the 2011–12 academic year. The Moose previously participated in the Sunrise Athletic Conference of the National Association of Intercollegiate Athletics (NAIA) from 2002–03 to 2010–11.

Maine–Augusta (UMA) competes in 11 intercollegiate varsity sports. Men's sports include basketball, cross country, soccer and track & field (outdoor); women's sports include basketball, cross country, soccer and track & field (outdoor); and co-ed sports include bowling, eSports and golf.
