= Southern Maine Community College =

College in South Portland and Brunswick, Maine, US

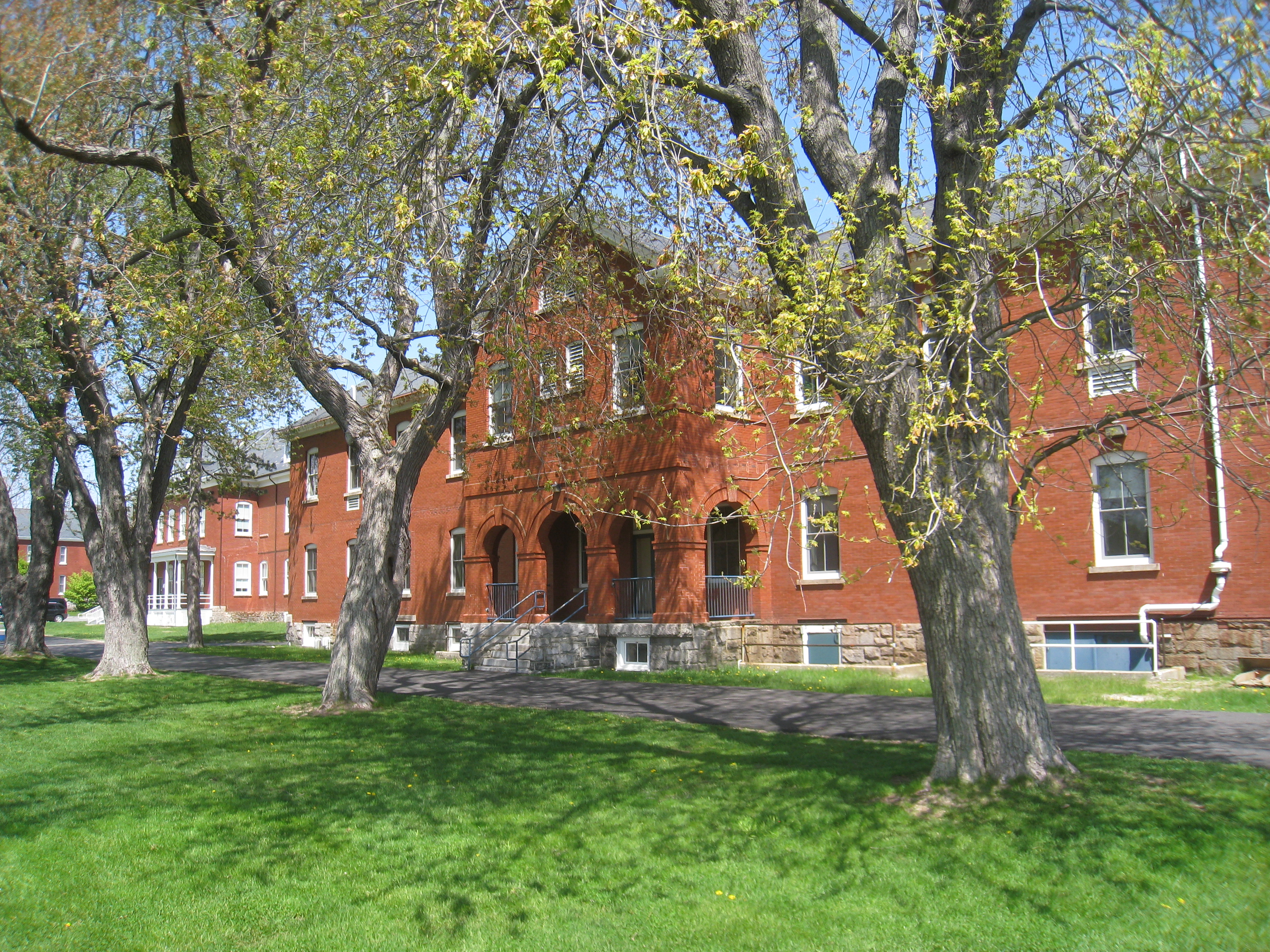
- Former names: Maine Vocational Technical Institute, Southern Maine Vocational Technical Institute, Southern Maine Technical College
- Motto: Envision a Future
- Type: Public community college
- Established: 1946; 80 years ago
- Parent institution: Maine Community College System
- Academic affiliations: Space-grant
- President: Kristen Miller
- Students: 7006
- Location: South Portland and Brunswick, Maine, United States; 43°38′53″N 70°13′41″W
- Campus: Suburban
- Nickname: SeaWolves
- Sporting affiliations: USCAA – YSCC
- Website: www.smccme.edu

Southern Maine Community College is a public community college with campuses in South Portland and Brunswick, Maine. It is part of the Maine Community College System.

== History ==
Southern Maine Community College (SMCC) opened in Augusta, Maine in 1946 under the name "Maine Vocational Technical Institute" as a day school to serve World War II veterans who needed training to learn new skills in a post-war economy.

Having outgrown its space in Augusta, MVTI and its 156 students moved in the summer of 1952 to the site of the decommissioned Fort Preble in South Portland. It is located across Portland Harbor from the city of Portland, the largest city in Maine, on a site overlooking Casco Bay.

In 1964 the name was changed to Southern Maine Vocational Technical Institute (SMVTI) and authorization was received to award Associate in Applied Science degrees.

Through the years, the institution evolved from a technical institute into an accredited college. The first Associate of Applied Science degree students were enrolled in 1968, and the first A.A.S. degrees were awarded two years later.

In the late 1980s, the Maine Legislature changed the name of the state Vocational Technical Institute System to the Maine Technical College System, and SMVTI changed its name to Southern Maine Technical College, with similar name changes at other colleges within the system.

The college in 1998 added an Associate in Arts degree in liberal studies to its offerings, a major step in the evolution to a comprehensive community college. The transformation was completed in 2003 when the Maine Legislature passed legislation establishing the Maine Community College System, resulting in SMTC becoming Southern Maine Community College.

In 2011, SMCC opened a second campus at Brunswick Landing in the nearby town of Brunswick, Maine, home of the former Brunswick Naval Air Station. The college now has more than 6,000 students who come from across Maine and New England, from other states outside of New England and from other nations. The college offers more than 40 degree and certificate programs in five different academic divisions: Applied Technology, Arts & Sciences, Health Sciences, Public Safety and Business and Information Technology.

=== History of Fort Preble ===
During the Revolutionary War, a temporary fortification known as Fort Hancock was built on a point of land on the eastern shore of South Portland, Maine (then part of Cape Elizabeth). In 1808, under direction of Henry A. S. Dearborn, Fort Hancock was acquired by the federal government and was expanded, partly to enforce a trade embargo that President Thomas Jefferson enacted against Great Britain and France. The newly expanded fort, now called Fort Preble, was named after Commodore Edward Preble.

Fort Prevel was established as a Second System Fort in 1808 by Henry A. S. Dearborn to defend Portland Harbor. Modifications to upgrade it to a Third System Fort were started but never reached completion. It received continued use through the U.S. Civil War, the Spanish–American War, World War I and World War II. Four Endicott Period batteries were installed after the Spanish–American War. An additional battery was constructed during World War II. On July 31, 1947 it was deactivated and declared surplus in 1950.

=== Execution at Fort Preble ===
On July 15, 1863, Billy Laird, a private in the 17th Maine Regiment, was executed by firing squad at Fort Preble after being charged with desertion. Laird was the only Maine soldier in the Civil War to be executed for desertion.

== Campuses ==
SMCC has two campuses, in South Portland and in Brunswick. It also offers classes at several satellite locations and online.

The South Portland Campus is located on an 80-acre site on the South Portland waterfront and is home to more than 50 buildings that house classrooms and college administrators, faculty and staff. The campus also has two residence halls and athletic facilities, as well as a lighthouse, a beach and old bunkers that were once part of Fort Preble.

The Midcoast Campus in Brunswick opened in 2011 and is located at Brunswick Landing, the site of the former Brunswick Naval Air Station. The campus has four primary buildings: the L.L.Bean Learning Commons and Health Science Center, Orion Residence Hall, the Maine Advanced Technology and Engineering Center (MATEC), and the Academic Building. The L.L.Bean Learning Commons opened in 2014 with a library, advising offices, quiet study rooms, a café, and laboratories and classrooms for Nursing and Health Sciences students.

=== Online ===
SMCC also offers online and hybrid (in-class and online) courses and a full online liberal studies degree.

=== Peter A. McKernan Hospitality Center ===
The McKernan Center served as officers' quarters from the Revolutionary War through World War II when the site was a military fort. In 1993, the center was renovated into a conference and lodging facility and is now utilized for students who are attending SMCC in the Culinary Arts and Hospitality Management programs. The center overlooks Fort Preble and Portland Harbor.

=== Residence halls ===
Most students commute to SMCC, but the college also has three residence halls (two on its South Portland Campus and one on its Midcoast Campus).

Spring Point and Surfsite Residence Halls are located on the South Portland Campus and accommodate roughly 450 students a semester. Orion Residence Hall on the Midcoast Campus served as bachelor officers' quarters when the Brunswick Naval Air Station was open.

== Enrollment ==
After transitioning from a technical college to a community college in 2002, SMCC's enrollment more than doubled in just a few years to more than 6,000 students.

SMCC graduates typically directly enter the workforce or continue their education at a baccalaureate college of university. SMCC has agreements that offer transfer options to nearly 70 degree programs at over 20 colleges and universities.

=== Athletics ===
Southern Maine Community College has seven sports teams that are members of the United States Collegiate Athletic Association (USCAA) and the Yankee Small College Conference (YSCC), the New England regional league of the USCAA. The college offers men's and women's basketball, men's and women's soccer, baseball, softball and coed golf. The HUB Athletic Center features a gymnasium, locker rooms, a fitness center and a weight room.

== Shoreway Arboretum ==
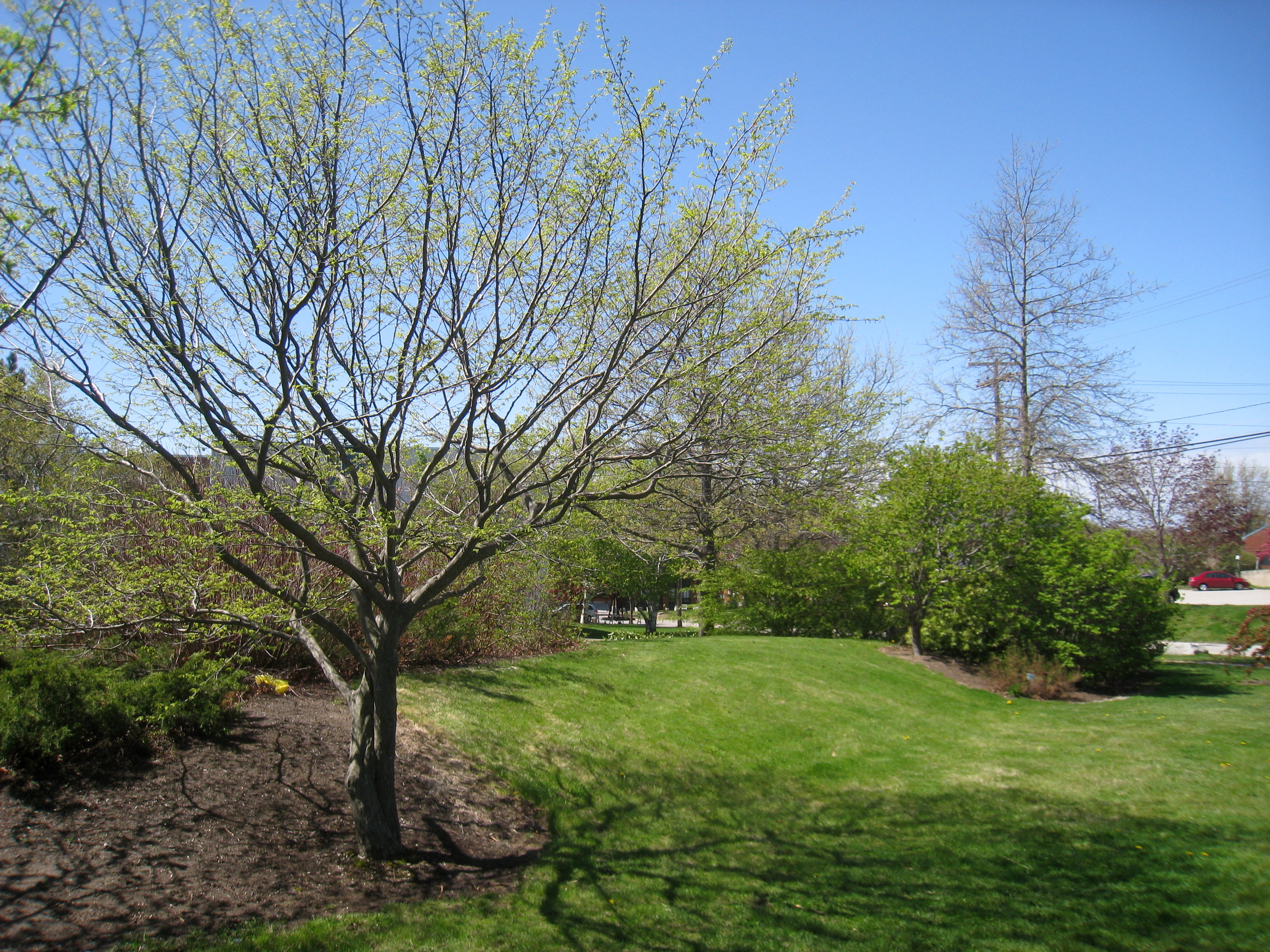
Shoreway Arboretum

The Southern Maine Community College campus also has an established arboretum which was created and is maintained by the college, named the Shoreway Arboretum. The arboretum runs along the shoreline of Willard Beach. The arboretum contains many kinds of native salt-tolerant trees and shrubs, including a good specimen of Swiss Stone Pine (Pinus cembra).

== Spring Point Shoreway ==
The Southern Maine Community College campus is situated within the Spring Point Shoreway. This shoreway comprises 21 scenic acres (85,000 m^{2}) and includes Willard Beach, Fort Preble, the Spring Point Ledge Light, and the Old Settler's Cemetery, and runs through the Shoreway Arboretum. The shoreway also includes the building which once housed the Portland Harbor Museum (now merged with the Maine Maritime Museum).

== Old Settlers Cemetery ==
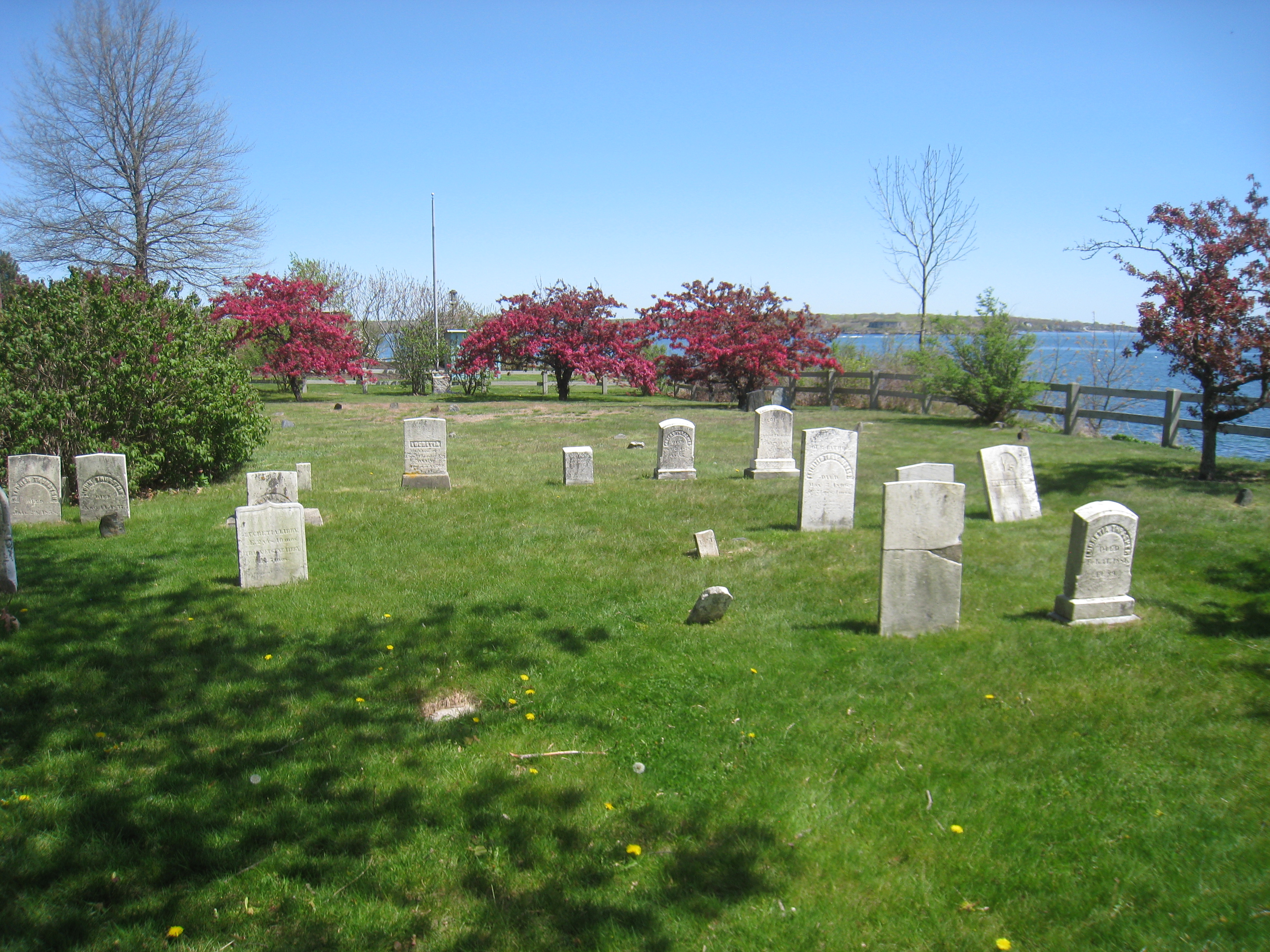
Old Settlers Cemetery

Also in the college's grounds is the Old Settlers Cemetery, which is South Portland's oldest landmark. It was established in 1658. It is also known as the Thrasher Cemetery.
