= York County Community College =

Public college in Wells, Maine, US

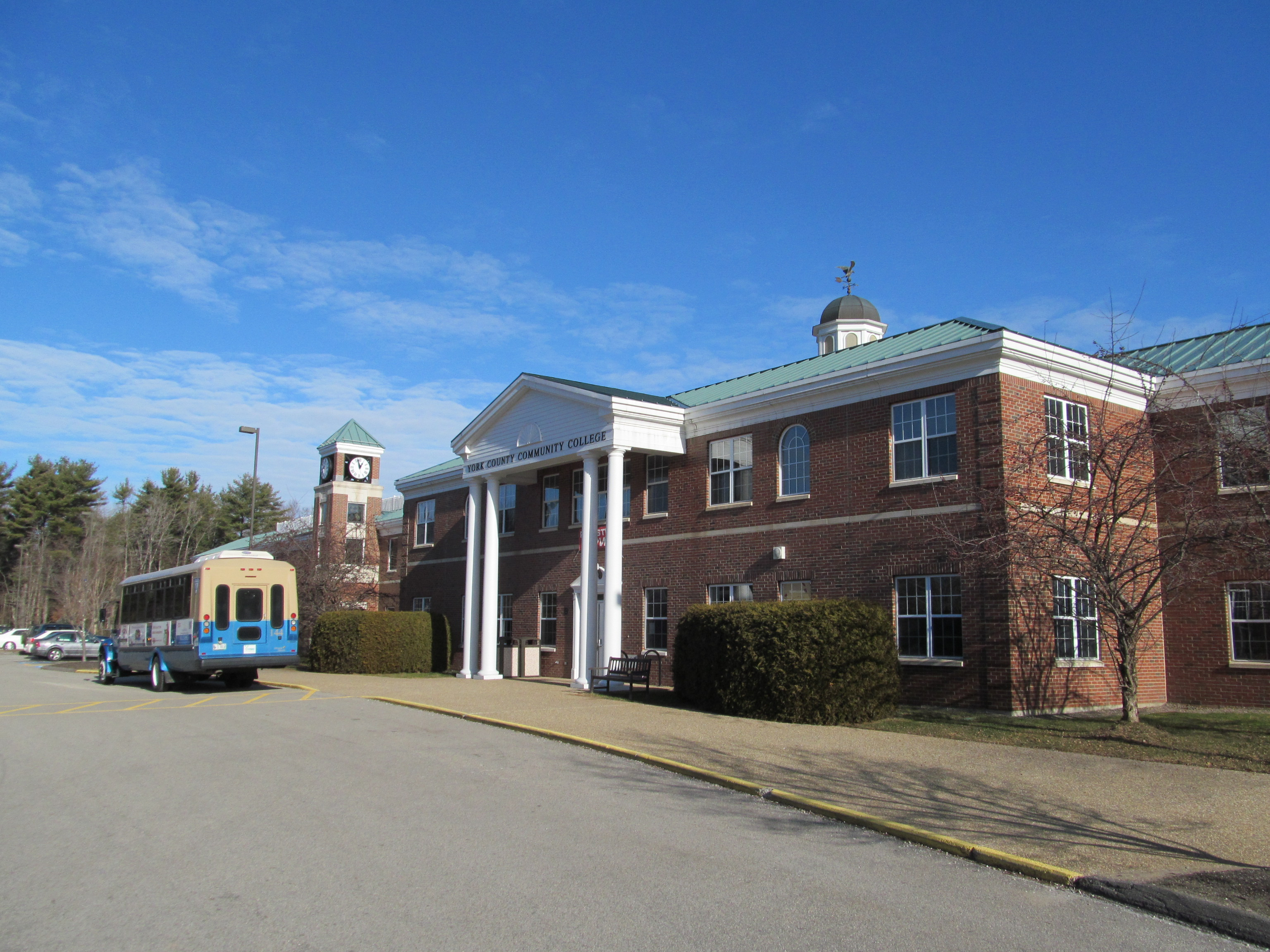
- York County Community College
- Former names: York County Technical College
- Motto: Find the Fearless You
- Type: Public community college
- Established: 1994; 32 years ago
- Parent institution: Maine Community College System
- Academic affiliations: Space-grant
- President: Michael Fischer
- Academic staff: 17 (FT) and 75 (adjunct)
- Students: 1,708 (Fall 2017)
- Location: Wells, Maine, U.S. 43°18′24″N 70°35′27″W
- Campus: Suburban
- Colors: Blue & white
- Nickname: York County Hawks
- Sporting affiliations: USCAA – YSCC, NACE
- Mascot: Hawk
- Website: www.yccc.edu

York County Community College (YCCC) is a public community college in Wells, Maine. YCCC is part of the Maine Community College System.

== History ==
York County Community College was established in 1994 as York County Technical College (YCTC) by the 116th Maine Legislature. In 1995, YCTC opened with an enrollment of 156 students as well as three associate degree programs and two certificate programs.

In December 1995, YCTC earned candidacy accreditation status from the New England Association of Schools and Colleges. Full accreditation status was obtained in 1999.

In November 1997, YCTC began classes in a new building. In later years, the building was expanded.

YCTC changed its name to York County Community College in July 2003.

In October 2020, the YCCC changed its mascot to the Hawk from the Coyote.

== Student body ==
As of the academic year 2022–2023, the enrollment was 1,625 students ranging from ages 17–72.

The number of full-time students were 399 (23.4%), and the number of part-time students were 1,309 (76.6%). The number of degree/certificate seeking students were 1,176 (68.9%) and the number of non-degree seeking students were 532 (31.1%).

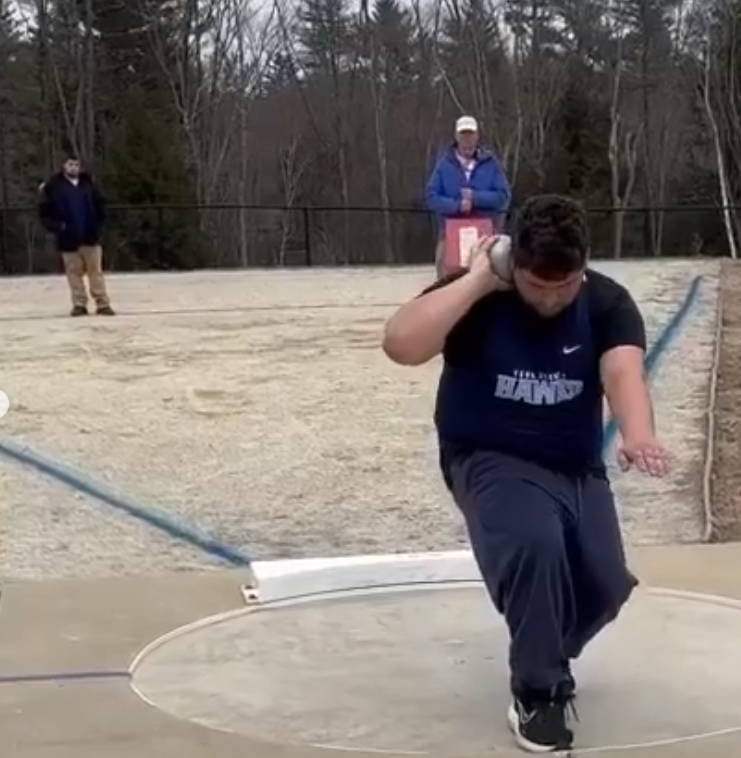
YCCC shotput

=== Demographics ===
As of the academic year 2022–23, the student population was 64% female and 36% male.

Population by Race/Ethnicity

- American Indian or Alaskan Native: 0.6%
- Asian: 1.7%
- Black or African-American: 2.2%
- Hispanic/Latino: 2.8%
- Native Hawaiian or other Pacific Islander: 0.2%
- White: 82.5%
- Two or more races: 2.8%
- Unknown: 4.7%

== Athletics ==
In 2021, the school began to offer athletics, including Track and Field, Esports and other activities for students to participate in.

=== Track and Field ===
In the USCAA's Yankee Small College Conference, the York County Community College Hawks are looked at as "an incredible threat". Many students from this team move on to NCAA schools that they often compete against in local competition given the school's community college status, such as Husson University.

=== Esports ===
York County Community College competed in NACE and presently competes in the ECAC. The program first started with an Overwatch team. This was later followed with some appearances at some Super Smash Brothers Ultimate tournaments and even hosting one of their own.
