= Kennebec Valley Community College =

Public college in Fairfield and Hinckley, Maine, US

- Type: Public community college
- Established: 1969; 57 years ago
- Parent institution: Maine Community College System
- President: Karen Normandin
- Location: Fairfield, Maine, U.S. 44°35′39″N 69°36′42″W
- Campus: 70 acres (28 ha); Rural
- Sporting affiliations: USCAA
- Website: www.kvcc.me.edu

Kennebec Valley Community College is a public community college in Fairfield and Hinckley, Maine. It is one of the seven colleges in the Maine Community College System.

== Overview ==
The college was organized in 1969 by the 104th Maine Legislature and its first classes began in fall 1970, with 35 full-time and 131 part-time students. Since then, it has undergone many changes and has grown to an enrollment of approximately 2,500 full and part-time students enrolled in credit courses for the fall semester in 2012. In addition, the college offers a comprehensive schedule of continuing education courses as well as business and industry outreach programs. The college is accredited by the New England Commission of Higher Education and offers more than 30 degree, diploma and certificate programs.

In 2021 the college held a virtual commencement for 482 students due to the COVID-19 pandemic.

In 2024 the college announced that in 2025 they would begin offering limited student housing at a nearby hotel.
