= Maine Community College System =

- Type: State community college system
- Established: 1946; 80 years ago
- President: David Daigler
- Students: 19,447
- Location: Maine, U.S.
- Colors: Blue; Green; White
- Website: mccs.me.edu

The Maine Community College System is Maine's comprehensive two-year college system, offering nearly 300 technical, career, and transfer programs; customized training; and lifelong learning. Maine's seven community colleges are located in Auburn, Bangor, Fairfield/Hinckley, Presque Isle, South Portland/Brunswick, Calais, and Wells.

MCCS awarded 2,766 credentials in 2014-15, a 62% increase over the 1,712 credentials awarded in 2003-04, the year Maine's technical colleges became community colleges. In fall 2015, 17,464 students enrolled in credit courses.

Maine Community College System Locations.

== Who the colleges serve ==
In fall 2015:

- 93% of incoming MCCS students are Maine residents.
- 40% come directly from high school.
- 34% enter with some prior college.
- 59% of all students attend part-time.
- 70% of students are enrolled in career and occupational programs in fall 2015. The number of those students has increased 40% since the transition to community colleges in 2003.
- 78% of full-time, degree seeking students receive financial aid.

== History and Mission ==
The history of Maine's community colleges began with the creation of the Maine Vocational Institute (MVI) in Augusta.

== Member Institutions ==
Institution	Location	Established	Enrollment (Fall 2024)	Nickname	Colors
Southern Maine Community College	South Portland and Brunswick	1946	7,900	SeaWolves	
Central Maine Community College	Auburn	1963	4,754	Mustangs	
Eastern Maine Community College	Bangor	1966	2,719	Golden Eagles	
Kennebec Valley Community College	Fairfield	1969	2,489	Lynxes	
York County Community College	Wells	1994	1,875	Hawks	
Northern Maine Community College	Presque Isle	1961	808	Falcons	
Washington County Community College	Calais	1969	805	Golden Eagles	
