= Central Maine Community College =

Community college in Auburn, Maine, U.S.

- Other name: CMCC
- Former names: Androscoggin State Vocational Institute, Central Maine Vocational Technical Institute, Central Maine Technical College
- Type: Public community college
- Established: 1963; 63 years ago (as Androscoggin State Vocational Institute); 1965; 61 years ago (as Central Maine Vocational Technical Institute); 1989; 37 years ago (as Central Maine Community College)
- Parent institution: Maine Community College System
- President: Betsy H. Libby
- Students: 3,376
- Location: Auburn, Maine, United States; 44°8′3″N 70°14′6″W
- Campus: 135 acres (55 ha); Suburban with Residence halls that house 253 students
- Sporting affiliations: USCAA – YSCC
- Mascot: Mustangs
- Website: www.cmcc.edu

Central Maine Community College (abbreviated CMCC) is a public community college in Auburn, Maine. It is part of the Maine Community College System.

In May 2026, CMCC celebrated its largest graduating class in school history, with 739 students receiving diplomas.

== Former names ==
Founded in 1963 as Androscoggin State Vocational Institute, later changed to Central Maine Vocational Technical Institute, in 1989 its name was changed to Central Maine Technical College. As part of a statewide name change of the technical college system on July 1, 2003, the school became Central Maine Community College.

== Accreditation ==
Central Maine Community College is accredited by the New England Association of Schools and Colleges.

== Student body ==
- Enrollment — approximately 3,376 students
- Student/faculty ratio is 18:1.
- 96% placement in jobs or education continuation

== Campus ==
Central Maine Community College's physical facilities were enlarged to keep pace with increased demand.

- 1967 - Addition completed to the original instructional facility. First residence hall constructed.
- 1969 - Extension of the North Wing completed. Entire instructional complex was designated by the State Board of Education as the Louis Jalbert Industrial Center, now Jalbert Hall.
- 1972 - Jalbert Hall South Wing was constructed in 1972 and expanded in 1979 and 1986.
- 1975 - Two apartment style dormitory buildings and the present dining room/kitchen facilities built.
- 1989 - A building to house the Culinary Arts program was completed. In November 1989 Maine voters authorized capital bonding for the 40,000 sq ft (3,700 m^{2})., Geneva A. Kirk Hall, which houses Nursing, Allied Health and Occupational Health and Safety programs; science laboratories; fitness and recreation facilities, gymnasium; and the Corporate and Community Services Division.
- 1993 - Kirk Hall dedicated for use on May 6, 1993.
- 1999 - Lapoint Center approved by voters.
- 2002 - Lapoint Center opens and includes classroom, office facilities, student use and library access.
- 2007 - Rancourt Hall, a co-ed residence hall, opens.
- 2019 - Addition of an esports arena as part of the new Esports Management program opening the same year.

== Off-campus sites ==
In addition to the main campus in Auburn, (Androscoggin County) Central Maine Community College also serves the educational needs of Franklin, Lincoln, and Oxford Counties.

== Housing ==
CMCC offers four residence halls to provide on-campus accommodations for 250 students. Student population is approximately 50% male and 50% female.

== Athletics ==
Full-time students have the opportunity to try out for intercollegiate sports. Central Maine Community College offers baseball and women's softball in the fall and men's and women's basketball in the winter. All of the teams participate in the USCAA. Any other intercollegiate sports or club sports are formed on a student interest basis.

=== Men's ===
- Baseball (fall and spring)
- Basketball (winter)
- Cross country (fall)
- Soccer (fall)
- Ice hockey

=== Women's ===
- Basketball (winter)
- Cross country (fall)
- Soccer (fall)
- Softball (fall and spring)
- Ice hockey
- Volleyball (fall)
