= University of Maine at Fort Kent =

Public college in Fort Kent, Maine, US

- Université du Maine à Fort-Kent
- Former names: Madawaska Training School (1878–1955); Fort Kent Normal School (1955–1961); Fort Kent State Teachers College (1961–1966); Fort Kent State College (1966–1971)
- Type: Public college
- Established: 1878; 148 years ago
- Parent institution: University of Maine System
- Chancellor: Dannel Malloy
- President: Deborah Hedeen
- Faculty: 75
- Students: 770 (fall 2024)
- Undergraduates: 672 (fall 2024)
- Postgraduates: 98 (fall 2024)
- Location: Fort Kent, Maine, United States; 47°15′0″N 68°35′15″W
- Campus: 54 acres (22 ha); Rural
- Colors: Green and gold
- Nickname: Bengals
- Sporting affiliations: USCAA
- Mascot: Bengal tiger
- Website: www.umfk.edu

The University of Maine at Fort Kent (UMaine Fort Kent or UMFK; French: Université du Maine à Fort-Kent) is a public college in Fort Kent, Maine, United States. It is the northernmost campus of the University of Maine System. It is an academic center for Acadian and French American culture and heritage, and French-speaking Mainers from throughout the state. It currently has an enrollment of 1,557 students.

It is classified among "Baccalaureate Colleges - General".

== History ==
On February 21, 1878, Governor Selden Connor signed an act establishing a teachers' school in the northern border region of the state, then known as the Madawaska territory, in an effort to Americanize the French settlers of the area. This became known as the Madawaska Training School. The institution held its first classes on September 30, 1878.

In 1955 the name was changed to Fort Kent Normal School to more precisely reflect its location. The name would change three more times, beginning in 1961 to become Fort Kent State Teachers College and then Fort Kent State College. The institution adopted its current name in 1970.

== Fiddlers Jamboree ==
UMFK hosts an annual Fiddlers Jamboree where fiddlers, guitarists, banjo pickers, drummers and accordion players from both Canada and the United States perform.

== Academics ==
Undergraduate demographics as of Fall 2023
Race and ethnicity	Total
White	67%
International student	11%
Black	8%
Two or more races	5%
Hispanic	4%
Unknown	3%
American Indian/Alaska Native	1%
Asian	1%
Economic diversity
Low-income (Note: The percentage of students who received an income-based federal Pell grant intended for low-income students.)	26%
Affluent (Note: The percentage of students who are a part of the American middle class at the bare minimum.)	74%

The college offers several academic programs including 4 Associate of Science degrees, 1 Bachelor of Arts, and 14 Bachelor of Science degrees.

== Acadian Archives/Archives acadiennes ==
The Acadian Archives/Archives acadiennes are located at the University of Maine at Fort Kent. The Archives secured state funding in 1989 and officially opened the following year. They are entrusted with providing representation to a culture that is distinct from Franco-American communities in other areas of Maine. In 2004, during the tenure of Lisa Ornstein, the founding director, the Archives moved to larger premises on the UMFK campus. This is the only research center dedicated specifically to the Acadian story in the U.S. Northeast.

The Archives document the language, culture, and history of the borderland communities of the Upper St. John Valley as well as a larger, transnational Acadian story. Collections include an array of English- and French-language manuscript materials kept in a climate-controlled space: rare newspapers like the Journal du Madawaska, nineteenth-century maps, scrapbooks, the ledgers and corporate documents of local businesses, songbooks, diaries, and more than 20,000 photographs. The oldest item is a seventeenth-century commission awarded to Charles de Saint-Etienne de la Tour for the colonization of Acadia by Louis XIV. The Archives are also a genealogical research center.

== Athletics ==
The Maine–Fort Kent (UMFK) athletic teams are called the Bengals. The college is a member of the United States Collegiate Athletic Association (USCAA), primarily competing as an Independent since the 2011–12 academic year. The Bengals previously participated in the Sunrise Athletic Conference of the National Association of Intercollegiate Athletics (NAIA) from 2002–03 to 2010–11.

UMFK competes in seven intercollegiate varsity sports: Men's sports include basketball, soccer and track & field; while women's sports include basketball, soccer, track & field and volleyball. UMFK also has a number of intramural teams.

=== Soccer ===
The varsity men's soccer team won the USCAA National Championship in 2010 and 2015. It was runner up at the 2013 and 2014 tournaments. The varsity "Lady Bengals" women's soccer team won the USCAA National Championship in 2010 and 2011, and then every year from 2013 to 2017, and again in 2019.

=== Biathlon ===
In 2002, UMFK signed an agreement with the United States Biathlon Association allowing the USBA to nominate up to five biathletes for a UMFK scholarship program which allows them to attend the university at the Maine in-state tuition rate and gives them access to the university's training facilities. The agreement was also aimed at training possible Olympic contestants at the university.

UMFK also assists with the organization of Biathlon events hosted at the nearby 10th Mountain Ski Center such as the 2005, and the 2009 IBU Biathlon World Cup.

== International collaboration ==
The university is an active member of the University of the Arctic. UArctic is an international cooperative network based in the Circumpolar Arctic region, consisting of more than 200 universities, colleges, and other organizations with an interest in promoting education and research in the Arctic region.

== Notable people ==
=== Alumni ===
- Kimika Forbes (2014), goalkeeper for Trinidad and Tobago women's national football team
- Helen Hamlin (1937), author of two books on northern Maine
- Troy Jackson (1990), United States Senator-elect, former president of the Maine Senate

== See also ==
- University of Maine System
- Fort Kent, Maine
