= United States Collegiate Athletic Association =

National organization for intercollegiate athletic programs

- Abbreviation: USCAA
- Formation: 1966; 60 years ago
- Type: Association
- Headquarters: Pittsburgh, Pennsylvania, U.S.
- Region served: United States
- Members: 80 institutions (24 states)
- Chief Operating Officer: Barbara J. Bertges
- Main organ: Governing body
- Website: theuscaa.com

The United States Collegiate Athletic Association (USCAA) is a national organization for the intercollegiate athletic programs of 72 mostly small colleges, including community/junior colleges, across the United States. The USCAA holds 15 national championships and 2 national invitationals annually.

== History ==
In 1966 (60 years ago), the USCAA was founded as the National Little College Athletic Association (NLCAA), primarily to sponsor a national basketball tournament for small colleges and junior colleges.

In the 1970s and through the 1980s, as the NLCAA, the USCAA began adding more sports.

In 1989, the NLCAA changed its name to the National Small College Athletic Association (NSCAA).

In 2001, the USCAA adopted its current name.

== Sports ==
Postseason national championships are held in all sports except football, which has few participating teams.

The USCAA sanctions competition in eight men's and seven women's sports:

=== Fall ===
- Men's football
- Men's and women's golf
- Men's and women's cross country running
- Men's and women's soccer (Division I and II)
- Women's volleyball (Division I and II)

=== Winter ===
- Men's and women's indoor track and field
- Men's and women's basketball (Division I and II)
- Men's wrestling

=== Spring ===
- Men's and women's track and field
- Men's baseball
- Women's softball

== Conferences ==
- Eastern States Athletic Conference
  - USCAA Division II
- Penn State University Athletic Conference
  - USCAA Division II
- Yankee Small College Conference
  - USCAA Division II
- North American Conference
  - USCAA Division I

=== Former conferences ===
- Eastern Metro Athletic Conference
- Ohio Collegiate Athletic Conference
- Hudson Valley Intercollegiate Athletic Conference

== Champions ==
=== Men's cross country ===
- 1971 Albany College of Pharmacy (NY)
- 1972 Albany College of Pharmacy (NY)
- 1973 Brewer State College (AL)
- 1974 University of South Carolina-Spartanburg
- 1975 Ambassador College (TX)
- 1976 Ambassador College (TX)
- 1977 Florida College
- 1978 Florida College
- 1979 Dr. Martin Luther College (MN)
- 1980 (Not available)
- 1981 Southern Union College
- 1982 Southern Union College
- 1983–1993 (Not available)
- 1994 Diné College
- 1995 Diné College
- 1996 Unity College (ME)
- 1997–1999 (Not available)
- 2000 Diné College
- 2001–2003 (Not available)
- 2004 Principia College
- 2005 Diné College
- 2006 Diné College
- 2007 Diné College
- 2008 Diné College
- 2009 Diné College
- 2010 Spalding University
- 2011 SUNY ESF
- 2012 SUNY ESF
- 2013 SUNY ESF
- 2014 SUNY ESF
- 2015 Berea College
- 2016 SUNY Delhi
- 2017 SUNY Delhi
- 2018 SUNY Delhi
- 2019 SUNY Delhi
- 2020 No tournament
- 2021 SUNY ESF
- 2022 SUNY ESF
- 2023 SUNY ESF
- 2024 SUNY ESF
- 2025 SUNY ESF

=== Women's cross country ===
- 1981 Brewer State College (AL)
- 1982 Alice Lloyd College (KY)
- 1983–1994 (Not available)
- 1995 Diné College (AZ)
- 1996 Unity College (ME)
- 1997 (Not available)
- 1998 Southern Virginia University
- 1999 (Not available)
- 2000 Warren Wilson College
- 2001 Southern Virginia University
- 2002 Southern Virginia University
- 2003 Southern Virginia University
- 2004 Southern Virginia University
- 2005 Southern Virginia University
- 2006 Southern Virginia University
- 2007 Southern Virginia University
- 2008 Diné College
- 2009 Saint Mary-of-the-Woods College
- 2010 Saint Mary-of-the-Woods College
- 2011 Southern Virginia University
- 2012 Southern Virginia University
- 2013 Daemen College
- 2014 Diné College
- 2015 Berea College
- 2016 Cleary University
- 2017 Cleary University
- 2018 SUNY ESF
- 2019 Saint Mary-of-the-Woods College
- 2020 No tournament
- 2021 SUNY ESF
- 2022 SUNY ESF
- 2023 SUNY ESF
- 2024 SUNY ESF
- 2025 SUNY ESF

=== Men's track and field ===
- 2022 University of Maine at Fort Kent
- 2023 Bluefield State University
- 2024 Albany College of Pharmacy and Health Sciences
- 2025 SUNY ESF

=== Women's track and field ===
- 2022 University of Maine at Fort Kent
- 2023 Bluefield State University
- 2024 SUNY ESF
- 2025 SUNY ESF

=== Men's soccer ===
- 1977 St. Paul Bible College
- 1978 St. Paul Bible College
- 1979 St. Paul Bible College
- 1980 Mount Senario College (WI)
- 1981 Concordia College (MN)
- 1982 Blackburn College (IL)
- 1983 Cardinal Newman College (MO)
- 1984 Blackburn College
- 1985 Marycrest College (IA)
- 1986 Fontbonne College (MO)
- 1987 Central Christian College (KS)
- 1988 St. Scholastica College (MN)
- 1989 St. Scholastica College (MN)
- 1990 York College (NE)
- 1991 Northland College (WI)
- 1992 York College
- 1993 Martin Methodist College
- 1994 Sue Bennett College (KY)
- 1995 Centenary College of New Jersey
- 1996 Michigan Christian College
- 1997 Kansas Wesleyan University
- 1998 Kansas Wesleyan University
- 1999 Kansas Wesleyan University
- 2000 Southern Virginia University
- 2001 Southern Virginia University
- 2002 University of Dallas
- 2003 UT Tyler
- 2004 Robert Morris University Illinois – Lake County
- 2005 Bluefield College
- 2006 Rochester College
- 2007 Robert Morris University Illinois – Lake County
- 2008 Briarcliffe College
- 2009 Concordia College – Selma, Alabama
- 2010 University of Maine at Fort Kent
- 2011 Lindenwood University – Belleville
- 2012 Briarcliffe College
- 2013 West Virginia University Institute of Technology
- 2014 West Virginia University Institute of Technology
- 2015 University of Maine Fort Kent
- 2016 University of Maine Fort Kent
- 2017 Florida National University

=== Men's Division I soccer ===
- 2018 Florida National University
- 2019 Bryant & Stratton College Syracuse
- 2020 No tournament
- 2021 Bryant & Stratton College Syracuse
- 2022 University of Maine Fort Kent
- 2023 Bryant & Stratton College Rochester
- 2024 Lyon College
- 2025 Salem University

=== Men's Division II soccer ===
- 2018 Penn State Brandywine
- 2019 Berkeley College (NY)
- 2020 No tournament
- 2021 Penn State Brandywine
- 2022 Johnson & Wales University (NC)
- 2023 Johnson & Wales University (NC)
- 2024 Central Maine Community College
- 2025 Central Maine Community College

=== Women's soccer ===
- 1997 St. Gregory's University (OK)
- 1998 Southern Virginia College
- 1999 Southern Virginia College
- 2000 Huntingdon College (OR)
- 2001 University of Dallas
- 2002 University of Dallas
- 2003 University of Dallas
- 2004 Webber International University
- 2005 Southern Virginia University
- 2006 Southern Virginia University
- 2007 Robert Morris – Springfield
- 2008 Southern Virginia University
- 2009 Marygrove College
- 2010 University of Maine at Fort Kent
- 2011 University of Maine at Fort Kent
- 2012 Daemen College
- 2013 University of Maine Fort Kent
- 2014 University of Maine Fort Kent
- 2015 University of Maine Fort Kent
- 2016 University of Maine Fort Kent
- 2017 University of Maine Fort Kent

=== Women's Division I soccer ===
- 2018 Cleary University
- 2019 University of Maine Fort Kent
- 2020 No tournament
- 2021 Bryant & Stratton College Syracuse
- 2022 University of Maine Fort Kent
- 2023 Shaw University
- 2024 Shaw University
- 2025 Virginia State University

=== Women's Division II soccer ===
- 2018 University of Cincinnati Clermont College (UC Clermont)
- 2019 UC Clermont
- 2020 No tournament
- 2021 SUNY ESF
- 2022 Albany College of Pharmacy and Health Sciences
- 2023 UC Clermont
- 2024 UC Clermont
- 2025 UC Clermont

=== Women's volleyball ===
- 1980 Jackson Baptist College (OR)
- 1981 (not available)
- 1982 Northland College (WI)
- 1983 College of St. Scholastica (MN)
- 1984 College of St. Scholastica
- 1985 Dr. Martin Luther College
- 1986 Dr. Martin Luther College
- 1987 Dr. Martin Luther College
- 1988 College of St. Scholastica
- 1989 Northland College
- 1990 Nazareth College (MI)
- 1991 Concordia College St. Paul (MN)
- 1992 Northland College
- 1993 Concordia College Seward (NE)
- 1994 (Not available)
- 1995 Kansas Wesleyan University
- 1996 Kansas Wesleyan University
- 1997 Kansas Wesleyan University
- 1998 Rochester College
- 1999 Rochester College
- 2000 Florida College
- 2001 University of Dallas
- 2002 Southern Virginia University
- 2003 Florida College
- 2004 Southern Virginia University
- 2005 Florida College
- 2006 Florida College
- 2007 Florida College
- 2008 Spalding University
- 2009 Florida College
- 2010 Florida College
- 2011 Florida College
- 2012 Daemen College
- 2013 Daemen College
- 2014 Florida College
- 2015 Florida College
- 2016 Florida College
- 2017 Florida College

=== Women's Division I volleyball ===
- 2018 Florida National University
- 2019 Florida National University
- 2020 No tournament
- 2021 Saint Mary-of-the-Woods College
- 2022 Bluefield State University
- 2023 University of Maine at Fort Kent
- 2024 Shaw University
- 2025 Paul Quinn College

=== Women's Division II volleyball ===
- 2018 Johnson & Wales University (NC)
- 2019 Penn State Fayette
- 2020 No tournament
- 2021 UC Clermont
- 2022 Penn State Mont Alto
- 2023 Penn State Mont Alto
- 2024 Kent State University Tuscawaras
- 2025 UC Clermont

=== Men's basketball ===
- 1967 Sullivan Business College
- 1968 Sullivan Business College
- 1969 Sullivan Business College
- 1970 Kittrell College (NC)
- 1971 Tiffin University (OH)
- 1972 Lindsey Wilson College (KY)
- 1973 Tiffin University
- 1974 Bryant & Stratton Institute
- 1975 Florida College
- 1976 Northeast Technical College (NE)
- 1977 Rust College (MS)
- 1978 Southern Union (AL)
- 1979 Florida College
- 1980 Sullivan Junior College (formerly Sullivan Business College)
- 1981 Oakland City College (IN)
- 1982 Blackburn College (IL)
- 1983 Concordia College (TX)
- 1984 Webber College
- 1985 Blackburn College (IL)
- 1986 Bristol College
- 1987 National College of Business (SD)
- 1988 National College
- 1989 Michigan Christian College
- 1990 Paul Quinn College (TX)
- 1991 Mount Senario College (WI)
- 1992 Texas College
- 1993 Texas College
- 1994 Mount Senario College
- 1995 Paul Quinn College
- 1996 Mount Senario College
- 1997 Louisiana College
- 1998 Northwest Christian College
- 1999 Northwest Christian College
- 2000 Kansas Wesleyan University

=== Division I men's basketball ===
- 2001 Finlandia University (MI)
- 2002 The Apprentice School
- 2003 The Apprentice School
- 2004 Rochester College
- 2005 Rochester College
- 2006 Rhema Bible Training Center
- 2007 Rhema Bible Training Center
- 2008 Oakwood University
- 2009 Talladega College
- 2010 Talladega College
- 2011 Southern Virginia University
- 2012 Oakwood University
- 2013 Rochester College
- 2014 Washington Adventist University
- 2015 Daemen College
- 2016 Oakwood University
- 2017 Concordia College (AL)
- 2018 Rochester College
- 2019 Oakwood University
- 2020 No tournament
- 2021 No tournament
- 2022 Paul Quinn College
- 2023 Salem University
- 2024 The Apprentice School
- 2025 The Apprentice School
- 2026 North American University

=== Men's Division II basketball ===
- 2001 Huntingdon College (AL)
- 2002 Central Maine Community College
- 2003 Johnson & Wales University (FL)
- 2004 Arkansas Baptist College
- 2005 New Hampshire Technical Institute
- 2006 Taylor University, Ft. Wayne
- 2007 University of Cincinnati Clermont College
- 2008 Williamson Trade College
- 2009 Williamson Trade College
- 2010 Valor Christian College
- 2011 Andrews University
- 2012 Andrews University
- 2013 Warren Wilson College
- 2014 Andrews University
- 2015 Berkeley College (NY)
- 2016 Berkeley College (NY)
- 2017 Berkeley College (NY)
- 2018 Berkeley College (NY)
- 2019 Penn State Wilkes-Barre
- 2020 NHTI, Concord's Community College
- 2021 No tournament
- 2022 Southern Maine Community College
- 2023 Penn State Wilkes-Barre
- 2024 Penn State Wilkes-Barre
- 2025 Miami Hamilton
- 2026 Penn State York

=== Women's basketball ===
- 1980 Colorado Women's College
- 1981 No tournament
- 1982 National (SD)
- 1983 Concordia St. Paul (MN)
- 1984 Lamar Community College
- 1985 Phillips Junior College–Gulfport
- 1986 Phillips Junior College–Gulfport
- 1987 Concordia (NE)
- 1988 College of St. Scholastica (MN)
- 1989 Concordia (NE)
- 1990 Concordia (NE)
- 1991 Silver Lake College (WI)
- 1992 Trinity International University (IL)
- 1993 Blackburn College (IL)
- 1994 Trinity International
- 1995 Martin Methodist College
- 1996 Kansas Wesleyan University
- 1997 Kansas Wesleyan University
- 1998 Clarendon College
- 1999 Kansas Wesleyan University
- 2000 Southern Virginia University
- 2001 The Apprentice School
- 2002 The Apprentice School
- 2003 Mount Aloysius (PA)
- 2004 Presentation College (SD)
- 2005 Southern Virginia University
- 2006 Southern Virginia University
- 2007 Concordia College – Selma
- 2008 Concordia College – Selma
- 2009 Spalding University
- 2010 Talladega College
- 2011 Ave Maria University
- 2012 Concordia College – Selma

=== Women's Division I basketball ===
- 2013 Daemen College
- 2014 Concordia College Alabama
- 2015 Daemen College
- 2016 Concordia College Alabama
- 2017 Concordia College Alabama
- 2018 Rochester College
- 2019 Mississippi University for Women
- 2020 Tournament canceled
- 2021 No tournament
- 2022 D'Youville University
- 2023 D'Youville University
- 2024 Salem University
- 2025 North American University
- 2026 Bloomfield College

=== Women's Division II basketball ===
- 2013 Albany College of Pharmacy
- 2014 University of Cincinnati Clermont College
- 2015 Penn State Beaver
- 2016 College of St. Joseph
- 2017 Central Maine Community College
- 2018 Johnson & Wales University (NC)
- 2019 Central Maine Community College
- 2020 Penn State Beaver
- 2021 No tournament
- 2022 Central Maine Community College
- 2023 UC Clermont
- 2024 Christendom College
- 2025 Christendom College
- 2026 Central Maine Community College

=== Baseball ===
- 1975 Colorado Northwestern Community College
- 1976 Colorado Northwestern Community College
- 1977 Colorado Northwestern Community College
- 1978 Missouri Baptist College
- 1979 Colorado Northwestern Community College
- 1980 Colorado Northwestern Community College
- 1981 Colorado Northwestern Community College
- 1982 Alabama Christian College
- 1983 Lamar College
- 1984 Lamar College
- 1985 Colorado Northwestern Community College
- 1986 Colorado Northwestern Community College
- 1987 No tournament
- 1988 Kansas Wesleyan University
- 1989 (Not available)
- 1990 Bristol University
- 1991–1994 (Not available)
- 1995 (Not available)
- 1996 Baptist Christian College
- 1997 Kansas Wesleyan University
- 1998 No tournament
- 1999 Kansas Wesleyan University
- 2000 Huntingdon College (AL)
- 2001 (Not available)
- 2002 Florida College
- 2003 LaGrange College (GA)
- 2004 Florida College
- 2005 Webber International University
- 2006 Briarcliffe College
- 2007 The Apprentice School
- 2008 Columbia Union College
- 2009 Saint Catharine College
- 2010 Briarcliffe College
- 2011 Briarcliffe College
- 2012 Spalding University
- 2013 University of Cincinnati Clermont College
- 2014 Lindenwood University – Belleville
- 2015 The Apprentice School
- 2016 College of St. Joseph
- 2017 College of St. Joseph
- 2018 Penn State DuBois
- 2019 Penn State DuBois
- 2020 Tournament canceled
- 2021 Penn State DuBois
- 2022 The Apprentice School
- 2023 Penn State DuBois
- 2024 UC Clermont
- 2025 Salem University
- 2026 The Apprentice School

=== Men's golf ===
- 1972 University of South Carolina Aiken
- 1973 Steed College (TN)
- 1974 University of South Carolina Spartanburg
- 1975 University of South Carolina Aiken
- 1976 University of South Carolina Aiken
- 1977 Ambassador College (TX)
- 1978 Southern Union College (AL)
- 1979 Florida College
- 1980 Brewer State College (AL)
- 1981–2000 (Not available)
- 2001–2002 No tournament
- 2003 LaGrange College
- 2004 Keystone College
- 2005 The Apprentice School
- 2006 The Apprentice School
- 2007 Rhema Bible College
- 2008 Pennsylvania College of Technology
- 2009 Rochester College
- 2010 Rochester College
- 2011 Lindenwood University – Belleville
- 2012 Daemen College
- 2013 Daemen College
- 2014 Daemen College
- 2015 Cleary University
- 2016 Bluefield State College
- 2017 SUNY Delhi
- 2018 Saint Mary-of-the-Woods College
- 2019 Saint Mary-of-the-Woods College
- 2020 SUNY Delhi (spring 2021)
- 2021 Bluefield State College
- 2022 Johnson & Wales University (NC)
- 2023 Lyon College
- 2024 Lyon College
- 2025 Southern Maine Community College

=== Softball ===
- 1991 Lake Erie College (OH)
- 1992–1996 (Not available)
- 1997 Saint Mary-of-the-Woods College (IN)
- 1998 No tournament
- 1999 Southern Virginia College
- 2000 Saint Mary-of-the-Woods College
- 2001 (Not available)
- 2002 Saint Mary-of-the-Woods College
- 2003 Saint Mary-of-the-Woods College
- 2004 Saint Mary-of-the-Woods College
- 2005 Saint Mary-of-the-Woods College
- 2006 Robert Morris – Springfield
- 2007 Saint Mary-of-the-Woods College
- 2008 Saint Mary-of-the-Woods College
- 2009 Saint Catharine College
- 2010 Robert Morris–Springfield
- 2011 Rochester College
- 2012 Spalding University
- 2013 Lindenwood University – Belleville
- 2014 Lindenwood University – Belleville
- 2015 Saint Mary-of-the-Woods College
- 2016 Saint Mary-of-the-Woods College
- 2017 Saint Mary-of-the-Woods College
- 2018 Cleary University
- 2019 Saint Mary-of-the-Woods College
- 2020 Tournament canceled
- 2021 Florida National University
- 2022 Florida National University
- 2023 Penn State Brandywine
- 2024 Penn State Brandywine
- 2025 Southern Maine Community College
- 2026 Salem University

== See also ==
- List of USCAA institutions
