= List of college athletic programs by U.S. state =

The main article of this list is College athletics in the United States.

== U.S. States ==
- List of college athletic programs in Alabama
- List of college athletic programs in Alaska
- List of college athletic programs in Arizona
- List of college athletic programs in Arkansas
- List of college athletic programs in California
- List of college athletic programs in Colorado
- List of college athletic programs in Connecticut
- List of college athletic programs in Delaware
- List of college athletic programs in Florida
- List of college athletic programs in Georgia
- List of college athletic programs in Hawaii
- List of college athletic programs in Idaho
- List of college athletic programs in Illinois
- List of college athletic programs in Indiana
- List of college athletic programs in Iowa
- List of college athletic programs in Kansas
- List of college athletic programs in Kentucky
- List of college athletic programs in Louisiana
- List of college athletic programs in Maine
- List of college athletic programs in Maryland
- List of college athletic programs in Massachusetts
- List of college athletic programs in Michigan
- List of college athletic programs in Minnesota
- List of college athletic programs in Mississippi
- List of college athletic programs in Missouri
- List of college athletic programs in Montana
- List of college athletic programs in Nebraska
- List of college athletic programs in Nevada
- List of college athletic programs in New Hampshire
- List of college athletic programs in New Jersey
- List of college athletic programs in New Mexico
- List of college athletic programs in New York
- List of college athletic programs in North Carolina
- List of college athletic programs in North Dakota
- List of college athletic programs in Ohio
- List of college athletic programs in Oklahoma
- List of college athletic programs in Oregon
- List of college athletic programs in Pennsylvania
- List of college athletic programs in Rhode Island
- List of college athletic programs in South Carolina
- List of college athletic programs in South Dakota
- List of college athletic programs in Tennessee
- List of college athletic programs in Texas
- List of college athletic programs in Utah
- List of college athletic programs in Vermont
- List of college athletic programs in Virginia
- List of college athletic programs in Washington
- List of college athletic programs in West Virginia
- List of college athletic programs in Wisconsin
- List of college athletic programs in Wyoming

== See also ==
- List of college athletic programs in Washington, D.C.
- List of college athletic programs in Puerto Rico

== Canada ==
=== NCAA Division II ===
Simon Fraser Red Leafs	Simon Fraser University	Burnaby, British Columbia	Great Northwest Athletic Conference

=== NAIA (Note: All universities listed are also members of Canadian Interuniversity Sport, and those conferences are listed after each university's NAIA status.) ===
British Columbia Thunderbirds	University of British Columbia	Vancouver, British Columbia	Independent, Canada West-Pacific Division
Trinity Western Spartans	Trinity Western University	Langley, British Columbia	Independent, Canada West-Pacific Division
Victoria Vikes	University of Victoria	Victoria, British Columbia	Independent, Canada West-Pacific Division

== See also ==
- List of NCAA Division I athletic directors
- List of NCAA Division I institutions
- List of NCAA Division II institutions
- List of NCAA Division III institutions
- List of NAIA institutions
- List of NJCAA Division I schools
- List of NJCAA Division II schools
- List of NJCAA Division III schools
- List of USCAA institutions
- List of NCCAA institutions
