= List of college athletic programs in Montana =

This is a list of college athletic programs in the U.S. state of Montana.

== NCAA ==
=== Division I ===
Full NCAA Division I member colleges in Montana

Team	School	City	Conference	Sport sponsorship								
Team	School	City	Conference	Foot- ball	Basketball		Base- ball	Soft- ball	Ice Hockey		Soccer	
Team	School	City	Conference	Foot- ball	M	W	Base- ball	Soft- ball	M	W	M	W
Montana Grizzlies (Note: The women's basketball team is known as the "Lady Griz," but all other women's teams use the "Grizzlies" nickname.)	University of Montana	Missoula	Big Sky	FCS	Yes	Yes	No	Yes	No	No	No	Yes
Montana State Bobcats	Montana State University	Bozeman	Big Sky	FCS	Yes	Yes	No	No	No	No	No	No

=== Division II ===
Full NCAA Division II member colleges in Montana

Team	School	City	Conference	Sport sponsorship							
Team	School	City	Conference	Basketball		Base- ball	Soft- ball	Ice Hockey		Soccer	
Team	School	City	Conference	M	W	Base- ball	Soft- ball	M	W	M	W
MSU Billings Yellowjackets	Montana State University Billings	Billings	Great Northwest	Yes	Yes	Yes	Yes	No	No	No	Yes

== NAIA ==
NAIA member colleges in Montana

Team	School	City	Conference	Sport sponsorship						
Team	School	City	Conference	Foot- ball	Basketball		Base- ball	Soft- ball	Soccer	
Team	School	City	Conference	Foot- ball	M	W	Base- ball	Soft- ball	M	W
Carroll Fighting Saints	Carroll College	Helena	Frontier	Yes	Yes	Yes	No	Yes (Note: All Frontier Conference schools that sponsor softball or soccer compete in the Cascade Collegiate Conference for those sports.)	Yes	Yes
Providence Argonauts	University of Providence	Great Falls	Frontier	No	Yes	Yes	No	Yes	Yes	Yes
Montana Western Bulldogs	University of Montana Western	Dillon	Frontier	Yes	Yes	Yes	No	No	No	No
MSU–Northern Lights	Montana State University–Northern	Havre	Frontier	Yes	Yes	Yes	No	No	No	No
Montana Tech Orediggers	Montana Technological University	Butte	Frontier	Yes	Yes	Yes	No	No	No	No
Rocky Mountain Battlin' Bears	Rocky Mountain College	Billings	Frontier	Yes	Yes	Yes	No	No	Yes	Yes

== NJCAA ==
Team	School	City	Conference
Dawson Buccaneers	Dawson Community College	Glendive	Mon-Dak
Little Big Horn Rams	Little Big Horn College	Crow Agency	Independent
Miles Pioneers	Miles Community College	Miles City	Independent

== See also ==
- List of NCAA Division I institutions
- List of NCAA Division II institutions
- List of NCAA Division III institutions
- List of NAIA institutions
- List of USCAA institutions
- List of NCCAA institutions
- List of NJCAA Division I institutions
- List of NJCAA Division II institutions
- List of NJCAA Division III institutions
