= List of college athletic programs in Idaho =

College athletic programs in Idaho, list

This is a list of college athletic programs in the U.S. state of Idaho.

== NCAA ==
=== Division I ===
Full NCAA Division I member colleges in Idaho.
– FBS Football, – FCS Football

Team	School	City	Conference	Sport sponsorship						
Team	School	City	Conference	Foot- ball	Basketball		Base- ball	Soft- ball	Soccer	
Team	School	City	Conference	Foot- ball	M	W	Base- ball	Soft- ball	M	W
Boise State Broncos	Boise State University	Boise	Mountain West	FBS	Yes	Yes	No	Yes	No	Yes
Idaho Vandals	University of Idaho	Moscow	Big Sky	FCS	Yes	Yes	No	No	No	Yes
Idaho State Bengals	Idaho State University	Pocatello	Big Sky	FCS	Yes	Yes	No	Yes	No	Yes

=== Division II ===
Full NCAA Division II member colleges in Idaho.
– Non-Football

Team	School	City	Conference	Sport sponsorship					
Team	School	City	Conference	Basketball		Base- ball	Soft- ball	Soccer	
Team	School	City	Conference	M	W	Base- ball	Soft- ball	M	W
Northwest Nazarene Nighthawks	Northwest Nazarene University	Nampa	Great Northwest	Yes	Yes	Yes	Yes	Yes	Yes

== NAIA ==
Full NAIA member colleges in Idaho.
– Football, – Non-Football

Team	School	City	Conference	Sport sponsorship						
Team	School	City	Conference	Foot- ball	Basketball		Base- ball	Soft- ball	Soccer	
Team	School	City	Conference	Foot- ball	M	W	Base- ball	Soft- ball	M	W
College of Idaho Coyotes	College of Idaho	Caldwell	Cascade	Yes (Note: The College of Idaho's football team competes in the Frontier Conference.)	Yes	Yes	Yes	Yes	Yes	Yes
Lewis–Clark State Warriors	Lewis–Clark State College	Lewiston	Cascade	No	Yes	Yes	Yes	No	No	No

== NJCAA ==
Full NJCAA member colleges in Idaho.
– Non-Football

Team	School	City	Conference
North Idaho Cardinals	North Idaho College	Coeur d'Alene	Northwest
Southern Idaho Golden Eagles	College of Southern Idaho	Twin Falls	Scenic West

== See also ==
- List of NCAA Division I institutions
- List of NCAA Division II institutions
- List of NCAA Division III institutions
- List of NAIA institutions
- List of USCAA institutions
- List of NCCAA institutions
- List of NJCAA Division I institutions
- List of NJCAA Division II institutions
- List of NJCAA Division III institutions
