= List of college athletic programs in West Virginia =

This is a list of college athletic programs in the U.S. state of West Virginia.

== NCAA ==
=== Division I ===
Full NCAA Division I member colleges in West Virginia.

Team	School	City	Conference	Sport sponsorship								
Team	School	City	Conference	Foot- ball	Basketball		Base- ball	Soft- ball	Ice Hockey		Soccer	
Team	School	City	Conference	Foot- ball	M	W	Base- ball	Soft- ball	M	W	M	W
Marshall Thundering Herd	Marshall University	Huntington	Sun Belt	FBS	Yes	Yes	Yes	Yes	No	No	Yes	Yes
West Virginia Mountaineers	West Virginia University	Morgantown	Big 12	FBS	Yes	Yes	Yes	No	No	No	Yes (Note: West Virginia's men's soccer team competes in the Sun Belt Conference.)	Yes

=== Division II ===
Full NCAA Division II member colleges in West Virginia.
– Football member, – Non-football member

Team	School	City	Conference	Sport sponsorship								
Team	School	City	Conference	Foot- ball	Basketball		Base- ball	Soft- ball	Ice Hockey		Soccer	
Team	School	City	Conference	Foot- ball	M	W	Base- ball	Soft- ball	M	W	M	W
Bluefield State Big Blues and Lady Blues	Bluefield State University	Bluefield	CIAA	Yes	Yes	Yes	Yes (Note: Bluefield State's baseball and women's soccer teams compete as independents.)	Yes	No	No	No	Yes
Charleston Golden Eagles	University of Charleston	Charleston	Mountain East	Yes	Yes	Yes	Yes	Yes	No	No	Yes	Yes
Concord Mountain Lions and Lady Lions	Concord University	Athens	Mountain East	Yes	Yes	Yes	Yes	Yes	No	No	Yes	Yes
Davis & Elkins Senators and Lady Senators	Davis & Elkins College	Elkins	Mountain East	No	Yes	Yes	Yes	Yes	No	No	Yes	Yes
Fairmont State Falcons	Fairmont State University	Fairmont	Mountain East	Yes	Yes	Yes	Yes	Yes	No	No	No	Yes
Glenville State Pioneers and Lady Pioneers	Glenville State University	Glenville	Mountain East	Yes	Yes	Yes	Yes	Yes	No	No	No	Yes
Salem Tigers	Salem University	Salem	Independent	No	Yes	Yes	Yes	Yes	No	No	Yes	Yes
Shepherd Rams	Shepherd University	Shepherdstown	Pennsylvania	Yes	Yes	Yes	Yes	Yes	No	No	Yes	Yes
West Liberty Hilltoppers and Lady Toppers	West Liberty University	West Liberty	Mountain East	Yes	Yes	Yes	Yes	Yes	No	No	Yes	Yes
West Virginia State Yellow Jackets	West Virginia State University	Institute	Mountain East	Yes	Yes	Yes	Yes	Yes	No	No	No	Yes
West Virginia Wesleyan Bobcats and Lady Bobcats	West Virginia Wesleyan College	Buckhannon	Mountain East	Yes	Yes	Yes	Yes	Yes	No	No	Yes	Yes
Wheeling Cardinals	Wheeling University	Wheeling	Mountain East	Yes	Yes	Yes	Yes	Yes	No	No	Yes	Yes

=== Division III ===
Team	School	City	Conference	Sport sponsorship								
Team	School	City	Conference	Foot- ball	Basketball		Base- ball	Soft- ball	Ice Hockey		Soccer	
Team	School	City	Conference	Foot- ball	M	W	Base- ball	Soft- ball	M	W	M	W
Bethany Bison	Bethany College	Bethany	Presidents'	Yes	Yes	Yes	Yes	Yes	No	No	Yes	Yes

== NAIA ==
Team	School	City	Conference	Sport sponsorship					
Team	School	City	Conference	Basketball		Base- ball	Soft- ball	Soccer	
Team	School	City	Conference	M	W	Base- ball	Soft- ball	M	W
West Virginia Tech Golden Bears	West Virginia University Institute of Technology	Beckley	River States	Yes	Yes	Yes	Yes	Yes	Yes

== NJCAA ==
Team	School	City	Conference
Potomac State Catamounts	Potomac State College of West Virginia University	Keyser	Western Pennsylvania

== NCCAA ==
Team	School	City	Conference
Appalachian Bible College Warriors	Appalachian Bible College	Mount Hope	DII Independent

== See also ==
- List of NCAA Division I institutions
- List of NCAA Division II institutions
- List of NCAA Division III institutions
- List of NAIA institutions
- List of USCAA institutions
- List of NCCAA institutions
- List of NJCAA Division I institutions
- List of NJCAA Division II institutions
- List of NJCAA Division III institutions
