= List of college athletic programs in Washington (state) =

This is a list of college athletic programs in the U.S. state of Washington.

== NCAA ==
=== Division I ===
Full NCAA Division I member colleges in Washington
– FBS Football, – FCS Football, – Non-football

Team	School	City	Conference	Sport sponsorship						
Team	School	City	Conference	Foot- ball	Basketball		Base- ball	Soft- ball	Soccer	
Team	School	City	Conference	Foot- ball	M	W	Base- ball	Soft- ball	M	W
Eastern Washington Eagles	Eastern Washington University	Cheney	Big Sky	FCS	Yes	Yes	No	No	No	Yes
Gonzaga Bulldogs	Gonzaga University	Spokane	West Coast	No	Yes	Yes	Yes	No	Yes	Yes
Seattle Redhawks	Seattle University	Seattle	West Coast	No	Yes	Yes	Yes	Yes	Yes	Yes
Washington Huskies	University of Washington	Seattle	Big Ten	FBS	Yes	Yes	Yes	Yes	Yes	Yes
Washington State Cougars	Washington State University	Pullman	Pac-12	FBS	Yes	Yes	Yes	No	No	Yes

=== Division II ===
Full NCAA Division II member colleges in Washington
– Football, – Non-football

Team	School	City	Conference	Sport sponsorship						
Team	School	City	Conference	Foot- ball	Basketball		Base- ball	Soft- ball	Soccer	
Team	School	City	Conference	Foot- ball	M	W	Base- ball	Soft- ball	M	W
Central Washington Wildcats	Central Washington University	Ellensburg	Great Northwest	Yes (Note: Central Washington's football team competes in the Lone Star Conference.)	Yes	Yes	Yes	Yes	No	Yes
Saint Martin's Saints	Saint Martin's University	Lacey	Great Northwest	No	Yes	Yes	Yes	Yes	Yes	Yes
Seattle Pacific Falcons	Seattle Pacific University	Seattle	Great Northwest	No	Yes	Yes	No	No	Yes	Yes
Western Washington Vikings	Western Washington University	Bellingham	Great Northwest	No	Yes	Yes	No	Yes	Yes	Yes

=== Division III ===
Full NCAA Division III member colleges in Washington
– Football, – Non-football

Team	School	City	Conference	Sport sponsorship						
Team	School	City	Conference	Foot- ball	Basketball		Base- ball	Soft- ball	Soccer	
Team	School	City	Conference	Foot- ball	M	W	Base- ball	Soft- ball	M	W
Pacific Lutheran Lutes	Pacific Lutheran University	Parkland	Northwest	Yes	Yes	Yes	Yes	Yes	Yes	Yes
Puget Sound Loggers	University of Puget Sound	Tacoma	Northwest	Yes	Yes	Yes	Yes	Yes	Yes	Yes
Whitman Blues	Whitman College	Walla Walla	Northwest	No	Yes	Yes	Yes	No	Yes	Yes
Whitworth Pirates	Whitworth University	Spokane	Northwest	Yes	Yes	Yes	Yes	Yes	Yes	Yes

== NAIA ==
Full NAIA member colleges in Washington
– Member location

Team	School	City	Conference	Sport sponsorship					
Team	School	City	Conference	Basketball		Base- ball	Soft- ball	Soccer	
Team	School	City	Conference	M	W	Base- ball	Soft- ball	M	W
Evergreen Geoducks	The Evergreen State College	Olympia	Cascade	Yes	Yes	No	No	Yes	Yes
Northwest Eagles	Northwest University	Kirkland	Cascade	Yes	Yes	No	Yes	Yes	Yes
Walla Walla Wolves	Walla Walla University	College Place	Cascade	Yes	Yes	No	No	Yes	No

== NWAC ==
Team	School	City	Conference
Bellevue Bulldogs	Bellevue College	Bellevue	NWAC Northern
Big Bend Vikings	Big Bend Community College	Moses Lake	NWAC Eastern
Centralia Trailblazers	Centralia College	Centralia	NWAC Western
Clark Penguins	Clark College	Vancouver	NWAC Eastern
Columbia Basin Hawks	Columbia Basin College	Pasco	NWAC Eastern
Edmonds Tritons	Edmonds College	Lynnwood	NWAC Northern
Everett Trojans	Everett Community College	Everett	NWAC Northern
Grays Harbor Chokers	Grays Harbor College	Aberdeen	NWAC Western
Green River Gators	Green River College	Auburn	NWAC Western
Highline Thunderbirds	Highline College	Des Moines	NWAC Western
Lower Columbia Red Devils	Lower Columbia College	Longview	NWAC Western
Olympic Rangers	Olympic College	Bremerton	NWAC Northern
Peninsula Pirates	Peninsula College	Port Angeles	NWAC Northern
Pierce Raiders	Pierce College	Lakewood	NWAC Western
Shoreline Dolphins	Shoreline Community College	Shoreline	NWAC Northern
Skagit Valley Cardinals	Skagit Valley College	Mount Vernon	NWAC Northern
South Puget Sound Clippers	South Puget Sound Community College	Olympia	NWAC Western
Spokane Sasquatch	Community Colleges of Spokane	Spokane	NWAC Eastern
Tacoma Titans	Tacoma Community College	Tacoma	NWAC Western
Walla Walla Warriors	Walla Walla Community College	Walla Walla	NWAC Eastern
Wenatchee Valley Knights	Wenatchee Valley College	Wenatchee	NWAC Eastern
Whatcom Orcas	Whatcom Community College	Bellingham	NWAC Northern
Yakima Valley Yaks	Yakima Valley College	Yakima	NWAC Eastern

== See also ==
- List of NCAA Division I institutions
- List of NCAA Division II institutions
- List of NCAA Division III institutions
- List of NAIA institutions
- List of USCAA institutions
- List of NCCAA institutions
