= List of college athletic programs in Nevada =

This is a list of college athletic programs in the U.S. state of Nevada.

Notes:

- This list is in a tabular format, with columns arranged in the following order, from left to right:
  - Athletic team description (short school name and nickname), with a link to the school's athletic program article if it exists. When only one nickname is listed, it is used for teams of both sexes. (Note that in recent years, many schools have chosen to use the same nickname for men's and women's teams even when the nickname is distinctly masculine.) When two nicknames are given, the first is used for men's teams and the other is used for women's teams. Different nicknames for a specific sport within a school are noted separately below the table.
  - Full name of school.
  - Location of school.
  - Conference of the school (if conference column is left blank, the school is either independent or the conference is unknown).
- Apart from the ongoing conversions, the following notes apply:
  - Following the normal standard of U.S. sports media, the terms "University" and "College" are ignored in alphabetization, unless necessary to distinguish schools (such as Boston College and Boston University) or are actually used by the media in normally describing the school, such as the College of Charleston.
  - Schools are also alphabetized by the names they are most commonly referred to by sports media, with non-intuitive examples included in parentheses next to the school name. This means, for example, that campuses bearing the name "University of North Carolina" may variously be found at "C" (Charlotte), "N" (North Carolina, referring to the Chapel Hill campus), and "U" (the Asheville, Greensboro, Pembroke, and Wilmington campuses, all normally referred to as UNC-{campus name}).
  - The prefix "St.", as in "Saint", is alphabetized as if it were spelled out.

== NCAA ==
=== Division I ===
Full NCAA Division I member colleges in Nevada.

Team	School	City	Conference	Sport sponsorship						
Team	School	City	Conference	Foot- ball	Basketball		Base- ball	Soft- ball	Soccer	
Team	School	City	Conference	Foot- ball	M	W	Base- ball	Soft- ball	M	W
Nevada Wolf Pack	University of Nevada, Reno	Reno	Mountain West	FBS	Yes	Yes	Yes	Yes	No	Yes
UNLV Rebels and Lady Rebels (Note: The men's basketball team is nicknamed "Runnin' Rebels".)	University of Nevada, Las Vegas	Paradise (Note: UNLV is located in Paradise, but has a Las Vegas street address.)	Mountain West	FBS	Yes	Yes	Yes	Yes	Yes (Note: UNLV's men's soccer team competes in the Western Athletic Conference.)	Yes

== NAIA ==
Full NAIA member colleges in Nevada.

Team	School	City	Conference
Nevada State Scorpions	Nevada State University	Henderson	Great Southwest

== NJCAA ==
Full NJCAA member colleges in Nevada.

Team	School	City	Conference
Southern Nevada Coyotes	College of Southern Nevada	Henderson	Scenic West
TMCC Mighty Lizards	Truckee Meadows Community College	Reno	Scenic West

== See also ==
- List of NCAA Division I institutions
- List of NCAA Division II institutions
- List of NCAA Division III institutions
- List of NAIA institutions
- List of USCAA institutions
- List of NCCAA institutions
- List of NJCAA Division I institutions
- List of NJCAA Division II institutions
- List of NJCAA Division III institutions
