= List of college athletic programs in New Mexico =

This is a list of college athletic programs in the U.S. state of New Mexico.

== NCAA ==
=== Division I ===
Full NCAA Division I member colleges in New Mexico.

Team	School	City	Conference	Sport sponsorship						
Team	School	City	Conference	Football	Basketball		Baseball	Softball	Soccer	
Team	School	City	Conference	Football	M	W	Baseball	Softball	M	W
New Mexico Lobos	University of New Mexico	Albuquerque	Mountain West	FBS	Yes	Yes	Yes	Yes	No	Yes
New Mexico State Aggies	New Mexico State University	Las Cruces	C-USA	FBS	Yes	Yes	Yes	Yes	No	Yes

=== Division II ===
Full NCAA Division II member colleges in New Mexico.

Team	School	City	Conference	Sport sponsorship						
Team	School	City	Conference	Football	Basketball		Baseball	Softball	Soccer	
Team	School	City	Conference	Football	M	W	Baseball	Softball	M	W
Eastern New Mexico Greyhounds	Eastern New Mexico University	Portales	Lone Star	Yes	Yes	Yes	Yes	Yes	No	Yes
New Mexico Highlands Cowboys and Cowgirls	New Mexico Highlands University	Las Vegas	Rocky Mountain	Yes	Yes	Yes	Yes	Yes	No	Yes
Western New Mexico Mustangs	Western New Mexico University	Silver City	Lone Star	Yes	Yes	Yes	No	Yes	No	No

== NAIA ==
NAIA member colleges in New Mexico.

Team	School	City	Conference	Sport sponsorship					
Team	School	City	Conference	Basketball		Baseball	Softball	Soccer	
Team	School	City	Conference	M	W	Baseball	Softball	M	W
Southwest Mustangs	University of the Southwest	Hobbs	Red River	Yes	Yes	Yes	Yes	Yes	Yes
Northern New Mexico Eagles	Northern New Mexico College	Espanola	Cal Pac	Yes	Yes	No	No	No	No

== NJCAA ==
Full NJCAA member colleges in New Mexico.
- Football, - Non-Football

Team	School	City	Conference
Luna Rough Riders	Luna Community College	Las Vegas	Western JC
New Mexico Junior College Thunderbirds	New Mexico Junior College	Hobbs	Western JC
New Mexico Military Broncos	New Mexico Military Institute	Roswell	Western JC

== USCAA ==
Team	School	City	Conference
Diné Warriors	Diné College	Shiprock	
Navajo Tech Hawks	Navajo Technical University	Crownpoint	

== See also ==
- List of NCAA Division I institutions
- List of NCAA Division II institutions
- List of NCAA Division III institutions
- List of NAIA institutions
- List of USCAA institutions
- List of NCCAA institutions
- List of NJCAA Division I institutions
- List of NJCAA Division II institutions
- List of NJCAA Division III institutions
