= List of college athletic programs in Rhode Island =

List of athletics programs at universities and colleges in Rhode Island

The list below of college athletic programs in the U.S. state of Rhode Island is in tabular format, with columns arranged left to right in the following order: team name, school name, school location, conference, and sport sponsorship with football, basketball (men and women), baseball, softball, ice hockey (men and women), and soccer (men and women) listed. Different team name for a specific sport within a school are noted separately below the table.

== NCAA ==
=== Division I ===
Full NCAA Division I member colleges in Rhode Island.
– FCS Football, – Non-Football

Team	School	City	Conference	Sport sponsorship								
Team	School	City	Conference	Foot- ball	Basketball		Base- ball	Soft- ball	Ice hockey		Soccer	
Team	School	City	Conference	Foot- ball	M	W	Base- ball	Soft- ball	M	W	M	W
Brown Bears	Brown University	Providence	Ivy League	FCS	Yes	Yes	Yes	Yes	Yes (Note: Brown's ice hockey teams compete in ECAC Hockey.)	Yes	Yes	Yes
Bryant Bulldogs	Bryant University	Smithfield	America East	FCS (Note: Bryant's football team competes in CAA Football, the technically separate football league operated by the all-sports Coastal Athletic Association.)	Yes	Yes	Yes	Yes	No	No	Yes	Yes
Providence Friars	Providence College	Providence	Big East	No	Yes	Yes	No	Yes	Yes (Note: Providence's ice hockey teams compete in Hockey East.)	Yes	Yes	Yes
Rhode Island Rams	University of Rhode Island	Kingston	Atlantic 10	FCS (Note: Rhode Island's football team competes in CAA Football, the technically separate football league operated by the all-sports Coastal Athletic Association.)	Yes	Yes	Yes	Yes	No	No	Yes	Yes

=== Division III ===
Full NCAA Division III member colleges in Rhode Island.
– Football member, – Non-Football

Team	School	City	Conference	Sport sponsorship								
Team	School	City	Conference	Foot- ball	Basketball		Base- ball	Soft- ball	Ice hockey		Soccer	
Team	School	City	Conference	Foot- ball	M	W	Base- ball	Soft- ball	M	W	M	W
Johnson & Wales–Providence Wildcats	Johnson and Wales University Providence	Providence	Conference of New England	No	Yes	Yes	Yes	Yes	Yes	Yes	Yes	Yes
Rhode Island College Anchormen	Rhode Island College	Providence	Little East	No	Yes	Yes	Yes	Yes	No	No	Yes	Yes
Roger Williams Hawks	Roger Williams University	Bristol	Conference of New England	No	Yes	Yes	Yes	Yes	Yes	No	Yes	Yes
Salve Regina Seahawks	Salve Regina University	Newport	NEWMAC	Yes	Yes	Yes	Yes	Yes	Yes	Yes (Note: Salve Regina's women's ice hockey team competes in the Conference of New England.)	Yes	Yes

== NJCAA ==
Team	School	City	Conference	Sport sponsorship								
Team	School	City	Conference	Foot- ball	Basketball		Base- ball	Soft- ball	Ice hockey		Soccer	
Team	School	City	Conference	Foot- ball	M	W	Base- ball	Soft- ball	M	W	M	W
Community College of Rhode Island Knights	Community College of Rhode Island	Warwick	Massachusetts CC	No	Yes	Yes	Yes	Yes	No	No	Yes	Yes

== Independent ==
Team	School	City	Sport sponsorship
Team	School	City	Basketball
Team	School	City	M
RISD Balls	Rhode Island School of Design	Providence	Yes

== See also ==
- List of NCAA Division I institutions
- List of NCAA Division II institutions
- List of NCAA Division III institutions
- List of NAIA institutions
- List of USCAA institutions
- List of NCCAA institutions
- List of NJCAA Division I institutions
- List of NJCAA Division II institutions
- List of NJCAA Division III institutions
