= List of college athletic programs in Delaware =

This is a list of college athletic programs in the U.S. state of Delaware.

== NCAA ==
=== Division I ===
Full NCAA Division I member colleges in Delaware.
– FBS Football

Team	School	City	Conference	Sport sponsorship						
Team	School	City	Conference	Football	Basketball		Baseball	Softball	Soccer	
Team	School	City	Conference	Football	M	W	Baseball	Softball	M	W
Delaware Fightin' Blue Hens	University of Delaware	Newark	Conference USA	FBS	Yes	Yes	Yes	Yes	Yes	Yes
Delaware State Hornets and Lady Hornets	Delaware State University	Dover	MEAC	FCS	Yes	Yes	Yes (Note: Delaware State's baseball and women's soccer teams compete in the Northeast Conference.)	Yes	No	Yes

=== Division II ===
Full NCAA Division II member colleges in Delaware.

Team	School	City	Conference	Sport sponsorship						
Team	School	City	Conference	Football	Basketball		Baseball	Softball	Soccer	
Team	School	City	Conference	Football	M	W	Baseball	Softball	M	W
Goldey-Beacom Lightning	Goldey-Beacom College	Pike Creek Valley	Central Atlantic	No	Yes	Yes	Yes	Yes	Yes	Yes
Wilmington Wildcats	Wilmington University	New Castle (Note: Wilmington University has a New Castle street address, but the campus is located within the city limits of Wilmington Manor.)	Central Atlantic	No	Yes	Yes	Yes	Yes	Yes	Yes

== NJCAA ==
Team	School	City	Conference
Delaware Tech-Stanton/Wilmington Spirit	Delaware Technical & Community College	Newark	Eastern Pennsylvania
Delaware Tech-Terry Hawks	Delaware Technical & Community College	Dover	Eastern Pennsylvania
Delaware Tech-Georgetown Roadrunners	Delaware Technical & Community College	Georgetown	Eastern Pennsylvania

== See also ==
- List of NCAA Division I institutions
- List of NCAA Division II institutions
- List of NCAA Division III institutions
- List of NAIA institutions
- List of USCAA institutions
- List of NCCAA institutions
- List of NJCAA Division I institutions
- List of NJCAA Division II institutions
- List of NJCAA Division III institutions
