= List of college athletic programs in Indiana =

This is a list of college athletic programs in the U.S. state of Indiana.

== NCAA ==
=== Division I ===
Full NCAA Division I member colleges in Indiana.
– FBS Football, – FCS Football, – Non-football

Team	School	City	Conference	Sport sponsorship								
Team	School	City	Conference	Football	Basketball		Baseball	Softball	Ice hockey		Soccer	
Team	School	City	Conference	Football	M	W	Baseball	Softball	M	W	M	W
Ball State Cardinals	Ball State University	Muncie	MAC	FBS	Yes	Yes	Yes	Yes	No	No	No	Yes
Butler Bulldogs	Butler University	Indianapolis	Big East	FCS (Note: Butler and Valparaiso's football teams compete in the Pioneer Football League.)	Yes	Yes	Yes	Yes	No	No	Yes	Yes
Evansville Purple Aces	University of Evansville	Evansville	Missouri Valley	No	Yes	Yes	Yes	Yes	No	No	Yes	Yes
Indiana Hoosiers	Indiana University Bloomington	Bloomington	Big Ten	FBS	Yes	Yes	Yes	Yes	No	No	Yes	Yes
Indiana State Sycamores	Indiana State University	Terre Haute	Missouri Valley	FCS (Note: Indiana State's football team competes in the Missouri Valley Football Conference.)	Yes	Yes	Yes	Yes	No	No	No	Yes
IU Indy Jaguars	Indiana University Indianapolis	Indianapolis	Horizon	No	Yes	Yes	No	Yes	No	No	Yes	Yes
Notre Dame Fighting Irish	University of Notre Dame	Notre Dame	ACC	FBS (Note: Notre Dame's football team competes as an independent.)	Yes	Yes	Yes	Yes	Yes (Note: Notre Dame's men's ice hockey team competes in the Big Ten Conference.)	No	Yes	Yes
Purdue Boilermakers	Purdue University	West Lafayette	Big Ten	FBS	Yes	Yes	Yes	Yes	No	No	No	Yes
Purdue Fort Wayne Mastodons	Purdue University Fort Wayne	Fort Wayne	Horizon	No	Yes	Yes	Yes	Yes	No	No	Yes	Yes
Southern Indiana Screaming Eagles	University of Southern Indiana	Evansville	Ohio Valley	No	Yes	Yes	Yes	Yes	No	No	Yes	Yes
Valparaiso Beacons	Valparaiso University	Valparaiso	Missouri Valley	FCS	Yes	Yes	Yes	Yes	No	No	No	Yes

=== Division II ===
Full NCAA Division II member colleges in Indiana.
– Football, – Non-football

Team	School	City	Conference	Sport sponsorship								
Team	School	City	Conference	Football	Basketball		Baseball	Softball	Ice hockey		Soccer	
Team	School	City	Conference	Football	M	W	Baseball	Softball	M	W	M	W
Indianapolis Greyhounds	University of Indianapolis	Indianapolis	Great Lakes Valley	Yes	Yes	Yes	Yes	Yes	No	No	Yes	Yes
Purdue Northwest Pride	Purdue University Northwest	Hammond	GLIAC	No	Yes	Yes	Yes	Yes	No	No	Yes	Yes

=== Division III ===
Full NCAA Division III member colleges in Indiana.
– HCAC, – Michigan, – North Coast
Football, Non-football

Team	School	City	Conference	Sport sponsorship								
Team	School	City	Conference	Football	Basketball		Baseball	Softball	Ice hockey		Soccer	
Team	School	City	Conference	Football	M	W	Baseball	Softball	M	W	M	W
Anderson Ravens	Anderson University	Anderson	HCAC	Yes	Yes	Yes	Yes	Yes	No	No	Yes	Yes
DePauw Tigers	DePauw University	Greencastle	North Coast	Yes	Yes	Yes	Yes	Yes	No	No	Yes	Yes
Earlham Hustlin' Quakers	Earlham College	Richmond	HCAC	No	Yes	Yes	Yes	No	No	No	Yes	Yes
Franklin Grizzlies	Franklin College	Franklin	HCAC	Yes	Yes	Yes	Yes	Yes	No	No	Yes	Yes
Hanover Panthers	Hanover College	Hanover	HCAC	Yes	Yes	Yes	Yes	Yes	No	No	Yes	Yes
Manchester Spartans	Manchester University	North Manchester	HCAC	Yes	Yes	Yes	Yes	Yes	No	No	Yes	Yes
Rose-Hulman Fightin' Engineers	Rose-Hulman Institute of Technology	Terre Haute	HCAC	Yes	Yes	Yes	Yes	Yes	No	No	Yes	Yes
St. Mary's Belles	Saint Mary's College	Notre Dame	Michigan	No	No	Yes	No	Yes	No	No	No	Yes
Trine Thunder	Trine University	Angola	Michigan	Yes	Yes	Yes	Yes	Yes	Yes (Note: Trine's ice hockey teams compete in the Northern Collegiate Hockey Association.)	Yes	Yes	Yes
Wabash Little Giants	Wabash College	Crawfordsville	North Coast	Yes	Yes	No	Yes	No	No	No	Yes	No

=== NAIA ===
Full NAIA member colleges in Indiana.
– Football, – Sprint Football, – Non-football

Team	School	City	Conference	Sport sponsorship						
Team	School	City	Conference	Football	Basketball		Baseball	Softball	Soccer	
Team	School	City	Conference	Football	M	W	Baseball	Softball	M	W
Bethel Pilots	Bethel University	Mishawaka	Crossroads	No	Yes	Yes	Yes	Yes	Yes	Yes
CCSJ Crimson Wave	Calumet College of St. Joseph	Whiting	CCAC	(Note: Calumet fields a team in sprint football, a weight-restricted form of football not governed by the NCAA or NAIA, as a members of the Midwest Sprint Football League (MSFL), but will transition their sprint football team to a full NAIA program in 2027–28.)	Yes	Yes	Yes	Yes	Yes	Yes
Goshen Maple Leafs	Goshen College	Goshen	Crossroads	No	Yes	Yes	Yes	Yes	Yes	Yes
Grace Lancers	Grace College	Winona Lake	Crossroads	No	Yes	Yes	Yes	Yes	Yes	Yes
Holy Cross Saints	Holy Cross College	Notre Dame	CCAC	No	Yes	Yes	No	No	Yes	Yes
Huntington Foresters	Huntington University	Huntington	Crossroads	No	Yes	Yes	Yes	Yes	Yes	Yes
Indiana-Columbus Crimson Pride	Indiana University Columbus	Columbus	RSC	No	Yes	Yes	Yes	Yes	Yes	Yes
Indiana-East Red Wolves	Indiana University East	Richmond	RSC	No	Yes	Yes	No	No	Yes	Yes
Indiana-Kokomo Cougars	Indiana University Kokomo	Kokomo	RSC	No	Yes	Yes	Yes	No	No	Yes
Indiana-Northwest Redhawks	Indiana University Northwest	Gary	CCAC	No	Yes	Yes	No	No	Yes	Yes
Indiana-South Bend Titans	Indiana University South Bend	South Bend	CCAC	No	Yes	Yes	Yes	Yes	No	Yes
Indiana-Southeast Grenadiers	Indiana University Southeast	New Albany	RSC	No	Yes	Yes	Yes	Yes	No	No
Indiana Tech Warriors	Indiana Institute of Technology	Fort Wayne	WHAC	No	Yes	Yes	Yes	Yes	Yes	Yes
Indiana Wesleyan Wildcats	Indiana Wesleyan University	Marion	Crossroads	Yes (Note: Indiana Wesleyan, Marian, Saint Francis, Saint Mary-of-the-Woods, and Taylor's football teams compete in the Mid-States Football Association.)	Yes	Yes	Yes	Yes	Yes	Yes
Marian Knights	Marian University	Indianapolis	Crossroads	Yes	Yes	Yes	Yes	Yes	Yes	Yes
Saint Francis Cougars	University of Saint Francis	Fort Wayne	Crossroads	Yes	Yes	Yes	Yes	Yes	Yes	Yes
Saint Mary-of-the-Woods Pomeroys	Saint Mary-of-the-Woods College	St. Mary's	RSC	Yes	Yes	Yes	No	Yes	Yes	Yes
Taylor Trojans	Taylor University	Upland	Crossroads	Yes	Yes	Yes	Yes	Yes	Yes	Yes

== NJCAA ==
Team	School	City	Conference
Vincennes Trailblazers	Vincennes University	Vincennes	MWAC

== See also ==
- List of NCAA Division I institutions
- List of NCAA Division II institutions
- List of NCAA Division III institutions
- List of NAIA institutions
- List of USCAA institutions
- List of NCCAA institutions
- List of NJCAA Division I institutions
- List of NJCAA Division II institutions
- List of NJCAA Division III institutions
