= Cascade College =

Christian college in Portland, Oregon, U.S.

- Former names: Columbia Christian College (1956 – 1993)
- Type: Christian college
- Active: 1956–May 2009
- Affiliations: Churches of Christ
- Director: William Goad
- Undergraduates: 300+
- Location: 9101 E. Burnside Street; Portland, Oregon 97216; 45.5238°N 122.5695°W
- Nickname: Thunderbirds
- Website: cascadethunderbirds.com

Cascade College was a private, four-year, liberal arts college associated with the Churches of Christ. Located in Portland, Oregon, United States, it was a branch campus of Oklahoma Christian University. Its mission was to emphasize spiritual growth and career preparation. Oklahoma Christian University closed Cascade at the end of the 2009 academic year due to financial problems.

== History ==
Cascade had been founded as Columbia Christian College in 1956. For several years, Columbia had serious financial difficulties. Partially as a consequence, its regional accreditation was revoked. The school's board sought help from other colleges affiliated with Churches of Christ. Oklahoma Christian University agreed to fund the college as a branch campus. The newly renamed Cascade College opened in Fall 1994 after its acceptance as a branch by Oklahoma Christian University, with 143 students attending the first semester.

As a branch campus of Oklahoma Christian, Cascade College was accredited by The Higher Learning Commission of the North Central Association of Colleges and Schools and was authorized by the State of Oregon to offer and confer academic degrees. In October 2008, plans were announced to close Cascade, because of financial difficulties, at the end of the 2009 academic year.

== Academics ==
The college offered degree programs in pre-nursing, religion, business, marketing, English, interdisciplinary studies, elementary education, biology, communications and psychology.

== Student life ==
Cascade College had a variety of activities, including service clubs, fraternities, sororities, drama club, psychology club, diversity club, instrumental groups, The Nature Society, Witness, campus ministry, academic clubs, theater and choir opportunities.

== Athletics ==
The Cascade athletic teams were called the Thunderbirds. The college was a member of the National Association of Intercollegiate Athletics (NAIA), primarily competing in the Cascade Collegiate Conference (CCC) from 1997–98 to 2008–09. The mascot was the Thunderbird.

Cascade competed in nine intercollegiate varsity sports: Men's sports included basketball, cross country, soccer and track & field; while women's sports included basketball, cross country, soccer, track & field and volleyball.

== Campus ==
The 11-acre historic Cascade College campus was purchased from Oklahoma Christian University and Cascade Inc. by Columbia Christian Schools in 2012. Warner Pacific College, another Portland area Christian liberal arts college, and former partner with Cascade College, houses several continuing education classrooms and a computer lab.

== Controversies ==
Many questioned the decision to close the college in light of several multimillion-dollar projects which Oklahoma Christian had undertaken in recent years, including the erection of a clock tower estimated to cost $30 million.
