= List of college athletic programs in Nebraska =

This is a list of college athletic programs in the U.S. state of Nebraska.

Notes:

- This list is in a tabular format, with columns arranged in the following order, from left to right:
  - Athletic team description (short school name and nickname), with a link to the school's athletic program article if it exists. When only one nickname is listed, it is used for teams of both sexes. (Note that in recent years, many schools have chosen to use the same nickname for men's and women's teams even when the nickname is distinctly masculine.) When two nicknames are given, the first is used for men's teams and the other is used for women's teams. Different nicknames for a specific sport within a school are noted separately below the table.
  - Full name of school.
  - Location of school.
  - Conference of the school (if conference column is left blank, the school is either independent or the conference is unknown).
- Apart from the ongoing conversions, the following notes apply:
  - Following the normal standard of U.S. sports media, the terms "University" and "College" are ignored in alphabetization, unless necessary to distinguish schools (such as Boston College and Boston University) or are actually used by the media in normally describing the school (formerly the case for the College of Charleston, but media now use "Charleston" for that school's athletic program).
  - Schools are also alphabetized by the names they are most commonly referred to by sports media, with non-intuitive examples included in parentheses next to the school name. This means, for example, that campuses bearing the name "University of North Carolina" may variously be found at "C" (Charlotte), "N" (North Carolina, referring to the Chapel Hill campus), and "U" (the Asheville, Greensboro, Pembroke, and Wilmington campuses, all normally referred to as UNC-{campus name}).
  - The prefix "St.", as in "Saint", is alphabetized as if it were spelled out.

== NCAA ==
=== Division I ===
Full NCAA Division I member colleges in Nebraska:
- FBS football, - non-football

| Team | School | City | Conference | Sport sponsorship | | | | | | | | |
| Team | School | City | Conference | Football | Basketball | | Baseball | Softball | Ice hockey | | Soccer | |
| Team | School | City | Conference | Football | M | W | Baseball | Softball | M | W | M | W |
|---|---|---|---|---|---|---|---|---|---|---|---|---|
| Creighton Bluejays | Creighton University | Omaha | Big East | No | Yes | Yes | Yes | Yes | No | No | Yes | Yes |
| Nebraska Cornhuskers | University of Nebraska-Lincoln | Lincoln | Big Ten | FBS (Note: Nebraska additionally sponsors flag football as a women's varsity sport and will begin competing in 2027.) | Yes | Yes | Yes | Yes | No | No | No | Yes |
| Omaha Mavericks | University of Nebraska Omaha | Omaha | Summit | No | Yes | Yes | Yes | Yes | Yes (Note: Omaha's men's ice hockey team competes in the National Collegiate Hockey Conference.) | No | Yes | Yes |

=== Division II ===
Full NCAA Division II member colleges in Nebraska

| Team | School | City | Conference | Sport sponsorship | | | | | | | | |
| Team | School | City | Conference | Football | Basketball | | Baseball | Softball | Ice hockey | | Soccer | |
| Team | School | City | Conference | Football | M | W | Baseball | Softball | M | W | M | W |
|---|---|---|---|---|---|---|---|---|---|---|---|---|
| Chadron State Eagles | Chadron State College | Chadron | Rocky Mountain | Yes | Yes | Yes | No | Yes | No | No | No | No |
| Nebraska-Kearney Lopers | University of Nebraska at Kearney | Kearney | MIAA | Yes | Yes | Yes | No | Yes | No | No | No | Yes |
| Wayne State Wildcats | Wayne State College | Wayne | Northern Sun | Yes | Yes | Yes | Yes | Yes | No | No | No | Yes |

=== Division III ===
Full NCAA Division III member colleges in Nebraska

| Team | School | City | Conference | Sport sponsorship | | | | | | | | |
| Team | School | City | Conference | Football | Basketball | | Baseball | Softball | Ice hockey | | Soccer | |
| Team | School | City | Conference | Football | M | W | Baseball | Softball | M | W | M | W |
|---|---|---|---|---|---|---|---|---|---|---|---|---|
| Nebraska Wesleyan Prairie Wolves | Nebraska Wesleyan University | Lincoln | American Rivers | Yes | Yes | Yes | Yes | Yes | No | No | Yes | Yes |

== NAIA ==
NAIA member colleges in Nebraska:
– football, – non-football

| Team | School | City | Conference | Sport sponsorship | | | | | | |
| Team | School | City | Conference | Football | Basketball | | Baseball | Softball | Soccer | |
| Team | School | City | Conference | Football | M | W | Baseball | Softball | M | W |
|---|---|---|---|---|---|---|---|---|---|---|
| Bellevue Bruins | Bellevue University | Bellevue | Frontier | No | Yes | Yes | Yes | Yes | Yes (Note: Bellevue's soccer teams compete as independents.) | Yes |
| Concordia Bulldogs | Concordia University, Nebraska | Seward | Great Plains | Yes | Yes | Yes | Yes | Yes | Yes | Yes |
| Doane Tigers | Doane University | Crete | Great Plains | Yes | Yes | Yes | Yes | Yes | Yes | Yes |
| Hastings Broncos | Hastings College | Hastings | Great Plains | Yes (Note: Midland and Hastings additionally sponsor flag football as a women's varsity sport and compete in the Kansas Collegiate Athletic Conference.) | Yes | Yes | Yes | Yes | Yes | Yes |
| Midland Warriors | Midland University | Fremont | Great Plains | Yes | Yes | Yes | Yes | Yes | Yes | Yes |
| Peru State Bobcats | Peru State College | Peru | Heart of America | Yes | Yes | Yes | Yes | Yes | No | No |
| Saint Mary Flames | College of Saint Mary | Omaha | Great Plains | No | No | Yes | No | Yes | No | Yes |
| York Panthers | York University | York | Kansas | No | Yes | Yes | Yes | Yes | Yes | Yes |

== NJCAA ==
| Team | School | City | Conference |
|---|---|---|---|
| Central-Columbus Raiders | Central Community College at Columbus | Columbus | Nebraska CC |
| Little Priest Tribal Warriors | Little Priest Tribal College | Winnebago | Iowa CC |
| McCook Indians | Mid-Plains Community College | McCook | Nebraska CC |
| North Platte Knights | Mid-Plains Community College | North Platte | Nebraska CC |
| Northeast Hawks | Northeast Community College | Norfolk | Iowa CC |
| Southeast Bobcats | Southeast Community College | Beatrice | Nebraska CC |
| Western Nebraska Cougars | Western Nebraska Community College | Scottsbluff | Nebraska CC |

== Other ==
| Team | School | City | Association |
|---|---|---|---|
| Union Warriors | Union Adventist University | Lincoln | ACCA & NCCAA |
| NCTA Aggies | Nebraska College of Technical Agriculture | Curtis | None |

== Defunct ==
| Team | School | City | Year of closure |
|---|---|---|---|
| Bellevue Redmen | Bellevue College | Bellevue | 1918 |
| Cotner Bulldogs | Cotner College | Bethany | 1933 |
| Dana Vikings | Dana College | Blair | 2010 |
| Grace Royals | Grace University | Omaha | 2018 |
| Grand Island Islanders | Grand Island College | Grand Island | 1931 |
| Hiram Scott Scots | Hiram Scott College | Scottsbluff | 1972 |
| Kennedy Patriots & Patriettes | John F. Kennedy College | Wahoo | 1975 |
| LSC ??? / Hamilton Aliens | Lincoln School of Commerce | Lincoln | 2004 |
| Luther Vikings | Luther College | Wahoo | 1962 |
| Nebraska Central Fighting Quakers | Nebraska Central College | Central City | 1953 |
| Nebraska Christian Sentinels | Nebraska Christian College | Papillion | 2020 |
| Omaha Commercial Commercials | Omaha Commercial College | Omaha | 1911 |
| Omaha Medical Medics | Omaha Medical College | Omaha | 1902 |
| Pershing ??? | John J. Pershing College | Beatrice | 1971 |

== See also ==
- List of NCAA Division I institutions
- List of NCAA Division II institutions
- List of NCAA Division III institutions
- List of NAIA institutions
- List of USCAA institutions
- List of NCCAA institutions
- List of NJCAA Division I institutions
- List of NJCAA Division II institutions
- List of NJCAA Division III institutions
