= List of college athletic programs in Utah =

This is a list of college athletic programs in the U.S. state of Utah.

Notes:

- This list is in a tabular format, with columns arranged in the following order, from left to right:
  - Athletic team description (short school name and nickname), with a link to the school's athletic program article if it exists. When only one nickname is listed, it is used for teams of both sexes. (Note that in recent years, many schools have chosen to use the same nickname for men's and women's teams even when the nickname is distinctly masculine.) When two nicknames are given, the first is used for men's teams and the other is used for women's teams. Different nicknames for a specific sport within a school are noted separately below the table.
  - Full name of school.
  - Location of school.
  - Conference of the school (if conference column is left blank, the school is either independent or the conference is unknown).
- Apart from the ongoing conversions, the following notes apply:
  - Following the normal standard of U.S. sports media, the terms "University" and "College" are ignored in alphabetization, unless necessary to distinguish schools (such as Boston College and Boston University) or are actually used by the media in normally describing the school (formerly the case for the College of Charleston, but media now use "Charleston" for that school's athletic program).
  - Schools are also alphabetized by the names they are most commonly referred to by sports media, with non-intuitive examples included in parentheses next to the school name. This means, for example, that campuses bearing the name "University of North Carolina" may variously be found at "C" (Charlotte), "N" (North Carolina, referring to the Chapel Hill campus), and "U" (the Asheville, Greensboro, Pembroke, and Wilmington campuses, all normally referred to as UNC-{campus name}).
  - The prefix "St.", as in "Saint", is alphabetized as if it were spelled out.

== NCAA ==
=== Division I ===
Full NCAA Division I member colleges in Utah.
– FBS Football, – FCS Football, – Non-football

Team	School	City	Conference	Sport sponsorship								
Team	School	City	Conference	Foot- ball	Basketball		Base- ball	Soft- ball	Ice Hockey		Soccer	
Team	School	City	Conference	Foot- ball	M	W	Base- ball	Soft- ball	M	W	M	W
BYU Cougars	Brigham Young University	Provo	Big 12	FBS	Yes	Yes	Yes	Yes	No	No	No	Yes
Southern Utah Thunderbirds	Southern Utah University	Cedar City	WAC	FCS (Note: Southern Utah and Utah Tech's football programs both compete in the United Athletic Conference.)	Yes	Yes	No	Yes	No	No	No	Yes
Utah Utes (Note: The men's basketball team is nicknamed "Runnin' Utes", and the women's gymnastics team is nicknamed "Red Rocks".)	University of Utah	Salt Lake City	Big 12	FBS	Yes	Yes	Yes	Yes	No	No	No	Yes
Utah State Aggies	Utah State University	Logan	Mountain West	FBS	Yes	Yes	No	Yes	No	No	No	Yes
Utah Tech Trailblazers	Utah Tech University	St. George	WAC	FCS	Yes	Yes	Yes	Yes	No	No	Yes	Yes
Utah Valley Wolverines	Utah Valley University	Orem	WAC (Note: Utah Valley University will move to the Big West Conference on July 1, 2026.)	No	Yes	Yes	Yes	Yes	No	No	Yes	Yes
Weber State Wildcats	Weber State University	Ogden	Big Sky	FCS	Yes	Yes	No	Yes	No	No	No	Yes

=== Division II ===
Team	School	City	Conference	Sport sponsorship								
Team	School	City	Conference	Foot- ball	Basketball		Base- ball	Soft- ball	Ice Hockey		Soccer	
Team	School	City	Conference	Foot- ball	M	W	Base- ball	Soft- ball	M	W	M	W
Westminster Griffins	Westminster University	Salt Lake City	Rocky Mountain	No	Yes	Yes	No	No	No	No	Yes	Yes

== NJCAA ==
Team	School	City	Conference
USU Eastern Eagles	Utah State University Eastern	Price	Scenic West
Salt Lake Bruins	Salt Lake Community College	Salt Lake City	Scenic West
Snow Badgers	Snow College	Ephraim	Scenic West

== See also ==
- List of NCAA Division I institutions
- List of NCAA Division II institutions
- List of NCAA Division III institutions
- List of NAIA institutions
- List of USCAA institutions
- List of NCCAA institutions
- List of NJCAA Division I institutions
- List of NJCAA Division II institutions
- List of NJCAA Division III institutions
