= List of college athletic programs in Colorado =

Coordinates: 38.9972°N 105.5478°W

The location of the State of Colorado in the United States

This is a list of college athletic programs in the U.S. state of Colorado.

== NCAA ==
=== Division I ===
Full NCAA Division I member colleges in Colorado
– FBS Football, – FCS Football, – Non-football

| Team | School | City | Conference | Sport sponsorship | | | | | | | | |
| Team | School | City | Conference | Foot- ball | Basketball | | Base- ball | Soft- ball | Ice hockey | | Soccer | |
| Team | School | City | Conference | Foot- ball | M | W | Base- ball | Soft- ball | M | W | M | W |
|---|---|---|---|---|---|---|---|---|---|---|---|---|
| Air Force Falcons | United States Air Force Academy | Air Force Academy (Note: Virtually the entire U.S. Air Force Academy is located just north of the city limits of Colorado Springs. The U.S. Postal Service considers the academy to be an unincorporated census-designated place, separate from the city of Colorado Springs.) | Mountain West | FBS | Yes | Yes | Yes | No | Yes (Note: Air Force's ice hockey team competes in Atlantic Hockey.) | No | Yes (Note: Air Force's men's soccer team competes in the Western Athletic Conference.) | Yes |
| Colorado Buffaloes | University of Colorado Boulder | Boulder | Big 12 | FBS | Yes | Yes | No | No | No | No | No | Yes |
| Colorado State Rams | Colorado State University | Fort Collins | Pac-12 | FBS | Yes | Yes | No | Yes | No | No | No | Yes |
| Denver Pioneers | University of Denver | Denver | Summit | No | Yes | Yes | No | No | Yes (Note: Denver's ice hockey team competes in the National Collegiate Hockey Conference.) | No | Yes | Yes |
| Northern Colorado Bears | University of Northern Colorado | Greeley | Big Sky | FCS | Yes | Yes | Yes (Note: Northern Colorado's baseball team competes in the Summit League.) | Yes | No | No | No | Yes |

=== Division II ===
Full NCAA Division II member colleges in Colorado
– Football member, – Non-football member

| Team | School | City | Conference | Sport sponsorship | | | | | | |
| Team | School | City | Conference | Foot- ball | Basketball | | Base- ball | Soft- ball | Soccer | |
| Team | School | City | Conference | Foot- ball | M | W | Base- ball | Soft- ball | M | W |
|---|---|---|---|---|---|---|---|---|---|---|
| Adams State Grizzlies | Adams State University | Alamosa | Rocky Mountain | Yes | Yes | Yes | Yes | Yes | Yes | Yes |
| Colorado Christian Cougars | Colorado Christian University | Lakewood | Rocky Mountain | No | Yes | Yes | Yes | Yes | Yes | Yes |
| Colorado Mesa Mavericks | Colorado Mesa University | Grand Junction | Rocky Mountain | Yes | Yes | Yes | Yes | Yes | Yes | Yes |
| Colorado Mines Orediggers | Colorado School of Mines | Golden | Rocky Mountain | Yes | Yes | Yes | Yes | Yes | Yes | Yes |
| CSU Pueblo ThunderWolves | Colorado State University–Pueblo | Pueblo | Rocky Mountain | Yes | Yes | Yes | Yes | Yes | Yes | Yes |
| Fort Lewis Skyhawks | Fort Lewis College | Durango | Rocky Mountain | Yes | Yes | Yes | No | Yes | Yes | Yes |
| MSU Denver Roadrunners | Metropolitan State University of Denver | Denver | Rocky Mountain | No | Yes | Yes | Yes | Yes | Yes | Yes |
| Regis Rangers | Regis University | Denver | Rocky Mountain | No | Yes | Yes | Yes | Yes | Yes | Yes |
| UCCS Mountain Lions | University of Colorado–Colorado Springs | Colorado Springs | Rocky Mountain | No | Yes | Yes | Yes | Yes | Yes | Yes |
| Western Colorado Mountaineers | Western Colorado University | Gunnison | Rocky Mountain | Yes | Yes | Yes | No | No | No | Yes |

=== Division III ===
Full NCAA Division III member colleges in Colorado

| Team | School | City | Conference | Sport sponsorship | | | | | |
| Team | School | City | Conference | Basketball | | Ice hockey | | Soccer | |
| Team | School | City | Conference | M | W | M | W | M | W |
|---|---|---|---|---|---|---|---|---|---|
| Colorado College Tigers | Colorado College | Colorado Springs | Southern Collegiate | Yes | Yes | Yes (Note: Colorado College's ice hockey team competes in Division I as a member of the National Collegiate Hockey Conference.) | No | Yes | Yes (Note: Colorado College's women's soccer team competes in Division I as a member of the Mountain West Conference.) |

== NJCAA ==
NJCAA member colleges in Colorado

| Team | School | City | Conference |
|---|---|---|---|
| CMC–Leadville Eagles | Colorado Mountain College–Leadville (Note: Only participates in cross-country running.) | Leadville | Independent (Region 9) |
| CMC–Steamboat Springs Eagles | Colorado Mountain College–Steamboat Springs (Note: Only participates in skiing.) | Steamboat Springs | Independent (Region 9) |
| Colorado Northwestern Spartans | Colorado Northwestern Community College | Rangely | Scenic West |
| Lamar Runnin' Lopes | Lamar Community College | Lamar | Colorado CC |
| Northeastern Plainsmen | Northeastern Junior College | Sterling | Colorado CC |
| Otero Rattlers | Otero College | La Junta | Colorado CC |
| Trinidad State Trojans | Trinidad State College | Trinidad | Colorado CC |

== See also ==
- List of NCAA Division I institutions
- List of NCAA Division II institutions
- List of NCAA Division III institutions
- List of NAIA institutions
- List of USCAA institutions
- List of NCCAA institutions
- List of NJCAA Division I institutions
- List of NJCAA Division II institutions
- List of NJCAA Division III institutions
