= List of college athletic programs in North Dakota =

This is a list of college athletic programs in the U.S. state of North Dakota.

Notes:

- This list is in a tabular format, with columns arranged in the following order, from left to right:
  - Athletic team description (short school name and nickname), with a link to the school's athletic program article if it exists. When only one nickname is listed, it is used for teams of both sexes. (Note that in recent years, many schools have chosen to use the same nickname for men's and women's teams even when the nickname is distinctly masculine.) When two nicknames are given, the first is used for men's teams and the other is used for women's teams. Different nicknames for a specific sport within a school are noted separately below the table.
  - Full name of school.
  - Location of school.
  - Conference of the school (if conference column is left blank, the school is either independent or the conference is unknown).
- Apart from the ongoing conversions, the following notes apply:
  - Following the normal standard of U.S. sports media, the terms "University" and "College" are ignored in alphabetization, unless necessary to distinguish schools (such as Boston College and Boston University) or are actually used by the media in normally describing the school, such as the College of Charleston.
  - Schools are also alphabetized by the names they are most commonly referred to by sports media, with non-intuitive examples included in parentheses next to the school name. This means, for example, that campuses bearing the name "University of North Carolina" may variously be found at "C" (Charlotte), "N" (North Carolina, referring to the Chapel Hill campus), and "U" (the Asheville, Greensboro, Pembroke, and Wilmington campuses, all normally referred to as UNC-{campus name}).
  - The prefix "St.", as in "Saint", is alphabetized as if it were spelled out.

== NCAA ==
=== Division I ===
Full NCAA Division I member colleges in North Dakota.
- FBS Football
- FCS Football

Team	School	City	Conference	Sport sponsorship								
Team	School	City	Conference	Football	Basketball		Baseball	Softball	Ice hockey		Soccer	
Team	School	City	Conference	Football	M	W	Baseball	Softball	M	W	M	W
North Dakota Fighting Hawks	University of North Dakota	Grand Forks	Summit	FCS (Note: North Dakota's football team competes in the Missouri Valley Football Conference and North Dakota State's football team competes in the Mountain West Conference.)	Yes	Yes	No	Yes	Yes (Note: North Dakota's men's ice hockey team competes in the National Collegiate Hockey Conference.)	No	No	Yes
North Dakota State Bison	North Dakota State University	Fargo	Summit	FBS	Yes	Yes	Yes	Yes	No	No	No	Yes

=== Division II ===
Full NCAA Division II member colleges in North Dakota.

Team	School	City	Conference	Sport sponsorship								
Team	School	City	Conference	Football	Basketball		Baseball	Softball	Ice Hockey		Soccer	
Team	School	City	Conference	Football	M	W	Baseball	Softball	M	W	M	W
Jamestown Jimmies	University of Jamestown	Jamestown	Northern Sun	Yes	Yes	Yes	Yes	Yes	No	No	Yes	Yes
Mary Marauders	University of Mary	Bismarck	Northern Sun	Yes	Yes	Yes	Yes	Yes	No	No	No	Yes
Minot State Beavers	Minot State University	Minot	Northern Sun	Yes	Yes	Yes	Yes	Yes	No	No	No	Yes

== NAIA ==
NAIA member colleges in North Dakota.

Team	School	City	Conference	Sport sponsorship						
Team	School	City	Conference	Football	Basketball		Baseball	Softball	Soccer	
Team	School	City	Conference	Football	M	W	Baseball	Softball	M	W
Bismarck State Mystics	Bismarck State College	Bismarck	Frontier	No (Note: Bismarck State has announced plans to revive its football program, which will begin play in the Frontier Conference in the 2027–2028 athletic season.)	Yes	Yes	Yes	No	No	No
Dickinson State Blue Hawks	Dickinson State University	Dickinson	Frontier	Yes	Yes	Yes	Yes	Yes	No	No
Mayville State Comets	Mayville State University	Mayville	Frontier	Yes	Yes	Yes	Yes	Yes	No	No
Valley City State Vikings	Valley City State University	Valley City	Frontier	Yes	Yes	Yes	Yes	Yes	No	No

== NJCAA ==
Team	School	City	Conference
Lake Region State Royals	Lake Region State College	Devils Lake	Mon-Dak
Dakota College Lumberjacks & Ladyjacks	Dakota College at Bottineau	Bottineau	Mon-Dak
NDSCS Wildcats	North Dakota State College of Science	Wahpeton	Mon-Dak
United Tribes Tech Thunderbirds	United Tribes Technical College	Bismarck	Mon-Dak
Williston State Teton Thunder	Williston State College	Williston	Mon-Dak

== NCCAA ==
Team	School	City	Conference
Trinity Bible Lions	Trinity Bible College	Ellendale	Independent

- Trinity Bible retired its football program after the 2019 season.

== See also ==
- List of NCAA Division I institutions
- List of NCAA Division II institutions
- List of NCAA Division III institutions
- List of NAIA institutions
- List of USCAA institutions
- List of NCCAA institutions
- List of NJCAA Division I institutions
- List of NJCAA Division II institutions
- List of NJCAA Division III institutions
