= List of college athletic programs in Mississippi =

This is a list of college athletic programs in the U.S. state of Mississippi.

== NCAA ==
=== Division I ===
Full NCAA Division I member colleges in Mississippi.
– FBS Football, – FCS Football

Team	School	City	Conference	Sport sponsorship						
Team	School	City	Conference	Foot- ball	Basketball		Base- ball	Soft- ball	Soccer	
Team	School	City	Conference	Foot- ball	M	W	Base- ball	Soft- ball	M	W
Alcorn State Braves and Lady Braves	Alcorn State University	Lorman	SWAC	FCS	Yes	Yes	Yes	Yes	No	Yes
Jackson State Tigers and Lady Tigers	Jackson State University	Jackson	SWAC	FCS	Yes	Yes	Yes	Yes	No	Yes
Ole Miss Rebels (Note: National media generally use "Mississippi" in score listings and on first reference, but will frequently use "Ole Miss" on later reference. The school athletic department prefers "Ole Miss".)	University of Mississippi	Oxford (Note: The University of Mississippi partially extends into the census-designated place of University, which is completely within the city of Oxford. The U.S. Postal Service considers University to be a separate entity from Oxford.)	SEC	FBS	Yes	Yes	Yes	Yes	No	Yes
Mississippi State Bulldogs	Mississippi State University	Mississippi State (Note: Mississippi State University is located within the census-designated place of Mississippi State, which encompasses the entire university campus. The campus does extend into the city limits of Starkville, but the U.S. Postal Service considers Mississippi State to be a separate entity.)	SEC	FBS	Yes	Yes	Yes	Yes	No	Yes
Mississippi Valley State Delta Devils and Devilettes	Mississippi Valley State University	Itta Bena	SWAC	FCS	Yes	Yes	Yes	Yes	No	No
Southern Miss Golden Eagles and Lady Eagles	The University of Southern Mississippi	Hattiesburg	Sun Belt	FBS	Yes	Yes	Yes	Yes	No	Yes

=== Division II ===
Full NCAA Division II member colleges in Mississippi.
- Football, - Non-Football

Team	School	City	Conference	Sport sponsorship						
Team	School	City	Conference	Foot- ball	Basketball		Base- ball	Soft- ball	Soccer	
Team	School	City	Conference	Foot- ball	M	W	Base- ball	Soft- ball	M	W
Delta State Statesmen and Lady Statesmen	Delta State University	Cleveland	Gulf South	Yes	Yes	Yes	Yes	Yes	Yes	Yes
Mississippi Christian Choctaws	Mississippi Christian University	Clinton	Gulf South	No	Yes	Yes	Yes	Yes	Yes	Yes

=== Division III ===
Full NCAA Division III member colleges in Mississippi.
- Football, - Non-Football

Team	School	City	Conference	Sport sponsorship						
Team	School	City	Conference	Foot- ball	Basketball		Base- ball	Soft- ball	Soccer	
Team	School	City	Conference	Foot- ball	M	W	Base- ball	Soft- ball	M	W
Belhaven Blazers	Belhaven University	Jackson	CCS	Yes (Note: Belhaven's football team competes in USA South.)	Yes	Yes	Yes	Yes	Yes	Yes
Millsaps Majors	Millsaps College	Jackson	SAA	Yes	Yes	Yes	Yes	Yes	Yes	Yes
MUW Owls	Mississippi University for Women	Columbus	SLIAC	No	Yes	Yes	Yes	Yes	Yes	Yes

== NAIA ==
Full NAIA member colleges in Mississippi.
- Non-Football

Team	School	City	Conference	Sport sponsorship					
Team	School	City	Conference	Basketball		Base- ball	Soft- ball	Soccer	
Team	School	City	Conference	M	W	Base- ball	Soft- ball	M	W
Blue Mountain Toppers	Blue Mountain Christian University	Blue Mountain	Southern States	Yes	Yes	Yes	Yes	Yes	Yes
Rust Bearcats	Rust College	Holly Springs	HBCU	Yes	Yes	Yes (Note: Rust and Tougaloo's baseball teams compete as independents.)	Yes (Note: Rust's softball team competes as an independent.)	No	No
Tougaloo Bulldogs	Tougaloo College	Tougaloo	HBCU	Yes	Yes	Yes	No	No	No
William Carey Crusaders	William Carey University	Hattiesburg	Southern States	Yes	Yes	Yes	Yes	Yes	Yes

== NJCAA ==
Full NJCAA member colleges in Mississippi.
- Football, - Non-Football

Team	School	City	Conference
Coahoma Tigers	Coahoma Community College	Clarksdale	Mississippi C&JC
Copiah-Lincoln Wolves	Copiah-Lincoln Community College	Wesson	Mississippi C&JC
East Central Warriors	East Central Community College	Decatur	Mississippi C&JC
East Mississippi Lions	East Mississippi Community College	Scooba	Mississippi C&JC
Hinds Eagles	Hinds Community College	Raymond	Mississippi C&JC
Holmes Bulldogs	Holmes Community College	Goodman	Mississippi C&JC
Itawamba Indians	Itawamba Community College	Fulton	Mississippi C&JC
Jones County Bobcats	Jones County Junior College	Ellisville	Mississippi C&JC
Meridian Eagles	Meridian Community College	Meridian	Independent
Mississippi Delta Trojans	Mississippi Delta Community College	Moorhead	Mississippi C&JC
Mississippi Gulf Coast Bulldogs	Mississippi Gulf Coast Community College	Perkinston	Mississippi C&JC
Northeast Mississippi Tigers	Northeast Mississippi Community College	Booneville	Mississippi C&JC
Northwest Mississippi Rangers	Northwest Mississippi Community College	Senatobia	Mississippi C&JC
Pearl River Wildcats	Pearl River Community College	Poplarville	Mississippi C&JC
Southwest Mississippi Bears	Southwest Mississippi Community College	Summit	Mississippi C&JC

== See also ==
- List of NCAA Division I institutions
- List of NCAA Division II institutions
- List of NCAA Division III institutions
- List of NAIA institutions
- List of USCAA institutions
- List of NCCAA institutions
- List of NJCAA Division I institutions
- List of NJCAA Division II institutions
- List of NJCAA Division III institutions
