= List of college athletic programs in Connecticut =

This is a list of college athletic programs in the U.S. state of Connecticut.

== NCAA ==
=== Division I ===
Full NCAA Division I member colleges in Connecticut.
– FBS Football, – FCS Football, – Non-Football

Team	School	City	Conference	Sport sponsorship								
Team	School	City	Conference	Foot- ball	Basketball		Base- ball	Soft- ball	Ice hockey		Soccer	
Team	School	City	Conference	Foot- ball	M	W	Base- ball	Soft- ball	M	W	M	W
Central Connecticut Blue Devils	Central Connecticut State University	New Britain	NEC	FCS	Yes	Yes	Yes	Yes	No	No	Yes	Yes
Connecticut Huskies (Note: While national media use "Connecticut" in score listings and standings, the short form of "UConn" is widely used as well.)	University of Connecticut	Storrs	Big East	FBS (Note: Connecticut's football team competes as an independent.)	Yes	Yes	Yes	Yes	Yes (Note: Connecticut's ice hockey teams compete in Hockey East.)	Yes	Yes	Yes
Fairfield Stags	Fairfield University	Fairfield	Metro	No	Yes	Yes	Yes	Yes	No	No	Yes	Yes
New Haven Chargers	University of New Haven	West Haven	NEC	FCS	Yes	Yes	Yes	Yes	No	No	Yes	Yes
Quinnipiac Bobcats	Quinnipiac University	Hamden	Metro	No	Yes	Yes	Yes	Yes	Yes (Note: Quinnipiac and Yale's men's and women's ice hockey teams all compete in ECAC Hockey.)	Yes	Yes	Yes
Sacred Heart Pioneers	Sacred Heart University	Fairfield	Metro	FCS (Note: Sacred Heart's football team competes as an independent.)	Yes	Yes	Yes	Yes	Yes (Note: Sacred Heart's men's ice hockey team competes in Atlantic Hockey America.)	Yes (Note: Sacred Heart's women's ice hockey team competes in the New England Women's Hockey Alliance.)	Yes	Yes
Yale Bulldogs	Yale University	New Haven	Ivy League	FCS	Yes	Yes	Yes	Yes	Yes	Yes	Yes	Yes

=== Division II ===
Full NCAA Division II member colleges in Connecticut.
– Football, – Non-Football

Team	School	City	Conference	Sport sponsorship								
Team	School	City	Conference	Foot- ball	Basketball		Base- ball	Soft- ball	Ice hockey		Soccer	
Team	School	City	Conference	Foot- ball	M	W	Base- ball	Soft- ball	M	W	M	W
Bridgeport Purple Knights	University of Bridgeport	Bridgeport	Central Atlantic	No	Yes	Yes	Yes	Yes	No	No	Yes	Yes
Post Eagles	Post University	Waterbury	Central Atlantic	Yes (Note: Post's football team competes in the Northeast-10 Conference as an affiliate.)	Yes	Yes	Yes	Yes	Yes (Note: Post's men's ice hockey team competes as an affiliate in the Northeast-10 Conference.)	Yes (Note: Post's women's ice hockey team competes in Division I as a member of the New England Women's Hockey Alliance.)	Yes	Yes
Southern Connecticut Owls	Southern Connecticut State University	New Haven	Northeast-10	Yes	Yes	Yes	Yes	Yes	No	No	Yes	Yes

=== Division III ===
Full NCAA Division III member colleges in Connecticut.
– Football, – Non-football

Team	School	City	Conference	Sport sponsorship								
Team	School	City	Conference	Foot- ball	Basketball		Base- ball	Soft- ball	Ice hockey		Soccer	
Team	School	City	Conference	Foot- ball	M	W	Base- ball	Soft- ball	M	W	M	W
Albertus Magnus Falcons	Albertus Magnus College	New Haven	Great Northeast	No	Yes	Yes	Yes	Yes	Yes (Note: Albertus Magnus's men's ice hockey team competes as an independent.)	Yes (Note: Albertus Magnus;s women's ice hockey team competes in the NCHA.)	Yes	Yes
Coast Guard Bears	United States Coast Guard Academy	New London	NEWMAC	Yes	Yes	Yes	Yes	Yes	No	No	Yes	Yes
Connecticut College Camels	Connecticut College	New London	NESCAC	No	Yes	Yes	No	No	Yes	Yes	Yes	Yes
Eastern Connecticut Warriors	Eastern Connecticut State University	Willimantic	Little East	No	Yes	Yes	Yes	Yes	No	No	Yes	Yes
Hartford Hawks	University of Hartford	West Hartford	Conference of New England	No	Yes	Yes	Yes	Yes	No	No	Yes	Yes
Mitchell Mariners	Mitchell College	New London	Great Northeast	No	Yes	Yes	Yes	Yes	No	No	Yes	Yes
Saint Joseph Blue Jays	University of Saint Joseph	West Hartford	Great Northeast	No	Yes	Yes	Yes	Yes	No	No	Yes	Yes
Trinity Bantams	Trinity College	Hartford	NESCAC	Yes	Yes	Yes	Yes	Yes	Yes	Yes	Yes	Yes
Wesleyan Cardinals	Wesleyan University	Middletown	NESCAC	Yes	Yes	Yes	Yes	Yes	Yes	Yes	Yes	Yes
Western Connecticut Wolves	Western Connecticut State University	Danbury	Little East	Yes (Note: Western Connecticut's football team competes in the Massachusetts State Collegiate Athletic Conference.)	Yes	Yes	Yes	Yes	Yes	Yes	Yes	Yes

== NJCAA ==
Team	School	City	Conference
Gateway Lions	Gateway Community College	New Haven	Massachusetts CC
UConn–Avery Point Pointers	University of Connecticut at Avery Point	Groton	Massachusetts CC

== See also ==
- List of NCAA Division I institutions
- List of NCAA Division II institutions
- List of NCAA Division III institutions
- List of NAIA institutions
- List of USCAA institutions
- List of NCCAA institutions
- List of NJCAA Division I institutions
- List of NJCAA Division II institutions
- List of NJCAA Division III institutions
