= List of college athletic programs in Wyoming =

This is a list of college athletic programs in the U.S. state of Wyoming.

== NCAA ==
=== Division I ===
NCAA Division I member colleges in Wyoming.

Team	School	City	Conference	Sport sponsorship								
Team	School	City	Conference	Football	Basketball		Baseball	Softball	Ice Hockey		Soccer	
Team	School	City	Conference	Football	M	W	Baseball	Softball	M	W	M	W
Wyoming Cowboys and Cowgirls	University of Wyoming	Laramie	Mountain West	FBS	Yes	Yes	No	No	No	No	No	Yes

== NJCAA ==
NJCAA member colleges in Wyoming.
- Member location

Team	School	City	Conference
Casper Thunderbirds	Casper College	Casper	Wyoming CC
Central Wyoming Rustlers	Central Wyoming College	Riverton	Wyoming CC
Eastern Wyoming Lancers	Eastern Wyoming College	Torrington	Wyoming CC
Gillette Pronghorns	Gillette College	Gillette	Wyoming CC
Laramie County Golden Eagles	Laramie County Community College	Cheyenne	Wyoming CC
Northwest Trappers	Northwest College	Powell	Wyoming CC
Sheridan Generals	Sheridan College	Sheridan	Wyoming CC
Western Wyoming Mustangs	Western Wyoming Community College	Rock Springs	Wyoming CC

== See also ==
- List of NCAA Division I institutions
- List of NCAA Division II institutions
- List of NCAA Division III institutions
- List of NAIA institutions
- List of USCAA institutions
- List of NCCAA institutions
- List of NJCAA Division I institutions
- List of NJCAA Division II institutions
- List of NJCAA Division III institutions
