= List of college athletic programs in Oregon =

This is a list of college athletic programs in the U.S. state of Oregon.

Notes:

- This list is in a tabular format, with columns arranged in the following order, from left to right:
  - Athletic team description (short school name and nickname), with a link to the school's athletic program article if it exists. When only one nickname is listed, it is used for teams of both sexes. (Note that in recent years, many schools have chosen to use the same nickname for men's and women's teams even when the nickname is distinctly masculine.) When two nicknames are given, the first is used for men's teams and the other is used for women's teams. Different nicknames for a specific sport within a school are noted separately below the table.
  - Full name of school.
  - Location of school.
  - Conference of the school (if conference column is left blank, the school is either independent or the conference is unknown).
- Apart from the ongoing conversions, the following notes apply:
  - Following the normal standard of U.S. sports media, the terms "University" and "College" are ignored in alphabetization, unless necessary to distinguish schools (such as Boston College and Boston University) or are actually used by the media in normally describing the school, such as the College of Charleston.
  - Schools are also alphabetized by the names they are most commonly referred to by sports media, with non-intuitive examples included in parentheses next to the school name. This means, for example, that campuses bearing the name "University of North Carolina" may variously be found at "C" (Charlotte), "N" (North Carolina, referring to the Chapel Hill campus), and "U" (the Asheville, Greensboro, Pembroke, and Wilmington campuses, all normally referred to as UNC-{campus name}).
  - The prefix "St.", as in "Saint", is alphabetized as if it were spelled out.

== NCAA ==
=== Division I ===
Full NCAA Division I member colleges in Oregon
– FBS Football, – FCS Football, – Non-football

Team	School	City	Conference	Sport sponsorship						
Team	School	City	Conference	Foot- ball	Basketball		Base- ball	Soft- ball	Soccer	
Team	School	City	Conference	Foot- ball	M	W	Base- ball	Soft- ball	M	W
Oregon Ducks	University of Oregon	Eugene	Big Ten	FBS	Yes	Yes	Yes	Yes	No	Yes
Oregon State Beavers	Oregon State University	Corvallis	Pac-12	FBS	Yes	Yes	Yes	Yes	Yes	Yes
Portland Pilots	University of Portland	Portland	West Coast	No	Yes	Yes	Yes	No	Yes	Yes
Portland State Vikings	Portland State University	Portland	Big Sky	FCS	Yes	Yes	No	Yes	No	Yes

=== Division II ===
Team	School	City	Conference	Sport sponsorship						
Team	School	City	Conference	Foot- ball	Basketball		Base- ball	Soft- ball	Soccer	
Team	School	City	Conference	Foot- ball	M	W	Base- ball	Soft- ball	M	W
Western Oregon Wolves	Western Oregon University	Monmouth	Great Northwest	Yes (Note: Western Oregon's football team competes in the Lone Star Conference.)	Yes	Yes	Yes	Yes	Yes	Yes

=== Division III ===
Full NCAA Division III member colleges in Oregon
– Member location

Team	School	City	Conference	Sport sponsorship						
Team	School	City	Conference	Foot- ball	Basketball		Base- ball	Soft- ball	Soccer	
Team	School	City	Conference	Foot- ball	M	W	Base- ball	Soft- ball	M	W
George Fox Bruins	George Fox University	Newberg	Northwest	Yes	Yes	Yes	Yes	Yes	Yes	Yes
Lewis & Clark Pioneers	Lewis & Clark College	Portland	Northwest	Yes	Yes	Yes	Yes	Yes	No	Yes
Linfield Wildcats	Linfield University	McMinnville	Northwest	Yes	Yes	Yes	Yes	Yes	Yes	Yes
Pacific Boxers	Pacific University	Forest Grove	Northwest	Yes	Yes	Yes	Yes	Yes	Yes	Yes
Willamette Bearcats	Willamette University	Salem	Northwest	Yes	Yes	Yes	Yes	Yes	Yes	Yes

== NAIA ==
Map of NAIA member colleges in Oregon
– Football member, – Non-football member

Team	School	City	Conference	Sport sponsorship						
Team	School	City	Conference	Foot- ball	Basketball		Base- ball	Soft- ball	Soccer	
Team	School	City	Conference	Foot- ball	M	W	Base- ball	Soft- ball	M	W
Bushnell Beacons	Bushnell University	Eugene	Cascade	No	Yes	Yes	Yes	Yes	Yes	Yes
Corban Warriors	Corban University	Salem	Cascade	No	Yes	Yes	Yes	Yes	Yes	Yes
Eastern Oregon Mountaineers	Eastern Oregon University	La Grande	Cascade	Yes (Note: Eastern Oregon and Southern Oregon's football teams compete in the Frontier Conference.)	Yes	Yes	Yes	Yes	Yes	Yes
Oregon Tech Hustlin' Owls	Oregon Institute of Technology	Klamath Falls	Cascade	No	Yes	Yes	Yes	Yes	Yes	Yes
Southern Oregon Raiders	Southern Oregon University	Ashland	Cascade	Yes	Yes	Yes	No	Yes	Yes	Yes
Warner Pacific Knights	Warner Pacific University	Portland	Cascade	No	Yes	Yes	No	Yes	Yes	Yes

== NCCAA ==
Team	School	City	Conference
New Hope Christian Deacons	New Hope Christian College	Eugene	Independent
Portland Bible College Wildcats	Portland Bible College	Portland	Division 2-West

== NWAC ==
Team	School	City	Conference
Blue Mountain Timberwolves	Blue Mountain Community College	Pendleton	Northwest CC-Eastern
Chemeketa Storm	Chemeketa Community College	Salem	Northwest CC-Southern
Clackamas Cougars	Clackamas Community College	Oregon City	Northwest CC-Southern
Lane Titans	Lane Community College	Eugene	Northwest CC-Southern
Linn-Benton Roadrunners	Linn-Benton Community College	Albany	Northwest CC-Southern
Mt. Hood Saints	Mt. Hood Community College	Gresham	Northwest CC-Southern
Portland Panthers	Portland Community College	Portland	Northwest CC-Southern
Rogue Ospreys	Rogue Community College	Grants Pass	Northwest CC-Southern
Southwestern Oregon Lakers	Southwestern Oregon Community College	Coos Bay	Northwest CC-Southern
Treasure Valley Chukars	Treasure Valley Community College	Ontario	Northwest CC-Eastern
Umpqua Riverhawks	Umpqua Community College	Roseburg	Northwest CC-Southern

== See also ==
- List of NCAA Division I institutions
- List of NCAA Division II institutions
- List of NCAA Division III institutions
- List of NAIA institutions
- List of USCAA institutions
- List of NCCAA institutions
