= List of college athletic programs in Virginia =

This is a list of college athletic programs in the U.S. state of Virginia.

== NCAA ==
=== Division I ===
Full NCAA Division I member colleges in Virginia.
– FBS Football, – FCS Football, – Non-football

Team	School	City	Conference	Sport sponsorship						
Team	School	City	Conference	Foot- ball	Basketball		Base- ball	Soft- ball	Soccer	
Team	School	City	Conference	Foot- ball	M	W	Base- ball	Soft- ball	M	W
George Mason Patriots	George Mason University	Fairfax	Atlantic 10	No	Yes	Yes	Yes	Yes	Yes	Yes
Hampton Pirates and Lady Pirates	Hampton University	Hampton	CAA	FCS (Note: Hampton and William & Mary's football teams both compete in CAA Football, the technically separate football league operated by the all-sports CAA.)	Yes	Yes	No	Yes	No	Yes
James Madison Dukes	James Madison University	Harrisonburg	Sun Belt	FBS	Yes	Yes	Yes	Yes	Yes	Yes
Liberty Flames and Lady Flames	Liberty University	Lynchburg	C-USA	FBS	Yes	Yes	Yes	Yes	Yes (Note: Liberty's men's soccer team competes in the Ohio Valley Conference.)	Yes
Longwood Lancers	Longwood University	Farmville	Big South	No	Yes	Yes	Yes	Yes	Yes	Yes
Norfolk State Spartans	Norfolk State University	Norfolk	MEAC	FCS	Yes	Yes	Yes (Note: Norfolk State's baseball team competes as a member of the Northeast Conference.)	Yes	No	No
Old Dominion Monarchs	Old Dominion University	Norfolk	Sun Belt	FBS	Yes	Yes	Yes	No	Yes	Yes
Radford Highlanders	Radford University	Radford	Big South	No	Yes	Yes	Yes	Yes	Yes	Yes
Richmond Spiders	University of Richmond	Richmond	Atlantic 10	FCS (Note: Richmond's football team competes in the Patriot League.)	Yes	Yes	Yes	No	No	Yes
VCU Rams	Virginia Commonwealth University	Richmond	Atlantic 10	No	Yes	Yes	Yes	No	Yes	Yes
Virginia Cavaliers	University of Virginia	Charlottesville	ACC	FBS	Yes	Yes	Yes	Yes	Yes	Yes
VMI Keydets	Virginia Military Institute	Lexington	Southern	FCS	Yes	No	Yes	No	Yes	Yes
Virginia Tech Hokies	Virginia Polytechnic Institute and State University (Note: The university prefers the shortened name "Virginia Tech" over its legal name for both athletic and non-athletic purposes.)	Blacksburg	ACC	FBS	Yes	Yes	Yes	Yes	Yes	Yes
William & Mary Tribe	College of William & Mary	Williamsburg	CAA	FCS	Yes	Yes	Yes	No	Yes	Yes

=== Division II ===
Full NCAA Division II member colleges in Virginia.

Team	School	City	Conference	Sport sponsorship						
Team	School	City	Conference	Foot- ball	Basketball		Base- ball	Soft- ball	Soccer	
Team	School	City	Conference	Foot- ball	M	W	Base- ball	Soft- ball	M	W
Emory and Henry Wasps	Emory and Henry University	Emory	SAC	Yes	Yes	Yes	Yes	Yes	Yes	Yes
Ferrum Panthers	Ferrum College	Ferrum	Carolinas	Yes	Yes	Yes	Yes	Yes	Yes	Yes
Virginia State Trojans	Virginia State University	Ettrick	CIAA	Yes	Yes	Yes	Yes (Note: Virginia State's baseball team competes as an independent.)	Yes	No	No
Virginia Union Panthers	Virginia Union University	Richmond	CIAA	Yes	Yes	Yes	No	Yes	No	No
UVA Wise Cavaliers	University of Virginia's College at Wise	Wise	SAC	Yes	Yes	Yes	Yes	Yes	No	No

=== Division III ===
Team	School	City	Conference	Sport sponsorship						
Team	School	City	Conference	Foot- ball	Basketball		Base- ball	Soft- ball	Soccer	
Team	School	City	Conference	Foot- ball	M	W	Base- ball	Soft- ball	M	W
Averett Cougars	Averett University	Danville	Old Dominion	Yes	Yes	Yes	Yes	Yes	Yes	Yes
Batten Marlins	Batten University	Virginia Beach	Old Dominion	No	Yes	Yes	Yes	Yes	Yes	Yes
Bridgewater Eagles	Bridgewater College	Bridgewater	Old Dominion	Yes	Yes	Yes	Yes	Yes	Yes	Yes
Christopher Newport Captains	Christopher Newport University	Newport News	Coast to Coast	Yes (Note: Christopher Newport's football team competes in the New Jersey Athletic Conference.)	Yes	Yes	Yes	Yes	Yes	Yes
Eastern Mennonite Royals	Eastern Mennonite University	Harrisonburg	Old Dominion	No	Yes	Yes	Yes	Yes	Yes	Yes
Hampden–Sydney Tigers	Hampden–Sydney College	Hampden Sydney	Old Dominion	Yes	Yes	No	Yes	No	Yes	No
Hollins (Note: Hollins does not have an official mascot, and the university's athletic programs do not have official nicknames.)	Hollins University	Hollins	Old Dominion	No	No	Yes	No	No	No	Yes
Lynchburg Hornets	University of Lynchburg	Lynchburg	Old Dominion	No	Yes	Yes	Yes	Yes	Yes	Yes
Mary Baldwin Fighting Squirrels	Mary Baldwin University	Staunton	USA South	No	Yes	Yes	Yes	Yes	Yes	Yes
Mary Washington Eagles	University of Mary Washington	Fredericksburg	Coast to Coast	No	Yes	Yes	Yes	Yes	Yes	Yes
Marymount Saints	Marymount University	Arlington	Atlantic East	(Note: Marymount fields a women's flag football team.)	Yes	Yes	Yes	No	Yes	Yes
Randolph WildCats	Randolph College	Lynchburg	Old Dominion	No	Yes	Yes	No	Yes	Yes	Yes
Randolph–Macon Yellow Jackets	Randolph–Macon College	Ashland	Old Dominion	Yes	Yes	Yes	Yes	Yes	Yes	Yes
Roanoke Maroons	Roanoke College	Salem	Old Dominion	Yes	Yes	Yes	Yes	Yes	Yes	Yes
Shenandoah Hornets	Shenandoah University	Winchester	Old Dominion	Yes	Yes	Yes	Yes	Yes	Yes	Yes
Southern Virginia Knights	Southern Virginia University	Buena Vista	USA South	Yes (Note: Southern Virginia's football team competes in the Old Dominion Athletic Conference.)	Yes	Yes	Yes	Yes	Yes	Yes
Sweet Briar Vixens	Sweet Briar College	Sweet Briar	Old Dominion	No	No	No	No	No	No	Yes
Washington and Lee Generals	Washington and Lee University	Lexington	Old Dominion	Yes	Yes	Yes	Yes	No	Yes	Yes

== NAIA ==
Team	School	City	Conference	Sport sponsorship						
Team	School	City	Conference	Foot- ball	Basketball		Base- ball	Soft- ball	Soccer	
Team	School	City	Conference	Foot- ball	M	W	Base- ball	Soft- ball	M	W
Bluefield Rams	Bluefield University	Bluefield	Appalachian Athletic	Yes	Yes	Yes	Yes	Yes	Yes	Yes

== NJCAA ==
Team	School	City	Conference
Bryant & Stratton Bobcats	Bryant & Stratton College	Virginia Beach	Region X
Mountain Gateway Roadrunners	Mountain Gateway Community College	Clifton Forge	Region X
Patrick & Henry Patriots	Patrick & Henry Community College	Martinsville	Region X
Paul D. Camp Hurricanes	Paul D. Camp Community College	Franklin	Region X
Richard Bland Statesmen	Richard Bland College	Prince George	Region X
Southside Virginia Panthers	Southside Virginia Community College	Alberta	Region X
Southwest Virginia Flying Eagles	Southwest Virginia Community College	Cedar Bluff	Region X

== USCAA ==
Team	School	City	Conference
The Apprentice Builders	The Apprentice School	Newport News	
Christendom Crusaders	Christendom College	Front Royal	
Regent Royals	Regent University	Virginia Beach	
Virginia University of Lynchburg Dragons	Virginia University of Lynchburg	Lynchburg	

== Independent ==
Team	School	City
Patrick Henry Sentinels and Lady Sentinels	Patrick Henry College	Purcellville

== See also ==
- List of NCAA Division I institutions
- List of NCAA Division II institutions
- List of NCAA Division III institutions
- List of NAIA institutions
- List of USCAA institutions
- List of NCCAA institutions
- List of NJCAA Division I institutions
- List of NJCAA Division II institutions
- List of NJCAA Division III institutions
