= List of college athletic programs in Iowa =

This is a list of college athletic programs in the U.S. state of Iowa.

== NCAA ==
=== Division I ===
Full NCAA Division I member colleges in Iowa.
– FBS Football, – FCS Football

Team	School	City	Conference	Sport sponsorship								
Team	School	City	Conference	Foot- ball	Basketball		Base- ball	Soft- ball	Ice hockey		Soccer	
Team	School	City	Conference	Foot- ball	M	W	Base- ball	Soft- ball	M	W	M	W
Drake Bulldogs	Drake University	Des Moines	Missouri Valley	FCS (Note: Drake's football team competes in the Pioneer Football League.)	Yes	Yes	No	Yes	No	No	Yes	Yes
Iowa Hawkeyes	University of Iowa	Iowa City	Big Ten	FBS	Yes	Yes	Yes	Yes	No	No	No	Yes
Iowa State Cyclones	Iowa State University	Ames	Big 12	FBS	Yes	Yes	No	Yes	No	No	No	Yes
Northern Iowa Panthers	University of Northern Iowa	Cedar Falls	Missouri Valley	FCS (Note: Northern Iowa's football team competes in the Missouri Valley Football Conference.)	Yes	Yes	No	Yes	No	No	No	Yes

=== Division II ===
Full NCAA Division II member colleges in Iowa.

Team	School	City	Conference	Sport sponsorship								
Team	School	City	Conference	Foot- ball	Basketball		Base- ball	Soft- ball	Ice hockey		Soccer	
Team	School	City	Conference	Foot- ball	M	W	Base- ball	Soft- ball	M	W	M	W
Upper Iowa Peacocks	Upper Iowa University	Fayette	Great Lakes Valley	Yes	Yes	Yes	Yes	Yes	No	No	Yes	Yes

=== Division III ===
Full NCAA Division III member colleges in Iowa.

Team	School	City	Conference	Sport sponsorship								
Team	School	City	Conference	Foot- ball	Basketball		Base- ball	Soft- ball	Ice hockey		Soccer	
Team	School	City	Conference	Foot- ball	M	W	Base- ball	Soft- ball	M	W	M	W
Buena Vista Beavers	Buena Vista University	Storm Lake	American Rivers	Yes	Yes	Yes	Yes	Yes	No	No	Yes	Yes
Central Dutch	Central College	Pella	American Rivers	Yes	Yes	Yes	Yes	Yes	No	No	Yes	Yes
Coe Kohawks	Coe College	Cedar Rapids	American Rivers	Yes	Yes	Yes	Yes	Yes	No	No	Yes	Yes
Cornell Rams	Cornell College	Mount Vernon	Midwest	Yes	Yes	Yes	Yes	Yes	No	No	Yes	Yes
Dubuque Spartans	University of Dubuque	Dubuque	American Rivers	Yes	Yes	Yes	Yes	Yes	Yes (Note: University of Dubuque men's ice hockey team competes in the Northern Collegiate Hockey Association (NCHA).)	Yes (Note: University of Dubuque women's ice hockey team competes in the Northern Collegiate Hockey Association (NCHA).)	Yes	Yes
Grinnell Pioneers	Grinnell College	Grinnell	Midwest	Yes	Yes	Yes	Yes	Yes	No	No	Yes	Yes
Loras Duhawks	Loras College	Dubuque	American Rivers	Yes	Yes	Yes	Yes	Yes	No	No	Yes	Yes
Luther Norse	Luther College	Decorah	American Rivers	Yes	Yes	Yes	Yes	Yes	No	No	Yes	Yes
Simpson Storm	Simpson College	Indianola	American Rivers	Yes	Yes	Yes	Yes	Yes	No	No	Yes	Yes
Wartburg Knights	Wartburg College	Waverly	American Rivers	Yes	Yes	Yes	Yes	Yes	No	No	Yes	Yes

== NAIA ==
Full NAIA member colleges in Iowa.

Team	School	City	Conference	Sport sponsorship						
Team	School	City	Conference	Foot- ball	Basketball		Base- ball	Soft- ball	Soccer	
Team	School	City	Conference	Foot- ball	M	W	Base- ball	Soft- ball	M	W
Briar Cliff Chargers	Briar Cliff University	Sioux City	Great Plains	Yes	Yes	Yes	Yes	Yes	Yes	Yes
Clarke Pride	Clarke University	Dubuque	Heart of America	Yes	Yes	Yes	Yes	Yes	Yes	Yes
Dordt Defenders	Dordt University	Sioux Center	Great Plains	Yes	Yes	Yes	Yes	Yes	Yes	Yes
Graceland Yellowjackets	Graceland University	Lamoni	Heart of America	Yes (Note: Graceland additionally sponsors flag football as a women's varsity sport and competes in the Kansas Collegiate Athletic Conference.)	Yes	Yes	Yes	Yes	Yes	Yes
Grand View Vikings	Grand View University	Des Moines	Heart of America	Yes	Yes	Yes	Yes	Yes	Yes	Yes
Morningside Mustangs	Morningside University	Sioux City	Great Plains	Yes	Yes	Yes	Yes	Yes	Yes	Yes
Mount Mercy Mustangs	Mount Mercy University	Cedar Rapids	Heart of America	No	Yes	Yes	Yes	Yes	Yes	Yes
Northwestern Red Raiders	Northwestern College	Orange City	Great Plains	Yes	Yes	Yes	Yes	Yes	Yes	Yes
St. Ambrose Fighting Bees	St. Ambrose University	Davenport	Heart of America	Yes	Yes	Yes	Yes	Yes	Yes	Yes
Waldorf Warriors	Waldorf University	Forest City	Great Plains	Yes	Yes	Yes	Yes	Yes	Yes (Note: Waldorf's soccer teams compete as independents.)	Yes
William Penn Statesmen	William Penn University	Oskaloosa	Heart of America	Yes	Yes	Yes	Yes	Yes	Yes	Yes

== NJCAA ==
Team	School	City	Conference
Des Moines Area Bears	Des Moines Area Community College	Boone‡	Iowa CC
Ellsworth Panthers	Ellsworth Community College	Iowa Falls	Iowa CC
Hawkeye Redtails	Hawkeye Community College	Waterloo	Iowa CC
Indian Hills-Centerville Falcons	Indian Hills Community College	Centerville	Iowa CC
Indian Hills-Ottumwa Warriors	Indian Hills Community College	Ottumwa	Iowa CC
Iowa Central Tritons	Iowa Central Community College	Fort Dodge	Iowa CC
Iowa Lakes Lakers	Iowa Lakes Community College	Estherville	Iowa CC
Iowa Western Reivers	Iowa Western Community College	Council Bluffs	Iowa CC
Kirkwood Eagles	Kirkwood Community College	Cedar Rapids	Iowa CC
Marshalltown Tigers	Marshalltown Community College	Marshalltown	Iowa CC
Muscatine Cardinals	Muscatine Community College	Muscatine†	Iowa CC
Northeast Iowa Cougars	Northeast Iowa Community College	Calmar	Iowa CC
North Iowa Area Trojans	North Iowa Area Community College	Mason City	Iowa CC
Northwest Iowa Thunder	Northwest Iowa Community College	Sheldon	Iowa CC
Scott Screaming Eagles	Scott Community College	Bettendorf†	Iowa CC
Southeastern Black Hawks	Southeastern Community College	West Burlington	Iowa CC
Southwestern Spartans	Southwestern Community College	Creston	Iowa CC
Western Iowa Tech Comets	Western Iowa Tech Community College	Sioux City	Iowa CC

† Eastern Iowa Community College District - Clinton (volleyball, men's basketball only), Muscatine (baseball, softball), Scott (golf, soccer only).
‡ All seven DMACC campuses (Ankeny, Boone, Carroll, Des Moines, Newton, Urban [Des Moines] & West Des Moines campuses) play at Boone.

== NCCAA ==
Team	School	City	Conference
Emmaus Eagles	Emmaus University	Dubuque	Independent
Faith Baptist Eagles	Faith Baptist Bible College	Ankeny	Independent

== USCAA ==
Team	School	City	Conference
Maharishi International Pioneers	Maharishi International University	Fairfield	Independent

== See also ==
- List of NCAA Division I institutions
- List of NCAA Division II institutions
- List of NCAA Division III institutions
- List of NAIA institutions
- List of USCAA institutions
- List of NCCAA institutions
- List of NJCAA Division I institutions
- List of NJCAA Division II institutions
- List of NJCAA Division III institutions
