= List of college athletic programs in New Hampshire =

This is a list of college athletic programs in the U.S. state of New Hampshire.

Notes:

- This list is in a tabular format, with columns arranged in the following order, from left to right:
  - Athletic team description (short school name and nickname), with a link to the school's athletic program article if it exists. When only one nickname is listed, it is used for teams of both sexes. (Note that in recent years, many schools have chosen to use the same nickname for men's and women's teams even when the nickname is distinctly masculine.) When two nicknames are given, the first is used for men's teams and the other is used for women's teams. Different nicknames for a specific sport within a school are noted separately below the table.
  - Full name of school.
  - Location of school.
  - Conference of the school (if conference column is left blank, the school is either independent or the conference is unknown).
- Apart from the ongoing conversions, the following notes apply:
  - Following the normal standard of U.S. sports media, the terms "University" and "College" are ignored in alphabetization, unless necessary to distinguish schools (such as Boston College and Boston University) or are actually used by the media in normally describing the school, such as the College of Charleston.
  - Schools are also alphabetized by the names they are most commonly referred to by sports media, with non-intuitive examples included in parentheses next to the school name. This means, for example, that campuses bearing the name "University of North Carolina" may variously be found at "C" (Charlotte), "N" (North Carolina, referring to the Chapel Hill campus), and "U" (the Asheville, Greensboro, Pembroke, and Wilmington campuses, all normally referred to as UNC-{campus name}).
  - The prefix "St.", as in "Saint", is alphabetized as if it were spelled out.

== NCAA ==
=== Division I ===
Full NCAA Division I member colleges in New Hampshire.
– FCS Football

| Team | School | City | Conference | Sport sponsorship | | | | | | | | |
| Team | School | City | Conference | Foot- ball | Basketball | | Base- ball | Soft- ball | Ice hockey | | Soccer | |
| Team | School | City | Conference | Foot- ball | M | W | Base- ball | Soft- ball | M | W | M | W |
|---|---|---|---|---|---|---|---|---|---|---|---|---|
| Dartmouth Big Green | Dartmouth College | Hanover | Ivy League | FCS | Yes | Yes | Yes | Yes | Yes (Note: Dartmouth's ice hockey teams compete in ECAC Hockey.) | Yes | Yes | Yes |
| New Hampshire Wildcats | University of New Hampshire | Durham | America East | FCS (Note: New Hampshire's football team competes in CAA Football, the technically separate football league operated by the all-sports Coastal Athletic Association.) | Yes | Yes | No | No | Yes (Note: New Hampshire's ice hockey teams compete in Hockey East.) | Yes | Yes | Yes |

=== Division II ===
Full NCAA Division II member colleges in New Hampshire.
– Football member, – Non-football member

| Team | School | City | Conference | Sport sponsorship | | | | | | | | |
| Team | School | City | Conference | Foot- ball | Basketball | | Base- ball | Soft- ball | Ice hockey | | Soccer | |
| Team | School | City | Conference | Foot- ball | M | W | Base- ball | Soft- ball | M | W | M | W |
|---|---|---|---|---|---|---|---|---|---|---|---|---|
| Franklin Pierce Ravens | Franklin Pierce University | Rindge | Northeast-10 | Yes | Yes | Yes | Yes | Yes | Yes | Yes (Note: Franklin Pierce and Saint Anselm's women's ice hockey teams compete in Division I as members of the New England Women's Hockey Alliance.) | Yes | Yes |
| Saint Anselm Hawks | Saint Anselm College | Goffstown | Northeast-10 | Yes | Yes | Yes | Yes | Yes | Yes | Yes | Yes | Yes |
| SNHU Penmen | Southern New Hampshire University | Manchester | Northeast-10 | No | Yes | Yes | Yes | Yes | Yes | No | Yes | Yes |

=== Division III ===
Full NCAA Division III member colleges in New Hampshire.
– Football member, – Non-football member

| Team | School | City | Conference | Sport sponsorship | | | | | | | | |
| Team | School | City | Conference | Foot- ball | Basketball | | Base- ball | Soft- ball | Ice hockey | | Soccer | |
| Team | School | City | Conference | Foot- ball | M | W | Base- ball | Soft- ball | M | W | M | W |
|---|---|---|---|---|---|---|---|---|---|---|---|---|
| Colby–Sawyer Chargers | Colby–Sawyer College | New London | Great Northeast | No | Yes | Yes | Yes | No | No | No | Yes | Yes |
| Keene State Owls | Keene State College | Keene | Little East | No | Yes | Yes | Yes | Yes | Yes | Yes | Yes | Yes |
| New England College Pilgrims | New England College | Henniker | Great Northeast | Yes | Yes | Yes | Yes | Yes | Yes (Note: New England College's ice hockey teams compete in the Little East Conference.) | Yes | Yes | Yes |
| Plymouth State Panthers | Plymouth State University | Plymouth | Little East | Yes (Note: Plymouth State's football team competes in the Massachusetts State Collegiate Athletic Conference.) | Yes | Yes | Yes | Yes | Yes | Yes | Yes | Yes |
| Rivier Raiders | Rivier University | Nashua | Great Northeast | No | Yes | Yes | Yes | Yes | Yes (Note: Rivier's ice hockey teams compete in the Massachusetts State Collegiate Athletic Conference.) | Yes | Yes | Yes |

== USCAA ==
| Team | School | City | Conference |
|---|---|---|---|
| NHTI Lynx | NHTI, Concord's Community College | Concord | Yankee Small |

== See also ==
- List of NCAA Division I institutions
- List of NCAA Division II institutions
- List of NCAA Division III institutions
- List of NAIA institutions
- List of USCAA institutions
- List of NCCAA institutions
