= List of college athletic programs in Kentucky =

This is a list of college athletic programs in the U.S. state of Kentucky.

== NCAA ==
=== Division I ===
Full NCAA Division I member colleges in Kentucky.
– FBS Football, – FCS Football, – Non-football, - Sprint football

Team	School	City	Conference	Sport sponsorship						
Team	School	City	Conference	Foot- ball	Basketball		Base- ball	Soft- ball	Soccer	
Team	School	City	Conference	Foot- ball	M	W	Base- ball	Soft- ball	M	W
Bellarmine Knights	Bellarmine University	Louisville	ASUN	(Note: Bellarmine began playing sprint football, a weight-restricted form of football not governed by the NCAA, in 2022 as a charter member of the Midwest Sprint Football League.)	Yes	Yes	Yes	Yes	Yes	Yes
Eastern Kentucky Colonels	Eastern Kentucky University	Richmond	ASUN	FCS (Note: Eastern Kentucky's football program competes in the United Athletic Conference.)	Yes	Yes	Yes	Yes	No	Yes
Kentucky Wildcats	University of Kentucky	Lexington	SEC	FBS	Yes	Yes	Yes	Yes	Yes (Note: Kentucky's men's soccer team competes in the Sun Belt Conference.)	Yes
Louisville Cardinals	University of Louisville	Louisville	ACC	FBS	Yes	Yes	Yes	Yes	Yes	Yes
Morehead State Eagles	Morehead State University	Morehead	OVC	FCS (Note: Morehead State's football program competes in the Pioneer Football League.)	Yes	Yes	Yes	Yes	No	Yes
Murray State Racers	Murray State University	Murray	MVC	FCS (Note: Murray State's football team is a member of the Missouri Valley Football Conference, a separate entity from the MVC.)	Yes	Yes	Yes	Yes	No	Yes
Northern Kentucky Norse	Northern Kentucky University	Highland Heights	Horizon	No	Yes	Yes	Yes	Yes	Yes	Yes
Western Kentucky Hilltoppers and Lady Toppers	Western Kentucky University	Bowling Green	C-USA	FBS	Yes	Yes	Yes	Yes	No	Yes

=== Division II ===
Full NCAA Division II member colleges in Kentucky.

Team	School	City	Conference	Sport sponsorship						
Team	School	City	Conference	Foot- ball	Basketball		Base- ball	Soft- ball	Soccer	
Team	School	City	Conference	Foot- ball	M	W	Base- ball	Soft- ball	M	W
Kentucky State Thorobreds and Thorobrettes	Kentucky State University	Frankfort	SIAC	Yes	Yes	Yes	Yes	Yes	No	No
Kentucky Wesleyan Panthers	Kentucky Wesleyan College	Owensboro	G-MAC	Yes	Yes	Yes	Yes	Yes	Yes	Yes
Thomas More Saints	Thomas More University	Crestview Hills	G-MAC	Yes	Yes	Yes	Yes	Yes	Yes	Yes

=== Division III ===
Full NCAA Division III member colleges in Kentucky.
– Football, – Non-football

Team	School	City	Conference	Sport sponsorship						
Team	School	City	Conference	Foot- ball	Basketball		Base- ball	Soft- ball	Soccer	
Team	School	City	Conference	Foot- ball	M	W	Base- ball	Soft- ball	M	W
Asbury Eagles	Asbury University	Wilmore	CCS	No	Yes	Yes	Yes	Yes	Yes	Yes
Berea Mountaineers	Berea College	Berea	HCAC	No	Yes	Yes	Yes	Yes	Yes	Yes
Centre Colonels	Centre College	Danville	SAA	Yes	Yes	Yes	Yes	Yes	Yes	Yes
Spalding Golden Eagles	Spalding University	Louisville	SLIAC	No	Yes	Yes	Yes	Yes	Yes	Yes
Transylvania Pioneers	Transylvania University	Lexington	HCAC	No	Yes	Yes	Yes	Yes	Yes	Yes

== NAIA ==
Full NAIA member colleges in Kentucky.
– Football, – Non-football, - Sprint football

Team	School	City	Conference	Sport sponsorship						
Team	School	City	Conference	Foot- ball	Basketball		Base- ball	Soft- ball	Soccer	
Team	School	City	Conference	Foot- ball	M	W	Base- ball	Soft- ball	M	W
Alice Lloyd Eagles	Alice Lloyd College	Pippa Passes	Continental	No	Yes	Yes	Yes	Yes	No	No
Brescia Bearcats	Brescia University	Owensboro	River States	No	Yes	Yes	Yes	Yes	Yes	Yes
Campbellsville Tigers	Campbellsville University	Campbellsville	Mid-South	Yes (Note: Campbellsville additionally sponsors flag football as a women's varsity sport.)	Yes	Yes	Yes	Yes	Yes	Yes
Cumberlands Patriots	University of the Cumberlands	Williamsburg	Mid-South	Yes	Yes	Yes	Yes	Yes	Yes	Yes
Georgetown Tigers	Georgetown College	Georgetown	Mid-South	Yes	Yes	Yes	Yes	Yes	Yes	Yes
Kentucky Christian Knights	Kentucky Christian University	Grayson	River States	Yes	Yes	Yes	Yes	Yes (Note: Kentucky Christian's softball team competes in the Mid-South Conference.)	Yes	Yes
Lindsey Wilson Blue Raiders	Lindsey Wilson University	Columbia	Mid-South	Yes	Yes	Yes	Yes	Yes	Yes	Yes
Midway Eagles	Midway University	Midway	River States	(Note: Midway sponsors sprint football, a weight-restricted form of football not governed by the NCAA or NAIA; it is a charter member of the Midwest Sprint Football League. Midway will transition its sprint football team to a full program and join the Mid-States Football Association in 2027–28.)	Yes	Yes	Yes	Yes	Yes	Yes
Pikeville Bears	University of Pikeville	Pikeville	Mid-South	Yes	Yes	Yes	Yes	Yes	Yes	Yes
Union Bulldogs and Lady Bulldogs	Union Commonwealth University	Barbourville	Appalachian	Yes	Yes	Yes	Yes	Yes	Yes	Yes

== NCCAA ==
Team	School	City	Conference
Asbury Eagles	Asbury University	Wilmore	Mid-East
Boyce Bulldogs	Boyce College	Louisville	Mid-East
Campbellsville Pioneers	Campbellsville University	Campbellsville	Mid-East
Simmons College Falcons	Simmons College of Kentucky	Louisville	Mid-East

== See also ==
- List of NCAA Division I institutions
- List of NCAA Division II institutions
- List of NCAA Division III institutions
- List of NAIA institutions
- List of USCAA institutions
- List of NCCAA institutions
