= List of college athletic programs in Hawaii =

This is a list of college athletic programs in the U.S. state of Hawaii.

== NCAA ==
=== Division I ===
Full NCAA Division I member colleges in Hawaii.

Team	School	City	Conference	Sport sponsorship						
Team	School	City	Conference	Football	Basketball		Baseball	Softball	Soccer	
Team	School	City	Conference	Football	M	W	Baseball	Softball	M	W
Hawaii Rainbow Warriors and Rainbow Wahine	University of Hawaii at Manoa	Honolulu	Mountain West	FBS	Yes	Yes	Yes	Yes	No	Yes

=== Division II ===
Full NCAA Division II member colleges in Hawaii.

Team	School	City	Conference	Sport sponsorship					
Team	School	City	Conference	Basketball		Baseball	Softball	Soccer	
Team	School	City	Conference	M	W	Baseball	Softball	M	W
Chaminade Silverswords	Chaminade University of Honolulu	Honolulu	PacWest	Yes	Yes	Yes	Yes	Yes	Yes
Hawaii-Hilo Vulcans	University of Hawaii at Hilo	Hilo	PacWest	Yes	Yes	Yes	Yes	Yes	Yes
Hawaii Pacific Sharks	Hawaii Pacific University	Honolulu	PacWest	Yes	Yes	Yes	Yes	Yes	Yes

== Defunct ==
Team	School	City	Conference	Division	Defunct
BYU-Hawaii Seasiders	Brigham Young University-Hawaii	Laie	PacWest	NCAA Division II	2016-17

== See also ==
- List of NCAA Division I institutions
- List of NCAA Division II institutions
- List of NCAA Division III institutions
- List of NAIA institutions
- List of USCAA institutions
- List of NCCAA institutions
