= Cascade Collegiate Conference =

North American college athletic conference

- Association: NAIA
- Founded: 1993; 33 years ago
- Commissioner: Robert Cashell (since 2012)
- Sports fielded: 15; men's: 7; women's: 8
- No. of teams: 11 (12 in 2027) + 8 associates
- Headquarters: Corvallis, Oregon
- Region: Northwestern United States
- Website: cascadeconference.org

Locations

The Cascade Collegiate Conference (or Cascade Conference) is a college athletic conference affiliated with the National Association of Intercollegiate Athletics (NAIA). Member schools are located in the Northwestern United States. The conference's members compete in 15 sports. The current commissioner of the conference is Robert Cashell.

== History ==
Cascade Collegiate Conference
Location of Cascade members: current, future

=== Timeline ===
- 1993 – The Cascade Collegiate Conference (CCC) was founded. Charter members included Albertson College of Idaho (now the College of Idaho), Concordia College, Portland (later Concordia University-Portland), Eastern Oregon State College (now Eastern Oregon University), George Fox College (George Fox University), Northwest Nazarene College (now Northwest Nazarene University), the Oregon Institute of Technology (Oregon Tech), Southern Oregon State College (now Southern Oregon University), Western Baptist College (now Corban University) and Western Oregon State College (now Western Oregon University), beginning the 1993–94 academic year.
- 1995 – George Fox left the CCC and the NAIA to join the Division III ranks of the National Collegiate Athletic Association (NCAA) and the Northwest Conference (NWC) after the 1994–95 academic year.
- 1997 – Cascade College and Northwest College (now Northwest University) joined the CCC in the 1997–98 academic year.
- 1998 – Western Oregon left the CCC and the NAIA to join the NCAA Division II ranks and the Pacific West Conference (PacWest) after the 1997–98 academic year; while remaining in the conference as an affiliate member for some sports until the end of the 1999–2000 academic year.
- 1999 – The Evergreen State College and Warner Pacific College (now Warner Pacific University) joined the CCC in the 1999–2000 academic year.
- 2007 – Northwest Christian College (now Bushnell University) joined the CCC in the 2007–08 academic year.
- 2008 – The University of British Columbia joined the CCC as an affiliate member for baseball in the 2009 spring season (2008–09 academic year).
- 2009 – Cascade left the CCC as the school ceased operations at the end of the 2008–09 academic year.
- 2010 – Lewis-Clark State College joined the CCC as an affiliate member for baseball in the 2011 spring season (2010–11 academic year).
- 2015 – Multnomah University and Walla Walla University joined the CCC in the 2015-16 academic year.
- 2015 – Four institutions joined the CCC as affiliate members (and/or added other single sports into their affiliate memberships), all effective in the 2015–16 academic year:
  - British Columbia (UBC) for softball
  - Carroll College and the University of Great Falls (now the University of Providence) for men's and women's soccer and softball
  - and Rocky Mountain College for men's and women's soccer
- 2017 – Five institutions joined the CCC as affiliate members (and/or added other single sports into their affiliate memberships), all effective in the 2017–18 academic year:
  - Embry-Riddle Aeronautical University-Prescott, Menlo College, Montana State University-Northern, Providence (MT) and Simpson University for men's wrestling
- 2018 – Two institutions joined the CCC as affiliate members (and/or added other single sports into their affiliate memberships), both effective in the 2018–19 academic year:
  - British Columbia (UBC) for men's and women's golf, and men's and women's outdoor track & field
  - Life Pacific University for men's wrestling
- 2019 – Five institutions joined the CCC as affiliate members (and/or added other single sports into their affiliate memberships), all effective in the 2019–20 academic year:
  - Arizona Christian University and Vanguard University for men's wrestling
  - and Life Pacific, Menlo and Providence (MT) for women's wrestling
- 2020 – Lewis-Clark State upgraded its CCC membership for all sports in the 2020–21 academic year.
- 2021 - Simpson added women's wrestling in its CCC affiliate membership in the 2021–22 academic year.
- 2022 – Life Pacific left the CCC as an affiliate member for men's and women's wrestling as the school dropped both sports at the end of the 2021–22 academic year.
- 2022 – Vanguard added women's wrestling in its CCC affiliate membership in the 2022–23 academic year.
- 2024 – Menlo and Vanguard left the CCC and the NAIA as affiliate members for both men's and women's wrestling to join the NCAA Division II ranks and the Pacific West Conference (PacWest) after the 2023–24 academic year.
- 2024 – Simpson added beach volleyball in its CCC affiliate membership in the 2025 spring season (2024–25 academic year).
- 2025 – Multnomah announced that they would be discontinuing all athletic programs and leaving the CCC at the end of the 2024–25 academic year.
- 2025 – Two institutions joined the CCC as affiliate members (and/or added other single sports into their affiliate memberships), both effective in the 2025–26 academic year:
  - Simpson for softball
  - Trinity Western University for men's and women's cross country and men's and women's track & field
- 2027 – Simpson will upgrade to full CCC membership for all sports, beginning the 2027–28 academic year.

== Member schools ==
=== Current members ===
The CCC currently has 11 full members; all but five are private schools.

Institution	Location	Founded	Affiliation	Enrollment	Nickname	Joined (Note: Represents the calendar year when fall sports competition begins.)
Bushnell University (Note: Formerly known as Northwest Christian University until 2020.)	Eugene, Oregon	1895	Disciples of Christ	758	Beacons	2007
Corban University	Salem, Oregon	1935	Christian	866	Warriors	1993
Eastern Oregon University	La Grande, Oregon	1929	Public	2,798	Mountaineers	1993
The Evergreen State College	Olympia, Washington	1967	Public	2,320	Geoducks	1999
College of Idaho	Caldwell, Idaho	1891	Presbyterian (PCUSA)	1,076	Coyotes	1993
Lewis–Clark State College	Lewiston, Idaho	1893	Public	3,706	Warriors & Lady Warriors	2020
Northwest University	Kirkland, Washington	1934	Assemblies of God	999	Eagles	1997
Oregon Institute of Technology	Klamath Falls, Oregon	1947	Public	5,103	Owls	1993
Southern Oregon University	Ashland, Oregon	1882	Public	5,371	Raiders	1993
Walla Walla University	College Place, Washington	1892	Seventh-day; Adventist	1,397	Wolves	2015 (Note: Walla Walla withdrew from CCC competition during the 2020-21 school year for men's & women's basketball, men's soccer and volleyball as part of its COVID-19 safety plan. All of those mentioned sports returned back to CCC conference play for the 2021-22 school year.)
Warner Pacific University	Portland, Oregon	1937	Church of God	350	Knights	1999

=== Future members ===
The CCC will have one new full member, a private school:

Institution	Location	Founded	Affiliation	Enrollment	Nickname	Joining (Note: Represents the calendar year when fall sports competition begins.)	Current conference
Simpson University	Redding, California	1921	C.M.A.	1,185	Red Hawks	2027	California Pacific (Cal Pac)

=== Affiliate members ===
The CCC currently has nine affiliate members, all but two are private schools:

Institution	Location	Founded	Affiliation	Enrollment	Nickname	Joined (Note: Represents the calendar year when fall sports competition begins.)	CCC sport(s)	Primary conference
Arizona Christian University	Phoenix, Arizona	1960	Nondenominational	1,233	Firestorm	2019	men's wrestling	Great Southwest (GSAC)
University of British Columbia	Vancouver, British Columbia	1908	Public	72,692	Thunderbirds	2008^{bsb.} 2015^{sfb.} 2018^{m.gf.} 2018^{w.gf.} 2018^{m.t.f.} 2018^{w.t.f.}	baseball softball men's golf women's golf men's track & field women's track & field	Canada West (CWUAA) (U Sports)
Carroll College	Helena, Montana	1909	Catholic (Diocese of Helena)	1,103	Fighting Saints	2015^{m.soc.} 2015^{w.soc.} 2015^{sfb.}	men's soccer women's soccer softball	Frontier
Embry-Riddle Aeronautical University-Prescott	Prescott, Arizona	1978	Nonsectarian	3,286	Eagles	2017	men's wrestling	Great Southwest (GSAC)
Montana State University-Northern	Havre, Montana	1929	Public	1,021	Lights	2017	men's wrestling	Frontier
University of Providence (Note: Providence will close at the end of the close following the 2026–27 academic year.)	Great Falls, Montana	1932	Catholic (Ursulines)	677	Argonauts	2015^{m.soc.} 2015^{w.soc.} 2015^{sfb.} 2017^{m.wr.} 2019^{w.wr.}	men's soccer women's soccer softball men's wrestling women's wrestling	Frontier
Rocky Mountain College	Billings, Montana	1878	various (Note: Rocky Mountain has various affiliations: The Mainline Protestant, the United Methodist Church, the Presbyterian Church (USA), and the United Church of Christ.)	1,032	Battlin' Bears	2015^{m.soc.} 2015^{w.soc.}	men's soccer women's soccer	Frontier
Simpson University	Redding, California	1921	Christian & Missionary; Alliance	907	Red Hawks	2017^{m.wr.} 2021^{w.wr.} 2024^{b.vb.} 2025^{sfb.}	men's wrestling women's wrestling beach volleyball softball	California Pacific (CalPac)
Trinity Western University	Langley, British Columbia	1962	Evangelical Christian (E.F.C.C.)	7,475	Spartans	2025^{m.c.c.}; 2025^{w.c.c.}; 2025^{m.t.f.}; 2025^{w.t.f.}	men's cross country; women's cross country; men's track & field; women's track & field	Canada West (CWUAA) (U Sports)

=== Former members ===
The CCC had six former full members, all but one were private schools:

Institution	Location	Founded	Affiliation	Enrollment	Nickname	Joined (Note: Represents the calendar year when fall sports competition begins.)	Left (Note: Represents the calendar year when spring sports competition ends.)	Subsequent conference(s)	Current conference
Cascade College	Portland, Oregon	1956	Churches of Christ	N/A	Thunderbirds	1997	2008	Closed in 2009	
Concordia University-Portland	Portland, Oregon	1905	Lutheran LCMS	N/A	Cavaliers	1993	2015	Great Northwest (GNAC) (Note: Currently an NCAA Division II athletic conference.) (2015-20)	Closed in 2020
George Fox University	Newberg, Oregon	1885	Quakers	4,531	Bruins	1993	1995	Northwest (NWC) (Note: Currently an NCAA Division III athletic conference.) (1995-)	
Multnomah University	Portland, Oregon	1936	Nondenominational	N/A	Lions	2015	2025	Closed in 2025	
Northwest Nazarene University	Nampa, Idaho	1913	Nazarene	1,774	Crusaders (Note: Northwest Nazarene adopted its current nickname of Nighthawks since 2017.)	1993	2000	Pacific West (PacWest) (2000-01)	Great Northwest (GNAC) (2001-)
Western Oregon University (Note: Western Oregon remained in the CCC as an affiliate member for some sports from 1998-99 to 1999-2000.)	Monmouth, Oregon	1856	Public	3,857	Wolves	1993	1998	Pacific West (PacWest) (1998-2001)	Great Northwest (GNAC) (2001-)

=== Former affiliate members ===
The CCC had five former affiliate members, four of them were private schools:

Institution	Location	Founded	Affiliation	Enrollment	Nickname	Joined (Note: Represents the calendar year when fall sports competition begins.)	Left (Note: Represents the calendar year when spring sports competition ends.)	CCC sport(s)	Current conference
Life Pacific University	San Dimas, California	1923	Foursquare Church	504	Warriors	2018^{m.wr.} 2019^{w.wr.}	2022^{m.wr.} 2022^{w.wr.}	men's wrestling women's wrestling	Great Southwest (GSAC)
Menlo College	Atherton, California	1927	Nonsectarian	840	Oaks	2017^{m.wr.} 2019^{w.wr.}	2024^{m.wr.} 2024^{w.wr.}	men's wrestling women's wrestling	Pacific West (PacWest) (Note: Currently an NCAA Division II athletic conference.)
Vanguard University	Costa Mesa, California	1920	Assemblies of God	2,219	Lions	2019^{m.wr.} 2022^{w.wr.}	2024^{m.wr.} 2024^{w.wr.}	men's wrestling women's wrestling	Pacific West (PacWest)
Western Oregon University (Note: Western Oregon was a full member of the CCC from 1993–94 to 1997–98.)	Monmouth, Oregon	1856	Public	3,857	Wolves	1998^{w.soc.} 1998^{m.t.f.} 1998^{w.t.f.}	2000^{w.soc.} 2000^{m.t.f.} 2000^{w.t.f.}	women's soccer men's track & field women's track & field	Great Northwest (GNAC)
Westminster College	Salt Lake City, Utah	1875	Nonsectarian	1,214	Griffins	1994	1995	women's soccer	Rocky Mountain (RMAC)

=== Membership timeline ===
Full member (non-football) Associate member (sport)

== Fielded sports ==
=== Fall ===
- Men's cross country: ten schools participate
- Women's cross country: ten schools participate
- Men's soccer: fourteen schools participate
- Women's soccer: Thirteen schools participate
- Women's Volleyball: all full member schools participate

=== Winter ===
- Men's basketball: all full member schools participate
- Women's basketball: all full member schools participate
- Wrestling: Added in 2017, 12 men's teams and seven women's teams participate

=== Spring ===
- Baseball: seven schools participate
- Golf (men's & women's): eight men's and seven women's teams participate
- Softball: eleven schools participate
- Men's track and field: ten schools participate
- Women's track and field: ten schools participate

=== Sports not sponsored ===
- College of Idaho participates in men's and women's skiing as a member of the Northwest Conference of the United States Collegiate Ski and Snowboard Association, men's and women's swimming, and women's tennis, and football in the Frontier Conference.
- Eastern Oregon participates in football as a member of the Frontier Conference.
- Southern Oregon participates in football as a member of the Frontier Conference.

== Commissioners ==
- Howard Morris (1994–2003)
- Phil Pifer (2003–2006)
- Bart Valentine (2007)
- Dave Haglund (2007–2012)
- Robert Cashell (2012–present)

== Champions ==
=== Conference titles by school ===
School	Titles
British Columbia	17
Bushnell	2
Carroll	3
Concordia–Portland	75
Corban	26
Eastern Oregon	48
Embry Riddle	1
George Fox	6
College of Idaho	66
Lewis-Clark State	6
Menlo	7
Multnomah	1
Northwest	7
Northwest Christian	6
Northwest Nazarene	7
Oregon Tech	32
Rocky Mountain	3
Southern Oregon	61
Warner Pacific	7
Western Oregon	21

=== Cross country ===
Men

Year	Team
1994	Eastern Oregon
1995	Eastern Oregon
1996	Eastern Oregon
1997	Eastern Oregon
1998	Eastern Oregon
1999	Eastern Oregon
2000	Eastern Oregon
2001	Eastern Oregon
2002	Eastern Oregon
2003	Eastern Oregon
2004	Southern Oregon
2005	Southern Oregon
2006	Concordia–Portland
2007	Eastern Oregon
2008	Southern Oregon
2009	Southern Oregon
2010	Southern Oregon
2011	Southern Oregon
2012	Southern Oregon
2013	Southern Oregon
2014	Southern Oregon
2015	Southern Oregon
2016	Southern Oregon
2017	Southern Oregon
2018	College of Idaho
2019	College of Idaho
2020	Lewis-Clark State
2021	College of Idaho
2022	Southern Oregon
2023	Eastern Oregon
2024	College of Idaho
2025	Eastern Oregon

Women

Year	Team
1994	George Fox
1995	Eastern Oregon
1996	Eastern Oregon
1997	Eastern Oregon
1998	Eastern Oregon
1999	Eastern Oregon
2000	Northwest
2001	Northwest
2002	Northwest
2003	Northwest
2004	Northwest
2005	Eastern Oregon
2006	Corban
2007	Eastern Oregon
2008	College of Idaho
2009	College of Idaho
2010	Concordia–Portland
2011	College of Idaho
2012	College of Idaho
2013	College of Idaho
2014	Northwest Christian
2015	Northwest Christian
2016	Northwest Christian
2017	Oregon Tech
2018	Oregon Tech
2019	College of Idaho
2020	College of Idaho
2021	College of Idaho
2022	College of Idaho
2023	College of Idaho
2024	College of Idaho
2025	College of Idaho

=== Soccer ===
Men

Year	Team	Record	Tournament
1994	George Fox	5–0–0	
1995	Corban	5–1–0	
1996	Corban	5–0–1	
1997	Corban	8–1–1	Corban
1998	Concordia–Portland; Corban	7–3–0	Concordia–Portland
1999	Concordia–Portland	9–1–0	Concordia–Portland
2000	Concordia–Portland	10–2–0	
2001	College of Idaho	10–2–0	
2002	Concordia–Portland	10–2–0	Concordia–Portland
2003	Concordia–Portland	10–2–0	College of Idaho
2004	Concordia–Portland	9–2–1	
2005	Concordia–Portland	11–1–0	
2006	Concordia–Portland; College of Idaho	9–3–0	
2007	Concordia–Portland	13–1–0	
2008	College of Idaho †	12–0–0	Concordia–Portland
2009	Warner Pacific	11–2–1	Warner Pacific
2010	Concordia–Portland	12–1–1	Concordia–Portland
2011	Concordia–Portland	11–1–1	Concordia–Portland
2012	Concordia–Portland	12–1–1	Concordia–Portland
2013	Corban	11–1–2	Corban
2014	Concordia–Portland	12–2–0	Corban
2015	Rocky Mountain	11–1–1	Rocky Mountain
2016	Corban; Rocky Mountain	11–2; 10–1–2	Corban
2017	Southern Oregon; Rocky Mountain	11–1–1	Southern Oregion
2018	Southern Oregon	11–0–2	Rocky Mountain
2019	Corban	12–0–1	Corban
2020	Rocky Mountain	8–0–0	
2021	Warner Pacific; Oregon Tech	11–1–1	Oregon Tech
2022	Warner Pacific	11–0–2	Warner Pacific
2023	Southern Oregon	12–1–0	College of Idaho
2024	Carroll	11–1–1	Eastern Oregon
2025	Eastern Oregon	10–0–2	Warner Pacific
† Overall Champion

Women

Year	Team	Record	Tournament
1996	Corban	4–2–0	
1997	Concordia–Portland	8–1–1	
1998	Concordia–Portland	9–0–1	
1999	Corban	8–1–1	
2000	Concordia–Portland	10–0–0	Concordia–Portland
2001	Concordia–Portland	13–1–0	Concordia–Portland
2002	Concordia–Portland	16–0–0	Concordia–Portland
2003	Concordia–Portland †	10–0–1	
2004	Concordia–Portland †	10–0–1	
2005	Concordia–Portland †	10–1–0	Concordia–Portland
2006	Concordia–Portland	9–0–0	Concordia–Portland
2007	Concordia–Portland	10–0–0	Concordia–Portland
2008	Concordia–Portland	10–0–0	
2009	Concordia–Portland; College of Idaho	8–1–0	
2010	Concordia–Portland	8–0–1	
2011	Concordia–Portland	8–1–0	
2012	Northwest	7–1–1	Concordia–Portland
2013	Concordia–Portland	9–0–0	Concordia–Portland
2014	Northwest	8–0–1	Concordia–Portland
2015	Carroll	9–1–1	Carroll
2016	Southern Oregon; Carroll	9–2; 8–0–3	
2017	Eastern Oregon	9–1–1	Eastern Oregon
2018	Eastern Oregon; Carroll	9–1–2	Northwest
2019	Oregon Tech	10–0–2	Eastern Oregon
2020	Oregon Tech	9–1–0	
2021	Oregon Tech	11–1–0	Oregon Tech
2022	Northwest	10–1–1	Northwest
2023	College of Idaho	12–0–0	College of Idaho
2024	College of Idaho	12–0–0	College of Idaho
2025	College of Idaho	11–1–0	College of Idaho
† Overall Champion

=== Volleyball ===
Year	Team	Record	Tournament
1988	Western Oregon	8–0	Western Oregon
1989	Western Oregon	8–0	Western Oregon
1990	Western Oregon; Southern Oregon	6–2	Western Oregon
1991	Southern Oregon	8–0	Southern Oregon
1992	Western Oregon	7–0	Western Oregon
1993	Western Oregon	6–0	Western Oregon
1994	Northwest Nazarene	7–0	Northwest Nazarene
1995	Western Oregon; Northwest Nazarene	11–1	Western Oregon
1996	Western Oregon	11–1	Northwest Nazarene
1997	Western Oregon	14–2	Corban
1998	Northwest Nazarene	15–1	Northwest Nazarene
1999	Concordia–Portland	14–2	Concordia–Portland
2000	Concordia–Portland	16–0	Concordia–Portland
2001	Concordia–Portland	16–0	Concordia–Portland
2002	Concordia–Portland	18–0	Concordia–Portland
2003	Southern Oregon	15–3	Southern Oregon
2004	Southern Oregon; Northwest	15–3	Southern Oregon
2005	Southern Oregon	17–1	Southern Oregon
2006	College of Idaho	18–0	College of Idaho
2007	Southern Oregon; College of Idaho	19–1	Southern Oregon

Year	Team	Record	Tournament
2008	College of Idaho	18–2	College of Idaho
2009	College of Idaho	17–1	Western Oregon
2010	Southern Oregon	17–1	Southern Oregon
2011	College of Idaho	17–1	College of Idaho
2012	College of Idaho	16–2	College of Idaho
2013	College of Idaho	16–2	College of Idaho
2014	Eastern Oregon	16–2	College of Idaho
2015	Eastern Oregon	18–2	College of Idaho
2016	Eastern Oregon	19–1	Eastern Oregon
2017	Eastern Oregon	19–1	Eastern Oregon
2018	Southern Oregon; Eastern Oregon	17–3	Southern Oregon
2019	Southern Oregon; Eastern Oregon	18–2	Southern Oregon
2020	Eastern Oregon	14–0	Corban
2021	Corban	20–2	Corban
2022	Eastern Oregon	21–1	Eastern Oregon
2023	Eastern Oregon	21–1	Eastern Oregon
2024	Eastern Oregon; Southern Oregon; Corban	19–3	Southern Oregon
2025	Eastern Oregon	18–2	Southern Oregon

=== Beach Volleyball ===
Year	Team	Record	Tournament
2024	Corban	11–1	Corban
2025	Corban	15–0	Corban

=== Basketball ===
Men

Year	Team	Record	Tournament
1992–93	College of Idaho	14–2	College of Idaho
1993–94	Northwest Nazarene	14–2	Northwest Nazarene
1994–95	Northwest Nazarene	13–3	Northwest Nazarene
1995–96	College of Idaho	13–1	College of Idaho
1996–97	Oregon Tech	12–2	Corban
1997–98	Corban; Northwest Nazarene	14–4	Corban
1998–99	Southern Oregon	14–2	Southern Oregon
1999–00	Concordia–Portland	13–3	Oregon Tech
2000–01	Oregon Tech	16–2	College of Idaho
2001–02	Evergreen	17–1	Corban
2002–03	Cascade; Concordia–Portland; Oregon Tech	13–5	College of Idaho
2003–04	College of Idaho	16–2	College of Idaho
2004–05	Oregon Tech; Southern Oregon	14–4	Southern Oregon
2005–06	Warner Pacific	13–5	Oregon Tech
2006–07	Oregon Tech; Warner Pacific	15–3	Warner Pacific
2007–08	Eastern Oregon	17–3	Warner Pacific
2008–09	Oregon Tech; Eastern Oregon	15–3	Oregon Tech
2009–10	Oregon Tech	15–3	Oregon Tech
2010–11	Oregon Tech	16–2	Oregon Tech
2011–12	Oregon Tech; Northwest	15–3	Oregon Tech
2012–13	Eastern Oregon; Warner Pacific	15–3	Warner Pacific
2013–14	College of Idaho	16–2	College of Idaho
2014–15	College of Idaho; Concordia–Portland	14–4	College of Idaho
2015–16	Northwest Christian	17–3	Northwest Christian
2016–17	Northwest Christian	17–3	Idaho
2017–18	College of Idaho	18–2	College of Idaho
2018–19	Oregon Tech	18–2	College of Idaho
2019–20	College of Idaho	20–0	College of Idaho
2020–21	Lewis-Clark State	2–0	Lewis-Clark State
2021 Spring	Corban	10–2	No spring tourney held
2021–22	College of Idaho	20–2	College of Idaho
2022–23	College of Idaho	22–0	College of Idaho
2023–24	College of Idaho	22–0	Oregon Tech
2024–25	College of Idaho	21–1	College of Idaho

Women

Year	Team	Record	Tournament
1991–92	Western Oregon	10–2	
1992–93	Southern Oregon	8–2	Not Played
1993–94	Western Oregon	11–1	Western Oregon
1994–95	Western Oregon	10–2	Western Oregon
1995–96	Western Oregon	11–1	Western Oregon
1996–97	Northwest Nazarene	10–2	Northwest Nazarene
1997–98	Western Oregon	13–1	Southern Oregon
1998–99	Southern Oregon	10–2	Southern Oregon
1999–00	Northwest Nazarene	14–1	Northwest Nazarene
2000–01	College of Idaho	14–2	Corban
2001–02	Eastern Oregon	13–3	Southern Oregon
2002–03	Southern Oregon	16–2	Southern Oregon
2003–04	Eastern Oregon	17–1	Eastern Oregon
2004–05	Oregon Tech; Eastern Oregon	16–2	Corban
2005–06	Warner Pacific	16–2	Eastern Oregon
2006–07	Eastern Oregon; Corban	15–3	Corban
2007–08	Southern Oregon; Eastern Oregon	17–3	Southern Oregon
2008–09	Concordia–Portland; College of Idaho	18–2	Concordia–Portland
2009–10	College of Idaho	14–4	College of Idaho
2010–11	Concordia–Portland; Corban	13–5	Concordia–Portland
2011–12	Corban	15–3	College of Idaho
2012–13	Eastern Oregon	18–0	Eastern Oregon
2013–14	Eastern Oregon	14–4	Oregon Tech
2014–15	Eastern Oregon	16–2	Oregon Tech
2015–16	Southern Oregon	19–1	Southern Oregon
2016–17	Southern Oregon	18–2	Southern Oregon
2017–18	Eastern Oregon	20–0	Eastern Oregon
2018–19	Eastern Oregon	19–1	Eastern Oregon
2019–20	Northwest Christian	17–3	Northwest Christian
2020–21	Lewis-Clark State	2–0	Lewis-Clark State
2021 Spring	Bushnell	9–1	No spring tourney held
2021–22	Lewis-Clark State	19–3	Southern Oregon
2022–23	Eastern Oregon; Lewis-Clark State	21–1	Eastern Oregon
2023–24	Southern Oregon	20–2	Southern Oregon
2024–25	Southern Oregon	22–0	Southern Oregon

=== Baseball ===
Year	Team	Record	Tournament
1993	George Fox	14–3–0	
1994	George Fox	16–2–0	
1995	Western Oregon	18–2–0	
1996	College of Idaho	14–0–1	
1997	College of Idaho	14–1–0	
1998	College of Idaho	29–1–0	
1999	College or Idaho	25–4–0	
2000	College of Idaho	25–5–0	
2001	Western Oregon	25–7–0	
2002	College of Idaho	18–6–0	
2003	Concordia–Portland	11–9–0	
2004	Concordia–Portland	22–8–0	
2005	College of Idaho; Oregon Tech	17–13–0	
2006	College of Idaho	20–10–0	
2007	College of Idaho	15–3–0	
2008	College of Idaho	14–4–0	
2009	British Columbia	27–6–0	
2010	British Columbia	27–5–0	
2011	Lewis–Clark State	23–8–0	
2012	Lewis–Clark State	25–6–0	
2013	Lewis–Clark State	22–6–0	
2014	Lewis–Clark State	24–4–0	
2015	Lewis-Clark State	24–4–0	
2016	Lewis–Clark State	30–5	
2017	Lewis–Clark State	22–8	
2018	Lewis–Clark State	26–6	
2019	Lewis–Clark State	24–8	
2021	Lewis–Clark State	30–2	Lewis–Clark State
2022	Lewis–Clark State	19–3	Lewis–Clark State
2023	Oregon Tech; British Columbia	16–8	British Columbia
2024	Lewis-Clark State	21–3	Bushnell
2025	British Columbia	29–8	Lewis-Clark State

=== Golf ===
Men

Year	Team
2008	Concordia–Portland
2009	Concordia–Portland
2010	Concordia–Portland
2011	Concordia–Portland
2012	Concordia–Portland
2013	Warner Pacific College
2014	Concordia–Portland
2015	Concordia–Portland
2016	Oregon Tech
2017	Northwest Christian
2018	Oregon Tech
2019	British Columbia
2021	Multnomah
2022	British Columbia
2023	British Columbia
2024	British Columbia
2025	British Columbia

Women

Year	Team
2008	Concordia–Portland
2009	Concordia–Portland
2010	Concordia–Portland
2011	Concordia–Portland
2012	Concordia–Portland
2013	Concordia–Portland
2014	Concordia–Portland
2015	Concordia–Portland
2016	Corban
2017	Oregon Tech
2018	Oregon Tech
2019	British Columbia
2021	Oregon Tech
2022	British Columbia
2023	British Columbia
2024	British Columbia
2025	British Columbia

=== Softball ===
Year	Team	Record	Tournament
1999	Eastern Oregon	14–4	
2000	No Cascade schedule		
2001	Oregon Tech	14–4	
2002	Oregon Tech	16–4	
2003	Southern Oregon	11–4	
2004	Southern Oregon	20–5	
2005	Southern Oregon	19–6	
2006	Oregon Tech	17–2	
2007	College of Idaho	16–4	
2008	Oregon Tech	20–4	
2009	College of Idaho	20–4	
2010	Concordia–Portland	21–3	Concordia–Portland
2011	Oregon Tech	19–5	Oregon Tech
2012	Oregon Tech	20–4	Oregon Tech
2013	Corban	24–4	College of Idaho
2014	Oregon Tech	23–5	Concordia–Portland
2015	Oregon Tech	22–6	Corban
2016	E: Carroll; W: Southern Oregon	7–5; 15–5	Eastern Oregon
2017	Corban	22–5	Southern Oregon
2018	Southern Oregon	22–5	Southern Oregon
2019	Southern Oregon	24–3	Southern Oregon
2021	Southern Oregon	26–1	Oregon Tech
2022	Oregon Tech	25–5	Oregon Tech
2023	Oregon Tech	29–1	Oregon Tech
2024	Oregon Tech	24–3	Eastern Oregon
2025	Oregon Tech; Southern Oregon	23–4	Eastern Oregon

=== Track and field ===
Men

Year	Team
1995	George Fox
1996	Western Oregon
1997	Western Oregon
1998	Western Oregon
1999	Western Oregon
2000	Southern Oregon
2001	Southern Oregon
2002	Southern Oregon
2003	Eastern Oregon
2004	Southern Oregon
2005	Southern Oregon
2006	Concordia–Portland
2007	Concordia–Portland; Eastern Oregon
2008	Concordia–Portland
2009	Concordia–Portland
2010	Concordia–Portland
2011	Concordia–Portland
2012	Concordia–Portland
2013	Southern Oregon
2014	Southern Oregon
2015	Eastern Oregon
2016	Southern Oregon
2017	Southern Oregon
2018	Eastern Oregon
2019	Southern Oregon
2021	College of Idaho; Eastern Oregon
2022	Eastern Oregon
2023	Eastern Oregon
2024	Eastern Oregon
2025	Eastern Oregon

Women

Year	Team
1995	George Fox
1996	Western Oregon
1997	Western Oregon
1998	Western Oregon
1999	Western Oregon
2000	Southern Oregon
2001	Southern Oregon
2002	Southern Oregon
2003	Oregon Tech
2004	Oregon Tech
2005	Oregon Tech
2006	Oregon Tech
2007	Concordia–Portland
2008	Concordia–Portland
2009	Concordia–Portland
2010	Concordia–Portland
2011	Concordia–Portland
2012	Concordia–Portland
2013	College of Idaho
2014	College of Idaho
2015	College of Idaho
2016	College of Idaho
2017	College of Idaho
2018	College of Idaho
2019	British Columbia
2021	College of Idaho
2022	British Columbia
2023	British Columbia
2024	Eastern Oregon
2025	British Columbia

=== Wrestling ===
Men

Year	Team
2018	Menlo; Southern Oregon
2019	Embry Riddle
2020	Menlo
2022	Eastern Oregon
2023	Menlo
2024	Menlo
2025	Southern Oregon
2026	Southern Oregon

Women

Year	Team
2020	Menlo
2022	Menlo
2023	Southern Oregon
2024	Menlo
2025	Southern Oregon
