= List of NJCAA Division III schools =

There are 105 Division III teams in the National Junior College Athletic Association (NJCAA) that play in 24 different regions, making it the smallest division in the NJCAA by school count.

These schools do not provide athletically related financial assistance.

== Members ==
=== Connecticut ===
- Gateway Community College Lions in New Haven
- University of Connecticut at Avery Point Pointers in Groton

=== Georgia ===
- Oxford College of Emory University Eagles in Oxford

=== Illinois ===
- College of DuPage Chaparrals in Glen Ellyn
- Harper College Hawks in Palatine
- Joliet Junior College Wolves in Joliet
- Rock Valley College Golden Eagles in Rockford

=== Kentucky ===
- Elizabethtown Community and Technical College Barons in Elizabethtown

=== Maryland ===
- Anne Arundel Community College Riverhawks in Arnold
- Prince George's Community College Owls in Largo

=== Massachusetts ===
- Benjamin Franklin Institute of Technology Shockers in Boston
- Berkshire Community College Falcons in Pittsfield
- Bristol Community College Bayhawks in Fall River
- Bunker Hill Community College Bulldogs in Charlestown
- Holyoke Community College Cougars in Holyoke
- Mass Bay Community College Buccaneers in Wellesley
- Northern Essex Community College Knights in Haverhill
- Quincy College Granite in Quincy
- Quinsigamond Community College Wyverns in Worcester
- Roxbury Community College Tigers in Boston
- Springfield Technical Community College Rams in Springfield

=== Minnesota ===
- Anoka-Ramsey Community College Golden Rams in Coon Rapids
- Central Lakes College Raiders in Brainerd
- Hibbing Community College Cardinals in Hibbing
- Itasca Community College Vikings in Grand Rapids
- Mesabi Range College Norse in Virginia
- Minneapolis Community & Technical College Mavericks in Minneapolis
- Minnesota State Community & Technical College Spartans in Fergus Falls
- Minnesota West Community & Technical College Bluejays in Worthington
- Northland Community & Technical College Pioneers in Thief River Falls
- Rainy River Community College Voyageurs in International Falls
- Ridgewater College Warriors in Wilmar
- Riverland Community College Blue Devils in Austin
- Rochester Community & Technical College Yellowjackets in Rochester
- Vermilion Community College Ironmen/Ironwomen in Ely

=== New Jersey ===
- Atlantic Cape Community College Buccaneers in Mays Landing
- Bergen Community College Bulldogs in Paramus
- Brookdale Community College Jersey Blues in Lincroft
- Camden County College Cougars in Blackwood
- Gloucester County College Roadrunners in Sewell
- Middlesex County College Colts in Edison
- Ocean County College Vikings in Toms River
- Passaic County Community College Panthers in Paterson
- Raritan Valley Community College Lions in North Branch
- Sussex County Community College Skylanders in Newton
- Union College Owls in Cranford

=== New York ===
- Adirondack Community College Wolves in Queensbury
- Borough of Manhattan Community College Panthers in New York City
- Bronx Community College Broncos in University Heights
- Broome Community College Hornets in Binghamton
- Cayuga Community College Spartans in Auburn
- Clinton Community College, New York Cougars in Plattsburgh
- Columbia-Greene Community College Twins in Hudson
- Corning Community College Red Barons in Corning
- Dutchess Community College Falcons in Poughkeepsie
- Fashion Institute of Technology Tigers in New York City
- Finger Lakes Community College Lakers in Canandaigua
- Fulton-Montgomery Community College Raiders in Johnstown
- Genesee Community College Cougars in Batavia
- Herkimer County Community College Generals in Herkimer
- Hostos Community College Caimans in Bronx
- Jefferson Community College Cannoneers in Watertown
- Kingsborough Community College Wave in Brooklyn
- LaGuardia Community College Red Hawks in Queens
- Mohawk Valley Community College Hawks in Utica
- Monroe University Express in Bronx
- Nassau Community College Lions in Garden City
- North Country Community College Saints in Saranac
- Onondaga Community College Lazers in Syracuse
- Queensborough Community College Tigers in Queens
- Rockland Community College Fighting Hawks in Viola
- Schenectady County Community College Royals in Schenectady
- Suffolk County Community College Sharks in Selden
- Sullivan County Community College Generals in Loch Sheldrake
- Tompkins Cortland Community College Panthers in Dryden
- Ulster County Community College Senators in Stone Ridge

=== North Carolina ===
- Caldwell Community College & Technical Institute Cobras in Caldwell
- Catawba Valley Community College Buccaneers in Hickory
- Central Carolina Community College Cougars in Sanford
- Davidson County Community College Storm in Lexington
- Rockingham Community College Eagles in Wentworth
- Sandhills Community College Flyers in Pinehurst
- Vance–Granville Community College Vanguards in Henderson

=== Ohio ===
- Lorain County Community College Commodores in Elyria
- Owens Community College Express in Perrysburg
- Terra State Community College Titans in Fremont

=== Pennsylvania ===
- Butler County Community College (Pennsylvania) Pioneers in Butler
- Community College of Allegheny County Wildcats Pittsburgh
- Northampton Community College Spartans in Bethlehem
- Thaddeus Stevens College of Technology Bulldogs in Lancaster
- Westmoreland County Community College Wolfpack in Youngwood

=== Texas ===
- Brookhaven College Bears in Farmers Branch
- Cedar Valley College Suns in Lancaster
- Eastfield College Harvesters in Mesquite
- Mountain View College (Texas) Lions in Dallas
- North Lake College Blazers in Irving
- Richland College Thunderduck in Dallas

=== Virginia ===
- Southside Virginia Community College Panthers in Alberta
- Thomas Nelson Community College Gators in Hampton
- Tidewater Community College Storm in Norfolk

=== Wisconsin ===
- Madison Area Technical College WolfPack in Madison
- Mid-State Technical College Cougars in Marshfield
- Milwaukee Area Technical College Stormers in Milwaukee
- Western Technical College Cavaliers in LaCrosse
- University of Wisconsin–Whitewater at Rock County Warhawks in Jonesville

== See also ==
- List of NJCAA Division I schools
- List of NJCAA Division II schools
- List of junior college football programs in the United States
- List of USCAA institutions
- List of NCCAA institutions
- List of NAIA institutions
- List of NCAA Division I institutions
- List of NCAA Division II institutions
- List of NCAA Division III institutions
