= Sharon Barker =

Canadian-American women's rights activist

Sharon E. Barker
- Born: July 29, 1949; New Brunswick, Canada
- Died: November 18, 2023 (aged 74); Bangor, Maine
- Education: B.S. psychology, University of Maine; M.S. public administration, University of Maine
- Occupations: Director, Women's Resource Center at the University of Maine
- Years active: 1991–2014
- Employer: University of Maine
- Partner: John Hoyt
- Children: 2
- Awards: Maine Women's Hall of Fame, 2009

Sharon E. Barker (July 29, 1949 – November 18, 2023) was a Canadian-American women's rights activist, women's health advocate, and feminist. She was the founding director of the Women's Resource Center at the University of Maine and one of the founders and first president of the Mabel Sine Wadsworth Women's Health Center in Bangor. For over 30 years she advocated for women and girls in the areas of health care, gender equality, sexual assault, and reproductive rights. She was inducted into the Maine Women's Hall of Fame in 2009.

== Early life and education ==
Sharon Barker was born in New Brunswick, Canada. She had two sisters. At the age of 8 she moved with her family to Fort Fairfield, Maine. In the third grade she befriended Ruth Lockhart, with whom she would co-found the Mabel Sine Wadsworth Women's Health Center. She earned her bachelor's degree in psychology and master's degree in public administration at the University of Maine.

== Career ==
Why is it only exceptional women that can succeed? Why is it only women who are willing to sacrifice their lives that are capable of working in some of these fields? ... I say we will succeed not when all exceptional women are let into these fields, but when mediocre women are let in at the same rate as mediocre men.

— Sharon Barker, 2009

After graduation, Barker helped manage the Community House, an adult-education program in Fort Fairfield, and worked briefly as a taxi driver. She then worked for ten years as a family planning counselor and coordinator for Penquis CAP in Bangor. In 1984 she, Lockhart, and three other activists founded the Mabel Sine Wadsworth Women's Health Center as a private, non-profit center that would provide abortion services and lesbian health care. Barker was the center's first president.

In 1991 Barker was named director of the new Women's Resource Center at the University of Maine, which provides information and advocacy for students. She filled the position on a part-time basis until 1999, when her salary was ensured by a grant. Among the initiatives she oversaw were the Safe Campus project against sexual assault, the United Sisters mentoring program pairing college women with high-school girls, the Girls' Collaborative Project, $tart $mart salary negotiation workshops, and the annual "Expanding Your Horizons" conference that brings 500 middle school girls to campus to explore career opportunities in the STEM fields. Barker was also a frequent speaker and workshop presenter on health care, gender equality, and women's rights.

== Memberships ==
Barker was a member of numerous state nonprofit boards and committees, including the Penobscot Valley American Association of University Women, Maine Women's Fund, Eastern Regional Commission for Women, Good Samaritan Agency, Bangor CUReS Project, Bangor Rape Crisis Center, Women's Business Development Corporation, the Komen Foundation, and the Maine Jobs Council. She was appointed to Rep. John Baldacci's Advisory Committee on Juvenile Crime, Domestic Violence, Drug Abuse and Hate Crimes. In 1995 she was named to a panel that developed ideas to reduce the threat of violence at state abortion clinics. She established the Maine chapter of the National Abortion Rights Action League.

== Awards and honors ==
Barker received the Mary Hatwood Futrell Award from the National Education Association in 1997. She was also the recipient of the Mabel Sine Wadsworth Women's Health Achievement Award (1997), the Woman of the Year citation from the Bangor and Maine Federation of Business and Professional Women (1999), and the Sarah Orne Jewett Award of the Maine Women’s Fund (2004), recognizing lifetime achievement in advocating for women and girls in the areas of "health care, poverty, sexual assault, juvenile justice, gender equity, education and peace", from the Maine Women's Fund. She was inducted into the Maine Women's Hall of Fame in 2009.

== Personal life ==
Barker and her life partner, John S. Hoyt, had two sons.

Barker died on November 18, 2023.
