= Linda Smith Dyer =

American activist

- Dyer in 1998
- Born: Linda Smith; August 6, 1948; Lewiston, Maine
- Died: September 27, 2001 (aged 53)
- Education: B.S. mathematics, University of Maine; M.S. mathematics, University of Maine; J.D., University of Maine (1980)
- Occupations: Lawyer, lobbyist, women's rights activist
- Years active: 1977–2001
- Spouses: Isaac W. Dyer; Charles Jacobs
- Children: 3
- Awards: Maine Women's Hall of Fame (2001)

Linda Smith Dyer (August 6, 1948 – September 27, 2001) was an American lawyer, lobbyist, and women's rights activist. After a two-decade legal career, she entered public service as deputy commissioner of the Maine Department of Agriculture. She co-founded the Maine Women's Lobby and was active in the effort to ratify the Equal Rights Amendment in Maine. A member on numerous boards and committees, she was a past president of the Maine State Bar Association and the Family Planning Association of Maine. She was inducted into the Maine Women's Hall of Fame in 2001, a few months before her death.

== Early life and education ==
Linda Smith was born in Lewiston, Maine to Clement and Mary Ellen Smith. She had two brothers and two sisters. She grew up on her family's dairy farm in Monmouth. After her mother's death in 1961, her father remarried.

She earned her bachelor's and master's degrees in mathematics from the University of Maine at Orono. In 1980 she earned her Juris Doctor degree.

== Attorney and lobbyist ==
In 1979 she joined the law firm of Doyle and Nelson in Augusta. In 1981 she opened her own law practice in Augusta, which eventually became known as Dyer and Goodall. In the 1980s and 1990s she specialized in legislative advocacy, representing numerous groups including Tetra Pak Inc., a manufacturer of juice boxes, ITW Hi-Cone, and dairy and milk companies.

In 1999 Dyer was named deputy commissioner of the Maine Department of Agriculture. During her tenure, she chaired the Northeast Dairy Compact.

== Women's rights activist ==
In 1977 she was named presiding officer of the Maine State Meeting for Women, which elected 19 delegates, Dyer among them, to represent the state at the 1977 National Women's Conference. In 1978 Dyer co-founded the Maine Women's Lobby with Janet T. Mills and Lois Galgay Reckitt.

Dyer was active in the effort to ratify the Equal Rights Amendment in Maine, serving on the ERA for Maine steering committee and appearing on a debate-style program on WVII-TV in 1984 as a proponent of the measure. She rebutted claims by opponents that the amendment would yield taxpayer-funded abortions for low-income women and legalize same-sex marriage in the state.

== Other activities ==
Dyer was a member of the first town council in Winthrop in the 1970s, and was re-elected in 1998. She founded and served as president of the Winthrop Educational Corporation, which raises funds to benefit local schools. She served as chair and trustee of the Cobbossee Watershed District, was a labor consultant for the Maine State Employees Association and sat on the board of directors of Cushnoc Bank and Trust Company. She carried out independent research surveying equal employment opportunity practices in the state government for the Maine Human Rights Commission.

== Memberships ==
A member of the Maine State Bar Association, she served as its president in 1998. She was a board member of the Family Planning Association of Maine, serving as president in 1990. She was a member of the Maine Advisory Committee to the United States Commission on Civil Rights. She was a board member of the University of Maine Foundation.

== Awards and honors ==
In 2001 Dyer was inducted into the Maine Women's Hall of Fame. That same year, she received the Sarah Orne Jewett Award from the Maine Women's Fund for her efforts on behalf of women and girls. The Maine Women's Policy Center established the Linda Smith Dyer Fellowship for qualifying law students in her memory.

== Personal life ==
Dyer married twice. With her first husband, Isaac W. Dyer, she had twin sons. Her second husband is Charles Jacobs, a deputy commissioner for the Maine Department of Administrative and Financial Services, with whom she had one daughter. They were residents of Winthrop. Dyer died of cancer on September 27, 2001, age 53.
