= Maine Women's Hall of Fame =

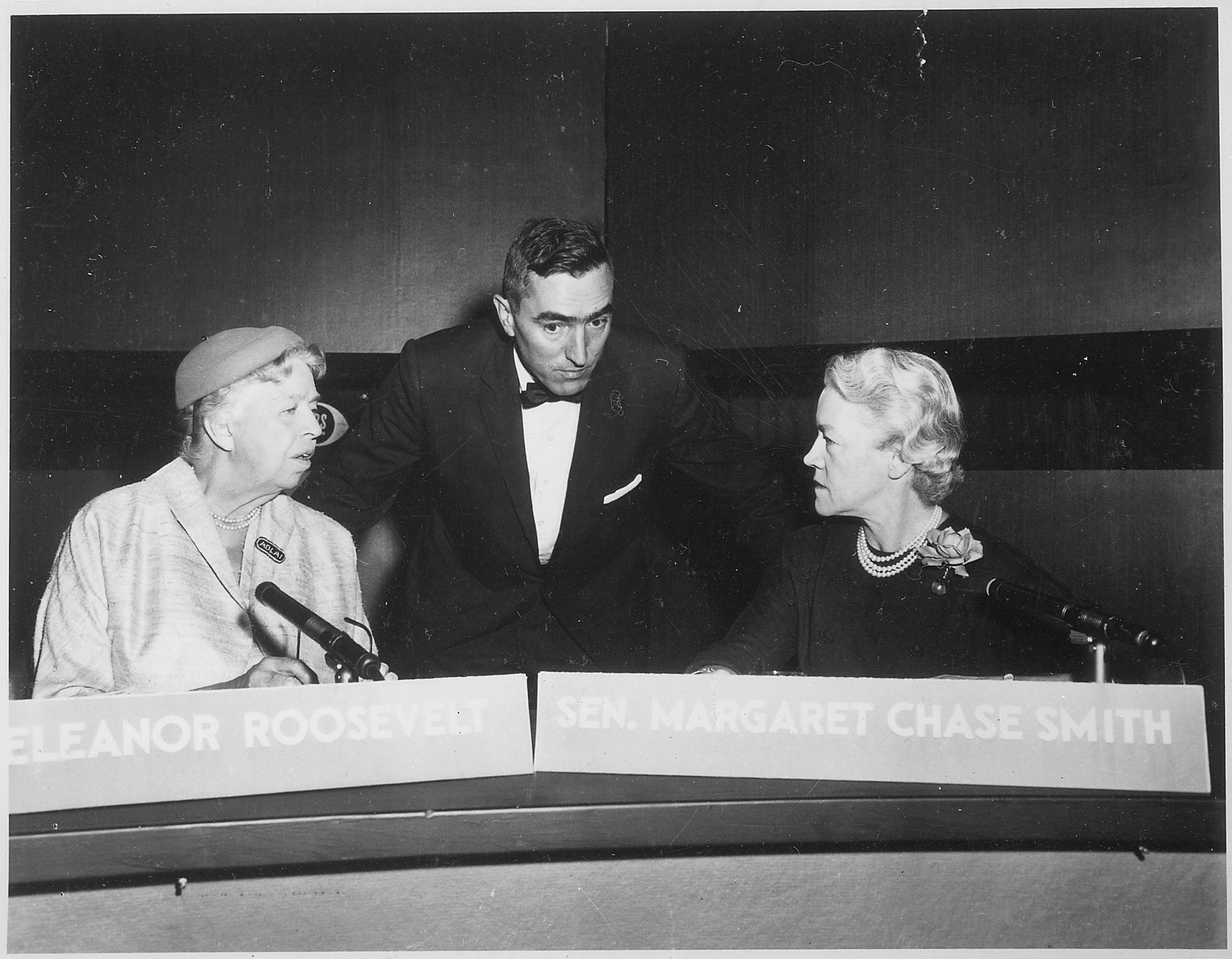
- Eleanor Roosevelt and Margaret Chase Smith
- Established: 1990
- Location: Bernard D. Katz Library; University of Maine; 46 University Drive; Augusta, Maine 04330
- Coordinates: 44.342902°N 69.795604°W

The Maine Women's Hall of Fame was created in 1990 to honor the achievements of women associated with the U.S. state of Maine. The induction ceremonies are held each year during March, designated as Women's History Month. Nominees are chosen by the public via an online nomination form. The University of Maine at Augusta displays the hall of fame in its Bennett D. Katz Library, and also hosts the hall of fame online at the university's website. The nomination form lists three criteria for eligibility:

1) Woman's achievements must have had a significant statewide impact
2) Woman's achievements significantly improved the lives of women in Maine
3) Woman's contribution has enduring value for women.

Nominations have a December deadline of any given year.

The first two inductees in 1990 were Mabel Sine Wadsworth and Margaret Chase Smith. Wadsworth had devoted her life to multiple issues, including maternal health and family planning, founding the Wadsworth Women's Health Center. She was a member of the board of Board of Directors of Legal Services for the Elderly, and helped raise funds for noteworthy organizations.

Margaret Chase Smith was the first woman elected to serve in the United States Senate. She ran for President of the United States in the 1964 Republican Party primarily, but lost out to Barry Goldwater. She was also the first Republican to speak out against the tactics of fellow Senator Joseph McCarthy, in her June 1, 1950 address on the floor of the Senate.

Two decades after its inception, the list of Inductees contains an Olympic gold medalist, Joan Benoit, two more United States Senators, Olympia Snowe and Susan Collins, and the mother of a Senator, Patricia M. Collins who herself had been mayor of a Maine city. Geneticist Elizabeth S. Russell joined the list, as did the President University of Maine at Presque Isle Nancy H. Hensel. Author and Holocaust survivor Judith Magyar Isaacson has been honored by an induction into the hall of fame. With the 2011 inductees, the hall of fame had honored 35 women for their contributions to Maine and to the female population.

== Inductees ==
Maine Women's Hall of Fame
Name	Image	Birth–Death	Year	Area of achievement	Ref(s)
Alane O'Connor			2026	Addiction medicine	
Frances Perkins		(1880–1965)	2026	United States Secretary of Labor	
Nancy Fritz			2024	Former director of Homeless Initiatives	
Julia McDonald			2024	Physician	
Sandra L. Caron			2023	Professor and author	
Julia G. Kahrl		(1934–2025)	2022	Women's reproductive rights advocate	
Jessica Meir		(1977–)	2022	Astronaut, biologist	
Joyce Taylor Gibson			2021	Associate Professor of Leadership Studies at the University of Southern Maine	
Leigh Saufley		(1954–)	2021	Dean of the University of Maine School of Law and former Chief Justice of the Maine Supreme Judicial Court	
Joanne D’Arcangelo			2020	Feminist activist and political strategist, policy advocate and lobbyist, State House staffer, and non-profit leader	
Betty-Jane Stanhope Meader			2020	Thomas College professor, former state president of the American Association of University Women of Maine and the Maine Association of Family and Consumer Sciences	
Darylen McQuirk Cote			2019	Advocate for women's health, equality and education	
Janet Mills		(1947–)	2019	75th Governor of Maine	
Julia Clukey		(1985–)	2018	Olympic luger	
Cornelia Thurza "Fly Rod" Crosby		(1854–1946)	2018	Maine’s First Licensed Guide	
Ann Schonberger		(1940–2022)	2017	University of Maine Mathematics. One of the founders of the Women’s Studies Program at the University of Maine Orono	
Clara Swan		(1912–2017)	2017	President of Casco Bay College and a Husson College Business Professor	
Connie Adler			2016	Physician and women's health advocate	
Elizabeth Ward Saxl			2016	Advocate for victims and survivors of sexual assault	
Ellen F. Golden		(1946–)	2015	Senior Vice President at CEI (Coastal Enterprises, Inc.)	
Barbara W. Woodlee		(1946–)	2015	Retired president of Kennebec Valley Community College; chief academic officer for the Maine Community College System	
Laurie G. Lachance			2014	First woman president of Thomas College	
Patricia E. Ryan			2014	Executive director of the Maine Human Rights Commission and a founding member of the Maine Women's Lobby	
Lyn Mikel Brown		(1956–)	2013	Co-founder of Hardy Girls Healthy Women, activist, author, researcher and professor at Colby College	
Mary Cathcart		(1942–)	2013	Former Maine State Representative and State Senator; co-director of Maine NEW Leadership program of the Margaret Chase Smith Policy Center	
Mary Farrar		(1949–)	2012	Victims' advocate	
Ruth L. Lockhart			2012	Women's health advocate, women's rights activist, AIDS educator	
Susan Collins		(1952–)	2011	United States Senate	
Katherine O. Musgrave		(1920–2015)	2011	Professor Emerita of Food and Nutrition at the University of Maine; 2002 New England University Continuing Education Association Faculty Member of the Year Award	
Thelma C. Swain		(1908–2008)	2010	Philanthropist	
Sharon Barker		(1949–2023)	2009	Director University of Maine Women's Resource Center	
Karen Heck		(1952–)	2008	Advocate for women's issues	
Florence Brooks Whitehouse		(1869–1945)	2008	Women's suffrage	
Laura Fortman		(1954–)	2007	Deputy Administrator, Wage and Hour Division U. S. Dept. of Labor; former Executive Director of the Frances Perkins Center	
Dale McCormick		(1947–)	2007	Former Maine State Treasurer, served in Maine State Senate	
Chilton R. Knudsen		(1946–)	2006	Bishop of Maine, Episcopal Church	
Patricia M. Collins		(1927–2024)	2005	Mayor of Caribou (1981–1982), chairman of Maine Committee for Judicial Responsibility and Disability, and Catholic Charities Maine	
Judy Ayotte Paradis		(1944–)	2005	Maine House of Representatives	
Sharon H. Abrams		(1949–)	2004	Executive Director of the Maine Children's Home for Little Wanderers in Waterville	
Judith Magyar Isaacson		(1925–2015)	2004	Holocaust survivor, human rights activist, author of Seed of Sarah: Memoirs of a Survivor	
Nancy H. Hensel		(1943–)	2003	President University of Maine at Presque Isle	
Theodora J. Kalikow		(1941–)	2002	President, University of Maine at Farmington	
Linda Smith Dyer		(1948–2001)	2001	Co-founder of Maine Women's Lobby	
Chellie Pingree		(1955–)	2001	United States House of Representatives	
Caroline D. Gentile		(1924–2008)	2000	Physical education instructor	
Joan Benoit Samuelson		(1957–)	2000	American marathon runner who won a gold medal at the 1984 Summer Olympics	
Elizabeth H. Mitchell		(1940–)	1999	Maine State Senate	
Olympia J. Snowe		(1947–)	1999	United States Senate	
Lois Galgay Reckitt		(1944–2023)	1998	Executive Director, Family Crisis Services, Portland, Maine	
Ethel Wilson Gammon		(1916–2009)	1997	Founder, Washburn-Norlands Living History Center	
Mildred Brown Schrumpf		(1903–2001)	1997	Home economist, nutritionist	
Elizabeth W. Crandall		(1914–2005)	1996	Environmentalist, woman's issues advocate	
Marti Stevens		(c. 1939–1993)	1996	Theatre director, actress, director of Somerset County Basic Skills	
Eloise Vitelli		(1949–)	1995	Founded Women's Business Development Corporation, advocate for entrepreneurship for women	
Esther E. Wood		(1905–2002)	1994	Writer, teacher, historian	
Dorothy M. Healy		(1904–1990)	1993	College professor who, along with professor Grace A. Dow, established the Maine Women's Writers Collection; namesake of the Dorothy M. Healy Professorship at the University of New England	
Ninetta May Runnals		(1885–1980)	1992	Dean of Women at Colby College	
Gail H. Laughlin		(1868–1952)	1991	First practicing female attorney from Maine, first president of Business and Professional Women's Foundation, served in both the Maine House of Representatives and Maine State Senate	
Gilda E. Nardone		(1947–)	1991	Director of Maine Displaced Homemakers Program	
Elizabeth S. Russell		(1913–2001)	1991	Geneticist	
Margaret Chase Smith		(1897–1995)	1990	United States Senate, United States House of Representatives	
Mabel Sine Wadsworth		(1910–2006)	1990	Birth control activist	
