= Woodlee =

Woodlee is a surname. Notable people with the surname include:

- Barbara W. Woodlee (born 1946), American college administrator
- Zach Woodlee (born 1977), American choreographer and dancer

== See also ==
- Woodlea, Sleepy Hollow Country Club, Briarcliff Manor, New York
- Woodlea Historic District, Phoenix, Arizona
- Woodley (disambiguation)
- Woodleigh (disambiguation)
