= Ellen F. Golden =

American non-profit executive

- Born: Ellen Frances Golden; October 8, 1946 (age 79); Washington, D.C., U.S.
- Education: B.A. art history, Barnard College (1968); M.A. public policy and management, University of Southern Maine (1994)
- Occupation: Nonprofit executive
- Years active: 1978–2015
- Employer(s): Coastal Enterprises, Inc.
- Spouse: Duane Alan Paluska
- Parent(s): Gerald and Rose Golden
- Awards: Maine Women's Hall of Fame (2015)

Ellen Frances Golden (born October 8, 1946) is an American nonprofit executive specializing in micro-enterprise and women's business development. She was senior vice president of Coastal Enterprises, Inc. of Wiscasset, Maine, where she directed the Women's Business Center and CEI Investment Notes. She has testified before congressional committees on women's entrepreneurship and micro-enterprise development, and has sat on the boards of policy-making groups in these fields. She was inducted into the Maine Women's Hall of Fame in 2015.

== Early life and education ==
Ellen Frances Golden was born in Washington, D.C., to Gerald and Rose Golden. She completed her bachelor's degree in art history at Barnard College, and earned her master's degree in public policy and management at the University of Southern Maine.

== Career ==
In 1978 Golden joined Coastal Enterprises, Inc. (CEI) of Wiscasset, Maine, a nonprofit community economic development corporation that finances and supports small businesses and micro-enterprises created by and employing low-income residents of Maine. Starting as communications coordinator, she advanced to operations manager, project developer, senior program officer, senior development officer, and senior vice president. She directed the CEI Women's Business Center, established with seed funding from the United States Small Business Administration, which offers "business counseling, training, and access to financing" for women entrepreneurs, and was managing director of CEI Investment Notes, which furnishes loans for small businesses.

In 1986 she received a $15,000 grant from the Maine Bureau of Vocational Education to survey women business owners across the state and evaluate their needs. This led to the establishment of a series of seminars for women in business the following year, with the participation of Maine's technical college system. The survey also led to the 2007 publication of Telling Their Stories: Women Business Owners in Western Maine, a 62-page pamphlet detailing the history of businesses started by women entrepreneurs in the state. In 2004 Golden was one of six women selected by Women Impacting Public Policy to query United States presidential candidate John Kerry on the subject of women in business during a national conference call heard by 2,000 female entrepreneurs.

In her role as managing director of CEI Investment Notes, Inc., Golden organized investor financing in small businesses such as a restaurant venture by an Iraqi refugee couple, and farming operations for young people.

Golden retired in December 2015 after 37 years at Coastal Enterprises.

== Other activities ==
In 1994 Golden founded MicroNet, a Maine-based micro-enterprise association, "to share best practices, coordinate services, develop policy and train practitioners across New England in microenterprise development".

== Memberships ==
She has served on the board of directors of the Women's Development Institute in Augusta, the Women's Business Development Corporation of Bangor, and the Maine Women's Lobby. She was commissioner of the Maine Commission for Women from 1988 to 1992.

She is a founding board member of the Maine Women's Policy Center. She was a member of the board of trustees of Maine Initiatives from 1994 to 2000, and also served as president of that board. She sat on the board of directors of the Association for Enterprise Opportunity of Chicago from 1992 to 1996 and 1997 to 2000, and has chaired the Association of Business Women's Business Centers since 1998.

== Awards and honors ==
The United States Small Business Administration honored Golden as Women Business Advocate for Maine in 1987, Minority Business Advocate for Maine in 1994, and Minority Business Advocate for Maine and Region I in 2003. She received the 20th Anniversary Star Award from the Maine Centers for Women, Work and Community. She was inducted into the Maine Women's Hall of Fame in 2015.

== Personal life ==
In June 1983, she married Duane Alan Paluska, a custom furniture maker and contemporary artist. They reside in Woolwich, Maine.
