= Woodley =

Woodley or Woodly may refer to:

== Places ==
=== United Kingdom ===
- Woodley, Berkshire, a town and civil parish
- Woodley, Greater Manchester, a suburb
- Woodley, Hampshire, a United Kingdom location near Romsey

=== Elsewhere ===
- Woodley, Saskatchewan, Canada, a hamlet
- Woodley, Nairobi, Kenya, a suburb of Nairobi
- Woodley Island, island in Eureka, California, US

== People ==
=== Surname ===
- Allan Woodley (born 1935), Australian rules footballer
- Anita Woodley, American writer
- Bruce Woodley (born 1942), Australian singer-songwriter and musician
- Dan Woodley (born 1967), American ice hockey player
- David Woodley (1958–2003), American football quarterback
- David E. Woodley (fl. 1986–present), Australian actor, director and writer
- E.C. Woodley (born 1968), art critic, curator, artist, composer
- Fabian S. Woodley (1888–1957), British journalist, soldier, schoolmaster and poet
- Frank Woodley (born 1968), Australian comedian
- Ian Woodley (born 1960), English game show winner and professional poker player
- Ian Woodley (field hockey) (born 1963), New Zealand former field hockey goalkeeper
- Joe Woodley (fl. 2019–present), American college football head coach
- John Woodley (born 1938), Australian politician and church minister
- John Paul Woodley Jr., American politician
- Johnny Woodly (born 1980), Costa Rican footballer
- Kevon Woodley (born 1986), Trinidadian footballer
- LaMarr Woodley (born 1984), American football linebacker
- Lee Woodley (born 1976), nickname Young Mutley, British boxer
- Leonard Woodley (1927–2020), British pioneering barrister of Afro-Caribbean heritage
- Mike Woodley (fl. 1991–2018), American former college football head coach
- Raymond John Woodley, (1938-2002), Canadian Folk Singer The Travellers (Canadian band)
- Richard Woodley (born 1972), American former football player
- Shailene Woodley (born 1991), American actress
- Tony Woodley, Baron Woodley (born 1948), British trade unionist
- Tyron Woodley (born 1982), American mixed martial artist
- Vic Woodley (1910–1978), English football goalkeeper
- Wendy Woodley (born 1968), Bermudian cricketer
- William Woodley, governor of the Leeward Islands (1768–1771, 1791–1793) - see List of governors of the Leeward Islands

=== Given name ===
- Woodly Caymitte (born 1974), Haitian sculptor
- Woodley Lewis (1925–2000), American football player

== Transportation ==
- Woodley Airways, a small airline in Alaska in the 1930s–40s
- Woodley station (Los Angeles Metro)
- Woodley railway station, Stockport, England

== Other uses ==
- Woodley (TV series), an Australian TV comedy starring Frank Woodley
- Woodley Theatre, a former movie theater in Los Angeles, California

== See also ==
- Woodley Mansion, a historic residence in Washington, D.C.
- Woodley Park, Washington, D.C., a neighborhood
- Woodley Park (Los Angeles), a recreation area
- Woodlea, Sleepy Hollow Country Club, Briarcliff Manor, New York
- Woodlea Historic District, Phoenix, Arizona
- Woodlee, a surname
- Woodleigh (disambiguation)
