= Judith Magyar Isaacson =

Hungarian-American educator and university administrator

- 2006 book signing
- Born: Judit Magyar; July 3, 1925; Kaposvár, Hungary
- Died: November 10, 2015 (aged 90); Auburn, Maine
- Education: B.A. mathematics, Bates College (1965); M.A mathematics, Bowdoin College (1967)
- Occupation(s): Dean of Women and Dean of Students
- Years active: 1969–1978
- Employer: Bates College
- Known for: Survivor of Auschwitz concentration camp
- Notable work: Seed of Sarah: Memoirs of a Survivor (1990)
- Spouse: Irving Isaacson
- Children: 3
- Parent(s): Jeno and Rózsi (Rose) Magyar
- Awards: Maine Women's Hall of Fame (2004)

Judith Magyar Isaacson (July 3, 1925 – November 10, 2015) was a Hungarian-American educator, university administrator, speaker, and author.

Born in Hungary into a Jewish family, Isaacson was deported to the Auschwitz concentration camp with her mother and aunt in July 1944, where she spent eight months in forced labor in an underground munitions plant in Hessisch Lichtenau. After liberation, she married a United States intelligence officer and moved to his hometown of Lewiston, Maine. She earned bachelor's and master's degrees in mathematics in Maine colleges in the mid-1960s and taught at Lewiston High School and Bates College, serving as dean of women and dean of students at the latter institution. Her 1990 memoir, Seed of Sarah: Memoirs of a Survivor, inspired a 1995 electronic chamber opera and a 1998 experimental film.

The recipient of numerous awards and three honorary degrees, Isaacson was inducted into the Maine Women's Hall of Fame in 2004.

== Early life and deportation to Auschwitz ==
Born Judit Magyar in Kaposvár, Hungary, she was the daughter of Jeno and Rózsi (Rose) Magyar. She attended the gimnazium (high school) in that city and was valedictorian of her graduating class. Her plans to study literature at the Sorbonne were halted by the Nazi occupation of Hungary in March 1944. In May she and her family were incarcerated in a ghetto, from which her father and uncles were taken for forced labor. On July 2, 1944, one day before her nineteenth birthday, she was deported to the Auschwitz concentration camp with her mother, grandmothers, and aunts. While her grandmothers and one aunt were immediately murdered in the gas chamber, she managed to stay together with her mother and another aunt, Magda Rosenberger. Her father was transported to a Hungarian labor camp and from there to the Buchenwald concentration camp; at the end of the war, he died of starvation at the Mühldorf subcamp.

The three women remained at Auschwitz until late August 1944, when they were transported to Hessisch Lichtenau for forced labor in an underground munitions plant. In April 1945 they were transferred to the Tekla camp near Leipzig, where they were liberated by U.S. troops the same month. During their wait for a transport back to Hungary, in May 1945, Judith met Irving Isaacson, an intelligence officer for the U.S. Army Office of Strategic Services, who reportedly "fell in love with her on the spot". The couple married at the Nuremberg City Hall in December 1945, and Isaacson, a lawyer in private life, arranged for her, her mother and aunt to immigrate to his hometown of Lewiston, Maine the next year.

== Teaching career ==
Following the birth of her third child in 1960, Isaacson became interested in studying mathematics through a program on public television. She went on to attain a bachelor's degree in mathematics at Bates College in 1965, and a master's degree in mathematics at Bowdoin College in Brunswick, Maine, in 1967.

After earning her bachelor's degree, she began teaching math at Lewiston High School and chaired that school's department of mathematics. In 1968 she joined Bates College as lecturer in mathematics and computer science, becoming Bates' first computer science teacher. In 1969 she was appointed dean of women at Bates. During her interview, a member of the selection committee asked if she had ever resided in a dormitory, and she replied, "Yes, at Auschwitz". In 1975 she became the first dean of students at Bates. In the latter position, she successfully ended the "unequal and antiquated codes of social conduct for men and women", including a prohibition against students visiting the dorm rooms of students of the opposite sex, and improved the athletic opportunities for women students. She retired in August 1978.

== Speaker and author ==
Isaacson willingly shared her wartime experiences with students and friends. In 1976, while speaking to a group of students after the showing of a Holocaust film on campus, a student asked her "how she could smile after everything she had been through", and she did not have a satisfactory answer. That night, she dreamed of her Holocaust experiences, and began writing her memoirs the next morning. She revisited her Hungarian hometown to conduct research for the book, which was published in 1990 as Seed of Sarah: Memoirs of a Survivor. The epigram of the book contains a verse from Hungarian poet Endre Ady: All who live, rejoice, rejoice.

The book was later translated into German as Freut Euch Ihr Lebenden, Freut Euch (Rejoice, You Who Live, Rejoice) and into Hungarian as Koszonet Az Eletert (Thank You for Life). In 1991, Seed of Sarah was included on the New York Public Library list of "Books for the Teen Age". The book made Isaacson a popular speaker for schools, youth groups, and community groups throughout Maine. Although she planned to write a sequel, she did not find the time due to her speaking schedule.

In 1995 Mark Polishook composed an electronic chamber opera for one voice called Seed of Sarah, which was made into a 28-minute experimental film by director Andrea Weiss in 1998. Isaacson read portions of her book on the film soundtrack.

Isaacson recorded an oral history interview with the United States Holocaust Memorial Museum in 1993, and contributed a chapter on her life experiences to the 1999 book A Heart of Wisdom: Making the Jewish journey from midlife through the elder years, published by Jewish Lights Publishing.

== Memberships ==
She was a member of the Bowdoin College Board of Overseers from 1984 to 1996. She was also a board member of the Auburn Public Library, Central Maine Medical Center (CMMC), and the CMMC School of Nursing and Health Professions. She was a director of the Holocaust and Human Rights Center of Maine in the late 1980s.

== Honors and awards ==
Isaacson received honorary degrees from Bates College (Doctor of Laws, 1994), Colby College, and the University of New England.

She was a recipient of the Deborah Morton Award for outstanding women from Westbrook College in 1993, the Gordon S. Hargraves Preservation of Freedom Prize from Bowdoin College in 1996, the Maryann Hartman Award for distinguished Maine women from the University of Southern Maine, and the Remember Me Award from the Maine Healthcare Association. In 2003 she was honored as one of the Women of Distinction by the Kennebec Council of the Girl Scouts. In 2004 she was inducted into the Maine Women's Hall of Fame.

In 1987 she was a guest of the city of Hessisch Lichtenau, where she had been a forced laborer in a munitions plant during the war, on the occasion of their dedication of a monument to victims of the Holocaust.

== Personal life ==
Despite her wartime experience, Isaacson was "a warm and humorous optimist". Bates Holocaust professor Steve Hochstadt described her as "an extraordinarily joyous person who could tell you about very sad things that happened to her, her relatives and her friends, but who was able to retain joy in life". She was fluent in five languages: Hungarian, German, French, Latin, and English.

She and her husband Irving Isaacson, who survived her, had two sons and a daughter. She died on November 10, 2015, at the age of 90 at her home in Auburn, Maine.

== Bibliography ==
- Seed of Sarah: Memoirs of a Survivor. University of Illinois Press. 1990. ISBN 0252016513.
