= List of people from Hallowell, Maine =

The following list includes notable people who were born or have lived in Hallowell, Maine.

== Academics and writing ==
- Gorham Dummer Abbott, clergyman, educator and author
- Jacob Abbott, children's writer
- Martha Ballard, colonial midwife; her diary inspired the Pulitzer Prize–winning novel A Midwife's Tale: The Life of Martha Ballard, Based on Her Diary, 1785–1812
- George Baron, mathematician
- Elias Bond, missionary and teacher
- William H. Getchell, 19th-century photographer
- Hall J. Kelley, settler and writer
- Lilian Vaughan Morgan (née Sampson; 1870–1952), experimental biologist
- Emma Huntington Nason (1845–1921), poet, author, and musical composer
- Howard Parshley, zoologist
- Thomas Sewall, doctor, writer and professor

== Business and finance ==
- Thomas Hamlin Hubbard, general, lawyer, philanthropist and financier
- William Ladd, Ladd & Company founder
- Samuel Vaughan Merrick, manufacturer
- Thelma C. Swain, philanthropist
- Benjamin Vaughan, political economist, merchant and doctor

== Entertainment ==
- Abbott Vaughn Meader, political humorist

== Military ==
- Amos Stoddard, US Army officer (American Revolutionary War and the War of 1812)

== Music ==
- Supply Belcher, composer, singer, and compiler of tune books

== Politics and law ==
- Hiram Belcher, US congressman
- Joseph R. Bodwell, 40th governor of Maine
- Scott Cowger, state legislator
- George Evans, US congressman and senator
- John Hubbard, 22nd governor of Maine
- Dale McCormick, first openly gay member of the Maine state legislature
- Patrick K. McGowan, state legislator, candidate for governor
- Amos Nourse, doctor and US senator
- John Otis, US congressman
- James L. Reid, state representative and Maine Superior Court justice
- Daniel Shagoury (born 1981 or 1982), state representative
- Peleg Sprague, US federal judge
- Sharon Treat, state representative for Maine's 79th District
- Samuel Wells, 25th governor of Maine
- Reuel Williams, US senator

== Religion ==
- George B. Cheever, abolitionist minister and writer

== Sports ==
- Charlie Waitt, first baseman for the St. Louis Brown Stockings, Chicago White Stockings, Baltimore Orioles, and Philadelphia Quakers
