= Ruth Lockhart =

American health advocate, rights activist, AIDS educator and feminist

Ruth L. Lockhart
- Born: Ruth Louise Lockhart; Fort Fairfield, Maine
- Education: B.A. elementary education, University of Southern Maine
- Occupation: Health educator
- Years active: 1978–2015
- Known for: Executive director, Mabel Wadsworth Women's Health Center
- Spouse: Peter Thibeau
- Children: 2
- Parent(s): Charles J. Lockhart; Winnifred N. Durgin
- Awards: Maine Women's Hall of Fame, 2012

Ruth L. Lockhart is an American women's health advocate, women's rights activist, AIDS educator, and feminist. She is a co-founder of Mabel Wadsworth Women's Health Center, was its executive director in Bangor, Maine, from 1992 to 2015, and previously worked in health education and AIDS education for the City of Bangor and the University of Maine. She was inducted into the Maine Women's Hall of Fame in 2012.

== Early life and education ==
Ruth L. Lockhart was born in Fort Fairfield, Maine, to Charles J. Lockhart, a bank teller, and his wife, Winnifred N. Durgin, a home economics teacher. She has one brother and one sister. Growing up in an agricultural town, she worked as a "potato picker" in her childhood and teens.

She graduated from the University of Southern Maine in 1973 with a bachelor's degree in elementary education and a teaching certificate in special education and learning disabilities.

== Career ==
Lockhart worked from 1974 to 1978 as a special education teacher in an East Corinth, Maine, public school. She next volunteered as a receptionist for Penquis Family Planning, where she became a family planning specialist. In 1984 she became the director of the Sexually Transmitted Diseases Clinic run by the city of Bangor, serving as an educator and trainer in the areas of sexually transmitted diseases (STD), HIV, and AIDS. She was appointed to the Governor's Task Force on AIDS, and assisted in the creation of an HIV/AIDS antibody testing program for the city, which handled clients anonymously.

In 1987 she became the first professional health educator at the University of Maine. She co-chaired the rape and sexual assault awareness program, coordinated women's health services at the university health center, and engaged in AIDS education. She also started and ran the campus Sexual and Reproductive Health Education (SHARE) program and was a member of the lesbian/gay/bisexual concerns committee. Among the AIDS educational initiatives she oversaw were a peer education program employing students to talk to other students in dormitories, fraternities, and sororities; the distribution of thousands of condoms at AIDS workshops and at a permanent "AIDS table" at the university health center; and a "Love Carefully Day", which featured STD information tables in the campus gymnasium and the distribution of gift packets containing a carnation flower, a Hershey's kiss candy, and a latex condom for students to give to "that special someone". Lockhart got the idea from a similarly-named day aimed at preventing unintended pregnancies.

=== Mabel Sine Wadsworth Women's Health Center ===
In 1984 Lockhart and four other women's health activists founded the Mabel Wadsworth Women's Health Center in Bangor. The center, named in honor of Mabel Sine Wadsworth, a pioneering birth control activist and women's health educator in Maine, was formulated as a private nonprofit in response to President Reagan's enforcement of the global gag rule in 1984, which prohibited federally-funded programs from handling abortions. The center continues to rely on community donations to fund its operations.

After eight years of operating on a volunteer basis, the center named Lockhart as executive director in January 1992, a post she held until her retirement in May 2015. The center opened with the goal of promoting abortion rights and health care for lesbians, and was regularly picketed. In 1997 prenatal care was added to its list of services. By 2003, the center had serviced 2,400 clients. In 2015 Lockhart said that while they "proudly give abortions", approximately 70 percent of the center's activity related to obstetrics and gynaecology. Lockhart oversaw the center's relocation to a larger, 5,000 square feet (460 m^{2}) facility in Bangor in December 2005.

== Other activities ==
Lockhart served as chair of the Maine Choice Coalition.

== Memberships ==
Lockhart served as executive director of Big Brothers, Big Sisters of Aroostook from 1977 to 1978.

== Awards and honors ==
In 2000 the University of Maine honored her with its Maryann Hartman Award. She was inducted into the Maine Women's Hall of Fame in 2012.

== Personal life ==
Lockhart married Peter Thibeau in 1980, with whom she had two children. The couple resided in Bangor. Peter passed in 2022.
