= Elizabeth W. Crandall =

American academic and home economist (1914–2005)

Dr. Elizabeth W. Crandall
- Crandall in 1996
- Born: January 18, 1914; Columbus, Kansas
- Died: November 8, 2005 (aged 91); Brunswick, Maine
- Education: B.S. family economics and resource management, Kansas State University; M.S. family economics and resource management, Kansas State University (1939)
- Spouse: Robert Dalton Crandall
- Awards: Maine Women's Hall of Fame (1996)
- Scientific career
- Fields: Home economics
- Workplaces: University of Rhode Island

Elizabeth Walbert Crandall (January 18, 1914 – November 9, 2005) was an American academic, home economist, author, environmentalist, women's rights activist, and feminist. During her academic career, she was a professor, department chairman, and dean of the College of Home Economics at the University of Rhode Island, and authored textbooks and articles in the field of home economics. After retirement, she and her husband relocated to Brunswick, Maine, where she became active in environmental and women's causes. She was inducted into the Maine Women's Hall of Fame in 1996.

== Early life and education ==
Elizabeth Walbert was born in Columbus, Kansas, to Stanley and Edna Walbert. She had four sisters. She attended Kansas State University, where she was a member of Zeta Tau Alpha and earned her B.S. and M.S. degrees in family economics and resource management. She later earned her Ed.D. in sociology at Boston University in 1958.

== Academic career ==
By 1973 Crandall was a professor and chairman of the Department of Home Management at the University of Rhode Island. She was promoted to dean of the College of Home Economics at that college, retiring in 1979.

Crandall authored numerous articles and co-authored a key textbook on home economics.

== Environmental and women's rights activist ==
After retirement, she and her husband relocated to Brunswick, Maine, in 1979. There she became active in environmental causes, chairing the Brunswick Recycling Committee and promoting curbside recycling and household hazardous waste collection.

She also dedicated her efforts to women's causes. She assumed leadership roles in the American Association of University Women on the state, regional, and national levels. She was the state liaison for the AAUW's Legal Advocacy Fund from 1993 to 1995, advocating for cases of gender discrimination at institutes of higher learning, and was a legislative chair for the AAUW and the Maine Home Economics Association to combat discrimination against women, minorities, gays, and lesbians in housing, credit, employment, and public services. She served as president of the Brunswick chapter of the League of Women Voters and was a member of the Maine Women's Lobby, the National Organization for Women, and the Family Planning Association of Maine. She lobbied at the state and federal levels for welfare programs for women and children, as well as parent education programs and in-school child care for teenage parents who wished to continue their education. She also campaigned for the Equal Rights Amendment and joined the first Women's March on Washington.

== Awards and honors ==
She was the recipient of the 1987 Presidential Award given by the Maine Lesbian/Gay Political Alliance for Courage, Service and Integrity. She was inducted into the Maine Women's Hall of Fame in 1996.

== Personal life ==
She married Robert Dalton Crandall in August 1946. After their move to Brunswick, Maine in 1979, they became members of St. Paul's Episcopal Church in that city. Crandall predeceased her in 1999. They had no children.

== Bibliography ==
=== Textbooks ===
- Management for Modern Families. Appleton-Century-Crofts. 1954. 2nd edition – 1963; 3rd edition – 1973; 4th edition – 1980 (with Irma Gross and Marjorie M. Knoll)
- Home Management in Theory and Practice. F. S. Crofts. 1947. (with Irma Gross)

=== Selected articles ===
- "New Explorations in Home Management". Journal of Home Economics. 52 (8). American Home Economics Association: 637–642. May 1960.
- "Intellectuals on Trial". Journal of Home Economics. 52 (5). American Home Economics Association: 331–335. May 1960.
- "Home Management and a Theory of Changing". Journal of Home Economics. 51 (5). American Home Economics Association: 344–348. May 1959.
- "Newer Aspects of Home Management". Journal of Home Economics. 48 (8). American Home Economics Association: 631–634. October 1956.
- "The Family Manages Its Money". Journal of Home Economics. 40 (10). American Home Economics Association: 565–566. December 1948.
