= Woodleigh =

Woodleigh may refer to:

Places

- Woodleigh, Devon, England
- Woodleigh, Queensland, a locality in Toowoomba Region, Australia
- Woodleigh, South Australia, Australia
- Woodleigh, Victoria, Australia
  - Woodleigh railway station, Victoria, a nonoperational railway station on the Wonthaggi line in South Gippsland

Schools

- Woodleigh School, North Yorkshire, an English independent preparatory school located in the village of Langton, North Yorkshire, England
- Woodleigh School, New Zealand, a coeducational contributing primary school, in Frankleigh Park, New Zealand

Other

- Woodleigh impact structure, a large meteorite impact crater in Western Australia
- Woodleigh MRT station, a station on Singapore's Mass Rapid Transit system
- Woodleigh Replicas, a former park of miniatures in Prince Edward Island, Canada

== See also ==
- Woodlea, Sleepy Hollow Country Club, Briarcliff Manor, New York
- Woodlea Historic District, Phoenix, Arizona
- Woodlee, a surname
- Woodley (disambiguation)
