= Laura Fortman =

American government employee, non-profit executive and women's rights activist

Laura A. Fortman
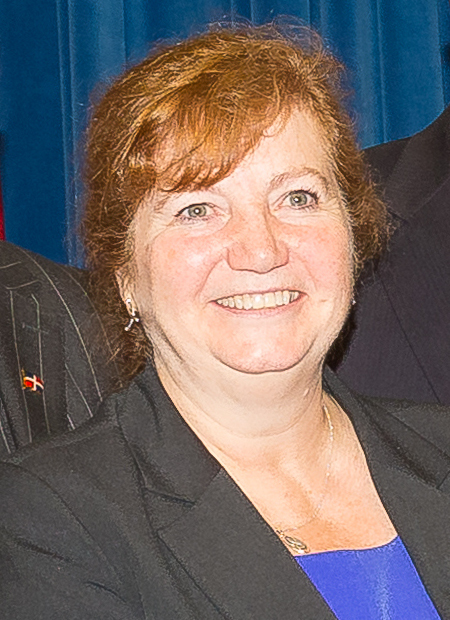
- Fortman at U.S. Department of Labor signing ceremony in 2014

Maine Commissioner of Labor
- Incumbent
- Assumed office January 2, 2019
- Governor: Janet Mills

Personal details
- Born: 1954 (age 71–72)
- Education: University of New Hampshire (BA); Northeastern University (MA)
- Occupation: Deputy administrator, Wage and Hour Division, United States Department of Labor
- Known for: Executive director, Maine Women's Lobby, 1993–2003; Commissioner, Maine Department of Labor, 2003–2011
- Awards: Maine Women's Hall of Fame, 2007
- Website: www.laurafortman.com

Laura A. Fortman (born 1954) is an American government employee, non-profit executive, and women's rights activist. Since 2019, she has served as the commissioner of the Maine Department of Labor, and she previously held that office between 2003 and 2011. She has also served as deputy administrator of the Wage and Hour Division at the United States Department of Labor in Washington, D.C., the executive director of the Frances Perkins Center, the Maine Women's Lobby, and the Sexual Assault Crisis and Support Center of Augusta. She was inducted into the Maine Women's Hall of Fame in 2007.

== Early life and education ==
Fortman was born in Brooklyn, New York in 1954. As a graduate of the University of New Hampshire, she went on to complete a certification course in Senior Executives in State and Local Government at the John F. Kennedy School of Government Harvard University. She earned her master's degree in leadership at the Northeastern University.

== Run for State Senate ==
In January 2018, Laura Fortman announced that she would seek election to the Maine State Senate in District 13 (Alna, Boothbay, Boothbay Harbor, Bremen, Bristol, Damariscotta, Edgecomb, Hibberts Gore, Jefferson, Louds Island, Monhegan Island Plantation, Newcastle, Nobleboro, Somerville, South Bristol, Southport, Waldoboro, Washington, Westport Island, Whitefield, Windsor, and Wiscasset).

In her race for the Maine Senate, she earned the endorsement of President Barack Obama, as well as organizations that represent, women, teachers, workers, and state employees.

== Career ==
Fortman dedicated the early part of her career to improving the lives of women and young girls, particularly working on policies that advanced support for victims of sexual and domestic violence. As a survivor of sexual assault, she ended up working as a direct service provider at the Women's Resource Center in Portsmouth, New Hampshire. When she came to Maine in the mid-1980s, she directed the Sexual Assault Crisis and Support Center and was a founding member of the Maine Coalition Against Sexual Assault.

As Executive Director of the Maine Women's Lobby and the Maine Women's Policy Center for over a decade, she represented women and girls in the Legislature, speaking to the full array of circumstances affecting women, including health care, reproductive rights, economic security, discrimination, and education. In the legislative and policy arena she helped to pass Maine's Reproductive Privacy Act, adding insurance coverage for contraception, contributing to a resolution requiring the Department of Labor to implement Maine's Equal Pay Act, Maine's Parents as Scholars program empowering welfare recipients to access higher education, the ground-breaking employment leave for victims of violence law, and unemployment insurance protection for part-time workers and for victims of violence, among many others. Through her leadership of the commission to Study the Unemployment Compensation System, the commission to Study the Costs and Benefits of Paid Family Medical Leave, the Maine Health Care Performance Council, and many others, she represented women in the policymaking process.

Governor John Baldacci nominated Fortman to be the next commissioner of the Maine Department of Labor in April 2003. Fortman assumed responsibility for 490 department employees and also chaired the Governor's Workforce Cabinet. During her tenure until the end of 2010, the gender pay gap was decreased and the state created more and nontraditional employment services for women. Afterward she served as an adjunct faculty member at the University of Maine at Augusta.

From October 2011 to May 2013 Fortman was the executive director of the Frances Perkins Center in Damariscotta. In June 2013 she was named deputy administrator of the Wage and Hour Division at the United States Department of Labor.

== Awards and honors ==
In 2001 Fortman was the recipient of the Maryann Hartman Award from the University of Maine. In 2010 she received the Frances Perkins award from the Lincoln County Democrats. In 2012 she received the Friend of USM Women & Gender Studies Award from the University of Southern Maine. She has also received awards from the Maine Women's Fund, the Maine Lesbian and Gay Political Alliance, and the Maine People's Alliance, and an honorary Doctorate of Humane Letters from the University of Maine at Augusta.

She was inducted into the Maine Women's Hall of Fame in 2007.

== Personal life ==
Fortman and her husband reside in Nobleboro.
