= Mary Farrar =

- Born: Mary Nicola; 1949 (age 75–76); Newark, New Jersey, United States
- Education: University of Maine at Farmington
- Occupation: Victims' advocate
- Years active: 1990–2011
- Employer(s): Somerset County District Attorney's Office; Maine Attorney General's Office; Maine Department of Corrections
- Spouse: Bob Farrar
- Children: 1
- Awards: Maine Women's Hall of Fame, 2012

Mary Farrar (born 1949) is a retired American victims' advocate. She worked exclusively with families of homicide victims for the Maine Attorney General's Office from 1996 to 2009, and advocated for crime victims for the Somerset County District Attorney's Office and the Maine Department of Corrections. She was inducted into the Maine Women's Hall of Fame in 2012.

== Biography ==
Mary Nicola grew up in Newark, New Jersey, where her family owned a scrap metal business. She attended the University of Maine at Farmington.

In 1974 her older brother, William Nicola, was shot and killed during a robbery at the family business, leaving a widow and four children. Farrar and her husband decided to relocate to Maine, "seeking a sense of safety".

Having worked as a substitute teacher and part-time bank teller, in 1990 Farrar applied for the position of victims' advocate at the Somerset County District Attorney's Office, where she advocated for both child and adult victims of sexual assault, domestic violence, and attempted homicide. In 1996 she joined the Maine Attorney General's Office to work exclusively with families of homicide victims, being one of two victims' advocates for the state. Her duties included notifying victims' families, helping families understand the autopsy report, assisting with funeral arrangements, preparing them for the trial and sentencing procedures, being their spokeswoman for the reading of victim impact statements, and helping them disengage from the criminal justice system after the case was closed.

In 2009 she joined the Victims Services department of the Maine Department of Corrections to assist in collecting restitution on behalf of victims and informing victims when convicted perpetrators were going to be released. She retired in October 2011.

== Other activities ==
Farrar served on the board of directors of the Maine chapter of Parents of Murdered Children. She helped organize the chapter's first Victims' Rights Week in 2006, and Maine's first National Day of Remembrance for Murdered Victims in 2007. She has been a member of several state panels, including the Maine Homicide Review Panel, the Maine Elder Death Review Panel, and the Maine Commission to End Domestic Violence and Sexual Assault, and has testified before committees of the Maine Legislature.

== Awards ==
In 2011 she received the Father Ken Czillinger Award from Parents of Murdered Children in recognition of her two decades of work as a victims' advocate. In 2012 she was the recipient of the United Valley Red Cross Real Hero Award, named Citizen of the Year by the Maine chapter of the National Association of Social Workers, and was inducted into the Maine Women's Hall of Fame.

== Personal life ==
She is married to Bob Farrar, an electrician. The couple has one daughter and resides in Solon.
