= Ninetta May Runnals =

American academic and administrator

- Runnals in 1960
- Born: January 14, 1885; Dover-Foxcroft, Maine
- Died: June 1, 1980 (aged 95); Waterville, Maine
- Education: B.S. mathematics, Colby College, 1908; M.A., Columbia University, 1920
- Occupation: Dean of Women
- Years active: 1920–1926; 1928–1949
- Employer: Colby College
- Successor: Barbara Sherman
- Parent(s): William Frank Runnals; Ida Jane Bowker Runnals
- Awards: Maine Women's Hall of Fame, 1992

Ninetta May "Nettie" Runnals (January 14, 1885 – June 1, 1980) was an American academic and college administrator. She served as Dean of Women at Colby College in Waterville, Maine, her alma mater, for 27 years, advocating for gender equality for women students and faculty members. She also helped raise significant funding for a Women's Union on the Mayflower Hill campus, which was renamed Runnals Union in her honor in 1959. She was inducted into the Maine Women's Hall of Fame in 1992.

== Early life and education ==
Ninetta May Runnals was born on January 14, 1885, in Dover-Foxcroft, Maine, to William Frank Runnals and his wife, Ida Jane Bowker Runnals. Her father was a machinist in a nearby mill. She earned her bachelor's degree in mathematics at Colby College in 1908.

== Career ==
Runnals was a math and languages instructor at Foxcroft Academy from 1908 to 1911. In 1911 she moved to the Maine Central Institute in Pittsfield, serving as Dean of Girls and mathematics instructor until 1916. She also taught at Miss Sayward's School of Girls in Philadelphia, Pennsylvania.

During this time, Colby College president Arthur J. Roberts contacted Runnals to interview for the newly created position of Dean of Women, writing, "I am writing to inquire if you would be at all interested in the deanship of women here for the coming year and the rest of your life". Runnals did not accept the offer at first, choosing instead to complete her M.A. degree at Columbia University in 1920. Afterward she told Roberts that she would accept his offer only if it included a full faculty membership and more latitude than the original job description allowed. Her demands were accepted and she became Dean of Women in 1920, as well as assistant professor of mathematics. In 1923 she gained a full professorship.

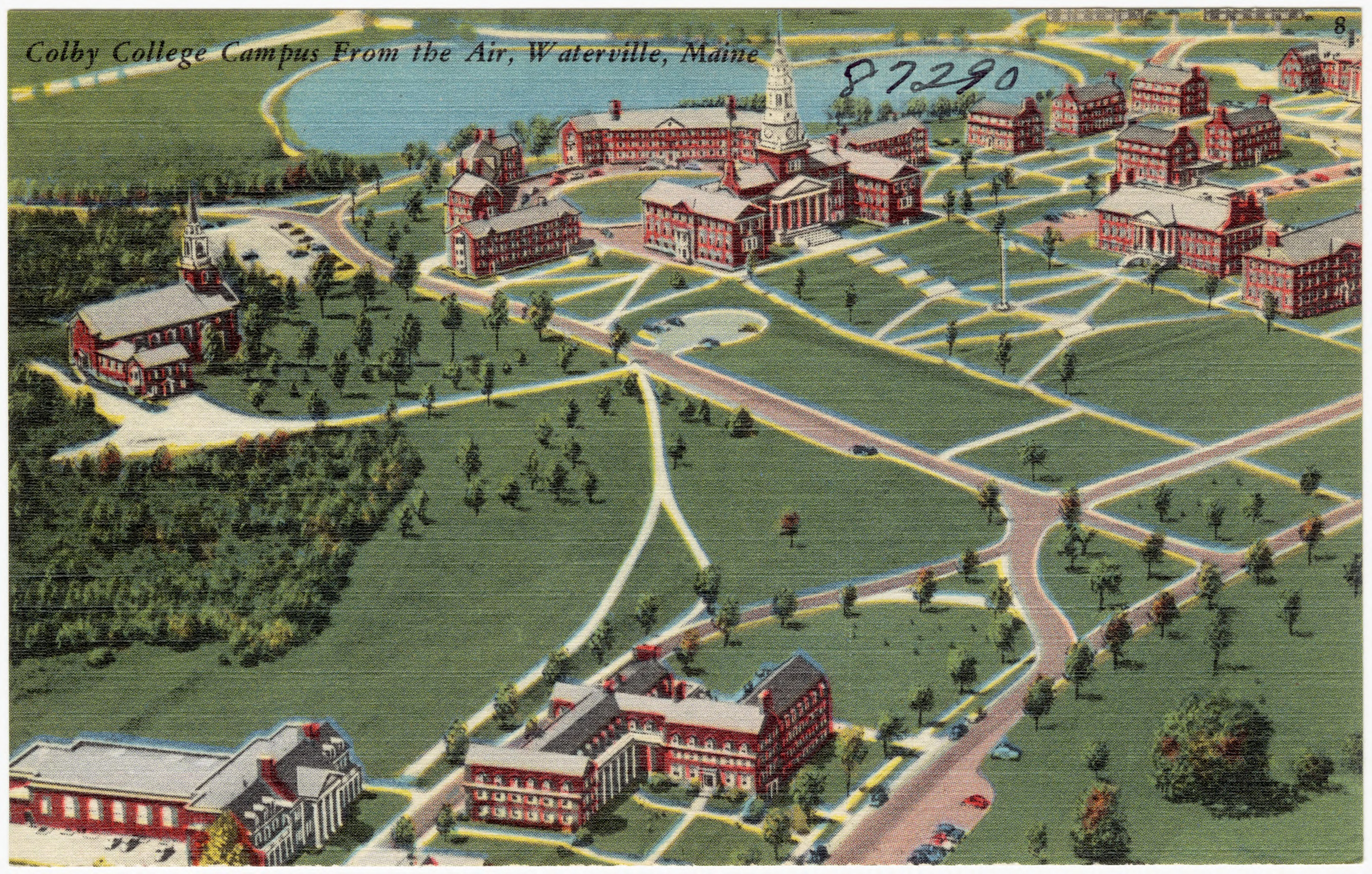
Aerial view of Colby College campus, circa 1930–1945

Cognizant of "the challenges of being a woman at Colby", Runnals advocated for "equal support of the women's division" from the very beginning. She opposed the division of Colby College into men's and women's campuses, arguing that women would receive the short end of the stick in terms of allocation of resources. Later she campaigned for coeducational classes. Within a year of her arrival, she had revamped the health and physical education program for women, replacing the "part-time, low paid supervisor for gymnastic activities" with a full-time nurse and a fully stocked woman's infirmary. She also organized the college's Women's Health League and lobbied for equal pay at the faculty level.

In 1926 Runnals became Dean of Women and associate professor of education at Hillsdale College in Hillsdale, Michigan. In 1928 she returned to Colby as Dean of Women and professor of mathematics and education. In the 1930s she led efforts to raise $100,000 from a total of 1,200 alumni for the establishment of a Women's Union on the new Mayflower Hill campus. In 1942 she oversaw the plans for women's dormitories at the Mayflower Hill campus, consulting with staff at other colleges and "comparing measurements of everything, down to closets as needed to accommodate 'modern party dresses'".

Runnals retired on September 1, 1949. Afterward she sat on the college's board of trustees for six years. She continued to be active with campus affairs, particularly those concerning gender equality, until her death.

== Other activities ==
Runnals established the Waterville branch of the American Association of University Women (AAUW). In 1973 the AAUW bestowed on her a citation for "developing quality education for women".

== Awards and honors ==
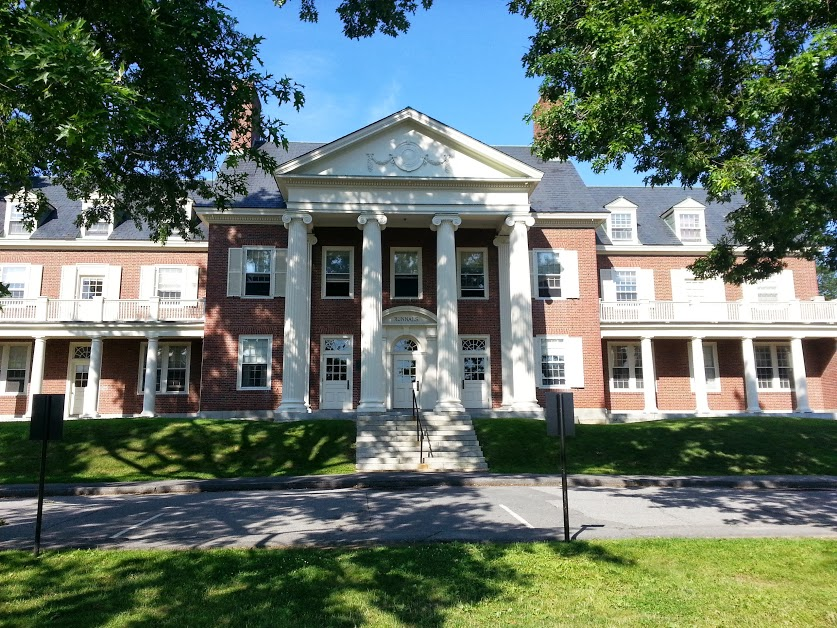
Runnals Union

In 1929 Colby College awarded her an honorary Doctor of Letters degree. In 1959 the college renamed the Women's Union building as Runnals Union in her honor. She was inducted into the Maine Women's Hall of Fame in 1992.

== Personal life ==
Runnals was a member of the United Baptist Church in Old Town, Maine. She died on June 1, 1980, following a lengthy illness, and was buried in her family's plot in the Gray Cemetery in Dover-Foxcroft.

Runnals was interviewed for her recollections of growing up in the late 19th century, her student years at Colby College, and the types of employment available to women in the early 20th century, by the Women in Maine Project of the Maine Folklife Center on October 23, 1974; the tape and transcript of this interview are housed at the Maine Folklife Center.
