= Patricia E. Ryan =

- Organization: Maine Human Rights Commission
- Title: Executive director
- Term: 1979–2011
- Spouse: Charles R. Priest
- Children: 2
- Awards: Maine Women's Hall of Fame, 2014

Patricia E. "Pat" Ryan is a human rights and women's rights advocate. She served as executive director of the Maine Human Rights Commission, a state agency tasked with enforcement of Maine's anti-discrimination laws, for over three decades. Prior to that, she chaired the Maine Commission for Women and the Maine State Personnel Board. She was a co-founder of the Maine Women's Lobby. She was inducted into the Maine Women's Hall of Fame in 2014.

== Career ==
Ryan began her career as a personnel administrator at Polaroid Corporation in Cambridge, Massachusetts. She next worked as projects coordinator for the nonprofit Center for Natural Areas, an environmental resource management company.

Ryan moved to Maine in 1973. That year, she assumed the role of statewide coordinator for the Maine Coalition for the Equal Rights Amendment. In 1974 Maine became the seventh state to ratify the amendment. In 1975 Ryan was appointed chair of the Governor's Advisory Council on the Status of Women, a post she held until 1979. During that time, she also served as chair of the Maine Commission for Women and chair of the Maine State Personnel Board. In 1977 she was appointed as chair of the Maine State Meeting, which crafted proposals for improving women's rights in advance of the 1977 National Women's Conference.

In 1978 Ryan and eight other women founded the Maine Women's Lobby, a group that lobbies for equal opportunities for women and girls.

In June 1979 she became executive director of the Maine Human Rights Commission, a state agency established in 1971 to investigate complaints of discrimination. The Commission tries to resolve these complaints by working with claimants, but if a resolution cannot be reached, the case is taken to court. Ryan anticipated that she would stay in the position for five years, but ended up serving for 32 years. During her tenure, the Commission saw an increase in the number and type of complaints, with disability, sexual harassment, age, race, and retaliation charges making up 95 percent of the Commission's caseload.

Following her retirement from the Commission in 2011, Ryan continued to volunteer as a mediator for that body. She also returned to the Maine Women's Lobby as treasurer.

== Other activities ==
Ryan has served as co-chair of the EEOC/Fair Employment Practices Agencies State & Local Programs Re-Engineering Committee and co-chair of the State Immigrant and Refugee Resettlement Task Force. She has been a board member of the Maine Women's Lobby, the Maine Women's Political Caucus, and the State Agency Advisory Board of the United States Department of Housing and Urban Development.

== Awards and honors ==
In 2015 Ryan received the Deborah Morton Award from the University of New England. In 2014 she was the recipient of the Roger Baldwin Award from the American Civil Liberties Union of Maine. Also in 2014, she was inducted into the Maine Women's Hall of Fame.

== Personal life ==
Ryan is married to Charles R. Priest, an attorney. Priest served a total of seven terms as a representative in the Maine House of Representatives as a Democrat representing the 63rd District. They have two daughters and reside in Brunswick.
