= Dorothy M. Healy =

American English professor and historian (1914–1990)

- Dorothy M. Healy in 1988
- Born: Dorothy Estelle Murphy; March 21, 1914; Boothbay, Maine
- Died: October 16, 1990 (aged 76); Portland, Maine
- Occupations: English professor; collections curator
- Known for: Co-founder and curator of the Maine Women Writers Collection
- Spouse: John Vincent Healy
- Children: 3
- Awards: Maine Women's Hall of Fame, 1993

Academic background
- Education: Bachelor's degree, Boston University, 1936

Academic work
- Discipline: English literature
- Institutions: Westbrook College

Dorothy Murphy Healy (March 21, 1914 – October 16, 1990) was an American educator, historian, and curator. She was Professor of English Literature at Westbrook College, Portland, Maine, where she also served in various administrative capacities. In 1959 she co-founded the Maine Women Writers Collection at the college and built the collection into one of over 4,000 volumes by the time of her death in 1990. She was posthumously inducted into the Maine Women's Hall of Fame in 1993.

== Early life and education ==
Dorothy Estelle Murphy was born in Boothbay, Maine, to Samuel Murphy and his wife, Abbie Gamage Murphy. She attended public school in Lynn, Massachusetts, and graduated from Boston University in 1936.

== Career ==
After graduation, Murphy secured a position as an English literature instructor at Westbrook Junior College in Portland, Maine. She remained at the college for over five decades, teaching composition and literature and also working in administration, including the posts of director of development and administrative assistant to the president.

Healy compiled historical data on the college, leading to her creation of the Presidents of Westbrook College Collection, which consists of memos, correspondence, and mentions about the presidents in publications and websites from the inception of the college in 1834 until 1996.

I don't think there is any state in the union that has such creative women as Maine does.

— Dorothy Healy

The idea for the Maine Women Writers Collection was sparked by a 1959 field trip taken by Healy and her colleague, Grace A. Dow, professor of literature at Westbrook, with their students, to view the Thomas Harding collection at Colby College. Dow suggested to Healy that they start their own collection of Maine women writers, and the idea was approved by Edward Blewett, Westbrook president. The collection received a $400 budget and its first acquisition was a volume donated by the Healys from their personal library: A Few Figs from Thistles: Poems and Sonnets by Edna St. Vincent Millay, a native of Rockland, Maine. Dow curated the collection until 1967, after which Healy took over as curator until her death in 1990. Seeking "novels, stories, diaries, journals, letters and memorabilia" of both well-known and obscure authors, Healy made connections with writers, collectors, and book dealers throughout New England. By the time of her death, the collection housed over 4,000 volumes by more than 400 Maine women writers and 200 related authors. The collection has continued to expand and, as of 2010, is a repository for over 8,000 volumes by more than 500 Maine writers.

Healy also conducted 50 to 60 public lectures annually based on material housed in the collection, and convened conferences, book debuts, and literary receptions at the collection's home in Westbrook College. In the course of her work, she befriended numerous Maine women writers, including May Sarton and Mary Ellen Chase. As a result of her personal connection with Healy, Sarton gifted her poetry library to the Maine Women Writers Collection.

== Other activities ==
Healy and her husband purchased the Bald Hill turkey farm in New Gloucester, Maine, in 1943. By 1949, they were raising an average of 3,000 turkeys annually, along with 800 pheasants and 50 Chukar partridges. They operated the farm until 1973, when failing health forced her husband to retire from the enterprise. In 1948 she was elected secretary of the Maine Turkey Growers Association, and in 1949, secretary and treasurer.

== Awards and honors ==
Westbrook College honored Healy with several awards and recognition, including the designation of Dorothy Healy Day in 1975, the Woman of Achievement Award in 1984, and the Dorothy Healy Scholarship Award. She received a Distinguished Service Award from Boston University in 1987 and an Achievement Citation Award from the Maine chapter of the American Association of University Women in 1990. She was posthumously inducted into the Maine Women's Hall of Fame in 1993.

After her death in 1990, the Dorothy M. Healy Professorship was endowed by Healy's long-time friend, philanthropist John Payson. Originally a visiting professorship, in 2007 it became a full-time faculty position in the Department of English at the University of New England (which merged with Westbrook College in 1996), combined with directorship of the Maine Women Writers Collection.

== Personal life ==
In October 1938 she married John Vincent Healy (1911–1979), a poet and literary critic. They had two sons and a daughter. Their youngest son, Thomas, committed suicide at the age of 26.

She died on October 16, 1990.

The Dorothy M. Healy Collection, 1900–1987, containing her notes and records of the history of the Westbrook College campus, is housed at the University of New England.
