= Charles R. Priest =

American lawyer and politician from Maine (born 1946)

Member of the Maine House of Representatives from the 63rd district
- In office December 6, 2006 – December 3, 2014
- Preceded by: John G. Richardson
- Succeeded by: Bruce A. Bickford

Member of the Brunswick Town Council
- In office December 2001 – December 2004; Chair: 2002, 2003
- In office 1993 – 1994; Chair: 1994

Member of the Maine House of Representatives from the 43rd district
- In office December 5, 1984 – December 5, 1990
- Preceded by: Stephen M. Zirnkilton
- Succeeded by: Sophia D. Pfeiffer

Personal details
- Born: Charles Randall Priest; February 7, 1946 (age 80)
- Party: Democratic
- Spouse: Patricia E. Ryan
- Education: Dartmouth College (BA); University of Maine (JD)

Military service
- Branch/service: United States Navy
- Years of service: 1967-1971
- Rank: Lieutenant
- Battles/wars: Vietnam War

Charles Randall Priest (born February 7, 1946) is an American lawyer and politician.

== Biography ==
=== Early life and education ===
From Brunswick, Maine, Priest received his bachelor's degree from Dartmouth College and his J.D. degree from University of Maine School of Law.

=== Military service ===
He served in the United States Navy as a lieutenant, in Vietnam, from 1967 to 1971. He was an Anti Submarine Warfare and Gunnery Officer, served as an advisor to the Military Assistance Command, Vietnam, and served as a crew member aboard two Vietnamese ships.

=== Legal and political career ===
From 1974 to 1979 he served as the Assistant Director of the Office of Legislative Research within the Maine Legislature. From 1979 to 1984 he was an associate and later partner at the law firm of McTeague, Higbee in Brunswick. He has owned his own law office in Augusta, Maine since 1984 and practices law there.

Priest served on the Brunswick Town Council from 1993 to 1994 and from 2001 to 2004. He served as Chair of the town council in 1994, 2002, and 2003.

From 1984 to 1990 and from 2006 to 2014, Priest served in the Maine House of Representatives and was a Democrat.

Since 2010 he has served as Chair of the Brunswick Sewer District in Maine. He is a former member of the Maine All Care Board of Directors.

=== Personal life ===
He is married to human rights and women's rights advocate Patricia E. Ryan and they have two daughters. The family resides in Brunswick, Maine.
