= Laurie G. Lachance =

American economist and college administrator

President of Thomas College
- Incumbent
- Assumed office 2012
- Preceded by: George Spann

Personal details
- Born: Laurie Gagnon Dover-Foxcroft, Maine
- Spouse: David Lachance
- Children: 2
- Parent(s): George V. Gagnon; Mattie Violette Gagnon
- Education: Bowdoin College; Thomas College
- Awards: Maine Women's Hall of Fame (2014)

Laurie Gagnon Lachance is an American economist and college administrator. Since 2012, she has been the president of Thomas College in Waterville, Maine, and is the first woman to fill that post. She was previously the first woman Maine State Economist and the first woman president of the Maine Development Foundation. She was inducted into the Maine Women's Hall of Fame in 2014.

== Early life and education ==
Laurie Gagnon was born in Dover-Foxcroft, Maine, the daughter of George V. Gagnon and Mattie Violette Gagnon. She has two sisters.

She graduated from Foxcroft Academy in 1979. While her father encouraged her to attend college, she did so without having any particular career in mind. Enrolling at Bowdoin College in 1979, she decided to major in economics "because I couldn't get the math course I wanted". She traveled to Austria between her junior and senior years as an American Field Service Intercultural Programs student. She credits her stay in Austria and her experience living at Bowdoin College as broadening her outlook beyond her small-town upbringing. In 1983 she graduated from Bowdoin with a bachelor's degree in economics.

After graduation, she began working as an economic analyst and, later, corporate economist for Central Maine Power while pursuing her business degree at Thomas College. She attained her MBA in 1992. In 2012 she was awarded an honorary Doctor of Humane Letters from the University of Maine at Presque Isle.

== Career ==
In August 1993 she became State Economist for the Maine State Planning Office, a position she held until October 2004. She was the first woman to hold this position, and her tenure spanned the terms of three governors, John R. McKernan, Jr., Angus King, and John Baldacci. During this time, she also chaired the Maine State Revenue Forecasting Commission.

In October 2004 Lachance was named president and CEO of the Maine Development Foundation, a state-chartered non-profit membership organization.

As part of her job, she began researching higher education and decided to join several college and university boards. She joined the board of trustees of Thomas College in 2010. In 2012, when Thomas College was conducting a search for a new president, someone asked if Lachance was also being considered and the search committee solicited her application. In 2012 she became the fifth president of Thomas College. She is the first woman and first alumna to head the college in its 118-year history. One of her first undertakings as president was a $12 million capital campaign for new campus buildings, which was successfully completed one year ahead of schedule. In 2015, she promoted the creation of a "Central Maine hub" to increase enrollment in the region's four-year colleges.

== Other activities ==
Lachance is the chair of the Maine Independent Colleges Association and chair of Educare Central Maine, a Head Start program. She is a board member of Educate Maine and the Maine Economic Growth Council. She is a frequent speaker on Maine economics.

== Awards and honors ==
She has been the recipient of numerous awards, including the Kennebec Valley Chamber of Commerce Community Service Award (2011), the President's Award of the Maine State Chamber of Commerce (2010), and the Deborah Morton Award of the board of trustees of the University of New England (2009). She was a Margaret Chase Smith Distinguished Policy Fellow in 2008 and a Thomas College Distinguished Alumnus of the Year in 1995.

She was inducted into the Maine Women's Hall of Fame in 2014.

== Personal ==
She and her husband David Lachance, have two sons and live in Manchester.

== Selected papers ==
- "In Search of Silver Buckshot: Thirty years of economic development in Maine" (PDF). The Brookings Institution. October 2006.
- "Ready or Not—Here They Come!". Maine Policy Review. 12 (2): 70–74. 2003.
- "Maine's Investment Imperative". Maine Policy Review. 11 (2): 60–78. 2002.
- "Presentation of Laurie G. Lachance, State Economist to the Maine Policy Leaders Academy". Maine State Planning Office. January 12, 2000.
- "The Maine Economy: Facing the challenge". Maine Policy Review. 5 (1): 75–81. 1996.
