= Gilda E. Nardone =

American women's employment advocate

- Born: Presque Isle, Maine
- Occupations: Nonprofit director, women's employment advocate
- Years active: 1978—present
- Employer: New Ventures Maine
- Awards: Maine Women's Hall of Fame, 1991

Gilda E. Nardone is an American women's employment advocate and nonprofit director. She is the executive director of New Ventures Maine, a career counseling and employment development program for middle-aged and older women who have been thrust into the role of family breadwinner due to the death or disability of a spouse, divorce, or separation. Nardone has been one of the directors of the organization, headquartered at the University of Maine at Augusta, since its inception as the Maine Displaced Homemakers Program in 1978. She was inducted into the Maine Women's Hall of Fame in 1991.

== Early life and education ==
Nardone grew up in Presque Isle, Maine, United States, the daughter of Orlando Nardone and Sara (Sally) Culberson Nardone. She has one sister and one brother. Her father died suddenly of a heart attack in 1965, forcing her mother to re-enter the workforce after twenty years as a homemaker.

After graduating from high school in 1966, Nardone attended Westbrook College in Portland, Maine on a scholarship and graduated with an associate degree, entering the workforce as a secretary. In the 1970s, she moved to Cape Cod to work as a day care teacher, and earned her bachelor's degree through University Without Walls, run by the University of Massachusetts Amherst. She later attained a master's degree in educational administration at Wheelock College in Boston. At the age of 30, she returned to Maine to work in women's advocacy.

== Maine Displaced Homemakers Program ==
In 1978 Nardone co-founded the Maine Displaced Homemakers Program and became its director. The program, headquartered at the University of Maine at Augusta, assisted middle-aged and older women thrust into the role of family breadwinner after the death or disability of a spouse, divorce, or separation. These women were called "displaced homemakers" because their original goal had been to nurture their families in the home rather than enter the workforce. The program provided "prevocational training", employment counseling, job placement assistance, and a statewide toll-free information and referral line for job-seekers, and interacted with local, state, regional, and national organizations to increase employment opportunities and business development.

By 1993, 1,000 women annually were signing up for the program, and its budget had grown from $15,000 in 1978 to nearly $1 million in 1993. In the mid-1990s the program was renamed the Maine Centers for Women, Work and Community. In the 2000s it began widening its focus to meet the needs of women wishing to broaden their professional and business opportunities. By 2010, Women, Work and Community had set up 18 locations around the state providing individual career coaching and seminars on financial management and starting a business. In 2016 the program was rebranded as New Ventures Maine, with Nardone continuing as executive director.

== Awards and honors ==
In 2008, Nardone was named the Women in Business Champion by the Maine and New England chapters of the Small Business Administration. She is also the recipient of the 1989 Progress Award from the Maine Commission for Women, and the 1991 Maryann Hartman Award from the University of Maine Women's Studies Program. She was inducted into the Maine Women's Hall of Fame in 1991.

In 2015, a Gilda E. Nardone Scholarship Fund was established at the University of Maine at Augusta to assist university students who undertook a career development or business development training program through New Ventures Maine. In December 2021, she received the Merle Nelson Women Making a Difference Award from New Ventures Maine.
