= Katherine O. Musgrave =

American dietitian (1920–2015)

Professor Emerita Katherine O. Musgrave
- Born: Katherine L. Ogilvie; February 8, 1920; Allisona, Tennessee
- Died: June 20, 2015 (aged 95); Orono, Maine
- Occupations: Professor of food science and nutrition, registered dietitian, nutritional consultant
- Spouse: Stanley Dean Musgrave
- Children: 2
- Awards: Medallion Award, American Dietetic Association (2011); Maine Women's Hall of Fame (2011)

Academic background
- Education: B.S. nutrition, Maryville College, 1941; M.S. nutrition, Oklahoma State University, 1968

Academic work
- Discipline: Food science and nutrition

Katherine L. Ogilvie Musgrave (February 8, 1920 – June 20, 2015) was an American academic, registered dietitian, and nutritional consultant. She taught food science and nutrition at the University of Maine from 1969 to 1986, and after her official retirement continued teaching for close to three decades on the university's online continuing education website, educating thousands of students. During this time she also worked as a dietitian for three Bangor physicians, conducted nutrition workshops and corporate wellness programs across the state, and appeared on a weekly radio show speaking about healthy living.

A member of the American Dietetic Association for over 70 years, she was a two-time president of the Maine Dietetic Association. She received an honorary doctorate of science from the University of Maine in 2006 and was inducted into the Maine Women's Hall of Fame in 2011.

== Early life and education ==
Katherine L. Ogilvie was born in Allisona, Tennessee, to Walter William Ogilvie and his wife, Kathleen Smith Ogilvie. Her mother was a Latin scholar and both her parents were college-educated. She and her three brothers grew up in a farmhouse constructed by their grandfather in the 1860s. She credited her affinity to food and cooking to her mother, who did not enjoy cooking and therefore let her practice as much as she wanted in the kitchen. After graduating high school in 1937, she attended Maryville College in Maryville, Tennessee, graduating with a Bachelor of Science degree in nutrition in 1941. She interned at Vanderbilt University School of Medicine the following year, becoming a registered dietitian.

== Career ==
Following her internship, Musgrave joined the staff of the dietitian division of the Vanderbilt University School of Medicine. In 1945, she took up a position at the University of Alabama School of Medicine, followed by posts at Burnham Hospital in Champaign-Urbana, Illinois, and Cornell University School of Nutrition. In 1968 she earned her master's degree in nutrition from Oklahoma State University. After her husband was hired by the animal science department at the University of Maine in 1968, she began teaching food science and nutrition at the University of Maine as an assistant professor in 1969. She retired as professor emerita in 1986.

Following her official retirement in 1986, Musgrave continued to teach and speak full-time on nutrition issues for close to three decades. She presented her FSN 101 Introduction to Food and Nutrition course on the university's online continuing education website to more than 250 students per semester, offered a nutrition course at Penobscot Valley Senior College, and appeared every Monday morning on a WZON radio show speaking about healthy living. She also conducted nutrition workshops and the nutrition segment of corporate wellness programs in Maine and neighboring states, worked as a dietitian for three Bangor physicians, and educated patients at St. Joseph Hospital in Bangor about medical nutrition therapy.

== Writing ==
My feeling is if we can get children, in the first eight years of their lives, to like food and really appreciate food, they'll eat right the rest of their lives.

— Katherine O. Musgrave

Musgrave co-authored a 1984 nutrition textbook for teachers and parents. She also wrote a nutrition curriculum guide for elementary-school teachers at the behest of the Maine Department of Education, and coordinated nutrition classes reaching 2,000 teachers and school nutrition educators through the state's Nutrition Education and Training Program. She published a total of 29 papers in professional journals and produced bulletins on subjects such as "Food for Children, Nutrition Games, Snacking Patterns of Adolescents, and Breast Feeding".

== Positions ==
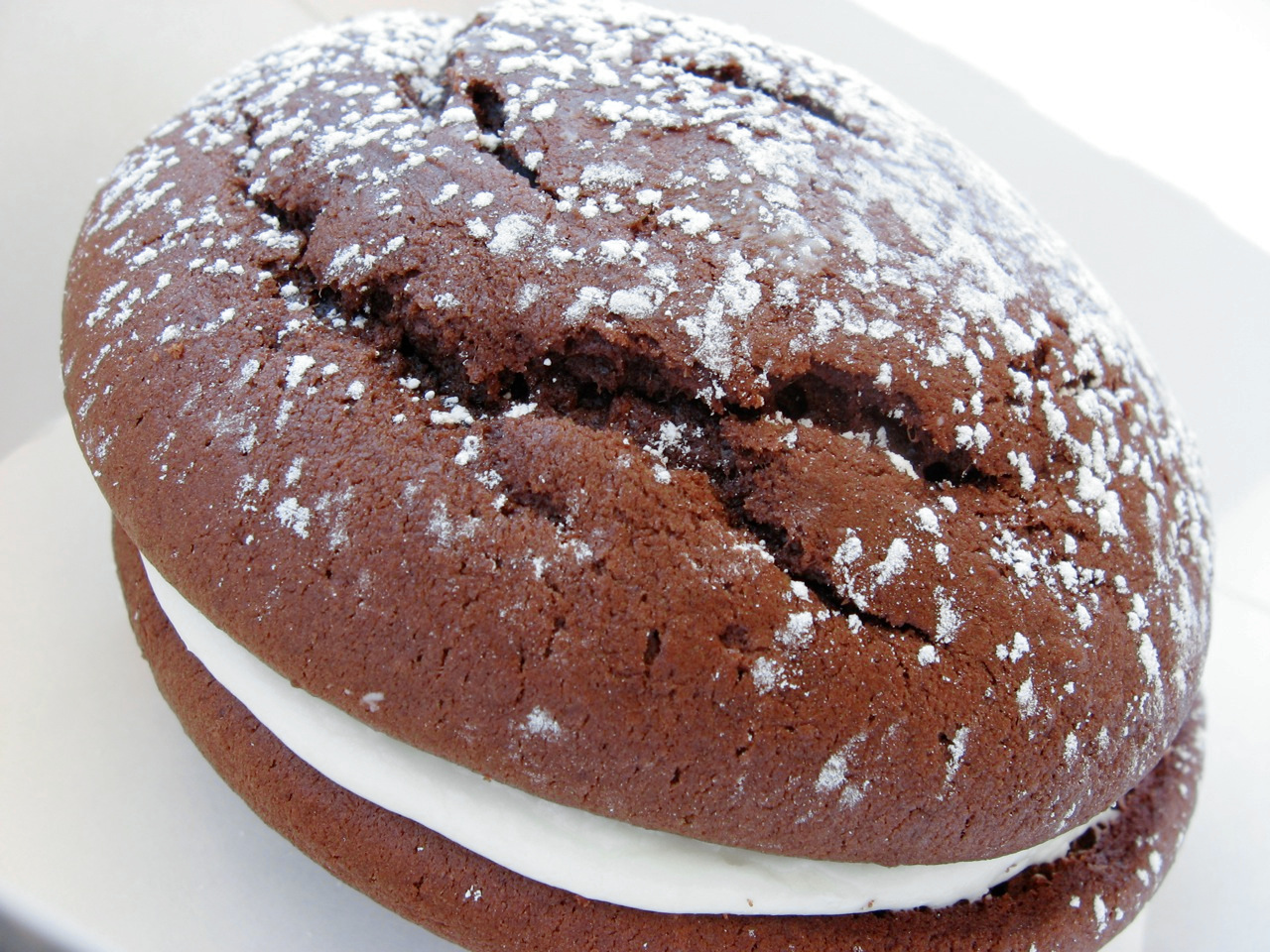
Whoopie pie

Musgrave was an outspoken critic of the Fit for Life diet. She subjected the weekly diet plan to a computerized nutritional analysis that found the levels of Vitamin D, Vitamin B12, zinc, and calcium to be "undesirably low" when compared to the United States Recommended Daily Allowance for women aged 23 to 50.

On the other hand, she spoke at a hearing in support of a 2011 Maine Legislature bill to declare the whoopie pie as the official state dessert of Maine. Musgrave praised the chocolate pie for being rich in flavonoids and antioxidants. Asked to clarify her position on the sugary dessert, she said, "In all food, moderation is the key word". The Maine Legislature eventually approved blueberry pie as the official state dessert, and the whoopie pie as the official state treat.

== Affiliations ==
Musgrave was a Fellow of the American Dietetic Association, having joined the organization in 1942 and retained her membership for more than 70 years. She served as president of the Maine Dietetic Association from 1973 to 1974 and from 2006 to 2007.

== Awards and honors ==
In 1995, Musgrave was the recipient of the Mary Ann Hartman Award from the University of Maine. She was named the 2002 Outstanding Continuing Education Faculty Member by the University Continuing Education Association, New England chapter. In 2011, she received the Medallion Award of the American Dietetic Association; that same year, she was inducted into the Maine Women's Hall of Fame.

In 1986, the Maine Nutrition Council inaugurated its Katherine O. Musgrave Award, which is awarded annually "for outstanding work in nutrition policy, education, or research".

In 2006, the University of Maine awarded Musgrave an honorary doctorate of science.

== Personal ==
She married Stanley Dean Musgrave (1919–2011) in March 1944. A veteran of the Army Medical Service Corps in World War II, Musgrave pursued a teaching and research career in "dairy and livestock reproductive physiology, nutrition, genetics, and management" at the University of Illinois at Urbana–Champaign, Oklahoma State University, and the University of Maine. They had one son and one daughter.

She died on June 20, 2015, in Orono. She was scheduled to teach another "Trends in Nutrition Education" course at the Penobscot Valley Senior College in the coming fall semester.

== Selected bibliography ==
=== Books ===
- Oliver, Shirley Doten; Musgrave, Katherine Ogilvie (1984). Nutrition: A Teacher Sourcebook of Integrated Activities. Allyn and Bacon. ISBN 0205080308.

=== Papers ===
- Storm, Deborah; et al. (1998). "Calcium Supplementation Prevents Seasonal Bone Loss and Changes in Biochemical Markers of Bone Turnover in Elderly New England Women: A Randomized Placebo-Controlled Trial". Journal of Clinical Endocrinology and Metabolism. 83 (11): 3817–3825. doi:10.1210/jcem.83.11.5289. PMID 9814452.
- Carruth, Betty Ruth; Musgrave, Katherine O. (1979). "Changing attitudes in community nutrition". Journal of Nutrition Education. 11 (3): 127–132. doi:10.1016/S0022-3182(79)80126-0.
