= Lois Galgay Reckitt =

American activist (1944–2023)

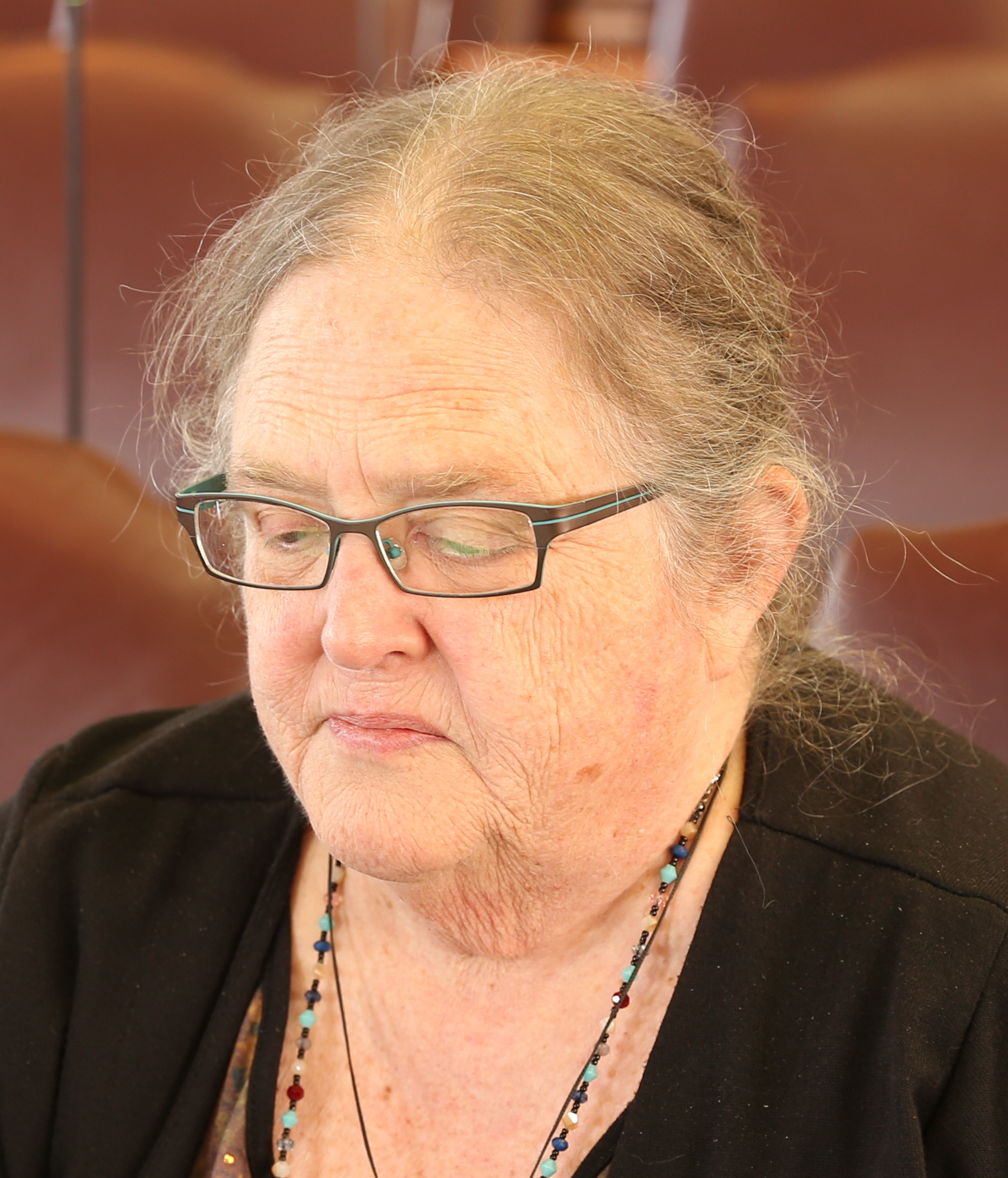
- Galgay Reckitt in 2017

Member of the Maine House of Representatives
- In office December 7, 2022 – October 30, 2023
- Preceded by: Michelle Dunphy
- Succeeded by: Matthew D. Beck
- Constituency: 122nd district
- In office December 7, 2016 – December 7, 2022
- Preceded by: Terry Morrison
- Succeeded by: Chad R. Perkins
- Constituency: 31st district

Personal details
- Born: Lois Galgay; December 31, 1944 Cambridge, Massachusetts, U.S.
- Died: October 30, 2023 (aged 78) South Portland, Maine, U.S.
- Party: Democratic
- Spouse: Lyn Kjenstad Carter (m. 2013)
- Children: 2
- Education: Brandeis University (BA); Boston University (MA)
- Awards: Maine Women's Hall of Fame (1998)

Lois Galgay Reckitt (née Galgay; December 31, 1944 – October 30, 2023) was an American feminist and activist. Called "one of the most prominent advocates in Maine for abused women", she served as executive director of Family Crisis Services in Portland, Maine, for more than three decades.

From 2016 until her death, she served in the Maine House of Representatives as a member of the Democratic Party.

From 1984 to 1987, she served as executive vice president of the National Organization for Women (NOW) in Washington, D.C. She was the co-founder of the Human Rights Campaign Fund, the Maine Coalition for Human Rights, the Maine Women's Lobby, and the first Maine chapter of NOW. She was inducted into the Maine Women's Hall of Fame in 1998.

== Early life and education ==
Lois Galgay was born in Cambridge, Massachusetts, on December 31, 1944, to George Alphonsus Galgay and his wife, Marjorie Lois Wright Galgay. Her parents were both polio survivors. She was an only child. She graduated from Watertown High School and went on to Brandeis University, where she earned her B.A. in biology in 1966. At Brandeis, she played on the women's basketball team and had her first taste of activism as a member of the Northern Student Movement. She earned her M.A. in marine biology and biological oceanography at Boston University in 1968. She later received certification as a notary public in the State of Maine.

== Career ==
Reckitt moved to Portland, Maine, after graduating from Boston University, being familiar with the state from summer vacations in her youth. She took her first job as a part-time instructor of marine biology at Southern Maine Technical College. From 1970 to 1979, she was the swimming director at the Portland YWCA.

Reckitt helped establish the Family Crisis Shelter in Portland, Maine, which was formalized as Family Crisis Services in 1977. In 2018, the organization was renamed Through These Doors. She served as executive director of Family Crisis Services from 1979 to 1984. In 1984, she moved to Washington, D.C., to an elected post as executive vice president of the National Organization for Women, a position she held until 1987. From 1987 to 1989, she was deputy director of the Human Rights Campaign Fund, a political action committee that she had co-founded in 1980.

In 1990, she returned to Portland and resumed the executive directorship of Family Crisis Services. By 2010, she was overseeing a budget of $1.4 million, with 30 staff members, three outreach offices, and a battered women's shelter. She lobbied for legal reforms to protect victims of domestic abuse, leading to the passage of "anti-stalking legislation, a domestic violence homicide review panel, and gun control measures for abusers". She often spoke at conferences and on panels in support of women's rights and LGBT rights. She was frequently quoted in newspaper reports on domestic violence and murder, and organized memorial gatherings for victims of domestic violence. In December 2013, following the murder of Matthew Rairdon in Westbrook, Maine, Reckitt urged attention to the issue of domestic violence in same-sex relationships. She retired from the executive directorship in October 2015.

Reckitt was elected to the Maine House of Representatives as a Democrat from South Portland (District 31) in 2016 and served until she died in 2023. She introduced the Equal Rights Amendment to the Maine House of Representatives in an attempt to have the state ratify it four times during her tenure.

== Other activities ==
In 1973, Reckitt co-founded the Maine chapter of the National Organization for Women; she also helped establish the Maine Right to Choose in 1975, the Maine Coalition for Human Rights in 1976, the Maine Women's Lobby, the Maine Coalition for Human Rights, and the Matlovich Society for gay rights and AIDS awareness.

== Memberships ==
Reckitt was a board member of the National Organization for Women (NOW) for 14 years and served on several NOW committees, including the national committee to end violence against women and the committee on pornography (which she chaired from 1990 to 1992). She served on the board of directors of the Maine Women's Lobby from 1979 to 1983, on the board of the National Coalition Against Domestic Violence from 2005 to 2014 (including two years as president), and on the board of the Maine Citizens Against Handgun Violence. She was an advisory committee member of the LGBT Collection at the University of Southern Maine. Her chairmanships include the Maine Coalition for Family Crisis Services and the Maine Commission on Domestic Abuse; she was vice-chair for the board of trustees at the Maine Criminal Justice Academy.

== Personal life ==
Galgay Reckitt was married twice to men. During her second marriage, she realized she was lesbian and came out in 1976 while in her early thirties. She lived with her wife, Lyn Kjenstad Carter, in South Portland. Galgay Reckitt had two children and five grandchildren.

Galgay Reckitt died from colon cancer on October 30, 2023, in South Portland, at the age of 78. After her death was announced, Governor Janet Mills and President of the State Senate Troy Jackson issued statements praising Galgay Reckitt.

== Awards and recognition ==
Reckitt received the Outstanding Contribution to Law Enforcement award from the Maine Chiefs of Police Association in 1996, the Advocate for Justice Award from the Maine Judicial Branch in 2001, the John W. Ballou Distinguished Service Award from the Maine State Bar Association in 2005, and the Deborah Morton Award from the University of New England in 2013. She was inducted into the Maine Women's Hall of Fame in 1998.

Reckitt is listed in Feminists Who Changed America, 1963–1975 and was named "Feminist of the Month – 2010" by the Veteran Feminists of America.

== Selected articles ==
- "We agree that some shouldn't have guns. Let's act on it for domestic violence victims' sake". Bangor Daily News. November 23, 2014.
- "Maine Voices: Portland Defending Childhood ready to buffer trauma's impact". Portland Press Herald. October 28, 2014. (with Julie Alfred Sullivan)
