= Nancy H. Hensel =

American academic and university administrator (born 1943)

- Born: 1943 (age 82–83)
- Education: B.A. theatre, San Francisco State University; M.A. theatre, M.A. early childhood education, San Francisco State University; Ed.D, early childhood education, University of Georgia
- Occupations: President, New American Colleges & Universities
- Predecessor: Lynette Robinson
- Awards: Maine Women's Hall of Fame (2003)

Nancy H. Hensel (born 1943) is an American academic and university administrator. She held faculty positions at the University of Toledo and University of Redlands before joining the University of Maine system in 1992. In 1992^{[6]} Hensel was appointed Dean of the College of Education at the University of Maine at Farmington.^{[11]} From 1995 to 1999 she filled the post of Provost and Vice President for Academic Affairs.^{[11]} In 1999 she was named to a one-year term as interim president of the University of Maine at Presque Isle, becoming the second woman to head the campus in its history.^{[1]} In 2000 she acceded to the presidency.^{[5]} In 2004 she was appointed CEO of the Council on Undergraduate Research in Washington, D.C., for seven years, and then became the first president of The New American Colleges and Universities in 2011. She has authored numerous books, articles, and monographs. Her research interests include early childhood education, gender equality, and work–family conflict and undergraduate research. She was inducted into the Maine Women's Hall of Fame in 2003.

== Education ==
Hensel earned her bachelor's degree in theatre from San Francisco State University and went on to attain master's degrees in both theatre and early childhood education from the same institution. She earned her doctorate in early childhood education from the University of Georgia.

== Academic career ==
Hensel worked as a lecturer and director of the Division of Elementary Education at the University of Georgia. From 1972 to 1977 she was assistant professor of early childhood education at the University of Toledo. She next moved to the University of Redlands in Redlands, California, where she became Department Chair and Professor of Education. She was a coordinator of early childhood education in 1979, and in 1987 directed the Elementary Experimental Summer School, in which primary school students were given access to the university's computer facilities, library, and swimming pool.

In 1992 Hensel moved to Maine and became Dean of the College of Education at the University of Maine at Farmington the same year. From 1995 to 1999 she filled the posts of Provost and Vice President for Academic Affairs.

In 1999 she was named to a one-year term as interim president of the University of Maine at Presque Isle, becoming the second woman to head the campus in its history. In 2000 she acceded to the presidency.

In 2004 Hensel moved to Washington, D.C. to become the CEO of the Council on Undergraduate Research, an organization with more than 600 college and university members which assists faculty in working with students on research. She held this post for seven years.

In November 2011, Hensel was named the first president of The New American Colleges and Universities, a national consortium of 22 selective, medium-sized (2,000–7,500 students) independent colleges and universities.

She retired from NAC&U in 2019.

== Writing and speeches ==
In her early career, Hensel wrote and spoke extensively on the work–family conflict for women faculty members in higher education. Her 1991 monograph on "the impact of maternity and child rearing on university tenure" was considered "groundbreaking". Her current work focuses on undergraduate research and she has written two books and several articles and monographs on the topic.

== Memberships ==
Hensel served as Commissioner of the New England Association of Schools and Colleges, was a trustee of the Maine School of Science and Mathematics, and was appointed by the governor to the Maine Economic Growth Council. She also chaired the Maine State Committee on Results Based Teacher Certification, which instituted standards for teacher certification.

== Honors and awards ==
She was inducted into the Maine Women's Hall of Fame in 2003.

== Personal life ==
Hensel is an avid sportswoman. She has skied the Tasman Glacier, trekked in the Amazon and the South Pole, and climbed Mount Whitney, Mount Kilimanjaro, and Mount Aconcagua – the latter at age 60 to raise funds for a new physical education center on the Presque Isle campus.

== Selected bibliography ==
- Course-Bases Undergraduate Research: Educational Equity and High-Impact Practice (Ed.) Stylus Publishers. ISBN 978-1-62036-780-3
- Exploring, Experiencing, and Envisioning Integration in US Arts Education (Ed.) 2018. Palgrave Macmillan. ISBN 978-3-319-71051-8
- Tapping the Potential of All: Undergraduate Research at Community Colleges (PDF). Council on Undergraduate Research. 2014. ISBN 978-0941933506. (with Brent D. Cejda)
- Faculty Support and Undergraduate Research: Innovations in Faculty Role Definition, Workload, and Reward. Council on Undergraduate Research. 2012. ISBN 978-0-941933-45-2. (with Elizabeth L.Paul)
- Transformative Research at Predominately Undergraduate Institutions. Council on Undergraduate Research. 2019. ISBN 978-094193333-9. (with Kerry Karukstis)
- Undergraduate Research at Community Colleges. Council on Undergraduate Research. 2009. ISBN 0-941933-29-6. (with Brent D. Cejda)
- Characteristics of Excellence in Undergraduate Research. Council on Undergraduate Research. 2012. ISBN 978-0941933490.
- Hensel, Nancy H. (20 January 2010). "Social leadership skills in young children". Roeper Review. 14: 4–6. doi:10.1080/02783199109553370.
- Realizing gender equality in higher education: The need to integrate work-family issues. George Washington University. 1991. ISBN 9781878380074. OCLC 24774517.
- Family Policy on the Community Level. ERIC Clearinghouse. 1990.
- Hensel, Nancy (September 1977). "Back to basics with block play". Early Childhood Education Journal. 5 (1): 36–38. doi:10.1007/BF02367542. S2CID 143724206.
- Evaluating Children's Development in Creativity and Creative Drama. R and E Research Associates. 1977. ISBN 978-0882474779.
