= Caroline D. Gentile =

Professor Caroline D. Gentile
- Born: January 24, 1924; Newton, Massachusetts
- Died: September 19, 2008 (aged 84); Presque Isle, Maine
- Occupation: Physical education instructor
- Title: Associate professor emeritus of education
- Awards: Maine Women's Hall of Fame, 2000

Academic background
- Education: B.S., Sargent College, 1946; M.A., New York University, 1949

Academic work
- Discipline: Health, Physical Education, and Recreation
- Institutions: University of Maine at Presque Isle

Caroline Doris Gentile (January 24, 1924 – September 19, 2008) was an American academic and physical education instructor. The longest-serving faculty member of the University of Maine at Presque Isle, she joined the staff in 1946 and developed the curriculum for the physical education department. She continued as a classroom instructor until her retirement in 2005. She also made the largest-ever gift to the university, a $500,000 donation toward the establishment of a health and physical education complex which was named in her honor. She was inducted into the Maine Women's Hall of Fame in 2000 and the Maine Sports Legends Hall of Honors in 2003.

== Early life and education ==
Caroline Doris Gentile was born in Newton, Massachusetts to Gerardo Gentile and his wife, Donata Bucchelli Gentile, both immigrants from Italy. She had four brothers and four sisters.

At Newton High School, she played field hockey, soccer, basketball, baseball, tennis, badminton, and bowling, and was named "most athletic" in her high school yearbook. She earned her B.S. from Sargent College, a unit of Boston University, in 1946, and her M.A. from New York University in 1949. She also pursued graduate studies at the University of Wisconsin and Columbia University.

== Career ==
In 1946 she was hired by the Aroostook State Normal School as an instructor for its Health, Physical Education and Recreation (HPER) program, at a starting yearly salary of $1,800. Gentile was one of seven staff instructors who revived the school, which had been closed during World War II. She developed the curriculum for the physical education department, which began offering a teaching degree in health, physical education, and recreation in 1949. The school went through various name changes until becoming known as the University of Maine at Presque Isle.

In addition to her teaching responsibilities, Gentile assumed leadership roles on campus. She helped establish the faculty union and served as its president on two occasions; she also twice served as president of the university senate. She chaired the HPER division for two decades. She directed the university's commencement exercises for more than 50 years. She retired on July 1, 2005 with the title of associate professor emeritus of education. She was the longest-serving faculty member at the University of Maine at Presque Isle.

=== Caroline D. Gentile Hall ===
In the early 2000s the university unveiled plans for a health and physical education complex for the campus. In 2002 Gentile contributed $500,000 toward the project, the largest gift the university had ever received. In 2004 the University of Maine's Board of Trustees announced that the facility would bear her name, an exception to the board's policy of not naming campus buildings after current employees. The $9 million, 45,000-square-foot (4,200 m^{2}) Caroline D. Gentile Hall opened in January 2006 with "a 25-yard (23 m) pool, 16 metres (52 ft) track, multipurpose courts, fully equipped fitness center and climbing wall", and classroom and laboratory facilities.

== Memberships ==
Gentile was a member of the National Federation of Business and Professional Women, filling the roles of local president, Maine State Federation president, and chair of "virtually all of its committees" since joining the organization in 1947. She was a two-term president of the Maine Association of Health, Physical Education, Recreation and Dance, from 1955 to 1957. She was a member of the Governor's Advisory Commission on HPER and the Maine HPER Curriculum Committee. She also served as publications director for Maine for the American Association of HPER and initiated the Maine Association of Intercollegiate Athletics for Women. She was a director of the Presque Isle Recreation and Parks Advisory Board.

== Awards and honors ==
In 1996, on the occasion of her 50th anniversary at the University of Maine, the university awarded her an honorary Doctor of Humane Letters.

Gentile received the Highest Praise Award from the Maine Association of Health, Physical Education, Recreation and Dance in 1999. She was inducted into the Maine Women's Hall of Fame in 2000 and the Maine Sports Legends Hall of Honors at Husson University in 2003, and received a Lifetime Achievement Award from the Presque Isle Chamber of Commerce in 2007. The Alumni Association of the University of Maine at Presque Isle established the Caroline Gentile Scholarship for students in the field of Health, Physical Education and Recreation, or Elementary Education, in her name.
