= Mildred Brown Schrumpf =

American author and educator

- Mildred Brown Schrumpf, c. 1989
- Born: Mildred Greely Brown; January 24, 1903; Readfield Depot, Maine, U.S.
- Died: March 2, 2001 (aged 98); Orono, Maine, U.S.
- Education: B.S. home economics, University of Maine (1925)
- Occupations: Home economist, food educator, food columnist
- Spouse: William E. Schrumpf
- Awards: Maine Women's Hall of Fame (1997)

Mildred Brown "Brownie" Schrumpf (January 24, 1903 – March 2, 2001) was an American home economist, food educator, and author. Named the "Unofficial Ambassador of Good Eating" by the Maine Department of Agriculture, she wrote a weekly food column for the Bangor Daily News from 1951 to 1994 promoting traditional Maine recipes. She was the main proponent of the claim that the chocolate brownie was invented in Bangor. She was inducted into the Maine Women's Hall of Fame in 1997.

== Early life and education ==
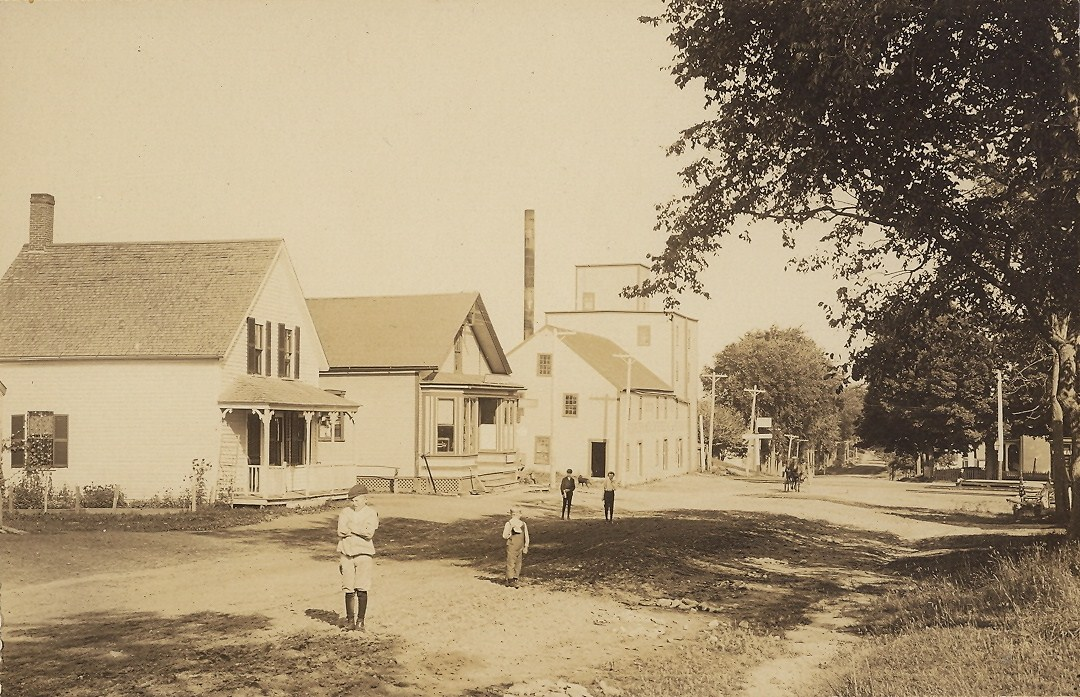
Readfield Depot, c. 1909

Schrumpf was born Mildred Greely Brown on a farm in Readfield Depot, Maine, to Fred Brown and Nellie Mabel Gordon Brown. She was a member of the Kennebec County 4-H club and won a canning contest in her teens. After graduating from Winthrop High School in 1921, Schrumpf attended the University of Maine – the first person in her family to go to college – and earned a bachelor's degree in home economics in 1925.

== Career ==
Schrumpf began her career as a tester for home gas stoves for the Bangor Gas Company. She next worked as an assistant leader in 4-H clubs statewide and as the Penobscot County 4-H club agent through the 1930s, updating home demonstrators on "food preservation, kitchen design and farm life". In the 1940s, Schrumpf worked for the United States Department of Agriculture Extension Service, giving demonstrations and classes and also teaching "camp cookery to forestry students". She also taught home economics classes at the University of Maine.

In the 1950s and 1960s, Schrumpf became the Maine Food Products Promoter for the Maine Department of Agriculture, and also did cooking demonstrations on television.

=== Food columnist ===
Maine's reputation for good cooking was not built on mixes.

— "Brownie" Schrumpf

Schrumpf began writing a weekly food column called "Brownie's Kitchen" for the Bangor Daily News on August 31, 1951. Each column opened with remembrances of life in 20th-century Maine and featured traditional recipes, using simple ingredients that could be found in any Maine grocery. Although she initially eschewed the use of ready-made ingredients, Schrumpf later printed recipes using convenience foods, which were included in her second cookbook collection, Memories from Brownie's Kitchen (1989). She continued producing her column until April 4, 1994.

=== "Bangor Brownies" ===
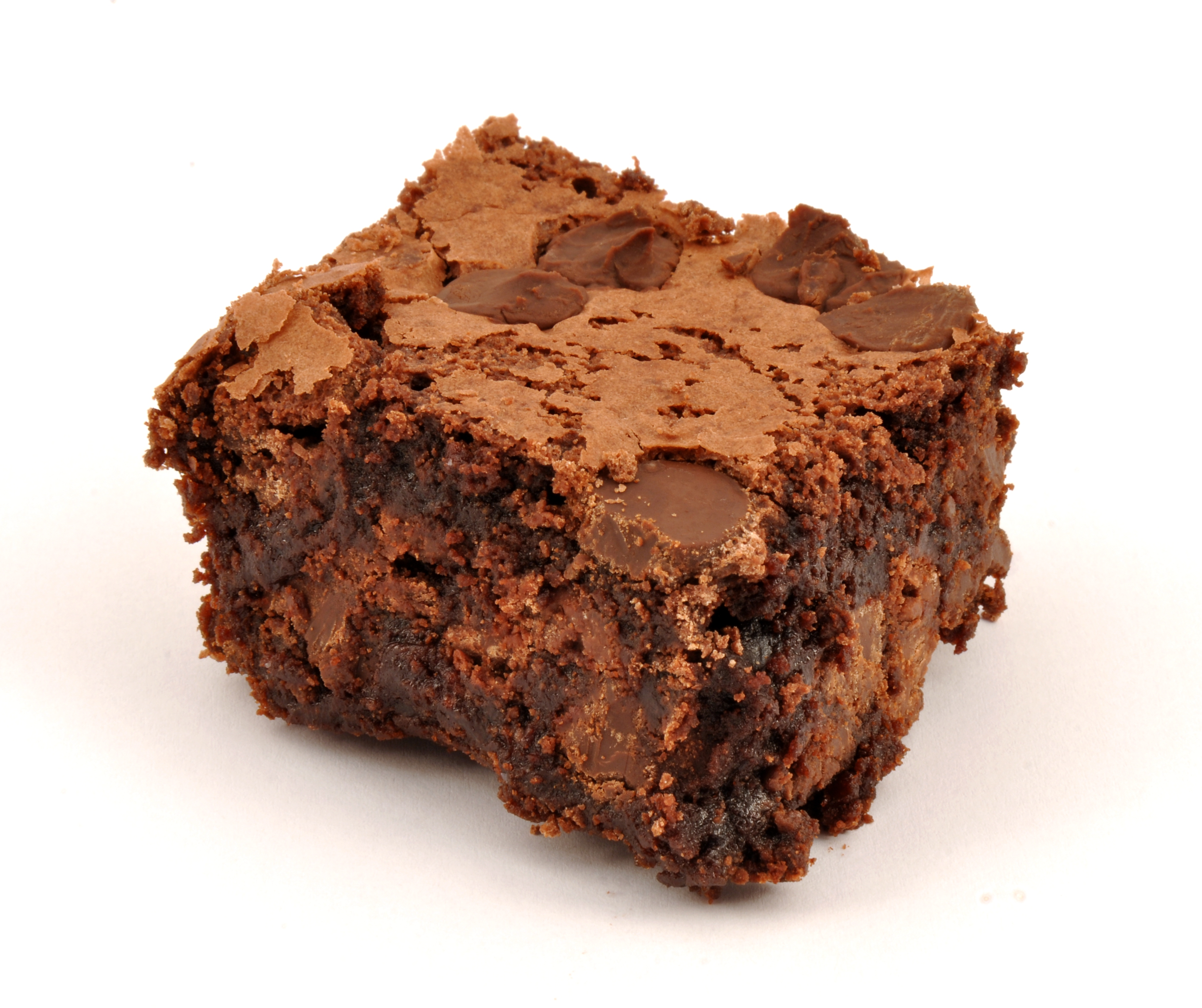
A chocolate brownie

Schrumpf received widespread publicity for her claim that the chocolate brownie was invented in Bangor, Maine. (Note: Numerous works erroneously credit Schrumpf herself as the inventor.) In its first edition (2007), The Oxford Companion to American Food and Drink refuted her premise that "Bangor housewives" had created the brownie. The Oxford Companion noted that while Schrumpf cited the inclusion of the recipe in the Girl's Welfare Cook Book published in Bangor in 1912 as proof of the brownie's origins, a Fannie Farmer cookbook published in 1905 already contained a recipe for the chewy chocolate treat. However, in its second edition (2013), The Oxford Encyclopedia of Food and Drink in America said it had discovered evidence to support Schrumpf's claim, in the form of several 1904 cookbooks that listed a recipe for "Bangor Brownies".

== Other activities ==
Schrumpf served as a judge for the Bangor State Fair and the national Pillsbury Bake-Off. She chaired the Maine Boiler Festival Chicken Barbecues and Luncheons, and headed delegations of Maine food demonstrators to the Eastern States Exposition in West Springfield, Massachusetts.

She maintained a lifelong association with the University of Maine and its alumni association, serving as class secretary for 40 years. She provided many artifacts for the "Brownie's Kitchen" exhibit, a replica of an early 20th-century farmhouse kitchen, at the Page Farm & Home Museum on the university campus.

== Honors and awards ==
The University of Maine alumni association awarded her its Black Bear Award in 1957 and Pine Tree Alumni Service Emblem in 1974. She was named Woman of the Year by the Maine Press, Radio and TV Women in 1968 and "Unofficial Ambassador of Good Eating" by the Maine Department of Agriculture in 1970. She received a Kiwanis Recognition in Service Award from the Orono-Old Town Kiwanis chapter in 1976 and an Achievement Citation Award from the Maine chapter of the American Association of University Women in 1989. She was inducted into the Maine Women's Hall of Fame in 1997.

== Personal ==
Known for her lively and energetic personality, she frequently answered cooking questions and shared recipe advice. As she advanced in years, her birthday celebrations were well-attended affairs that were said to "require traffic control"; for one "birthday bash", a 20-person committee coordinated the event.

She married William E. Schrumpf, an agricultural economist at the University of Maine Agricultural Experimental Station, in 1932; he predeceased her in 1976. In her final years, she resided in a nursing home in Orono, where she died on March 2, 2001, at the age of 98.

The Brownie and William E. Schrumpf Papers, including her extensive collection of Maine community cookbooks and recipe pamphlets, are housed in the special collections department of the Raymond H. Fogler Library at the University of Maine.

== Works ==
- Memories from Brownie's Kitchen: A collection of recipes compiled over thirty-seven years (2nd ed.). Bangor Publishing Company. 1989. ISBN 0962389005.
- The Flavor of Maine: Recipes in honor of the bicentennial. Bangor Daily News. 1976.
- "Maine's Own: Baked Bean Recipes". Maine Department of Agriculture. 1951.

== Sources ==
- Edgecomb, Misty (1997). "Museum Recreates Maine Between 1865 and 1940". Echoes: The Voice of Aroostook. Association of Aroostook Chambers of Commerce: 40.
- Sheraton, Mimi (2015). 1,000 Foods To Eat Before You Die: A Food Lover's Life List. Workman Publishing. ISBN 978-0761183068.
- Smith, Andrew F., ed. (2007). The Oxford Companion to American Food and Drink. Oxford University Press. ISBN 978-0199885763.
- Smith, Andrew F., ed. (2013). The Oxford Encyclopedia of Food and Drink in America. Vol. 2. OUP USA. ISBN 978-0199734962.
