= Thelma C. Swain =

American philanthropist (1908–2008)

- Swain in 2006
- Born: Thelma M. Cowey; November 22, 1908; Chelsea, Maine
- Died: April 19, 2008 (aged 99); Hallowell, Maine
- Education: Tufts University
- Occupation: Philanthropist
- Years active: 1993–2008
- Spouse: Vernon T. Swain
- Children: 1
- Parent(s): Stephen R. Cowey; Bessie Kirkwood Cowey
- Awards: Maine Women's Hall of Fame (2010)

Thelma Cowey Swain (November 22, 1908 – April 19, 2008) was an American philanthropist. She contributed significant funds to non-profit organizations in Maine and also established scholarships at Middlebury College, Tufts University, and at each of the seven colleges of the Maine Community College System. In 2010, her estate bequeathed $1 million to The Foundation for Maine's Community Colleges. She was posthumously inducted into the Maine Women's Hall of Fame in 2010.

== Early life and marriage ==
She was born Thelma M. Cowey in Chelsea, Maine, the daughter of Stephen R. Cowey and Bessie Kirkwood Cowey. She was an only child. During her youth her family moved numerous times as her father worked as the head gardener on estates in Walpole and Nashua, New Hampshire; Norfolk, Virginia; and York Harbor, Maine. She graduated from York High School in 1927 and earned an undergraduate degree at Tufts University in 1931.

Following graduation, she worked for the Public Service Company of New Hampshire in Nashua as an appliance service representative. In January 1938 she married Vernon T. Swain and relocated to Waterville, Maine; in 1949 they moved to Augusta. She assisted her husband in his home-based electrical engineering consulting firm, and also was a co-owner of an antique shop. Her husband died in 1993 after 55 years of marriage. They had one daughter.

== Philanthropy ==
After her husband's death, Swain dedicated herself to philanthropy. She contributed significant funds to the Gulf of Maine Research Institute, Portland Arboretum, Pine Tree State Arboretum, and the Pine Tree Society camp. She established a college scholarship for students in the Teen Parent School Program at the Maine Children's Home for Little Wanderers. She also volunteered weekly at the Maine State Museum in Augusta and supported the Norlands Living History Center in Livermore; in 2000 she donated "cotton sheets and sewing notions" to the living history museum.

Swain endowed several scholarships benefiting Maine students at Middlebury College in Vermont and Tufts University in Massachusetts. She also supported the seven colleges in the Maine Community College System, donating nearly $2 million between 1995 and 2010. She endowed the Thelma C. Swain Scholarship at each of the seven colleges, which is awarded to students in the nursing, residential construction, plumbing, or heating programs; and the Lloyd Duncan Scholarship, established in 1996 at Northern Maine Community College, benefiting seniors in electrical or electronics programs. In 2000 she was honored as Benefactor of the Year for New England by the Council for Resource Development in recognition of her support for Central Maine Community College and the Maine Technical College System. The latter system appointed her an honorary trustee emerita in 2001. In 2010, her estate made a bequest of $1 million to The Foundation for Maine's Community Colleges.

== Final years and legacy ==
In 2000 she moved to the Granite Hill Estates in Hallowell, Maine. She died on April 19, 2008, at the age of 99.

In 2008 the Norlands Living History Center inaugurated the Thelma Swain Award for Youth Leadership in Fundraising in her honor. She was posthumously inducted into the Maine Women's Hall of Fame in 2010.
