= Steve Hochstadt =

American historian

Steven Lawrence Hochstadt (born 1948) is a professor emeritus of history at Illinois College in Jacksonville, Illinois. He has done extensive research on Jewish refugees who fled to Shanghai. Influenced by his grandparents, Viennese Jews who fled the Holocaust and immigrated to Shanghai, Hochstadt conducted 100 interviews with former refugees living in the United States and Europe. Based on his studies he wrote several books about the Holocaust and especially about Jewish refugees in Asia. He is active in the Sino-Judaic Institute.

== Education and career ==
Hochstadt earned a bachelor's degree in mathematics in 1971 from Brown University, and later returned to Brown for his Ph.D. in history. His 1983 doctoral dissertation, Migration in Germany: an historical study, was supervised by R. Burr Litchfield.

He taught at Bates College in Maine from 1979 until 2006, when he joined the Illinois College faculty. He retired as a professor emeritus in 2014.

== Books ==
Hochstadt's books include:

- Mobility and Modernity: Migration in Germany, 1820–1989 (University of Michigan Press, 1999)
- Sources of the Holocaust (edited, Palgrave Macmillan, 2004)
- Shanghai-Geschichten: Die jüdische Flucht nach China (Hentrich and Hentrich, 2007)
- Exodus to Shanghai: Stories of Escape from the Third Reich (Palgrave Macmillan, 2012)
- A Century of Jewish Life in Shanghai (edited, Academic Studies Press, 2019)
- Freedom of the Press in Small-Town America: My Opinions (Atlantic Publishing, 2020)
- Death and Love in the Holocaust: The Story of Sonja and Kurt Messerschmidt (Academic Studies Press, 2022)
