= Thomas College =

Private college in Waterville, Maine, US

- Former name: List: Keist Business College (1894–1896); Morgan Business College (1896–1911); Morgan-Thomas Business College (1911–1950); Thomas Junior College (1950–1962)
- Motto: Those we Serve are the Foundation of Our Future
- Type: Private college
- Established: 1894; 132 years ago
- Endowment: $35.4 million (2025)
- President: Jeannine Diddle Uzzi
- Faculty: 80
- Students: 1,949 (fall 2019)
- Undergraduates: 1,819 (fall 2019)
- Postgraduates: 130 (fall 2019)
- Location: Waterville, Maine, U.S. 44°31′28″N 69°39′48″W
- Campus: Rural
- Colors: Red and black
- Sporting affiliations: NCAA Division III – NAC
- Mascot: Tommy the Terrier
- Website: thomas.edu
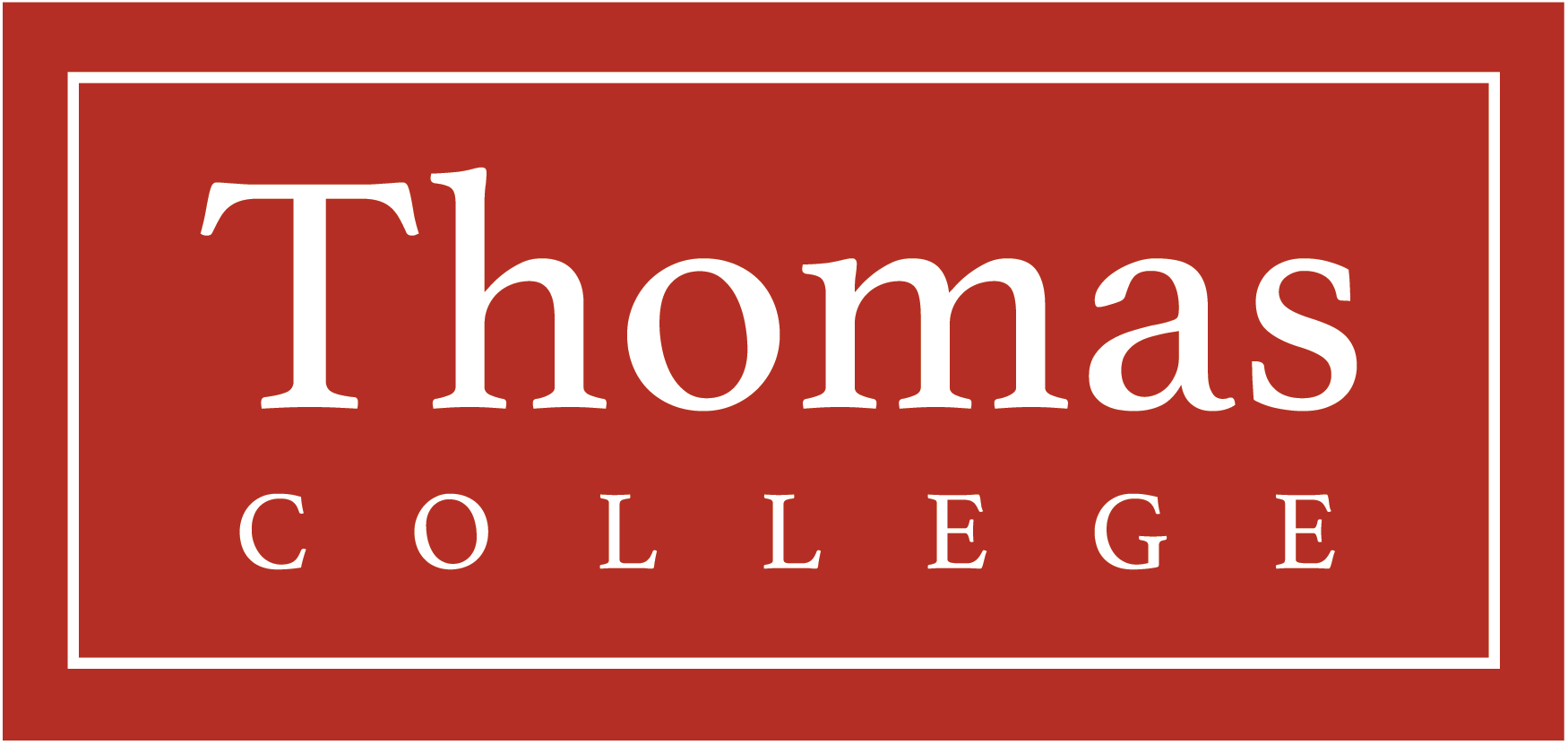

Thomas College is a private college in Waterville, Maine, United States. It offers undergraduate and graduate degrees and is accredited by the New England Commission of Higher Education. As of fall 2019 Thomas College enrolled 1,949 students; 1,819 were undergraduate students and 130 were graduate students.

== History ==
Keist Business College was established in 1894 when it was founded as a nonsectarian, co-educational college dedicated to career training. It was located on three floors above the F. W. Woolworth Company in the Edith Building on Main Street in Waterville. At the turn of the century, Keist Business College was purchased by William Morgan. It was renamed Morgan Business College in 1896.

In 1911, a Peterborough, New Hampshire, railroad administrator, John L. Thomas Sr., who himself was a business college graduate, purchased the college and renamed it Morgan-Thomas Business College. For half a century the college trained accountants and secretaries.

In 1950, the college was renamed Thomas Junior College and in 1956, the college moved from Main Street to the former home of John Ware on Silver Street.

In 1962, Thomas Junior College was renamed Thomas College. In 1963, the Maine State Legislature granted Thomas the right to confer four-year degrees and in 1964 the Mariner Library, named after Chairman of the Thomas College Board of Trustees, Ernest C. Mariner, was opened. In 1965, a theater for lectures and dramatic presentations was constructed, but towards the end of the decade, the college had outgrown its Silver Street campus.

In 1966, the college purchased more than 70 acres (280,000 m^{2}) of land next on the Kennebec River. The entire college was relocated to the West River Road campus.

In April 2012, the college announced the inauguration of its fifth president, Laurie G. Lachance. Lachance was the first woman and first alumna to head the college.

In November 2024, Thomas College announced that Dr. Jeannine Diddle Uzzi would become its sixth president, succeeding Laurie G. Lachance upon her retirement. Uzzi was formally inaugurated on April 11, 2025.

In October 2025, full-time faculty at Thomas College voted to unionize, affiliating with the Maine Education Association (MEA). Of 42 eligible faculty, 28 voted in favor and 7 against forming the union. The vote followed months of growing tensions between faculty and the administration over shared governance and policy changes that included reductions in online and hybrid course offerings and changes to workload expectations.

During the organizing effort, faculty members also passed a vote of no confidence in President Uzzi in July 2025, citing a breakdown in communication and shared governance. The Maine Education Association subsequently filed a complaint with the National Labor Relations Board alleging unfair labor practices, including the dismissal of a faculty member for union activity; the case remains pending.

The college released a statement respecting the faculty's right to organize and expressing willingness to work collaboratively with the new union.

== Academics ==
Thomas College consists of the School of Arts and Sciences, the H. Allen Ryan School of Business, and the Peter and Paula Lunder School of Education. Thomas College offers over 30 undergraduate majors and several Master of Business Administration and Master of Science degrees.

== Athletics ==
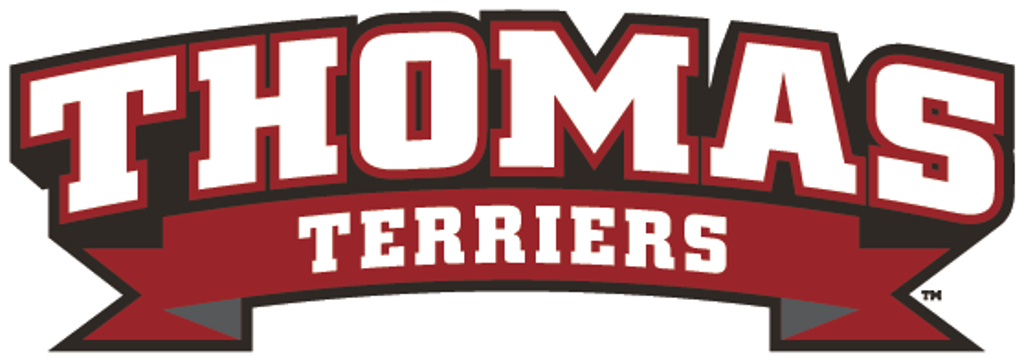
Thomas Terriers wordmark

Thomas College has 20 varsity athletic programs (whose teams are nicknamed Terriers), which about 45% of the student population participates.

Thomas has an esports program, which was expanded in 2024. Thomas plans to double the size of its esports facilities and equipment, hiring additional coaching staff, and making more room for esports athletes to join.

The college mascot is a terrier nicknamed "Tommy" who appears at sporting and other public events.

Alumni include a number of international soccer players, including Mikkail Crockwell and Tre Ming, both of whom played for the Bermuda national football team.
