= Barbara W. Woodlee =

American college administrator

Dr. Barbara W. Woodlee

President of Kennebec Valley Community College
- In office 1984 – December 2012
- Preceded by: Bernard King
- Succeeded by: Richard Hopper

Personal details
- Born: Barbara Warren; 1946 (age 79–80) Fort Worth, Texas
- Spouse: Jimmie Woodlee
- Children: 4
- Education: Associate degree, Cazenovia College (1966); B.S., psychology, University of Maine at Farmington (1974); M.A., adult education, University of Southern Maine (1982); Ed.D., higher education administration, Vanderbilt University (1992)
- Awards: Maine Women's Hall of Fame (2015)

Barbara W. Woodlee (born 1946) is an American college administrator. She was president of Kennebec Valley Community College in Fairfield, Maine, from 1984 to 2012, and since 2013 has served as chief academic officer of the Maine Community College System. She was the first woman president in both the state technical college and community college systems. She was inducted into the Maine Women's Hall of Fame in 2015.

== Early life and education ==
Barbara Warren was born in Fort Worth, Texas. In the 1950s she grew up in Southern California, where her father had an executive position with General Dynamics. After high school, she studied at Cazenovia College in Cazenovia, New York, receiving an associate degree in 1966. In the early 1970s she relocated to Maine and earned a bachelor's degree in psychology from the University of Maine at Farmington in 1974. Later, in 1982, she completed a master's degree in adult education at the University of Southern Maine, and, in 1992, an Ed.D. in higher education administration from Vanderbilt University.

== Career ==
In the early 1970s she worked for the Maine Department of Labor in Waterville tutoring adults in reading and career training. In 1976 she joined the staff at the six-year-old Kennebec Valley Vocational-Technical Institute in Waterville as director of adult education. At the time, the school enrolled 100 students. In 1983 she was named assistant director and academic dean of the college, and in 1984 succeeded Bernard King, founding director of the college, who died that year. Her starting salary as director (president) was $34,603.

Woodlee oversaw the growth of the college both in course offerings and student body, which reached 3,300 in less than 30 years. She helped introduce courses in health care and other disciplines that would lead to higher-paying jobs for graduates. She also built relationships with other colleges to facilitate student transfers between two- and four-year institutions. The college was renamed Kennebec Valley Technical College in 1989 and Kennebec Valley Community College in 2003, when it joined the Maine Community College System. Woodlee was the first woman president in both the state technical college system and community college system.

Although she planned to retire in the summer of 2010, she extended her tenure for another two years when two national searches failed to identify a suitable successor. Over the next two years, she oversaw several large projects, including a computer software conversion, building and renovation plans, and the acquisition of a 700 acres (280 ha) campus in Hinckley. She retired in December 2012 and immediately began working as chief academic officer for the Maine Community College System.

== Memberships ==
Woodlee was a director of the American Association of Community Colleges and co-chair of the steering committee of the Maine Higher Education Partnership. She was chair of the board of MaineGeneral Health in 2006–07, chairman of the board of directors for the Mid-State Economic Development Corporation, a director of the Mid-Maine Global Forum, a member of the board of directors of United Way, and a member of the Waterville School Board. She and her husband are members of the Founders Club of the Alfond Youth Center; in 2015 she served as vice president of the Founders Club. In the late 1970s she was a four-year member of the Governor's Advisory Committee for Displaced Homemakers.

== Awards and honors ==
Woodlee received a Distinguished Community Service Award from the Mid-Maine Chamber of Commerce in 1997, a Distinguished Alumni Award from the University of Maine at Farmington in 2010, and an Achievement Citation Award from the American Association of University Women in 2011. The Alfond Youth Center in Waterville named her to their Hall of Fame in 2012. She was inducted into the Maine Women's Hall of Fame in 2015.

== Personal life ==
Her first husband was David Lanman, with whom she had two children, Amy and Amanda. In 1980, she married Jimmie Woodlee, a physician assistant at Redington-Fairview Hospital. He later worked at the Colby College Health Center. They had two children, William and Rachel, and maintain homes in Virginia Beach, Virginia.
