= Maine State Bar Association =

Bar Association

- Type: Legal Society
- Headquarters: Augusta, ME
- Location: United States
- Members: 3,100 in 2013
- Website: http://www.mainebar.org/

The Maine State Bar Association (MSBA) is a voluntary bar association for the state of Maine.

The Maine State Bar Association was formally created by an act of the Maine Legislature on March 6, 1891 "for the purpose of promoting the interests of the legal profession and of instituting legal reforms." The first meeting was held in the State House on March 19, 1891. Annual dues were set at one dollar and there were 281 members that first year.

A relatively progressive bar, MSBA welcomed its first woman member, Eva Bean of Old Orchard Beach, in 1911. Previous to the formal creation of the MSBA, the Maine bar had admitted Macon Allen, the first African American admitted to the practice of law anywhere in the United States, in 1844. Other landmarks include the 1970 establishment of the Maine Bar Foundation to raise funds for legal assistance to the indigent, the 1972 establishment of the MSBA's Lawyer Referral and Information Service to help people of moderate means obtain legal services, and a successful effort starting in the 1980s to increase donated legal services provided by volunteer lawyers to low-income people,

Among MSBA's publications are the Maine Bar Journal and various newsletters by its sections.

The organization is directed by a Board of elected Governors, included 11 elected by geographical districts, one each for In-House Counsel, Public Service Sector and the Young Lawyers Section, and the organization's officers (president, president-elect, vice president, immediate past president, and treasurer.)

MSBA does not handle matters such as law licensing or complaints against lawyers; these are within the purview of two arms of the Maine Judiciary, the Board of Bar Examiners and the Board of Overseers of the Bar.
