= Mabel Sine Wadsworth =

American birth control activist and women's health educator (1910–2006)

- Wadsworth in 1990
- Born: Mabel Antoinette Sine; October 14, 1910; Rochester, New York, U.S.
- Died: January 11, 2006 (aged 95); Bangor, Maine, U.S.
- Education: University of Rochester School of Nursing diploma, 1931
- Occupation: Birth control activist
- Years active: 1946–1980s
- Spouse: Richard C. Wadsworth
- Children: 3
- Parent(s): David Albert Sine; Effie Maude Harrison Sine
- Awards: Maine Women's Hall of Fame, 1990

Mabel Antoinette Sine Wadsworth (October 14, 1910 – January 11, 2006) was an American birth control activist and women's health educator. Influenced by the work of Margaret Sanger, she organized door to door campaigns in rural Maine in the 1950s and 1960s to teach women about birth control. In the 1960s she established and directed the state's first family planning program which provided contraceptive services, and helped found the Maine Family Planning Association in 1971, serving as its first president. In 1984 she supported the establishment and naming of the Mabel Wadsworth Women's Health Center in Bangor, Maine, a private, non-profit, feminist health center. Wadsworth was in the first class of inductees to the Maine Women's Hall of Fame in March 1990.

== Early life, education, and marriage ==
Mabel Antoinette Sine was born in Rochester, New York, to David Albert Sine and his wife Effie Maude Harrison Sine. After graduating from Spencerport High School, she studied at the University of Rochester School of Nursing, receiving her diploma in 1931. That same year, she married Richard C. Wadworth, M.D. (1905–1980). They had three daughters. They resided in Framingham, Massachusetts, during her husband's tenure as a pathologist at Metropolitan State Hospital in Waltham. In 1946 they relocated to Bangor, Maine, where her husband headed the Stoddard Laboratory at Eastern Maine General Hospital and Medical Center from 1947 to 1972.

== Birth control activism ==
Until women have control of their reproductive life they are not equal.

— Mabel Sine Wadsworth

While in nursing school, Wadsworth became acquainted with the work of American birth control activist Margaret Sanger. She decided to work in the field of reproductive rights education, as she saw more and more teen girls having unwanted pregnancies. Coming to Bangor in 1946, she joined the Maternal Health League, a volunteer organization modeled on Sanger's work which stressed contraceptive education. In the 1950s and 1960s, Wadsworth organized teams of outreach workers who went door to door in rural Maine to teach women about birth control. She told the Bangor Daily News in 2005:

It wasn't about feminism back in those days. It was simply educating women that you really and truly could take a pill and not have any more babies. It took some convincing for a lot of them, but when they tried it, they found it worked quite well.

In the 1960s, Wadsworth established and directed Maine's first family planning program that provided contraception services. Rather than hire professionally trained counselors and outreach workers to staff the program, she chose women who could relate with clients because of their own personal experience. While the clinics that Wadsworth supervised were often targeted by protesters and "angry letters [were] published in the paper about them", Wadsworth remained committed to the woman's right to choose.

In 1971 she was instrumental in the founding of the Maine Family Planning Association. She served as the group's first president and was a member of its board of directors. She also lobbied for the successful passage of a state bill that gave teenagers "confidential access to contraceptives and STI testing".

In 1984 she supported the establishment and the naming of the Mabel Wadsworth Women's Health Center in Bangor, Maine in her honor. The private, non-profit, feminist health service provides birth control, abortion, and AIDS treatment in addition to general women's health care.

== Other activities ==
Wadsworth volunteered for organizations including the Eastern Maine General Hospital Auxiliary and the League of Women Voters. She participated in the establishment of the Women's Resource Center (forerunner to the Maine Displaced Homemakers Program) and the first NAACP chapter in Maine. She served on the board of directors of the Bangor Counseling Center, serving as its first president. She established the Mabel Sine Wadsworth Award at the University of Rochester School of Nursing, which benefits nursing graduates who have "excelled in the women's health care area".

== Awards and honors ==
In March 1990 Wadsworth was in the first class of inductees to the Maine Women's Hall of Fame. In April she received the Maryann Hartman Award from the University of Maine.

In 1993 she was awarded an honorary Doctor of Humane Letters from the University of Maine.
