= Maine Highlands =

Geographic region in the state of Maine

The Maine Highlands is a term used in the Maine tourism industry for a centrally located region that constitutes a large portion of the state of Maine. The Highlands are made up of Piscataquis and Penobscot counties. Formerly known as the Penquis region, the Maine Highlands name was adopted in the late 1990s to better describe the area as a tourism region.

From the late 19th century through the early 20th century the term was used to refer to the portion of the Appalachian Mountain range located within Maine. In the late 18th century and early 19th century, this was one of the areas of disputed boundary between the United States and Canada. This lack of a clear boundary in this area and further east in Maine, led to the Aroostook War, the only war ever declared by a U.S. state on a foreign country. "Maine Highlands" continued to be used to describe that portion of the border region running through the mountains at least until 1916.

The Highlands lie within the New England-Acadian forests ecoregion. Four border crossing stations serve the Canada–United States border in the region.

== See also ==
- Geology of the Appalachians
