= Woodlea Historic District =

Neighborhood in Phoenix, Arizona

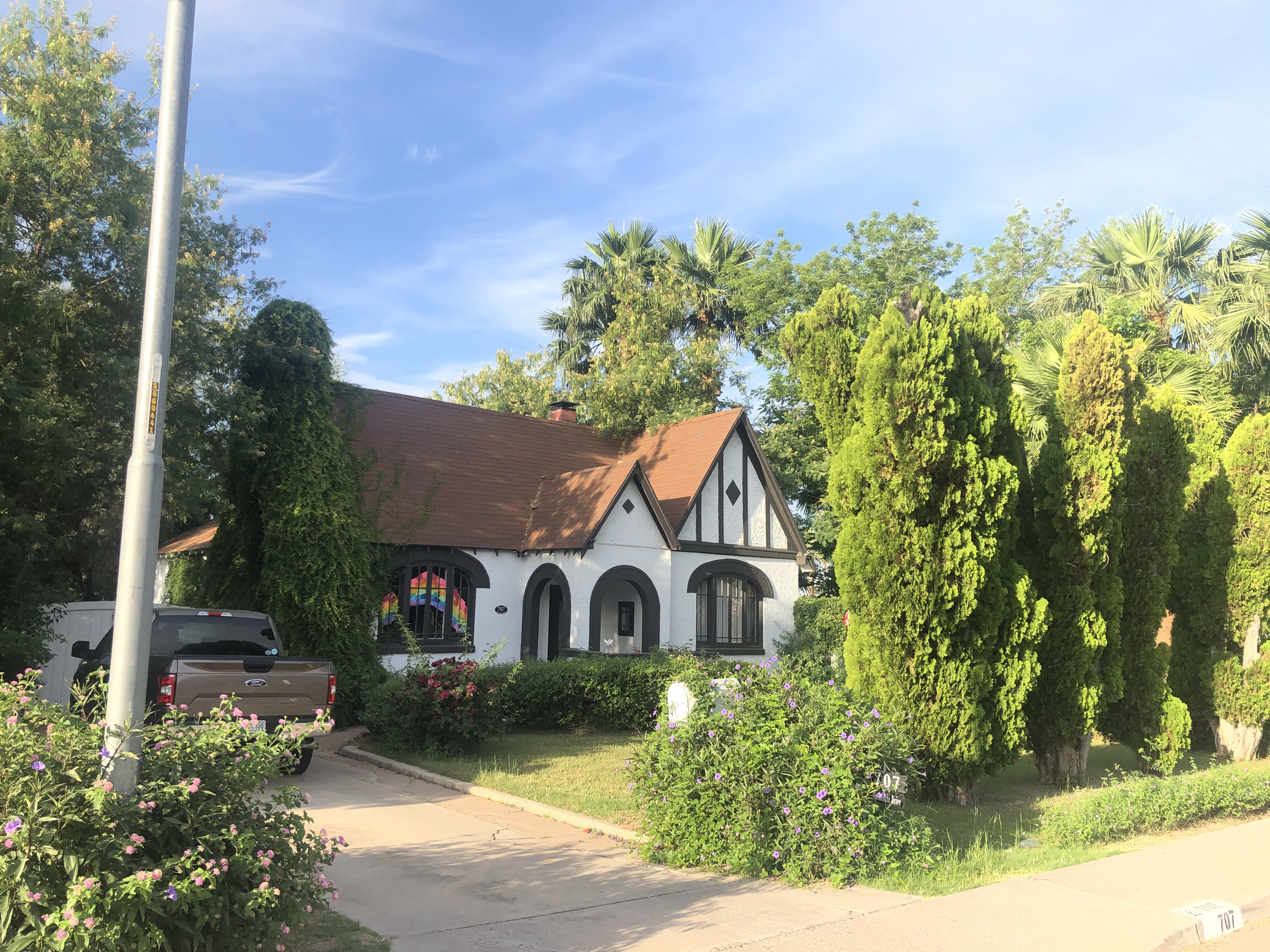
A Tudor revival home in the Woodlea historic district

The Woodlea Historic District is located in central Phoenix, Arizona, United States. The neighborhood runs from Glenrosa Ave. south to Monterosa St. and from Seventh Ave. west to Fifteenth Ave. The neighborhood as well as many of the individual houses are listed on the National Register of Historic Places. The neighborhood is known for its tree shaded sidewalks, abundant plant life and is served by an antique irrigation system from the Grand Canal.

The neighborhood consists of 166 homes that were constructed from the late 1920s through the mid 1950s. A variety of architectural styles, including Spanish Colonial Revival, Streamline Moderne, Transitional Ranch-Style, French Provincial ranch, English Tudor and Craftsman bungalow are all represented within the neighborhood.

== History ==
In 1928, Thomas Mackenzie purchased 47 acres of lettuce fields north of the city limits for $20,000, according to Phoenix historians. He named the planned subdivision "Woodlea," for the abundant trees on the acreage. Mackenzie Drive in the district is named for him. With a handful of homes constructed before the crash, building slowed down substantially with the great depression. Construction continued slowly, with only a few homes being constructed during the 1930s, and by 1936 Mackenzie was forced to foreclose on the remaining lots. Building picked up again a few years later and boomed during the 1940s. Most of the homes in the neighborhood were built during this period. Some owners hired independent builders to construct their homes, but there were also a few builders who made investments in several lots each. One of these contractors, Andy Womack, built eight houses and would go on to become a major figure in the Phoenix area, including constructing the adjacent subdivision, Melrose Manor. The neighborhood was granted Historic Preservation Overlay Zoning by the city of Phoenix in January 1999 and was accepted onto the National Register of Historic Places in November 2013.
