= Maine Women's Lobby =

- Abbreviation: MWL
- Formation: 1978
- Headquarters: Augusta, Maine
- Executive Director: Destie Hohman Sprague
- Board Chair: Elizabeth Riotte
- Website: mainewomen.org

The Maine Women's Lobby (MWL) was founded in 1978 and is dedicated to legislative action on behalf of Maine's women and girls. The Maine Women's Lobby believes women and girls should have economic security, access to health care, and freedom from violence and discrimination.

== History ==
The Maine Women's Lobby was founded in 1978 by nine women, including Patricia E. Ryan, Linda Smith Dyer, Lois Galgay Reckitt, and Janet T. Mills. During the 1978 Maine Legislative Session, the group worked to fund battered women’s shelters, but when the session concluded, there was no money appropriated for the shelters. The group was told that they had not been represented during the vote. After the defeat of the Battered Women’s Projects in 1978, they decided they would never be unrepresented during a legislative vote again.

Then-Maine Attorney General Janet T. Mills was elected to the Board of Directors of the Maine Women's Lobby in 1998. She resigned after being elected Governor of Maine in 2018. In 2010, the organization launched the "She Decides" campaign, which compiles political candidates' responses to questionnaires geared towards women's issues.

In the 2018 story, "We‘ve Come A Long Way, Baby...Haven‘t We?", published by Portland Magazine, then-Executive Director Eliza Townsend notes the expansion of Maine’s Family Medical Leave law to include domestic partners in 2007 as a recent highlight of the MWL's work. In 2015, L.D. 921 was passed to provide more extensive protections for victims and survivors of domestic violence, sexual assault, and stalking in the workplace. Penalties increased for employers who fire employees needing to take time off to attend court dates, doctor appointments, and other related burdens.

== Maine Women's Lobby Education Fund ==
The Maine Women's Lobby Education Fund, formerly known as the Maine Women's Policy Center, is the sister organization to the Maine Women's Lobby and is to help Mainers develop the knowledge, skills, and confidence to engage in feminist, anti-oppression-based public policy advocacy and civic life.

The MWL Education Fund does this through programming focused on community building and community organizing in order to increase knowledge, skills, and opportunities for citizens to engage in public policy change.

The Maine Women's Lobby Education Fund (MWLEF) was founded in 1990 to improve the economic, social, and political status of women and girls in Maine through public policy and leadership development. The 'Ed Fund' sponsors Girl's Day at the Maine State House, which hosts eighth grade girls from all over Maine. MWLEF also has a biennial Policy Roadmap and the Maine Women's Summit on Economic Security, which switches off every other year.
