= Mid-Eastern Athletic Conference softball tournament =

American college softball tournament

- Conference softball championship
- Sport: Softball
- Conference: Mid-Eastern Athletic Conference
- Number of teams: 6
- Format: Double-elimination tournament
- Current stadium: TowneBank Field
- Current location: Norfolk, Virginia
- Played: 1993–present
- Last contest: 2026
- Current champion: Howard (4)
- Most championships: Florida A&M (13)

The Mid-Eastern Athletic Conference softball tournament (also referred to as the MEAC Tournament) is the conference championship tournament in college softball for the Mid-Eastern Athletic Conference. It is a double-elimination tournament and seeding is based on regular season records. The winner receives the conference's automatic bid to the NCAA Division I softball tournament. The first year of the event was in 1993. Florida A&M has won the most championships, with 13. The conference gained an automatic bid to the NCAA Tournament beginning in 1995.

== Format ==
The top six teams from the regular season compete in the double-elimination tournament. The top two finishers earn a single bye, while the remaining four play opening round games. Winners advance to play the top two seeds while losers play elimination games.

== Champions ==
=== Year-by-year ===
Year	Champion	Location	MVP
1993	Florida A&M		Psaunita Andrews, Florida A&M
1994	Florida A&M		Psaunita Andrews, Florida A&M
1995	Florida A&M		Sherine Merchan, Florida A&M
1996	Hampton		Janell Staton, Florida A&M
1997	Florida A&M		Kim Browning, Florida A&M
1998	Florida A&M		
1999	Florida A&M		
2000	Bethune–Cookman		
2001	Bethune–Cookman		
2002	Bethune–Cookman		
2003	Bethune–Cookman		Amber Jackson, Bethune–Cookman
2004	Bethune–Cookman		Krista Schile, Bethune–Cookman
2005	Florida A&M		Danielle Brown, Florida A&M
2006	Florida A&M		Danielle Brown, Florida A&M
2007	Howard		
2008	Delaware State		Aisha Holloman, Delaware State
2009	Florida A&M		Amanda Reyes, Florida A&M
2010	Bethune–Cookman		Allison Garcia, Bethune–Cookman
2011	Bethune–Cookman		Allison Garcia, Bethune–Cookman
2012	Bethune–Cookman		Shanel Tolbert, Bethune–Cookman
2013	Hampton		Taylor McCoy, Hampton
2014	Florida A&M		Kenya Pereira, Florida A&M
2015	Florida A&M		Kenya Pereira, Florida A&M
2016	Florida A&M		Veronica Burse, Florida A&M
2017	Florida A&M		Kenya Pereira, Florida A&M
2018	Bethune–Cookman	Ormond Beach Sports Complex • Ormond Beach, Florida	Alexis Bermudez, Bethune–Cookman
2019	Bethune–Cookman	Ormond Beach Sports Complex • Ormond Beach, Florida	Sasha Killings, Bethune–Cookman
2020	Canceled due to the COVID-19 pandemic.		
2021	Morgan State	NSU Softball Field • Norfolk, Virginia	Stephanie Rundlett, Morgan State
2022	Howard	NSU Softball Field • Norfolk, Virginia	Analise De La Roca, Howard
2023	North Carolina Central	NSU Softball Field • Norfolk, Virginia	Jaden Davis, North Carolina Central
2024	Morgan State	NSU Softball Field • Norfolk, Virginia	Victoria Fletcher, Morgan State
2025	Howard	NSU Softball Field • Norfolk, Virginia	Ameenah Ballenger, Howard
2026	Howard	TowneBank Field • Norfolk, Virginia	Maryn Jordan, Howard

=== By school ===
School	Championships	Years
Florida A&M	13	1993, 1994, 1995, 1997, 1998, 1999, 2005, 2006, 2009, 2014, 2015, 2016, 2017
Bethune–Cookman	10	2000, 2001, 2002, 2003, 2004, 2010, 2011, 2012, 2018, 2019
Howard	4	2007, 2022, 2025, 2026
Hampton	2	1996, 2013
Morgan State	2	2021, 2024
Delaware State	1	2008
North Carolina Central	1	2023

Italics indicates the school currently does not sponsor softball in the MEAC.
