= List of NCAA Division I institutions =

This is a list of colleges and universities that are members of Division I, the highest level of competition sponsored by the National Collegiate Athletic Association (NCAA). Currently, there are 365 institutions classified as Division I (including those in the process of transitioning from other divisions), making it the second largest division by school count in the NCAA. An additional 217 institutions in one of the NCAA's other two divisions compete or will compete in Division I in at least one sport. All colleges and universities on this list are located in the United States; all states (except Alaska) plus the District of Columbia are represented by full members. Information in this list represents the current 2026–27 seasons.

== Full members ==
These schools are full members of Division I, meaning they either have finished the process of joining Division I or were members of its predecessor, the University Division.

Returning	Departing	Joining

School	Common name	Nickname	City	State	Type	Subdivision	Primary
Abilene Christian University	Abilene Christian	Wildcats	Abilene	TX	Private	FCS	United Athletic Conference (Note: From the 2023 to 2026 seasons, most football-sponsoring members of the Atlantic Sun Conference and then-Western Athletic Conference played that sport in the United Athletic Conference (UAC), a football-only merger of the two all-sports conferences. The UAC became an all-sport conference in 2026 after rebranding from the WAC. Exceptions: Bellarmine plays sprint football, a non-NCAA variant with severe limits on player weight.; Stetson plays in the Pioneer Football League.)
Alabama A&M University	Alabama A&M	Bulldogs^{[h]}	Normal (Note: Alabama A&M has a mailing address for Normal, but is located entirely within the city limits of Huntsville)	AL	Public	FCS	Southwestern Athletic Conference
Alabama State University	Alabama State	Hornets^{[i]}	Montgomery	AL	Public	FCS	Southwestern Athletic Conference
Alcorn State University	Alcorn State	Braves^{[j]}	Lorman (Note: Alcorn State has a Lorman mailing address, but is in an unincorporated area of Claiborne County that is designated by the U.S. Census Bureau as Alcorn State, Mississippi.)	MS	Public	FCS	Southwestern Athletic Conference
American University	American	Eagles	Washington	DC	Private	Non-football	Patriot League
Appalachian State University	Appalachian State	Mountaineers	Boone	NC	Public	FBS	Sun Belt Conference
Arizona State University	Arizona State	Sun Devils	Tempe (Note: Arizona State has four physical campuses in the Phoenix area. The overall and athletic administration, as well as the vast majority of the on-campus enrollment, are at the Tempe campus.)	AZ	Public	FBS	Big 12 Conference
Arkansas State University	Arkansas State	Red Wolves	Jonesboro	AR	Public	FBS	Sun Belt Conference
Auburn University	Auburn	Tigers	Auburn	AL	Public	FBS	Southeastern Conference
Austin Peay State University	Austin Peay	Governors	Clarksville	TN	Public	FCS	United Athletic Conference
Ball State University	Ball State	Cardinals	Muncie	IN	Public	FBS	Mid-American Conference
Baylor University	Baylor	Bears	Waco	TX	Private	FBS	Big 12 Conference
Bellarmine University	Bellarmine	Knights	Louisville	KY	Private	Non-football (Note: While Bellarmine remains non-football by NCAA criteria, it began playing sprint football, a weight-restricted form of American football governed outside the NCAA, in 2022.)	Atlantic Sun Conference
Belmont University	Belmont	Bruins	Nashville	TN	Private	Non-football	Missouri Valley Conference
Bethune–Cookman University	Bethune–Cookman	Wildcats	Daytona Beach	FL	Private	FCS	Southwestern Athletic Conference
Binghamton University	Binghamton	Bearcats	Binghamton (Note: The Binghamton campus has a Binghamton mailing address, but mostly lies in the adjacent town of Vestal.)	NY	Public	Non-football	America East Conference
Boise State University	Boise State	Broncos	Boise	ID	Public	FBS	Pac-12 Conference
Boston College	Boston College	Eagles	Chestnut Hill (Note: Chestnut Hill, home to the main Boston College campus, exists as a village and postal entity, but is not a municipal entity. The main campus straddles the boundary between the cities of Boston and Newton. Athletic facilities are scattered among the main campus, another campus fully within Boston, and a third fully within Newton.)	MA	Private	FBS	Atlantic Coast Conference
Boston University	Boston University	Terriers	Boston	MA	Private	Non-football	Patriot League
Bowling Green State University	Bowling Green	Falcons	Bowling Green	OH	Public	FBS	Mid-American Conference
Bradley University	Bradley	Braves	Peoria	IL	Private	Non-football	Missouri Valley Conference
Brigham Young University	BYU	Cougars	Provo	UT	Private	FBS	Big 12 Conference
Brown University	Brown	Bears	Providence	RI	Private	FCS	Ivy League
Bryant University	Bryant	Bulldogs	Smithfield	RI	Private	FCS	America East Conference (Note: The America East Conference does not sponsor football. Since the 2024 season, its four football-sponsoring schools (Albany, Bryant, Maine, and New Hampshire) have all played that sport in CAA Football, the legally separate football league administered by the all-sports Coastal Athletic Association.)
Bucknell University	Bucknell	Bison	Lewisburg	PA	Private	FCS	Patriot League
Butler University	Butler	Bulldogs	Indianapolis	IN	Private	FCS	Big East Conference (Note: The Big East Conference does not sponsor football. As of the upcoming 2026 football season, its football-sponsoring schools are aligned as follows: Butler plays in the Pioneer Football League.; Georgetown and Villanova play in the Patriot League.; UConn plays as an FBS independent.)
California Baptist University	Cal Baptist	Lancers	Riverside	CA	Private	Non-football	Big West Conference
California Polytechnic State University, San Luis Obispo	Cal Poly	Mustangs	San Luis Obispo	CA	Public	FCS	Big West Conference (Note: The Big West Conference does not sponsor football. Its football-playing members are aligned as follows: Cal Poly plays in the Big Sky Conference.; Sacramento State plays in the Mid-American Conference.)
California State University, Bakersfield	Bakersfield (Note: The university began the process of rebranding its athletic program as "Bakersfield" in the 2023–24 school year. Most national media outlets use "Cal State Bakersfield", and the NCAA uses "CSU Bakersfield".)	Roadrunners	Bakersfield	CA	Public	Non-football	Big West Conference
California State University, Fresno	Fresno State	Bulldogs	Fresno	CA	Public	FBS	Pac-12 Conference
California State University, Fullerton	Cal State Fullerton	Titans	Fullerton	CA	Public	Non-football	Big West Conference
California State University, Long Beach	Long Beach State	Beach (Note: Although all other athletic teams use the name "Beach", Long Beach baseball goes by the name "Dirtbags".)	Long Beach	CA	Public	Non-football	Big West Conference
California State University, Northridge	Cal State Northridge / CSUN	Matadors	Northridge	CA	Public	Non-football	Big West Conference
California State University, Sacramento	Sacramento State	Hornets	Sacramento	CA	Public	FBS (Note: North Dakota State and Sacramento State started transitions to FBS in July 2026, respectively as football-only members of the Mountain West Conference and Mid-American Conference.)	Big West Conference
Campbell University	Campbell	Fighting Camels	Buies Creek	NC	Private	FCS	Coastal Athletic Association (Note: The Coastal Athletic Association's football league, branded as CAA Football, is a legally separate entity from the all-sports CAA, though both share the same administration.)
Canisius University	Canisius	Golden Griffins	Buffalo	NY	Private	Non-football	Metro Conference
Central Connecticut State University	Central Connecticut	Blue Devils	New Britain	CT	Public	FCS	NEC
Central Michigan University	Central Michigan	Chippewas	Mount Pleasant	MI	Public	FBS	Mid-American Conference
Charleston Southern University	Charleston Southern	Buccaneers	North Charleston	SC	Private	FCS	Big South Conference (Note: The Big South Conference does not sponsor football. Its football-playing members are aligned as follows: Charleston Southern and Gardner–Webb play in the Ohio Valley Conference.; Presbyterian plays in the Pioneer Football League.)
Chicago State University	Chicago State	Cougars	Chicago	IL	Public	FCS (Note: Chicago State started an FCS football program in 2026, playing that season as an independent before joining NEC football in 2027.)	NEC
Clemson University	Clemson	Tigers	Clemson	SC	Public	FBS	Atlantic Coast Conference
Cleveland State University	Cleveland State	Vikings	Cleveland	OH	Public	Non-football	Horizon League
Coastal Carolina University	Coastal Carolina	Chanticleers	Conway	SC	Public	FBS	Sun Belt Conference
Colgate University	Colgate	Raiders	Hamilton	NY	Private	FCS	Patriot League
College of Charleston	Charleston (Note: While "Charleston" is the preferred description for the athletic program, it can also be referred to by the full school name or "Charleston (SC)" due to the existence of the University of Charleston, a Division II institution in West Virginia's state capital. However, the West Virginia school plays only one sport in Division I—men's volleyball, a sport not sponsored by the South Carolina school.)	Cougars	Charleston	SC	Public	Non-football	Coastal Athletic Association
College of William & Mary	William & Mary	Tribe	Williamsburg	VA	Public	FCS	Coastal Athletic Association (Note: William & Mary football plays in the Patriot League while remaining a member of the all-sports CAA.)
College of the Holy Cross	Holy Cross	Crusaders	Worcester	MA	Private	FCS	Patriot League
Colorado State University	Colorado State	Rams	Fort Collins	CO	Public	FBS	Pac-12 Conference
Columbia University (Note: Columbia operates their athletic department as a consortium with Barnard College, where students at Barnard may compete on Columbia's athletic teams.)	Columbia	Lions	New York	NY	Private	FCS	Ivy League
Coppin State University	Coppin State	Eagles	Baltimore	MD	Public	Non-football	Mid-Eastern Athletic Conference
Cornell University	Cornell	Big Red	Ithaca	NY	Private	FCS	Ivy League
Creighton University	Creighton	Bluejays	Omaha	NE	Private	Non-football	Big East Conference
Dartmouth College	Dartmouth	Big Green	Hanover	NH	Private	FCS	Ivy League
Davidson College	Davidson	Wildcats	Davidson	NC	Private	FCS	Atlantic 10 Conference (Note: The Atlantic 10 Conference does not sponsor football. Its football-playing members are aligned as follows: Davidson and Dayton play in the Pioneer Football League.; Duquesne plays in the NEC.; Fordham and Richmond play in the Patriot League.; Rhode Island plays in CAA Football.)
Delaware State University	Delaware State	Hornets^{[i]}	Dover	DE	Public (Note: Both Delaware and Delaware State are legally chartered as "privately governed, state-assisted" institutions. This status is similar to that of New York State's statutory colleges, most of which are housed at Cornell University, or institutions in Pennsylvania's Commonwealth System of Higher Education.)	FCS	Mid-Eastern Athletic Conference
DePaul University	DePaul	Blue Demons	Chicago	IL	Private	Non-football	Big East Conference
Drake University	Drake	Bulldogs	Des Moines	IA	Private	FCS	Missouri Valley Conference (Note: The Missouri Valley Conference does not sponsor football. Its football-playing schools are aligned as follows: Drake and Valparaiso play in the Pioneer Football League.; Illinois State, Indiana State, Murray State, Northern Iowa, and Southern Illinois play in the Missouri Valley Football Conference, a legally separate entity from the MVC.)
Drexel University	Drexel	Dragons	Philadelphia	PA	Private	Non-football	Coastal Athletic Association
Duke University	Duke	Blue Devils	Durham	NC	Private	FBS	Atlantic Coast Conference
Duquesne University	Duquesne	Dukes	Pittsburgh	PA	Private	FCS	Atlantic 10 Conference
East Carolina University	East Carolina	Pirates^{[q]}	Greenville	NC	Public	FBS	American Conference
Eastern Illinois University	Eastern Illinois	Panthers	Charleston	IL	Public	FCS	Ohio Valley Conference
Eastern Kentucky University	Eastern Kentucky	Colonels	Richmond	KY	Public	FCS	United Athletic Conference
Eastern Michigan University	Eastern Michigan	Eagles	Ypsilanti	MI	Public	FBS	Mid-American Conference
Eastern Washington University	Eastern Washington	Eagles	Cheney	WA	Public	FCS	Big Sky Conference
East Tennessee State University	East Tennessee State	Buccaneers	Johnson City	TN	Public	FCS	Southern Conference
East Texas A&M University	East Texas A&M	Lions	Commerce	TX	Public	FCS	Southland Conference
Elon University	Elon	Phoenix	Elon	NC	Private	FCS	Coastal Athletic Association
Fairfield University	Fairfield	Stags	Fairfield	CT	Private	Non-football	Metro Conference (Note: Fairfield will join the Coastal Athletic Association in 2027.)
Fairleigh Dickinson University, Metropolitan Campus	Fairleigh Dickinson	Knights	Hackensack	NJ	Private	Non-football	NEC
Florida A&M University	Florida A&M	Rattlers^{[s]}	Tallahassee	FL	Public	FCS	Southwestern Athletic Conference
Florida Atlantic University	Florida Atlantic	Owls	Boca Raton	FL	Public	FBS	American Conference
Florida Gulf Coast University	FGCU (Note: National media outlets generally use "Florida Gulf Coast", but the school, NCAA, and ASUN all use "FGCU".)	Eagles	Fort Myers (Note: The FGCU campus has a Fort Myers mailing address, but is in unincorporated Lee County.)	FL	Public	Non-football	Atlantic Sun Conference
Florida International University	FIU	Panthers	Miami (Note: The FIU campus has a Miami mailing address, but is in the unincorporated Miami-Dade County community of Westchester.)	FL	Public	FBS	Conference USA
Florida State University	Florida State	Seminoles	Tallahassee	FL	Public	FBS	Atlantic Coast Conference
Fordham University	Fordham	Rams	Bronx	NY	Private	FCS	Atlantic 10 Conference
Furman University	Furman	Paladins^{[t]}	Greenville	SC	Private	FCS	Southern Conference
Gardner–Webb University	Gardner–Webb	Runnin' Bulldogs	Boiling Springs	NC	Private	FCS	Big South Conference
George Mason University	George Mason	Patriots	Fairfax (Note: The main George Mason campus has a Fairfax mailing address, but the U.S. Census Bureau treats it as George Mason, Virginia, a census-designated place in unincorporated Fairfax County.)	VA	Public	Non-football	Atlantic 10 Conference
George Washington University	George Washington	Revolutionaries	Washington	DC	Private	Non-football	Atlantic 10 Conference
Georgetown University	Georgetown	Hoyas	Washington	DC	Private	FCS	Big East Conference
Georgia Institute of Technology	Georgia Tech	Yellow Jackets	Atlanta	GA	Public	FBS	Atlantic Coast Conference
Georgia Southern University	Georgia Southern	Eagles^{[u]}	Statesboro	GA	Public	FBS	Sun Belt Conference
Georgia State University	Georgia State	Panthers	Atlanta	GA	Public	FBS	Sun Belt Conference
Gonzaga University	Gonzaga	Bulldogs (Note: While "Bulldogs" is the official nickname, the school widely uses "Zags" as an alternate nickname.)	Spokane	WA	Private	Non-football	Pac-12 Conference
Grambling State University	Grambling State	Tigers^{[v]}	Grambling	LA	Public	FCS	Southwestern Athletic Conference
Grand Canyon University	Grand Canyon	Antelopes	Phoenix	AZ	Private	Non-football	Mountain West Conference
Hampton University	Hampton	Pirates^{[q]}	Hampton	VA	Private	FCS	Coastal Athletic Association
Harvard University	Harvard	Crimson	Cambridge (Note: While Harvard's overall administration and undergraduate campus are in Cambridge, the athletic department offices and most athletic venues are within the Boston city limits and have a Boston mailing address.)	MA	Private	FCS	Ivy League
High Point University	High Point	Panthers	High Point	NC	Private	Non-football	Big South Conference
Hofstra University	Hofstra	Pride	Hempstead	NY	Private	Non-football	Coastal Athletic Association
Houston Christian University	Houston Christian	Huskies	Houston	TX	Private	FCS	Southland Conference
Howard University	Howard	Bison^{[x]}	Washington	DC	Private	FCS	Mid-Eastern Athletic Conference
Idaho State University	Idaho State	Bengals	Pocatello	ID	Public	FCS	Big Sky Conference
Illinois State University	Illinois State	Redbirds	Normal	IL	Public	FCS	Missouri Valley Conference
Indiana State University	Indiana State	Sycamores	Terre Haute	IN	Public	FCS	Missouri Valley Conference
Indiana University Bloomington	Indiana	Hoosiers	Bloomington	IN	Public	FBS	Big Ten Conference
Indiana University Indianapolis	IU Indy	Jaguars	Indianapolis	IN	Public	Non-football	Horizon League
Iona University	Iona	Gaels	New Rochelle	NY	Private	Non-football	Metro Conference
Iowa State University	Iowa State	Cyclones	Ames	IA	Public	FBS	Big 12 Conference
Jackson State University	Jackson State	Tigers^{[v]}	Jackson	MS	Public	FCS	Southwestern Athletic Conference
Jacksonville State University	Jax State	Gamecocks	Jacksonville	AL	Public	FBS	Conference USA
Jacksonville University	Jacksonville	Dolphins	Jacksonville	FL	Private	Non-football	Atlantic Sun Conference
James Madison University	James Madison	Dukes	Harrisonburg	VA	Public	FBS	Sun Belt Conference (Note: James Madison will join the American Conference in 2027.)
Kansas State University	Kansas State	Wildcats	Manhattan	KS	Public	FBS	Big 12 Conference
Kennesaw State University	Kennesaw State	Owls	Kennesaw (Note: The KSU campus has a Kennesaw mailing address, but is in unincorporated Cobb County.)	GA	Public	FBS	Conference USA
Kent State University	Kent State	Golden Flashes	Kent	OH	Public	FBS	Mid-American Conference
Lafayette College	Lafayette	Leopards	Easton	PA	Private	FCS	Patriot League
Lamar University	Lamar	Cardinals^{[ab]}	Beaumont	TX	Public	FCS	Southland Conference
La Salle University	La Salle	Explorers	Philadelphia	PA	Private	Non-football	Atlantic 10 Conference
Lehigh University	Lehigh	Mountain Hawks	Bethlehem	PA	Private	FCS	Patriot League
Le Moyne College	Le Moyne	Dolphins	Syracuse (Note: Le Moyne's campus has a Syracuse mailing address, but is almost entirely located in the adjacent town of DeWitt.)	NY	Private	Non-football	NEC (Note: Le Moyne and Stonehill will both join the Metro Conference in 2027.)
Liberty University	Liberty	Flames^{[ac]}	Lynchburg	VA	Private	FBS	Conference USA
Lindenwood University	Lindenwood	Lions and Lady Lions	Saint Charles	MO	Private	FCS	Ohio Valley Conference
Lipscomb University	Lipscomb	Bisons^{[ad]}	Nashville	TN	Private	Non-football	Atlantic Sun Conference
Long Island University	LIU	Sharks	Brooklyn & Brookville (Note: Long Island University has two main campuses, both of which had separate athletic programs before 2019–20—LIU Brooklyn in the New York City borough of that name, and LIU Post in Brookville. The overall athletic administration is at Post, but multiple teams operate from each campus. All of LIU's current NCAA teams are open to undergraduates at both campuses who meet NCAA eligibility requirements.)	NY	Private	FCS	NEC
Longwood University	Longwood	Lancers	Farmville	VA	Public	Non-football	Big South Conference
Louisiana State University	LSU	Tigers^{[v]}	Baton Rouge	LA	Public	FBS	Southeastern Conference
Louisiana State University New Orleans	LSU New Orleans	Privateers	New Orleans	LA	Public	Non-football	Southland Conference
Louisiana Tech University	Louisiana Tech	Bulldogs^{[ae]}	Ruston	LA	Public	FBS	Sun Belt Conference
Loyola Marymount University	Loyola Marymount	Lions	Los Angeles	CA	Private	Non-football	West Coast Conference
Loyola University Chicago	Loyola Chicago	Ramblers	Chicago	IL	Private	Non-football	Atlantic 10 Conference
Loyola University Maryland	Loyola	Greyhounds	Baltimore	MD	Private	Non-football	Patriot League
Manhattan University	Manhattan	Jaspers^{[af]}	Riverdale	NY	Private	Non-football	Metro Conference
Marist University	Marist	Red Foxes	Poughkeepsie	NY	Private	FCS	Metro Conference (Note: The Metro Conference does not sponsor football. Its football-sponsoring schools are aligned as follows: Marist plays in the Pioneer Football League.; Merrimack plays as an FCS independent.; Sacred Heart plays in CAA Football.)
Marquette University	Marquette	Golden Eagles	Milwaukee	WI	Private	Non-football	Big East Conference
Marshall University	Marshall	Thundering Herd	Huntington	WV	Public	FBS	Sun Belt Conference
McNeese State University	McNeese	Cowboys^{[ah]}	Lake Charles	LA	Public	FCS	Southland Conference
Mercer University	Mercer	Bears	Macon	GA	Private	FCS	Southern Conference
Merrimack College	Merrimack	Warriors	North Andover	MA	Private	FCS	Metro Conference
Miami University	Miami (Ohio)	RedHawks	Oxford	OH	Public	FBS	Mid-American Conference
Michigan State University	Michigan State	Spartans	East Lansing	MI	Public	FBS	Big Ten Conference
Middle Tennessee State University	Middle Tennessee	Blue Raiders	Murfreesboro	TN	Public	FBS	Conference USA
Mississippi State University	Mississippi State	Bulldogs	Mississippi State	MS	Public	FBS	Southeastern Conference
Mississippi Valley State University	Mississippi Valley State	Delta Devils^{[ai]}	Itta Bena (Note: The MVSU campus has an Itta Bena mailing address, but lies in unincorporated Leflore County and is designated by the U.S. Census Bureau as Mississippi Valley State, Mississippi.)	MS	Public	FCS	Southwestern Athletic Conference
Missouri State University	Missouri State	Bears^{[aj]}	Springfield	MO	Public	FBS	Conference USA
Monmouth University	Monmouth	Hawks	West Long Branch	NJ	Private	FCS	Coastal Athletic Association
Montana State University	Montana State	Bobcats	Bozeman	MT	Public	FCS	Big Sky Conference
Morehead State University	Morehead State	Eagles	Morehead	KY	Public	FCS	Ohio Valley Conference (Note: Morehead State plays football in the Pioneer Football League.)
Morgan State University	Morgan State	Bears^{[aj]}	Baltimore	MD	Public	FCS	Mid-Eastern Athletic Conference
Mount St. Mary's University	Mount St. Mary's	Mountaineers	Emmitsburg (Note: The Mount St. Mary's campus has an Emmitsburg mailing address, but lies in unincorporated Frederick County.)	MD	Private	Non-football	Metro Conference
Murray State University	Murray State	Racers	Murray	KY	Public	FCS	Missouri Valley Conference
New Jersey Institute of Technology	NJIT	Highlanders	Newark	NJ	Public	Non-football	America East Conference
New Mexico State University	New Mexico State	Aggies	Las Cruces	NM	Public	FBS	Conference USA
Niagara University	Niagara	Purple Eagles	Niagara University (Note: The Niagara campus is its own census-designated place and postal entity within the town of Lewiston.)	NY	Private	Non-football	Metro Conference
Nicholls State University	Nicholls	Colonels	Thibodaux	LA	Public	FCS	Southland Conference
Norfolk State University	Norfolk State	Spartans	Norfolk	VA	Public	FCS	Mid-Eastern Athletic Conference
North Carolina A&T State University	North Carolina A&T	Aggies	Greensboro	NC	Public	FCS	Coastal Athletic Association
North Carolina Central University	North Carolina Central	Eagles	Durham	NC	Public	FCS	Mid-Eastern Athletic Conference
North Carolina State University	NC State	Wolfpack	Raleigh	NC	Public	FBS	Atlantic Coast Conference
North Dakota State University	North Dakota State	Bison	Fargo	ND	Public	FBS	Summit League (Note: The Summit League does not sponsor football. As of the 2026 season, its football-playing members are aligned as follows: North Dakota, South Dakota, and South Dakota State play in the Missouri Valley Football Conference.; North Dakota State plays FBS football in the Mountain West Conference.; St. Thomas plays in the Pioneer Football League.)
Northeastern University	Northeastern	Huskies	Boston	MA	Private	Non-football	Coastal Athletic Association
Northern Arizona University	Northern Arizona	Lumberjacks	Flagstaff	AZ	Public	FCS	Big Sky Conference
Northern Illinois University	Northern Illinois	Huskies	DeKalb	IL	Public	FBS	Horizon League (Note: The Horizon League does not sponsor football. Its football-playing members are aligned as follows: Northern Illinois plays FBS football in the Mountain West Conference.; Robert Morris plays in the NEC.; Youngstown State plays in the Missouri Valley Football Conference.)
Northern Kentucky University	Northern Kentucky	Norse	Highland Heights	KY	Public	Non-football	Horizon League
Northwestern State University	Northwestern State	Demons^{[al]}	Natchitoches	LA	Public	FCS	Southland Conference
Northwestern University	Northwestern	Wildcats	Evanston	IL	Private	FBS	Big Ten Conference
Oakland University	Oakland	Golden Grizzlies	Rochester (Note: The main Oakland campus has a Rochester mailing address, but lies entirely within the separate cities of Auburn Hills and Rochester Hills.)	MI	Public	Non-football	Horizon League
Ohio University	Ohio	Bobcats	Athens	OH	Public	FBS	Mid-American Conference
Ohio State University	Ohio State	Buckeyes	Columbus	OH	Public	FBS	Big Ten Conference
Oklahoma State University	Oklahoma State	Cowboys^{[ah]}	Stillwater	OK	Public	FBS	Big 12 Conference
Old Dominion University	Old Dominion	Monarchs	Norfolk	VA	Public	FBS	Sun Belt Conference
Oral Roberts University	Oral Roberts	Golden Eagles	Tulsa	OK	Private	Non-football	Summit League
Oregon State University	Oregon State	Beavers	Corvallis	OR	Public	FBS	Pac-12 Conference
Pennsylvania State University	Penn State	Nittany Lions^{[ap]}	University Park (Note: The entire Penn State campus is designated by the U.S. Postal Service as "University Park, Pennsylvania". It spreads across three communities: State College, which hosts the core of the academic campus; College Township, where most athletic facilities are located; and Ferguson Township, which houses most of the university's agricultural operations.)	PA	Public (Note: As members of the Commonwealth System of Higher Education, Penn State, Pitt, and Temple are privately governed, but receive financial support from the Pennsylvania state government.)	FBS	Big Ten Conference
Pepperdine University	Pepperdine	Waves	Malibu (Note: The Pepperdine campus has a Malibu mailing address, but is in unincorporated Los Angeles County.)	CA	Private	Non-football	West Coast Conference
Portland State University	Portland State	Vikings	Portland	OR	Public	FCS	Big Sky Conference
Prairie View A&M University	Prairie View A&M	Panthers^{[an]}	Prairie View	TX	Public	FCS	Southwestern Athletic Conference
Presbyterian College	Presbyterian	Blue Hose	Clinton	SC	Private	FCS	Big South Conference
Princeton University	Princeton	Tigers	Princeton	NJ	Private	FCS	Ivy League
Providence College	Providence	Friars	Providence	RI	Private	Non-football	Big East Conference
Purdue University	Purdue	Boilermakers	West Lafayette	IN	Public	FBS	Big Ten Conference
Purdue University Fort Wayne	Purdue Fort Wayne	Mastodons	Fort Wayne	IN	Public	Non-football	Horizon League
Queens University of Charlotte	Queens (NC)	Royals	Charlotte	NC	Private	Non-football	Atlantic Sun Conference
Quinnipiac University	Quinnipiac	Bobcats	Hamden	CT	Private	Non-football	Metro Conference
Radford University	Radford	Highlanders	Radford	VA	Public	Non-football	Big South Conference
Rice University	Rice	Owls	Houston	TX	Private	FBS	American Conference
Rider University	Rider	Broncs	Lawrenceville	NJ	Private	Non-football	Metro Conference
Robert Morris University	Robert Morris	Colonials	Moon	PA	Private	FCS	Horizon League
Rutgers University–New Brunswick	Rutgers	Scarlet Knights	New Brunswick (Note: The Rutgers campus is mostly split between New Brunswick, East Brunswick, and Piscataway, with small portions in several adjoining communities. The university administration is in New Brunswick; the athletic program offices and all athletic facilities are in Piscataway and have a Piscataway mailing address.)	NJ	Public	FBS	Big Ten Conference
Sacred Heart University	Sacred Heart	Pioneers	Fairfield	CT	Private	FCS	Metro Conference
Saint Bonaventure University	St. Bonaventure	Bonnies	Saint Bonaventure	NY	Private	Non-football	Atlantic 10 Conference
Saint John's University	St. John's	Red Storm	Queens	NY	Private	Non-football	Big East Conference
Saint Joseph's University	Saint Joseph's	Hawks	Philadelphia (Note: Saint Joseph's campus is split by the boundary between Philadelphia and Lower Merion Township. The entire campus has a Philadelphia mailing address.)	PA	Private	Non-football	Atlantic 10 Conference
Saint Louis University	Saint Louis	Billikens	Saint Louis	MO	Private	Non-football	Atlantic 10 Conference
Saint Mary's College of California	Saint Mary's	Gaels	Moraga	CA	Private	Non-football	West Coast Conference
Saint Peter's University	Saint Peter's	Peacocks	Jersey City	NJ	Private	Non-football	Metro Conference
Sam Houston State University	Sam Houston	Bearkats	Huntsville	TX	Public	FBS	Conference USA
Samford University	Samford	Bulldogs	Homewood	AL	Private	FCS	Southern Conference
San Diego State University	San Diego State	Aztecs	San Diego	CA	Public	FBS	Pac-12 Conference
San Jose State University	San Jose State	Spartans	San Jose	CA	Public	FBS	Mountain West Conference
Santa Clara University	Santa Clara	Broncos	Santa Clara	CA	Private	Non-football	West Coast Conference
Seattle University	Seattle (Note: The university, West Coast Conference, and NCAA all use "Seattle U". National media typically omit the "U".)	Redhawks	Seattle	WA	Private	Non-football	West Coast Conference
Seton Hall University	Seton Hall	Pirates	South Orange	NJ	Private	Non-football	Big East Conference
Siena University	Siena	Saints	Loudonville	NY	Private	Non-football	Metro Conference
South Carolina State University	South Carolina State	Bulldogs^{[h]}	Orangeburg	SC	Public	FCS	Mid-Eastern Athletic Conference
South Dakota State University	South Dakota State	Jackrabbits	Brookings	SD	Public	FCS	Summit League
Southeast Missouri State University	SEMO (Note: While this is the school's preferred athletic identity, the OVC uses "Southeast Missouri", and the NCAA and national media use "Southeast Missouri State".)	Redhawks	Cape Girardeau	MO	Public	FCS	Ohio Valley Conference
Southeastern Louisiana University	Southeastern Louisiana	Lions^{[ap]}	Hammond	LA	Public	FCS	Southland Conference
Southern University, Baton Rouge	Southern	Jaguars^{[aq]}	Baton Rouge	LA	Public	FCS	Southwestern Athletic Conference
Southern Illinois University Carbondale	Southern Illinois	Salukis	Carbondale	IL	Public	FCS	Missouri Valley Conference
Southern Illinois University Edwardsville	SIUE (Note: While national sports media generally use "SIU Edwardsville", the school, the Ohio Valley Conference, and the NCAA all use "SIUE".)	Cougars	Edwardsville	IL	Public	Non-football	Ohio Valley Conference
Southern Methodist University	SMU	Mustangs	Dallas (Note: The SMU campus has a Dallas mailing address, but almost entirely lies within University Park, a separate city within the Dallas city limits.)	TX	Private	FBS	Atlantic Coast Conference
Southern Utah University	Southern Utah	Thunderbirds	Cedar City	UT	Public	FCS	Big Sky Conference
Stanford University	Stanford	Cardinal	Stanford	CA	Private	FBS	Atlantic Coast Conference
Stephen F. Austin State University	Stephen F. Austin	Lumberjacks^{[ar]}	Nacogdoches	TX	Public	FCS	Southland Conference
Stetson University	Stetson	Hatters	DeLand	FL	Private	FCS	Atlantic Sun Conference
Stonehill College	Stonehill	Skyhawks	Easton	MA	Private	FCS	NEC
Stony Brook University	Stony Brook	Seawolves	Stony Brook	NY	Public	FCS	Coastal Athletic Association
Syracuse University	Syracuse	Orange	Syracuse	NY	Private	FBS	Atlantic Coast Conference
Tarleton State University	Tarleton State (Note: The school uses "Tarleton" and "Tarleton State" interchangeably for sports purposes.)	Texans	Stephenville	TX	Public	FCS	United Athletic Conference
Temple University	Temple	Owls	Philadelphia	PA	Public	FBS	American Conference
Tennessee State University	Tennessee State	Tigers^{[v]}	Nashville	TN	Public	FCS	Ohio Valley Conference
Tennessee Technological University (Note: While this is the legal name, the school markets itself as "Tennessee Tech University" and "Tennessee Tech". For example, the copyright notice on its official website uses "Tech" instead of "Technological", and most references to the institution on that website use "Tennessee Tech".)	Tennessee Tech	Golden Eagles	Cookeville	TN	Public	FCS	Southern Conference
Texas A&M University	Texas A&M	Aggies	College Station	TX	Public	FBS	Southeastern Conference
Texas A&M University–Corpus Christi	Texas A&M–Corpus Christi	Islanders	Corpus Christi	TX	Public	Non-football	Southland Conference
Texas Christian University	TCU	Horned Frogs	Fort Worth	TX	Private	FBS	Big 12 Conference
Texas Southern University	Texas Southern	Tigers^{[v]}	Houston	TX	Public	FCS	Southwestern Athletic Conference
Texas State University	Texas State	Bobcats	San Marcos	TX	Public	FBS	Pac-12 Conference
Texas Tech University	Texas Tech	Red Raiders^{[at]}	Lubbock	TX	Public	FBS	Big 12 Conference
The Citadel^{[be]}	The Citadel	Bulldogs	Charleston	SC	Public	FCS	Southern Conference
Towson University	Towson	Tigers	Towson	MD	Public	FCS	Coastal Athletic Association
Troy University	Troy	Trojans	Troy	AL	Public	FBS	Sun Belt Conference
Tulane University	Tulane	Green Wave	New Orleans	LA	Private	FBS	American Conference
United States Air Force Academy	Air Force	Falcons	USAF Academy (Note: Virtually all of the Air Force Academy, including the cadet area and all athletic venues, is outside the city limits of Colorado Springs. The U.S. Census Bureau and U.S. Postal Service respectively designate the Academy as "Air Force Academy" and "USAF Academy".)	CO	Federal	FBS	Mountain West Conference
United States Military Academy	Army / Army West Point (Note: The Academy, Patriot League, and NCAA use "Army West Point"; national media use "Army".)	Black Knights	West Point	NY	Federal	FBS	Patriot League (Note: Army and Navy football currently play in the American Conference.)
United States Naval Academy	Navy	Midshipmen	Annapolis	MD	Federal	FBS	Patriot League
University at Albany	Albany (Note: Alternately "UAlbany".)	Great Danes	Albany	NY	Public	FCS	America East Conference
University at Buffalo	Buffalo	Bulls	Buffalo (Note: The UB campus has a Buffalo mailing address, but mostly lies in the adjacent town of Amherst.)	NY	Public	FBS	Mid-American Conference
University of Akron	Akron	Zips	Akron	OH	Public	FBS	Mid-American Conference
University of Alabama	Alabama	Crimson Tide	Tuscaloosa	AL	Public	FBS	Southeastern Conference
University of Alabama at Birmingham	UAB	Blazers	Birmingham	AL	Public	FBS	American Conference
University of Arizona	Arizona	Wildcats	Tucson	AZ	Public	FBS	Big 12 Conference
University of Arkansas	Arkansas	Razorbacks	Fayetteville	AR	Public	FBS	Southeastern Conference
University of Arkansas at Little Rock	Little Rock	Trojans	Little Rock	AR	Public	Non-football	United Athletic Conference
University of Arkansas at Pine Bluff	Arkansas–Pine Bluff	Golden Lions^{[k]}	Pine Bluff	AR	Public	FCS	Southwestern Athletic Conference
University of California, Berkeley	California	Golden Bears	Berkeley	CA	Public	FBS	Atlantic Coast Conference
University of California, Davis	UC Davis	Aggies	Davis	CA	Public	FCS	Mountain West Conference (Note: UC Davis football plays in the Big Sky Conference.)
University of California, Irvine	UC Irvine	Anteaters	Irvine	CA	Public	Non-football	Big West Conference
University of California, Los Angeles	UCLA	Bruins	Los Angeles	CA	Public	FBS	Big Ten Conference
University of California, Riverside	UC Riverside	Highlanders	Riverside	CA	Public	Non-football	Big West Conference
University of California, San Diego	UC San Diego	Tritons	La Jolla	CA	Public	Non-football	Big West Conference (Note: UC San Diego and UC Santa Barbara will join the West Coast Conference in 2027.)
University of California, Santa Barbara	UC Santa Barbara	Gauchos	Santa Barbara (Note: The UCSB campus has a Santa Barbara mailing address, but lies in unincorporated Santa Barbara County within its own census-designated place.)	CA	Public	Non-football	Big West Conference
University of Central Arkansas	Central Arkansas	Bears^{[n]}	Conway	AR	Public	FCS	United Athletic Conference
University of Central Florida	UCF	Knights	Orlando (Note: The main UCF campus has an Orlando mailing address, but is in unincorporated Orange County.)	FL	Public	FBS	Big 12 Conference
University of Cincinnati	Cincinnati	Bearcats	Cincinnati	OH	Public	FBS	Big 12 Conference
University of Colorado Boulder	Colorado	Buffaloes	Boulder	CO	Public	FBS	Big 12 Conference
University of Connecticut	UConn	Huskies	Storrs	CT	Public	FBS	Big East Conference
University of Dayton	Dayton	Flyers	Dayton	OH	Private	FCS	Atlantic 10 Conference
University of Delaware	Delaware	Fightin' Blue Hens	Newark	DE	Public	FBS	Conference USA
University of Denver	Denver	Pioneers	Denver	CO	Private	Non-football	West Coast Conference
University of Detroit Mercy	Detroit Mercy	Titans	Detroit	MI	Private	Non-football	Horizon League
University of Evansville	Evansville	Purple Aces	Evansville	IN	Private	Non-football	Missouri Valley Conference
University of Florida	Florida	Gators	Gainesville	FL	Public	FBS	Southeastern Conference
University of Georgia	Georgia	Bulldogs^{[h]}	Athens	GA	Public	FBS	Southeastern Conference
University of Hawaiʻi at Mānoa	Hawaiʻi	Rainbow Warriors^{[w]}	Honolulu	HI	Public	FBS	Mountain West Conference
University of Houston	Houston	Cougars	Houston	TX	Public	FBS	Big 12 Conference
University of Idaho	Idaho	Vandals	Moscow	ID	Public	FCS	Big Sky Conference
University of Illinois Chicago	UIC	Flames	Chicago	IL	Public	Non-football	Missouri Valley Conference
University of Illinois Urbana-Champaign	Illinois	Fighting Illini	Urbana (Note: The university administration and most of the undergraduate campus are located in Urbana. The athletic department offices and most of the athletic venues are in Champaign and have a Champaign mailing address.)	IL	Public	FBS	Big Ten Conference
University of Iowa	Iowa	Hawkeyes	Iowa City	IA	Public	FBS	Big Ten Conference
University of Kansas	Kansas	Jayhawks	Lawrence	KS	Public	FBS	Big 12 Conference
University of Kentucky	Kentucky	Wildcats	Lexington	KY	Public	FBS	Southeastern Conference
University of Louisiana at Lafayette	Louisiana	Ragin' Cajuns	Lafayette	LA	Public	FBS	Sun Belt Conference
University of Louisiana at Monroe	ULM (Note: National media typically use "Louisiana–Monroe", but the school, the Sun Belt Conference, and the NCAA all primarily use "ULM".)	Warhawks	Monroe	LA	Public	FBS	Sun Belt Conference
University of Louisville	Louisville	Cardinals	Louisville	KY	Public	FBS	Atlantic Coast Conference
University of Maine	Maine	Black Bears	Orono	ME	Public	FCS	America East Conference
University of Maryland, Baltimore County	UMBC	Retrievers	Catonsville (Note: The campus mailing address is Baltimore.)	MD	Public	Non-football	America East Conference
University of Maryland, College Park	Maryland	Terrapins	College Park	MD	Public	FBS	Big Ten Conference
University of Maryland Eastern Shore	Maryland Eastern Shore	Hawks	Princess Anne (Note: The UMES campus has a Princess Anne mailing address, but lies in unincorporated Somerset County.)	MD	Public	Non-football	Mid-Eastern Athletic Conference
University of Massachusetts Amherst	UMass / Massachusetts (Note: The university uses "Massachusetts" and "UMass" interchangeably. The NCAA uses "Massachusetts", while national media typically use "UMass".)	Minutemen^{[au]}	Amherst	MA	Public	FBS	Mid-American Conference
University of Massachusetts Lowell	UMass Lowell	River Hawks	Lowell	MA	Public	Non-football	America East Conference
University of Memphis	Memphis	Tigers	Memphis	TN	Public	FBS	American Conference
University of Miami	Miami (Florida)	Hurricanes	Coral Gables	FL	Private	FBS	Atlantic Coast Conference
University of Michigan	Michigan	Wolverines	Ann Arbor	MI	Public	FBS	Big Ten Conference
University of Minnesota	Minnesota	Golden Gophers	Minneapolis	MN	Public	FBS	Big Ten Conference
University of Mississippi	Ole Miss	Rebels	University	MS	Public	FBS	Southeastern Conference
University of Missouri	Missouri	Tigers	Columbia	MO	Public	FBS	Southeastern Conference
University of Missouri–Kansas City	Kansas City	Roos	Kansas City	MO	Public	Non-football	Summit League
University of Montana	Montana	Grizzlies^{[ak]}	Missoula	MT	Public	FCS	Big Sky Conference
University of Nebraska–Lincoln	Nebraska	Cornhuskers	Lincoln	NE	Public	FBS	Big Ten Conference
University of Nebraska Omaha	Omaha	Mavericks	Omaha	NE	Public	Non-football	Summit League
University of Nevada, Las Vegas	UNLV	Rebels^{[aw]}	Paradise (Note: The U.S. Postal Service considers all unincorporated communities in the Las Vegas Valley, including Paradise, to have a Las Vegas address.)	NV	Public	FBS	Mountain West Conference
University of Nevada, Reno	Nevada	Wolf Pack	Reno	NV	Public	FBS	Mountain West Conference
University of New Hampshire	New Hampshire	Wildcats	Durham	NH	Public	FCS	America East Conference
University of New Mexico	New Mexico	Lobos	Albuquerque	NM	Public	FBS	Mountain West Conference
University of North Alabama	North Alabama	Lions	Florence	AL	Public	FCS	United Athletic Conference
University of North Carolina at Asheville	UNC Asheville	Bulldogs	Asheville	NC	Public	Non-football	Big South Conference
University of North Carolina at Chapel Hill	North Carolina	Tar Heels	Chapel Hill	NC	Public	FBS	Atlantic Coast Conference
University of North Carolina at Charlotte	Charlotte	49ers	Charlotte	NC	Public	FBS	American Conference
University of North Carolina at Greensboro	UNC Greensboro	Spartans	Greensboro	NC	Public	Non-football	Southern Conference
University of North Carolina Wilmington	UNCW (Note: National media outlets generally use "UNC Wilmington", but the school, NCAA, and CAA all use "UNCW".)	Seahawks	Wilmington	NC	Public	Non-football	Coastal Athletic Association
University of North Dakota	North Dakota	Fighting Hawks	Grand Forks	ND	Public	FCS	Summit League
University of Northern Colorado	Northern Colorado	Bears	Greeley	CO	Public	FCS	Big Sky Conference
University of Northern Iowa	Northern Iowa	Panthers	Cedar Falls	IA	Public	FCS	Missouri Valley Conference
University of North Florida	North Florida	Ospreys	Jacksonville	FL	Public	Non-football	Atlantic Sun Conference
University of North Texas	North Texas	Mean Green	Denton	TX	Public	FBS	American Conference
University of Notre Dame	Notre Dame	Fighting Irish	Notre Dame	IN	Private	FBS	Atlantic Coast Conference (Note: Notre Dame football plays as an FBS independent, although it has an extensive cross-scheduling agreement with the ACC in that sport.)
University of Oklahoma	Oklahoma	Sooners	Norman	OK	Public	FBS	Southeastern Conference
University of Oregon	Oregon	Ducks	Eugene	OR	Public	FBS	Big Ten Conference
University of Pennsylvania	Penn	Quakers	Philadelphia	PA	Private	FCS	Ivy League
University of Pittsburgh	Pittsburgh	Panthers	Pittsburgh	PA	Public	FBS	Atlantic Coast Conference
University of Portland	Portland	Pilots	Portland	OR	Private	Non-football	West Coast Conference
University of Rhode Island	Rhode Island	Rams	Kingston	RI	Public	FCS	Atlantic 10 Conference
University of Richmond	Richmond	Spiders	Richmond	VA	Private	FCS	Atlantic 10 Conference
University of Saint Thomas	St. Thomas	Tommies	Saint Paul	MN	Private	FCS	Summit League
University of San Diego	San Diego	Toreros	San Diego	CA	Private	FCS	West Coast Conference (Note: The West Coast Conference does not sponsor football. San Diego, the conference's only football school, plays in the Pioneer Football League.)
University of San Francisco	San Francisco	Dons	San Francisco	CA	Private	Non-football	West Coast Conference
University of South Alabama	South Alabama	Jaguars	Mobile	AL	Public	FBS	Sun Belt Conference
University of South Carolina	South Carolina	Gamecocks	Columbia	SC	Public	FBS	Southeastern Conference
University of South Carolina Upstate	USC Upstate (Note: This is the school's preferred usage, although national media will generally use "South Carolina Upstate".)	Spartans	Spartanburg	SC	Public	Non-football	Big South Conference
University of South Dakota	South Dakota	Coyotes	Vermillion	SD	Public	FCS	Summit League
University of Southern California	USC (Note: This is the school's preferred athletic usage, and is generally used by national media. The NCAA, however, uses "Southern California" (a use accepted by the athletic program) because "USC" can also refer to the University of South Carolina.)	Trojans^{[ax]}	Los Angeles	CA	Private	FBS	Big Ten Conference
University of Southern Indiana	Southern Indiana	Screaming Eagles	Evansville (Note: While Southern Indiana has an Evansville mailing address, it is actually located outside of the Evansville city limits in Perry Township, a subdivision of Vanderburgh County that includes a small part of Evansville proper.)	IN	Public	Non-football	Ohio Valley Conference
University of Southern Mississippi	Southern Miss	Golden Eagles^{[u]}	Hattiesburg	MS	Public	FBS	Sun Belt Conference
University of South Florida	South Florida	Bulls	Tampa	FL	Public	FBS	American Conference
University of the Incarnate Word	Incarnate Word (Note: While national media typically use "Incarnate Word", the school generally uses "UIW", with the NCAA using the latter.)	Cardinals	San Antonio	TX	Private	FCS	Southland Conference
University of the Pacific	Pacific	Tigers	Stockton	CA	Private	Non-football	West Coast Conference
University of Tennessee at Chattanooga	Chattanooga	Mocs	Chattanooga	TN	Public	FCS	Southern Conference
University of Tennessee at Martin	UT Martin	Skyhawks	Martin	TN	Public	FCS	Ohio Valley Conference
University of Tennessee	Tennessee	Volunteers^{[as]}	Knoxville	TN	Public	FBS	Southeastern Conference
University of Texas at Arlington	UT Arlington	Mavericks	Arlington	TX	Public	Non-football	United Athletic Conference
University of Texas at Austin	Texas	Longhorns	Austin	TX	Public	FBS	Southeastern Conference
University of Texas at El Paso	UTEP	Miners	El Paso	TX	Public	FBS	Mountain West Conference
University of Texas Rio Grande Valley	UTRGV (Note: While national sports media generally use "UT Rio Grande Valley", the school, the Southland Conference, and the NCAA all use "UTRGV".)	Vaqueros	Edinburg (Note: While UTRGV has multiple campuses within its service area, its overall and athletic administration are at the Edinburg campus.)	TX	Public	FCS	Southland Conference
University of Texas at San Antonio	UTSA	Roadrunners	San Antonio	TX	Public	FBS	American Conference
University of Toledo	Toledo	Rockets	Toledo	OH	Public	FBS	Mid-American Conference
University of Tulsa	Tulsa	Golden Hurricane	Tulsa	OK	Private	FBS	American Conference
University of Utah	Utah	Utes^{[ay]}	Salt Lake City	UT	Public	FBS	Big 12 Conference
University of Vermont	Vermont	Catamounts	Burlington	VT	Public	Non-football	America East Conference
University of Virginia	Virginia	Cavaliers	Charlottesville (Note: The entire Virginia campus has a Charlottesville mailing address. The university straddles the boundary between Charlottesville and Albemarle County, which encloses but does not include the city of Charlottesville.)	VA	Public	FBS	Atlantic Coast Conference
University of Washington	Washington	Huskies	Seattle	WA	Public	FBS	Big Ten Conference
University of Wisconsin–Green Bay	Green Bay	Phoenix	Green Bay	WI	Public	Non-football	Horizon League
University of Wisconsin–Madison	Wisconsin	Badgers	Madison	WI	Public	FBS	Big Ten Conference
University of Wisconsin–Milwaukee	Milwaukee	Panthers	Milwaukee	WI	Public	Non-football	Horizon League
University of Wyoming	Wyoming	Cowboys^{[ai]}	Laramie	WY	Public	FBS	Mountain West Conference
Utah State University	Utah State	Aggies	Logan	UT	Public	FBS	Pac-12 Conference
Utah Tech University	Utah Tech	Trailblazers	Saint George	UT	Public	FCS	Big Sky Conference
Utah Valley University	Utah Valley	Wolverines	Orem	UT	Public	Non-football	Big West Conference
Valparaiso University	Valparaiso	Beacons	Valparaiso	IN	Private	FCS	Missouri Valley Conference
Vanderbilt University	Vanderbilt	Commodores	Nashville	TN	Private	FBS	Southeastern Conference
Villanova University	Villanova	Wildcats	Villanova (Note: The campus has a Villanova mailing address; that community is a census-designated place that straddles the boundary between Lower Merion and Radnor Townships.)	PA	Private	FCS	Big East Conference
Virginia Commonwealth University	VCU	Rams	Richmond	VA	Public	Non-football	Atlantic 10 Conference
Virginia Military Institute^{[be]}	VMI	Keydets	Lexington	VA	Public	FCS	Southern Conference
Virginia Polytechnic Institute and State University	Virginia Tech	Hokies	Blacksburg	VA	Public	FBS	Atlantic Coast Conference
Wagner College	Wagner	Seahawks	Staten Island	NY	Private	FCS	NEC
Wake Forest University	Wake Forest	Demon Deacons	Winston-Salem	NC	Private	FBS	Atlantic Coast Conference
Washington State University	Washington State	Cougars	Pullman	WA	Public	FBS	Pac-12 Conference
Weber State University	Weber State	Wildcats	Ogden	UT	Public	FCS	Big Sky Conference
Western Carolina University	Western Carolina	Catamounts	Cullowhee	NC	Public	FCS	Southern Conference
Western Illinois University	Western Illinois	Leathernecks	Macomb	IL	Public	FCS	Ohio Valley Conference
Western Kentucky University	Western Kentucky	Hilltoppers^{[az]}	Bowling Green	KY	Public	FBS	Conference USA
Western Michigan University	Western Michigan	Broncos	Kalamazoo	MI	Public	FBS	Mid-American Conference
West Virginia University	West Virginia	Mountaineers	Morgantown	WV	Public	FBS	Big 12 Conference
Wichita State University	Wichita State	Shockers	Wichita	KS	Public	Non-football	American Conference
Winthrop University	Winthrop	Eagles	Rock Hill	SC	Public	Non-football	Big South Conference
Wofford College	Wofford	Terriers	Spartanburg	SC	Private	FCS	Southern Conference
Wright State University	Wright State	Raiders	Dayton (Note: The Wright State campus has a Dayton mailing address but lies well to the east of the city limits in Fairborn.)	OH	Public	Non-football	Horizon League
Xavier University	Xavier	Musketeers	Cincinnati	OH	Private	Non-football	Big East Conference
Yale University	Yale	Bulldogs	New Haven	CT	Private	FCS	Ivy League
Youngstown State University	Youngstown State	Penguins	Youngstown	OH	Public	FCS	Horizon League

=== Notes ===
Conference changes

Football

Locations

Naming conventions

Other

== Transitioning members ==
These schools are at some point in the process of joining Division I, but as of January 2025, have not yet finished the process and thus aren't yet full members. Unless stated otherwise, all transitions begin and end on July 1 of a given year.

Following a change in Division I rules approved in January 2025, new transitions from Division II now require three years, and those from Division III four years. Both are reductions of one year from previous reclassification periods. Additional requirements concerning academic and scholarship metrics were added to the requirements for Division I membership eligibility. Institutions already in the reclassification process may apply the new, shorter reclassification period, if they meet the new academic and scholarship requirements. The dates of full membership shown in the table below assume the reclassifying institutions will elect to apply the new, shorter reclassification period and will qualify to do so.

=== Approved reclassifications ===
All moves between divisions require NCAA approval before commencing. These schools gained this approval and as such have begun their transitions.

School	Common name	Nickname	City	State	Type	Subdivision	Former Div.	Conference	Reclassified	Full member
Mercyhurst University	Mercyhurst	Lakers	Erie	PA	Private	FCS	II	NEC	2024	2027
University of New Haven	New Haven	Chargers	West Haven	CT	Private	FCS	II	NEC	2025	2028
University of West Florida	West Florida	Argonauts	Pensacola	FL	Public	FCS	II	Atlantic Sun Conference (Note: West Florida plays football in the UAC.)	2026	2029
University of West Georgia	West Georgia	Wolves	Carrollton	GA	Public	FCS	II	United Athletic Conference	2024	2027

== Partial members ==
These schools are not members of Division I, but rather are members of Division II or Division III that compete in one or more sports at the Division I level. In many cases, these institutions play in Division I because their divisions do not have championships for a particular sport. The NCAA elevated women's wrestling to full championship status in 2025–26, initially as a "National Collegiate" sport with a single championship event open to all divisions. Of that sport's 124 total programs in 2026–27, only seven are Division I members; 44 are in Division II and 73 in Division III. Two institutions, both Division II members, fielded teams in a Division I sport other than women's wrestling for the first time in the 2026–27 school year. Mercy added men's volleyball, and Shawnee State, which played bowling in the NAIA in 2025–26, aligned fully with the NCAA.

In 2027–28, separate divisional championships will be established for Division II bowling and Division III women's wrestling.

=== Current partial members ===
Returning	Departing	Joining

School	Common name	Teams	Location	State	Type	Division	D-I Sports
Adelphi University	Adelphi	Panthers	Garden City	NY	Private	II	1
Adrian College	Adrian	Bulldogs	Adrian	MI	Private	III	1
Alma College	Alma	Scots	Alma	MI	Private	III	1
American International College	American International	Yellow Jackets	Springfield	MA	Private	II	2
Assumption University	Assumption	Greyhounds	Worcester	MA	Private	II	1
Augusta University	Augusta	Jaguars	Augusta	GA	Public	II	2
Augustana College	Augustana (IL)	Vikings	Rock Island	IL	Private	III	3
Augustana University	Augustana (SD)	Vikings	Sioux Falls	SD	Private	II	1
Aurora University	Aurora	Spartans	Aurora	IL	Private	III	1
Austin College	Austin	Kangaroos	Sherman	TX	Private	III	2
Azusa Pacific University	Azusa Pacific	Cougars	Azusa	CA	Private	III	1
Babson College	Babson	Beavers	Wellesley	MA	Private	III	1
Barton College	Barton	Bulldogs	Wilson	NC	Private	II	1
Bates College	Bates	Bobcats	Lewiston	ME	Private	III	1
Belmont Abbey College	Belmont Abbey	Crusaders	Belmont	NC	Private	II	2
Bemidji State University	Bemidji State	Beavers	Bemidji	MN	Public	II	2
Benedict College	Benedict	Tigers	Columbia	SC	Private	II	1
Bentley University	Bentley	Falcons	Waltham	MA	Private	II	1
Biola University	Biola	Eagles	La Mirada	CA	Private	II	2
Bowdoin College	Bowdoin	Polar Bears	Brunswick	ME	Private	III	1
Bowie State University	Bowie State	Bulldogs	Bowie	MD	Public	II	1
Brandeis University	Brandeis	Judges	Waltham	MA	Private	III	1
Caldwell University	Caldwell	Cougars	Caldwell	NJ	Private	II	1
California Institute of Technology	Caltech	Beavers	Pasadena	CA	Private	III	3
California Lutheran University	Cal Lutheran	Kingsmen^{[ba]}	Thousand Oaks	CA	Private	III	2
California State University, East Bay	Cal State East Bay	Pioneers	Hayward	CA	Public	II	1
California State University, Los Angeles	Cal State Los Angeles	Golden Eagles	Los Angeles	CA	Public	II	1
California State University, Monterey Bay	Cal State Monterey Bay	Otters	Seaside	CA	Public	II	1
Carson–Newman University	Carson–Newman	Eagles	Jefferson City	TN	Private	II	1
Carthage College	Carthage	Firebirds	Kenosha	WI	Private	III	1
Catawba College	Catawba	Indians	Salisbury	NC	Private	II	1
Centenary College of Louisiana	Centenary	Gentlemen^{[m]}	Shreveport	LA	Private	III	1
Central State University	Central State	Marauders^{[p]}	Wilberforce	OH	Public	II	1
Chapman University	Chapman	Panthers	Orange	CA	Private	III	2
Chatham University	Chatham	Cougars	Pittsburgh	PA	Private	III	1
Chestnut Hill College	Chestnut Hill	Griffins	Philadelphia	PA	Private	II	1
Chowan University	Chowan	Hawks	Murfreesboro	NC	Private	II	1
City College of the City University of New York	CCNY	Beavers	New York	NY	Public	III	2
Claremont McKenna College, Harvey Mudd College, and Scripps College^{[bb]}	Claremont-Mudd-Scripps	Stags^{[bc]}	Claremont	CA	Private	III	2
Clarkson University	Clarkson	Golden Knights	Potsdam	NY	Private	III	1
Coe College	Coe	Kohawks	Cedar Rapids	IA	Private	III	1
Coker University	Coker	Cobras	Hartsville	SC	Private	II	1
Colby–Sawyer College	Colby–Sawyer	Chargers	New London	NH	Private	III	1
Colby College	Colby	Mules	Waterville	ME	Private	III	1
Colorado College	Colorado College	Tigers	Colorado Springs	CO	Private	III	2
Colorado Mesa University	Colorado Mesa	Mavericks	Grand Junction	CO	Public	II	1
Commonwealth University-Bloomsburg	Bloomsburg	Huskies	Bloomsburg	PA	Public	II	1
Commonwealth University-Lock Haven	Lock Haven	Bald Eagles	Lock Haven	PA	Public	II	2
Concord University	Concord	Mountain Lions	Athens	WV	Public	II	1
Concordia University Irvine	Concordia	Eagles	Irvine	CA	Private	II	4
Connecticut College	Connecticut College	Camels	New London	CT	Private	III	2
D'Youville University	D'Youville	Saints	Buffalo	NY	Private	II	1
Daemen University	Daemen	Wildcats	Amherst	NY	Private	II	2
Dallas Baptist University	Dallas Baptist	Patriots	Dallas	TX	Private	II	1
Delaware Valley University	Delaware Valley	Aggies	Doylestown	PA	Private	III	1
Drew University	Drew	Rangers	Madison	NJ	Private	III	2
Drury University	Drury	Panthers	Springfield	MO	Private	II	1
Eckerd College	Eckerd	Tritons	Saint Petersburg	FL	Private	II	1
Edward Waters University	Edward Waters	Tigers	Jacksonville	FL	Private	II	1
Elizabeth City State University	Elizabeth City State	Vikings	Elizabeth City	NC	Public	II	1
Elmhurst University	Elmhurst	Bluejays	Elmhurst	IL	Private	III	1
Emmanuel University	Emmanuel	Lions	Franklin Springs	GA	Private	II	2
Erskine College	Erskine	Flying Fleet	Due West	SC	Private	II	2
Fairmont State University	Fairmont State	Fighting Falcons	Fairmont	WV	Public	II	1
Fayetteville State University	Fayetteville State	Broncos^{[r]}	Fayetteville	NC	Public	II	1
Felician University	Felician	Golden Falcons	Rutherford	NJ	Private	II	1
Ferris State University	Ferris State	Bulldogs	Big Rapids	MI	Public	II	1
Florida Southern College	Florida Southern	Moccasins	Lakeland	FL	Private	II	1
Fort Valley State University	Fort Valley State	Wildcats	Fort Valley	GA	Public	II	1
Francis Marion University	Francis Marion	Patriots	Florence	SC	Public	II	1
Franklin & Marshall College	Franklin & Marshall	Diplomats	Lancaster	PA	Private	III	1
Franklin Pierce University	Franklin Pierce	Ravens	Rindge	NH	Private	II	2
Fresno Pacific University	Fresno Pacific	Sunbirds	Fresno	CA	Private	II	2
Gannon University	Gannon	Golden Knights	Erie	PA	Private	II	2
Gettysburg College	Gettysburg	Bullets	Gettysburg	PA	Private	III	1
Grove City College	Grove City	Wolverines	Grove City	PA	Private	III	1
Gustavus Adolphus College	Gustavus Adolphus	Golden Gusties	Saint Peter	MN	Private	III	2
Hamline University	Hamline	Pipers	Saint Paul	MN	Private	III	1
Haverford College	Haverford	Fords	Haverford	PA	Private	III	2
Hilbert College	Hilbert	Hawks	Hamburg	NY	Private	III	1
Hobart and William Smith Colleges	Hobart	Statesmen	Geneva	NY	Private	III	1
Hunter College	Hunter	Hawks	New York	NY	Public	III	2
Huntingdon College	Huntingdon	Hawks	Montgomery	AL	Private	III	1
Illinois Wesleyan University	Illinois Wesleyan	Titans	Bloomington	IL	Private	III	1
Ithaca College	Ithaca	Bombers	Ithaca	NY	Private	III	1
John Jay College of Criminal Justice	John Jay	Bloodhounds	New York	NY	Public	III	1
Johns Hopkins University	Johns Hopkins	Blue Jays	Baltimore	MD	Private	III	2
Johnson C. Smith University	Johnson C. Smith	Golden Bulls^{[y]}	Charlotte	NC	Private	II	1
Kentucky State University	Kentucky State	Thorobreds^{[aa]}	Frankfort	KY	Public	II	1
Kentucky Wesleyan College	Kentucky Wesleyan	Panthers	Owensboro	KY	Private	II	1
Keystone College	Keystone	Giants	La Plume	PA	Private	III	1
King University	King	Tornado	Bristol	TN	Private	II	1
Kutztown University of Pennsylvania	Kutztown	Golden Bears	Kutztown	PA	Public	II	1
Lakeland University	Lakeland	Muskies	Plymouth	WI	Private	III	1
Lake Superior State University	Lake Superior State	Lakers	Sault Sainte Marie	MI	Public	II	1
Lawrence University	Lawrence	Vikings	Appleton	WI	Private	III	1
Lees–McRae College	Lees–McRae	Bobcats	Banner Elk	NC	Private	II	1
LeMoyne–Owen College	LeMoyne–Owen	Magicians	Memphis	TN	Private	II	1
Lewis University	Lewis	Flyers	Romeoville	IL	Private	II	2
Limestone University	Limestone	Saints	Gaffney	SC	Private	II	1
Lincoln Memorial University	Lincoln Memorial	Railsplitters	Harrogate	TN	Private	II	3
Livingstone College	Livingstone	Blue Bears	Salisbury	NC	Private	II	1
Macalester College	Macalester	Scots	Saint Paul	MN	Private	III	1
Marian University	Marian	Sabres	Fond du Lac	WI	Private	III	1
Maryville University of Saint Louis	Maryville	Saints	Town and Country	MO	Private	II	2
Massachusetts Institute of Technology	MIT	Engineers	Cambridge	MA	Private	III	4
Massachusetts Maritime Academy	Mass Maritime	Buccaneers	Buzzards Bay	MA	Public	III	1
McKendree University	McKendree	Bearcats	Lebanon	IL	Private	II	5
Menlo College	Menlo	Oaks	Atherton	CA	Private	II	1
Mercy University	Mercy	Mavericks	Dobbs Ferry	NY	Private	II	1
Michigan Technological University	Michigan Tech	Huskies	Houghton	MI	Public	II	2
Middlebury College	Middlebury	Panthers	Middlebury	VT	Private	III	1
Millikin University	Millikin	Big Blue	Decatur	IL	Private	III	1
Minnesota State University, Mankato	Minnesota State	Mavericks	Mankato	MN	Public	II	2
Missouri University of Science and Technology	Missouri S&T	Miners	Rolla	MO	Public	II	1
Molloy University	Molloy	Lions	Rockville Centre	NY	Private	II	1
Morehouse College	Morehouse	Maroon Tigers	Atlanta	GA	Private	II	1
Mount Aloysius College	Mount Aloysius	Mounties	Cresson	PA	Private	III	1
Mount St. Joseph University	Mount St. Joseph	Lions	Delhi Township (Note: The campus has a Cincinnati mailing address.)	OH	Private	III	1
New York University	NYU	Violets	New York	NY	Private	III	1
North Central College	North Central	Cardinals	Naperville	IL	Private	III	1
Northeastern State University	Northeastern State	RiverHawks	Tahlequah	OK	Public	II	1
Northern Michigan University	Northern Michigan	Wildcats	Marquette	MI	Public	II	2
North Greenville University	North Greenville	Crusaders	Tigerville	SC	Private	II	1
Occidental College	Occidental	Tigers	Los Angeles	CA	Private	III	2
Oklahoma Christian University	Oklahoma Christian	Eagles^{[bf]}	Oklahoma City	OK	Private	II	1
Palm Beach Atlantic University	Palm Beach Atlantic	Sailfish	West Palm Beach	FL	Private	II	1
Pennsylvania State University Altoona	Penn State Altoona	Nittany Lions	Altoona	PA	Public	III	1
Pennsylvania State University Erie, The Behrend College	Penn State Behrend	Lions	Erie	PA	Public	III	3
Pennsylvania Western University – Clarion	Clarion	Golden Eagles	Clarion	PA	Public	II	1
Pennsylvania Western University – Edinboro	Edinboro	Fighting Scots	Edinboro	PA	Public	II	1
Pomona College and Pitzer College^{[bd]}	Pomona-Pitzer	Sagehens	Claremont	CA	Private	III	2
Plymouth State University	Plymouth State	Panthers	Plymouth	NH	Public	III	1
Post University	Post	Eagles	Waterbury	CT	Private	II	2
Principia College	Principia	Panthers	Elsah	IL	Private	III	1
Queens College, City University of New York	Queens (New York)	Knights	New York	NY	Public	II	2
Quincy University	Quincy	Hawks	Quincy	IL	Private	II	2
Rensselaer Polytechnic Institute	RPI	Engineers	Troy	NY	Private	III	2
Rhode Island College	Rhode Island College	Anchormen^{[ao]}	Providence	RI	Public	III	1
Roberts Wesleyan University	Roberts Wesleyan	Redhawks	North Chili	NY	Private	II	1
Rochester Institute of Technology	RIT	Tigers	Henrietta	NY	Private	III	2
Rockhurst University	Rockhurst	Hawks	Kansas City	MO	Private	II	1
Roosevelt University	Roosevelt	Lakers	Chicago	IL	Private	II	1
Rose–Hulman Institute of Technology	RHIT	Fightin' Engineers	Terre Haute	IN	Private	III	1
Saint Anselm College	Saint Anselm	Hawks	Goffstown	NH	Private	II (Note: Saint Anselm will start a transition to Division III in 2027. Of its two current de facto D-I sports, women's bowling will continue in that status (as it does not have a D-III championship), while women's ice hockey will become D-III.)	2
Saint Cloud State University	St. Cloud State	Huskies	Saint Cloud	MN	Public	II	3
Saint Lawrence University	St. Lawrence	Saints	Canton	NY	Private	III	3
Saint Leo University	Saint Leo	Lions	Saint Leo	FL	Private	II	1
Saint Michael's College	Saint Michael's	Purple Knights	Colchester	VT	Private	II	2
Saint Olaf College	St. Olaf	Oles	Northfield	MN	Private	III	1
Saint Thomas Aquinas College	St. Thomas Aquinas	Spartans	Sparkill	NY	Private	II	1
Saint Vincent College	Saint Vincent	Bearcats	Unity	PA	Private	III	1
Salem University	Salem	Tigers	Salem	WV	Private	II (Note: Salem will start a transition to the NAIA in 2027. Of its two current de facto D-I sports, both men's and women's water polo can be downgraded to club status (as they do not have NAIA championships).)	2
Shaw University	Shaw	Bears	Raleigh	NC	Private	II	1
Simpson College	Simpson	Storm	Indianola	IA	Private	III	2
Smith College	Smith	Bears	Northampton	MA	Private	III	1
Southern Connecticut State University	Southern Connecticut	Owls	New Haven	CT	Public	II	1
Southern New Hampshire University	SNHU	Penmen	Manchester	NH	Private	II	1
Southwest Baptist University	Southwest Baptist	Bearcats	Bolivar	MO	Private	II	2
Springfield College	Springfield	Pride	Springfield	MA	Private	III	2
Spring Hill College	Spring Hill	Badgers	Mobile	AL	Private	II	1
State University of New York at Brockport	Brockport	Golden Eagles	Brockport	NY	Public	III	1
State University of New York at Cortland	Cortland	Red Dragons	Cortland	NY	Public	III	1
State University of New York Maritime College	Maritime	Privateers	New York	NY	Public	III	1
Stevens Institute of Technology	Stevens Tech	Ducks	Hoboken	NJ	Private	III	2
Stevenson University	Stevenson	Mustangs	Owings Mills	MD	Private	III	1
Texas A&M University–Kingsville	Texas A&M–Kingsville	Javelinas	Kingsville	TX	Public	II	1
Texas Woman's University	Texas Woman's	Pioneers	Denton	TX	Public	II	1
The College of Saint Scholastica	St. Scholastica	Saints	Duluth	MN	Private	III	1
The University of Maine at Presque Isle	UMPI	Owls	Presque Isle	ME	Public	III	1
The University of Tampa	Tampa	Spartans	Tampa	FL	Private	II	1
Tufts University	Tufts	Jumbos	Medford	MA	Private	III	1
Tusculum University	Tusculum	Pioneers	Tusculum	TN	Private	II	2
Union College	Union College	Garnet Chargers	Schenectady	NY	Private	III	2
United States Coast Guard Academy	Coast Guard	Bears	New London	CT	Federal	III	1
University of Alaska Anchorage	Alaska Anchorage	Seawolves	Anchorage	AK	Public	II	1
University of Alaska Fairbanks	Alaska	Nanooks	Fairbanks	AK	Public	II	3
University of Bridgeport	Bridgeport	Purple Knights	Bridgeport	CT	Private	II	1
University of California, Merced	UC Merced	Golden Bobcats	Merced	CA	Public	II	2
University of Central Missouri	Central Missouri	Mules^{[o]}	Warrensburg	MO	Public	II	1
University of Charleston	Charleston (West Virginia)	Golden Eagles	Charleston	WV	Private	II	1
University of Jamestown	Jamestown	Jimmies	Jamestown	ND	Private	II	1
University of La Verne	La Verne	Leopards	La Verne	CA	Private	III	2
University of Minnesota Duluth	Minnesota Duluth	Bulldogs	Duluth	MN	Public	II	2
University of Mount Olive	Mount Olive	Trojans	Mount Olive	NC	Private	II	1
University of North Georgia	North Georgia	Nighthawks	Dahlonega	GA	Public	II	1
University of Pittsburgh at Bradford	Pitt–Bradford	Panthers	Bradford	PA	Public	III	1
University of Redlands	Redlands	Bulldogs	Redlands	CA	Private	III	2
University of Wisconsin–Eau Claire	Wisconsin–Eau Claire	Blugolds	Eau Claire	WI	Public	III	1
University of Wisconsin–La Crosse	Wisconsin–La Crosse	Eagles	La Crosse	WI	Public	III	1
University of Wisconsin–Oshkosh	Wisconsin–Oshkosh	Titans	Oshkosh	WI	Public	III	1
University of Wisconsin–Stout	Wisconsin–Stout	Blue Devils	Menomonie	WI	Public	III	1
University of Wisconsin–Whitewater	Wisconsin–Whitewater	Warhawks	Whitewater	WI	Public	III	2
Upper Iowa University	Upper Iowa	Peacocks	Fayette	IA	Private	II	1
Ursinus College	Ursinus	Bears	Collegeville	PA	Private	III	1
Ursuline College	Ursuline	Arrows	Pepper Pike	OH	Private	II	1
Utica University	Utica	Pioneers	Utica	NY	Private	III	1
Vanguard University	Vanguard	Lions	Costa Mesa	CA	Private	II	1
Vassar College	Vassar	Brewers	Poughkeepsie	NY	Private	III	1
Vermont State University Castleton	Castleton	Spartans	Castleton	VT	Public	III	1
Virginia State University	Virginia State	Trojans	Ettrick	VA	Public	II	1
Virginia Union University	Virginia Union	Panthers	Richmond	VA	Private	II	1
Walsh University	Walsh	Cavaliers	North Canton	OH	Private	II	1
Washington & Jefferson College	Washington & Jefferson	Presidents	Washington	PA	Private	III	2
Wayne State College	Wayne State (Nebraska)	Wildcats	Wayne	NE	Public	II	1
Wayne State University	Wayne State (Michigan)	Warriors	Detroit	MI	Public	II	1
Wellesley College	Wellesley	Blue	Wellesley	MA	Private	III	2
West Chester University of Pennsylvania	West Chester	Golden Rams	West Chester	PA	Public	II	1
Western Colorado University	Western Colorado	Mountaineers	Gunnison	CO	Public	II	1
Westminster University	Westminster	Griffins	Salt Lake City	UT	Private	II	1
Whittier College	Whittier	Poets	Whittier	CA	Private	III	2
Williams College	Williams	Ephs	Williamstown	MA	Private	III	1
Wilmington University	Wilmington	Wildcats	New Castle	DE	Private	II	1
Wilson College	Wilson	Phoenix	Chambersburg	PA	Private	III	1
Winona State University	Winona State	Warriors	Winona	MN	Public	II	1
Wittenberg University	Wittenberg	Tigers	Springfield	OH	Private	III	2
Yeshiva University	Yeshiva	Maccabees	New York	NY	Private	III	2

=== Future partial members ===
These schools that are members of other divisions, or of the NAIA or NJCAA, have announced their intentions to field at least one team at the Division I level sometime after the 2026–27 school year. NAIA or NJCAA members listed here have either started transitions to the NCAA or planned to do so.

Years of joining reflect calendar years. For schools that will play only spring sports at the D-I level, the calendar year of joining is the year before the first season of competition.

School	Common name	Teams	Location	State	Type	Division	Joining	Future D-I sport(s)
Monroe University	Monroe	Mustangs	New Rochelle	NY	Private	II	2028	Men's volleyball
Texas A&M University–Texarkana	Texas A&M–Texarkana	Eagles	Texarkana	TX	Public	II	2027	Beach volleyball

== Former full members ==
This list includes institutions that sponsored athletic programs that competed at the highest level in the NCAA (Division I 1973–present, University Division 1957–1973). Schools that were deemed major schools in athletics before 1957 are not included in this list.

School	Common name	Teams	Location	State	Type	Last season	Current affiliation	Primary conference
Armstrong State University (Note: In 2017, Armstrong State University was consolidated with Georgia Southern University.)	Armstrong	Pirates and Lady Pirates	Savannah	GA	Public	1987	N/A	None (Note: Discontinued all athletics in 2017.)
Augusta University (Note: Formerly known as Augusta State University until January 2013, when it merged with another Augusta institution (Georgia Health Sciences University) to create Georgia Regents University. At the time of the merger, only GRU (as Augusta State) had an athletic program, and GRU's sports teams continued to compete as Augusta State through the end of the 2012–13 school year. The school changed its name again to the current Augusta University in 2015.) (Note: Currently competes in Division I in men's and women's golf.)	Augusta	Jaguars	Augusta	GA	Public	1991	II	Peach Belt Conference
Birmingham–Southern College	Birmingham–Southern	Panthers	Birmingham	AL	Private	2006	N/A	None (Note: Closed at the end of the 2023–24 school year.)
Brooklyn College	Brooklyn	Bulldogs	New York	NY	Public	1992	III	City University of New York Athletic Conference
California State University, Los Angeles	Cal State Los Angeles	Golden Eagles	Los Angeles	CA	Public	1975	II	California Collegiate Athletic Association
Catholic University of America	Catholic (DC)	Cardinals	Washington	DC	Private	1981	III	Landmark Conference
Centenary College of Louisiana	Centenary (LA)	Gentlemen and Ladies	Shreveport	LA	Private	2011	III	Southern Collegiate Athletic Conference
Gettysburg College	Gettysburg	Bullets	Gettysburg	PA	Private	1974	III	Centennial Conference
Hardin–Simmons University	Hardin–Simmons	Cowboys and Cowgirls	Abilene	TX	Private	1990	III	American Southwest Conference
Kentucky Wesleyan College	Kentucky Wesleyan	Panthers	Owensboro	KY	Private	1958	II	Great Midwest Athletic Conference
Long Island University Brooklyn	LIU Brooklyn	Blackbirds	Brooklyn	NY	Private	2019	N/A	None (Note: After the 2018–19 season, Long Island University merged the athletic programs of its two campuses—the Division I LIU Brooklyn Blackbirds and Division II LIU Post Pioneers—into a single athletic program, the LIU Sharks. The Sharks inherited the athletic legacy of the Brooklyn campus, including its Division I membership, and continues to compete in Division I under the unified LIU name.)
Loyola University New Orleans (Note: Loyola (LA) will rejoin the NCAA in 2027, joining Division II and the Gulf South Conference.)	Loyola (LA)	Wolf Pack	New Orleans	LA	Private	1972	NAIA	Southern States Athletic Conference
Morris Brown College	Morris Brown	Wolverines and Lady Wolverines	Atlanta	GA	Private	2003	N/A	None (Note: Discontinued all athletics in 2003.)
Muhlenberg College	Muhlenberg	Mules	Allentown	PA	Private	1963	III	Centennial Conference
Northeastern Illinois University	Northeastern Illinois	Golden Eagles	Chicago	IL	Public	1998	N/A	None (Note: Discontinued all athletics in 1998.)
New York University	NYU	Violets	New York	NY	Private	1981	III	University Athletic Association
Oklahoma City University	Oklahoma City	Stars	Oklahoma City	OK	Private	1985	NAIA	Sooner Athletic Conference
Regis University	Regis (CO)	Rangers	Denver	CO	Private	1964	II	Rocky Mountain Athletic Conference
Saint Francis College	St. Francis Brooklyn	Terriers	Brooklyn	NY	Private	2023	N/A	None (Note: Discontinued all athletics in 2023.)
Saint Francis University	Saint Francis (PA)	Red Flash (Note: Nickname changed to Red Wolves after the 2025–26 school year.)	Loretto	PA	Private	2026	III	Presidents' Athletic Conference
Savannah State University	Savannah State	Tigers and Lady Tigers	Savannah	GA	Public	2019	II	Southern Intercollegiate Athletic Conference
Trinity University	Trinity (TX)	Tigers	San Antonio	TX	Private	1973	III	Southern Collegiate Athletic Conference
United States International University (Note: In 2001, United States International University (USIU) merged with California School of Professional Psychology to form the current Alliant University. USIU sponsored Division I sports.)	USIU	Gulls	San Diego (Note: United States International University was located in San Diego but after the merger with California School of Professional Psychology the school also has locations in San Francisco, Los Angeles, Irvine, Sacramento, and Fresno.)	CA	Private	1991	N/A	None (Note: Discontinued all athletics in 2007.)
University of Baltimore	Baltimore	Super Bees	Baltimore	MD	Public	1983	N/A	None (Note: Discontinued all athletics in 1983.)
University of Hartford	Hartford	Hawks	Hartford	CT	Private	2023	III	Conference of New England
University of Texas–Pan American	UTPA	Broncs	Edinburg	TX	Public	2015	N/A	None (Note: In 2015, UTPA merged with the University of Texas at Brownsville to create the new University of Texas Rio Grande Valley. The merged university inherited UTPA's Division I membership, and continues to compete in Division I under the UTRGV Vaqueros name.)
Utica University	Utica	Pioneers	Utica	NY	Private	1987	III	Empire 8
Washington and Lee University	Washington and Lee	Generals	Lexington	VA	Private	1959	III	Old Dominion Athletic Conference
Washington University in St. Louis	WashU	Bears	St. Louis	MO	Private	1960	III	University Athletic Association
West Chester University	West Chester	Golden Rams	West Chester	PA	Public	1982	II	Pennsylvania State Athletic Conference
West Texas A&M University	West Texas A&M	Buffaloes	Canyon	TX	Public	1986	II	Lone Star Conference

== See also ==
- List of NCAA Division I athletic directors
- List of NCAA Division I conference changes in the 2010s
- List of NCAA Division I conference changes in the 2020s
- List of NCAA Division II institutions
- List of NCAA Division III institutions

== Notes ==
- ^{h} Alabama A&M, Georgia, and South Carolina State use the name Lady Bulldogs for their women's teams.
- ^{i} Alabama State and Delaware State use the name Lady Hornets for their women's teams.
- ^{j} Alcorn State uses the name Lady Braves for its women's teams.
- ^{k} Arkansas–Pine Bluff uses the name Golden Lady Lions for its women's teams.
- ^{m} Centenary uses the name Ladies for its women's teams.
- ^{n} Central Arkansas uses the name Sugar Bears for its women's teams.
- ^{o} Central Missouri uses the name Jennies for its women's teams.
- ^{p} Central State uses the name Lady Marauders for its women's teams.
- ^{q} Hampton use the name Lady Pirates for their women's teams.
- ^{r} Fayetteville State uses the name Lady Broncos for its women's teams.
- ^{s} Florida A&M uses the name Lady Rattlers for its women's teams.
- ^{u} Georgia Southern and Southern Miss use the name Lady Eagles for their women's teams.
- ^{v} Grambling, Jackson State, Tennessee State, and Texas Southern use the name Lady Tigers for their women's teams, while LSU uses it for select women's teams.
- ^{w} Hawaiʻi uses the name Rainbow Wāhine for its women's teams. The women's beach volleyball team, while officially Rainbow Wāhine, more commonly uses BeachBows.
- ^{x} Howard uses the name Lady Bison for its women's teams.
- ^{y} Johnson C. Smith uses the name Lady Golden Bulls for its women's teams.
- ^{aa} Kentucky State uses the name Thorobrettes for its women's teams.
- ^{ab} Lamar uses the name Lady Cardinals for its women's teams.
- ^{ac} Liberty uses the name Lady Flames for its women's teams.
- ^{ad} Lipscomb uses the name Lady Bisons for its women's teams.
- ^{ae} Louisiana Tech uses the name Lady Techsters for its women's teams.
- ^{af} Manhattan uses the name Lady Jaspers for its women's teams.
- ^{ah} McNeese, Oklahoma State, and Wyoming use the name Cowgirls for their women's teams.
- ^{ai} Mississippi Valley State uses the name Devilettes for its women's teams.
- ^{aj} Morgan State uses the name Lady Bears for their women's teams, while Missouri State uses it for its women's basketball team. Missouri State uses Beach Bears for its women's beach volleyball team.
- ^{ak} Montana uses the name Lady Griz for its women's basketball team.
- ^{al} Northwestern State uses the name Lady Demons for its women's teams.
- ^{am} Old Dominion uses the name Lady Monarchs for its women's teams but not its volleyball team.
- ^{an} Prairie View A&M uses the name Lady Panthers for its women's teams.
- ^{ao} Rhode Island College uses the name Anchorwomen for its women's teams.
- ^{ap} Southeastern Louisiana uses the name Lady Lions for their women's teams, while Penn State uses it for its women's basketball team.
- ^{aq} Southern uses the name Lady Jaguars for its women's teams.
- ^{ar} Stephen F. Austin uses the name Ladyjacks for its women's teams.
- ^{as} Tennessee uses the name Lady Volunteers for select women's teams.
- ^{at} Texas Tech uses the name Lady Raiders for select women's teams.
- ^{au} UMass uses the name Minutewomen for its women's teams.
- ^{av} Union College uses the name Dutchwomen for its women's teams.
- ^{aw} UNLV uses the names Lady Rebels and Runnin' Rebels for its women's basketball team and its men's basketball team, respectively.
- ^{ax} USC uses the name Women of Troy in addition to the name Trojans for its women's teams.
- ^{ay} Utah uses the names Red Rocks and Runnin' Utes in addition to the name Utes for its women's gymnastics team and its men's basketball team, respectively.
- ^{az} Western Kentucky uses the name Lady Toppers for its women's teams.
- ^{ba} Cal Lutheran uses the name Regals for its women's teams.
- ^{bb} A combined team of Claremont McKenna College, Harvey Mudd College, and Scripps College.
- ^{bc} The combined team of Claremont McKenna College, Harvey Mudd College, and Scripps College uses the name Athenas for its women's teams.
- ^{bd} A combined team of Pomona College and Pitzer College.
- ^{be} The school does not sponsor women's basketball.
- ^{bf} Oklahoma Christian uses the name Lady Eagles for its women's teams.
