= Morgan State Bears and Lady Bears =

Intercollegiate sports teams of Morgan State University

- University: Morgan State University
- NCAA: Division I (FCS)
- Conference: Mid-Eastern Athletic Conference
- Athletic director: Dena Freeman-Patton
- Location: Baltimore, Maryland
- Varsity teams: 16
- Football stadium: Hughes Stadium
- Basketball arena: Talmadge L. Hill Field House
- Nickname: Bears
- Colors: Blue and orange
- Mascot: Benny the Bear
- Fight song: "We are the Bears"
- Website: morganstatebears.com
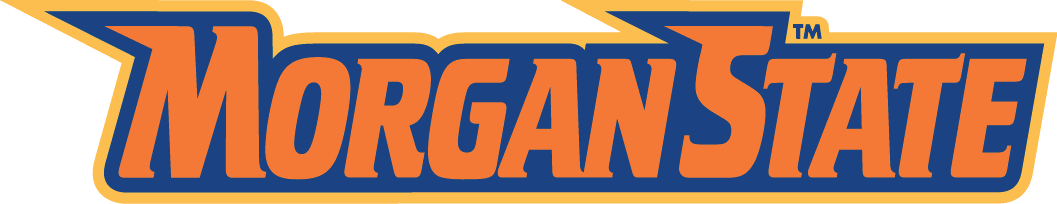

The Morgan State Bears are the sixteen varsity sports teams representing Morgan State University in Baltimore, Maryland in intercollegiate athletics, including men and women's basketball, men and women's cross country, men and women's tennis and men and women's track and field; women's-only bowling, women’s-only softball, and women’s-only volleyball; women’s-only acrobatics & tumbling, men’s-only wrestling, cheerleading, and men's-only football. The Bears compete in the NCAA Division I FCS and are members of the Mid-Eastern Athletic Conference.

== Teams ==
Men's sports	Women's sports
Basketball	Basketball
Cross country	Bowling
Football	Cross country
Tennis	Softball
Track and field^{†}	Tennis
Wrestling	Track and field^{†}
	Volleyball
† – Track and field includes both indoor and outdoor

== Rivals ==
Morgan State and Howard University are historic rivals. The two teams have met 73 times in football. Morgan State leads the series 43–29–1.

== Track and field ==
From 1951 to 1955, Morgan State had a relay team known as The Flying Four that included Otis Johnson and Josh Culbreath. The team specialized in the 4 × 400 metres relay or its imperial distance equivalent and won several major American championships.

== Wrestling ==
In October 2021, the school announced their plans to resurrect a wrestling team that last competed in 1997. The program started in 2023, with NCAA Champion and Olympic Gold Medalist Kenny Monday as their head coach. Morgan State wrestled as an independent in 2023 before joining the EIWA for the 2024-25 season. Heavyweight Xavier Doolin was an NCAA tournament alternate for the 2024-25 season, the program's second year. The 2025-26 season saw Eugene Harney win the 149 pound EIWA title and Yannis Charles a finalist at 157 pounds to become Morgan State's first NCAA qualifiers since the program's revival. Morgan State finished eighth out of twelve teams in the EIWA tournament. The school finished T51 with 2.5 points at the NCAA Tournament.
