= 2026 Mid-Eastern Athletic Conference softball tournament =

College softball tournament in Virginia

- Teams: 6
- Format: Double-elimination tournament
- Finals site: Townebank Softball Field; Norfolk, Virginia
- Champions: Howard (4th title)
- Winning coach: Shellie Cousins (3rd title)
- MVP: Maryn Jordan (Howard)
- Television: ESPN+

2026 Mid-Eastern Athletic Conference softball standings
	Conf.				Overall
Team	W		L	PCT	W		L	PCT
Howard ‍†‍‡‍^{y}	18	–	3	.857	29	–	19	.604
Delaware State ‍‍‍	15	–	6	.714	28	–	17	.622
South Carolina State ‍‍‍	12	–	9	.571	22	–	19	.537
Norfolk State ‍‍‍	12	–	9	.571	22	–	21	.512
Morgan State ‍‍‍	9	–	12	.429	15	–	28	.349
Coppin State ‍‍‍	7	–	14	.333	9	–	27	.250
North Carolina Central ‍‍‍	6	–	15	.286	8	–	40	.167
Maryland Eastern Shore ‍‍‍	5	–	16	.238	15	–	33	.313
† – Conference champion ‡ – Tournament champion y – Invited to the NCAA tournament As of May 17, 2026; Rankings from NFCA/USA Today

The 2026 Mid-Eastern Athletic Conference softball tournament was held at Townebank Softball Field on the campus of Norfolk State University in Norfolk, Virginia from May 6 through May 9, 2026. The tournament was won by the Howard Bison, who earned the Mid-Eastern Athletic Conference's automatic bid to the 2026 NCAA Division I softball tournament.

== Format and seeding ==
The top six finishers of the league's eight teams from the regular season qualified for the tournament. The top two seeds received a single bye, with the remaining teams playing opening round games.

== Tournament ==
Upper round 1
4	Norfolk State	3
5	Morgan State	6
3	South Carolina State	8^{(6)}
6	Coppin State	0
Lower round 1
3	Norfolk State	8
2	Delaware State	9
6	Coppin State	4
5	Morgan State	3

Upper round 2
1	Howard	11^{(6)}
5	Morgan State	2
2	Delaware State	3
3	South Carolina State	8
Lower round 2
2	Delaware State	3^{(9)}
6	Coppin State	2

Upper final
1	Howard	13^{(5)}
3	South Carolina State	4
Lower final
3	South Carolina State	3
2	Delaware State	1

Final
1	Howard	11^{(5)}	—
2	Central Arkansas	2	—

== All Tournament Team ==
Player	Team
Karly Cain	Delaware State
Kristin White	Delaware State
Chandler Martin	Delaware State
Millie Cousins	Morgan State
Olivia Garner	Morgan State
Maddy Morris	Norfolk State
Dallas Hill	South Carolina State
Dymond Roundtree	South Carolina State
**Maryn Jordan**	Howard
Julia Holt	Howard
Makyia Taylor	Howard

MVP in bold
