= 2020 Clemson Tigers softball team =

American college softball season

2020 Clemson Tigers softball
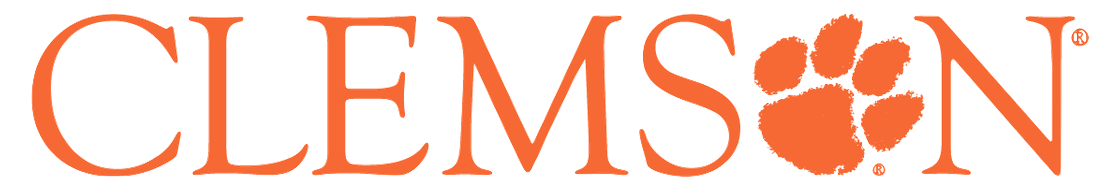
- Conference: Atlantic Coast Conference
- Record: 19–8 (5–1 ACC)
- Head coach: John Rittman (1st season)
- Assistant coaches: Kyle Jamieson; Courtney Breault
- Home stadium: Clemson Softball Stadium

2020 Atlantic Coast Conference softball standings
	Conf.				Overall
Team	W		L	PCT	W		L	PCT
No. 17 Virginia Tech ‍‍‍	3	–	0	1.000	21	–	4	.840
NC State ‍‍‍	3	–	0	1.000	19	–	6	.760
Clemson ‍‍‍	5	–	1	.833	19	–	8	.704
Georgia Tech ‍‍‍	2	–	1	.667	12	–	11	.522
Syracuse ‍‍‍	2	–	1	.667	10	–	10	.500
North Carolina ‍‍‍	3	–	3	.500	10	–	14	.417
Notre Dame ‍‍‍	2	–	4	.333	13	–	9	.591
Pittsburgh ‍‍‍	2	–	4	.333	8	–	12	.400
Duke ‍‍‍	1	–	2	.333	23	–	4	.852
Boston College ‍‍‍	1	–	2	.333	9	–	12	.429
No. 12 Florida State ‍‍‍	0	–	0	–	17	–	7	.708
Louisville ‍‍‍	0	–	0	–	10	–	13	.435
Virginia ‍‍‍	0	–	6	.000	10	–	12	.455
† – Conference champion ‡ – Tournament champion y – Invited to the NCAA tournament As of March 13, 2020; Rankings from NFCA

The 2020 Clemson Tigers softball team was the varsity college softball team that represented Clemson University during the 2020 NCAA Division I softball season. This was the first season of Clemson's softball program. The Tigers competed in the Atlantic Coast Conference (ACC) and were led by head coach John Rittman. Clemson played its home games at Clemson Softball Stadium in Clemson, South Carolina.

The season was impacted by the coronavirus pandemic. On March 12, it was announced that the 2020 NCAA tournament would be canceled due to the pandemic. Clemson University suspended all events until April 5, 2020. On March 17, the ACC cancelled all spring athletic activities and thereby ended the softball season. The Tigers finished the season 19–8 and 5–1 in ACC play.

== Personnel ==
=== Roster ===
2020 Clemson Tigers roster
Pitchers: 10 - Emma Whitfield - Freshman; 34 - Logan Caymol - (redshirt) Freshman; 72 - Valerie Cagle - Freshman	Catchers: 13 - Abi Stuart - Freshman; 23 - Jojo Hyatt - (redshirt) Freshman; Outfielders: 6 - Carlee Shannon - (redshirt) Freshman; 16 - Alia Logoleo - Freshman; 42 - Morgan Johnson - Freshman; 27 - Grace Mattimore - Junior	Infielders: 8 - Ansley Gilstrap - (redshirt) Senior; 12 - Cammy Pereira - (redshirt) Junior; 15 - Madison May - Freshman; 18 - Bailey Taylor - Junior; 24 - Arielle Oda - (redshirt) Freshman; 25 - Marissa Guimbarda - Junior; 28 - MK Bonamy - (redshirt) Senior; 58 - Kyah Keller - Freshman; 77 - Hannah Goodwin - Freshman

=== Coaches ===
2020 Clemson Tigers softball coaching staff
- John Rittman – Head coach – 1st season
- Kyle Jamieson – Assistant coach – 1st season
- Courtney Breault – Assistant coach – 1st season
- Reese Jacobs – Volunteer assistant coach – 1st season

== Schedule ==
Legend
	Clemson win
	Clemson loss
	Cancellation
**Bold**	Clemson team member
*	Non-Conference game
†	Make-Up Game

2020 Clemson Tigers softball game log
Regular season

February
Date	Opponent	Site/stadium	Score	Win	Loss	Save	Attendance	Overall record	ACC record
Feb 7	vs St. John's*	UCF Softball Complex • Orlando, FL (UCF Black & Gold)	**W** 6–2	**Caymol** (1–0)	Brown (0–1)	None	277	1–0	0–0
Feb 7	vs Duke*	UCF Softball Complex • Orlando, FL (UCF Black & Gold)	**L** 0–11 (5)	Butler (1–0)	**Cagle** (0–1)	None	237	1–1	0–0
Feb 8	vs Indiana*	UCF Softball Complex • Orlando, FL (UCF Black & Gold)	**L** 4–5	Goodin (2–2)	**Cagle** (0–2)	None	288	1–2	0–0
Feb 8	at UCF*	UCF Softball Complex • Orlando, FL (UCF Black & Gold)	**L** 0–8 (5)	Vasquez (1–0)	**Caymol** (1–1)	None	477	1–3	0–0
Feb 9	vs St. John's*	UCF Softball Complex • Orlando, FL (UCF Black & Gold)	**W** 19–9	**Cagle** (1–2)	Brown (0–3)	None	374	2–3	0–0
Feb 12	Western Carolina*	Clemson Softball Stadium • Clemson, SC	**L** 0–2	Rice (1–0)	**Cagle** (1–3)	None	1,616	2–4	0–0
Feb 12	Western Carolina*	Clemson Softball Stadium • Clemson, SC	**W** 8–0 (5)	**Caymol** (2–1)	Liscio (0–1)	None	1,616	3–4	0–0
Feb 14	Maryland*	Clemson Softball Stadium • Clemson, SC (ACC–Big Ten Challenge)	**W** 5–1	**Cagle** (2–3)	Wyche (0–3)	None	1,616	4–4	0–0
Feb 15	Maryland*	Clemson Softball Stadium • Clemson, SC (ACC–Big Ten Challenge)	**W** 21–2 (5)	**Caymol** (3–1)	Schlotterbeck (0–3)	None	1,616	5–4	0–0
Feb 15	Michigan State*	Clemson Softball Stadium • Clemson, SC (ACC–Big Ten Challenge)	**W** 2–1	**Caymol** (4–1)	Ladd (0–5)	None	1,276	6–4	0–0
Feb 16	Michigan State*	Clemson Softball Stadium • Clemson, SC (ACC–Big Ten Challenge)	**W** 8–4	**Caymol** (5–1)	Walker (0–1)	None	1,616	7–4	0–0
Feb 18	at UNC Greensboro*	UNCG Softball Stadium • Greensboro, NC	**L** 2–3	Scott (4–2)	**Cagle** (2–4)	None	262	7–5	0–0
Feb 21	vs Villanova*	Diamond 9 • Kissimmee, FL	**L** 1–2	Rauch (6–0)	**Cagle** (2–5)	None	150	7–6	0–0
Feb 21	vs Troy*	Diamond 9 • Kissimmee, FL	**W** 10–1 (5)	**Cagle** (3–5)	Johnson (4–2)	None	200	8–6	0–0
Feb 22	vs Oakland*	Diamond 9 • Kissimmee, FL	**L** 2–4	Campbell (3–0	**Cagle** (3–6)	None	250	8–7	0–0
Feb 22	vs Stetson*	Diamond 9 • Kissimmee, FL	**W** 8–6 (8)	**Cagle** (4–6)	Temples (5–2)	None	200	9–7	0–0
Feb 23	vs Morgan State*	Diamond 9 • Kissimmee, FL	**W** 6–3	**Cagle** (5–6)	Rundlett (1–5)	None	200	10–7	0–0
Feb 26	No. 14 Georgia*	Clemson Softball Stadium • Clemson, SC	**W** 4–1	**Cagle** (6–6)	Avant (6–3)	None	1,616	11–7	0–0
Feb 28	Virginia	Clemson Softball Stadium • Clemson, SC	**W** 8–7	**Whitfield** (1–0)	Grube (1–3)	None	1,616	12–7	1–0
Feb 29	Virginia	Clemson Softball Stadium • Clemson, SC	**W** 8–4	**Caymol** (6–1)	Grube (1–4)	None	1,616	13–7	2–0

March
Date	Opponent	Site/stadium	Score	Win	Loss	Save	Attendance	Overall record	ACC record
Mar 1	Virginia	Clemson Softball Stadium • Clemson, SC	**W** 12–3 (6)	**Cagle** (7–6)	Grube (1–5)	None	1,616	14–7	3–0
Mar 4	Charlotte*	Clemson Softball Stadium • Clemson, SC	**W** 5–2	**Caymol** (7–1)	Wright (3–3)	None	1,282	15–7	3–0
Mar 4	Charlotte*	Clemson Softball Stadium • Clemson, SC	**W** 11–2 (5)	**Whitfield** (2–0)	Hughes (2–3)	None	1,395	16–7	3–0
Mar 6	Pittsburgh	Clemson Softball Stadium • Clemson, SC	**W** 9–1 (5)	**Cagle** (8–6)	Miller (0–6)	None	1,525	17–7	4–0
Mar 7	Pittsburgh	Clemson Softball Stadium • Clemson, SC	**W** 7–2	**Whitfield** (3–0)	Knight (5–5)	**Cagle** (1)	1,616	18–7	5–0
Mar 8	Pittsburgh	Clemson Softball Stadium • Clemson, SC	**L** 2–8	Knight (6–5)	**Caymol** (7–2)	None	1,616	18–8	5–1
Mar 10	Presbyterian*	Clemson Softball Stadium • Clemson, SC	**W** 5–0	**Cagle** (9–6)	Greene (13–2)	None	1,596	19–8	5–1
Mar 13	at Georgia Tech	Shirley Clements Mewborn Field • Atlanta, GA	cancelled						
Mar 14	at Georgia Tech	Shirley Clements Mewborn Field • Atlanta, GA	cancelled						
Mar 15	at Georgia Tech	Shirley Clements Mewborn Field • Atlanta, GA	cancelled						
Mar 18	Georgia State*	Clemson Softball Stadium • Clemson, SC	cancelled						
Mar 20	at NC State	Curtis & Jacqueline Dail Softball Stadium • Raleigh, NC	cancelled						
Mar 21	at NC State	Curtis & Jacqueline Dail Softball Stadium • Raleigh, NC	cancelled						
Mar 22	at NC State	Curtis & Jacqueline Dail Softball Stadium • Raleigh, NC	cancelled						
Mar 25	South Carolina State*	Clemson Softball Stadium • Clemson, SC	cancelled						
Mar 25	South Carolina State*	Clemson Softball Stadium • Clemson, SC	cancelled						
Mar 27	Syracuse	Clemson Softball Stadium • Clemson, SC	cancelled						
Mar 28	Syracuse	Clemson Softball Stadium • Clemson, SC	cancelled						
Mar 29	Syracuse	Clemson Softball Stadium • Clemson, SC	cancelled						
Mar 31	at Kennesaw State*	Bailey Softball Complex • Kennesaw, GA	cancelled						

April
Date	Opponent	Site/stadium	Score	Win	Loss	Save	Attendance	Overall record	ACC record
Apr 3	at Virginia Tech	Tech Softball Park • Blacksburg, VA	cancelled						
Apr 4	at Virginia Tech	Tech Softball Park • Blacksburg, VA	cancelled						
Apr 5	at Virginia Tech	Tech Softball Park • Blacksburg, VA	cancelled						
Apr 7	at South Carolina*	Beckham Field • Columbia, SC	cancelled						
Apr 10	Louisiana Tech*	Clemson Softball Stadium • Clemson, SC	cancelled						
Apr 11	Louisiana Tech*	Clemson Softball Stadium • Clemson, SC	cancelled						
Apr 15	Winthrop*	Clemson Softball Stadium • Clemson, SC	cancelled						
Apr 17	Florida State	Clemson Softball Stadium • Clemson, SC	cancelled						
Apr 18	Florida State	Clemson Softball Stadium • Clemson, SC	cancelled						
Apr 19	Florida State	Clemson Softball Stadium • Clemson, SC	cancelled						
Apr 24	at Boston College	Boston College Softball Field at Harrington Athletics Village • Brighton, MA	cancelled						
Apr 25	at Boston College	Boston College Softball Field at Harrington Athletics Village • Brighton, MA	cancelled						
Apr 26	at Boston College	Boston College Softball Field at Harrington Athletics Village • Brighton, MA	cancelled						

Postseason

ACC tournament
Date	Opponent	Site/stadium	Score	Win	Loss	Save	Attendance	Overall record	Tournament record
May 6	TBD	Ulmer Stadium • Louisville, KY	cancelled						
