= List of NCAA Division I non-football programs =

This is a list of NCAA Division I non-football programs – colleges and universities that are members of Division I of the National Collegiate Athletic Association but do not sponsor varsity football teams. There are 99 D–I non-football members as of the 2026–27 athletic year. Before 2006, these schools were officially designated as Division I–AAA. This list includes schools in the process of transitioning to Division I, but are not yet full D–I members. Some have had football teams in the past ( ✓); some never have ( ✗).

Five Division I schools compete in sprint football, a variant governed separately from the NCAA that uses NCAA playing rules, but limits player weights to 178 pounds (81 kg). Four of them also field full-sized football teams; the only one that does not is Bellarmine, which is thus still considered "non-football" by the NCAA.

Institution	Nickname	City	State	Founded	Type	Enrollment	Current Conference	Football History	Ref.
American	Eagles	Washington	District of Columbia	1893	Private	10,676	Patriot League	✓	
Bellarmine	Knights	Louisville	Kentucky	1950	Private	3,750	Atlantic Sun Conference	✗ (Note: Bellarmine added sprint football in the 2022–23 school year.)	
Belmont	Bruins	Nashville	Tennessee	1890	Private	6,647	Missouri Valley Conference	✗	
Binghamton	Bearcats	Binghamton (Note: The BU campus has a Binghamton mailing address, but the core of the campus and almost all athletic facilities are in the adjacent town of Vestal.)	New York	1946	Public	18,746	America East Conference	✗	
Boston University	Terriers	Boston	Massachusetts	1839	Private	29,978	Patriot League	✓	
Bradley	Braves	Peoria	Illinois	1897	Private	6,700	Missouri Valley Conference	✓	
Cal State Bakersfield	Roadrunners	Bakersfield	California	1965	Public	8,111	Big West Conference	✗	
Cal State Fullerton	Titans	Fullerton	California	1957	Public	37,677	Big West Conference	✓	
Cal State Northridge	Matadors	Northridge	California	1958	Public	36,070	Big West Conference	✓	
California Baptist	Lancers	Riverside	California	1950	Private	10,486	Big West	✓	
Canisius	Golden Griffins	Buffalo	New York	1870	Private	5,152	Metro Conference	✓	
Charleston	Cougars	Charleston	South Carolina	1770	Public	11,220	Coastal Athletic Association	✓	
Cleveland State	Vikings	Cleveland	Ohio	1923	Public	17,204	Horizon League	✗	
Coppin State	Eagles	Baltimore	Maryland	1900	Public	2,348	Mid-Eastern Athletic Conference	✗	
Creighton	Bluejays	Omaha	Nebraska	1878	Private	7,730	Big East Conference	✓	
Denver	Pioneers	Denver	Colorado	1864	Private	11,476	West Coast Conference	✓	
DePaul	Blue Demons	Chicago	Illinois	1898	Private	22,966	Big East Conference	✓	
Detroit Mercy	Titans	Detroit	Michigan	1877	Private	5,231	Horizon League	✓	
Drexel	Dragons	Philadelphia	Pennsylvania	1891	Private	25,500	Coastal Athletic Association	✓	
Evansville	Purple Aces	Evansville	Indiana	1854	Private	3,050	Missouri Valley Conference	✓	
Fairfield	Stags	Fairfield	Connecticut	1942	Private	4,991	Metro Conference (CAA in 2027)	✓	
Fairleigh Dickinson	Knights	Teaneck	New Jersey	1942	Private	11,000	NEC	✗	
Florida Gulf Coast	Eagles	Fort Myers (Note: The FGCU campus has a Fort Myers mailing address, but is physically in unincorporated Lee County.)	Florida	1991	Public	12,683	Atlantic Sun Conference	✗	
George Mason	Patriots	Fairfax (Note: The main George Mason campus has a Fairfax mailing address, but is located in unincorporated Fairfax County and designated by the U.S. Census Bureau as George Mason, Virginia.)	Virginia	1957	Public	33,320	Atlantic 10 Conference	✗	
George Washington	Revolutionaries	Washington	District of Columbia	1821	Private	24,531	Atlantic 10 Conference	✓	
Gonzaga	Bulldogs/Zags	Spokane	Washington	1887	Private	7,764	Pac-12 Conference	✓	
Grand Canyon	Antelopes	Phoenix	Arizona	1949	Private	25,300 (on campus)/103,000+	Mountain West Conference	✗	
Green Bay	Phoenix	Green Bay	Wisconsin	1965	Public	7,000	Horizon League	✗	
High Point	Panthers	High Point	North Carolina	1924	Private	5,860	Big South Conference	✓	
Hofstra	Pride	Hempstead	New York	1935	Private	12,400	Coastal Athletic Association	✓	
IU Indy (Note: In 2024, the Indiana University and Purdue University systems dissolved IUPUI, replacing it with separate IU- and Purdue-affiliated institutions. The athletic program transferred to the new IU Indianapolis with a primary branding as IU Indy.)	Jaguars	Indianapolis	Indiana	1911/1946/1969	Public	22,534	Horizon League	✗	
Iona	Gaels	New Rochelle	New York	1940	Private	4,648	Metro Conference	✓	
Jacksonville	Dolphins	Jacksonville	Florida	1934	Private	3,200	Atlantic Sun Conference	✓	
Kansas City (Note: The official university name is University of Missouri–Kansas City, most commonly branded as UMKC; however, the athletic program has been known as "Kansas City" since 2019–20.)	Roos	Kansas City	Missouri	1933	Public	16,019	The Summit League	✗	
La Salle	Explorers	Philadelphia	Pennsylvania	1863	Private	7,554	Atlantic 10 Conference	✓	
Le Moyne	Dolphins	Syracuse (Note: The Le Moyne campus has a Syracuse mailing address, but virtually all of the campus is in the adjacent town of DeWitt.)	New York	1946	Private	3,409	NEC	✗	
Lipscomb	Bisons	Nashville	Tennessee	1891	Private	4,278	Atlantic Sun Conference	✗	
Little Rock	Trojans	Little Rock	Arkansas	1927	Public	13,176	United Athletic Conference	✗ (Note: This school had a football team when a junior college, but has never had one since becoming a university.)	
Long Beach State	The Beach	Long Beach	California	1949	Public	36,279	Big West Conference	✓	
Longwood	Lancers	Farmville	Virginia	1839	Public	4,800	Big South Conference	✗	
Loyola Chicago	Ramblers	Chicago	Illinois	1870	Private	15,068	Atlantic 10 Conference	✓	
Loyola (Maryland)	Greyhounds	Baltimore	Maryland	1852	Private	5,080	Patriot League	✓	
Loyola Marymount	Lions	Los Angeles	California	1911/1923/1973	Private	9,369	West Coast Conference	✓	
LSU New Orleans	Privateers	New Orleans	Louisiana	1956	Public	8,000	Southland Conference	✗	
Manhattan	Jaspers	Riverdale	New York	1853	Private	3,500	Metro Conference	✓	
Marquette	Golden Eagles	Milwaukee	Wisconsin	1881	Private	12,002	Big East Conference	✓	
Maryland Eastern Shore	Hawks	Princess Anne (Note: The UMES campus has a Princess Anne mailing address, but lies in unincorporated Somerset County.)	Maryland	1886	Public	4,433	Mid-Eastern Athletic Conference	✓	
Milwaukee	Panthers	Milwaukee	Wisconsin	1885/1956	Public	30,502	Horizon League	✓	
Mount St. Mary's	Mountaineers	Emmitsburg (Note: The Mount St. Mary's campus has an Emmitsburg mailing address, but lies in unincorporated Frederick County.)	Maryland	1808	Private	2,100	Metro Conference	✓	
Niagara	Purple Eagles	Niagara University (Note: The Niagara campus is its own census-designated place and postal entity within the town of Lewiston.)	New York	1856	Private	4,200	Metro Conference	✓	
NJIT	Highlanders	Newark	New Jersey	1881	Public	9,944	America East Conference	✗	
North Florida	Ospreys	Jacksonville	Florida	1969	Public	16,372	Atlantic Sun Conference	✗	
Northeastern	Huskies	Boston	Massachusetts	1898	Private	20,768	Coastal Athletic Association	✓	
Northern Kentucky	Norse	Highland Heights	Kentucky	1968	Public	15,405	Horizon League	✗	
Oakland	Golden Grizzlies	Rochester (Note: The Oakland campus has a Rochester mailing address, but is split between the separate cities of Auburn Hills and Rochester Hills, with athletic facilities in both cities.)	Michigan	1957	Public	19,379	Horizon League	✗	
Omaha	Mavericks	Omaha	Nebraska	1908	Public	14,903	The Summit League	✓	
Oral Roberts	Golden Eagles	Tulsa	Oklahoma	1963	Private	3,335	The Summit League	✗	
Pacific	Tigers	Stockton	California	1851	Private	6,196	West Coast Conference	✓	
Pepperdine	Waves	Malibu (Note: The Pepperdine campus has a Malibu mailing address, but is physically outside the city limits in unincorporated Los Angeles County.)	California	1937	Private	7,768	West Coast Conference	✓	
Portland	Pilots	Portland	Oregon	1901	Private	3,537	West Coast Conference	✓	
Providence	Friars	Providence	Rhode Island	1917	Private	4,587	Big East Conference	✓	
Purdue Fort Wayne	Mastodons	Fort Wayne	Indiana	1964/2018 (Note: Purdue Fort Wayne (PFW) was founded in 2018 when Indiana University and Purdue University dissolved Indiana University – Purdue University Fort Wayne (IPFW), a joint campus of the two systems that had been established in 1964. With more than 90% of the continuing enrollment of IPFW being inherited by PFW, the IPFW athletic program was transferred in its entirety to PFW.)	Public	10,208	Horizon League	✗	
Queens (NC)	Royals	Charlotte	North Carolina	1857	Private	2,463	Atlantic Sun Conference	✗	
Quinnipiac	Bobcats	Hamden	Connecticut	1929	Private	8,400	Metro Conference	✗	
Radford	Highlanders	Radford	Virginia	1910	Public	9,370	Big South Conference	✗	
Rider	Broncs	Lawrenceville	New Jersey	1865	Private	5,790	Metro Conference	✓	
St. Bonaventure	Bonnies	St. Bonaventure (Note: The U.S. Census Bureau classifies the St. Bonaventure campus as a census-designated place within the town of Allegany. The U.S. Postal Service treats the campus as its own entity.)	New York	1858	Private	2,400	Atlantic 10 Conference	✓	
St. John's	Red Storm	Jamaica (Note: The campus has a Queens mailing address.)	New York	1870	Private	21,354	Big East Conference	✓	
Saint Joseph's	Hawks	Philadelphia (Note: The Saint Joseph's campus straddles the boundary between Philadelphia and Lower Merion Township. Athletic facilities are in both communities. but the university administration and core of the undergraduate campus are in Philadelphia, and the entire campus has a Philadelphia mailing address.)	Pennsylvania	1851	Private	8,750	Atlantic 10 Conference	✓	
Saint Louis	Billikens	St. Louis	Missouri	1818	Private	13,785	Atlantic 10 Conference	✓	
Saint Mary's	Gaels	Moraga	California	1863	Private	4,228	West Coast Conference	✓	
Saint Peter's	Peacocks	Jersey City	New Jersey	1872	Private	2,987	Metro Conference	✓	
San Francisco	Dons	San Francisco	California	1855	Private	10,017	West Coast Conference	✓	
Santa Clara	Broncos	Santa Clara	California	1851	Private	8,519	West Coast Conference	✓	
Seattle	Redhawks	Seattle	Washington	1891	Private	7,755	West Coast Conference	✗	
Seton Hall	Pirates	South Orange	New Jersey	1856	Private	9,745	Big East Conference	✓	
Siena	Saints	Loudonville	New York	1937	Private	3,423	Metro Conference	✓	
SIU Edwardsville	Cougars	Edwardsville	Illinois	1957	Public	14,055	Ohio Valley Conference	✗	
South Carolina Upstate	Spartans	Spartanburg	South Carolina	1967	Public	5,495	Big South Conference	✗	
Southern Indiana	Screaming Eagles	Evansville (Note: The campus has an Evansville mailing address, but is located outside the city limits in Perry Township, a subdivision of Vanderburgh County.)	Indiana	1965	Public	9,758	Ohio Valley Conference	✗	
Texas A&M–Corpus Christi	Islanders	Corpus Christi	Texas	1947	Public	10,510	Southland Conference	✓	
UC Riverside	Highlanders	Riverside	California	1954	Public	21,005	Big West Conference	✓	
UC Irvine	Anteaters	Irvine	California	1965	Public	28,184	Big West Conference	✗	
UC San Diego	Tritons	La Jolla (Note: La Jolla is a separate postal entity within the city of San Diego.)	California	1960	Public	39,000	Big West Conference (WCC in 2027)	✓	
UC Santa Barbara	Gauchos	Santa Barbara (Note: The UCSB campus has a Santa Barbara mailing address, but is physically outside of the city limits in Isla Vista.)	California	1891	Public	21,927	Big West Conference (WCC in 2027)	✓	
UIC	Flames	Chicago	Illinois	1858/1965/1982	Public	28,091	Missouri Valley Conference	✓	
UMass Lowell	River Hawks	Lowell	Massachusetts	1894	Public	16,969	America East Conference	✓	
UMBC	Retrievers	Catonsville (Note: The campus has a Baltimore mailing address.)	Maryland	1966	Public	13,637	America East Conference	✗	
UNC Asheville	Bulldogs	Asheville	North Carolina	1927	Public	3,644	Big South Conference	✗	
UNC Greensboro	Spartans	Greensboro	North Carolina	1891	Public	18,502	Southern Conference	✗	
UNC Wilmington	Seahawks	Wilmington	North Carolina	1947	Public	14,071	Coastal Athletic Association	✗	
UT Arlington	Mavericks	Arlington	Texas	1895	Public	41,933	United Athletic Conference	✓	
Utah Valley	Wolverines	Orem	Utah	1941	Public	46,809	Big West Conference	✗	
Vermont	Catamounts	Burlington	Vermont	1791	Public	12,000	America East Conference	✓	
VCU	Rams	Richmond	Virginia	1838	Public	31,899	Atlantic 10 Conference	✗	
Wichita State	Shockers	Wichita	Kansas	1895	Public	14,806	American Conference	✓	
Winthrop	Eagles	Rock Hill	South Carolina	1886	Public	6,170	Big South Conference	✗	
Wright State	Raiders	Dayton (Note: The Wright State campus has a Dayton mailing address, but is physically well to the east of the city limits in Fairborn.)	Ohio	1967	Public	17,789	Horizon League	✗	
Xavier	Musketeers	Cincinnati	Ohio	1831	Private	6,650	Big East Conference	✓	
