= Otis Johnson (athlete) =

American athlete (born 1932)

Personal information
- Nickname: Jet
- Nationality: United States of America
- Born: February 3, 1932 (age 94) Philadelphia, Pennsylvania

Sport
- Country: United States
- Sport: Track and field Football
- Events: 60 yard dash Relay; Running back
- Team: Morgan State College (1951–1955); United States Army (1956–1960)

Otis "Jet" Johnson (born February 3, 1932) was an American athlete who competed mainly in sprint events. Running under coach Edward P. Hurt he was a key component of the Morgan State relay teams. From 1953 to 1955, he was the national outdoor champion and a three-time winner of the Penn Relays. Johnson later served in the U.S. Army. He was a member of The Flying Four American collegiate 4 × 400 metres relay team.
