= 2021 Mid-Eastern Athletic Conference softball tournament =

- Teams: 4
- Format: Double-elimination tournament
- Finals site: NSU Softball Field; Norfolk, Virginia
- Champions: Morgan State (1st title)
- Winning coach: Larry Hineline

The 2021 Mid-Eastern Athletic Conference softball tournament was held at the NSU Softball Field on the campus of the Norfolk State University in Norfolk, Virginia from May 13 through May 15, 2021. The tournament was won by the Morgan State Bears, who earned the Mid-Eastern Athletic Conference's automatic bid to the 2021 NCAA Division I softball tournament

== Tournament ==
=== Bracket ===
Thursday, May 13
S1	North Carolina A&T	3
N2	Norfolk State	17
Winner's bracket
S2	North Carolina Central	3
N1	Morgan State	4
S1	North Carolina A&T	3
S2	North Carolina Central	6
Loser's bracket

Friday, May 14
N2	Norfolk State	2
N1	Morgan State	3
S2	North Carolina Central	5
N2	Norfolk State	2

Saturday, May 15
N1	Morgan State	10	–
S2	North Carolina Central	5	–
