= Morgan State Lady Bears softball =

Collegiate softball team representing Morgan State University

- 2024 Morgan State Lady Bears softball team
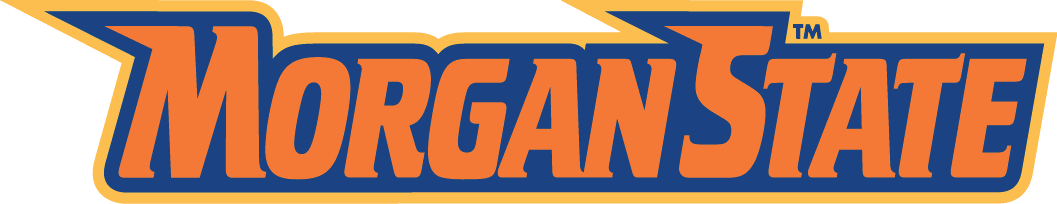
- University: Morgan State University
- Athletic director: Dena Freeman-Patton
- Conference: MEAC
- Location: Baltimore, Maryland, US
- Home stadium: Lois T. Murray Field
- Nickname: Lady Bears
- Colors: Blue and orange

NCAA Tournament appearances
- 2021, 2024

Conference tournament championships
- 2021, 2024

Regular-season conference championships
- 2021, 2022, 2023, 2024

The Morgan State Lady Bears softball team represents Morgan State University in NCAA Division I college softball. The team competes in the Mid-Eastern Athletic Conference. The Lady Bears are currently led by head coach Larry Hineline. The team plays its home games at Lois T. Murray Field located on the university's campus.

== History ==
The Lady Bears have been the regular season champions in the MEAC for four consecutive seasons from 2021 to 2024. They were also the conference tournament champions in 2021, which earned them a spot in the 2021 NCAA Division I softball tournament, where they lost to Oklahoma in the first round of the Norman Super Regional. The Bears defeated the Coppin State Eagles in the 2024 Mid-Eastern Athletic Conference Tournament championship, earning an automatic bid to the 2024 NCAA Division I softball tournament; where they will play the Duke Blue Devils.

== Results by season ==
=== Regular season ===
Season	Record	Place	Finish
2021	24–17 (14–5 in MEAC)	1st in North	MEAC champions
2022	31–15 (18–3 in MEAC)	1st in MEAC	MEAC champions
2023	24–21 (14–4 in MEAC)	1st in MEAC	MEAC champions
2024	35–18 (18–3 in MEAC)	1st in MEAC	MEAC champions

== Postseason ==
=== NCAA Division I Tournament results ===
The Bears have appeared in one NCAA Division I Tournament. Their combined record is 0–2. The Bears will make their second ever appearance in the tournament this season.

Year	Round	Opponent	Result
2021	First Round; First Round	(1) Oklahoma; Texas A&M	L, 0–19; L, 3–10
2024	First Round	(10) Duke	TBD
