= Josh Culbreath =

American hurdler (1932–2021)

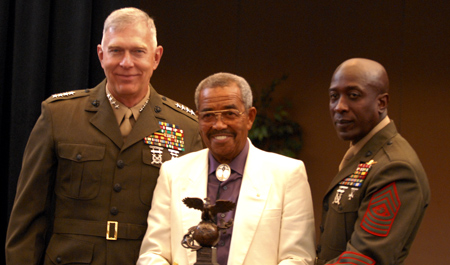
- Culbreath (center) with Gen. James T. Conway (left) and SgtMaj Carlton Kent (right) accepts his induction into the Marine Corps Sports Hall of Fame.

Personal information
- Full name: Joshua Culbreath
- Born: September 14, 1932 Norristown, Pennsylvania, U.S.
- Died: July 1, 2021 (aged 88) Cincinnati, Ohio, U.S.

Sport
- Country: United States
- Sport: Track and field
- Event: 400 m hurdles
- Team: Morgan State College (1952–1955); United States Marine Corps (1956–1958)
Medal record
Men's Athletics
Representing the United States
Olympic Games
Bronze medal – third place	1956 Melbourne	400 m hurdles
Pan American Games
Gold medal – first place	1955 Mexico City	400 m hurdles
Gold medal – first place	1959 Chicago	400 m hurdles

Joshua Culbreath (September 14, 1932 – July 1, 2021) was an American athlete who competed mainly in the 400 meter hurdles—the national outdoor champion from 1953 to 1955; three-time winner of the event in the Penn Relays in the same years, and Olympic bronze medal winner in 1956, while he was serving in the U.S. Marine Corps; and world record holder in 1957. Culbreath was inducted into the United States Marine Corps Sports Hall of Fame in 2008.

== Early life ==
Culbreath was born in Norristown, Pennsylvania, on September 14, 1932. He began running the hurdles in high school and in 1951 was ranked second in the U.S. in the 200 yard low hurdles and was Pennsylvania's state high school champion in that event.

Culbreath graduated in 1955 with a Bachelor of Arts in political science from Morgan State College, where he was the USA Outdoor champion in the 400m hurdles for three consecutive years—1953, 1954, and 1955. He was also a three-time winner of the event in the Penn Relays during the same years, the last time this has been accomplished. Culbreath later received a Master of Arts degree in education from Temple University.

== Career ==
Culbreath served in the United States Marine Corps from 1956 to 1958. During his time in the Marine Corps, he competed for the United States in the 1956 Summer Olympics held in Melbourne, Australia in the 400 metre hurdles where he won the bronze medal. He was a member of The Flying Four American collegiate 4 × 400 metres relay team. He also won several military and NATO track and field medals. He set the world records in the hurdles in 1956 and 1957—in the 300 yard Oval Grass Track, set in Bendigo, Australia in 1956 and in the 440 yard hurdles, set in Oslo, Norway in 1957.

Culbreath became the track and field coach at Central State University in 1988. He went on to coach his team to ten NAIA championships. Four of his athletes competed in the 1996 Summer Olympics in Atlanta, Georgia, including the 400m hurdles gold medalist, Deon Hemmings. After his time coaching at Central State, he became the athletic director at Morehouse College in Atlanta.

== Personal life ==
Culbreath had five children: Sandra, Khaliq, Maliq, Jahan and Camille. Jahan followed in his father's footsteps and became an All-American 400 m hurdler, as well as the coach at Central State. Khaliq predeceased Culbreath after being hit by a vehicle while cross-country cycling.

He made two guest appearances on The Cosby Show, playing the character Colonel Sanford B. "Tailwind" Turner, Cliff Huxtable's college track rival.

Culbreath died on July 1, 2021, under hospice care in Cincinnati, Ohio. He was 88, and suffered a period of declining health prior to his death.

== See also ==
- Edwin Moses, 1976 and 1984 American 400m hurdles Olympic gold medalist
