= 2015 Mid-Eastern Athletic Conference softball tournament =

American collegiate postseason softball tournament

The 2015 Mid-Eastern Athletic Conference (MEAC) softball tournament was held at Ormond Beach Sports Complex in Ormond Beach, Florida, from May 7 through May 9, 2015. The tournament winner will earn the MEAC's automatic bid to the 2015 NCAA Division I softball tournament. Stats will be available for all games, but no games will be streamed or televised.

== Tournament ==
Upper round 1	Upper round 2	Upper final	Final
1N	Delaware State	8
4S	North Carolina A&T	0^{(5)}
1N	Delaware State	0
2S	Bethune-Cookman	9^{(6)}
2S	Bethune-Cookman	8
3N	Hampton	0^{(5)}
2S	Bethune-Cookman	1
3S	Florida A&M	2
1S	Savannah State	10
4N	Howard	1^{(5)}
1S	Savannah State	3
3S	Florida A&M	9
2N	Norfolk State	1
3S	Florida A&M	6	3S	Florida A&M	0	2
2S	Bethune-Cookman	2	0
Lower round 1	Lower round 2	Lower round 3	Lower final
1S	Savannah State	8
3N	Hampton	10	4S	North Carolina A&T	0^{(6)}	2S	Bethune-Cookman	5
4N	Howard	2^{(5)}	1S	Savannah State	4	3N	Hampton	0
3N	Hampton	7
1N	Delaware State	4
2N	Norfolk State	2	3N	Hampton	7
4S	North Carolina A&T	4

- All times listed are Eastern Daylight Time.
