= The Flying Four =

Morgan State University 1951–1955 track relay team

Flying Foursome of Morgan State University
Personal information
- Full name: Flying Four of Morgan State University
- Nationality: United States of America

Sport
- Country: United States
- Sport: Track & Field
- Event: Relay Teams
- Team: Morgan State College (1951-1955)

The Flying Four Morgan State Track Relay Team 1951-1955, also known as "Flying Foursome" or the "Speed Merchants", was a track team of Morgan State University that was inducted into the CIAA Hall of Fame. The four members were James Rogers, Otis Johnson, Herman Wade and Joshua Culbreath.

== Coach ==
Edward "Eddie" P. Hurt became the head track coach at Morgan State College in 1929. When the CIAA conference still stood for Colored Intercollegiate Athletic Association, Coach Hurt reportedly said, "We had a heck of a problem getting started; there is no question about that." At that time, the small black colleges competed with one another and received little national attention. Hurt said, "It was hard to get recognition, especially in track & field, and we just never had a chance to compete against the better schools. When we first started trying to improve our program, nobody knew we were alive."

Coach Hurt started developing a premier program and by 1950 Morgan State's Track Team was drawing national and international attention due to the impressive showing at the Penn Relays. In 1950, The Historic Four (Sam LaBeach, Bob Tyler, Bill Brown and George Rhoden) broke a record at the Penn Relays that stood for 56 years. Many elite track athletes came to the school because of the popularity of its track team and coach Hurt. In 1975, he was the first African American coach to be inducted into the USA Track and Field Hall of Fame.

== Flying Four Track Team ==
In 1951, Coach Hurt recruited James Rogers, Otis "Jet" Johnson, Herman Wade and Joshua Culbreath. Sam Lacy dubbed the team "The Flying Four" and "The Speed Merchants". In 1953, the Flying Four went on to break the Central Intercollegiate Athletic Association (CIAA) Mile Relay mark set by their 1950 predecessors, Morgan's Historic Four, with a new time 3:11:3. During their 4 seasons, this foursome won 13 national championships, 26 major titles and 3 records. The Flying Four is the only team that ever won the national AAU Championship three years in a row with the same team members. This team set a new record each year in New York and won five relay titles at Penn Relays Championship of America. They won meets at Boston Garden, Madison Square Garden, Boston Athletic Association, Knights of Columbus, Millrose Games, New York Athletic Club Championship, the Baltimore Amateur Athletic games, the Philadelphia Inquirer Games and the Washington Evening Star Games.

They were inducted into the Morgan State University Athletic Hall of Fame in 1985 and the CIAA Athletic Hall of Fame in 2013.

== Achievements ==
- Won 13 National Championships
- Credited with 26 Major Titles
- Three-time 4 x 440 (Mile Relay) CIAA Relay Champions 1952, 1953 and 1955
- Two-time 440 yard CIAA Champions 1953 – 1955
- National 4 x 440 AAU Relay Champions 1955
- National AAU Indoor Mile Relay in 1954
- Two-time Mid-Atlantic 4 x 440 AAU Champions 1954 and 1955
- USA Team – European Tour 1953
- Dominated AAU National Indoor Championships for three consecutive years 1952, 1953 and 1955
- Dominated the Indoor One Mile Relay
- Went undefeated in winning seven (7) indoor meets a year for three years
- Averaged 3:18.0-2 for the mile relay – one of the fastest running times and ranked as one of the top five in the country
- Broke CIAA Indoor Record at 3:18.0 of the Morgan team who previously held the record at 3:19.0

== Hall of Fame Honors ==
- Morgan State University Athletic Hall of Fame in 1985
- CIAA Athletic Hall of Fame in 2013
