= Coppin State Eagles =

Intercollegiate sports teams of Coppin State University

- University: Coppin State University
- Conference: MEAC (primary); NEC (baseball)
- NCAA: Division I
- Athletic director: Derek Carter
- Location: Baltimore, Maryland
- Varsity teams: 14
- Basketball arena: Physical Education Complex
- Baseball stadium: Joe Cannon Stadium
- Nickname: Eagles
- Colors: Blue and gold
- Website: coppinstatesports.com

The Coppin State Eagles represent Coppin State University, a historically African-American institution in Baltimore, in NCAA Division I sports as members of the Mid-Eastern Athletic Conference. The Gold and Blue are represented by fourteen (14) teams, including men's and women's basketball, men's and women's cross country, men's and women's tennis, women's bowling, softball, volleyball, baseball, and both women's and men's indoor and outdoor track and field. They do not have a football team.

== Teams ==
| Men's sports | Women's sports |
|---|---|
| Baseball | Basketball |
| Basketball | Bowling |
| Cross Country | Cross Country |
| Tennis | Softball |
| Track and field^{†} | Tennis |
| | Track and field^{†} |
| | Volleyball |
† – Track and field includes both indoor and outdoor.
