= List of college swimming and diving teams =

This is a list of college swimming and diving teams that compete in the NCAA or NAIA men's and/or women's swimming and diving championships.

== NCAA Division I ==
Institution	Team name	Nickname	Diving	Men's conference	Women's conference	State
American University	American	Eagles	✓	Patriot	Patriot	DC
Arizona State University	Arizona State	Sun Devils	✓	Big 12	Big 12	AZ
Auburn University	Auburn	Tigers	✓	SEC	SEC	AL
Ball State University	Ball State	Cardinals	✓	MVC	MAC	IN
Bellarmine University	Bellarmine	Knights	✗	ASUN	ASUN	KY
Binghamton University	Binghamton	Bearcats	✓	AmEast	AmEast	NY
Boston College	Boston College	Eagles	✓	ACC	ACC	MA
Boston University	Boston University	Terriers	✓	Patriot	Patriot	MA
Bowling Green State University	Bowling Green	Falcons	✓	✗	MAC	OH
Brigham Young University	BYU	Cougars	✓	Big 12	Big 12	UT
Brown University	Brown	Bears	✓	Ivy	Ivy	RI
Bryant University	Bryant	Bulldogs	✓	AmEast	AmEast	RI
Bucknell University	Bucknell	Bison	✓	Patriot	Patriot	PA
Butler University	Butler	Bulldogs	✗	✗	Big East	IN
California Baptist University	Cal Baptist	Lancers	✓	✗	Pac-12	CA
California State University, Bakersfield	Bakersfield (Note: The school rebranded its athletic program as Bakersfield, but its conference uses CSU Bakersfield, and national media use Cal State Bakersfield.)	Roadrunners	✓	MPSF	MPSF	CA
California State University, Fresno	Fresno State	Bulldogs	✓	✗	Pac-12	CA
Campbell University	Campbell	Camels	✗	✗	CAA	NC
Canisius University	Canisius	Griffins	✓	Metro	Metro	NY
Central Connecticut State University	Central Connecticut	Blue Devils	✓	✗	NEC	CT
Cleveland State University	Cleveland State	Vikings	✓	Horizon	Horizon	OH
Colgate University	Colgate	Raiders	✓	Patriot	Patriot	NY
College of the Holy Cross	Holy Cross	Crusaders	✓	Patriot	Patriot	MA
College of William & Mary	William & Mary	Tribe	✗	CAA	CAA	VA
Colorado State University	Colorado State	Rams	✓	✗	Pac-12	CO
Columbia University	Columbia	Lions	✓	Ivy	Ivy	NY
Cornell University	Cornell	Big Red	✓	Ivy	Ivy	NY
Dartmouth College	Dartmouth	Big Green	✓	Ivy	Ivy	NH
Davidson College	Davidson	Wildcats	✓	A10	A10	NC
Drexel University	Drexel	Dragons	✓	CAA	CAA	PA
Duke University	Duke	Blue Devils	✓	ACC	ACC	NC
Duquesne University	Duquesne	Dukes	✓	✗	A10	PA
East Carolina University	East Carolina	Pirates	✓	✗	American	NC
Eastern Illinois University	Eastern Illinois	Panthers	✗	Summit	Summit	IL
Eastern Michigan University	Eastern Michigan	Eagles	✓	✗	MAC	MI
Fairfield University	Fairfield	Stags	✓	Metro	Metro	CT
Florida Atlantic University	Florida Atlantic (Note: Alternately FAU.)	Owls	✓	ASUN	American	FL
Florida Gulf Coast University	FGCU	Eagles	✓	✗	ASUN	FL
Florida International University	FIU	Panthers	✓	✗	American	FL
Florida State University	Florida State	Seminoles	✓	ACC	ACC	FL
Fordham University	Fordham	Rams	✓	A10	A10	NY
Gardner–Webb University	Gardner–Webb	Bulldogs	✗	ASUN	ASUN	NC
George Mason University	George Mason	Patriots	✓	A10	A10	VA
George Washington University	George Washington	Revolutionaries	✓	A10	A10	DC
Georgetown University	Georgetown	Hoyas	✓	Big East	Big East	DC
Georgia Institute of Technology	Georgia Tech	Yellow Jackets	✓	ACC	ACC	GA
Georgia Southern University	Georgia Southern	Eagles	✓	✗	ASUN	GA
Grand Canyon University	Grand Canyon	Antelopes	✓	MW	MW	AZ
Harvard University	Harvard	Crimson	✓	Ivy	Ivy	MA
Howard University	Howard	Bison	✓	NEC	NEC	DC
Illinois State University	Illinois State	Redbirds	✓	✗	MVC	IL
Indiana State University	Indiana State	Sycamores	✓	✗	MVC	IN
Indiana University Bloomington	Indiana	Hoosiers	✓	Big Ten	Big Ten	IN
Indiana University Indianapolis	IU Indy	Jaguars	✓	Horizon	Horizon	IN
Iona University	Iona	Gaels	✓	Metro	Metro	NY
Iowa State University	Iowa State	Cyclones	✓	✗	Big 12	IA
James Madison University	James Madison	Dukes	✓	✗	American	VA
La Salle University	La Salle	Explorers	✓	A10	A10	PA
Lafayette College	Lafayette	Leopards	✓	Patriot	Patriot	PA
Le Moyne College	Le Moyne	Dolphins	✓	NEC	NEC	NY
Lehigh University	Lehigh	Mountain Hawks	✓	Patriot	Patriot	PA
Liberty University	Liberty	Flames/Lady Flames	✓	✗	American	VA
Long Island University	LIU	Sharks	✓	NEC	NEC	NY
Louisiana State University	LSU	Tigers/Lady Tigers	✓	SEC	SEC	LA
Loyola University Maryland	Loyola (MD)	Greyhounds	✓	Patriot	Patriot	MD
Manhattan University	Manhattan	Jaspers	✓	Metro	Metro	NY
Marist University	Marist	Red Foxes	✓	Metro	Metro	NY
Marquette University	Marquette	Golden Eagles	✗	Big East	Big East	WI
Marshall University	Marshall	Thundering Herd	✓	✗	American	WV
Merrimack College	Merrimack	Warriors	✗	✗	Metro	MA
Miami University	Miami (OH)	RedHawks	✓	MVC	MAC	OH
Missouri State University	Missouri State	Bears/Lady Bears	✓	MVC	MVC	MO
Monmouth University	Monmouth	Hawks	✗	CAA	CAA	NJ
Mount St. Mary's University	Mount St. Mary's	Mountaineers (Note: Alternately "The Mount".)	✓	Metro	Metro	MD
New Jersey Institute of Technology	NJIT	Highlanders	✓	AmEast	✗	NJ
New Mexico State University	New Mexico State	Aggies	✓	✗	MPSF	NM
Niagara University	Niagara	Eagles	✗	Metro	Metro	NY
North Carolina State University	NC State	Wolfpack	✓	ACC	ACC	NC
Northeastern University	Northeastern	Huskies	✓	✗	CAA	MA
Northern Arizona University	Northern Arizona	Lumberjacks	✓	✗	MPSF	AZ
Northern Kentucky University	Northern Kentucky	Norse	✓	Horizon	Horizon	KY
Northwestern University	Northwestern	Wildcats	✓	Big Ten	Big Ten	IL
Oakland University	Oakland	Golden Grizzlies	✓	Horizon	Horizon	MI
Ohio University	Ohio	Ohio Bobcats	✓	✗	MAC	OH
Ohio State University	Ohio State	Buckeyes	✓	Big Ten	Big Ten	OH
Old Dominion University	Old Dominion	Monarchs	✓	ASUN	ASUN	VA
Pennsylvania State University	Penn State	Nittany Lions	✓	Big Ten	Big Ten	PA
Pepperdine University	Pepperdine	Waves	✓	✗	MPSF	CA
Princeton University	Princeton	Tigers	✓	Ivy	Ivy	NJ
Providence College	Providence	Friars	✓	Big East	Big East	RI
Purdue University	Purdue	Boilermakers	✓	Big Ten	Big Ten	IN
Queens University	Queens (Note: Because of the existence of Queens College, an NCAA Division II school in New York City, several other terms see use: National media typically use "Queens (NC)".; The school itself interchangeably uses "Queens University" and "QUC".)	Royals	✗	ASUN	ASUN	NC
Rice University	Rice	Owls	✓	✗	American	TX
Rider University	Rider	Broncs	✓	Metro	Metro	NJ
Rutgers University–New Brunswick	Rutgers	Scarlet Knights	✓	✗	Big Ten	NJ
Sacred Heart University	Sacred Heart	Pioneers	✓	✗	Metro	CT
St. Bonaventure University	St. Bonaventure	Bonnies	✓	A10	A10	NY
Saint Louis University	Saint Louis	Billikens	✓	A10	A10	MO
Saint Mary's College of California	Saint Mary's	Gaels	✗	MPSF	MPSF	CA
Saint Peter's University	Saint Peter's	Peacocks	✓	Metro	Metro	NJ
San Diego State University	San Diego State	Aztecs	✓	✗	Pac-12	CA
San Jose State University	San Jose State	Spartans	✓	✗	MW	CA
Seattle University	Seattle (Note: Alternately Seattle U.)	Redhawks	✗	MPSF	MPSF	WA
Seton Hall University	Seton Hall	Pirates	✓	Big East	Big East	NJ
Siena University	Siena	Saints	✓	✗	Metro	NY
South Dakota State University	South Dakota State	Jackrabbits	✓	Summit	Summit	SD
Southern Illinois University Carbondale	Southern Illinois	Salukis	✓	MVC	MVC	IL
Southern Methodist University	SMU	Mustangs	✓	ACC	ACC	TX
Stanford University	Stanford	Cardinal	✓	ACC	ACC	CA
Stonehill College	Stonehill	Skyhawks	✓	✗	NEC	MA
Stony Brook University	Stony Brook	Seawolves	✓	✗	CAA	NY
Texas A&M University	Texas A&M	Aggies	✓	SEC	SEC	TX
Texas Christian University	TCU	Horned Frogs	✓	Big 12	Big 12	TX
Towson University	Towson	Tigers	✓	CAA	CAA	MD
Tulane University	Tulane	Green Wave	✓	✗	American	LA
U.S. Air Force Academy	Air Force	Falcons	✓	MW	MW	CO
U.S. Military Academy	Army (Note: Alternately Army West Point.)	Knights	✓	Patriot	Patriot	NY
U.S. Naval Academy	Navy	Midshipmen	✓	Patriot	Patriot	MD
University at Buffalo, The State University of New York	Buffalo	Bulls	✓	✗	MAC	NY
University of Akron	Akron	Zips	✓	✗	MAC	OH
University of Alabama	Alabama	Crimson Tide	✓	SEC	SEC	AL
University of Arizona	Arizona	Wildcats	✓	Big 12	Big 12	AZ
University of Arkansas	Arkansas	Razorbacks	✓	✗	SEC	AR
University of Arkansas at Little Rock	Little Rock	Trojans	✓	✗	ASUN	AR
University of California, Berkeley	California	Golden Bears	✓	ACC	ACC	CA
University of California, Davis	UC Davis	Aggies	✓	✗	MW	CA
University of California, Los Angeles	UCLA	Bruins	✓	✗	Big Ten	CA
University of California, San Diego	UC San Diego (Note: Alternately UCSD.)	Tritons	✗	MPSF	MPSF	CA
University of California, Santa Barbara	UC Santa Barbara	Gauchos	✗	MPSF	MPSF	CA
University of Cincinnati	Cincinnati	Bearcats	✓	Big 12	Big 12	OH
University of Connecticut	UConn	Huskies	✓	✗	Big East	CT
University of Delaware	Delaware	Fightin' Blue Hens	✓	ASUN	ASUN	DE
University of Denver	Denver	Pioneers	✓	MPSF	MPSF	CO
University of Evansville	Evansville	Purple Aces	✓	MVC	MVC	IN
University of Florida	Florida	Gators	✓	SEC	SEC	FL
University of Georgia	Georgia	Bulldogs	✓	SEC	SEC	GA
University of Hawaiʻi at Mānoa	Hawaii	Rainbow Warriors/Rainbow Wahine	✓	MW	MW	HI
University of Houston	Houston	Cougars	✓	✗	Big 12	TX
University of Idaho	Idaho	Vandals	✓	✗	MPSF	ID
University of Illinois Chicago	UIC	Flames	✓	MVC	MVC	IL
University of Illinois Urbana–Champaign	Illinois	Fighting Illini	✓	✗	Big Ten	IL
University of Iowa	Iowa	Hawkeyes	✓	✗	Big Ten	IA
University of Kansas	Kansas	Jayhawks	✓	✗	Big 12	KS
University of Kentucky	Kentucky	Wildcats	✓	SEC	SEC	KY
University of Louisville	Louisville	Cardinals	✓	ACC	ACC	KY
University of Maine	Maine	Black Bears	✓	AmEast	AmEast	ME
University of Maryland, Baltimore County	UMBC	Retrievers	✓	AmEast	AmEast	MD
University of Massachusetts Amherst	UMass	Minutemen/Minutewomen	✓	MVC	MAC	MA
University of Miami	Miami (FL)	Hurricanes	✓	ACC (Note: The University of Miami only participates in men's diving.)	ACC	FL
University of Michigan	Michigan	Wolverines	✓	Big Ten	Big Ten	MI
University of Minnesota	Minnesota	Golden Gophers	✓	Big Ten	Big Ten	MN
University of Missouri	Missouri	Tigers	✓	SEC	SEC	MO
University of Nebraska–Lincoln	Nebraska	Cornhuskers	✓	✗	Big Ten	NE
University of Nebraska Omaha	Omaha	Mavericks	✓	Summit	Summit	NE
University of New Hampshire	New Hampshire	Wildcats	✓	✗	AmEast	NH
University of New Mexico	New Mexico	Lobos	✓	✗	MW	NM
University of Nevada	Nevada	Wolf Pack	✓	✗	MW	NV
University of Nevada, Las Vegas	UNLV	Rebels	✓	MW	MW	NV
University of North Carolina at Asheville	UNC Asheville	Bulldogs	✓	✗	ASUN	NC
University of North Carolina at Chapel Hill	North Carolina	Tar Heels	✓	ACC	ACC	NC
University of North Carolina Wilmington	UNC Wilmington (Note: Alternately UNCW.)	Seahawks	✓	CAA	CAA	NC
University of North Florida	North Florida	Ospreys	✗	✗	ASUN	FL
University of North Texas	North Texas	Mean Green	✓	✗	American	TX
University of Northern Colorado	Northern Colorado	Bears	✓	✗	MPSF	CO
University of Northern Iowa	Northern Iowa	Panthers	✓	✗	MVC	IA
University of Notre Dame	Notre Dame	Fighting Irish	✓	ACC	ACC	IN
University of Pennsylvania	Penn	Quakers	✓	Ivy	Ivy	PA
University of Pittsburgh	Pittsburgh	Panthers	✓	ACC	ACC	PA
University of Rhode Island	Rhode Island	Rams	✓	✗	A10	RI
University of Richmond	Richmond	Spiders	✓	✗	A10	VA
University of St. Thomas	St. Thomas	Tommies	✓	Summit	Summit	MN
University of San Diego	San Diego	Toreros	✓	✗	MPSF	CA
University of South Carolina	South Carolina	Gamecocks	✓	SEC	SEC	SC
University of South Dakota	South Dakota	Coyotes	✓	Summit	Summit	SD
University of Southern California	USC	Trojans	✓	Big Ten	Big Ten	CA
University of Southern Indiana	Southern Indiana	Screaming Eagles	✓	Summit	Summit	IN
University of Tennessee	Tennessee	Volunteers	✓	SEC	SEC	TN
University of Texas at Austin	Texas	Longhorns	✓	SEC	SEC	TX
University of Texas Rio Grande Valley	UTRGV	Vaqueros	✓	✗	MPSF	TX
University of the Incarnate Word	Incarnate Word (Note: Alternately UIW.)	Cardinals	✓	MPSF	MPSF	TX
University of the Pacific	Pacific	Tigers	✓	MPSF	MPSF	CA
University of Toledo	Toledo	Rockets	✓	✗	MAC	OH
University of Utah	Utah	Utes	✓	Big 12	Big 12	UT
University of Vermont	Vermont	Catamounts	✓	✗	AmEast	VT
University of Virginia	Virginia	Cavaliers	✓	ACC	ACC	VA
University of Wisconsin–Green Bay	Green Bay	Phoenix	✓	Horizon	Horizon	WI
University of Wisconsin–Madison	Wisconsin	Badgers	✓	Big Ten	Big Ten	WI
University of Wisconsin–Milwaukee	Milwaukee	Panthers	✓	Horizon	Horizon	WI
University of Wyoming	Wyoming	Cowboys/Cowgirls	✓	MW	MW	WY
Utah Tech University	Utah Tech	Trailblazers	✗	✗	MPSF	UT
Valparaiso University	Valparaiso	Beacons	✗	MVC	MVC	IN
Vanderbilt University	Vanderbilt	Commodores	✗	✗	SEC	TN
Villanova University	Villanova	Wildcats	✓	Big East	Big East	PA
Virginia Military Institute	VMI	Keydets	✓	NEC	NEC	VA
Virginia Polytechnic Institute and State University	Virginia Tech	Hokies	✓	ACC	ACC	VA
Wagner College	Wagner	Seahawks	✓	NEC	NEC	NY
Washington State University	Washington State	Cougars	✗	✗	Pac-12	WA
West Virginia University	West Virginia	Mountaineers	✓	Big 12	Big 12	WV
Xavier University	Xavier	Musketeers	✗	Big East	Big East	OH
Yale University	Yale	Bulldogs	✓	Ivy	Ivy	CT
Youngstown State University	Youngstown State	Penguins	✓	Horizon	Horizon	OH

=== Schools transitioning to Division I ===
Institution	Team name	Nickname	Diving	Men's conference	Women's conference	State	Transition start	Active	Notes
University of West Florida	West Florida	Argonauts	✓	✗	ASUN	FL	2026–27	2029–30	

== NCAA Division II ==
Institution	Athletic team	Diving	Men	Women	St./Pr.
Adams State University	Grizzlies	✗	RMAC	RMAC	CO
Adelphi University	Panthers	✓	NE10	NE10	NY
Ashland University	Eagles	✓	G-MAC/MEC	G-MAC/MEC	OH
Assumption University	Greyhounds	✗	NE10	NE10	MA
Augustana University	Vikings	✗	GLIAC	NSIC	SD
Barton College	Bulldogs	✗	Carolinas	Carolinas	NC
Bentley University	Falcons	✓	NE10	NE10	MA
Biola University	Eagles	✓	PCSC	PCSC	CA
Bluefield State University	Big Blue	✗	Independent	Independent	WV
California State University, East Bay	Pioneers	✗	✗	PCSC	CA
Carson–Newman University	Eagles	✗	Carolinas	Carolinas	TN
Catawba College	Indians	✗	Carolinas	Carolinas	NC
Chowan University	Hawks	✗	Carolinas	Carolinas	NC
College of Staten Island	Dolphins	✓	NE10	NE10	NY
Colorado Mesa University	Mavericks	✓	RMAC	RMAC	CO
Colorado School of Mines	Orediggers	✗	RMAC	RMAC	CO
Colorado State University-Pueblo	ThunderWolves	✓	✗	RMAC	CO
Commonwealth University-Bloomsburg	Huskies	✗	PSAC	PSAC	PA
Commonwealth University-Lock Haven	Bald Eagles	✗	✗	PSAC	PA
Concordia University Irvine	Eagles	✓	PCSC	PCSC	CA
Concordia University St. Paul	Golden Bears	✓	✗	NSIC	MO
Converse University	Valkyries	✗	✗	Carolinas	SC
Davenport University	Panthers	✓	GLIAC	GLIAC	MI
Davis & Elkins College	Senators	✗	G-MAC/MEC	G-MAC/MEC	WV
Delta State University	Statesmen/Lady Statesmen	✓	NSISC	NSISC	MS
Drury University	Panthers	✓	GLVC	GLVC	MO
East Stroudsburg University	Warriors	✗	✗	PSAC	PA
Emmanuel University	Lions	✗	Carolinas	Carolinas	GA
Fairmont State University	Fighting Falcons	✗	G-MAC/MEC	G-MAC/MEC	WV
Ferrum College	Panthers	✗	Carolinas	Carolinas	VA
Florida Institute of Technology	Panthers	✗	SSC	SSC	FL
Florida Southern College	Moccasins	✗	SSC	SSC	FL
Fresno Pacific University	Sunbirds	✓	PCSC	PCSC	CA
Frostburg State University	Bobcats	✗	G-MAC/MEC	G-MAC/MEC	MD
Gannon University	Golden Knights	✓	PSAC	PSAC	PA
Grand Valley State University	Lakers	✓	GLIAC	GLIAC	MI
Henderson State University	Reddies	✗	NSISC	NSISC	AR
Hillsdale College	Chargers	✗	✗	G-MAC/MEC	MI
Indiana University of Pennsylvania	Crimson Hawks	✗	PSAC	PSAC	PA
King University	Tornadoes	✗	Carolinas	Carolinas	TN
Kutztown University	Golden Bears	✗	✗	PSAC	PA
Lees–McRae College	Bobcats	✗	Carolinas	Carolinas	NC
Lenoir–Rhyne University	Bears	✗	Carolinas	Carolinas	NC
Lewis University	Flyers	✗	GLVC	GLVC	IL
Lynn University	Fighting Knights	✗	SSC	SSC	FL
Malone University	Pioneers	✓	G-MAC/MEC	G-MAC/MEC	OH
Mars Hill University	Mountain Lions	✗	Carolinas	Carolinas	NC
Maryville University	Saints	✓	GLVC	GLVC	MO
McKendree University	Bearcats	✓	GLVC	GLVC	IL
Millersville University	Marauders	✗	✗	PSAC	PA
Minnesota State University Moorhead	Dragons	✗	✗	NSIC	MN
Minnesota State University, Mankato	Mavericks	✗	✗	NSIC	MN
Missouri University of Science and Technology	Miners	✗	GLVC	✗	MO
Northern Michigan University	Wildcats	✓	GLIAC	GLIAC	MI
Northern State University	Wolves	✗	✗	NSIC	SD
Nova Southeastern University	Sharks	✗	SSC	SSC	FL
Oklahoma Christian University	Eagles/Lady Eagles	✗	RMAC	RMAC	OK
Ouachita Baptist University	Tigers	✗	NSISC	NSISC	AR
Pace University	Setters	✓	NE10	NE10	NY
Pennsylvania Western University – California	Vulcans	✗	✗	PSAC	PA
Pennsylvania Western University – Clarion	Golden Eagles	✓	PSAC	PSAC	PA
Pennsylvania Western University – Edinboro	Fighting Scots	✗	PSAC	PSAC	PA
Quincy University	Hawks	✗	GLVC	GLVC	IL
Roberts Wesleyan University	Redhawks	✗	G-MAC/MEC	G-MAC/MEC	NY
Rollins College	Tars	✗	SSC	SSC	FL
Saginaw Valley State University	Cardinals	✓	GLIAC	GLIAC	MI
St. Cloud State University	Huskies	✓	GLIAC	NSIC	MN
Saint Leo University	Lions	✗	SSC	SSC	FL
Saint Michael's College	Purple Knights	✓	NE10	NE10	VT
Salem University	Tigers	✗	G-MAC/MEC	G-MAC/MEC	WV
Shippensburg University	Red Raiders	✗	PSAC	PSAC	PA
Simon Fraser University	Red Leafs	✗	RMAC	RMAC	BC
Southern Connecticut State University	Owls	✗	NE10	NE10	CT
Southwest Baptist University	Bearcats	✓	GLVC	GLVC	MO
Southwest Minnesota State University	Mustangs	✓	✗	NSIC	MN
Thomas More University	Thomas More Saints	✗	G-MAC/MEC	G-MAC/MEC	KY
Truman State University	Bulldogs	✗	GLVC	GLVC	MO
University of Alaska Fairbanks	Nanooks	✗	✗	PCSC	AK
University of Findlay	Oilers	✓	G-MAC/MEC	G-MAC/MEC	OH
University of Indianapolis	Greyhounds	✓	GLVC	GLVC	IN
University of Jamestown	Jimmies	✓	✗	NSIC	ND
University of Mary	Marauders	✓	✗	NSIC	ND
University of Missouri–St. Louis	Tritons	✗	GLVC	GLVC	MO
University of Nebraska at Kearney	Lopers	✓	✗	RMAC	NE
University of North Carolina at Pembroke	Braves	✗	✗	Carolinas	NC
University of Puerto Rico at Mayagüez	Tarzans	✗	Independent	Independent	PR
University of Sioux Falls	Cougars	✗	✗	NSIC	SD
University of Tampa	Spartans	✗	SSC	SSC	FL
University of Texas Permian Basin	Falcons	✗	RMAC	RMAC	TX
Walsh University	Cavaliers	✓	G-MAC/MEC	G-MAC/MEC	OH
Wayne State University	Warriors	✓	GLIAC	GLIAC	MI
West Chester University	Golden Rams	✓	PSAC	PSAC	PA
West Virginia Wesleyan College	Bobcats	✗	G-MAC/MEC	G-MAC/MEC	WV
Western Colorado University	Mountaineers	✓	✗	RMAC	CO
Wheeling University	Cardinals	✓	G-MAC/MEC	G-MAC/MEC	WV
William Jewell College	Cardinals	✗	GLVC	GLVC	MO
Wingate University	Bulldogs	✗	Carolinas	Carolinas	NC

=== Schools transitioning to Division II ===
Institution	Athletic team	Diving	Men	Women	State	Transition start	Active	Notes
Ferrum College	Panthers	✗	Carolinas	Carolinas	VA	2025–26	2027–28	(Note: Ferrum and Jamestown began the transition to Division II in the 2025–26 season.)
University of Jamestown	Jimmies	✓	✗	NSIC	ND	2025–26	2028–29	

== NCAA Division III ==
Institution	Athletic team	Diving	Men	Women	State
Albertus Magnus College	Albertus Magnus Falcons	✗	✗	GNAC	CT
Albion College	Albion Britons	✓	Michigan	Michigan	MI
Albright College	Albright Lions	✗	MAC	MAC	PA
Alfred State College	Alfred State Pioneers	✓	AMCC/E8	AMCC/E8	NY
Alfred University	Alfred Saxons	✓	AMCC/E8	AMCC/E8	NY
Allegheny College	Allegheny Gators	✓	Presidents'	Presidents'	PA
Alma College	Alma Scots	✓	Michigan	Michigan	MI
Amherst College	Amherst Mammoths	✓	NESCAC	NESCAC	MA
Anderson University	Anderson Ravens and Lady Ravens	✗	Heartland	Heartland	IN
Arcadia University	Arcadia Knights	✗	MAC	MAC	PA
Asbury University	Asbury Eagles	✗	LibArts	LibArts	KY
Augsburg University	Augsburg Auggies	✓	✗	Minnesota	MN
Augustana College (Illinois)	Augustana Vikings	✓	CCIW	CCIW	IL
Austin College	Austin Kangaroos	✓	SCAC	SCAC	TX
Azusa Pacific University	Cougars	✗	✗	SCIAC	CA
Babson College	Babson Beavers	✓	NEWMAC	NEWMAC	MA
Baldwin Wallace University	Baldwin Wallace Yellow Jackets	✓	Ohio	Ohio	OH
Bard College	Bard Raptors	✗	Liberty	Liberty	NY
Baruch College	Baruch Bearcats	✗	Metro/CUNYAC	Metro/CUNYAC	NY
Bates College	Bates Bobcats	✓	NESCAC	NESCAC	ME
Batten University	Batten Marlins	✗	ODAC	ODAC	VA
Beloit College	Beloit Buccaneers	✓	Midwest	Midwest	WI
Berry College	Berry Vikings	✓	SAA	SAA	GA
Bethany College (West Virginia)	Bethany Bison	✗	Presidents'	Presidents'	WV
Bluffton University	Bluffton Beavers	✗	Heartland	Heartland	OH
Bowdoin College	Bowdoin Polar Bears	✓	NESCAC	NESCAC	ME
Brandeis University	Brandeis Judges	✓	UAA	UAA	MA
Bridgewater College	Bridgewater Eagles	✗	ODAC	ODAC	VA
Bridgewater State University	Bridgewater State Bears	✓	Little East	Little East	MA
Brooklyn College	Brooklyn Bulldogs	✗	CUNYAC	CUNYAC	NY
Bryn Mawr College	Bryn Mawr Owls	✗	✗	Centennial	PA
Buffalo State University	Buff State Tigers	✓	SUNYAC	SUNYAC	NY
California Institute of Technology	Caltech Beavers	✓	SCIAC	SCIAC	CA
California Lutheran University	Cal Lutheran Kingsmen and Regals	✗	SCIAC	SCIAC	CA
Calvin University	Calvin Knights	✓	Michigan	Michigan	MI
Carleton College	Carleton Knights	✓	Minnesota	Minnesota	MN
Carnegie Mellon University	Carnegie Mellon Tartans	✓	UAA	UAA	PA
Carroll University	Carroll Pioneers	✗	CCIW	CCIW	WI
Carthage College	Carthage Firebirds	✓	CCIW	CCIW	WI
Case Western Reserve University	Case Spartans	✓	UAA	UAA	OH
The Catholic University of America	Catholic University Cardinals	✓	Landmark	Landmark	DC
Cedar Crest College	Cedar Crest Falcons	✗	✗	AEC	PA
Centenary College of Louisiana	Centenary Gentlemen and Ladies	✗	SCAC	SCAC	LA
Centre College	Centre Colonels	✓	SAA	SAA	KY
Chapman University	Chapman Panthers	✓	SCIAC	SCIAC	CA
Chatham University	Chatham Cougars	✓	Presidents'	Presidents'	PA
Claremont McKenna-Harvey Mudd- Scripps Colleges	CMS Stags and Athenas	✓	SCIAC	SCIAC	CA
Clark University	Clark Cougars	✓	NEWMAC	NEWMAC	MA
Clarkson University	Clarkson Golden Knights	✓	Liberty	Liberty	NY
Coe College	Coe Kohawks	✓	ARC	ARC	IA
Colby College	Colby Mules	✓	NESCAC	NESCAC	ME
Colby-Sawyer College	Colby-Sawyer Chargers	✗	GNAC	GNAC	NH
University of Mount Saint Vincent	Saint Vincent Dolphins	✗	Metro/Skyline	Metro/Skyline	NY
The College of New Jersey	TCNJ Lions	✓	NJAC	NJAC	NJ
College of Saint Benedict	Saint Benedict Bennies	✓	✗	Minnesota	MN
College of Wooster	Wooster Scots	✓	NCAC	NCAC	OH
Colorado College	Colorado College Tigers	✓	SCAC	SCAC	CO
Concordia College (Moorhead)	Concordia Cobbers	✓	✗	Minnesota	MN
Connecticut College	Connecticut College Camels	✗	NESCAC	NESCAC	CT
Denison University	Denison Big Red	✓	NCAC	NCAC	OH
DePauw University	DePauw Tigers	✓	NCAC	NCAC	IN
Dickinson College	Dickinson Red Devils	✗	Centennial	Centennial	PA
Drew University	Drew Rangers	✓	Landmark	Landmark	NJ
Eastern Connecticut State University	Eastern Connecticut State Warriors	✗	Little East	Little East	CT
Elizabethtown College	Elizabethtown Blue Jays	✗	Landmark	Landmark	PA
Elms College	Elms Blazers	✗	GNAC	GNAC	MA
Emory University	Emory Eagles	✓	UAA	UAA	GA
Fairleigh Dickinson University, Florham	FDU Florham Devils	✗	MAC	MAC	NJ
Franciscan University of Steubenville	Franciscan Barons	✗	✗	Presidents'	OH
Franklin College	Franklin Grizzlies	✓	Heartland	Heartland	IN
Franklin & Marshall College	Franklin & Marshall Diplomats	✗	Centennial	Centennial	PA
Gallaudet University	Gallaudet Bison	✗	AEC	AEC	DC
George Fox University	George Fox Bruins	✗	Northwest	Northwest	OR
Gettysburg College	Gettysburg Bullets	✗	Centennial	Centennial	PA
Gordon College	Gordon Fighting Scots	✗	NAC	NAC	MA
Goucher College	Goucher Gophers	✗	Landmark	Landmark	MD
Greensboro College	Greensboro Pride	✗	ODAC	ODAC	NC
Grinnell College	Grinnell Pioneers	✓	Midwest	Midwest	IA
Grove City College	Grove City Wolverines	✓	Presidents'	Presidents'	PA
Guilford College	Guilford Quakers	✗	✗	ODAC	NC
Gustavus Adolphus College	Gustavus Adolphus Gusties	✓	Minnesota	Minnesota	MN
Hamilton College	Hamilton Continentals	✓	NESCAC	NESCAC	NY
Hamline University	Hamline Pipers	✓	Minnesota	Minnesota	MN
Hampden-Sydney College	Hampden–Sydney Tigers	✗	ODAC	✗	VA
Hanover College	Hanover Panthers	✗	Heartland	Heartland	IN
Hartwick College	Hartwick Hawks	✓	AMCC/E8	AMCC/E8	NY
Hendrix College	Hendrix Warriors	✓	SCAC	SCAC	AR
Hiram College	Hiram Terriers	✗	PAC	PAC	OH
Hobart and William Smith Colleges	Hobart Statesmen / William Smith Herons	✓	Liberty	Liberty	NY
Hollins University	(none)	✗	✗	ODAC	VA
Hood College	Hood Blazers	✗	MAC	MAC	MD
Hope College	Hope Flying Dutchmen	✓	Michigan	Michigan	MI
Hunter College	Hunter Hawks	✗	✗	Metro/CUNYAC	NY
Husson University	Husson Eagles	✓	NAC	NAC	ME
Illinois College	Illinois College Blueboys and Lady Blues	✓	Midwest	Midwest	IL
Illinois Institute of Technology	Illinois Tech Scarlet Hawks	✓	LibArts	LibArts	IL
Illinois Wesleyan University	Illinois Wesleyan Titans	✓	CCIW	CCIW	IL
Immaculata University	Immaculata Mighty Macs	✗	AEC	AEC	PA
Ithaca College	Ithaca Bombers	✓	Liberty	Liberty	NY
John Carroll University	John Carroll Blue Streaks	✓	NCAC	NCAC	OH
John Jay College of Criminal Justice	John Jay Bloodhounds	✗	✗	CUNYAC	NY
Johns Hopkins University	Johns Hopkins Blue Jays	✗	Independent	Independent	MD
Juniata College	Juniata Eagles	✗	Landmark	Landmark	PA
Kalamazoo College	Kalamazoo Hornets	✓	Michigan	Michigan	MI
Kean University	Kean Cougars	✗	✗	NJAC	NJ
Keene State College	Keene State Owls	✓	Little East	Little East	NH
Kenyon College	Kenyon Owls	✓	NCAC	NCAC	OH
King's College (Pennsylvania)	King's Monarchs	✗	MAC	MAC	PA
Knox College	Knox Prairie Fire	✓	Midwest	Midwest	IL
Lake Forest College	Lake Forest Foresters	✓	Midwest	Midwest	IL
Lawrence University	Lawrence Vikings	✓	Midwest	Midwest	WI
Lebanon Valley College	Lebanon Valley Dutchmen	✗	MAC	MAC	PA
Lehman College	Lehman Lightning	✗	CUNYAC	CUNYAC	NY
Lewis & Clark College	Lewis & Clark Pioneers	✗	Northwest	Northwest	OR
Linfield University	Linfield Wildcats	✗	Northwest	Northwest	OR
Loras College	Loras Duhawks	✗	ARC	ARC	IA
Luther College	Luther Norse	✓	ARC	ARC	IA
Lycoming College	Lycoming Warriors	✗	Landmark	Landmark	PA
Macalester College	Macalester Scots	✓	Minnesota	Minnesota	MN
Maine Maritime Academy	Maine Maritime Mariners	✗	NAC	NAC	ME
Manchester University	Manchester Spartans	✓	Heartland	Heartland	IN
Marymount University	Marymount Saints	✗	AEC	AEC	VA
Marywood University	Marywood Pacers	✓	AEC	AEC	PA
Massachusetts Institute of Technology	MIT Engineers	✓	NEWMAC	NEWMAC	MA
McDaniel College	McDaniel Green Terror	✗	Centennial	Centennial	MD
McMurry University	McMurry War Hawks	✗	SCAC	SCAC	TX
Messiah University	Messiah Falcons	✗	MAC	MAC	PA
Middlebury College	Middlebury Panthers	✓	NESCAC	NESCAC	VT
Millikin University	Millikin Big Blue	✗	CCIW	CCIW	IL
Millsaps College	Millsaps Majors	✗	SAA	SAA	MS
Misericordia University	Misericordia Cougars	✗	MAC	MAC	PA
Monmouth College	Monmouth Fighting Scots	✗	Midwest	Midwest	IL
Montclair State University	Montclair State Red Hawks	✓	NJAC	NJAC	NJ
Mount Holyoke College	Mount Holyoke Lyons	✓	✗	NEWMAC	MA
Moravian University	Moravian Greyhounds	✗	Landmark	Landmark	PA
Mount Saint Mary College	Mount Saint Mary Knights	✗	Metro	Metro	NY
Nazareth University	Nazareth Golden Flyers	✓	AMCC/E8	AMCC/E8	NY
Nebraska Wesleyan University	Nebraska Wesleyan Prairie Wolves	✗	ARC	ARC	NE
New York University	NYU Violets	✓	UAA	UAA	NY
North Central College	North Central Cardinals	✗	CCIW	CCIW	IL
Norwich University	Norwich Cadets	✓	GNAC	GNAC	VT
Oberlin College	Oberlin Yeomen	✓	NCAC	NCAC	OH
Occidental College	Occidental Tigers	✓	SCIAC	SCIAC	CA
Ohio Northern University	Ohio Northern Polar Bears	✓	Ohio	Ohio	OH
Ohio Wesleyan University	Ohio Wesleyan Battling Bishops	✓	NCAC	NCAC	OH
University of Olivet	Olivet Comets	✓	Michigan	Michigan	MI
Pacific Lutheran University	Pacific Lutheran Lutes	✗	Northwest	Northwest	WA
Pacific University	Pacific Boxers	✗	Northwest	Northwest	OR
Penn State Erie, The Behrend College	Penn State Behrend Lions	✓	AMCC/E8	AMCC/E8	PA
Pfeiffer University	Pfeiffer Falcons	✗	✗	ISC	NC
Penn State University, Altoona	Penn State Altoona Nittany Lions	✗	AMCC/E8	AMCC/E8	PA
Piedmont University	Piedmont Lions	✗	ISC	ISC	GA
Plymouth State University	Plymouth State Panthers	✓	Little East	Little East	NH
Pomona-Pitzer Colleges	Pomona–Pitzer Sagehens	✓	SCIAC	SCIAC	CA
Principia College	Principia Panthers	✗	LibArts	LibArts	IL
Ramapo College	Ramapo Roadrunners	✗	NJAC	NJAC	NJ
Randolph College	Randolph WildCats	✗	ODAC	ODAC	VA
Randolph–Macon College	Randolph–Macon Yellow Jackets	✗	ODAC	ODAC	VA
Regis College	Regis Pride	✗	GNAC	GNAC	MA
Rensselaer Polytechnic Institute	RPI Engineers	✓	Liberty	Liberty	NY
Rhode Island College	Rhode Island College Anchormen	✗	✗	Little East	RI
Rhodes College	Rhodes Lynx	✓	SAA	SAA	TN
Ripon College	Ripon Red Hawks	✓	Midwest	Midwest	WI
Roanoke College	Roanoke Maroons	✗	ODAC	ODAC	VA
Rochester Institute of Technology	RIT Tigers	✓	Liberty	Liberty	NY
Roger Williams University	Roger Williams Hawks	✓	NJAC	NJAC	RI
Rose-Hulman Institute of Technology	Rose-Hulman Fightin' Engineers	✓	Heartland	Heartland	IN
Rowan University	Rowan Profs	✓	NJAC	NJAC	NJ
St. Catherine University	St. Catherine Wildcats	✓	✗	Minnesota	MN
Saint Francis University	Saint Francis Red Wolves	✓	✗	PAC	PA
Saint John's University (Minnesota)	Saint John's Johnnies	✓	Minnesota	✗	MN
St. Joseph's University (Long Island)	St. Joseph's-Long Island Golden Eagles	✗	✗	Skyline	NY
St. Joseph's College (Maine)	St. Joseph's Monks	✗	GNAC	GNAC	ME
St. Lawrence University	St. Lawrence Saints	✓	Liberty	Liberty	NY
St. Mary's College of Maryland	St. Mary's Seahawks	✗	AEC	AEC	MD
St. Norbert College	St. Norbert Green Knights	✓	Midwest	Midwest	WI
St. Olaf College	St. Olaf Oles	✓	Minnesota	Minnesota	MN
Saint Vincent College	Saint Vincent Bearcats	✗	Presidents'	Presidents'	PA
Salem College	Salem Spirits	✗	✗	ISC	NC
Salisbury University	Salisbury Sea Gulls	✗	NJAC	NJAC	MD
Sarah Lawrence College	Sarah Lawrence Gryphons	✗	✗	Metro/Skyline	NY
Sewanee: The University of the South	Sewanee Tigers	✓	SAA	SAA	TN
Simmons University	Simmons Sharks	✓	✗	GNAC	MA
Simpson College	Simpson Storm	✗	ARC	ARC	IA
Skidmore College	Skidmore Thoroughbreds	✗	Liberty	Liberty	NY
Smith College	Smith Pioneers	✓	✗	NEWMAC	MA
Southern Virginia University	Southern Virginia Knights	✗	ISC	ISC	VA
Southwestern University	Southwestern Pirates	✓	SAA	SAA	TX
Springfield College	Springfield Pride	✓	NEWMAC	NEWMAC	MA
State University of New York at Brockport	Brockport State Eagles	✓	E8	E8	NY
State University of New York at Cortland	Cortland Red Dragons	✓	SUNYAC	SUNYAC	NY
State University of New York at Delhi	SUNY Delhi Broncos	✗	NAC	NAC	NY
State University of New York at Fredonia	Fredonia Blue Devils	✓	SUNYAC	SUNYAC	NY
State University of New York at Geneseo	Geneseo Knights	✓	E8	E8	NY
State University of New York Maritime College	Maritime College Privateers	✓	Metro/Skyline	Metro/Skyline	NY
State University of New York at New Paltz	New Paltz Hawks	✗	SUNYAC	SUNYAC	NY
State University of New York at Oneonta	Oneonta State Red Dragons	✓	SUNYAC	SUNYAC	NY
State University of New York at Oswego	Oswego State Lakers	✓	SUNYAC	SUNYAC	NY
State University of New York at Potsdam	Potsdam State Bears	✓	SUNYAC	SUNYAC	NY
State University of New York at Purchase	Purchase College Panthers	✗	Skyline	Skyline	NY
Stevens Institute of Technology	Stevens Ducks	✗	MAC	MAC	NJ
Stevenson University	Stevenson Mustangs	✗	MAC	MAC	MD
Susquehanna University	Susquehanna River Hawks	✓	Landmark	Landmark	PA
Swarthmore College	Swarthmore Garnet	✗	Centennial	Centennial	PA
Sweet Briar College	Sweet Briar Vixens	✗	✗	ODAC	VA
Transylvania University	Transylvania Pioneers	✓	Heartland	Heartland	KY
Trinity College (Connecticut)	Trinity Bantams	✓	NESCAC	NESCAC	CT
Trinity University (Texas)	Trinity Tigers	✓	SAA	SAA	TX
Tufts University	Tufts Jumbos	✓	NESCAC	NESCAC	MA
United States Coast Guard Academy	Coast Guard Bears	✓	NEWMAC	NEWMAC	CT
United States Merchant Marine Academy	Merchant Marine Mariners	✓	NJAC/Skyline	NJAC/Skyline	NY
Union College	Union Garnet Chargers	✓	Liberty	Liberty	NY
University of California, Santa Cruz	UC Santa Cruz Banana Slugs	✓	PCSC	PCSC	CA
University of Chicago	Chicago Maroons	✓	UAA	UAA	IL
University of La Verne	ULV Leopards	✓	SCIAC	SCIAC	CA
University of Lynchburg	Lynchburg Hornets	✗	ODAC	ODAC	VA
University of Massachusetts Dartmouth	UMass Dartmouth Corsairs	✗	✗	Little East	MA
University of Mary Washington	Mary Washington Eagles	✓	NJAC	NJAC	VA
University of Minnesota Morris	Minnesota-Morris Cougars	✓	LibArts	LibArts	MN
University of Mount Union	Mount Union Purple Raiders	✓	Ohio	Ohio	OH
University of New England	New England Nor'easters	✗	✗	Little East	ME
University of the Ozarks	Ozarks Eagles	✗	SCAC	SCAC	AR
University of Pittsburgh at Bradford	Pitt-Bradford Panthers	✗	AMCC/E8	AMCC/E8	PA
University of Puget Sound	Puget Sound Loggers	✗	Northwest	Northwest	WA
University of Redlands	Redlands Bulldogs	✓	SCIAC	SCIAC	CA
University of Rochester	Rochester Yellowjackets	✓	UAA (Note: The University of Rochester has dual membership in both the University Athletic Association and Liberty League. However, Rochester only competes at the UAA conference championship.)	UAA	NY
University of Saint Joseph	Saint Joseph Blue Jays	✓	GNAC	GNAC	CT
University of Scranton	Scranton Royals	✓	Landmark	Landmark	PA
University of Wisconsin–Eau Claire	Wisconsin–Eau Claire Blugolds	✓	Wisconsin	Wisconsin	WI
University of Wisconsin–La Crosse	Wisconsin–La Crosse Eagles	✓	Wisconsin	Wisconsin	WI
University of Wisconsin–Oshkosh	Wisconsin–Oshkosh Titans	✓	Wisconsin	Wisconsin	WI
University of Wisconsin–Stevens Point	Wisconsin–Stevens Point Pointers	✓	Wisconsin	Wisconsin	WI
University of Wisconsin–Whitewater	Wisconsin–Whitewater Warhawks	✓	Wisconsin	Wisconsin	WI
Ursinus College	Ursinus Bears	✗	Centennial	Centennial	PA
Utica University	Utica Pioneers	✓	AMCC/E8	AMCC/E8	NY
Vassar College	Vassar Brewers	✓	Liberty	Liberty	NY
Wabash College	Wabash Little Giants	✓	NCAC	✗	IN
Washington & Jefferson College	Washington & Jefferson Presidents	✗	Presidents'	Presidents'	PA
Washington and Lee University	Washington and Lee Generals	✗	ODAC	ODAC	VA
Washington College (Maryland)	Washington College Shoremen	✗	Centennial	Centennial	MD
Washington University in St. Louis	Washington University Bears	✓	UAA	UAA	MO
Warren Wilson College	Warren Wilson Owls	✗	ISC	ISC	NC
Wellesley College	Wellesley Blue	✓	✗	NEWMAC	MA
Wells College	Wells Express	✗	AMCC/E8	AMCC/E8	NY
Wesleyan University (Connecticut)	Wesleyan Cardinals	✓	NESCAC	NESCAC	CT
Western Connecticut State University	Western Connecticut State Colonials	✓	Little East	Little East	CT
Western New England University	Western New England Bears	✗	✗	Little East	MA
Westfield State University	Westfield State Owls	✓	✗	Little East	MA
Westminster College (Pennsylvania)	Westminster Titans	✓	Presidents'	Presidents'	PA
Wheaton College (Illinois)	Wheaton Thunder	✗	CCIW	CCIW	IL
Wheaton College (Massachusetts)	Wheaton Lyons	✗	NEWMAC	NEWMAC	MA
Whitman College	Whitman Blues	✗	Northwest	Northwest	WA
Whittier College	Whittier Poets	✓	SCIAC	SCIAC	CA
Whitworth University	Whitworth Pirates	✗	Northwest	Northwest	WA
Widener University	Widener Pride	✗	MAC	MAC	PA
Wilkes University	Wilkes Colonels	✗	Landmark	Landmark	PA
Willamette University	Willamette Bearcats	✗	Northwest	Northwest	OR
William Paterson University	William Paterson Pioneers	✓	NJAC	NJAC	NJ
William Peace University	William Peace Pacers	✗	ISC	ISC	NC
Williams College	Williams Ephs	✓	NESCAC	NESCAC	MA
Wilmington College (Ohio)	Wilmington Quakers	✗	Ohio	Ohio	OH
Wittenberg University	Wittenberg Tigers	✗	NCAC	NCAC	OH
Worcester Polytechnic Institute	WPI Engineers	✓	NEWMAC	NEWMAC	MA
York College (New York)	York Cardinals	✗	CUNYAC	CUNYAC	NY
York College (Pennsylvania)	York Spartans	✗	MAC	MAC	PA

== NAIA ==
Institution	Athletic team	Diving	Men	Women	Conf.	St./Pr.
Arizona Christian University	Arizona Christian Firestorm	✗	✓	✓	PCSC	AZ
Bethel University (IN)	Bethel Pilots	✗	✓	✓	Independent	IN
Bethel University (TN)	Bethel Wildcats	✗	✓	✓	MSC	TN
Brenau University	Brenau Golden Tigers	✗	✗	✓	AAC	GA
Campbellsville University	Campbellsville Tigers	✗	✓	✓	MSC	KY
College of Idaho	Idaho Coyotes	✓	✓	✓	Independent	ID
College of Saint Mary (NE)	Saint Mary Flames	✗	✗	✓	LibArts	NE
Columbia College (SC)	Columbia Koalas	✗	✓	✓	AAC	SC
Indiana Wesleyan University	Indiana Wildcats	✗	✗	✓	MSC	IN
Keiser University	Keiser Seahawks	✗	✓	✓	SCSC	FL
Life University	Life Eagles	✗	✓	✓	MSC	GA
Lindsey Wilson University	Lindsey Wilson Blue Raiders	✗	✓	✓	MSC	KY
Loyola University New Orleans	Loyola Wolf Pack	✗	✓	✓	MSC	LA
The Master's University	Master's Mustangs	✓	✓	✓	PCSC	CA
Midland University	Midland Warriors	✓	✓	✓	KCAC	NE
Milligan University	Milligan Buffaloes	✗	✓	✓	AAC	TN
Morningside University	Morningside Mustangs	✗	✓	✓	LibArts	IA
Olivet Nazarene University	ONU Tigers	✓	✓	✓	KCAC	IL
St. Ambrose University (IA)	St. Ambrose Fighting Bees & Queen Bees	✓	✓	✓	Independent	IA
Savannah College of Art and Design	SCAD Bees	✗	✓	✓	Independent	GA
Simpson University	Simpson Red Hawks	✗	✓	✓	PCSC	CA
Soka University of America	SUA Lions	✗	✓	✓	PCSC	CA
Sterling College (KS)	Sterling Warriors	✗	✓	✓	KCAC	KS
Tabor College (KS)	Tabor Bluejays	✗	✓	✓	KCAC	KS
Thomas University	Thomas Night Hawks	✗	✓	✓	SCSC	GA
Union Commonwealth University	Union Bulldogs	✓	✓	✓	AAC	KY
University of British Columbia	UBC Thunderbirds	✗	✓	✓	Independent (Note: The University of British Columbia and University of Victoria hold concurrent memberships in U Sports and NAIA. They are not members of an NAIA conference that sponsors swimming.)	BC
University of the Cumberlands	Cumberlands Patriots	✓	✓	✓	MSC	KY
University of Saint Mary (KS)	Saint Mary Spires	✗	✓	✓	KCAC	KS
University of Victoria	Victoria Vikes	✗	✓	✓	Independent	BC
West Virginia University Institute of Technology	West Virginia Tech Golden Bears	✗	✓	✓	AAC	WV
Westmont College	Westmont Warriors	✗	✗	✓	PCSC	CA
Williams Baptist University	WBU Eagles	✗	✓	✓	Independent	AR

== NJCAA ==
Institution	Athletic team	Diving	Men	Woman	State	Scholarship
Indian River State College	Indian River Pioneers	✓	✓	✓	FL	✓
Barton Community College	Barton Cougars	✓	✓	✓	KS	✓
Erie Community College	Erie Kats	✓	✓	✓	NY	✗
Southwestern Oregon Community College	Southwestern Lakers	✗	✓	✓	OR	✓
Iowa Central Community College	Iowa Central Tritons	✗	✓	✓	IA	✓
Iowa Lakes Community College	Iowa Lakes Lakers	✗	✓	✓	IA	✓
Monroe Community College	Monroe Tribunes	✓	✓	✓	NY	✓
South Georgia State College	SGSC Hawks	✗	✓	✓	GA	✓
College of the Florida Keys	The Tugas	✗	✓	✓	FL	Unknown
Jamestown Community College	Jayhawks	✗	✓	✓	NY	Unknown
Genesee Community College	Cougars	✓	✓	✓	NY	Unknown
Herkimer County Community College	The Generals	✗	✓	✓	NY	Unknown

== See also ==
- NCAA Division I
- List of NCAA Division I institutions
- NCAA Division I men's swimming and diving championships
- NCAA Division I women's swimming and diving championships
- NCAA Division II
- List of NCAA Division II institutions
- NCAA Division III
- List of NCAA Division III institutions
- List of NCAA conferences
- National Association of Intercollegiate Athletics
- NAIA men's swimming and diving championships
- NAIA women's swimming and diving championships
