= Conference of New England =

NCAA Division III sports conference in New England

- Formerly: Commonwealth Coast Conference (1984–2024)
- Association: NCAA
- Founded: 1984
- Commissioner: Julie Beer (since 2025)
- Sports fielded: 21; men's: 10; women's: 11
- Division: Division III
- No. of teams: 11
- Headquarters: Beverly, MA, U.S.
- Region: New England
- Website: cnesports.org

Locations
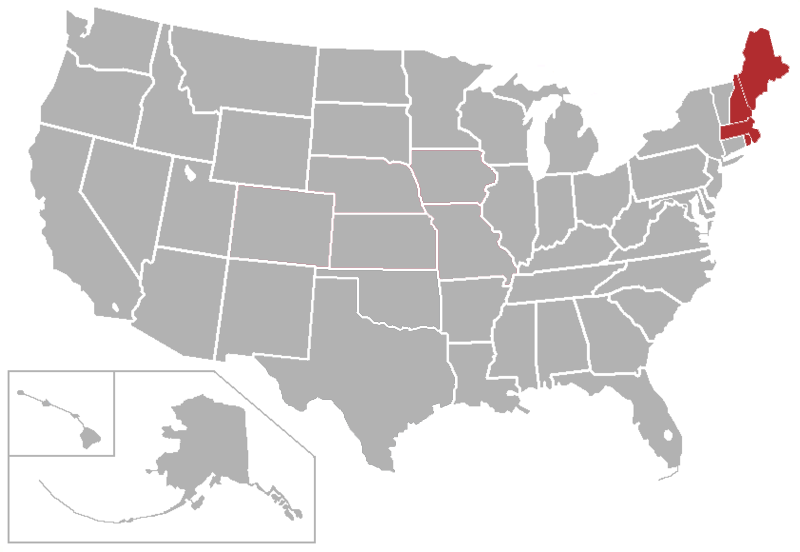

The Conference of New England (CNE), formerly known as the Commonwealth Coast Conference (CCC), is an intercollegiate athletic conference affiliated with the NCAA's Division III. Member institutions are located in New England in the states of Connecticut, Maine, Massachusetts, and Rhode Island.

== Overview ==
Previous logo

The CCC and Commonwealth Coast Football unveiled a new family of logos during a June 2019 visual rebrand.

== History ==
Location of current members:
full member
associate member

=== Recent events ===
On June 21, 2022, the University of Hartford announced that it would join the CCC, starting the 2023–24 academic year; while Salve Regina announced it would leave both the CCC and CCC Football to join the New England Women's and Men's Athletic Conference (NEWMAC), once concluding the 2022–23 school year.

On December 8, 2022, Johnson & Wales (R.I.) announced it would join the CCC as soon as the 2024–25 academic year. first as an associate member for men's and women's ice hockey, before eventually going for full membership status,

In 2023, two schools announced they would be reinstating their varsity football programs and joining the CCC for football, starting the 2025 fall season (2025–26 academic year); first Maine Maritime Academy on January 9, then New England College followed suit on November 14.

On August 1, 2024, 40 years after it was founded, the conference announced that it would be rebranding as the Conference of New England (CNE), effective with the 2024–25 season.

On September 12, 2024, the CNE announced that it would add a women's golf championship in the 2025–26 academic year, coinciding with the addition of the sport by full member Roger Williams; giving the CNE the six women's golf members needed to qualify for an automatic bid to the NCAA championship.

On August 19, 2025, the CNE announced that it would add men's volleyball as its 22nd championship sport, beginning in the 2026–27 academic year. Full members Curry, Endicott, Nichols, and Wentworth will be joined by associates Bard College, the State University of New York at Potsdam (SUNY Potsdam) and the Johnson campus of Vermont State University (VSU Johnson).

=== Chronological timeline ===
- 1984 – On 1984, the Commonwealth Coast Conference (CCC) was founded. Charter members included Anna Maria College, Curry College, Emerson College, Hellenic College, Salve Regina College (now Salve Regina University), the United States Coast Guard Academy (Coast Guard) and Wentworth Institute of Technology (Wentworth Tech), beginning the 1984–85 academic year.
- 1985:
  - Hellenic left the CCC after the 1984–85 academic year, when the school dropped its athletic program after lasting only one season.
  - Roger Williams College (now Roger Williams University) joined the CCC in the 1985–86 academic year.
- 1986 – The CCC was granted membership within the National Collegiate Athletic Association (NCAA) Division III ranks in the 1986–87 academic year.
- 1987:
  - The U.S. Coast Guard left the CCC to join the Constitution Athletic Conference after the 1986–87 academic year.
  - Gordon College joined the CCC in the 1987–88 academic year.
- 1988 – Regis College joined the CCC in the 1988–89 academic year.
- 1989:
  - Emerson left the CCC to become an NCAA D-III Independent after the 1988–89 academic year.
  - New England College of New Hampshire joined the CCC in the 1989–90 academic year.
- 1992 – Eastern Nazarene College joined the CCC in the 1992–93 academic year.
- 1995 – Colby–Sawyer College and Nichols College joined the CCC in the 1995–96 academic year.
- 1999 – Endicott College and the University of New England of Maine joined the CCC in the 1999–2000 academic year.
- 2007 – Western New England University joined the CCC in the 2007–08 academic year.
- 2011 – Four member schools left the CCC to join their respective new home primary conferences, all effective after the 2010–11 academic year:
  - Anna Maria to the Great Northeast Athletic Conference (GNAC)
  - Regis (Mass.) to the New England Collegiate Conference (NECC)
  - Colby–Sawyer and New England (N.H.) to the North Atlantic Conference (NAC)
- 2016 – Becker College, Johnson and Wales University, Providence and Suffolk University joined the CCC as associate members for men's ice hockey in the 2016–17 academic year.
- 2017:
  - The CCC added football as a sponsored sport, although not directly as it absorbed the former and defunct New England Football Conference and rebranded as Commonwealth Coast Football (CCC Football) in the 2017 fall season (2017–18 academic year).
  - Becker added football to join the CCC Football league in the 2017 fall season (2017–18 academic year).
- 2018:
  - Eastern Nazarene left the CCC to join the NECC after the 2017–18 academic year.
  - Johnson & Wales (R.I.) and Suffolk left the CCC as associate members for men's ice hockey after the 2017–18 academic year.
- 2019 – Husson University joined CCC Football in the 2019 fall season (2019–20 academic year).
- 2020 – Suffolk upgraded as a full member of the CCC for all sports in the 2020–21 academic year.
- 2022 – Due to changes in NCAA legislation regarding the number of member schools required for an automatic qualifier (AQ), football was fully incorporated into the CCC multi-sport conference, eliminating the need for the single-sport Commonwealth Coast Football league, beginning the 2022–23 academic year.
- 2023:
  - Salve Regina left the CCC (and CCC Football) to join the New England Women's and Men's Athletic Conference (NEWMAC) after the 2022–23 academic year; while it remained in the conference as an associate member for men's and women's ice hockey only for the 2023–24 academic year.
  - The University of Hartford joined the CCC in the 2023–24 academic year.
- 2024:
  - The University of Saint Joseph of Connecticut (with Colby–Sawyer returning) joined the CCC as associate members for men's tennis in the 2025 spring season (2024–25 academic year).
  - The CCC was rebranded as the Conference of New England (CNE), effective beginning the 2024–25 academic year.
  - Johnson & Wales (R.I.) returned to the CNE as an associate member for men's and women's ice hockey for the 2024–25 academic year.
  - CNE added a women's golf championship in the 2025–26 academic year, coinciding with the addition of the sport by full member Roger Williams; giving the CNE the six women's golf members needed to qualify for an automatic bid to the NCAA championship.
- 2025:
  - Johnson & Wales (R.I.) upgraded as a full member of the CNE for all sports, beginning the 2025–26 academic year.
  - Maine Maritime Academy (with New England (N.H.) following suit) reinstated their varsity football programs and joined the CNE as associate members for football in the 2025 fall season (2025–26 academic year).
- 2026:
  - Salve Regina rejoined the CNE as an associate member for men's and women's ice hockey, beginning with the 2026–27 academic year.
  - Bard College, the State University of New York at Potsdam (SUNY Potsdam) and the Johnson campus of Vermont State University (VSU Johnson) joined the CNE as associate members for men's volleyball, beginning the 2027 spring season (2026–27 academic year).

== Member schools ==
=== Current members ===
The CNE currently has 11 full members, all private schools.

| Institution | Location | Founded | Affiliation | Enrollment | Nickname | Joined (Note: Represents the calendar year when fall sports competition begins.) | Colors |
|---|---|---|---|---|---|---|---|
| Curry College | Milton, Massachusetts | 1879 | Nonsectarian | 2,410 | Colonels | 1984 | |
| Endicott College | Beverly, Massachusetts | 1939 | Nonsectarian | 4,528 | Gulls | 1999 | |
| Gordon College | Wenham, Massachusetts | 1889 | Evangelical | 1,816 | Fighting Scots | 1987 | |
| University of Hartford | West Hartford, Connecticut | 1877 | Nonsectarian | 6,792 | Hawks | 2023 | |
| Johnson & Wales University | Providence, Rhode Island | 1914 | Nonsectarian | 4,652 | Wildcats | 2025 (Note: Johnson & Wales competed in the CCC as an associate member for men's ice hockey from 2016–17 to 2017–18, and later on for both men's and women's ice hockey during the 2024–25 school year, before became an full member starting in 2025–26.) | |
| Nichols College | Dudley, Massachusetts | 1815 | Nonsectarian | 1,518 | Bison | 1995 | |
| Roger Williams University | Bristol, Rhode Island | 1956 | Nonsectarian | 4,702 | Hawks | 1985 | |
| Suffolk University | Boston, Massachusetts | 1906 | Nonsectarian | 6,832 | Rams | 2020 (Note: Suffolk competed in the CCC as an associate member for men's ice hockey from 2016–17 to 2017–18.) | |
| University of New England | Biddeford, Maine | 1831 | Nonsectarian | 7,208 | Nor'easters | 1999 | |
| Wentworth Institute of Technology | Boston, Massachusetts | 1904 | Nonsectarian | 4,397 | Leopards | 1984 | |
| Western New England University | Springfield, Massachusetts | 1919 | Nonsectarian | 3,702 | Golden Bears | 2007 | |

=== Associate members ===
The CNE currently has nine associate members, all but two are private schools:

| Institution | Location | Founded | Affiliation | Enrollment | Nickname | Joined (Note: Represents the calendar year when fall sports competition begins.) | Primary conference | CNE sport(s) | Colors |
|---|---|---|---|---|---|---|---|---|---|
| Bard College | Annandale-on- Hudson, New York | 1860 | Episcopalian | 2,303 | Raptors | 2026 | Liberty (LL) | Men's volleyball | |
| Colby–Sawyer College | New London, New Hampshire | 1946 | Nonsectarian | 2,262 | Chargers | 2024 | Great Northeast (GNAC) | Men's tennis | |
| Husson University | Bangor, Maine | 1898 | Nonsectarian | 3,476 | Eagles | 2019 | North Atlantic (NAC) | Football | |
| Maine Maritime Academy | Castine, Maine | 1941 | Public | 941 | Mariners | 2025 | North Atlantic (NAC) | Football | |
| New England College | Henniker, New Hampshire | 1946 | Nonsectarian | 4,327 | Pilgrims | 2025 | Great Northeast (GNAC) | Football | |
| University of Saint Joseph | West Hartford, Connecticut | 1932 | Catholic (R.S.M.) | 2,467 | Blue Jays | 2024 | Great Northeast (GNAC) | Men's tennis | |
| Salve Regina University | Newport, Rhode Island | 1934 | Catholic (Sisters of Mercy) | 2,771 | Seahawks | 2026 | New England (NEWMAC) | Men's ice hockey | |
| Salve Regina University | Newport, Rhode Island | 1934 | Catholic (Sisters of Mercy) | 2,771 | Seahawks | 2026 | New England (NEWMAC) | Women's ice hockey | |
| State University of New York at Potsdam (SUNY Potsdam) | Potsdam, New York | 1816 | Public (Note: Part of the State University of New York System.) | 2,519 | Bears | 2026 | S.U. New York (SUNYAC) | Men's volleyball | |
| Vermont State University–Johnson (VSU Johnson or Johnson) | Johnson, Vermont | 1881 | Public (Note: Part of the Vermont State University System.) | 1,803 | Badgers | 2026 | North Atlantic (NAC) | Men's volleyball | |

=== Former members ===
The CNE had nine former full members, with all but one being private schools.

| Institution | Location | Founded | Affiliation | Enrollment | Nickname | Joined (Note: Represents the calendar year when fall sports competition begins.) | Left (Note: Represents the calendar year when spring sports competition ends.) | Current conference |
|---|---|---|---|---|---|---|---|---|
| Anna Maria College | Paxton, Massachusetts | 1946 | Catholic | 1,432 | AMCats | 1984 | 2011 | Closed in 2026 |
| Colby–Sawyer College | New London, New Hampshire | 1837 | Nonsectarian | 1,200 | Chargers | 1995 | 2011 | Great Northeast (GNAC) |
| Eastern Nazarene College | Quincy, Massachusetts | 1900 | Nazarene | 1,063 | Lions | 1992 | 2018 | Closed in 2025 |
| Emerson College | Boston, Massachusetts | 1880 | Nonsectarian | 4,290 | Lions | 1984 | 1989 | New England (NEWMAC) |
| Hellenic College | Brookline, Massachusetts | 1937 | GOArch | 222 | Owls | 1984 | 1985 | N/A (Note: Hellenic dropped its athletics program following the 1984–85 school year.) |
| New England College | Henniker, New Hampshire | 1946 | Nonsectarian | 1,460 | Pilgrims | 1989 | 2011 | Great Northeast (GNAC) |
| Regis College (Note: This institution is a former women's college, which later had become a co-educational college (Regis (Mass.) since 2007–08).) | Weston, Massachusetts | 1927 | Catholic (S.S.J.) | 1,737 | Pride | 1988 | 2011 | Great Northeast (GNAC) |
| Salve Regina University | Newport, Rhode Island | 1934 | Catholic (Sisters of Mercy) | 2,771 | Seahawks | 1984 | 2023 | New England (NEWMAC) |
| United States Coast Guard Academy (Coast Guard) | New London, Connecticut | 1876 | Federal | 1,045 | Bears | 1984 | 1987 | New England (NEWMAC) |

=== Former associate members ===
The CNE had three former associate members, all private schools.

| Institution | Location | Founded | Affiliation | Enrollment | Nickname | Joined (Note: Represents the calendar year when fall sports competition begins.) | Left (Note: Represents the calendar year when spring sports competition ends.) | Primary conference | CCC/CNE sport(s) |
|---|---|---|---|---|---|---|---|---|---|
| Becker College | Worcester, Massachusetts | 1784 | Nonsectarian | 1,892 | Hawks | 2016 | 2021 | Closed in 2021 | Men's ice hockey |
| Becker College | Worcester, Massachusetts | 1784 | Nonsectarian | 1,892 | Hawks | 2017 | 2021 | Closed in 2021 | Football |
| Johnson & Wales University | Providence, Rhode Island | 1914 | Nonsectarian | 4,652 | Wildcats | 2016 | 2018 | C. New England (CNE) | Men's ice hockey |
| Johnson & Wales University | Providence, Rhode Island | 1914 | Nonsectarian | 4,652 | Wildcats | 2024 | 2025 | C. New England (CNE) | Men's ice hockey |
| Johnson & Wales University | Providence, Rhode Island | 1914 | Nonsectarian | 4,652 | Wildcats | 2024 | 2025 | C. New England (CNE) | Women's ice hockey |
| Suffolk University | Boston, Massachusetts | 1906 | Nonsectarian | 16,095 | Rams | 2016 | 2018 | C. New England (CNE) | Men's ice hockey |

=== Membership timeline ===
Full member (all sports) Full member (non-football) Associate member (football) Associate member (sport)

== Sports ==
The CNE sponsors intercollegiate athletic competition in 21 sports. The conference started sponsoring football in the 2017–18 season, absorbing the former football-only New England Football Conference. From 2017 to 2021 football was operated as a single-sport conference branded Commonwealth Coast Football. Due to changes in NCAA legislation regarding the number of members required for a conference to receive and automatic qualifier (AQ), football was fully incorporated into the multi-sport conference in 2022, eliminating the need for the football-only league. Women's ice hockey was added as a conference sport in 2020–21 when the CNE took over operations of the Colonial Hockey Conference. Women's golf was added in 2025–26, with men's volleyball to follow in 2026–27.

Championship sports
| Sport | Men's | Women's |
|---|---|---|
| Baseball | ✓ | |
| Basketball | ✓ | ✓ |
| Cross country | ✓ | ✓ |
| Field hockey | | ✓ |
| Football | ✓ | |
| Golf | ✓ | ✓ |
| Ice Hockey | ✓ | ✓ |
| Lacrosse | ✓ | ✓ |
| Soccer | ✓ | ✓ |
| Softball | | ✓ |
| Tennis | ✓ | ✓ |
| Track & Field | ✓ | ✓ |
| Volleyball | 2026–27 | ✓ |

=== Men's Sports ===
| School | Baseball | Basketball | Cross Country | Football | Golf | Ice Hockey | Lacrosse | Soccer | Tennis | Track & Field | Volleyball | Total CNE Sports |
|---|---|---|---|---|---|---|---|---|---|---|---|---|
| Curry | ✓ | ✓ | ✓ | ✓ | ✗ | ✓ | ✓ | ✓ | ✓ | ✓ | ✓ | 10 |
| Endicott | ✓ | ✓ | ✓ | ✓ | ✓ | ✓ | ✓ | ✓ | ✓ | ✗ | ✓ | 10 |
| Gordon | ✓ | ✓ | ✓ | ✗ | ✓ | ✗ | ✓ | ✓ | ✓ | ✓ | ✗ | 8 |
| Hartford | ✓ | ✓ | ✓ | ✗ | ✓ | ✗ | ✓ | ✓ | ✓ | ✓ | ✗ | 8 |
| Johnson & Wales | ✓ | ✓ | ✗ | ✗ | ✗ | ✓ | ✓ | ✓ | ✗ | ✗ | ✗ | 5 |
| New England | ✗ | ✓ | ✓ | ✓ | ✓ | ✓ | ✓ | ✓ | ✓ | ✗ | ✗ | 8 |
| Nichols | ✓ | ✓ | ✓ | ✓ | ✓ | ✓ | ✓ | ✓ | ✓ | ✓ | ✓ | 11 |
| Roger Williams | ✓ | ✓ | ✓ | ✗ | ✓ | ✓ | ✓ | ✓ | ✓ | ✓ | ✗ | 9 |
| Suffolk | ✓ | ✓ | ✓ | ✗ | ✓ | ✓ | ✗ | ✓ | ✓ | ✓ | ✗ | 8 |
| Wentworth Tech | ✓ | ✓ | ✓ | ✗ | ✓ | ✓ | ✓ | ✓ | ✓ | ✓ | ✓ | 10 |
| Western New England | ✓ | ✓ | ✓ | ✓ | ✓ | ✓ | ✓ | ✓ | ✓ | ✓ | ✗ | 10 |
| Totals | 10 | 11 | 10 | 5+3 | 9 | 9+1 | 10 | 11 | 10+2 | 8 | 4+3 | 97+9 |
Associate Members
| Bard | | | | | | | | | | | ✓ | 1 |
| Colby–Sawyer | | | | | | | | | ✓ | | | 1 |
| Husson | | | | ✓ | | | | | | | | 1 |
| Maine Maritime | | | | ✓ | | | | | | | | 1 |
| New England (NH) | | | | ✓ | | | | | | | | 1 |
| Saint Joseph | | | | | | | | | ✓ | | | 1 |
| Salve Regina | | | | | | ✓ | | | | | | 1 |
| SUNY Potsdam | | | | | | | | | | | ✓ | 1 |
| VSU-Johnson | | | | | | | | | | | ✓ | 1 |

==== Men's varsity sports not sponsored by CNE ====
| School | Equestrian (Note: Not sponsored by the NCAA.) | Rowing | Sailing | Swimming | Wrestling |
|---|---|---|---|---|---|
| Endicott | ✓ | | | | |
| Gordon | | ✓ | | METS | |
| Johnson & Wales | ✓ Co-Ed | | | | NEWA |
| Roger Williams | ✓ Co-Ed | | ✓ Co-Ed | NJAC | NEWA |
| Western New England | | | | | NEWA |

=== Women's Sports ===
| School | Basketball | Cross Country | Field Hockey | Golf | Ice Hockey | Lacrosse | Soccer | Softball | Tennis | Track & Field | Volleyball | Total CNE Sports |
|---|---|---|---|---|---|---|---|---|---|---|---|---|
| Curry | ✓ | ✓ | ✗ | ✗ | ✓ | ✓ | ✓ | ✓ | ✓ | ✓ | ✓ | 9 |
| Endicott | ✓ | ✓ | ✓ | ✗ | ✓ | ✓ | ✓ | ✓ | ✓ | ✓ | ✓ | 10 |
| Gordon | ✓ | ✓ | ✓ | ✓ | ✗ | ✓ | ✓ | ✓ | ✓ | ✓ | ✓ | 10 |
| Hartford | ✓ | ✓ | ✓ | ✓ | ✗ | ✓ | ✓ | ✓ | ✓ | ✓ | ✓ | 10 |
| Johnson & Wales | ✓ | ✓ | ✓ | ✗ | ✓ | ✓ | ✓ | ✓ | ✗ | ✓ | ✓ | 9 |
| New England | ✓ | ✓ | ✓ | ✓ | ✓ | ✓ | ✓ | ✓ | ✓ | ✓ | ✓ | 11 |
| Nichols | ✓ | ✓ | ✓ | ✓ | ✓ | ✓ | ✓ | ✓ | ✓ | ✓ | ✓ | 11 |
| Roger Williams | ✓ | ✓ | ✓ | ✓ | ✓ | ✓ | ✓ | ✓ | ✓ | ✓ | ✓ | 10 |
| Suffolk | ✓ | ✓ | ✗ | ✓ | ✓ | ✓ | ✓ | ✓ | ✓ | ✓ | ✓ | 10 |
| Wentworth Tech | ✓ | ✓ | ✗ | ✗ | ✗ | ✓ | ✓ | ✓ | ✗ | ✓ | ✓ | 7 |
| Western New England | ✓ | ✓ | ✓ | ✗ | ✓ | ✓ | ✓ | ✓ | ✓ | ✓ | ✓ | 10 |
| Totals | 11 | 11 | 8 | 6 | 8+1 | 11 | 11 | 11 | 9 | 11 | 11 | 108+1 |
Associate Members
| Salve Regina | | | | | ✓ | | | | | | | 1 |

==== Women's varsity sports not sponsored by CNE ====
| School | Equestrian (Note: Though recognized by the NCAA as part of its Emerging Sports for Women program, Division III has not added the sport to that program.) | Rowing | Rugby (Note: Part of the NCAA Emerging Sports for Women program in all NCAA divisions.) | Sailing (Note: Not sponsored by the NCAA.) | Swimming | Wrestling (Note: De facto Division I sport through 2026–27, with the NCAA championship meet open to members of all divisions. A separate Division III championship will be established in 2027–28.) |
|---|---|---|---|---|---|---|
| Endicott | ✓ | | | | | |
| Gordon | | ✓ | | | METS | |
| Johnson & Wales | ✓ Co-Ed | | | | | |
| New England | | | NIRA | | LEC | |
| Roger Williams | ✓ Co-Ed | | | ✓ Co-Ed | NJAC | |
| Western New England | | | | | LEC | ✓ |
