= New England Collegiate Conference =

NCAA Division III athletic conference since 2007

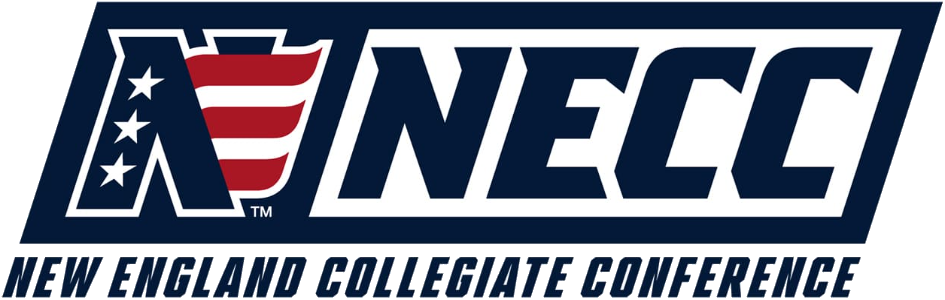
- Association: NCAA
- Founded: 2007; 19 years ago
- Commissioner: Jacob VanRyn (since 2019)
- Sports fielded: Men's volleyball and Esports
- Division: Division III
- No. of teams: 7 men's volleyball, 27 Esports
- Headquarters: Mansfield, Massachusetts
- Region: New England
- Website: neccathletics.com

Locations
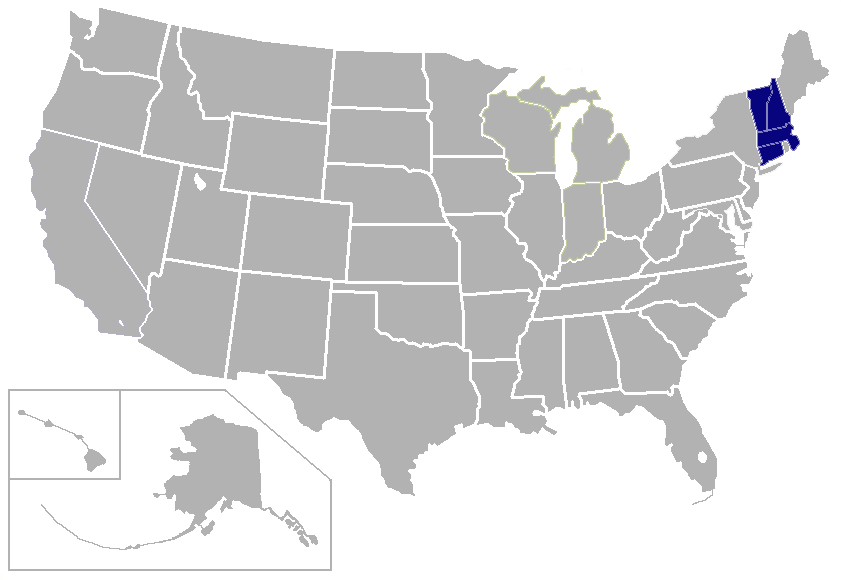

The New England Collegiate Conference (NECC) is an NCAA Division III men's volleyball and esports college athletic conference based in the Northeastern United States. The NECC was formerly an all-sports conference from 2008 to 2023. The conference rebranded as the New England Volleyball Conference (NEVC), starting in the 2023–24 school year after becoming a men's volleyball-only conference and continuing until 2026–27.

== History ==
New England Collegiate Conference
Locations of NECC members, 2021-2022 full and associate

In June 2007, nine colleges from New England announced the creation of a new athletic conference under the same NECC name.

The conference, which began operations July 1, 2008, in Division III, currently includes Lesley University (Cambridge), Mitchell College (New London, Connecticut), Eastern Nazarene College (Quincy) and New England College (Henniker, New Hampshire) as members. Their indicated locations are in Massachusetts unless otherwise noted.

Southern Vermont and Newbury both announced they would cease operations after the 2018–19 academic year, and founding member Becker College announced the same after the 2020–21 school year. Elms College joined the Great Northeast Athletic Conference, where it had competed as a swimming and diving affiliate since 2008, in the 2021-22 academic year. In July 2021, original member Bay Path was admitted to the United States Collegiate Athletic Association (USCAA), implicitly leaving the conference and the NCAA. Also, the State University of New York Polytechnic Institute (SUNY Poly) and the State University of New York at Potsdam (SUNY Potsdam) joined the NECC as associate members for men's volleyball, beginning almost immediately within the 2022 spring season.

Within the past year, there have been changes. Bard College joined the NECC for men's volleyball as an associate member beginning the spring of 2023. Lesley received and accepted an invitation to join the North Atlantic Conference (NAC), while Mitchell and New England College both accepted an invitation to the Great Northeast Athletic Conference (GNAC), all beginning the 2023-24 season. In 2023 it was announced that Eastern Nazarene College would also be joining the NAC.

The NECC may remain in operation for men's volleyball and the non-NCAA sport of esports. The conference has nine men's volleyball members in the current 2023 season, and the NCAA's official membership database lists all nine NECC men's volleyball teams as being members of the "New England Volleyball Conference". Over 25 schools are affiliate members in esports.

=== Chronological timeline ===
- 2007 – On May 31, 2007, The New England Collegiate Conference (NECC) was founded. Charter members included Bay Path College (now Bay Path University), Becker College, Daniel Webster College, Elms College, Lesley University, Mitchell College, Newbury College, Southern Vermont College and Wheelock College, beginning the 2008–09 academic year.
- 2008 – Springfield College and Massachusetts Institute of Technology (MIT) joined the NECC as associate members for men's golf in the 2008 fall season (2008–09 academic year).
- 2009:
  - Massachusetts Tech (MIT) left the NECC as an associate member for men's golf as the school dropped the sport (due to budget cuts) after the 2008–09 academic year.
  - Babson College joined the NECC as an associate member for men's golf in the 2009 fall season (2009–10 academic year).
- 2011:
  - Regis College joined the NECC in the 2011–12 academic year.
  - Endicott College joined the NECC as an associate member for men's volleyball in the 2012 spring season (2011–12 academic year).
- 2016 – Eastern Nazarene College joined the NECC as an associate member for men's volleyball in the 2017 spring season (2016–17 academic year).
- 2017:
  - Two institutions left the NECC to join their respective new home primary conferences, both effective after the 2016–17 academic year:
    - Regis joined the Great Northeast Athletic Conference (GNAC)
    - the second, Daniel Webster, ceased operations
  - Dean College joined the NECC in the 2017–18 academic year.
- 2018:
  - Wheelock left the NECC after the 2017–18 academic year; as the school announced that it would be merged into Boston University.
  - New England College join the NECC (with Eastern Nazarene upgrading for all sports), both effective in the 2018–19 academic year.
  - Nichols College joined the NECC as an associate member for men's volleyball in the 2019 spring season (2018–19 academic year).
- 2019:
  - Newbury and Southern Vermont left the NECC after the 2018–19 academic year; as both schools announced that they ceased operations.
  - Springfield and Babson left the NECC as associate members for men's golf after the 2018–19 academic year.
  - Five institutions joined the NECC as associate members, all effective in the 2019–20 academic year:
    - Husson University, the University of Maine at Farmington, Manhattanville College and Thomas College for field hockey
    - and Johnson State College (later Northern Vermont University–Johnson, now Vermont State University–Johnson) for men's volleyball
- 2020:
  - Dean left the NECC to join the GNAC after the 2019–20 academic year.
  - Russell Sage College joined the NECC as an associate member for men's volleyball in the 2021 spring season (2020–21 academic year).
- 2021:
  - Three institutions left the NECC to join their respective new home primary conferences, all effective after the 2020–21 academic year; thus leaving the conference with four institutions to compete in the 2021–22 school year:
    - Bay Path would leave the NCAA to join the United States Collegiate Athletic Association (USCAA)
    - and Elms joined the GNAC
    - the third, Becker, ceased operations
  - The State University of New York Polytechnic Institute (SUNY Poly) and the State University of New York at Potsdam (SUNY Potsdam) joined the NECC as associate members for men's volleyball in the 2022 spring season (2021–22 academic year).
- 2022:
  - Manhattanville left the NECC as an associate member for field hockey to join the Atlantic East Conference (AEC) for that sport after the 2021 fall season (2021–22 academic year).
  - Bard College joined the NECC as an associate member for men's volleyball in the 2023 spring season (2022–23 academic year).
- 2023:
  - Three institutions left the NECC to join their respective new home primary conferences, all effective after the 2022–23 academic year:
    - Lesley to join the North Atlantic Conference (NAC)
    - and Mitchell and New England College (NEC) to join the GNAC
  - Eastern Nazarene left the NECC to join the NAC after the 2022–23 academic year. This effectively ended the NECC as an all-sports conference. However, Eastern Nazarene remained as an associate member in men's volleyball, thus the rebranding of the NECC as the New England Volleyball Conference (NEVC).
- 2024 – Eastern Nazarene left the NEVC after the 2024 spring season (2023–24 academic year) due to ceasing operations, consequently the school left as a men's volleyball-only member.
- 2026 – The NEVC will disband following the 2026 season as part of an agreement between it, the United Volleyball Conference, and three all-sports conferences—the Conference of New England (CNE), Empire 8, and New England Women's and Men's Athletic Conference (NEWMAC). Of the final NEVC members, Russell Sage and SUNY Poly will move men's volleyball to the Empire 8 (being full members of that conference), while the remaining six will join CNE men's volleyball (three as full members and three as affiliates).

== Member schools ==
=== Final full members ===
The NECC had four full members when it disbanded as an all-sports conference, all were private schools.

Institution	Location	Founded	Affiliation	Enrollment	Nickname	Joined (Note: Represents the calendar year when fall sports competition begins.)	Left (Note: Represents the calendar year when spring sports competition ends.)	Current conference
Eastern Nazarene College	Quincy, Massachusetts	1900	Nazarene	772	Lions	2018	2023	Closed in 2024
Lesley University (Note: This institution is a former women's college, which has eventually turned into a co-educational college (Lesley since 2005–06).)	Cambridge, Massachusetts	1909	Nonsectarian	6,593	Lynx	2008	2023	North Atlantic (NAC)
Mitchell College	New London, Connecticut	1938	Nonsectarian	572	Mariners	2008	2023	Great Northeast (GNAC)
New England College	Henniker, New Hampshire	1946	Nonsectarian	4,327	Pilgrims	2018	2023	Great Northeast (GNAC)

=== Final men's volleyball members ===
The NECC had eight associate members in men's volleyball at the time of its dissolution:

Institution	Location	Founded	Affiliation	Enrollment	Nickname	Joined (Note: Represents the calendar year when fall sports competition begins.)	NECC sport	Primary conference
Bard College	Annandale-on- Hudson, New York	1860	Private	2,051	Raptors	2022	Men's volleyball	Liberty (LL)
Curry College	Milton, Massachusetts	1879	Nonsectarian	2,410	Colonels	2025	Men's volleyball	New England (CNE)
Endicott College	Beverly, Massachusetts	1939	Nonsectarian	4,600	Gulls	2011	Men's volleyball	New England (CNE)
Nichols College	Dudley, Massachusetts	1815	Nonsectarian	1,915	Bison	2018	Men's volleyball	New England (CNE)
Russell Sage College (Note: The Sage Colleges, which were recognized by the NECC, NCAA, and the state of New York as a single institution, rebranded as Russell Sage College in July 2020 after consolidating the three components Sage previously consisted of—the women-only Russell Sage, the coeducational Sage College of Albany (SCA), and the Sage Graduate Schools. In the context of the NECC, Russell Sage's team consists mostly of former SCA students, since SCA was the only Sage component that enrolled male undergraduates.)	Albany/Troy, New York (Note: Russell Sage has campuses in both Albany and Troy, New York, but the former SCA operated only in Albany.)	1916 (Note: The Sage Colleges dated their history to the establishment of Russell Sage College in 1916. SCA was established in 1949 and adopted its historical name in 2002.)	Nonsectarian	1,600 (Note: Reflects Russell Sage's overall undergraduate enrollment. Enrollment in the former SCA, the only Sage component from which men's volleyball drew players, was about 850.)	Gators	2020	Men's volleyball	Empire 8 (E8)
State University of New York Polytechnic Institute (SUNY Poly)	Marcy, New York	1913	Public (Note: Part of the State University of New York System.)	3,061	Wildcats	2021	Men's volleyball	Empire 8 (E8)
State University of New York at Potsdam (SUNY Potsdam)	Potsdam, New York	1816	Public	3,098	Bears	2021	Men's volleyball	S.U. New York (SUNYAC)
Vermont State University–Johnson	Johnson, Vermont	1828 (Note: Northern Vermont University was founded in 2018 by the merger of Johnson State College, founded in 1828, and Lyndon State College, founded in 1911. The two campuses continue to operate separate athletic programs. Later, the two campuses would merge with Castleton University and Vermont Technical College to form Vermont State University in 2023.)	Public	1,333	Badgers	2019	Men's volleyball	North Atlantic (NAC)

=== Esports members ===
The NECC currently has twenty-seven associate members for esports, all but eight are private schools:

Institution	Location	Founded	Affiliation	Enrollment	Nickname	Joined (Note: Represents the calendar year when fall sports competition begins.)	Primary conference
Boise State University	Boise, Idaho	1932	Public	25,540	Broncos	2020	Mountain West (MW) (Note: Currently an NCAA Division I athletic conference.)
California State University, Dominguez Hills (Cal State Dominguez Hills)	Carson, California	1960	Public	17,027	Toros	2020	California (CCAA) (Note: Currently an NCAA Division II athletic conference.)
Carroll University	Waukesha, Wisconsin	1846	Presbyterian	3,358	Pioneers	2020	Illinois–Wisconsin (CCIW)
Central Methodist University	Fayette, Missouri	1854	United Methodist	3,382	Eagles	2020	Heart of America (HAAC) (Note: Currently an NAIA athletic conference.)
Champlain College	Burlington, Vermont	1878	Nonsectarian	2,900	Beavers	2020	N/A (Note: This institution has no varsity sports program.)
Hocking College	Nelsonville, Ohio	1968	Public	3,671	Hawks	2020	Ohio (OCCAC) (Note: Currently an NJCAA athletic conference.)
Hood College	Frederick, Maryland	1893	U.C.C.	2,052	Blazers	2020	MAC Commonwealth
Howard Community College	Columbia, Maryland	1966	Public (Note: This institution is a community college.)	29,894	Dragons	2020	Maryland (MDJUCO)
Illinois Wesleyan University	Bloomington, Illinois	1850	Nonsectarian	1,893	Titans	2020	Illinois–Wisconsin (CCIW)
Jackson College	Jackson, Michigan	1928	Public	5,487	Jets	2020	Michigan (MCCAA)
Kansas Wesleyan University	Salina, Kansas	1886	United Methodist	710	Coyotes	2020	Kansas (KCAC)
Lakeland University	Plymouth, Wisconsin	1862	U.C.C.	3,973	Muskies	2020	Northern (NACC)
Midland University	Fremont, Nebraska	1883	Lutheran ELCA	1,394	Warriors	2020	Great Plains (GPAC)
Monroe University	New York City, New York	1933	For-profit	6,794	Mustangs	2020	NJCAA Independent
University of Montana	Missoula, Montana	1893	Public	10,962	Grizzlies & Lady Griz	2020	Big Sky (BSC)
Mount St. Mary's University	Emmitsburg, Maryland	1808	Catholic	2,240	Mountaineers	2020	Metro Atlantic (MAAC)
Newberry College	Newberry, South Carolina	1856	Nonsectarian	1,250	Wolves	2020	South Atlantic (SAC)
Northcentral Technical College	Wausau, Wisconsin	1912	Public (Note: This institution is a state technical college.)	6,395	Timberwolves	2020	N/A
Northern Essex Community College	Essex County, Massachusetts	1961	Public	6,600	Knights	2020	Massachusetts (MCCAA)
Randolph–Macon College	Ashland, Virginia	1830	United Methodist	1,419	Yellow Jackets	2020	Old Dominion (ODAC)
University of Rio Grande	Rio Grande, Ohio	1876	Nonsectarian	2,300	RedStorm	2020	River States (RSC)
California State University, Sacramento (Sacramento State)	Sacramento, California	1947	Public	31,156	Hornets	2020	Big Sky (BSC)
St. Ambrose University	Davenport, Iowa	1882	Catholic	3,607	Fighting Bees	2020	Chicagoland (CCAC)
Tiffin University	Tiffin, Ohio	1888	Nonsectarian	4,282	Dragons	2020	Great Midwest (G-MAC)
Upper Iowa University	Fayette, Iowa	1857	Nonsectarian	6,158	Peacocks	2020	Northern Sun (NSIC)
Valparaiso University	Valparaiso, Indiana	1859	Lutheran	4,500	Beacons	2020	Missouri Valley (MVC)
Westcliff University	Irvine, California	1993	Nonsectarian	2,779	Warriors	2020	California Pacific (CalPac)

Notes

New England Collegiate Conference Esports
Locations of NECC eSports associate members, 2021-2022 associate

=== Former members ===
The NECC had nine former full members, all were private schools:

Institution	Location	Founded	Affiliation	Enrollment	Nickname	Joined (Note: Represents the calendar year when fall sports competition begins.)	Left (Note: Represents the calendar year when spring sports competition ends.)	Current conference
Bay Path University (Note: This institution was a women's college, therefore it did not compete in men's sports.)	Longmeadow, Massachusetts	1897	Nonsectarian	3,298	Wildcats	2008	2021	USCAA Independent
Becker College	Worcester, Massachusetts	1784	Nonsectarian	N/A	Hawks	2008	2021	Closed in 2021
Dean College	Franklin, Massachusetts	1865	Nonsectarian	1,055	Bulldogs	2017	2020	Great Northeast (GNAC)
Daniel Webster College	Nashua, New Hampshire	1965	For-profit	N/A	Eagles	2008	2017	Closed in 2017
Elms College	Chicopee, Massachusetts	1899	Catholic (S.S.J.)	1,713	Blazers	2008	2021	Great Northeast (GNAC)
Newbury College	Brookline, Massachusetts	1962	Nonsectarian	N/A	Nighthawks	2008	2019	Closed in 2019
Regis College	Weston, Massachusetts	1927	Catholic (S.S.J.)	2,748	Pride	2011	2017	Great Northeast (GNAC)
Southern Vermont College	Bennington, Vermont	1926	Nonsectarian	N/A	Mountaineers	2008	2019	Closed in 2019
Wheelock College	Boston, Massachusetts	1888	Nonsectarian	N/A	Wildcats	2008	2018	N/A (Note: Wheelock was merged with Boston University in 2018.)

=== Former associate members ===
The NECC had eight former associate members, all but one were private schools.

Institution	Location	Founded	Affiliation	Enrollment	Nickname	Joined (Note: Represents the calendar year when fall sports competition begins.)	Left (Note: Represents the calendar year when spring sports competition ends.)	NECC sport	Primary conference
Babson College	Wellesley, Massachusetts	1919	Nonsectarian	3,340	Beavers	2009	2019	Men's golf	New England (NEWMAC)
Eastern Nazarene College (Note: Eastern Nazarene competed as a full member of the NECC from 2018–19 to 2022–23.)	Quincy, Massachusetts	1900	Nazarene	772	Lions	2016	2018	Men's volleyball	Closed in 2024
Eastern Nazarene College	Quincy, Massachusetts	1900	Nazarene	772	Lions	2023	2024	Men's volleyball	Closed in 2024
Husson University	Bangor, Maine	1898	Nonsectarian	3,476	Eagles	2019	2023	Field hockey	North Atlantic (NAC)
University of Maine at Farmington	Farmington, Maine	1863	Public (Note: Part of the University of Maine System.)	1,861	Beavers	2019	2023	Field hockey	North Atlantic (NAC)
Manhattanville College	Purchase, New York	1841	Catholic (RSCJ)	2,494	Valiants	2019	2022	Field hockey	Skyline
Massachusetts Institute of Technology (MIT)	Cambridge, Massachusetts	1861	Nonsectarian	10,253	Engineers	2008	2009 (Note: MIT dropped the sport after just one season due to budget cuts.)	Men's golf	New England (NEWMAC)
Springfield College	Springfield, Massachusetts	1919	Nonsectarian	5,062	Pride	2008	2019	Men's golf	New England (NEWMAC)
Thomas College	Waterville, Maine	1894	Nonsectarian	1,949	Terriers	2019	2023	Field hockey	North Atlantic (NAC)

=== Membership timeline ===
Full member (all sports) Full member (non-football) Associate member (football) Associate member (sport)

== Sports ==
Conference sports
Sport	Men's	Women's
Baseball	4	-
Basketball	4	4
Cross Country	4	4
Esports	29	
Field hockey	-	4
Golf	-	-
Lacrosse	3	3
Soccer	4	4
Softball	-	4
Volleyball	9	4
