= Great Northeast Athletic Conference =

NCAA Division III sports league in the Northeast United States

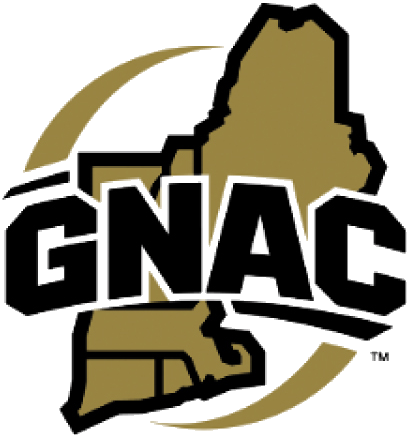
- Association: NCAA
- Founded: 1995; 31 years ago
- Commissioner: Joe Walsh (since 2005)
- Sports fielded: 22; men's: 11; women's: 11
- Division: Division III
- No. of teams: 14
- Headquarters: Winthrop, Massachusetts
- Region: New England
- Website: thegnac.com

Locations
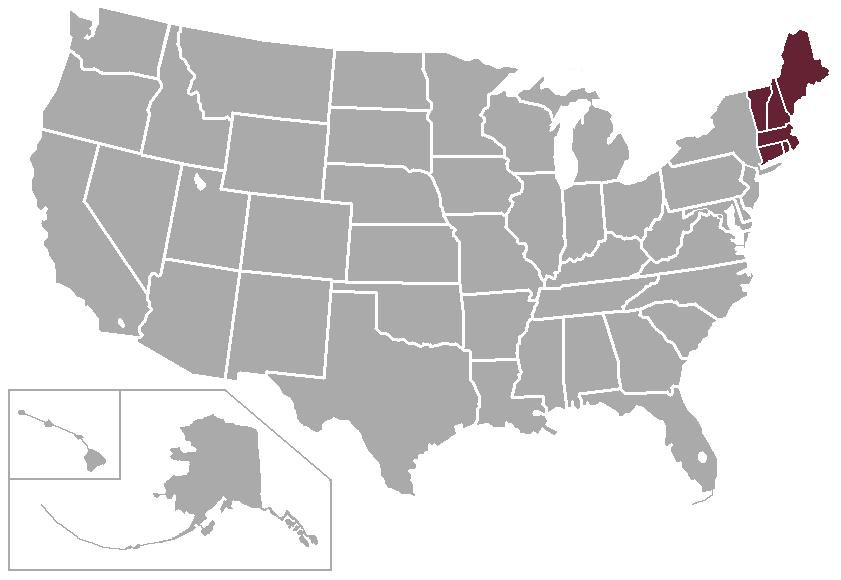

The Great Northeast Athletic Conference (GNAC) is an intercollegiate athletic conference which competes in the Division III ranks of the National Collegiate Athletic Association (NCAA).

== History ==
Great Northeast Athletic Conference
Locations of GNAC members, 2025–2026 full

=== Recent changes ===
On August 24, 2021, the University of New England joined the GNAC as an associate member for women's swimming & diving, beginning the 2021–22 academic year.

On June 16, 2022, New England (Me.) left the GNAC as an associate member for women's swimming & diving after the 2021–22 academic year, to join the Little East Conference (LEC) as an affiliate member for that sport.

On September 28, 2022, Mitchell College and New England College joined the GNAC, beginning the 2023–24 academic year.

=== Chronological timeline ===
- 1995 – In 1995, the Great Northeast Athletic Conference (GNAC) was founded. Charter members included the following: On men's sports and women's sports, Albertus Magnus College, Daniel Webster College, Emerson College, Endicott College, Johnson & Wales University, Rhode Island Campus and Rivier College (now Rivier University); on women's sports only, Emmanuel College, Pine Manor College, the University of Saint Joseph, Simmons College (now Simmons University) and Suffolk University, all beginning the 1995–96 academic year.
- 1998:
  - Norwich University, Southern Vermont College and Western New England College (now Western New England University) joined the GNAC in the 1998–99 academic year.
  - Suffolk added men's sports in its athletic program to join the GNAC in the 1998–99 academic year.
- 1999 – Endicott left the GNAC to join the Commonwealth Coast Conference (CCC) after the 1998–99 academic year.
- 2001 – Emmanuel (Mass.) added men's sports in its athletic program to join the GNAC in the 2001–02 academic year.
- 2004 – Elms College, Husson College (now Husson University) and Wheelock College joined the GNAC as associate members for women's swimming & diving in the 2004–05 academic year.
- 2006 – Rhode Island College, the University of Southern Maine and the University of Massachusetts at Dartmouth (a.k.a. Massachusetts–Dartmouth or UMass Dartmouth) joined the GNAC as associate members for men's golf in the 2007 spring season (2006–07 academic year).
- 2007:
  - Western New England left the GNAC to join the CCC after the 2006–07 academic year.
  - Lasell College (now Lasell University) and Mount Ida College and Saint Joseph's College of Maine joined the GNAC in the 2007–08 academic year.
- 2008 – Daniel Webster and Southern Vermont left the GNAC to join the New England Collegiate Conference (NECC) after the 2007–08 academic year.
- 2009 – Wheelock left the GNAC as an associate member for women's swimming & diving after the 2008–09 academic year.
- 2011:
  - Anna Maria College joined the GNAC in the 2011–12 academic year.
  - Three institutions joined the GNAC as associate members (and/or added other single sports into their associate memberships), all effective in the 2011–12 academic year:
    - Elms for men's swimming & diving
    - Regis College of Massachusetts for men's and women's swimming & diving
    - and Wentworth Institute of Technology (a.k.a. Wentworth Tech) for men's volleyball
- 2012:
  - Pine Manor left the GNAC to join the Great South Athletic Conference (GSAC) after the 2011–12 academic year.
  - Worcester State University joined the GNAC as an associate member for men's golf in the 2013 spring season (2012–13 academic year).
- 2013:
  - Emerson left the GNAC to join the New England Women's and Men's Athletic Conference (NEWMAC) after the 2012–13 academic year; while it remained in the conference as an associate member for men's volleyball since the 2014 spring season (2013–14 academic year).
  - Husson added men's swimming & diving into its GNAC associate membership in the 2013–14 academic year.
- 2017:
  - Colby–Sawyer College joined the GNAC as an associate member for men's and women's swimming & diving in the 2017–18 academic year.
  - Regis (Mass.) had upgraded as a full member of the GNAC for all sports in the 2017–18 academic year.
- 2018:
  - Mount Ida left the GNAC after the 2017–18 academic year; as the school ceased operations.
  - Colby–Sawyer had upgraded as a full member of the GNAC for all sports in the 2018–19 academic year.
  - Saint Joseph (Conn.) added men's sports in its athletic program to join the GNAC in the 2018–19 academic year.
  - Eastern Nazarene College joined the GNAC as an associate member for men's and women's tennis in the 2019 spring season (2018–19 academic year).
- 2019:
  - Worcester State left the GNAC as an associate member for men's golf after the 2019 spring season (2018–19 academic year).
  - Lesley University joined the GNAC as an associate member for men's tennis in the 2020 spring season (2019–20 academic year).
- 2020:
  - Five institutions left the GNAC as associate members, all effective after the 2019–20 academic year:
    - Lesley for men's tennis
    - Husson for men's and women's swimming & diving
    - and Rhode Island College, Southern Maine and UMass Dartmouth for men's golf
  - Suffolk left the GNAC to join the CCC after the 2019–20 academic year; although it remained in the conference as an associate member for men's and women's indoor track & field, beginning the 2020–21 school year.
  - Dean College joined the GNAC in the 2020–21 academic year.
  - Lesley rejoined the GNAC as an associate member for women's tennis in the 2021 spring season (2020–21 academic year).
- 2021 – Elms had upgraded as a full member of the GNAC for all sports in the 2021–22 academic year.
- 2021 – The University of New England joined the GNAC as an associate member for women's swimming & diving in the 2021–22 academic year.
- 2022 – Two institutions left the GNAC as associate members, both effective after the 2021–22 academic year:
  - New England (Me.) for women's swimming & diving to join the Little East Conference (LEC) for that sport
  - and Suffolk for men's and women's indoor track & field
- 2023:
  - Eastern Nazarene left the GNAC as an associate member for women's tennis after the 2023 spring season (2022–23 academic year).
  - Mitchell College and New England College joined the GNAC in the 2023–24 academic year.
- 2024 – Eastern Nazarene left the GNAC as an associate member for men's tennis after the 2024 spring season (2023–24 academic year).
- 2025 – Two institutions left the GNAC to join their respective new home primary conferences, both effective after the 2024–25 academic year:
  - Anna Maria to join the Massachusetts State Collegiate Athletic Conference (MASCAC)
  - and Johnson & Wales (R.I.) to join the Conference of New England (CNE; formerly the Commonwealth Coast Conference or CCC)
- 2026 – Men's volleyball associates Emerson and Wentworth will leave the GNAC for their respective all-sports conferences, the New England Women's and Men's Athletic Conference and CNE, both of which will start sponsoring men's volleyball in 2026–27.

== Member schools ==
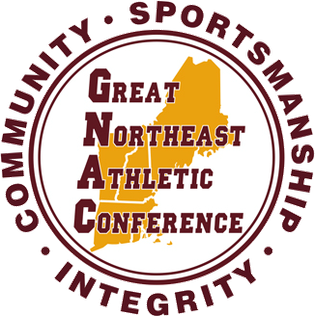
Former Great Northeast Athletic Conference until spring 2025

=== Current members ===
The GNAC currently has fourteen full members, all of which are private schools:

Institution	Location	Founded	Affiliation	Enrollment	Nickname	Colors	Joined (Note: Represents the calendar year when fall sports competition begins.)
Albertus Magnus College	New Haven, Connecticut	1925	Catholic (D.S.P.)	1,961	Falcons		1995
Colby–Sawyer College	New London, New Hampshire	1837	Nonsectarian	2,262	Chargers		2018
Dean College	Franklin, Massachusetts	1865	Nonsectarian	1,055	Bulldogs		2020
Elms College (Note: This institution is a former women's college, which has eventually turned into a co-educational college (Lasell since 1997–98, Elms since 1998–99, Emmanuel (Mass.) since 2001–02, Regis (Mass.) since 2007–08 and Saint Joseph (Conn.) since 2018–19).)	Chicopee, Massachusetts	1928	Catholic (S.S.J.)	1,713	Blazers		2021 (Note: Before joining for full membership, Elms competed in the GNAC as an associate member for swimming & diving from 2008–09 to 2020–21.)
Emmanuel College	Boston, Massachusetts	1919	Catholic (SNDdeN)	1,850	Saints		1995
Lasell University	Newton, Massachusetts	1851	Nonsectarian	2,200	Lasers		2007
Mitchell College	New London, Connecticut	1938	Nonsectarian	572	Mariners		2023
New England College	Henniker, New Hampshire	1946	Nonsectarian	4,327	Pilgrims		2023
Norwich University	Northfield, Vermont	1819	Private	2,300	Cadets		1998
Regis College	Weston, Massachusetts	1927	Catholic (S.S.J.)	2,748	Pride		2017
Rivier University	Nashua, New Hampshire	1933	Catholic (S.P.M.)	2,520	Raiders		1995
University of Saint Joseph	West Hartford, Connecticut	1932	Catholic (R.S.M.)	2,467	Blue Jays		1995
Saint Joseph's College of Maine	Standish, Maine	1912	Catholic (R.S.M.)	1,987	Monks		2007
Simmons University (Note: This institution is a women's college, therefore it does not compete in men's sports.) (Note: Non-basketball member; therefore Simmons had sponsored women's basketball until after at least the 2018–19 school year.)	Boston, Massachusetts	1899	Nonsectarian	1,900	Sharks		1995

=== Former members ===
The GNAC had ten former full members, all were private schools:

Institution	Location	Founded	Affiliation	Enrollment	Nickname	Joined (Note: Represents the calendar year when fall sports competition begins.)	Left (Note: Represents the calendar year when spring sports competition ends.)	Current conference
Anna Maria College	Paxton, Massachusetts	1946	Catholic (S.S.A.)	1,500	Amcats	2011	2025	Closed in 2026
Daniel Webster College	Nashua, New Hampshire	1965	For-profit	N/A	Eagles	1995	2008	Closed in 2017
Endicott College	Beverly, Massachusetts	1939	Nonsectarian	4,528	Gulls	1995	1999	C. New England (CNE)
Emerson College (Note: Emerson remains in the GNAC as an associate member for men's volleyball.)	Boston, Massachusetts	1880	Nonsectarian	4,290	Lions	1995	2013	New England (NEWMAC)
Johnson & Wales University	Providence, Rhode Island	1914	Nonsectarian	8,564	Wildcats	1995	2025	C. New England (CNE)
Mount Ida College	Newton, Massachusetts	1899	Nonsectarian	N/A	Mustangs	2007	2018	Closed in 2018
Pine Manor College (Note: This institution is a former women's college, which has eventually turned into a co-educational college (Pine Manor from 2014–15).)	Chestnut Hill, Massachusetts	1911	Nonsectarian	N/A	Gators	1995	2012	N/A (Note: Pine Manor was acquired by Boston College in 2021.)
Southern Vermont College	Bennington, Vermont	1929	Nonsectarian	N/A	Mountaineers	1998	2008	Closed in 2019
Suffolk University (Note: Suffolk competed as an associate member of the GNAC for men's and women's indoor track & field from 2020–21 to 2021–22.)	Boston, Massachusetts	1906	Nonsectarian	6,832	Rams	1995	2020	C. New England (CNE)
Western New England University	Springfield, Massachusetts	1919	Nonsectarian	3,702	Golden Bears	1998	2007	C. New England (CNE)

=== Former associate members ===
The GNAC had 14 former associate members, 9 were private schools while 5 were public schools:

Institution	Location	Founded	Affiliation	Enrollment	Nickname	Joined (Note: Represents the calendar year when fall sports competition begins.)	Left (Note: Represents the calendar year when spring sports competition ends.)	GNAC sport(s)	Primary conference
Eastern Nazarene College	Quincy, Massachusetts	1900	Nazarene	1,063	Lions	2018	2024	Men's tennis	Closed in 2025
Eastern Nazarene College	Quincy, Massachusetts	1900	Nazarene	1,063	Lions	2018	2023	Women's tennis	Closed in 2025
Emerson College (Note: Emerson was a full member of the GNAC from 1995–96 to 2012–13.)	Boston, Massachusetts	1880	Nonsectarian	4,290	Lions	2013	2026	Men's volleyball	New England (NEWMAC)
Husson University	Bangor, Maine	1898	Nonsectarian	3,500	Eagles	2008	2020	Men's swimming & diving	North Atlantic (NAC)
Husson University	Bangor, Maine	1898	Nonsectarian	3,500	Eagles	2008	2020	Women's swimming & diving	North Atlantic (NAC)
Lesley University	Cambridge, Massachusetts	1909	Nonsectarian	6,593	Lynx	2019	2020	Men's tennis	North Atlantic (NAC)
Lesley University	Cambridge, Massachusetts	1909	Nonsectarian	6,593	Lynx	2020	2023	Women's tennis	North Atlantic (NAC)
University of New England	Biddeford, Maine	1831	Nonsectarian	7,208	Nor'easters	2021	2022	Women's swimming & diving	C. New England (CNE)
Ramapo College	Mahwah, New Jersey	1969	Public	5,145	Roadrunners	2013	2019	Men's tennis	New Jersey (NJAC)
Rhode Island College	Providence, Rhode Island	1854	Nonsectarian	7,523	Anchormen	2008	2020	Men's golf	Little East (LEC)
Rutgers University–Camden	Camden, New Jersey	1950	Public	6,158	Scarlet; Raptors	2014	2019	Men's tennis	New Jersey (NJAC)
Rutgers University–Newark	Newark, New Jersey	1945	Public	12,321	Scarlet; Raiders	2013	2019	Men's tennis	New Jersey (NJAC)
University of Southern Maine	Portland, Maine	1878	Public	8,022	Huskies	2008	2020	Men's golf	Little East (LEC)
Suffolk University (Note: Suffolk was a full member of the GNAC from 1995–96 to 2019–20.)	Boston, Massachusetts	1906	Nonsectarian	6,832	Rams	2020	2022	Men's indoor track & field	C. New England (CNE)
Suffolk University	Boston, Massachusetts	1906	Nonsectarian	6,832	Rams	2020	2022	Women's indoor track & field	C. New England (CNE)
University of Massachusetts Dartmouth	North Dartmouth, Massachusetts	1895	Public	8,513	Corsairs	2012	2020	Men's golf	Little East (LEC) (Note: Massachusetts–Dartmouth (UMass Dartmouth) discontinued men's golf at the end of the 2019–20 school year due to budget cuts.)
Wentworth Institute of Technology	Boston, Massachusetts	1904	Nonsectarian	4,576	Leopards	2011	2026	Men's volleyball	C. New England (CNE)
Worcester State University	Worcester, Massachusetts	1874	Public (Note: Part of the Massachusetts State Universities System.)	5,611	Lancers	2012	2019	Men's golf	Mass. State (MASCAC)

=== Membership timeline ===
Full member (all sports) Full member (non-football) Associate member (football) Associate member (sport)

== Sports ==
A divisional format is used for basketball (M / W).
North
- Anna Maria
- Colby–Sawyer
- Emmanuel
- Norwich
- Rivier
- Saint Joseph (Maine)
South
- Albertus Magnus
- Dean
- Elms
- Lasell
- Regis
- Saint Joseph (Conn.)

Conference sports
Sport	Men's	Women's
Baseball	✓	
Basketball	✓	✓
Cross Country	✓	✓
Field Hockey		✓
Golf	✓	
Lacrosse	✓	✓
Soccer	✓	✓
Softball		✓
Swimming & Diving	✓	✓
Track & Field (Indoor)	✓	✓
Track & Field (Outdoor)	✓	✓
Volleyball	✓	✓

=== Men's sponsored sports by school ===
School	Baseball	Basketball	Cross Country	Golf	Lacrosse	Soccer	Swimming & Diving	Track & Field (Indoor)	Track & Field (Outdoor)	Volleyball	Total GNAC sports
Albertus Magnus	✓	✓	✗	✓	✓	✓	✗	✗ (Note: Adding in 2027-28)	✗	✗	5
Colby–Sawyer	✓	✓	✓	✗	✓	✓	✗	✓	✓	✗	7
Dean	✓	✓	✓	✓	✓	✓	✗	✗	✗	✓	7
Elms	✓	✓	✓	✓	✓	✓	✓ (Note: Swimming only)	✗	✗	✓	8
Emmanuel	✗	✓	✓	✓	✓	✓	✗	✓	✓	✓	8
Lasell	✓	✓	✓	✓	✓	✓	✗	✓	✓	✓	9
Mitchell	✓	✓	✓	✓	✓	✓	✗	✗	✗	✗	6
New England	✓	✓	✓	✓	✓	✓	✗	✓	✓	✗	8
Norwich	✓	✓	✓	✓	✓	✓	✓	✗	✗	✗	7
Regis	✗	✓	✓	✗	✓	✓	✓	✓	✓	✓	8
Rivier	✓	✓	✗	✗	✓	✓	✗	✗	✗	✓	5
Saint Joseph (CT)	✓	✓	✗	✗	✓	✓	✓	✗	✗	✗	5
Saint Joseph's (ME)	✓	✓	✓	✓	✓	✓	✓	✓	✓	✗	9
Totals	11	13	10	9	13	13	5	6	6	6+1	92+1
Associate Members
Rhode Island College										✓	1

==== Men's varsity sports not sponsored by the GNAC that are played by GNAC schools ====
School	Alpine Skiing (Note: The NCAA-recognized sport of skiing, a de facto Division I sport with a single coeducational team championship open to all divisions, combines the Alpine and Nordic disciplines.)	Football	Ice Hockey	Rifle (Note: De facto Division I sport; the NCAA organizes a single coeducational team championship open to all divisions.)	Rugby (Note: Not sponsored by the NCAA.)	Tennis	Wrestling
Albertus Magnus			UCHC			CUNY	
Colby–Sawyer	EISA					CNE	
Dean		MASCAC					
Emmanuel							IND
New England	✓	CNE	LEC				NEWA
Norwich		NEWMAC	LEC	MAC	NACR	Empire 8	NEWA
Rivier			MASCAC				
Saint Joseph (CT)			MASCAC			CNE	

=== Women's sponsored sports by school ===
School	Basketball	Cross Country	Field Hockey	Lacrosse	Soccer	Softball	Swimming & Diving	Track & Field (Indoor)	Track & Field (Outdoor)	Volleyball	Total GNAC sports
Albertus Magnus	✓	✗	✗	✓	✓	✓	✗	✗ (Note: Adding in 2027-28)	✗	✓	5
Colby–Sawyer	✓	✓	✓	✓	✓	✓	✗	✓	✓	✓	9
Dean	✓	✓	✓	✓	✓	✓	✗	✗	✗	✓	7
Elms	✓	✓	✓	✓	✓	✓	✓ (Note: Swimming only)	✗	✗	✓	8
Emmanuel	✓	✓	✗	✓	✓	✓	✗	✓	✓	✓	8
Lasell	✓	✓	✓	✓	✓	✓	✗	✓	✓	✓	9
Mitchell	✓	✓	✗	✓	✓	✓	✗	✗	✗	✓	6
New England	✓	✓	✓	✓	✓	✓	✗	✓	✓	✓	9
Norwich	✓	✓	✗	✓	✓	✓	✓	✗	✗	✓	7
Regis	✓	✓	✓	✓	✓	✓	✓	✓	✓	✓	10
Rivier	✓	✗	✓	✓	✓	✓	✗	✗	✗	✓	6
Saint Joseph (CT)	✓	✗	✓	✓	✓	✓	✓	✗	✗	✓	7
Saint Joseph's (ME)	✓	✓	✓	✓	✓	✓	✓	✓	✓	✓	10
Simmons	✗	✓	✓	✓	✓	✓	✓	✓	✓	✓	9
Totals	13	11	10	14	14	14	6	7	7	14	110

==== Women's varsity sports not sponsored by the GNAC that are played by GNAC schools ====
School	Alpine Skiing (Note: The NCAA-recognized sport of skiing, a de facto Division I sport with a single coeducational team championship open to all divisions, combines the Alpine and Nordic disciplines.)	Flag Football	Golf	Ice Hockey	Rifle (Note: De facto Division I sport; the NCAA organizes a single coeducational team championship open to all divisions.)	Rowing	Rugby (Note: Part of the NCAA Emerging Sports for Women program.)	Tennis	Wrestling (Note: De facto Division I sport through the 2026–27 school year, with the NCAA organizing a single team championship open to all divisions. A separate Division III championship will be established in 2027–28.)
Albertus Magnus			NWGC	UCHC				CUNY	
Colby–Sawyer	EISA							CNE	
Dean		2027-28							
Emmanuel									2026-27
Lasell			IND						
New England	✓			LEC			✓		IND
Norwich				LEC	MAC		NCR		IND
Rivier				MASCAC					
Saint Joseph (CT)				MASCAC				CNE	
Saint Joseph's (ME)		2027-28	IND						
Simmons						NEWMAC		NAC	
