= Queens Knights =

- University: Queens College, City University of New York
- NCAA: Division II
- Conference: East Coast (primary); Metropolitan Swimming Conference (affiliate); National Intercollegiate Women's Fencing Association (affiliate)
- Athletic director: Rob Twible
- Location: Queens, New York City, New York
- Varsity teams: 15
- Basketball arena: Fitzgerald Gymnasium
- Baseball stadium: Hennekens Stadium
- Soccer stadium: Varsity Soccer Field
- Aquatics center: Dina Axelrad Perry Pool
- Tennis venue: QC Tennis Bubble
- Nickname: Knights
- Colors: Blue, red, and silver
- Website: queensknights.com
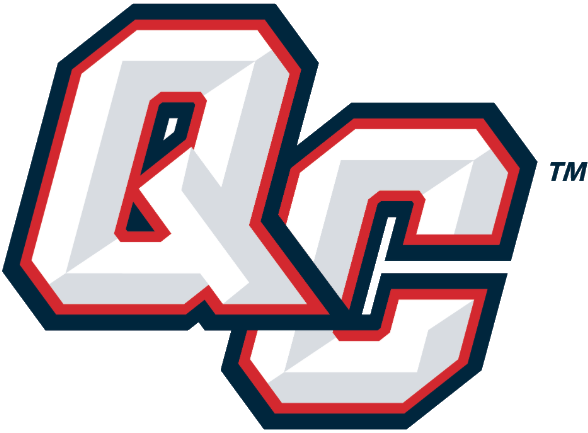

The Queens Knights are the athletic teams that represent Queens College, located in Queens, New York City, in NCAA Division II intercollegiate sports. The Knights compete as members of the East Coast Conference for all twelve of fifteen programs; the men's and women's swimming diving teams belong to the Metropolitan Swimming Conference while the women's fencing program competes in the National Intercollegiate Women's Fencing Association.

Queens have been a member of the ECC since its foundation in 1989. The Knights previously competed in the City University of New York Athletic Conference (CUNYAC) at the Division III level from 1978–79 to 1979–80.

== Varsity teams ==
Men's sports (6)

- Baseball
- Basketball
- Cross country
- Soccer
- Tennis
- Track and field

Women's sports (9)

- Basketball
- Cross country
- Dance
- Soccer
- Softball
- Swimming and diving
- Tennis
- Track and field
- Volleyball

== Individual programs ==
=== Men's basketball ===
The men's basketball team has put a team on the court in every season since its inception in 1938. On February 14, 2004, the team played its 1500th game and, in those 1500 games, has produced twenty 1,000-point scorers. Of these twenty players, twelve have achieved this after the college began play in NCAA Division II in 1983 and three of these players: Alan Hevesi (#5), Norman Roberts (#15) & Geoff Maloney (#22) have had their numbers retired. Although the program has a long-running record of achievement, its biggest successes have come in the 21st century. In 2001 the Knights won their first NCAA Division II Northeast Regional bid. A year later the team earned its second consecutive bid along with the program's first NYCAC championship. In 2005 the team once again was crowned NYCAC Champions and received an automatic bid to the NCAAs.

=== Baseball ===
With the exception of three years during World War II, the baseball program, like men's basketball, has fielded a team since 1938. In both 1967 and 1976 the team captured the Knickerbocker Conference championship, and in 1981 it won the CUNY championship. Their championships in 1976 and 1981 also earned them NCAA Division III tournament bids. More recently, the squad captured the NYCAC regular season championships in 1997 and 1998, the NYCAC tournament championship in 1998 and a bid to the NCAA Division II Northeast Regional. Seven players have been drafted and nine players have gone on to play professionally with organizations including the New York Yankees, Philadelphia Phillies, Chicago White Sox and Kansas City Royals. The latest of these draftees is 1998 All-American Justin Davies who, after playing in the Toronto Blue Jays organization for two seasons, has spent four years (2000–2004) as on outfielder for the Long Island Ducks of the Independent League.

=== Women's basketball ===
The women's basketball team has also experienced success. On March 24, 1973, the Knights, who were ranked #2 in the country, took the FitzGerald Gymnasium court with the AIAW (Association for Intercollegiate Athletics for Women) National Championship at stake. On February 22, 1975, they played in the first women's basketball game ever played in Madison Square Garden. Three players from this era (Debbie Mason (#15), Gail Marquis (#25) and Althea Gwyn (#31)) have had their numbers retired. On January 4, 2015, the two teams played in the Maggie Dixon Classic as a commemoration of the 40th anniversary of the original event. In the 2000s, the team has rebounded from a short down period to make a return to the NYCAC playoffs while producing several top-flight players, including Honorable Mention All-American in Carolyn Burke. In 2014 and 2015, under the Leadership of Bet Naumovski, the women's team won ECC Championships and advanced to the second round of NCAA postseason play in 2015.

=== Football ===
The Queens Silver Knights team was a college football team representing Queens College from 1972 to 1974. The team gained approval in 1970 to begin play, but could not because of lack of funding. A team was approved for 1971, but no games were played. The team was disbanded in 1974 because of "mismanagement" by the head coach, Tony Cruz.

=== Softball ===
In the period from 1997 to 2003, the softball team posted a .640 winning percentage and won 30 or more games in a season three times. One of those 30 win seasons came in 1999 when the team won their first NYCAC tournament championship and earned their first NCAA bid. Two season later, third team All-American Cheryl Cosenzo helped lead the Lady Knights to their second NYCAC championship as well as an NCAA bid and in 2002 the team earned their third Northeast Regional bid in five years. The Knights rose back to prominence in 2015, winning the ECC Championship under Head Coach Amy Delmore. Queens would make appearances in the NCAA Tournament in 2014 & 2015.

=== Tennis ===
The women's tennis team has experienced 19 consecutive winning seasons. The team has won four conference championships, while its players have won a number of individual and doubles titles. In 2004 Dominika Bajuk was selected as NYCAC Player of the Year. The Lady Knights have also earned NCAA Division II post-season championship bids in 2002, 2003, 2004, and 2005; as well as in 1995 when, as hosts, they won their region. Marilyn Aschner, who became a professional tennis player, played for the school.

=== Track and field ===
The men's track and field team won back-to-back ECC Championships in 2013 and 2014. In May 2022, the college completed renovation on its running track and two soccer fields. The nearly $10 million project was paid for through a combination of state and city funding.
