= Regis College (Massachusetts) =

Catholic college in Weston, Massachusetts, US

- Type: Private university
- Established: 1927; 99 years ago
- Founder: Sisters of St. Joseph
- Religious affiliation: Roman Catholic (Sisters of St. Joseph)
- Academic affiliations: ACCU CIC; AICUM; ACSSJ
- Endowment: $41.6 million (2020)
- President: Robin L. Cautin
- Students: 2,517 (fall 2024)
- Undergraduates: 987
- Postgraduates: 1,530
- Location: Weston, Massachusetts, United States; 42°21′2″N 71°18′33″W
- Campus: Suburban 132 acres (53 ha)
- Colors: Crimson and gold
- Nickname: Pride
- Sporting affiliations: NCAA Division III – GNAC
- Mascots: Lion and lioness
- Website: regiscollege.edu
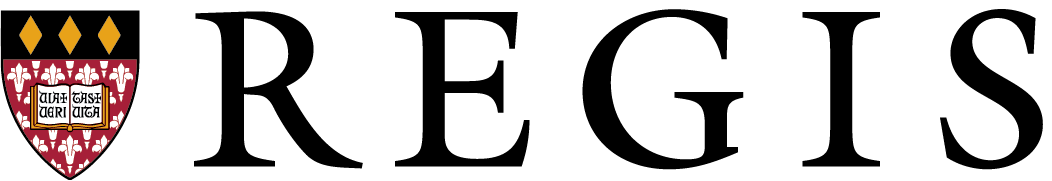

Regis College is a private Catholic university run by the Sisters of St. Joseph in Weston, Massachusetts, United States. Regis was founded as a women's college in 1927. In 2007, Regis became co-educational; it was the last Catholic women's college in the Boston area to start admitting men.

== History ==
Regis College was founded in 1927 by the Sisters of St. Joseph. The college's name is inspired by Mary Regis Casserly who established the Sisters of St. Joseph in Boston in 1873. After eight decades as a women's only college, Regis enrolled its first co-educational class in fall 2007.

As of fall 2020, approximately 3,000 undergraduate and graduate students were enrolled at Regis. As of 2020, the school had an 9 to 1 student/faculty ratio. Ninety-seven percent of the Class of 2019 had professional employment or were enrolled in graduate school within six months of graduation.

== Projects and programs ==
The Center for Global Connections oversees academic and service-learning initiatives for students. The Regis Haiti Project is an international faculty partnership initiative to help elevate Haitian nursing education and empower Haitian nursing faculty through the master's degree to teach others across Haiti.

Regis offers an accredited pre-school and kindergarten program at its Children's Center. The program teaches children from the age of 15 months to six years old about science, math, engineering, and technology.

In 2005, Regis founded a Life Long Learning Program (LLARC) that offers courses taught by volunteers to older adults at the Regis College in Weston campus.

== Academics ==
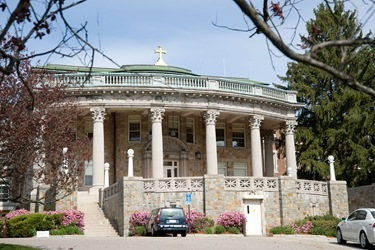
College Hall

Regis currently offers degrees and certificates within four schools and one division: The Richard and Sheila Young School of Nursing, the School of Health Sciences, School of Arts and Sciences, the Sloane School of Business and Communication, and the Theresa Wood Lavine Division of Professional Studies. Specific Degree designations that can be obtained through the attendance of Regis include: A.S.N., B.S.N, B.A., B.S., B.S.W., M.A.T., M.S., M.S.N., D.N.P, M.A., Ed.D. as well as both undergraduate and graduate certificates.

Regis College has cross-registration privileges with Babson, Bentley, Brandeis University, and Boston College as well as a cooperative degree program with Worcester Polytechnic Institute. Regis is affiliated with the Sisters of Saint Joseph College Consortium, University College Cork in Ireland, and Kyoto Notre Dame University in Kyoto, Japan for study abroad, as well as American University’s Washington Semester program.

Regis offers 27 undergraduate academic programs, 28 graduate and doctoral programs, and 29 minors.

The Richard and Sheila Young School of Nursing is designated as a Center of Excellence in Nursing Education by the National League of Nursing. The school offers undergraduate, graduate, and doctoral programs in Nursing with multiple tracks. The School of Nursing offers a Doctor of Nursing Practice (DNP), fully online Master of Science in Health Administration, a Master of Science in Nursing programs.

== Student life ==
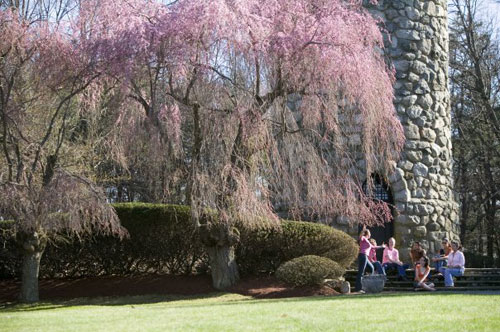
Norman Tower at Regis College

On-campus housing is guaranteed for all undergraduates in one of five residence halls: Angela Hall, Maria Hall, Domitilla Hall, St. Joseph Hall, and College Hall. Living on campus helps undergraduate students to experience Regis furthermore than the classroom setting. The Student Center houses the Undergraduate Admissions Office, Main Dining Hall, Tower Tavern, WRGS (the Regis College radio station), the bookstore, a post office, and several lounge areas for meetings or events. The Fine Arts Center houses the Eleanor Welch Casey Theatre and the Carney Art Gallery. The campus also features a Science Center, the Spellman Museum of Stamps & Postal History, and a Fitness Center housing: dance studios, weight and cardiovascular equipment, basketball courts, a swimming pool, and newly designed athletic fields.

There are currently over 25 clubs and organizations in which students may become involved, meet new people and stay active. Students are also free to start their own clubs on campus with help and may petition funding from the college.

In 2009, Regis College underwent construction of its new athletic fields, consisting of a turf field surface for field hockey, lacrosse, and soccer. An eight-lane track surface was constructed around the fields, along with six new tennis courts, and softball diamond with lights. Within the athletic building are the gymnasium, a first class athletic training room, and the pool. The Mary Carr Simone Fitness Center, which holds Cybex equipment, six flat screen HD televisions, and 11 pieces of cardio equipment, can also be found inside the building.

Phase I of a campus development master plan, featuring a new four-story residence hall, quad at the campus core, and a renovated library entrance was completed in summer 2015.

== Athletics ==
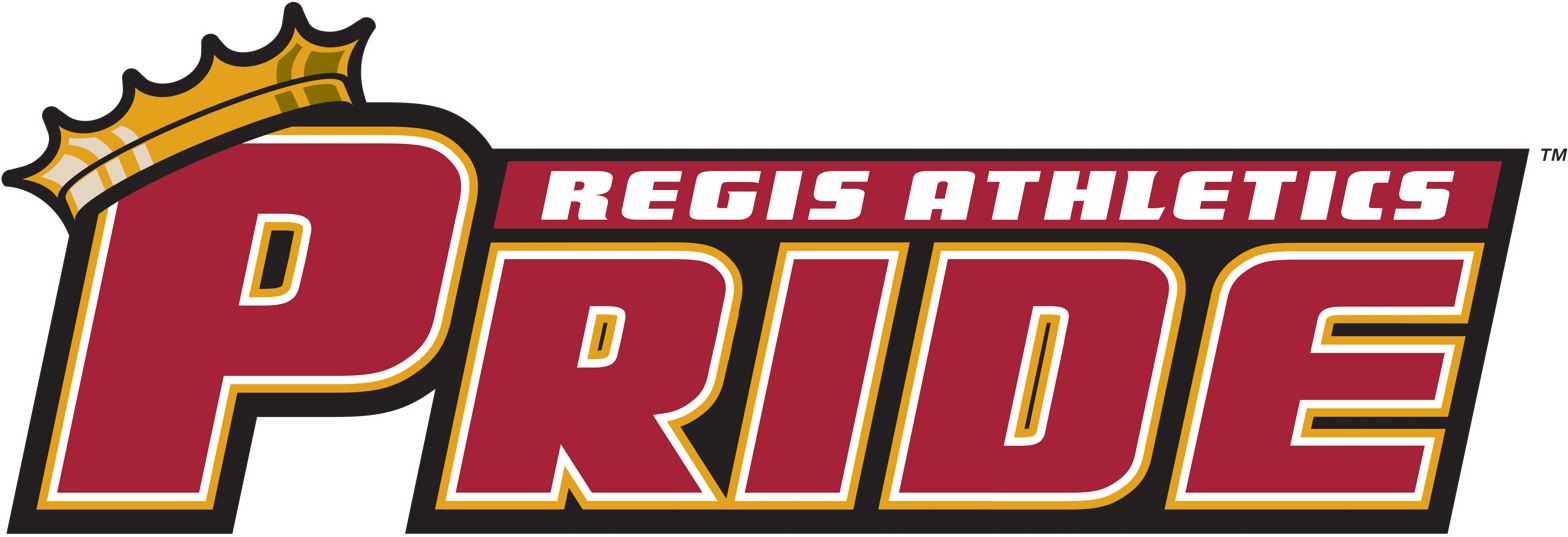
Regis athletics logo

Regis College teams (nicknamed Pride) participate as a member of the National Collegiate Athletic Association's Division III. The Pride are a member of the Great Northeast Athletic Conference (GNAC), which they started competing in for the fall 2017 season. Regis was formerly a member of the Commonwealth Coast Conference (CCC) between the 1988–89 and the 2010–11 seasons and the New England Collegiate Conference (NECC) between the 2011–12 and the 2016–2017 seasons.

Men's sports include basketball, lacrosse, soccer, swimming & diving, tennis, track & field and volleyball; while women's sports include basketball, field hockey, lacrosse, soccer, softball, swimming & diving, tennis, track & field and volleyball. In 2015, The Pride won NECC Championships in Women's Volleyball, Men's and Women's Swimming and Diving, Men's and Women's Tennis, Women's Field Hockey, Men's and Women's Basketball and Women's Lacrosse.
