= Metropolitan Swimming Conference =

Intercollegiate swimming conference

The Metropolitan Swimming Conference (METS) is one of the largest intercollegiate swimming and diving conferences in the United States. It includes NCAA division I, II, & III teams from the New York metropolitan region. Teams compete at an annual three day conference championship held at Rutgers University, New Brunswick, New Jersey in February. For the men, The College of New Jersey has captured the last 8 conference titles from 2007 through 2014. The LIU Post women have captured the previous two titles in 2013 and 2014.

== Affiliated university teams ==
=== Current members ===
Institution	Location	Nickname	Men	Women	Primary Conference	Division
Baruch College	Manhattan, New York	Bearcats	✓	✓	CUNYAC	D-III
Hunter College	Manhattan, New York	Hawks		✓	CUNYAC	D-III
Kean University	Union, New Jersey	Cougars		✓	NJAC	D-III
State University of New York Maritime College	Throggs Neck, New York	Privateers	✓	✓	Skyline	D-III
University of Mary Washington	Fredericksburg, Virginia	Eagles	✓	✓	C2C	D-III
United States Merchant Marine Academy	Kings Point, New York	Mariners	✓	✓	Skyline	D-III
Montclair State University	Montclair, New Jersey	Red Hawks	✓	✓	NJAC	D-III
Mount Saint Mary College	Newburgh, New York	Knights	✓	✓	Skyline	D-III
The College of New Jersey	Ewing, New Jersey	Lions	✓	✓	NJAC	D-III
Queens College	Flushing, New York	Knights		✓	ECC	D-II
Ramapo College	Mahwah, New Jersey	Roadrunners	✓	✓	NJAC	D-III
Roberts Wesleyan College	Chili, New York	Readhawks	✓	✓	ECC	D-II
Rowan University	Glassboro, New Jersey	Profs	✓	✓	NJAC	D-III
Salisbury University	Salisbury, Maryland	Seagulls	✓	✓	C2C	D-III
Sarah Lawrence College	Yonkers, New York	Gryphons	✓	✓	Skyline	D-III
College of Staten Island	Staten Island, New York	Dolphins	✓	✓	ECC	D-II (Note: The college began transition to Division II and the East Coast Conference in 2019. CSI will be a provisional D-II member through the 2021–22 academic year.)
William Paterson University	Wayne, New Jersey	Pioneers	✓	✓	NJAC	D-III

=== Former members ===
Institution	Location	Nickname	Men	Women	Current Swimming Conference	Primary Conference	Division
Adelphi University	Garden City, New York	Panthers	✓	✓	NE-10	NE-10	D-II
University of Bridgeport	Bridgeport, Connecticut	Purple Knights	✓	✓	Discontinued	ECC	D-II
Lehman College	The Bronx, New York	Lightning	✓	✓	CUNYAC	CUNYAC	D-II
Long Island University–Post	Brookville, New York	Pioneers		✓	NEC	NEC	D-I
New Jersey Institute of Technology	Newark, New Jersey	Highlanders	✓		America East	America East	D-I
Pace University	Pleasantville, New York	Setters	✓	✓	NE-10	NE-10	D-II
St. Francis College	Brooklyn, New York	Terriers	✓		NEC	NEC	D-I
The College of Saint Rose	Albany, New York	Golden Knights	✓	✓	NE-10	NE-10	D-II
Southern Connecticut State University	New Haven, Connecticut	Fighting Owls	✓	✓	NE-10	NE-10	D-II

== See also ==
- List of college athletic conferences in the United States
