= City University of New York Athletic Conference =

American college athletic conference

- Association: NCAA & NJCAA
- Founded: 1978 (informal), 1987 (charter)
- Commissioner: Kurt Patberg
- Sports fielded: 16; men's: 8; women's: 8
- Division: Division III
- No. of teams: 8 (NCAA-DIII); 6 (NJCAA)
- Headquarters: Flushing, New York
- Region: New York City
- Website: cunyathletics.com

Locations
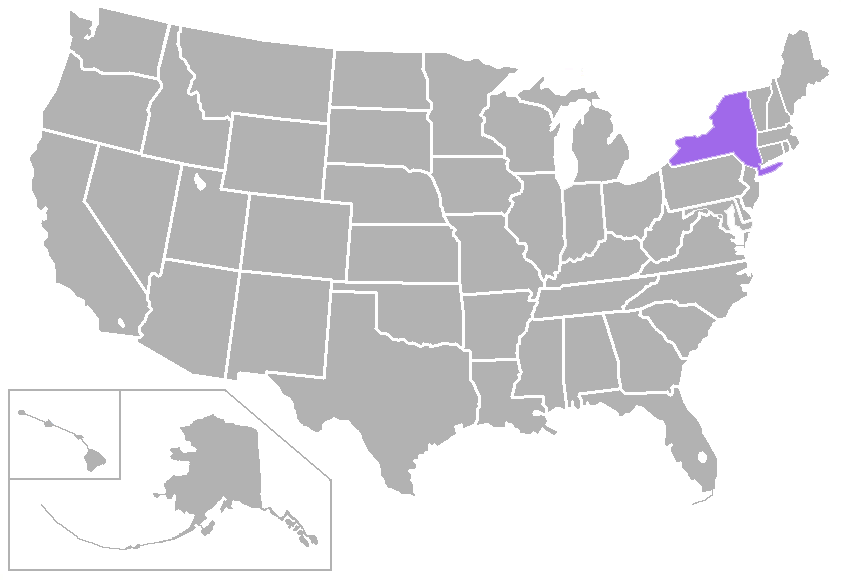

The City University of New York Athletic Conference (CUNY Athletic Conference or CUNYAC) is an intercollegiate athletic conference affiliated with the NCAA's Division III. Its member institutions are all located in New York City and are campuses of the City University of New York. The CUNYAC also has a community college division, affiliated with the National Junior College Athletic Association (NJCAA).

== History ==
Current members
– college division members
– community college division
– future college division members

=== Recent additions ===
On April 16, 2025, New Jersey City University announced it would return to the CUNYAC, first as a men's volleyball affiliate beginning in the 2026 spring season (2025–26 academic year), followed by multi-sport affiliation beginning in the 2026–27 academic year, and finally full membership beginning in the 2027–28 academic year, becoming the first full member outside of the City University of New York system. In CUNYAC's official announcement, the conference stated that NJCU was "the first of several" new members. NJCU's official announcement stated that it expected to "become a founding member of a new reconstituted, relaunched, and rebranded league for an anticipated start on July 1, 2027." However, NJCU later announced they would instead merge with Kean University following the 2025–26 academic year, greatly downsizing their athletic department and seeking affiliation outside of the NCAA in the process.

On February 25, 2026, the CUNYAC announced that Pratt Institute would join the CUNYAC beginning in the 2027–28 academic year, taking NJCU's place as the first new member in the relaunched league. One month later, the CUNYAC announced that Saint Elizabeth University would also join the rebranded CUNYAC in the 2027–28 academic year as well.

=== Chronological timeline ===
==== NCAA Division III (Senior college division) ====
- 1978 – The CUNYAC was founded as the CUNY Athletic Directions Association (CUNYADA). Charter members included Baruch College, Brooklyn College, the City College of New York (CCNY), Hunter College, John Jay College of Criminal Justice, Lehman College, Medgar Evers College, Queens College, the College of Staten Island and York College, beginning the 1978–79 academic year.
- 1980 – Two institutions left the CUNYAC to join their respective new home primary conferences, both effective after the 1979–80 academic year:
  - Brooklyn to join the Division I ranks of the National Collegiate Athletic Association (NCAA) as an NCAA D-I Independent
  - and Queens to join the NCAA Division II ranks as an NCAA D-II Independent
- 1987 – The CUNYADA has rebranded as the City University of New York Athletic Conference (CUNYAC) in the 1987–88 academic year.
- 1996 – Brooklyn rejoined the CUNYAC in the 1996–97 academic year.
- 1999 – New York City College of Technology (New York City Tech) joined the senior college ranks of the CUNYAC in the 1999–2000 academic year.
- 2003 – New Jersey City University (NJCU) joined the CUNYAC as an affiliate member for baseball in the 2004 spring season (2003–04 academic year).
- 2004 – New Jersey City (NJCU) left the CUNYAC as an affiliate member for baseball after the 2004 spring season (2003–04 academic year).
- 2011 – New York City Tech left the CUNYAC to put its athletic program on hiatus after the 2010–11 academic year.
- 2015 – The University of Maine at Presque Isle (Maine–Presque Isle or UMPI) joined the CUNYAC as an affiliate member for baseball during the 2016 spring season (2015–16 academic year).
- 2017 – Finlandia University joined the CUNYAC as an affiliate member for baseball in the 2018 spring season (2017–18 academic year).
- 2018 – Finlandia and Maine–Presque Isle (UMPI) left the CUNYAC as affiliate members for baseball after the 2018 spring season (2017–18 academic year).
- 2019 – Staten Island left the CUNYAC to join the NCAA Division II ranks and the East Coast Conference (ECC) after the 2018–19 academic year.
- 2025 – New Jersey City (NJCU) joined the CUNYAC as an affiliate member for men's volleyball, beginning in the 2026 spring season (2025–26 academic year).
- 2026 – New Jersey City (NJCU) left the CUNYAC as an affiliate member for men's volleyball after the 2026 spring season (2025–26 academic year).
- 2027 – Pratt Institute and Saint Elizabeth University will both join the CUNYAC beginning in the 2027–28 academic year; thus becoming the first full members outside of the City University of New York System.

==== NJCAA (Community college division) ====
- 1987 – The community college division of the CUNYAC was founded. Charter members included Bronx Community College, the Borough of Manhattan Community College, Kingsborough Community College, the New York City College of Technology (New York City Tech) and Queensborough Community College, beginning the 1987–88 academic year.
- 1999 – New York City Tech left the community college division of the CUNYAC to join the Division III ranks of the National Collegiate Athletic Association (NCAA) and the senior college division of the CUNYAC after the 1998–99 academic year.
- 2002 – Hostos Community College joined the community college division of the CUNYAC in the 2002–03 academic year.
- 2013 – LaGuardia Community College joined the community college division of the CUNYAC in the 2002–03 academic year.
- 2017 – LaGuardia left the community college division of the CUNYAC to put its athletic program on hiatus after the 2016–17 academic year.
- 2022 – LaGuardia rejoined the community college division of the CUNYAC in the 2022–23 academic year.

== Member schools ==
=== NCAA Division III (Senior college division) ===
==== Current members ====
The senior college division of the CUNYAC currently has eight full members, all public schools.

Institution	Location (Note: All locations are within New York City.)	Founded	Affiliation	Enrollment	Nickname	Colors	Joined (Note: Represents the calendar year when fall sports competition begins.)
Baruch College	Manhattan	1919	Public (Note: Part of the City University of New York System.)	20,081	Bearcats		1978
Brooklyn College	Brooklyn	1930	Public	14,390	Bulldogs		1978; 1996 (Note: Brooklyn left the CUNYAC after the 1979–80 school year, before rejoining in the 1996–97 school year.)
City College of New York	Manhattan	1847	Public	15,544	Beavers		1978
Hunter College	Manhattan	1870	Public	22,538	Hawks		1978
John Jay College of Criminal Justice	Manhattan	1964	Public	13,763	Bloodhounds		1978
Lehman College	The Bronx	1968	Public	13,324	Lightning		1978
Medgar Evers College	Brooklyn	1970	Public	3,736	Cougars		1978
York College	Queens	1966	Public	6,174	Cardinals		1978

==== Future members ====
The senior college division of the CUNYAC will have two new full members, both private schools (and also the conference's first members outside the CUNY system).

Institution	Location	Founded	Affiliation	Enrollment	Nickname	Colors	Joining (Note: Represents the calendar year when fall sports competition begins.)	Current conference
Pratt Institute	Brooklyn, New York	1887	Nonsectarian	5,356	Cannoneers		2027	Atlantic East (AEC)
Saint Elizabeth University	Morristown, New Jersey	1899	Catholic (Sisters of Charity)	1,200	Eagles		2027	Atlantic East (AEC)

==== Former members ====
The senior college division of the CUNYAC had three former full members, all were public schools:

Institution	Location (Note: All locations are within New York City.)	Founded	Affiliation	Nickname	Joined (Note: Represents the calendar year when fall sports competition begins.)	Left (Note: Represents the calendar year when spring sports competition ends.)	Current conference
New York City College of Technology	Brooklyn	1946	Public (Note: Part of the City University of New York System.)	Yellow Jackets	1999	2011	None (Note: New York City Tech's athletics program is on hiatus.)
Queens College	Queens	1937	Public	Knights	1978	1980	East Coast (ECC) (Note: Currently an NCAA Division II athletic conference.)
College of Staten Island	Staten Island	1976	Public	Dolphins	1978	2019	East Coast (ECC)

==== Former associate members ====
The senior college division of the CUNYAC has three former associate members, two of them were public schools.

Institution	Location	Founded	Affiliation	Nickname	Joined (Note: Represents the calendar year when fall sports competition begins.)	Left (Note: Represents the calendar year when spring sports competition ends.)	CUNYAC sport(s)	Current primary conference	Current conference in former CUNYAC sport(s)
Finlandia University	Hancock, Michigan	1896	Lutheran (ELCA)	Lions	2017	2018	baseball	Closed in 2023	
University of Maine at Presque Isle (UMPI)	Presque Isle, Maine	1903	Public	Owls	2015 (Note: Maine–Presque Isle (UMPI) joined the CUNYAC in baseball prior to the 2016 conference tournament (2015–16 school year). It played its first full regular-season conference schedule during the 2017 spring season (2016–17 school year).)	2018	baseball	North Atlantic (NAC) (Note: During their tenure as an affiliate member of the CUNYAC, UMPI's primary home conference was being an NCAA D-III Independent for 2015–16 and 2016–17, and in the American Collegiate Athletic Association during the 2017–18 school year.)	
New Jersey City University (Note: Currently known as Kean Jersey City since 2026.)(NJCU)	Jersey City, New Jersey	1929	Public	Gothic Knights	2003	2004	baseball	USCAA Independent (Note: Prior to its merger with Kean University, New Jersey City (NJCU) was initially planning to join the CUNYAC as a full member, effective fall 2027; however, since the merger, they were rebranded as Kean–Jersey City, thus leaving the NCAA Division III ranks and moved to the United States Collegiate Athletic Association (USCAA).)	
New Jersey City University (NJCU)	Jersey City, New Jersey	1929	Public	Gothic Knights	2025	2026	men's volleyball	USCAA Independent	

==== Membership timeline ====
Full member (all sports) Full member (non-football) Associate member (football) Associate member (sport)

=== NJCAA (community college division) ===
==== Current members ====
The community college division of the CUNYAC currently has six full members, all are public schools:

Institution	Location (Note: All locations are within New York City.)	Founded	Affiliation	Enrollment	Nickname	Joined (Note: Represents the calendar year when fall sports competition begins.)
Bronx Community College	The Bronx	1957	Public (Note: Part of the City University of New York System.)	6,787	Broncos	1987
Borough of Manhattan Community College	Manhattan	1963	Public	20,123	Panthers	1987
Hostos Community College	The Bronx	1968	Public	5,478	Caimans	2002
Kingsborough Community College	Brooklyn	1963	Public	18,165	Wave	1987
LaGuardia Community College	Queens	1968	Public	14,494	Red Hawks	2022 (Note: LaGuardia was part of the conference between 2013–14 and 2016–17 and then it put their athletic program on hiatus but they returned in the 2022–23 school year.)
Queensborough Community College	Queens	1959	Public	10,337	Tigers	1987

==== Former members ====
The community college division of the CUNYAC had two former full members, both were public schools:

Institution	Location (Note: All locations are within New York City.)	Founded	Affiliation	Nickname	Joined (Note: Represents the calendar year when fall sports competition begins.)	Left (Note: Represents the calendar year when spring sports competition ends.)	Current conference
New York City College of Technology	Brooklyn	1946	Public (Note: Part of the City University of New York System.)	Yellow Jackets	1987	1999	None (Note: New York City Tech's athletic program is currently on hiatus.)

==== Membership timeline ====
Full member (all sports) Full member (non-football) Associate member (football) Associate member (sport)

== Sports ==
=== NCAA Division III ===
The CUNYAC sponsors Division III intercollegiate athletic competition in men's baseball, men's and women's basketball, men's and women's cross country, men's and women's soccer, women's softball, men's and women's swimming and diving, men's and women's tennis, men's and women's track and field, and men's and women's volleyball.

==== Men's sports ====
School	Baseball	Basketball	Cross country	Soccer	Swimming & Diving	Tennis	Track & Field (Indoor)	Track & Field (Outdoor)	Volleyball	Total
Baruch	✓	✓	✓	✓	✓	✓	✗	✗	✓	7
Brooklyn	✗	✓	✓	✓	✓	✓	✗	✗	✓	6
CCNY	✓	✓	✓	✓	✗	✓	✓	✓	✓	8
Hunter	✗	✓	✓	✓	✗	✓	✓	✓	✓	7
John Jay	✓	✓	✓	✓	✗	✓	✗	✗	✓	6
Lehman	✓	✓	✓	✓	✓	✓	✓	✓	✓	9
Medgar Evers	✗	✓	✓	✓	✗	✗	✓	✓	✓	6
York (NY)	✗	✓	✓	✓	✓	✓	✓	✓	✓	8

===== Men's varsity sports not sponsored by the CUNYAC that are played by CUNYAC schools =====
School	Fencing	Rifle	Wrestling
Hunter	MACFA	✗	IND
John Jay	✗	MARC	✗

==== Women's sports ====
School	Basketball	Cross country	Soccer	Softball	Swimming & Diving	Tennis	Track & Field (Indoor)	Track & Field (Outdoor)	Volleyball	Total
Baruch	✓	✓	✗	✓	✓	✓	✗	✗	✓	6
Brooklyn	✓	✓	✓	✓	✓	✓	✗	✗	✓	7
CCNY	✓	✓	✓	✗	✗	✗	✓	✓	✓	6
Hunter	✓	✓	✗	✓	✓	✓	✓	✓	✓	8
John Jay	✓	✓	✓	✓	✓	✓	✗	✗	✓	7
Lehman	✓	✓	✓	✓	✓	✓	✓	✓	✓	9
Medgar Evers	✓	✓	✓	✗	✗	✗	✓	✓	✓	6
York (NY)	✓	✓	✓	✓	✓	✓	✓	✓	✓	9

===== Women's varsity sports not sponsored by the CUNYAC that are played by CUNYAC schools =====
School	Fencing	Rifle
CCNY	EWFC	✗
Hunter	NIWFA	✗
John Jay	✗	MARC

=== Community college ===
The CUNYAC sponsors community college (NJCAA) intercollegiate athletic competition in men's baseball, men's and women's basketball, men's soccer, and women's volleyball.
