= List of NCAA men's volleyball programs =

This is a list of colleges and universities with National Collegiate Athletic Association (NCAA)–sanctioned men's indoor volleyball teams that compete for either the NCAA men's volleyball tournament or the NCAA Division III men's volleyball tournament.

== Structure ==
The competition structure of men's volleyball dramatically differs from that of most sports sponsored by the NCAA. In most sports, teams are divided into three divisions:

- Division I, generally consisting of large or specialized universities that devote the most resources to athletics; these schools offer substantial numbers of athletic scholarships to attract team members (with a few voluntary exceptions, most notably the Ivy League).
- Division II, generally consisting of smaller institutions; these schools are also allowed to offer athletic scholarships, but in substantially smaller numbers.
- Division III, generally consisting of smaller schools and a few large institutions that prefer to focus on academics; schools in this group are not allowed to offer athletic scholarships

Before the 2011–12 school year (2012 championship), men's volleyball did not have an official divisional structure; even now, that structure is truncated. The National Collegiate Championship remains as the NCAA's top-level championship, but Division III members now have their own championship, officially known as the NCAA Division III Men's Volleyball Championship.

With the introduction of an official Division III championship, schools in that division are no longer eligible for the National Collegiate Championship. The last exception, Rutgers–Newark, had been a grandfathered scholarship program in men's volleyball and could compete for the National Collegiate Championship through the 2014 edition. After that season, Rutgers–Newark completed a transition to D-III men's volleyball.

This structure differs from that of the NCAA Women's Volleyball Championship, in which separate tournaments are conducted for all three divisions, mainly because there are far more NCAA member schools offering women's volleyball than the men's game. All schools that sponsor men's volleyball and are members of either Division I or II are allowed to offer financial aid for the sport that is equivalent to a maximum of 4.5 full scholarships.

Before the creation of the NCAA Division III championship in 2012, an unofficial men's volleyball championship tournament was conducted that was open only to Division III men's volleyball programs. For sponsorship reasons, it was known as the "Molten Division III Men's Invitational Volleyball Championship Tournament (Final Four)". Though it never occurred, an NCAA Division III school could, before 2012, qualify for the at-large bid to the National Collegiate Championship. Only NCAA Division III teams from the EIVA were able to earn an automatic bid.

Historically, there have been three general regions for men's volleyball: "West", "Mid-West", and "East". Before the Big West Conference became the first Division I all-sports conference to sponsor men's volleyball in the 2017–18 school year (2018 season), each region was represented by one "major" conference (defined here as a league that includes full Division I member schools)—respectively the Mountain Pacific Sports Federation (MPSF), Midwestern Intercollegiate Volleyball Association (MIVA), and Eastern Intercollegiate Volleyball Association (EIVA).

The East Region is also represented by Conference Carolinas, a Division II all-sports conference that was the first all-sports league in either Division I or II to sponsor men's volleyball. It received an automatic berth in the National Collegiate Championship for the first time in 2014, when the championship expanded from four teams to six.

When the Big West established its men's volleyball league, it took six teams from the MPSF men's volleyball league—half of that conference's pre-2017 men's volleyball membership. However, because the MPSF retained six teams, it kept its automatic NCAA bid, and soon announced it would add two more teams for the 2018 season. With pre-split member California Baptist dropping the sport after the 2017 season, plus the addition of Menlo and Vanguard for the 2025 season, the MPSF now has nine teams. Two conferences from the "West" now earn bids.

The Southern Intercollegiate Athletic Conference (SIAC), a Division II league made up almost exclusively of historically black colleges and universities (HBCUs), originally planned to start men's volleyball competition in the 2021 season with six members, all HBCUs. COVID-19 issues led the SIAC to delay the start of men's volleyball play to the 2022 season, by which time the conference had lost one of its intended six programs but added a replacement. The SIAC has since expanded to seven men's volleyball members, all HBCUs, with the addition of a new program at full conference member LeMoyne–Owen College for the 2025 season. The conference contracted back to six before the next season when LeMoyne–Owen relinquished the sport.

More recently, the Division I Northeast Conference, now officially known by its abbreviation of NEC, announced that it would start men's volleyball competition in the 2023 season, making it the second D-I all-sports conference to sponsor men's volleyball. The NEC initially announced that its new league would feature six programs, all representing full NEC members. Fairleigh Dickinson and LIU started competition in the 2022 season as independents; transitional D-I member Merrimack would start a new varsity program in 2023; and Sacred Heart, St. Francis Brooklyn, and Saint Francis (PA) moved from the EIVA. The EIVA retained six members and with it its automatic NCAA tournament bid. Shortly after the end of the 2022 season, the NEC announced that two D-II schools that had previously played as independents, Daemen and D'Youville (the latter then a transitional D-II member), would become single-sport NEC associates.

In May 2023, the Division II East Coast Conference announced it would add men's volleyball and play its first season in 2024. Full members Roberts Wesleyan and St. Thomas Aquinas were joined by associates American International and Dominican (NY). Alliance had been announced as an associate member, but the university closed immediately before the start of the 2023–24 school year. All of the inaugural ECC men's volleyball members started new men's volleyball programs except for American International, which competed as an independent in 2023. Mercy, a full ECC member, will add men's volleyball in the 2027 season to bring that sport's membership to five.

Another Division II conference, the Great Lakes Valley Conference (GLVC), added men's volleyball for the 2026 season. Five full GLVC members played men's volleyball in the 2024 season, with Lewis, McKendree, and Quincy in the MIVA and Maryville and Missouri S&T as independents. Rockhurst became the sixth GLVC member to sponsor the sport in the 2025 season, and Southwest Baptist became the seventh in the 2026 season. Lewis and McKendree remain in the MIVA, with the other full GLVC members being joined by former independents Rockhurst and Thomas More plus transitional Division II member Jamestown. Thomas More would drop men's volleyball after the first GLVC season.

In Division III, the conference alignment radically changed with the creation of that division's NCAA championship. Before the 2012 season, the majority of the Division III schools with men's volleyball programs were members of the North East Collegiate Volleyball Association (NECVA). Other Division III schools were members of other leagues, among them the New England Collegiate Conference (NECC), and the Eastern College Athletic Conference (ECAC). Teams from the ECAC were members of the NECVA. After the NCAA announced the creation of the D-III championship, the NECVA disbanded after the 2011 season. Two all-sports conferences whose men's volleyball programs had previously formed NECVA divisions—the CUNY Athletic Conference and Great Northeast Athletic Conference—began officially sponsoring the sport. Two other D-III all sports conferences, the United East Conference (then known as the North Eastern Athletic Conference) and Skyline Conference, also started sponsoring men's volleyball. The volleyball-only United Volleyball Conference was founded in 2010 in advance of the establishment of the NCAA D-III championship; another volleyball-only circuit, the Continental Volleyball Conference (CVC), was formed the following year. In 2014, the CVC amicably split along regional lines, with the Eastern members retaining the conference name (plus their automatic bid to the D-III championship) and the Midwestern members forming the new Midwest Collegiate Volleyball League. The Allegheny Mountain Collegiate Conference (AMCC), Middle Atlantic Conference, and Northern Athletics Collegiate Conference all began sponsoring men's volleyball in the 2018 season. The New Jersey Athletic Conference added the sport in the 2019 season, but did not sponsor it beyond that season after all of its men's volleyball members moved that sport to other leagues. The College Conference of Illinois and Wisconsin and Colonial States Athletic Conference started men's volleyball competition in the 2020 season; the latter conference would merge with the United East Conference after the 2023 season, with the merged league operating under the United East banner. The Old Dominion Athletic Conference and Presidents' Athletic Conference added men's volleyball in the 2024–25 season. Four conferences added the sport in 2026–27—the Conference of New England (CNE), Empire 8, (Note: The Empire 8 had treated men's volleyball as a conference sport, but its members had competed in single-sport leagues, with a conference champion extrapolated from results of matches involving two E8 teams. This is similar to the current relationship between the Division I Ivy League and ECAC Hockey in men's and women's ice hockey.) Landmark Conference, and New England Women's and Men's Athletic Conference (NEWMAC). CNE, the Empire 8, and NEWMAC coordinated these additions with the New England Volleyball Conference (an offshoot of the aforementioned NECC) and the UVC, both of which disbanded. The only NECC or UVC member that did not join any of the other three conferences is Hobart, which became an affiliate of the AMCC.

Members of the National Association of Intercollegiate Athletics (NAIA), a separate athletics governing body whose members are primarily smaller institutions, regularly play matches against NCAA teams.

Because of the historic lack of an official divisional structure in men's volleyball, four of the five major conferences have member schools that normally participate in NCAA Division II. This was also true for the other major conference until the 2021 season. Alignments listed here reflect those in place for the next 2027 season.

- The 11-member MPSF men's volleyball league consists of six Division I schools; full Division II members Concordia–Irvine, Jessup, and Vanguard; and schools transitioning from the NAIA to Division II in Menlo and UC Merced. Division I member Grand Canyon left the MPSF after the 2025 season, downgrading men's volleyball from varsity to club status. Pacific, an MPSF men's volleyball member from 1993 until dropping the sport after the 2014 season, reinstated its program starting with the 2027 season.
- The nine members of the MIVA consist of seven full Division I members and two Division II members in Lewis and McKendree. Both schools remain in MIVA men's volleyball despite their full-time home of the Great Lakes Valley Conference (GLVC) starting men's volleyball competition in the 2026 season. A third GLVC member, Quincy, left the MIVA after the 2025 season for the new GLVC league. Quincy was replaced in the MIVA by Northern Kentucky, which played its first men's volleyball season in 2026.
- The 7-member EIVA consists entirely of D-I members save for one Division II school, namely Charleston (WV). Through the 2014 season, the EIVA included Rutgers–Newark, the only remaining Division III school competing for the National Collegiate Championship, until that school completed its transition to Division III men's volleyball after that season.
- The Big West, the first Division I all-sports conference to sponsor men's volleyball, launched its league with six teams—five full conference members plus D-II UC San Diego. With UCSD having started a transition to D-I in July 2020 and becoming an all-sports Big West member (and since becoming a full D-I member in 2024), the Big West is the only major men's volleyball conference consisting entirely of D-I members.
- The NEC's originally announced lineup for its first men's volleyball season in 2023 featured only D-I members (including transitional member Merrimack). Before the NEC league began play, it expanded from 6 to 8 with the addition of D-II members Daemen and D'Youville. It dropped to 7 members after the 2023 season when full D-I member St. Francis Brooklyn eliminated its entire athletic program, and dropped further to 5 with Sacred Heart returning to the EIVA and Merrimack becoming independent. It returned to 7 members in the 2026 season with the arrival of new associates Manhattan and UMES. The lineup for the 2027 season remains at 7 with the return of Merrimack and the departure of Saint Francis (PA) for Division III.

The sizes of the conferences have fluctuated over the years as new men's volleyball programs arise and other programs are dropped from their schools. The creation of the men's Division III national championship led to several D-III schools leaving the EIVA.

Through 2013, each of the three major conferences of that day (MPSF, MIVA, and EIVA) received an automatic bid to the Final Four with one additional at-large bid. The remaining bid was an at-large bid that could be awarded to any team in Division I or II (which included Rutgers–Newark through the 2014 season). With Conference Carolinas receiving its first automatic berth in the 2014 season, the tournament expanded to six teams—the four conference champions, plus two at-large teams. The top two seeds received byes into the Final Four and the remaining four teams played for places in the Final Four. The tournament expanded further to seven teams for the 2018 season, coinciding with the Big West adding men's volleyball. The Big West receives an automatic bid, and two at-large teams continue to earn tournament entries. The 2018 National Collegiate tournament introduced a "play-in" match involving the two lowest seeds in the field; from that point, the tournament format was identical to the one used from 2014 to 2017. In 2024, the tournament expanded to eight teams, coinciding with the SIAC receiving its first automatic bid. All teams now participate at a single site in a pure knockout format. Generally, the best teams not receiving an automatic bid (usually from one of the now four major conferences - the fourth now being the Big West) receive the at-large bids. In 2026 it was announced by the AVCA that the tournament would expand to 12 teams for the 2026 tournament. For the 2026 and 2027 tournaments, there are seven automatic bids and five at-large bids, with the former growing to eight and the latter shrinking to four for the 2028 season. This is due to the automatic bid the GLVC will begin receiving that season.

== Current programs ==
All affiliations are current for the upcoming 2027 NCAA men's volleyball season; teams starting play in 2027 are presumed to be independent unless declared otherwise. All years listed refer to men's volleyball seasons; since NCAA men's volleyball is a spring sport, any team listed as joining a new conference in the future will actually join in the calendar year before beginning competition in the new league. Similarly, any school listed as dropping the sport in the future will do so in the same calendar year as its final season of competition.

=== National Collegiate (Divisions I & II) programs ===
School (Branded or known as)	Location	Nickname	Conference	NCAA bids	First	Latest	National titles
University of California, Los Angeles (UCLA)	Los Angeles, CA	Bruins	MPSF	32	1970	2026	1970, 1971, 1972, 1974, 1975, 1976, 1979, 1981, 1982, 1983, 1984, 1987, 1989, 1993, 1995, 1996, 1998, 2000, 2006, 2023, 2024
University of Southern California (USC/SC/Southern Cal)	Los Angeles, CA	Trojans	MPSF	16	1977	2026	1977, 1980, 1988, 1990
Pepperdine University	Malibu, CA (Note: While the mailing address is Malibu, the campus is in unincorporated Los Angeles County.)	Waves	MPSF	19^{+}	1976	2026	1978, 1985, 1986, 1992, 2005
Brigham Young University (BYU)	Provo, UT	Cougars	MPSF	10	1999	2021	1999, 2001, 2004
Menlo College (transitioning to Division II)	Atherton, CA	Oaks	MPSF	0	—	—	
University of the Pacific	Stockton, CA	Tigers	MPSF	0	—	—	
Stanford University	Stanford, CA	Cardinal	MPSF	5	1989	2014	1997, 2010
Concordia University Irvine (Division II) (Concordia Irvine)	Irvine, CA	Eagles	MPSF	0	—	—	
Vanguard University (Division II)	Costa Mesa, CA	Lions	MPSF	0	—	—	
Jessup University (Division II)	Rocklin, CA	Warriors	MPSF	0	—	—	
University of California, Merced (UC Merced) (Division II)	Merced, CA	Golden Bobcats	MPSF	0	—	—	
California State University, Long Beach (Long Beach State)	Long Beach, CA	The Beach	Big West	16	1970	2026	1991, 2018, 2019, 2025
University of Hawaiʻi at Mānoa (Hawaii)	Honolulu, HI	Rainbow Warriors	Big West	^{10+}	1995	2026	2002 (Vacated), 2021, 2022, 2026
University of California, Irvine (UC Irvine)	Irvine, CA	Anteaters	Big West	9	2006	2026	2007, 2009, 2012, 2013
University of California, San Diego (UC San Diego)	La Jolla, San Diego, CA	Tritons	Big West	0	—	—	(Molten DIII 2000)
University of California, Santa Barbara (UC Santa Barbara/UCSB)	Isla Vista, CA (Note: Mailing address is Santa Barbara.)	Gauchos	Big West	8	1970	2021	
California State University, Northridge (CSUN/Cal State Northridge)	Northridge, Los Angeles, CA	Matadors	Big West	2	1993	2010	
Loyola University Chicago (Loyola Chicago)	Chicago, IL	Ramblers	MIVA	5	2013	2026	2014, 2015
McKendree University (Division II)	Lebanon, IL	Bearcats	MIVA	0	—	—	
Ohio State University	Columbus, OH	Buckeyes	MIVA	23	1975	2024	2011, 2016, 2017
Lewis University (Division II)	Romeoville, IL	Flyers	MIVA	8^{+}	1996	2021	2003 (Vacated)
Ball State University	Muncie, IN	Cardinals	MIVA	17	1970	2026	
Lindenwood University	St. Charles, MO	Lions	MIVA	0	—	—	
Purdue University Fort Wayne	Fort Wayne, IN	Mastodons	MIVA	6	1991	2007	
Queens University of Charlotte [Queens (NC)]	Charlotte, NC	Royals	MIVA	0	—	—	
Northern Kentucky University	Highland Heights, KY	Norse	MIVA	0	—	—	
Pennsylvania State University (Penn State)	University Park, PA	Nittany Lions	EIVA	36	1981	2026	1994, 2008
University of Charleston (Division II)	Charleston, WV	Golden Eagles	EIVA	0	—	—	
New Jersey Institute of Technology (NJIT)	Newark, NJ	Highlanders	EIVA	0	—	—	
Harvard University	Cambridge, MA (Note: Harvard's academic administration and undergraduate campus are in Cambridge. Its athletic department offices and most of its athletic venues are within the Boston city limits and have a Boston mailing address, but the volleyball venue is in Cambridge.)	Crimson	EIVA	1	2018	2018	
Sacred Heart University	Fairfield, CT	Pioneers	EIVA	0	—	—	
Princeton University	Princeton, NJ	Tigers	EIVA	3	1998	2022	—
George Mason University (GMU or Mason)	George Mason, VA (Note: Mailing address is Fairfax.)	Patriots	EIVA	4	1984	2016	
Belmont Abbey College (Division II)	Belmont, NC	Crusaders	Carolinas	4	2021	2026	
Erskine College (Division II)	Due West, SC	Flying Fleet	Carolinas	2	2014	2016	
Barton College (Division II)	Wilson, NC	Bulldogs	Carolinas	2	2017	2019	
King University (Division II)	Bristol, TN	Tornado	Carolinas	2	2018	2023	
University of Mount Olive (Division II)	Mount Olive, NC	Trojans	Carolinas	0	—	—	
Lees–McRae College (Division II)	Banner Elk, NC	Bobcats	Carolinas	0	—	—	
Emmanuel University (Division II)	Franklin Springs, GA	Lions	Carolinas	0	—	—	
North Greenville University (Division II)	Tigerville, SC	Crusaders	Carolinas	1	2022	2022	
Missouri University of Science and Technology (Missouri S&T) (Division II)	Rolla, MO	Miners	GLVC	0	–	–	
Roosevelt University (in transition to Division II)	Chicago, IL	Lakers	GLVC	0	—	—	
Rockhurst University (Division II)	Kansas City, MO	Hawks	GLVC	0	—	—	
University of Jamestown (transitioning to Division II)	Jamestown, ND	Jimmies	GLVC	0	—	—	
Maryville University (Division II)	Town and Country, MO (Note: Mailing address is St. Louis.)	Saints	GLVC	0	—	—	
Quincy University (Division II)	Quincy, IL	Hawks	GLVC	0	—	—	
Southwest Baptist University (Division II)	Bolivar, MO	Bearcats	GLVC	0	—	—	
University of Maryland Eastern Shore (UMES)	Princess Anne, MD (Note: UMES has a Princess Anne mailing address, but is in unincorporated Somerset County.)	Hawks	NEC	0	—	—	
Long Island University (LIU)	Brooklyn, NY (Note: LIU has two primary campuses, one in Brooklyn and the other in Brookville, New York. Men's volleyball operates from Brooklyn. All LIU sports are open to undergraduates at both campuses who meet NCAA eligibility requirements.)	Sharks	NEC	0	—	—	
Manhattan University	Riverdale, NY	Jaspers	NEC	0	—	—	
D'Youville University (Division II)	Buffalo, NY	Saints	NEC	0	—	—	
Fairleigh Dickinson University (FDU)	Teaneck, NJ	Knights	NEC	0	—	—	
Daemen University (Division II)	Amherst, NY	Wildcats	NEC	1	2025	2025	
Merrimack College	North Andover, MA	Warriors	NEC	0	—	—	
Dominican University [Dominican (NY); Division II]	Orangeburg, NY	Chargers	ECC	0	—	—	
Roberts Wesleyan University (Division II)	Rochester, NY	Redhawks	ECC	0	—	—	
Mercy University	Dobbs Ferry, NY	Mavericks	ECC	0	—	—	
St. Thomas Aquinas College (Division II)	Sparkill, NY	Spartans	ECC	0	—	—	
American International College (Division II)	Springfield, MA	Yellow Jackets	ECC	0	—	—	
Edward Waters University (Division II)	Jacksonville, FL	Tigers	SIAC	0	—	—	
Benedict College (Division II)	Columbia, SC	Tigers	SIAC	0	—	—	
Central State University (Division II)	Wilberforce, OH	Marauders	SIAC	0	—	—	
Fort Valley State University (Division II)	Fort Valley, GA	Wildcats	SIAC	3	2024	2026	
Kentucky State University (Division II)	Frankfort, KY	Thorobreds	SIAC	0	—	—	
Morehouse College (Division II) (program on hiatus)	Atlanta, GA	Maroon Tigers	SIAC	0	—	—	
Barry University (Division II)	Miami Shores, FL	Buccaneers	Independent	0	—	—	
Catawba College (Division II)	Salisbury, NC	Indians	Independent	0	—	—	
Lincoln Memorial University (Division II)	Harrogate, TN	Railsplitters	Independent	0	—	—	
Newberry College (Division II)	Newberry, SC	Wolves	Independent	0	—	—	
University of Puerto Rico at Bayamón (Division II) (UPRB/UPR-Bayamón)	Bayamón, PR	Cowboys	Independent	0	—	—	
University of Puerto Rico at Mayagüez (Division II) (UPRM/RUM)	Mayagüez, PR	Tarzans	Independent	0	—	—	
University of Puerto Rico, Río Piedras (Division II) (UPR-RP/La IUPI)	San Juan, PR	Gallitos	Independent	0	—	—	
Tusculum University (Division II)	Tusculum, TN (Note: Mailing address is Greeneville.)	Pioneers	Independent	0	—	—	

^{+}=1 bid vacated by NCAA

=== Division III programs ===
School	Location	Nickname	Conference	NCAA bids	First	Latest	National titles
Buffalo State University	Buffalo, NY	Bengals	AMCC	2	2025	2026	
Carlow University	Pittsburgh, PA	Celtics	AMCC	0	—	—	
Hilbert College	Hamburg, NY	Hawks	AMCC	0	—	—	
Hobart College	Geneva, NY	Statesmen	AMCC	0	—	—	
Mount Aloysius College	Cresson, PA	Mounties	AMCC	0	—	—	
Penn State Altoona	Logan Township, PA (Note: Mailing address is Altoona.)	Nittany Lions	AMCC	1	2017	2017	
Penn State Erie, The Behrend College (Penn State Behrend)	Erie, PA	Lions	AMCC	1	2022	2022	
Baruch College	Manhattan, New York, NY (Note: The mailing address for all locations in Manhattan is "New York".)	Bearcats	CUNY AC	9	2012	2025	
Brooklyn College	Brooklyn, New York, NY	Bulldogs	CUNY AC	0	—	—	
City College of New York (CCNY)	Manhattan, New York, NY	Beavers	CUNY AC	0	—	—	
Hunter College	Manhattan, New York, NY	Hawks	CUNY AC	4	2012	2018	
John Jay College of Criminal Justice (John Jay)	Manhattan, New York, NY	Bloodhounds	CUNY AC	0	—	—	
Lehman College	The Bronx, New York, NY	Lightning Bugs	CUNY AC	0	—	—	
Medgar Evers College	Brooklyn, New York, NY	Cougars	CUNY AC	0	—	—	
York College	Queens, New York, NY	Cardinals	CUNY AC	0	—	—	
Augustana College (IL)	Rock Island, IL	Vikings	CCIW	0	—	—	
Carthage College	Kenosha, WI	Firebirds	CCIW	10	2012	2026	2021, 2022
Illinois Wesleyan University	Bloomington, IL	Titans	CCIW	0	—	—	
Loras College	Dubuque, IA	Duhawks	CCIW	2	2024	2026	
North Central College	Naperville, IL	Cardinals	CCIW	2	2022	2023	
North Park University	Chicago, IL	Vikings	CCIW	0	—	—	
Bard College	Annandale-on-Hudson, NY	Raptors	CNE	0	—	—	
Curry College	Milton, MA	Colonels	CNE	0	—	—	
Endicott College	Beverly, MA	Gulls	CNE	9	2013	2026	
Nichols College	Dudley, MA	Bison	CNE	2	2024	2025	
State University of New York at Potsdam (Potsdam/SUNY Potsdam)	Potsdam, NY	Bears	CNE	0	—	—	
Vermont State University–Johnson (VSU Johnson)	Johnson, VT	Badgers	CNE	0	—	—	
Wentworth Institute of Technology	Boston, MA	Leopards	CNE	8	2016	2026	
Regent University (transitioning to Division III)	Virginia Beach, VA	Royals	CVC	0	—	—	
Rutgers University–Newark (Division I 1970–2013)	Newark, NJ	Scarlet Raiders	CVC	3 (Div. I-5)	2015 (DI-1977)	2022 (DI-1990)	
Southern Virginia University	Buena Vista, VA	Knights	CVC	7	2019	2026	2025
Warren Wilson College	Swannanoa, NC	Owls	CVC	0	—	—	
William Peace University	Raleigh, NC	Pacers	CVC	0	—	—	
Elmira College	Elmira, NY	Soaring Eagles	Empire 8	0	—	—	
Hartwick College	Oneonta, NY	Hawks	Empire 8	0	—	—	
Houghton University	Houghton, NY	Highlanders	Empire 8	0	—	—	
Nazareth University	Pittsford, NY	Golden Flyers	Empire 8	3	2013	2015	(Molten DIII 2011)
Russell Sage College	Albany, NY	Gators	Empire 8	0	—	—	
St. John Fisher University	Rochester, NY	Cardinals	Empire 8	2	2022	2023	
State University of New York Polytechnic Institute (SUNY Polytechnic Institute/SUNY Poly)	Marcy, NY (Note: Mailing address is Utica.)	Wildcats	Empire 8	0	—	—	
Colby–Sawyer College	New London, NH	Chargers	GNAC	0	—	—	
Dean College	Franklin, MA	Bulldogs	GNAC	0	—	—	
College of Our Lady of the Elms (Elms)	Chicopee, MA	Blazers	GNAC	2	2012	2018	
Emmanuel College (MA)	Boston, MA	Saints	GNAC	0	—	—	
Lasell University	Newton, MA	Lasers	GNAC	1	2015	2015	
Regis College (MA)	Weston, MA	Pride	GNAC	0	—	—	
Rhode Island College	Providence, RI	Anchormen	GNAC	0	—	—	
Rivier University	Nashua, NH	Raiders	GNAC	5	2013	2019	
California Lutheran University (Cal Lutheran)	Thousand Oaks, CA	Kingsmen	Independent	3	2024	2026	2024
Greenville University	Greenville, IL	Panthers	Independent	0	—	—	
Johnson & Wales University (transitioning to Division III)	Charlotte, NC	Wildcats	Independent	0	—	—	
Maranatha Baptist University	Watertown, WI	Sabercats	Independent	0	—	—	
Simpson College	Indianola, IA	Storm	Independent	0	—	—	
University of California, Santa Cruz (UC Santa Cruz)	Santa Cruz, CA	Banana Slugs	Independent	5	2012	2023	
Westminster College	Fulton, MO	Blue Jays	Independent	0	—	—	
University of Wisconsin–Stevens Point	Stevens Point, WI	Pointers	Independent	0	—	—	
Drew University	Madison, NJ	Rangers	Landmark	0	—	—	
Elizabethtown College	Elizabethtown, PA	Blue Jays	Landmark	0	—	—	
Juniata College	Huntingdon, PA	Eagles	Landmark	7	2012	2026	(Molten DIII 1998, 2004, '05, '06, '07, '09)
Kean University	Union & Hillside, NJ	Cougars	Landmark	7	2012	2018	
Lycoming College	Williamsport, PA	Warriors	Landmark	0	—	—	
Ramapo College	Mahwah, NJ	Roadrunners	Landmark	0	—	—	
University of Scranton	Scranton, PA	Royals	Landmark	0	—	—	
Wilkes University	Wilkes-Barre, PA	Colonels	Landmark	0	—	—	
Alvernia University	Reading, PA	Crusaders	MAC	0	—	—	
Arcadia University	Glenside, PA	Knights	MAC	1	2019	2019	
Eastern University	St. Davids, PA	Eagles	MAC	0	—	—	
Hood College	Frederick, MD	Blazers	MAC	0	—	—	
King's College	Wilkes-Barre, PA	Monarchs	MAC	0	—	—	
Messiah University	Mechanicsburg, PA	Falcons	MAC	4	2021	2026	
Misericordia University	Dallas, PA	Cougars	MAC	0	—	—	
Neumann University	Aston, PA	Knights	MAC	0	—	—	
Stevens Institute of Technology (Stevens)	Hoboken, NJ	Ducks	MAC	12	2013	2026	2015, 2023
Stevenson University	Baltimore County, MD	Mustangs	MAC	2	2016	2018	
Widener University	Chester, PA	Pride	MAC	0	—	—	
Adrian College	Adrian, MI	Bulldogs	MCVL	0	—	—	
Baldwin Wallace University	Berea, OH	Yellow Jackets	MCVL	1	2023	2023	
Calvin University	Grand Rapids, MI	Knights	MCVL	0	—	—	
Franklin College	Franklin, IN	Grizzlies	MCVL	0	—	—	
Mount St. Joseph University	Delhi Township, OH (Note: Mailing address is Cincinnati.)	Lions	MCVL	0	—	—	
University of Mount Union	Alliance, OH	Purple Raiders	MCVL	2	2022	2025	
University of Olivet	Olivet, MI	Comets	MCVL	0	—	—	
Spalding University	Louisville, KY	Golden Eagles	MCVL	0	—	—	
Trine University	Angola, IN	Thunder	MCVL	1	2024	2024	
Wabash College	Crawfordsville, IN	Little Giants	MCVL	0	—	—	
Wittenberg University	Springfield, OH	Tigers	MCVL	1	2026	2026	
Aurora University	Aurora, IL	Spartans	NACC	1	2025	2025	
Benedictine University	Lisle, IL	Eagles	NACC	2	2021	2023	
Concordia University Chicago	Chicago, IL	Cougars	NACC	0	—	—	
Concordia University Wisconsin	Mequon, WI	Falcons	NACC	0	—	—	
Dominican University (IL)	River Forest, IL	Stars	NACC	6	2017	2026	
Edgewood University	Madison, WI	Eagles	NACC	0	—	—	
Illinois Institute of Technology (IIT/Illinois Tech)	Chicago, IL	Scarlet Hawks	NACC	0	—	—	
Lake Forest College	Lake Forest, IL	Foresters	NACC	0	—	—	
Lakeland University	Howards Grove, WI	Muskies	NACC	0	—	—	
Marian University (WI)	Fond du Lac, WI	Sabres	NACC	0	—	—	
Milwaukee School of Engineering (MSOE)	Milwaukee, WI	Raiders	NACC	1	2019	2019	
Rockford University	Rockford, IL	Regents	NACC	0	—	—	
St. Norbert College	De Pere, WI	Green Knights	NACC	0	—	—	
Wisconsin Lutheran College	Milwaukee, WI	Warriors	NACC	0	—	—	
Emerson College	Boston, MA	Lions	NEWMAC	0	—	—	
Massachusetts Institute of Technology (MIT)	Cambridge, MA	Engineers	NEWMAC	2	2014	2026	
State University of New York at New Paltz (SUNY New Paltz/New Paltz)	New Paltz, NY	Hawks	NEWMAC	7	2014	2026	2016, 2019
New York University (NYU)	Manhattan, New York, NY	Violets	NEWMAC	4	2017	2026	
Springfield College (MA)	Springfield, MA	Pride	NEWMAC	13	2012	2026	2012, 2013, 2014, 2017, 2018, 2026 (Molten DIII 1997, 2001, '02, '03, '08, '10)
Vassar College	Poughkeepsie, NY	Brewers	NEWMAC	6	2017	2025	
Wheaton College (MA)	Norton, MA	Lyons	NEWMAC	0	—	—	
Averett University	Danville, VA	Cougars	ODAC	0	—	—	
Batten University	Virginia Beach, VA	Marlins	ODAC	0	—	—	
Bridgewater College	Bridgewater, VA	Eagles	ODAC	0	—	—	
Eastern Mennonite University	Harrisonburg, VA	Royals	ODAC	0	—	—	
Randolph College	Lynchburg, VA	Wildcats	ODAC	0	—	—	
Randolph–Macon College	Ashland, VA	Yellow Jackets	ODAC	2	2025	2026	
Roanoke College	Salem, VA	Maroons	ODAC	0	—	—	
Shenandoah University	Winchester, VA	Hornets	ODAC	0	—	—	
Bethany College (WV)	Bethany, WV	Bison	PAC	0	—	—	
Chatham University	Pittsburgh, PA	Cougars	PAC	0	—	—	
Franciscan University of Steubenville (Franciscan)	Steubenville, OH	Barons	PAC	0	—	—	
Geneva College	Beaver Falls, PA	Golden Tornadoes	PAC	0	2023	2023	
Grove City College	Grove City, PA	Wolverines	PAC	0	—	—	
Hiram College	Hiram, OH	Terriers	PAC	2	2021	2024	
Saint Francis University (Note: Saint Francis, which previously played in the National Collegiate division, starts reclassification to Division III in July 2026.)	Loretto, PA	Red Wolves	PAC	0 (Note: Saint Francis played in the National Collegiate tournament in its final season at that level in 2026.)	—	—	
Saint Vincent College	Latrobe, PA	Bearcats	PAC	0	—	—	
Thiel College	Greenville, PA	Tomcats	PAC	2	2025	2026	
Washington & Jefferson College	Washington, PA	Presidents	PAC	0	—	—	
Manhattanville University	Purchase, NY	Valiants	Skyline	0	—	—	
University of Mount Saint Vincent	Bronx, New York, NY	Dolphins	Skyline	0	—	—	
St. Joseph's University-Brooklyn	Brooklyn, New York, NY	Bears	Skyline	0	—	—	
St. Joseph's University-Long Island	Patchogue, NY	Golden Eagles	Skyline	6	2018	2026	
Sarah Lawrence College	Eastchester, NY (Note: Mailing address is Bronxville.)	Gryphons	Skyline	0	—	—	
State University of New York at Old Westbury (SUNY Old Westbury/Old Westbury)	Old Westbury, NY	Panthers	Skyline	0	—	—	
State University of New York at Purchase (SUNY Purchase/Purchase College)	Purchase, NY	Panthers	Skyline	0	—	—	
Yeshiva University	Manhattan, New York, NY	Maccabees	Skyline	0	—	—	
Cairn University	Langhorne, PA	Highlanders	United East	0	—	—	
Centenary University	Hackettstown, NJ	Cyclones	United East	0	—	—	
Gallaudet University	Washington, DC	Bison	United East	0	—	—	
Gwynedd Mercy University	Gwynedd Valley, PA	Griffins	United East	0	—	—	
Immaculata University	Malvern, PA	Mighty Macs	United East	0	—	—	
Lancaster Bible College	Lancaster, PA	Chargers	United East	5	2018	2026	
Marymount University	Arlington, VA	Saints	United East	1	2022	2022	
Pratt Institute	Brooklyn, New York, NY	Cannoneers	United East	0	—	—	
Saint Elizabeth University	Morristown, NJ	Eagles	United East	0	—	—	
University of Valley Forge	Phoenixville, PA	Patriots	United East	0	—	—	
Wilson College (PA)	Chambersburg, PA	Phoenix	United East	0	—	—	

== Future programs ==
=== National Collegiate ===
School (Branded or known as)	Location	Nickname	Conference	Begins
Monroe University (transitioning to Division II)	New Rochelle, NY	Mustangs	Probably ECC	2028

=== Division III ===
School (Branded or known as)	Location	Nickname	Conference	Begins
John Carroll University	University Heights, OH	Blue Streaks	MCVL	2028
Lebanon Valley College	Annville, PA	Flying Dutchmen	MAC	2028
Lesley University	Cambridge, MA	Lynx	CNE	2028
University of Mary Washington	Fredericksburg, VA	Eagles	TBA	2028
University of Redlands	Redlands, CA	Bulldogs	TBA	2028
Eureka College	Eureka, IL	Red Devils	TBA	TBA (Note: According to Eureka's press release, "Although the program will initially compete at the club level, Eureka has plans to transition to NCAA competition in the coming years.")

== Defunct programs ==
=== National Collegiate ===
School (Branded or known as)	Location	Nickname	Conference at the time	Year cut	NCAA bids	First	Latest	National titles
San Diego State University (SDSU)	San Diego, CA	Aztecs	MPSF	2000	2	1972	1973	1973
California Baptist University (Cal Baptist, CBU)	Riverside, CA	Lancers	MPSF	2017	0	—	—	
Loyola Marymount University (LMU)	Los Angeles, CA	Lions	MPSF	2000	0	—	—	
Grand Canyon University (GCU)	Phoenix, AZ	Antelopes	MPSF	2025	2	2023	2025	
LeMoyne–Owen College (Division II)	Memphis, TN	Magicians	SIAC	2026	0	—	—	
Thomas More University (Division II)	Crestview Hills, KY	Saints	GLVC	2026	0	—	—	

=== Division III ===
School (Branded or known as)	Location	Nickname	Conference at the time	Year cut	NCAA bids	First	Latest	National titles
University of Lynchburg	Lynchburg, VA	Hornets	ODAC	2026	0	—	—	

== See also ==
- NCAA men's volleyball tournament (National Collegiate division)
- NCAA Division III men's volleyball tournament
- NCAA Women's Volleyball Championship
- List of NCAA Division I women's volleyball programs
