= List of college athletics championship game outcomes =

The National Collegiate Athletic Association (NCAA), founded in 1906, is the major governing body for intercollegiate athletics in the United States and currently conducts national championships in its sponsored sports, except for the top level of football. Before the NCAA offered a championship for any particular sport, intercollegiate national championships in that sport were determined independently. Although the NCAA sometimes lists these historic championships in its official records, it has not awarded retroactive championship titles.

Prior to NCAA inception of a sport, intercollegiate championships were conducted and usually espoused in advance as competitions for the national championship. Many winners were recognized in contemporary newspapers and other publications as the "national intercollegiate" champions. These are not to be confused with the champions of early 20th-century single-sport alliances of northeastern U.S. colleges that were named "Intercollegiate League" or "Intercollegiate Association." These leagues generally included some of the colleges that later became the Ivy League, as well as an assortment of other northeastern universities.

Even after the NCAA began organizing national championships, some non-NCAA organizations conducted their own national championship tournaments, usually as a supplement to the NCAA events. A notable example is that of NCAA Division III men's volleyball. Although the NCAA Men's National Collegiate Volleyball Championship, established in 1970, was in theory open to D-III schools, none had received a berth in that tournament. As a result, a separate championship event, open only to D-III schools, was created in 1997. That event was discontinued after its 2011 edition once the NCAA announced it would sponsor an official Division III championship starting in 2012.

The historical championship event outcomes included in the primary list section were decided by actual games organized for the purpose of determining a champion on the field of play. Lists of other championships for collegiate athletic organizations are referenced in later sections (see Table of Contents). It does not include Helms Athletic Foundation or Premo-Porretta Power Poll selections, which were awarded retrospectively.

== Championship game outcomes prior/concurrent to NCAA inception ==
=== Men's teams ===
==== Baseball ====
- 1893 Yale def. Amherst, 9–0

Tournament was played at the Chicago World's Fair and included Virginia, Illinois, Wisconsin, Vanderbilt, Yale, Amherst, Wesleyan and Vermont. William McKinley attended the opening game. It was organized by the Columbian National Inter-Collegiate Baseball Association, notably by its secretary, Amos Alonzo Stagg, then the new head football coach at the University of Chicago.

NCAA from 1947.

==== Basketball ====
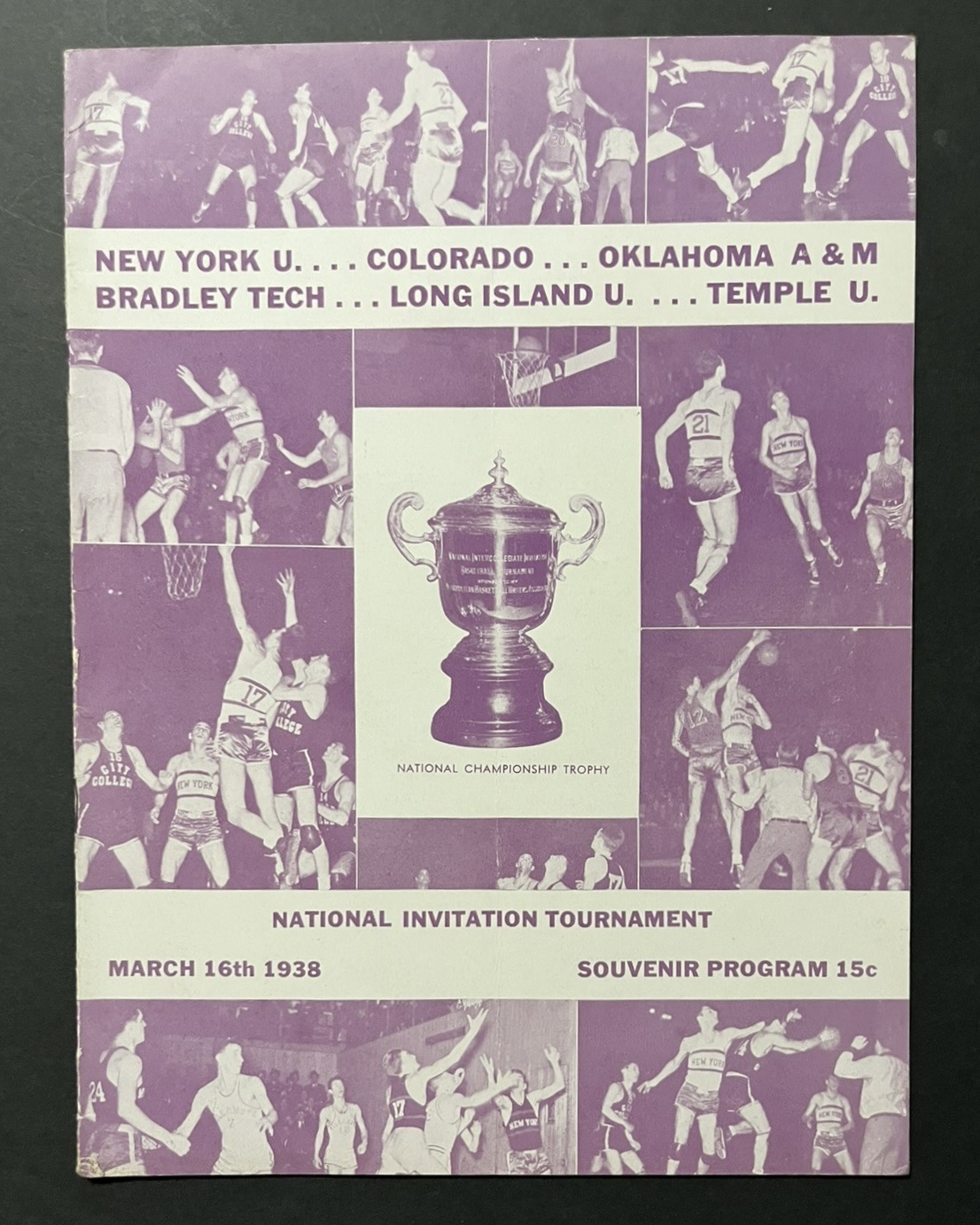
Souvenir program from the inaugural National Invitation Tournament showcasing the "National Championship Trophy" won by Temple in 1938.

- 1904 Hiram College won the 1904 Olympic Games collegiate championship tournament, def. Wheaton College, 25–20, and Latter-Day Saints University (later, Brigham Young University), 25–18.
- 1908 Chicago def. Pennsylvania, 2 games to 0 (21–18, 16–15)
- Amateur Athletic Union annual United States championship – College teams were runners-up in 1915, 1917, 1920, 1921, 1932, and 1934. Four college teams won the championship (final game results):

- 1916 Utah def. Illinois Athletic Club, 28–27
- 1920 New York University def. Rutgers, 49–24
- 1924 Butler (Indiana) def. Kansas City Athletic Club, 30–26
- 1925 Washburn College (Kansas) def. Hillyard Shine Alls, 42–30

- 1920 Pennsylvania def. Chicago, 2 games to 1 (24–28, 29–18, 23–21)
- 1922 Wabash College (Indiana) won the first national intercollegiate championship tournament, which was held in Indianapolis. Five 1922 conference champions and a runner-up from these conferences participated: Pacific Coast Conference, Southern Intercollegiate Athletic Association, Western Pennsylvania League, Illinois Intercollegiate Athletic Conference, Michigan Intercollegiate Athletic Association and Indiana Intercollegiate Athletic Association. The Western Conference and Eastern Intercollegiate League declined invitations to participate.
- 1935 LSU def. Pittsburgh, 41–37, in an intersectional "Rose Bowl" sponsored by the American Legion, played on April 13 at Convention Hall in Atlantic City.
- 1938 Temple def. Colorado, 60–36 in first National Invitation Tournament (NIT)

NCAA from 1939.

1939–1950 NIT winners:

- 1939 Long Island
- 1940 Colorado
- 1941 Long Island
- 1942 West Virginia
- 1943 St. John's
- 1944 St. John's
- 1945 DePaul
- 1946 Kentucky
- 1947 Utah
- 1948 Saint Louis
- 1949 San Francisco
- 1950 City College of New York (also won NCAA)
- 1954 Holy Cross claims a national championship for its 1954 NIT victory.
- 1943–1945 Red Cross War Benefit Games:

- 1943 Wyoming, winner of NCAA tournament, def. NIT champion, St. John's, 52-47 (OT)
- 1944 Utah, winner of NCAA tournament, def. NIT champion, St. John's, 43-36
- 1945 Oklahoma A&M, winner of NCAA tournament, def. NIT champion, DePaul, 52–44

- 1952 In the Olympic Trials held immediately after the tournaments, NCAA champion Kansas defeated NAIA champion Southwest Missouri State in the collegiate semi-finals and then NIT champion La Salle in the collegiate final. Kansas lost to the AAU champion Peoria Caterpillars in the overall final.

==== Boxing ====
- 1924 Penn State def. Navy, 18–16
- 1925 Navy def. Penn State, 23–11
- 1926 Navy def. Penn State, 15–13
- 1927 Penn State def. Navy, 22–21
- 1928 Navy def. Penn State, 19–18
- 1929 Penn State def. Navy, 23–13
- 1930 Penn State def. Western Maryland, 19–14
- 1931 Navy def. Western Maryland, 20–16

NCAA from 1932–1960.

==== Cross country ====
Inter-Collegiate Cross Country Association (1899–1907)
Inter-Collegiate Association of Amateur Athletes of America (1908–37)

- 1899 Cornell
- 1900 Cornell
- 1901 Yale
- 1902 Cornell
- 1903 Cornell
- 1904 Cornell
- 1905 Cornell
- 1906 Cornell
- 1907 Cornell
- 1908 Cornell
- 1909 Cornell
- 1910 Cornell
- 1911 Cornell
- 1912 Harvard
- 1913 Cornell
- 1914 Cornell
- 1915 Maine
- 1916 Cornell
- 1917 Pennsylvania
- 1918 not held
- 1919 Syracuse
- 1920 Cornell
- 1921 Cornell
- 1922 Syracuse
- 1923 Syracuse
- 1924 Pittsburgh
- 1925 Syracuse
- 1926 Penn State
- 1927 Penn State
- 1928 Penn State
- 1929 Pennsylvania
- 1930 Penn State
- 1931 Harvard
- 1932 Manhattan
- 1933 Michigan State
- 1934 Michigan State
- 1935 Michigan State
- 1936 Michigan State
- 1937 Michigan State

NCAA from 1938.

==== Fencing ====
Intercollegiate Fencing Association (1894–1943)

Team Foils

- 1894 Harvard
- 1895 Harvard
- 1896 Harvard
- 1897 Harvard
- 1898 Columbia
- 1899 Harvard
- 1900 Harvard
- 1901 Navy
- 1902 Army
- 1903 Army
- 1904 Army
- 1905 Navy
- 1906 Army
- 1907 Navy
- 1908 Army
- 1909 Army
- 1910 Navy
- 1911 Cornell
- 1912 Army
- 1913 Columbia
- 1914 Columbia
- 1915 Navy
- 1916 Navy
- 1917 Navy
- 1918 Columbia
- 1919 Columbia
- 1920 Navy
- 1921 Navy
- 1922 Navy

Three-Weapon Championship

- 1923 Army †
- 1924 Navy
- 1925 tie: Yale, Navy
- 1926 Yale
- 1927 Army
- 1928 Yale
- 1929 Yale
- 1930 tie: Yale, Army
- 1931 Army
- 1932 Yale
- 1933 New York Univ.
- 1934 Columbia
- 1935 New York Univ.
- 1936 New York Univ.
- 1937 New York Univ.
- 1938 New York Univ.
- 1939 Navy
- 1940 New York Univ.
- 1941 New York Univ.
- 1942 New York Univ.
- 1943 Navy
- 1944–47 not held

† The first IFA three-weapon trophy was awarded in 1923. However, all three weapons (foil, épée, saber) were contested in the IFA tournament as early as 1920.

NCAA 1941–42 and from 1947.

==== Football ====
The National Collegiate Athletic Association (NCAA) has never conducted a national championship event at the highest level of college football, currently its Division I Football Bowl Subdivision (FBS). Neither has the NCAA ever officially endorsed an FBS national champion. Since 1978, it has held a championship playoff at the next lower level of college play. Prior to 1978, no divisions separated teams, and champions were independently designated by "selectors," composed of individuals and third-party organizations using experts, polls, and mathematical methods. These efforts have continued and thrived for the higher FBS level. From the beginning, the selectors' choices have frequently been at odds with each other. The NCAA has documented both contemporaneous and retroactive choices of several major national selectors in its official NCAA Football Records Book. These selections are often claimed as championships by individual schools.

==== Golf ====
1897–1938

See Pre-NCAA college golf champions

NCAA from 1939.

==== Gymnastics ====
- 1899 No team title. Yale gymnasts won 4 out of 6 individual events, shared a tie for victory in one event and also won the individual all-around. 19 schools participated.
- 1900 Columbia def. 2nd place Yale, 26 – 17
- 1901 Yale def. 2nd place Columbia, 20 – 14
- 1902 Yale def. 2nd-place Columbia, 16 – 15

In 1903, the Western Conference instituted an annual conference championship meet. Although early interest was expressed by the Intercollegiate Association in establishing a recognized national championship event with the Western Conference, that interest did not reach fruition. In later years, the University of Chicago, a perennial Western Conference power, participated in several of the annual championship meets of the Intercollegiate Association.

- 1917 Chicago def. 2nd-place Haverford, 14½ – 10
- 1918 not held
- 1919 not held
- 1925 Navy def. Chicago, 33 – 12, in a dual meet between winners of the Intercollegiate and Western Conference championship meets.

"[I]n the twenty year period from 1910 to (the end of 1929) ... Navy has participated in 91 tournaments and dual meets and won 87 of them, including all seven of the intercollegiate championship events entered." (Those seven events were conference, not national, championships.) Navy was so strong that the Intercollegiate Association asked Navy not to participate in the 1926 championship meet. Navy was not a participant in the 1926, 1927 and 1928 meets.

- 1944 Penn State won the National AAU team title during a five-year hiatus in the NCAA championships for World War II.

NCAA from 1938.

==== Ice hockey ====
- Amateur Athletic Union conducted annual National Ice Hockey Championships during 1931–1948, except during most of the World War II years. College teams won the championship on at least two occasions:

- 1940 Minnesota def. Amesbury, 9–4, and Brock-Hall, 9–1
- 1942 Boston College def. High Standard H.C., 3–2, Massena H.C., 9–8, and defending champion St. Nicholas H.C., 6–4

NCAA from 1948.

==== Lacrosse ====
- 1881 Harvard def. Princeton, 3–0

The first intercollegiate lacrosse tournament was held in 1881 with Harvard beating Princeton in the championship game. New York University and Columbia University also participated. From 1882 through 1970 (excepting 1932–1935), the United States Intercollegiate Lacrosse Association and the collegiate lacrosse associations from which it evolved chose annual champions based on season records. These associations were the ILA (1882–1905), IULL (1899–1905), USILL (1906–1925) and USILA (1926–1970). In 1912 and 1921, the USILL conducted championship games between the winners of its Northern and Southern Divisions. Efforts to conduct such games in other years during its existence were unsuccessful.

- 1912 Harvard def. Swarthmore, 7–3
- 1921 Lehigh def. Syracuse, 3–1

NCAA from 1971.

==== Rifle ====
National Rifle Association

===== National Indoor Intercollegiate Match =====
1924–79

Men/Coed (year of conversion to Coed undetermined)

In the contemporary press, the type of competition utilized for this match was referred to as "shoulder-to-shoulder." This distinguished it from the "telegraphic" or "postal" form of competition.

- 1924 US Naval Academy
- 1925 US Naval Academy
- 1926 US Naval Academy
- 1927 George Washington
- 1928 * George Washington
- 1929 Iowa
- 1930 US Naval Academy
- 1931 US Naval Academy
- 1932 Cincinnati
- 1933 Minnesota
- 1934 US Naval Academy
- 1935 US Naval Academy
- 1936 Carnegie Institute of Tech. (PA)
- 1937 US Naval Academy
- 1938 George Washington
- 1939 US Naval Academy
- 1940 Iowa
- 1941 Minnesota
- 1942 US Military Academy
- 1943–45 No competition
- 1946 † Iowa
- 1947 Maryland
- 1948 US Naval Academy
- 1949 Maryland
- 1950 US Military Academy
- 1951 MIT
- 1952 California
- 1953 Maryland
- 1954 Maryland
- 1955 California
- 1956 Nevada-Reno
- 1957 California
- 1958 California
- 1959 California
- 1960 Oregon State
- 1961 West Virginia
- 1962 Oregon State
- 1963 The Citadel
- 1964 West Virginia
- 1965 US Military Academy
- 1966 West Virginia
- 1967 US Naval Academy
- 1968 tie: Murray State, Montana State
- 1969 US Naval Academy
- 1970 Murray State
- 1971 Tennessee Tech
- 1972 Tennessee Tech
- 1973 Tennessee Tech
- 1974 East Tennessee State
- 1975 US Military Academy
- 1976 Texas Christian
- 1977 Tennessee Tech
- 1978 Murray State
- 1979 Tennessee Tech

NCAA from 1980.

* The Intercollegiate Rifle Team Trophy was presented to the NRA by the Sons of the American Revolution in 1928, when it was first awarded for annual rifle competition.

† NRA document states that there was no competition in 1946.

===== NRA Intercollegiate League =====
1909–22

Competition was held in telegraphic form using the indoor ranges of each competing school.

- 1909 Washington State
- 1910 Washington State
- 1911 Iowa
- 1912 Massachusetts Agricultural
- 1913 West Virginia
- 1914 Michigan Agricultural
- 1915 Washington State
- 1916 Michigan Agricultural
- 1917 Michigan Agricultural
- 1918 Iowa
- 1919 Pennsylvania
- 1920 Norwich
- 1921 Norwich
- 1922 Pennsylvania

===== NRA Gallery Indoor Championship =====
1908 – ?

The indoor intercollegiate match was a single annual indoor match open to teams of any college. It was held in telegraphic form using the indoor ranges of each competing school.

- 1908 Columbia
- 1909 Washington State
- 1910 Massachusetts Agricultural
- 1911 Massachusetts Agricultural
- 1912–22 ?
- 1923 Georgetown
- 1924 George Washington
- 1925 Washington
- 1926 ?
- 1927 Norwich
- 1928
- 1929
- 1930
- 1931
- 1932 Washington
- 1933 Washington State
- 1934– ?
- end date unknown

===== National Outdoor Intercollegiate Match =====
1905 – ?

Matches were initially held at Sea Girt, New Jersey; after several years Camp Perry, Ohio, became the perennial venue.

(This competition is not to be confused with the National ROTC outdoor rifle team championship for the William Randolph Hearst Team Trophy (first awarded circa 1922), which was not open to all students.)

- 1905 Princeton
- 1906 George Washington
- 1907 not held
- 1908 George Washington
- 1909 George Washington
- 1910 Massachusetts Agricultural
- 1911
- 1912
- 1913 Massachusetts Agricultural
- 1914 Massachusetts Agricultural
- 1915 MIT
- 1916 Norwich
- 1917
- 1918
- 1919
- 1920
- 1921 US Naval Academy
- 1922 Univ. of Dayton
- 1923
- 1924 Columbia
- 1925– ?
- end date unknown

==== Skiing ====
1921–53

Beginning in 1921, an intercollegiate winter sports championship was held annually at Lake Placid, New York, and involved colleges from the US and Canada. It combined events from downhill and slalom skiing, cross-country skiing, and ski jumping, as well as speed skating, figure skating, and snowshoeing in some years. The overall winning team received the President Harding Trophy. Prior to the 1940s, in end-of-year accounts of national sporting champions, major newspapers regarded the winning team at Lake Placid as intercollegiate champion.

In the late 1930s, a major annual "four-way" (downhill, slalom, jumping and cross-country) intercollegiate event began in Sun Valley, Idaho. From the start it attracted not only college teams from the West, but also strong teams that traditionally participated in the Lake Placid meet, such as Dartmouth. After interruption by World War II, it usurped the older event.

Newspaper coverage referred to the 1946 and 1947 Sun Valley winners (Utah and Middlebury, respectively) as national champions. A few days earlier than the 1947 Sun Valley meet, a similar skiing competition was held in Aspen, Colorado, overlapping the start date of the Sun Valley event. In 1948 and 1949, Aspen, rather than Sun Valley, hosted the national "four-way" intercollegiate ski championships.

All of these competitions were held in the middle of the ski season rather than at the end. Then in 1950, an official annual post-season national championship event was established. This event served to influence the NCAA to add skiing as a sponsored sport, with the first NCAA title event occurring in 1954.

The Intercollegiate Ski Union (ISU), a conference of schools primarily in the Northeast, also conducted annual championship events for its members. However, its geographic reach was more limited than the other competitions described.

Lake Placid, New York

- 1921–22 Dartmouth
- 1922–23 Dartmouth
- 1923–24 Dartmouth
- 1924–25 Williams College
- 1925–26 tie: Wisconsin, New Hampshire
  (Wisconsin won tiebreaker.)
- 1926–27 New Hampshire
- 1927–28 Wisconsin
- 1928–29 New Hampshire
- 1929–30 Dartmouth
- 1930–31 Dartmouth
- 1931–32 New Hampshire
- 1932–33 New Hampshire †
- 1933–34 Dartmouth
- 1934–35 Dartmouth
- 1935–36 Dartmouth
- 1936–37 cancelled, lack of snow
- 1937–38 Dartmouth
- 1938–39 McGill Univ. (Montreal)
- 1939–40 Middlebury
- 1940–41 New Hampshire
- 1941–42 team point title not awarded ‡
- 1942–43 Middlebury
- 1943–44 Dartmouth #
- 1944–45 Dartmouth
- 1945–46 not held (housing difficulties)
- 1946–47 St. Lawrence Univ. (NY) §
- 1947–48 St. Lawrence Univ. (NY) §
- 1948–49 team point title not awarded ♦
- 1949–50 cancelled, lack of snow
- 1950–51 cancelled, not enough entries

† curtailed by bad weather (jump and snowshoe race held, last two events cancelled)
‡ lack of snow (cross-country and jump held, downhill and slalom cancelled)
# competition included non-collegians
♦ lack of snow (jump held, other events cancelled)
§ not regarded as national champion; included for completeness

Sun Valley, Idaho

- 1937–38 Dartmouth
- 1938–39 no apparent team title (individual only)
- 1939–40 Washington
- 1940–41 Washington
- 1941–42 Washington
- 1942–46 not held
- 1946–47 Utah
- 1947–48 Middlebury

Aspen, Colorado

- 1947–48 Western State (CO) §
- 1948–49 Middlebury
- 1949–50 Denver

Post-Season National Championship

- 1950 Dartmouth (venue: Arapahoe Basin, Colorado)
- 1951 Denver (venue: Mt. Hood, Oregon)
- 1952 Denver (venue: Snow Basin, Utah)
- 1953 Washington State (venue: Snow Basin, Utah)

NCAA from 1954.

==== Soccer ====
During the periods 1926–35 and 1946–58, annual champions were selected by collegiate soccer associations based on regular season records. All are considered unofficial. For the period of 1936–45, each year's outstanding teams claim unofficial national championships. See also Intercollegiate Soccer Football Association.

The Soccer Bowl (played in 1950–52) attempted to settle the national championship on the field for the 1949, 1950 and 1951 seasons. The Soccer Bowl championship games were played in January, 1950; January, 1951; and February, 1952, respectively.

- 1949 Penn State tied San Francisco, 2–2 (co-champs)
- 1950 Penn State def. Purdue, 3–1
- 1951 Temple def. San Francisco, 2–0

NCAA from 1959.

==== Tennis ====
1883–1945

See Collegiate individual tennis champions

NCAA from 1946.

==== Tennis (indoor) ====
Intercollegiate Tennis Association (1973– )

- 1929 Lehigh (PA)
- 1930 Lehigh
- 1931 Yale
- 1973 Stanford
- 1974 Not held
- 1975 Stanford
- 1976 Stanford
- 1977 Trinity (TX)
- 1978 Stanford
- 1979 SMU
- 1980 California
- 1981 Not held
- 1982 Pepperdine
- 1983 SMU
- 1984 UCLA
- 1985 Stanford
- 1986 Pepperdine
- 1987 Southern California
- 1988 Southern California
- 1989 California
- 1990 Stanford
- 1991 UCLA
- 1992 Stanford
- 1993 UCLA
- 1994 Stanford
- 1995 Stanford
- 1996 UCLA
- 1997 UCLA
- 1998 Stanford
- 1999 UCLA
- 2000 Stanford
- 2001 UCLA
- 2002 Stanford
- 2003 Illinois
- 2004 Illinois
- 2005 Baylor
- 2006 Georgia
- 2007 Georgia
- 2008 Virginia
- 2009 Virginia
- 2010 Virginia
- 2011 Virginia
- 2012 Southern California
- 2013 Virginia
- 2014 Ohio State
- 2015 Oklahoma
- 2016 North Carolina
- 2017 Virginia
- 2018 Wake Forest
- 2019 Ohio State
- 2020 Southern California
- 2021 North Carolina
- 2022 TCU
- 2023 TCU
- 2024 Ohio State
- 2025 Wake Forest

==== Track and field (indoor) ====
Amateur Athletic Union (1918)

Intercollegiate Association of Amateur Athletes of America (1923–64)

- 1918 Pennsylvania (Note: In 1943 and 1947, NYU also won the AAU national senior indoor track and field meet. Villanova did so in 1957, as did the University of Pennsylvania in 1918. These are the only occasions that a college team won this open AAU title prior to collegiate sponsorship of the sport by the NCAA.)
- 1923 Pennsylvania
- 1924 Pennsylvania
- 1925 Georgetown
- 1926 Harvard
- 1927 Harvard
- 1928 Cornell
- 1929 New York Univ.
- 1930 Cornell, Pennsylvania
- 1931 Pennsylvania
- 1932 New York Univ.
- 1933 Yale
- 1934 Manhattan
- 1935 Manhattan
- 1936 Manhattan
- 1937 Columbia
- 1938 Columbia
- 1939 Manhattan
- 1940 New York Univ.
- 1941 Fordham
- 1942 Penn State
- 1943 New York Univ.
- 1944 Army
- 1945 Army
- 1946 not held
- 1947 New York Univ.
- 1948 New York Univ.
- 1949 Michigan State
- 1950 Michigan State
- 1951 Manhattan
- 1952 Manhattan
- 1953 Manhattan
- 1954 Yale
- 1955 Manhattan
- 1956 Manhattan
- 1957 Villanova
- 1958 Villanova
- 1959 Penn State
- 1960 Villanova
- 1961 Yale
- 1962 Villanova
- 1963 Villanova
- 1964 Villanova

NCAA from 1965.

==== Track and field (outdoor) ====
Intercollegiate Association of Amateur Athletes of America (1876–1920)

- 1876 Princeton
- 1877 Columbia
- 1878 Columbia
- 1879 Columbia
- 1880 Harvard
- 1881 Harvard
- 1882 Harvard
- 1883 Harvard
- 1884 Harvard
- 1885 Harvard
- 1886 Harvard
- 1887 Yale
- 1888 Harvard
- 1889 Yale
- 1890 Harvard
- 1891 Harvard
- 1892 Harvard
- 1893 Yale
- 1894 Yale
- 1895 Yale
- 1896 Yale
- 1897 Pennsylvania
- 1898 Pennsylvania
- 1899 Pennsylvania
- 1900 Pennsylvania
- 1901 Harvard
- 1902 Yale
- 1903 Yale
- 1904 Yale *
- 1905 Cornell
- 1906 Cornell
- 1907 Pennsylvania
- 1908 Cornell
- 1909 Harvard
- 1910 Pennsylvania
- 1911 Cornell
- 1912 Pennsylvania
- 1913 Pennsylvania †
- 1914 Cornell
- 1915 Cornell
- 1916 Cornell
- 1917 not held
- 1918 Cornell
- 1919 Cornell
- 1920 Pennsylvania

* University of Chicago won the 1904 Olympic Games collegiate championship meet, defeating Princeton, Illinois, Michigan State and Colgate.

† A contemporary source states, as part of an "international athletic games" (similar to the Olympics) in Chicago on June 28 – July 6, 1913, "The national intercollegiate track and field meet was won by the University of Michigan," with Southern California second and Chicago third.

NCAA from 1921.

==== Trampoline ====
Until 1969, men's trampoline was one of the events that comprised the NCAA gymnastics championships. The NCAA continued to bestow a national title in trampoline for two years. For several years, there was an annual membership vote on whether to remove it as an NCAA competition, resulting in removal by 1971.

- 1969 Michigan
- 1970 Michigan

Discontinued after 1970.

==== Volleyball ====
United States Volleyball Association (1949–69)

- 1949 Southern California
- 1950 Southern California
- 1951 University of Mexico
- 1952 University of Mexico
- 1953 UCLA
- 1954 UCLA
- 1955 Florida State
- 1956 UCLA
- 1957 Florida State
- 1958 Florida State
- 1959 George Williams College (IL)
- 1960 George Williams College
- 1961 Santa Monica Community College
- 1962 Santa Monica Community College
- 1963 Santa Monica Community College
- 1964 Santa Monica Community College
- 1965 UCLA
- 1966 Santa Monica Community College
- 1967 UCLA
- 1968 San Diego State
- 1969 UC Santa Barbara

NCAA from 1970.

Molten Division III Men's Invitational Volleyball Championship Tournament (1997–2011)

This was a championship solely for NCAA Division III schools. It was discontinued after its 2011 edition when the NCAA announced it would organize an official Division III championship starting in 2012.

- 1997 Springfield
- 1998 Juniata
- 1999 La Verne
- 2000 UC San Diego
- 2001 Springfield
- 2002 Springfield
- 2003 Springfield
- 2004 Juniata
- 2005 Juniata
- 2006 Juniata
- 2007 Juniata
- 2008 Springfield
- 2009 Juniata
- 2010 Springfield
- 2011 Nazareth

NCAA from 2012.

==== Water polo ====
- 1913 Princeton 3, Illinois 1

NCAA from 1969.

==== Wrestling ====
- 1921 Penn State def. Indiana, 32–14, and Iowa Agricultural College, 28–18, in post-season dual meets among conference champions.

NCAA from 1928.

=== Women's teams ===
==== AIAW Champions in 16 NCAA Sports ====
See AIAW Champions for listings of pre-NCAA champions for most of the current NCAA women's sports.

==== Basketball ====
See DGWS/AIAW Basketball Champions (1969–82)

NCAA from 1982.

The Amateur Athletic Union (AAU) has since 1926 conducted United States championship tournaments for women's amateur teams. On 28 occasions, small college teams (all from the central U.S.) have won the AAU women's basketball championship:

- 1932–33 (2) Oklahoma Presbyterian College
- 1934–36 (3) Tulsa Business College
- 1950, 58, 60, 62–69 (11) Nashville Business College
- 1954–57, 59, 61, 70–71, 74–75 (10) Wayland Baptist College (Texas)
- 1972–73 (2) John F. Kennedy College (Nebraska)

==== Bowling ====
United States Bowling Congress (formerly American Bowling Congress and Women's Intercollegiate Bowling Congress)

Year and Champion	Year and Champion	Year and Champion	Year and Champion	Year and Champion	Year and Champion
1975 Wichita State	1984 Indiana State	1993 William Paterson (NJ)	2002 Morehead State	2011 Maryland Eastern Shore	2020 cancelled
1976 San Jose State	1985 West Texas State	1994 Wichita State	2003 Central Missouri State	2012 Webber International	2021 Wichita State
1977 Wichita State	1986 Wichita State	1995 Nebraska	2004 Pikeville (Kentucky)	2013 Maryland Eastern Shore	2022 Stephen F. Austin
1978 Wichita State	1987 West Texas State	1996 West Texas State	2005 Wichita State	2014 Robert Morris-Illinois	2023 McKendree
1979 Penn State	1988 West Texas State	1997 Nebraska	2006 Lindenwood (Missouri)	2015 North Carolina A&T	2024 Wichita State
1980 Erie Community College (NY)	1989 Morehead State (Kentucky)	1998 Morehead State	2007 Wichita State	2016 Webber International	2025 Jacksonville State (Alabama)
1981 Arizona State	1990 Wichita State	1999 Nebraska	2008 Pikeville	2017 McKendree (Illinois)	2026
1982 Erie Community College	1991 Nebraska	2000 Morehead State	2009 Wichita State	2018 Lindenwood	2027
1983 West Texas State	1992 West Texas State	2001 Nebraska	2010 Webber International (Florida)	2019 Robert Morris–Illinois	2028

The NCAA from 2004 has sponsored a women's team championship, apart from the USBC national championships. There were 80 schools in all divisions participating in NCAA bowling as of April, 2018.

==== Fencing ====
Intercollegiate Women's Fencing Association (1929–63)

National Intercollegiate Women's Fencing Association (1964–79)

Until 1974, schools from the states of New York and New Jersey won every foil team title.

Year	Foil Team	Year	Foil Team	Year	Foil Team
1929	New York University	1946	Hunter College	1963	Fairleigh Dickinson
1930	New York University	1947	Hunter College	1964	Paterson State College
1931	New York University	1948	Hunter College	1965	Paterson State College
1932	New York University	1949	New York University	1966	Paterson State College
1933	New York University	1950	New York University	1967	Cornell
1934	Brooklyn College	1951	New York University	1968	Cornell
1935	Hunter College	1952	Hunter College	1969	Cornell
1936	Hunter College	1953	Hunter College	1970	Hunter College
1937	Hunter College	1954	Elmira College	1971	New York University
1938	New York University	1955	Rochester Institute of Technology	1972	Cornell
1939	Hofstra University	1956	Paterson State College	1973	Cornell
1940	Hunter College	1957	Rochester Institute of Technology	1974	California State-Fullerton
1941	Brooklyn College	1958	Paterson State College	1975	San Jose State
1942	Jersey City State College	1959	Paterson State College	1976	San Jose State
1943	Jersey City State College	1960	Fairleigh Dickinson	1977	San Jose State
1944	Hunter College	1961	Paterson State College	1978	San Jose State
1945	Brooklyn College	1962	Paterson State College	1979	San Jose State

AIAW 1980–82 (3 years). NCAA 1982–89, from 2026 (8+ years). NCAA (Coed) 1990–2025.

==== Ice hockey ====
American Women's College Hockey Alliance

Year and Champion
1998 New Hampshire
1999 Harvard
2000 Minnesota

NCAA from 2001.

==== Rifle ====
National Rifle Association

Year and Champion	Year and Champion	Year and Champion
192? unknown start date	1928 George Washington	1934 Washington
1923 Washington	1929 ?	1935 Carnegie Tech
1924 Washington	1930 ?	1936 Carnegie Tech
1925 Washington	1931 ?	1937 Carnegie Tech
1926 ?	1932 Maryland	1938–46? 1947 Penn State
1927 George Washington	1933 Washington	1948–53? 1954 Monmouth (IL)

NCAA (Coed) from 1980.

Pre-NCAA Coed Rifle: see above

==== Rowing ====
The National Women's Rowing Association (NWRA) sponsored an annual open eights national championship from 1971 to 1979, among college and non-college teams. (There were no eights before 1971.) During this period, only in 1973 and 1975 did a college team win the national eights championship outright. According to US Rowing Association, contemporary news reports in 1976 and 1977 do not mention a national collegiate title. Beginning in 1980, the NWRA sponsored the Women's Collegiate National Championship, including varsity eights. In 1986 the NWRA dissolved after recognizing US Rowing's assuming of responsibility as the national governing body for women's rowing.

NWRA Open National Championship, Eights top college finishers, 1971–1979 (champion in parentheses) :

- 1971 Washington, 2nd overall (first place – Vesper Boat Club)
- 1972 Washington, 4th overall (first place – College Boat Club)
- 1973 Radcliffe College (NWRA open champion)
- 1974 Radcliffe College (first place – Vesper Boat Club)
- 1975 Wisconsin (NWRA open champion)
- 1976 Wisconsin (first place – College Boat Club)
- 1977 Wisconsin (first place – Vesper Boat Club)
- 1978 Wisconsin (first place – Burnaby Boat Club)
- 1979 Yale (first place – Burnaby Boat Club)

NWRA / US Rowing Women's Collegiate National Championship, Varsity eights :

Year and Champion	Year and Champion	Year and Champion	Year and Champion
1980 California	1985 Washington	1989 Cornell	1993 Princeton
1981 Washington	1986 Wisconsin	1990 Princeton	1994 Princeton
1982 Washington *	1987 Washington	1991 Boston University	1995 Princeton
1983 Washington	1988 Washington	1992 Boston University	1996 Brown
1984 Washington	1988 Washington	1992 Boston University	1996 Brown

* simultaneous AIAW championship, the only one conducted

Followed by NCAA from 1997, in which women currently compete in a Varsity 8, a Second Varsity 8, and a Varsity Four.

==== Beach volleyball ====
American Volleyball Coaches Association, Collegiate Nationals

Year	Champion
2006	multi-school pair
2007	Nebraska (two-person team)
2008	Texas (four pairs per team)
2009	USC (four pairs per team)
2010	Loyola Marymount (two-person team)
2011	multi-school pair
2012	Pepperdine
2013	Long Beach State
2014	Pepperdine
2015	USC

NCAA from 2016.

==== Tennis (indoor) ====
Intercollegiate Tennis Association

Year	Champion	Year	Champion	Year	Champion	Year	Champion
1988	Florida	1999	Florida	2010	Northwestern	2021	North Carolina
1989	Stanford	2000	Stanford	2011	Stanford	2022	North Carolina
1990	Stanford	2001	Stanford	2012	UCLA	2023	North Carolina
1991	Florida	2002	Georgia	2013	North Carolina	2024	Oklahoma State
1992	Florida	2003	Duke	2014	Duke	2025	Georgia
1993	Stanford	2004	Stanford	2015	North Carolina	2026	
1994	Georgia	2005	Stanford	2016	California	2027	
1995	Georgia	2006	Stanford	2017	Florida	2028	
1996	Florida	2007	Georgia Tech	2018	North Carolina	2029	
1997	Florida	2008	Georgia Tech	2019	Georgia	2030	
1998	Stanford	2009	Northwestern	2020	North Carolina	2031	

==== Track and field (outdoor) ====
Women's National Collegiate and Scholastic Track Association

Telegraphic meets conducted during specified dates each May

Year	Champion
1922	?
1923	Winthrop College
1924	Iowa
1925	Winthrop College
1926	Humboldt State College
1927	?

Amateur Athletic Union

The AAU conducted senior women's national track and field championships for all athletes, both indoors and outdoors, beginning in the 1920s. Two college teams won numerous championships in each sport against other clubs from throughout the country.

Tuskegee Institute won the AAU national title 14 times in 1937–1942 and 1944–1951. Tennessee State won national outdoors 13 times in 1955–1960, 1962, 1963, 1965–1967, 1969 and 1978.

==== Track and field (indoor) ====
Amateur Athletic Union

Tuskegee Institute won the AAU national indoor championships four times in 1941, 1945, 1946 and 1948. Tennessee State won the national title 14 times in 1956–1960, 1962, 1965–1969 and 1978–1980.

==== Water polo ====
USA Water Polo

Year and Champion	Year and Champion	Year and Champion
1984 UC Davis	1990 UC San Diego	1996 UCLA
1985 Stanford	1991 UC San Diego	1997 UCLA
1986 UC San Diego	1992 UC San Diego	1998 UCLA
1987 UC Santa Barbara	1993 UC Davis	1999 USC
1988 UC Davis	1994 UC San Diego	2000 UCLA
1989 UC Santa Barbara	1995 Slippery Rock (PA)	2000 UCLA

NCAA from 2001.
