= North East Collegiate Volleyball Association =

Defunct NCAA Division III athletic conference

The North East Collegiate Volleyball Association (NECVA) was a men's volleyball collegiate association founded in 1995 and disbanded in 2011. At the time of its discontinuing being an active league, it was the largest known single-sport conference in the United States. The NECVA was a leading Division III men's volleyball conference, which comprised 43 universities and colleges stretching from New Hampshire to Virginia in its final season.

The NECVA folded in 2011, after the NCAA announced it would begin organizing a Division III national championship in 2012.

== History ==
Founded in 1995 as the Metro Conference, it became known as the NECVA in 1998. Albertus Magnus College, Daniel Webster College, Emerson College and St. Joseph's College (Brooklyn) joined the conference for the 2009 campaign. Elmira College and Penn State Behrend joined the conference in the 2010–11 season as members of the newly formed United Volleyball Conference.

The league was divided into five smaller divisions: CUNYAC (8), GNAC (7), Metro (10), New England (8), and Western (9) with one associate member. Each week, schools from the five divisions nominated athletes and then voted for the divisional Player and Rookie of the Week awards. The conference sports information office then selected the NECVA Player and Rookie honors from each of these five divisional winners.

The NECVA held an annual 16-team conference tournament called the NECVA Championship Tournament each April with the top two schools in each division and six at-large selections earning berths. The NECVA champion received an automatic bid to the Molten Division III Men's Invitational Volleyball Championship Tournament in April.
