= Ron Friedman =

Ron Friedman may refer to:

- Ron Friedman (producer) (1932–2025), American television- and film producer and writer
- Ron Friedman (author) (born 1977), American psychologist and behavior change expert
- Ron J. Friedman, American screenwriter
