= NECVA Championship Tournament =

The NECVA Championship Tournament was the culminating event of the season for the North East Collegiate Volleyball Association, an NCAA Division III conference that only sponsored men's volleyball. The tournament was held annually in April, and its location was selected by the NECVA Executive Board from a pool of hosting bids. By the time of its final edition in 2011, the tournament featured 16 of the conference's 43 member schools—the top two in each of five divisions (CUNYAC, GNAC, Metro, New England, and Western), plus six at-large selections. The NECVA champion tournament received one of four automatic bids to the Molten Division III Final Four later in April.

The NECVA chose to disband at the end of the 2011 season after the NCAA announced it would begin sponsoring an official Division III men's championship in 2012.

== Tournament participation history ==
As Metro 1995-97; NECVA 1998 to 2011

School	Appearances	Years participated	Wins	Losses	PCT.	1st	2nd
Bard College	1	2006	0	1	0	0	0
Baruch College	8	1998-1999-2004-2005-2006-2007-2008-2009	3	8	0,273	0	0
Brooklyn College	5	1996-1997-1998-2005-2007	1	5	0,167	0	0
City College of New York	8	1995-1996-2000-2001-2002-2003-2004-2008	4	7	0,364	1	0
College of Mount Saint Vincent	10	1995-1996-1997-1998-1999-2000-2002-2003-2004-2005	14	7	0,667	2	1
D'Youville College	9	1999-2000-2001-2003-2004-2005-2006-2007-2008	16	6	0,727	3	0
Eastern Mennonite University	8	2002-2003-2004-2005-2006-2007-2008-2009	14	8	0,636	0	3
Elms College	2	2008-2009	0	2	0	0	0
Emmanuel College	3	2004-2007-2009	0	3	0	0	0
Endicott College	6	2002-2003-2004-2007-2008-2009	4	6	0,4	0	0
Hunter College	12	1998-1999-2000-2001-2002-2003-2004-2005-2006-2007-2008-2009	6	12	0,333	0	1
John Jay College∗	3	1995-1997-1998	0	3	0	0	0
Johnson and Wales University	5	2000-2001-2002-2003-2006	3	5	0,375	0	0
Lehman College	5	1998-1999-2000-2001-2002	4	7	0,364	0	0
Massachusetts Institute of Technology	5	2005-2006-2007-2008-2009	4	5	0,444	0	0
Medaille College	9	1999-2001-2002-2004-2005-2006-2007-2008-2009	8	9	0,471	1	2
Medgar Evers College	1	2003	0	1	0	0	0
Nazareth College	6	2006-2007-2008-2009-2010-2011	15	4	0,789	2	1
Newbury College	6	2005-2007-2008-2009-2010-2011	5	4	0,556	0	1
New Jersey City University	8	1996-1997-1998-1999-2000-2001-2006-2007	6	8	0,429	0	1
NYC College of Technology	1	2000	0	1	0	0	0
Philadelphia Biblical University	4	2003-2007-2008-2009	3	4	0,429	0	0
Ramapo College	13	1995-1996-1997-1998-1999-2000-2001-2002-2003-2006-2007-2008-2009	16	10	0,615	2	1
Rivier College	9	2001-2002-2003-2004-2005-2006-2007-2008-2009	9	8	0,529	1	1
Stevens Institute of Technology	13	1995-1998-1999-2000-2001-2002-2003-2004-2005-2006-2007-2008-2009	23	9	0,719	4	2
Stevenson University	1	2006	0	1	0	0	0
SUNY New Paltz	5	2004-2005-2006-2007-2009	4	5	0,444	0	0
SUNY Old Westbury∗	2	1995-1997	1	2	0,333	0	0
USMMA∗	6	1996-1997-1998-2000-2001-2002	1	7	0,125	0	0
Vassar College	2	2008-2009	6	1	0,857	1	0
Wentworth Institute of Technology	4	1998-1999-2000-2001	4	4	0,5	0	1
Western New England College∗	2	1998-1999	0	2	0	0	0
York College (NY)	4	1995-1996-1997-2004	2	4	0,333	0	0

∗ Denotes program discontinued

== Tournament champions ==
Year	Result	Tournament MVP	Host
1995	Ramapo College def. Sacred Heart University, 3-1	Randall Diaz (Sacred Heart)	Ramapo College
1996	Ramapo College def. New Jersey City University, 3-0	Satsay Thongvichith (NJCU)	Stevens Institute of Technology
1997	College of Mount Saint Vincent def. Ramapo College, 3-0	Eugene Zabolotsky (CMSV)	Stevens Institute of Technology
1998	College of Mount Saint Vincent def. Stevens Institute of Technology, 3-2	Matt DeStefano (CMSV)	Stevens Institute of Technology
1999	D'Youville College def. Medaille College, 3-0	Ben Rowell (D'Youville)	Ramapo College
2000	D'Youville College def. Wentworth Institute of Technology, 3-0	Gregg Rosowski (D'Youville)	Ramapo College/Stevens
2001	D'Youville College def. Hunter College, 3-0 (30-23, 30-25, 30-26)	Bob Collins (D'Youville)	Stevens Institute of Technology
2002	City College of New York (College of Mount Saint Vincent, runners-up)∗	Alexandro Flores (Lehman)	Johnson and Wales University
2003	Stevens Institute of Technology def. Eastern MennoniteUniversity, 3-2	Chris Bock (Stevens)	City College of New York
	Medaille College def. Rivier College, 3-2	Erik Hartman (Medaille)	Medaille/D'Youville Colleges
2005	Stevens Institute of Technology def. Medaille College, 3-0 (30-23, 30-23, 30-24)	Chris Bock (Stevens)	Ramapo College
2006	Rivier College def. Eastern Mennonite University, 3-2 (24-30, 30-20, 30-18, 24-30, 15-8)	Andrew Chace (Rivier)	Endicott College
2007	Stevens Institute of Technology def. Eastern MennoniteUniversity, 3-0 (30-28, 30-24, 30-27)	Michael Schulte (Stevens)	Nazareth College
2008	Vassar College def. Newbury College, 3-1 (30-21, 30-26, 27-30, 30-12)	John Kessenich (Vassar)	Ramapo College
2009	Stevens Institute of Technology def. Nazareth College, 3-1(26-30, 30-22, 30-25, 30-21)	Andrew Cranford (Stevens)	Massachusetts Institute of Technology
2010	Nazareth def. Philadelphia Biblical University, (30-22, 30-28, 30-28)	Hans Schroeder (Nazareth)	Hyannis Youth and Community Center in Cape Cod, Massachusetts
2011	Nazareth def. Baruch College, (25-23, 18-25, 18-25, 30-28, 15-12)	Billy Gimello (Nazareth)	Stevens Institute of Technology

∗Note: Lehman College won the championship; title was later vacated;
