= John Viavattine =

American musician

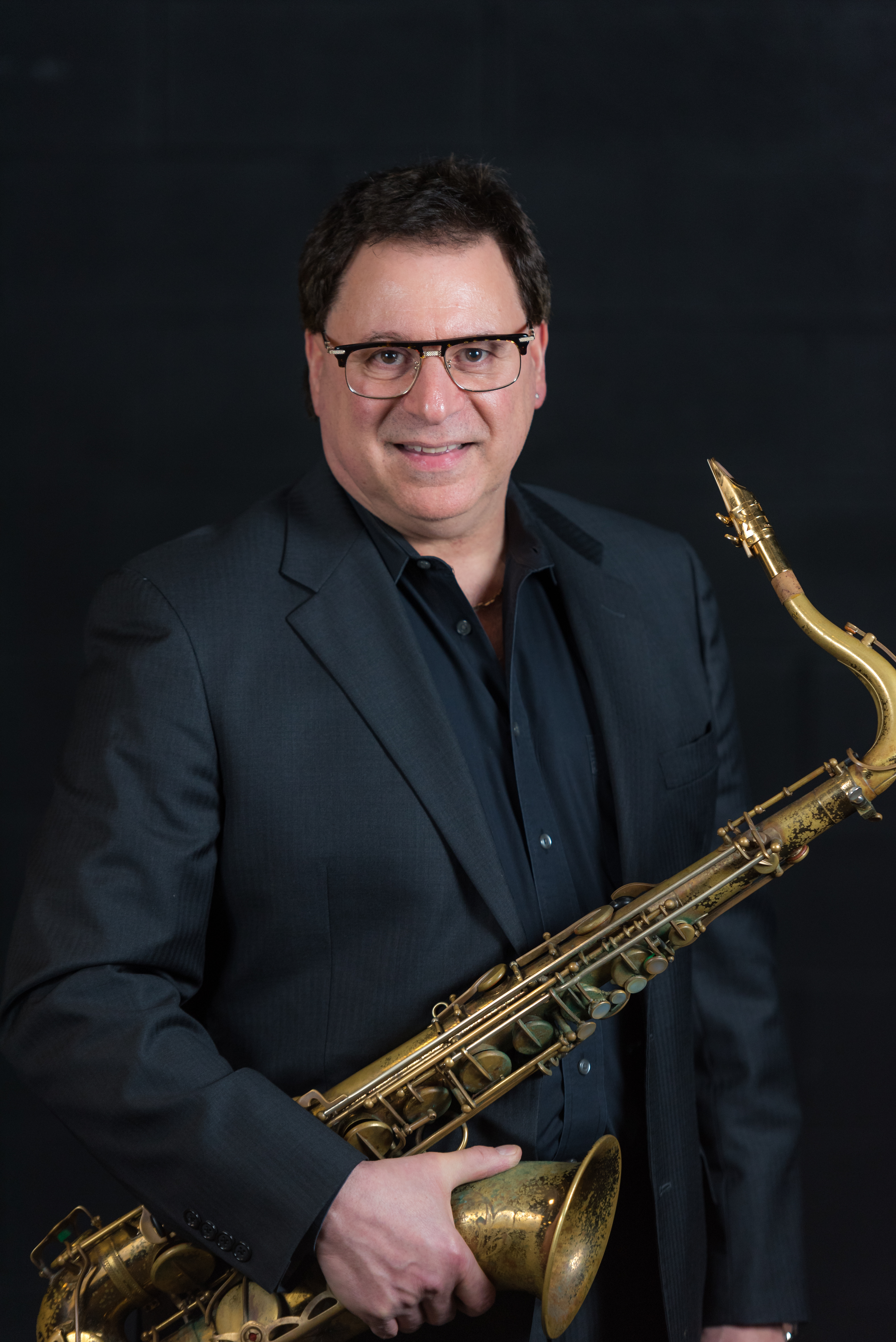

Background information
- Born: March 21, 1955 (age 71)
- Origin: Rochester, New York, U.S.
- Genres: Jazz, pop
- Occupations: Musician, teacher (retired)
- Instruments: Saxophone, clarinet, flute
- Member of: Mambo Kings

John Viavattine (born March 21, 1955) is an American professional woodwind performer who worked as instrumental music teacher at East Rochester Junior-Senior High School and Spencerport High School in Spencerport, New York.

== Career ==
=== Music performer ===
Viavattine has performed with a variety of popular musicians. He played on tour with the Glenn Miller Orchestra, including a memorable performance in Washington, D.C. at President Ronald Reagan's 1980 Inaugural Ball. He has also performed with Ray Charles, Patti Page, The Temptations, Chuck and Gap Mangione, Randy Brecker, Jeff Tyzik and the Rochester Philharmonic Orchestra, Connie Francis, Vic Damone, Aretha Franklin and Lou Rawls.

He is a member of Mambo Kings, started by another local musician and composer, Richard Delaney. He is also a member of one of Rochester's premier party bands, Unlimited, founded and directed by his brother Bob Viavattine.

Viavattine began playing when he was young, learning early on from his teacher, Joe Romano, to pay strict attention to time, keeping with the rhythm section, and complimenting them.

On June 12, 2007, Viavattine and the Mambo Kings opened for the rock group Los Lonely Boys at the Rochester International Jazz Festival.

=== Music teacher ===
After earning his bachelor's degree in music from Nazareth College, he moved to Los Angeles, California to teach for a short time before returning to Upstate New York to teach at East Rochester Junior-Senior High School in East Rochester, NY and Spencerport High School in Spencerport, New York. He was the director of the Spencerport Wind Ensemble, and in conjunction with his colleague, Ben Osborne, the Spencerport Symphonic Band. In 2007, Viavattine received the RPO educator of the year award. Students said that it is his passion for music which encourages them. He acted as a role model by being active in the musical scene around Rochester outside of school.

=== High school jazz ===
During his career at Spencerport High School, Viavattine was the director of the Jazz Ensemble (also known as "Jazz One"). The group ranks as one of the top high school bands in the country, ranking first place in music festivals nationwide. In March 2007, Spencerport Jazz One took first place in the Berklee Jazz Festival. In April 2007, Jazz One took first place at the Heritage Festival in Orlando, Florida, competing against more than twenty schools from across the nation. On April 18, 2007, Viavattine led the band to another first place at the MCC Jazz Festival. In 2008, they won first place in a nationwide Yamaha recording contest, judged in part by members of Tower of Power.

In 2013, the ensemble won a competition to record a single with American artist and former American Idol contestant, Shaun Canon. The recording is available on the Indian music streaming service JioSaavn as a part of Canon's Singles album. On June 2, 2017, the ensemble recorded their own album called On Common Ground, which recorded select jazz songs the ensemble had played, and also included two songs played by Spencerport's Vocal Jazz.

A classic tradition, the Spencerport Jazz Ensemble hosts their annual 'Evening of Jazz'. This is held in the school's cafeteria, which is transformed into a classic jazz lounge. Each year, Viavattine invites special guest artists to play with the Ensemble, and show off some of their songs. Some of these artists include Steve Gadd, Rick Braun, Gap Mangione, Richard Elliot, Tom Bones Malone and Conrad Herwig.
