= Elizabeth L. Paul =

American academic administrator

Elizabeth L. Paul (born May 21, 1963) is an American academic administrator and psychologist. She served as president of Nazareth University from July 2020 to June 2026. Paul was the 16th president of Capital University. She previously served as executive vice president of Stetson University where she was a tenured professor of psychology. Paul was a longtime faculty member at The College of New Jersey.

== Education ==
Paul completed a bachelor's degree in psychology and a doctorate in personality psychology at Boston University. She conducted pre-doctoral training at the National Institute of Mental Health. Paul completed a certificate in higher education administration from the Institute for Educational Management at Harvard University.

== Career ==
From 1992 to 2009, Paul was a vice provost and professor of psychology at The College of New Jersey. She joined Stetson University in 2009 as provost and vice president of academic affairs. In 2015, she became provost and executive vice president. She was also a tenured professor of psychology.

In 2010 - 2011, Paul served as the president of the board of the Council on Undergraduate Research (CUR) and sought formal unification of CUR with NCUR, the National Conference on Undergraduate Research.

On July 1, 2016, she became the 16th president of Capital University. On September 6, 2019, she announced she would leave the university in June 2020.

Paul became the 10th president of Nazareth University on July 1, 2020, succeeding Daan Braveman. Her 6-year tenure as president ended in June 2026. Paul guided the institution from college to university status and ushered in the celebration of the university's 100th year celebration. Nazareth honored her tenure as president and her commitment to the student body by naming the Dr. Elizabeth L. Paul Student Life Suite.

In 2026, Paul serves on the Board of the Corella & Bertram F. Bonner Foundation, which works toward providing basic needs of educational opportunity and food security.

== See also ==
- List of women presidents or chancellors of co-ed colleges and universities
