= East Rochester Union Free School District =

School district in New York, United States

Location
- 222 Woodbine Ave; East Rochester, NY 14445 Parts of Monroe County, New York United States
- Coordinates: 43.1085°N 77.4910°W

District information
- Type: Public
- Motto: Tradition and Vision
- Grades: Pre-K–12 and adult education
- Established: 1920
- Superintendent: Scott Wilcox
- Accreditation: New York State Education Department
- Schools: One elementary school (K–6); One combined junior/senior high school (7–12)
- Budget: ▼US$25.2 million (2011–2012)
- NCES District ID: 3609930

Students and staff
- Students: ▲1,268 (2011–2012)
- Teachers: ▲122 (2011–2012)
- Staff: ▲98 (2011–2012)

Other information
- Unions: NYSUT, East Rochester Teachers' Association
- Website: www.erschools.org

The East Rochester Union Free School District is a public school district in New York State that serves approximately 1,200 students in the Town/Village of East Rochester and portions of the towns of Penfield, Perinton and Pittsford in Monroe County, with over 200 employees and an operating budget of $23 million (~$16,838 per student).

The average class size is 20-23 students and the student-teacher ratio is 11:1.

The District's motto is "Tradition and Vision".

Scott Wilcox is Superintendent.

== Board of education ==
The Board of Education (BOE) consists of 5 members who serve rotating 3-year terms. Elections are held each May for board members and to vote on the School District Budget.

Current board members are:

- Patrick Flanagan, President
- Vincent Antonicelli, Vice-President
- Janalee Herb
- Kristina Lantzky-Eaton
- Michael Sisson

Superintendents
Name	Tenure
Louis E. Bird (Note: Superintendent Bird (1875–1942) should not be confused with his daughter, schoolteacher Lois E. Bird (1906–1996), for whom the Bird/Morgan school in East Rochester is named.)	1921 – 1927
John E. Demorest	1927 – 1930
Benjamin H. Root	1930 – 1932
Theodore L.R. Morgan	1932 – 1944
Lewis C. Obourn	1944 – 1970
Harry H. Beno	1970 – 1975
Nicholas A. Verzella (acting)	June 1975 – November 1975
Joseph J. DelRosso	1975 – 1980
Joseph G. Ennis	1980 – 1989
James McGinnis (acting)	July 1989 – March 1990
Lorenzo E. Benati	April 1990 – May 1996
Howard S. Maffucci	July 1996 – June 2010
Raymond J. Giamartino Jr	July 2010 – June 2013
Richard G. Stutzman (interim)	July 2013 – June 2015
Mark D. Linton	July 2015 – July 2019
Richard G. Stutzman (interim)	2019 – 2020
James Haugh	August 2020 – June 2026
Scott Wilcox	2026 – present

== Schools ==
=== Elementary schools ===
- East Rochester Elementary School (PK-5), Principal - Marisa Philp

=== Middle school-high school ===
- East Rochester Junior/Senior High School (6-12), Principal - Casey van Harssel
