= Herbie J Pilato =

American writer and historian (born 1960)

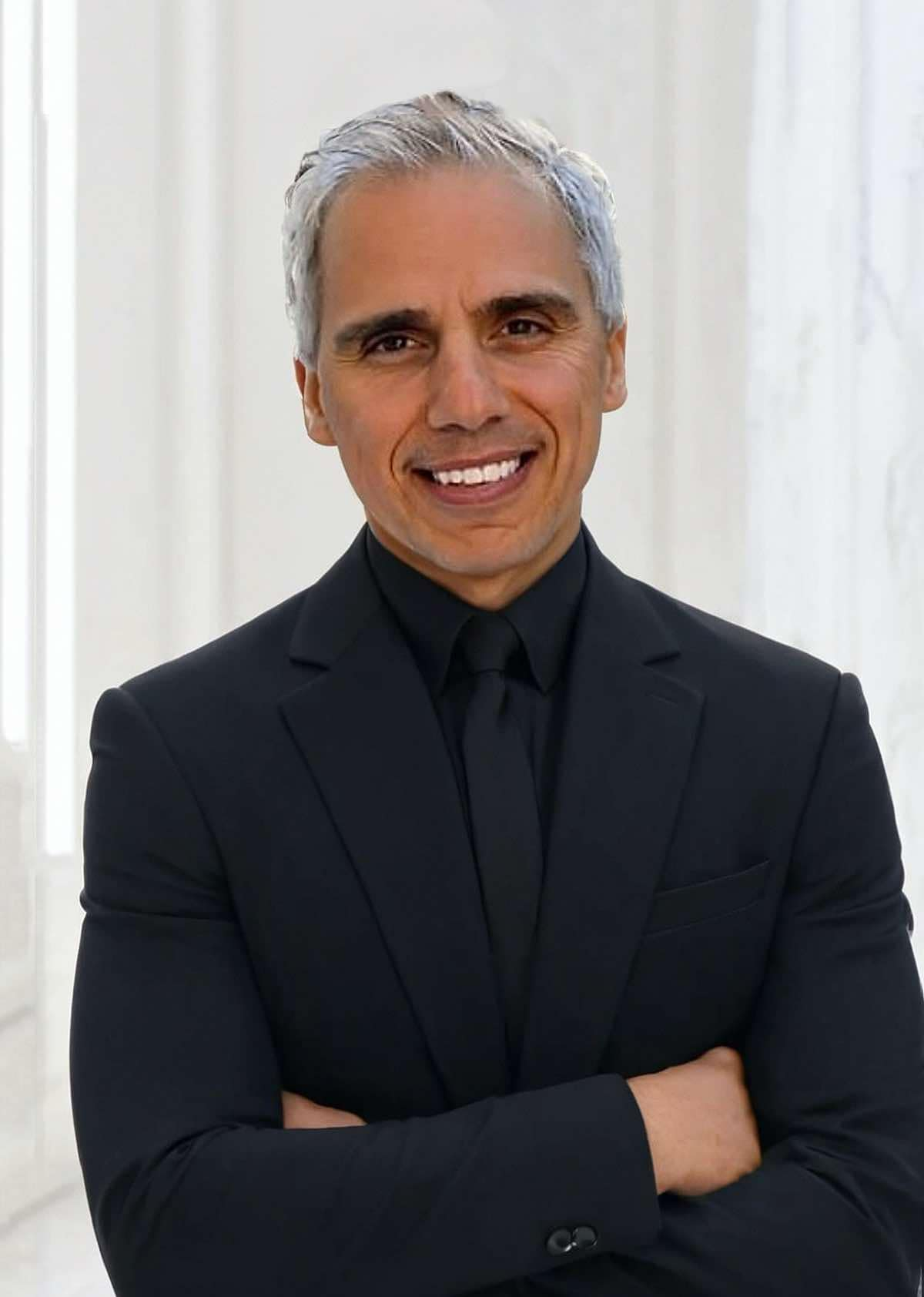
- Pilato in 2025
- Born: October 9, 1960 (age 65); Rochester, New York, US
- Occupation: Writer/Filmmaker/Performer
- Years active: 1984–present

Herbie J Pilato (born October 9, 1960) is a classically trained American actor, and an award-winning writer and producer.

== Early life and education ==
Herbie J Pilato was born Herbert James Pilato on October 9, 1960, in Rochester, New York, to Frances Mary Pilato (née Turri) and Herbert Pompeii Pilato. His parents were of Italian descent. He completed a bachelor's degree in Theatre Arts from Nazareth University, and also studied Television and Film at the University of California, Los Angeles. Pilato served his internship in Television from May 1984 to December 1985 as an NBC Page at the network's facility in Burbank, California.

== Career ==
Herbie J Pilato began acting in his hometown of Rochester, New York, with early appearances in live stage productions of You're A Good Man, Charlie Brown, Santa Claus is Comin' to Town, and Jesus Christ Superstar, among others.

In the 1980s, he moved to Los Angeles and was soon cast in bit roles on daytime soaps like General Hospital, The Bold and the Beautiful, and primetime fare like Highway to Heaven, and The Golden Girls, The New Leave It To Beaver, and more.

During this time, Pilato was also a stand-in dancer on TV's music-variety series, Solid Gold, and acted and sang in clubs along the Sunset Strip.

In 1992, Pilato published his first book, The Bewitched Book, about the classic 1960s TV series. From there, he published other classic TV literary companions and began producing and appearing on classic TV documentaries for Bravo, A&E, and TLC, among others. He also consulted on and appeared in some DVD and Blu-ray packages of classic TV shows for Sony, Warner Bros., and NBCUniversal.

In 2013, Pilato established the Classic TV Preservation Society (CTVPS), a formal 501(c)3 nonprofit organization that celebrates and advocates for the positive social effect of classic TV shows.

In 2015, Pilato began his popular live weekly events, Throwback Thursdays with Herbie J Pilato, at the Burbank Barnes and Noble.

In 2019, Pilato hosted, co-created, and co-executive-produced his own TV talk show,Then Again With Herbie J Pilato , which began streaming on Shout TV and Amazon Prime .

In October 2022, the Reelz Channel aired the documentary, Elizabeth Montgomery: A Bewitched Life , for which Pilato presented with AMS Pictures as a co-executive producer, co-director, and co-writer. Pilato was also the primary on-screen cultural commentator for this production.

In December 2022, Pilato published The 12 Best Secrets of Christmas: A Treasure House of December Memories Revealed , a holiday memoir of his youth growing up in Rochester during the 1960s and '70s. Featuring a Foreword by TV icon Dean Butler, of Little House on the Prairie, and an Introduction by actor/voiceover star Jerry Houser (The Summer of '42), The 12 Best Secrets of Christmas universalizes the messages of kindness and unity for all cultures.

In early 2023, Pilato published Retro Active Television: An In-Depth Perspective of Classic TV's Social Circuitry , which explores the positive impact of classic TV. The Los Angeles Book Festival recently named Retro "Book of the Year," and subsequently, Pilato, "Author of the Year." With a Foreword by actor Eric Scott, of TV's The Waltons, Retro Active Television has received additional high praise, including endorsements from those like Marc Wade of the Television Academy, and Emmys.com .

In his blurb on the back cover of Retro Active Television, Wade says the book "connects the dots between the medium's origins and milestones, between the past and the present...and how we can utilize it productively for the future."

In the fall of 2023, Pilato had two new books published: Connery, Sean Connery: Before, During and After His Most Famous Role , a biography of the Oscar-winning star, and a Special Commemorative Edition of The Bionic Book: The Six Million Dollar Man and The Bionic Woman Reconstructed .

The Connery biography features a Foreword by actress Barbara Carrera, Connery's co-star from Never Say Never Again, his final film bow as James Bond 007 — and which recently celebrated its 40th Anniversary. The book was also released with the 60th Anniversary of From Russia With Love, which was Connery's favorite of his Bond movies.

The new edition of The Bionic Book was released in tandem with the 50th Anniversary of The Six Million Dollar Man's debut (and features exclusive commentary from Bionic stars Lee Majors and Lindsay Wagner).

Additionally, 2023 saw the audiobook release of Pilato's Retro Active Television , along with his celebrity biographies, Mary: The Mary Tyler Moore Story , and Twitch Upon a Star: The Bewitched Life and Career of Elizabeth Montgomery . Furthermore, his Sean Connery biography also became available in audiobook form.

In other news for 2023, Closer Magazine featured Pilato's Sean Connery biography and Pilato's commentary in their October 9, 2023 issue; ReMind Magazine published Pilato's Bewitched cover story in their October 2023 issue.

Meanwhile, 2024 marked the 40th Anniversary of Pilato being an NBC Page, which he wrote about in NBC & ME: My Life As a Page In a Book, which has recently been released in hardcover.

In its March 2024 issue, Retro Fan Magazine published Pilato's Magical Memories of Elizabeth Montgomery article as a Bewitched 60th Anniversary Celebration cover story.

In its June 2024 issue, Retro Fan Magazine published Pilato's cover story tribute to The Six Million Dollar Man and The Bionic Woman .

In its July/August 2024 issue, Retro Fan Magazine published Pilato's cover story tribute to CHiPs , the classic TV series starring Erik Estrada and Larry Wilcox.

In the fall of 2024, the University Press of Mississippi published Pilato's new celebrity bio, One Tough Dame: The Life and Career of Diana Rigg , his book about the 1960s TV female icon. Rupert Macnee, son of Patrick Macnee (Rigg's former TV Avengers co-star) has written the Foreword, while Avengers director Ray Austin has penned the Introduction. One Tough Dame is also available in audiobook form.

Additionally, Applause Books has published his new Christmas book, Christmas TV Memories: Nostalgic Favorites of the Small Screen , for which Marlo Thomas has written the Foreword. (Like One Tough Dame, it's also available as an audiobook.)

In 2024, Pilato established his YouTube channel, HJP-TV (Herbie J Pilato Television).

== Selected publications ==
- Pilato, Herbie J (1992). The Bewitched Book: The Cosmic Companion To TV's Most Magical Supernatural Situation Comedy. New York: Delta. ISBN 9780385306997.
- —— (1993). The Kung Fu Book Of Caine: The Complete Guide To TV's First Mystical Eastern Western. Boston: Tuttle Co. ISBN 9780804818261.
- —— (1995). The Kung Fu Book Of Wisdom: Sage Advice From The Original TV Series. Boston: C.E. Tuttle. ISBN 9780804830447.
- —— (2004). Bewitched Forever: The Immortal Companion to Television's Most Magical Supernatural Situation Comedy. Irving, TX: Tapestry Press. ISBN 9781930819405.
- —— (2007). The Bionic Book: The Six Million Dollar Man And The Bionic Woman Reconstructed : The Cybernetic Compendium To TV's Most Realistic Sci-Fi Superhero Shows. Albany, GA: BearManor Media. ISBN 9781593930837.
- —— (2007). Life Story: The Book Of Life Goes On. Albany, GA: BearManor Media. ISBN 9781593930851.
- —— (2008). NBC & Me: My Life As A Page In A Book. Albany, GA: BearManor Media. ISBN 9781593931315.
- —— (2012). Twitch Upon A Star: The Bewitched Life And Career Of Elizabeth Montgomery. Lanham, MD: Taylor Trade Publishing. ISBN 9781630760250.
- —— (2013). The Essential Elizabeth Montgomery: A Guide To Her Magical Performances. Lanham, MD: Taylor Trade Publishing. ISBN 9781589798243.
- —— (2014). Glamour, Gidgets, And The Girl Next Door: Television's Iconic Women From the '50s, '60s, and '70s. Lanham, MD: Taylor Trade Publishing. ISBN 9781589799707.
- —— (2016). Dashing, Daring, and Debonair: TV's Top Male Icons From The '50s, '60s, and '70s. Lanham, MD: Taylor Trade Publishing. ISBN 9781630760533.
- —— (2019). Mary: The Mary Tyler Moore Story. Jacobs/Brown Press. ISBN 9780999507841.
- —— (2023). Connery, Sean Connery: Before, During and After His Most Famous Role. Orlando, FL: BearManor Media. ISBN 9798887712642.
- —— (2023). The Bionic Book: The Six Million Dollar Man and The Bionic Woman Reconstructed-Special Commemorative Edition. Orlando, FL: BearManor Media. ISBN 9781629330105.
- —— (2023). Retro Active Television: An In-Depth Perspective on Classic TV's Social Circuitry. Terra Alta, WV: Headline Books. ISBN 9781958914083.
- —— (2024). Christmas TV Memories: Nostalgic Holiday Favorites of the Small Screen. Kenner, LA: Applause Books. ISBN 9781493079704.
- —— (2024). One Tough Dame: The Life and Career of Diana Rigg. Jackson, MS: University Press of Mississippi. ISBN 9781496837974.
