= Nazareth University =

Private university in Pittsford, New York, US

Coordinates: 43°6′10″N 77°31′10″W

- Former name: Nazareth College of Rochester (1924–2023)
- Type: Private university
- Established: September 24, 1924; 101 years ago
- Accreditation: MSCHE
- Religious affiliation: None; formerly Roman Catholic
- Endowment: $102.5 million (2025)
- President: Elizabeth L. Paul
- Faculty: 175 full-time, 327 part-time
- Students: 2,401 (fall 2024)
- Undergraduates: 1,882 (fall 2024)
- Postgraduates: 519 (fall 2024)
- Location: Rochester - Pittsford, New York, United States
- Campus: 150 acres (0.61 km^{2}); Large suburb
- Colors: Purple and gold
- Nickname: Golden Flyers
- Sporting affiliations: NCAA Division III - E8; UVC; UCHC
- Mascot: Golden Flyer
- Website: naz.edu
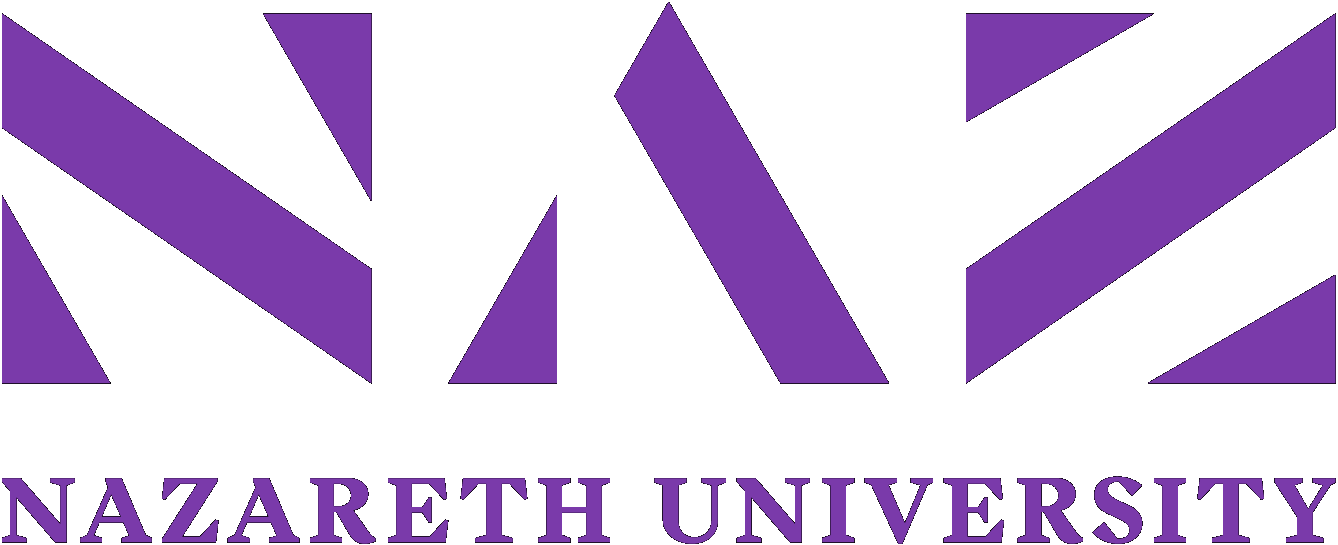

Nazareth University (also known as Naz) is a private university in Pittsford, New York, United States. It offers over 60 undergraduate majors and more than two dozen graduate programs. The college was previously Nazareth College of Rochester, or Nazareth College.

== History ==
At the request of Thomas Francis Hickey, Bishop of Rochester, five Sisters of St. Joseph founded Nazareth College of Rochester in 1924 to provide undergraduate education to young women. The first class was composed of 25 young women who began their studies in a large mansion on Lake Avenue in Rochester, New York. The original mansion that housed the college was known as "the Glass House." At that time, the college offered Bachelor of Arts and Bachelor of Science degrees, each with a liberal arts core. In response to increasing enrollment, the college moved to a larger facility in 1928 at 402 Augustine Street.

In the 1960s and 1970s, Nazareth College admitted men and became independent of its founding religious congregation.

On June 1, 2023, Nazareth's status changed from a college to a university after the state changed the relevant guidelines.

== Campus ==
The campus has 24 buildings, including 11 residence halls, a 2,200-seat stadium, and all-weather track, located on 150 acres (0.61 km^{2}).

The Golisano Academic Center was built in 1927. It is the oldest and largest building on campus, once serving as the "motherhouse" for the Sisters of St. Joseph who founded Nazareth. It was purchased from the Sisters of St. Joseph in 2003 and is now used for academic and administrative purposes. Features of the Center include the Linehan Chapel and Sorelle's gathering space. The Nazareth University Arts Center, which houses the departments of theatre arts, music, and art and design, opened in 1967. The Arts Center was renovated in September 2009 to become a dance and performance venue.

The Golisano Training Center (opened in fall 2019), is a multi-use facility supporting varsity athletics, Special Olympics events, fitness, and a wide range of campus activities.

The campus was listed as the Nazareth College census-designated place in 2020, with a population of 1,182.

== Academics ==
Academic rankings

Master's
- Washington Monthly: 179 of 604

Regional
- U.S. News & World Report: 54 (tie) of 151

National
- WSJ/College Pulse: 478 of 500

Nazareth University is organized into four schools:

- College of Liberal Arts, Sciences, Business, and Education, which includes:
  - School of Education
  - School of Business and Leadership
- College of Interprofessional Health and Human Services
- College of Visual and Performing Arts and Design, which includes:
  - School of Music

Nazareth offers more than 60 bachelor's degree programs, more than 20 master's degree programs, a Doctorate of Physical Therapy, and three post-baccalaureate certificate programs.

As of 2017, 88% of the students came from within New York State.

== Athletics ==
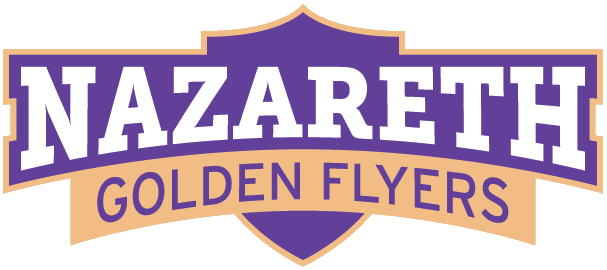
Nazareth Golden Flyers wordmark

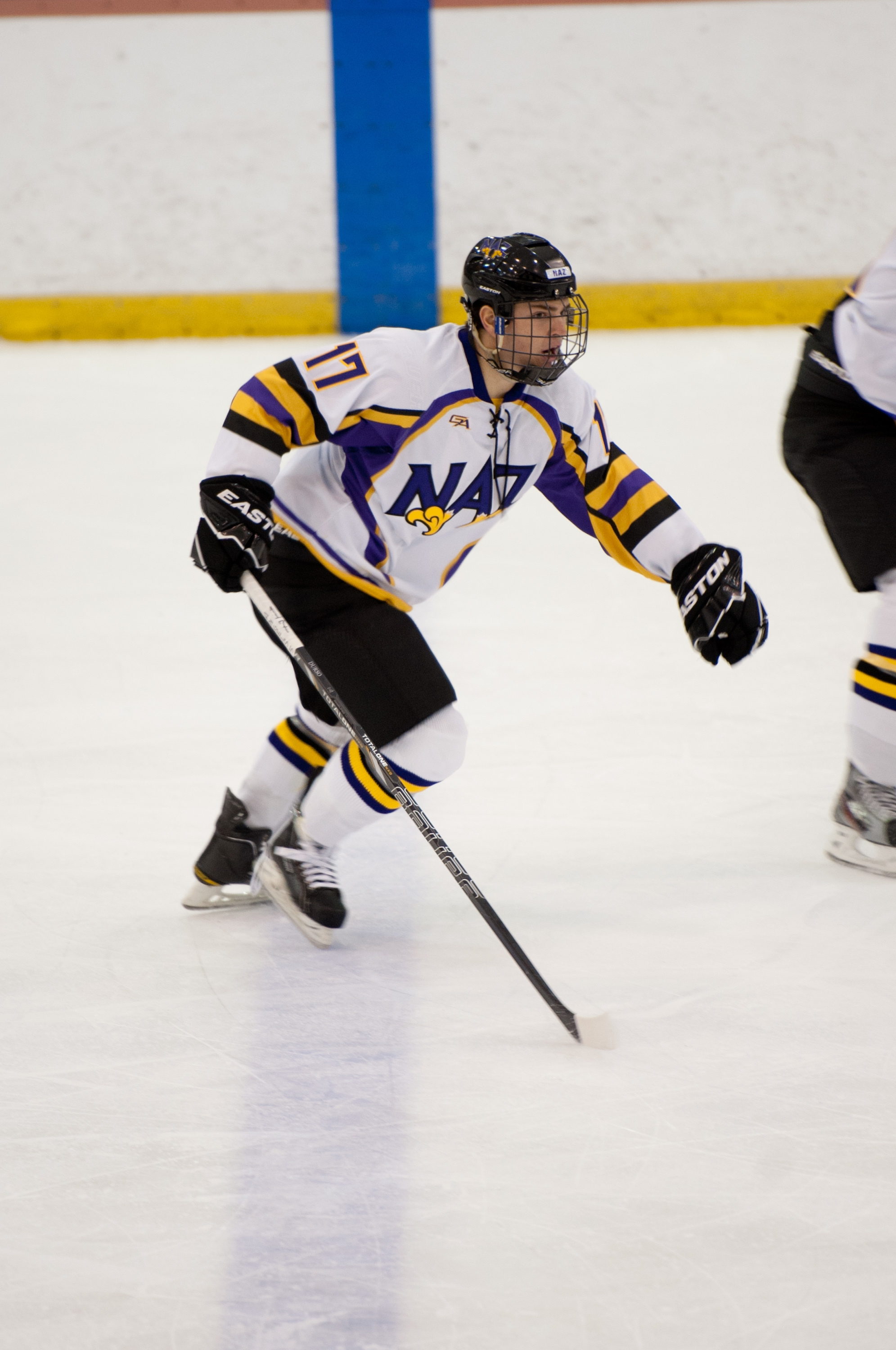
Nazareth ice hockey player

Nazareth's men's and women's athletic teams are members of the National Collegiate Athletic Association's (NCAA) Division III with the exception of the men's Rugby team playing at the Division I level. The Golden Flyers are a member of the Empire 8 Athletic Conference (Empire 8). For men's volleyball, Nazareth is a member of the single-sport United Volleyball Conference and for men's ice hockey, a member of the United Collegiate Hockey Conference.

Athletic facilities at Nazareth include the Robert A. Kidera Gymnasium (1,200), Golden Flyer Stadium (2,200), and the Golisano Training Center, a full size indoor field house with an indoor track, tennis courts, and turf field.

The Nazareth men's lacrosse team is a three-time NCAA Division III National Champion (1992, 1996, and 1997). The team has also appeared in the NCAA postseason tournament nineteen times. In 2011, the Nazareth men's indoor volleyball team achieved a #1 national ranking and won the Molten Division III National Championship, while in 2013 they finished runner-up in the NCAA Division III championship to Springfield.

Nazareth University's traditional rival is St. John Fisher University, just a mile north. The annual men's basketball game between the schools is known as "The Battle of the Beaks."

== Notable people ==
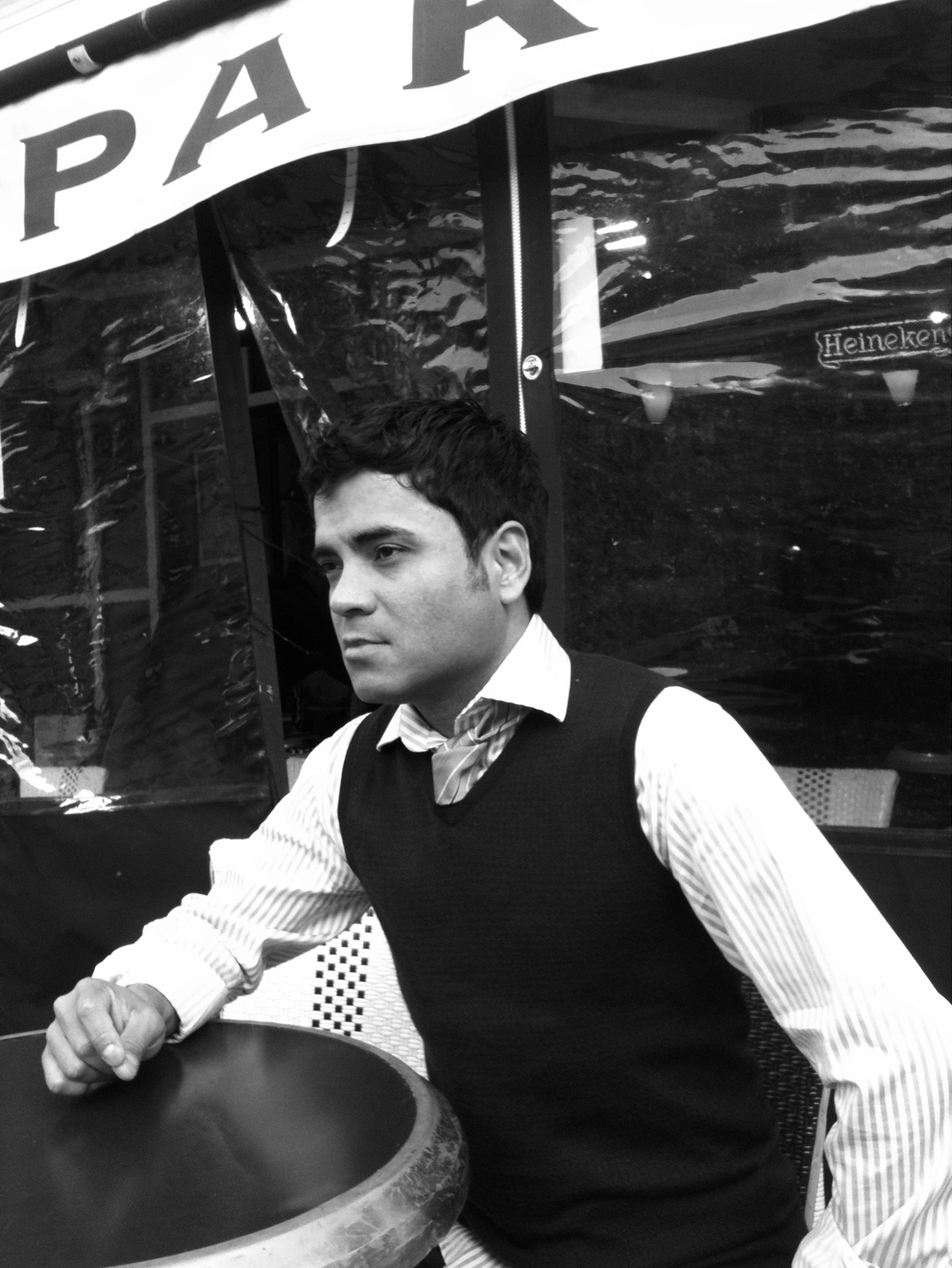
Manuel Rivera-Ortiz

=== Alumni ===
- Steve Anderson, director
- Catherine Cool Rumsey, former member of the Rhode Island Senate
- Malik Evans, mayor of Rochester, New York
- Gail Haines, former member of the Michigan House of Representatives
- Jim Jabir, basketball coach
- Rich Kilgour, former lacrosse player
- Judith A. McMorrow, professor
- Shannon B. Olsson, scientist
- Karen Osborne, author
- Michael Park, actor
- Herbie J Pilato, actor
- Neal Powless, lacrosse player and coach
- Manuel Rivera-Ortiz, photographer
- Jeff Van Gundy, basketball coach
- John Viavattine, musician
- angel Kyodo williams, writer

=== Faculty ===
- John Beilein, basketball coach
- Craig Dahl, hockey coach
- Jared DeMichiel, hockey coach
- Ron Friedman, professor
- Richard Hirsch, professor
- Tom Parrotta, basketball coach
- Scott Perkins, professor
- George Roll, hockey coach
- Steve Scully, professor
- Robert Silverman, professor
- David Tacey, professor
- Andrea Talentino, former vice president of Academic Affairs
- Octavio Vázquez, professor
- Max Wickert, professor
- Yamuna Sangarasivam, professor
