= Ron Friedman (author) =

American psychologist (born 1977)

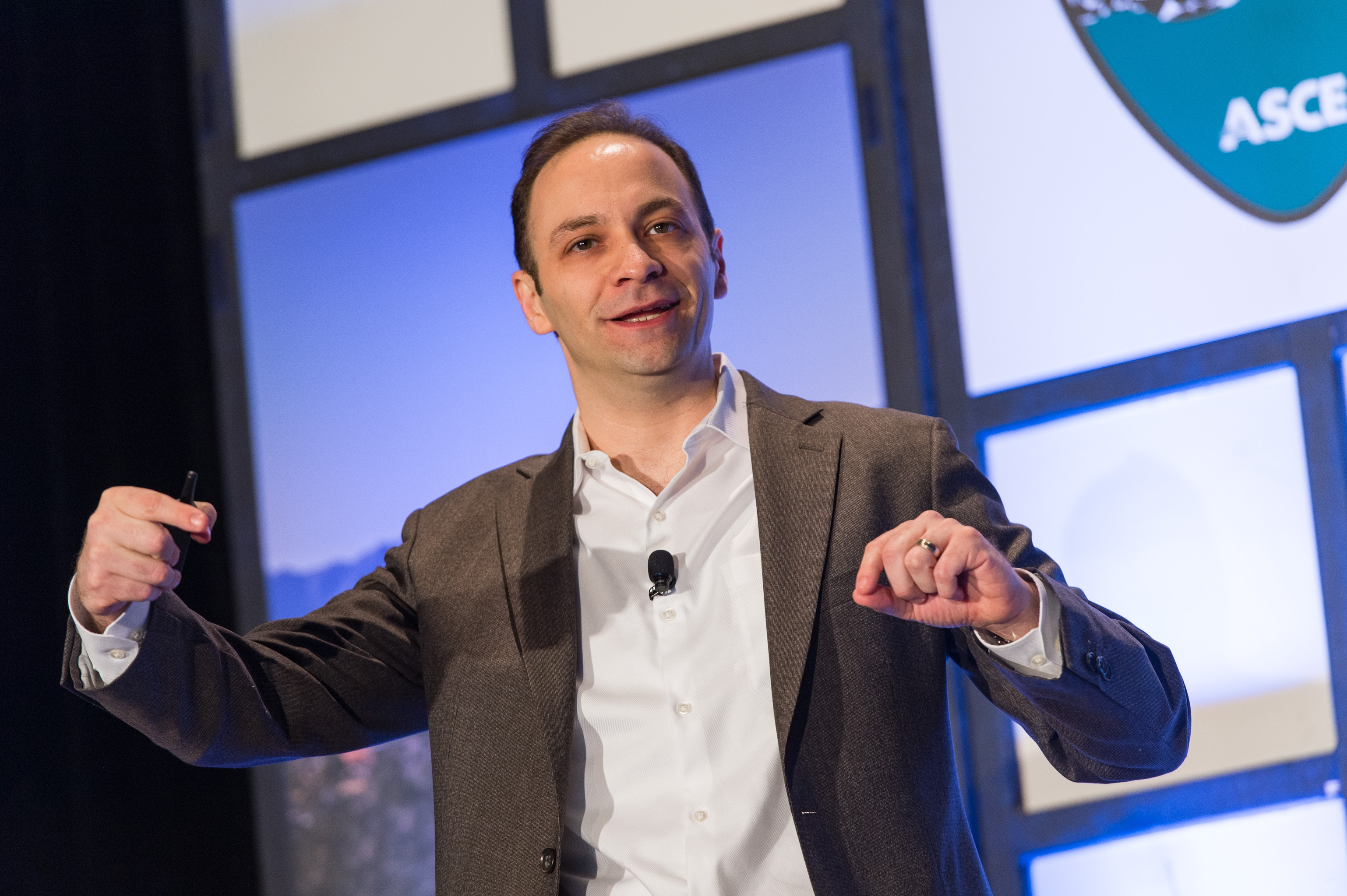
- Born: 1977 (age 48–49)
- Education: University of Rochester; City University of New York
- Occupations: Author, speaker
- Writing career
- Genre: Non-fiction
- Subjects: Business, psychology
- Website: www.ronfriedmanphd.com ignite80.com

Ron Friedman (born 1977) is a psychologist and behavior change expert who specializes in human motivation. He is a frequent contributor to the Harvard Business Review, CNN, Fast Company, and Psychology Today, as well as the author of the best-selling non-fiction book The Best Place to Work: The Art and Science of Creating an Extraordinary Workplace.

== Education ==
Friedman received a doctorate in Social and Personality Psychology from the University of Rochester in 2007. He holds a Masters in Social-Personality Psychology from the University of Rochester and a bachelor's degree in Political Science from the City University of New York.

== Career ==
Friedman served on the faculties of Nazareth College, Hobart and William Smith Colleges, and the University of Rochester, where he received the Edward Peck Curtis Award for Excellence in Teaching.

His academic research centered on non-conscious influence on achievement motivation.

He left academia to work with Barack Obama's chief pollster, where he helped design innovative research techniques for gauging public opinion.

In 2012, he founded the Friedman Strategy Group, a consultancy that offers marketing strategies developed from qualitative and quantitative research that identifies the real drivers behind people's decisions.

In 2014, Friedman launched ignite80, an education company that teaches people how to use scientific insights to live happier, healthier, more productive lives. By delivering online training, coaching services, and live keynotes, ignite80 teaches leaders evidence-based practices for achieving top performance.

In 2016, Friedman hosted The Peak Work Performance Summit, where he interviewed over 30 of the world's best-known productivity experts including David Allen, Daniel H. Pink, Susan Cain, Tom Rath, Adam Grant, and many others. The second annual Peak Work Performance Summit is planned for April 2017.

Friedman frequently delivers keynotes and workshops on topics such as “What the World’s Best Workplaces Do Differently”, “The Science of Getting Things Done”, “Motivating Excellence” and “How to Turn Your Team into a Creative Powerhouse”.

== Research and publications ==
Popular accounts of Friedman's research have appeared on NPR and in major newspapers including The New York Times, The Washington Post, The Boston Globe, Vancouver Post, The Globe and Mail, The Guardian, as well as magazines such as Men's Health, Shape, and Allure. His research covers a variety of workplace topics, including the science of workplace excellence, achieving top performance, and the connection between health, happiness, and productivity.

Friedman is also a regular contributor to the Harvard Business Review, penning widely read articles such as "How to Spend the Last 10 Minutes of Your Day", "9 Productivity Tips From People Who Write About Productivity", and "Regular Exercise is Part of Your Job", where he covers engaging and counter-intuitive ideas such as lowering the temperature, leaving tasks unfinished, and leveraging team sports in order to work at your peak. While all are research-backed claims, Friedman's articles go past the science of optimum performance to bring actionable tips to improve everything from your sleep to your credibility at work.

Friedman's first book, The Best Place to Work: The Art and Science of Creating an Extraordinary Workplace, published in 2014, used the "latest research from the fields of motivation, creativity, behavioral economics, neuroscience, and management," to understand what makes people successful at work. The book presents stories and research in an effort to provide leaders with techniques "to promote smarter thinking, greater innovation, and stronger performance." Among the many surprising insights, Friedman explains how learning to think like a hostage negotiator can help you defuse a workplace argument, why placing a fish bowl near your desk can elevate your thinking, and how incorporating strategic distractions into your schedule can help you reach smarter decisions. Along the way, the book introduces the inventor who created the cubicle, the president who brought down the world's most dangerous criminal, and the teenager who single-handedly transformed professional tennis—vivid stories that offer unexpected revelations on achieving workplace excellence.

The Best Place to Work is available in print, eBook, and in an unabridged audio edition narrated by Walter Dixon, was an INC. Magazine Best Business Book of the Year and was hailed as a “must read” from the Library Journal. Publishers Weekly called the book "an energetic, conversational look at what really makes an office environment tick."

Friedman's second book, Decoding Greatness: How the Best in the World Reverse Engineer Success, was published in June 2021 by Simon & Schuster. In it, Friedman uses examples of top performers—from Agatha Christie to Andy Warhol, Barack Obama to Serena Williams—and research on pattern recognition, skill acquisition, and creative genius, to reveal the power of reverse engineering as a tool for achieving success.

== Bibliography ==
=== Books ===
- Friedman, Ron (2014). The Best Place to Work: The Art and Science of Creating an Extraordinary Workplace. ISBN 978-0-399-16559-7.
- Friedman, Ron (2021). Decoding Greatness: How the Best in the World Reverse Engineer Success. Simon and Schuster. ISBN 978-1-9821-3579-9.

=== Audio ===
- Your Brain's Ideal Schedule. Harvard Business Review. March 2014.

=== Selected articles ===
- "How The Science Of Love Can Make You A Smarter Marketer". Forbes. December 2013.
- "Why The Last Five Years Of Your Life Have Disappeared". Fast Company. July 2014.
- "Work-life balance is dead". CNN. December 2014.
- Friedman, Ron (March 2015). "5 Myths of Great Workplaces". Harvard Business Review.
- "Does more money make you happier at work?". CNN. April 2015.
- "Get More Done By Scheduling to Your Strengths". Psychology Today. December 2015.
- Friedman, Ron (December 2015). "9 Productivity Tips from People Who Write About Productivity". Harvard Business Review.
- "9 Things Productive People Do Differently". Psychology Today. January 2016.
