= Nazareth Golden Flyers men's volleyball =

American college volleyball team

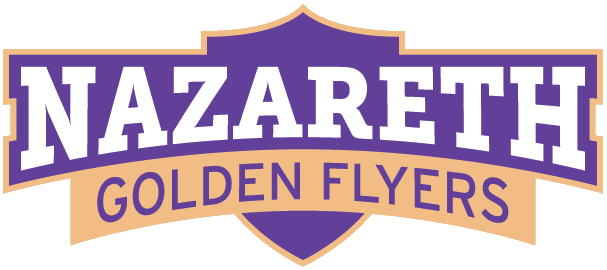
- University: Nazareth University
- Head coach: Cal Wickens (19th season)
- Conference: UVC
- Location: Pittsford, New York, US
- Home arena: Kidera Gymnasium (capacity: 1,200)
- Nickname: Golden Flyers
- Colors

NCAA tournament champion
- 2011

NCAA tournament runner-up
- 2013

NCAA tournament semifinal
- 2010, 2011, 2013, 2015

NCAA tournament appearance
- 2010, 2011, 2012, 2013, 2015

Conference tournament champion
- NECVA: 2010, 2011; UVC: 2012, 2013

The Nazareth University Golden Flyers men's volleyball team is the NCAA Division III volleyball team of Nazareth University. The Golden Flyers won the Molten Division III Men's Invitational Volleyball Championship Tournament in 2011. The Golden Flyers lost in the finals of the NCAA Men's Division III Volleyball Championship in 2013 and both matches were against Springfield College.

== Yearly results ==
Year	Head coach	Overall record	Postseason/notes
2005	Cal Wickens	10-13	First season
2006	Cal Wickens	20-9	
2007	Cal Wickens	23-7	
2008	Cal Wickens	28-7	
2009	Cal Wickens	28-5	
2010	Cal Wickens	19-16	Molten Division III Men's Invitational Volleyball Championship Tournament Semi-Final
2011	Cal Wickens	31-3	Molten Division III Men's Invitational Volleyball Championship Tournament Champions
2012	Cal Wickens	27-9	NCAA Men's Division III Volleyball Championship Opening-Round
2013	Cal Wickens	36-2	NCAA Men's Division III Volleyball Championship Runner-Up
2014	Cal Wickens	15-10	
2015	Cal Wickens	28-7	NCAA Men's Division III Volleyball Championship Semi-Final
2016	Cal Wickens	26-9	
2017	Cal Wickens	21-13	
2018	Cal Wickens	17-13	
2019	Cal Wickens	15-11	
2020	Cal Wickens	10-13	Shortened season due to COVID-19
2021	Cal Wickens	5-7	Shortened season due to COVID-19
2022	Cal Wickens	18-9	
2023	Cal Wickens	20-6	Nationally Ranked 14th
2024	Cal Wickens	20-10	Finished Nationally Ranked 14th
2025	Cal Wickens	19-11	Finished Nationally Ranked 13th United Volleyball Conference Runner Up
Total		426-190	1 National Championship (2011)

== All-Americans ==
Naz has had 12 First Team selections, 12 Second Team selections, 1 Player of the Year and 1 Newcomer of the Year. Coach Wickens is a two time Coach of the Year (2011 & 2013) and his assistant Kyle Salisbury was the 2011 Assistant Coach of the Year.

Year	1st Team All-Americans
2009	Frank Leahy
2011	Ellis Walsh; Hans Schroeder
2012	Ellis Walsh
2013	EJ Wells-Spicer(POY); Luke Lawatsch; Robert Kraft
2015	Luke Lawatsch; Tim Zyburt
2016	Tim Zyburt
2023	Owen Wickens
2024	Owen Wickens

Year	2nd Team All-Americans
2007	Tom Maving
2008	Tom Maving, Frank Leahy
2009	Billy Gimello
2011	Billy Gimello, EJWells-Spicer
2012	Rob Kraft
2013	Tim Zyburt
2014	Luke Lawatsch
2015	Chris Mahan
2016	Tom Keisling
2023	Seth Terzo
