= East Rochester Junior-Senior High School =

Location
- 200 Woodbine Ave; East Rochester, New York 14445; United States
- Coordinates: 43.1075°N 77.4925°W

Information
- Type: Public
- Motto: Tradition and Vision
- School district: East Rochester Union Free School District
- NCES School ID: 360993000767
- Principal: Alicia Shippy
- Teaching staff: 53.21 (on an FTE basis)
- Grades: 6-12
- Enrollment: 512 (2023-2024)
- Student to teacher ratio: 9.62
- Campus: Suburban: Large
- Colors: Brown, White and Orange
- Mascot: Bombers
- Yearbook: Gagashoan
- Website: juniorseniorhs.erschools.org

East Rochester Junior-Senior High School (ERHS) is a public high school serving 596 students in the seventh through twelfth grade in East Rochester in the U.S. state of New York and is part of the East Rochester Union Free School District. The student–teacher ratio is 10 to 1. The principal was Casey Van Harssel, and is currently Alicia Shippy.

== School information ==
On February 3, 2007, a hydrogen fuel cell was installed at the high school, providing self-generated electricity to the school.
