= United Volleyball Conference =

College sports conference, 2010–2026

- Association: NCAA
- Founded: August 31, 2010
- Folded: 2026
- Commissioner: Chuck Mitrano (since 2010)
- Sports fielded: 1
- Division: Division III
- No. of teams: 8
- Headquarters: Rochester, New York
- Website: TheUVC.org

The United Volleyball Conference was a National Collegiate Athletic Association Division III men's volleyball conference located in the northeastern United States. Formed in August 2010 with play starting in January 2011, the conference operated out of the same offices as the all-sports Empire 8 league, though the two remained separate entities.

The UVC disbanded following the 2026 season as part of an agreement between it, the New England Volleyball Conference (NEVC; an offshoot of the former all-sports New England Collegiate Conference), and three all-sports conferences—the Conference of New England (CNE), Empire 8, and New England Women's and Men's Athletic Conference (NEWMAC). CNE and NEWMAC started sponsoring men's volleyball in the spring 2027 season, and the Empire 8 elevated the sport to full NCAA championship status at that time. Of the final UVC members, three moved men's volleyball to the Empire 8 (all being full members of that conference), four joined NEWMAC men's volleyball (one as a full member and three as affiliates), and Hobart became a men's volleyball affiliate of the Allegheny Mountain Collegiate Conference.

== Teams ==
=== Final members ===
The league had 8 members in its final 2026 season.

Note that because NCAA men's volleyball is a spring sport, the year of joining is the calendar year before the first season of competition.

Institution	Location	Founded	Joined	Type	Enrollment (Note: Undergraduate enrollment.)	Nickname	Primary conference	Current volleyball conference
Elmira College	Elmira, New York	1855	2010	Private	1,170	Soaring Eagles	Empire 8	
Hobart College	Geneva, New York	1797	2024	Episcopal	905	Statesmen	Liberty	AMCC
Massachusetts Institute of Technology	Cambridge, Massachusetts	1861	2013	Private	4,602	Engineers	NEWMAC	
Nazareth University	Pittsford, New York	1924	2010	Private	2,034	Golden Flyers	Empire 8	
State University of New York at New Paltz (New Paltz)	New Paltz, New York	1828	2010	Public	6,717	Hawks	SUNYAC	NEWMAC
New York University (NYU)	New York, New York	1831	2010	Private	26,733	Violets	UAA	NEWMAC
St. John Fisher University	Rochester, New York	1948	2017	Private	2,700	Cardinals	Empire 8	
Vassar College	Poughkeepsie, New York	1861	2010	Private	2,450	Brewers	Liberty	NEWMAC

=== Other former members ===
Institution	Location	Joined	Left	Type	Nickname	Current volleyball conference
Bard College	Annandale-on-Hudson, New York	1860	2010	Private	Raptors	CNE
D'Youville College (Note: Known as D'Youville University since 2022.)	Buffalo, New York	2010	2014	Private	Spartans (Note: Nickname changed to Saints in 2020.)	NEC (Note: Division I conference that competes in the National Collegiate division of men's volleyball (combined Divisions I and II).)
Hilbert College	Hamburg, New York	2010	2014	Private	Hawks	AMCC
Medaille College	Buffalo, New York	2010	2014	Private	Mavericks	None (Note: Medaille closed in August 2023.)
Penn State Erie, The Behrend College (Penn State Behrend)	Erie, Pennsylvania	2011	2017	Public–private hybrid	Lions	AMCC
The Sage Colleges (Sage) (Note: The Sage Colleges, which were recognized by the UVC, NCAA, and the state of New York as a single institution, consolidated its three colleges as one and rebranded as Russell Sage College in July 2020. Russell Sage consisted of three components—the formerly women-only namesake college, the coeducational Sage College of Albany (SCA), and the Sage Graduate Schools. During its UVC tenure, Russell Sage's team consisted predominantly of former SCA students, since SCA was the only RSC component that enrolled male undergraduates.)	Albany, New York (Note: Russell Sage has campuses in both Albany and Troy, New York, but the former SCA operated only in Albany.)	2017	2020	Private	Gators	Empire 8
Stevens Institute of Technology (Stevens)	Hoboken, New Jersey	2010	2019	Private	Ducks	MAC
State University of New York Institute of Technology (SUNY IT) (Note: Merged into the SUNY Polytechnic Institute, aka SUNY Poly, in 2014. SUNY Poly inherited the former SUNY IT athletic program.)	Marcy, New York	2010	2013	Public	Wildcats	CNE

== Championship history ==
Season	Regular season	Tournament
2011	Stevens (East); Nazareth (West) (Note: Top seed in conference tournament.)	Nazareth
2012	NYU (East); Medaille (West)	Nazareth
2013	Nazareth	Nazareth
2014	Nazareth	New Paltz
2015	Stevens	Stevens
2016	New Paltz	New Paltz
2017	Vassar	NYU
2018	Stevens, New Paltz	Stevens
2019	Stevens, New Paltz	New Paltz
2020	None	Canceled
2021	New Paltz	Vassar
2022	New Paltz	St. John Fisher
2023	Vassar	Vassar
2024	Vassar	NYU
2025	NYU	NYU
2026	New Paltz	MIT

== See also ==
- Volleyball
