= Molten Division III Men's Invitational Volleyball Championship Tournament =

Molten Div. III Tournament logo

The Molten Division III Men's Invitational Volleyball Championship Tournament was a championship event for NCAA Division III men's volleyball, founded in 1997 and operating through 2011. While the NCAA has sponsored an annual national championship for men's volleyball since 1970 (NCAA Men's National Collegiate Volleyball Championship), programs from all three divisions competed for just four berths in the yearly tournament. Through 2011, no Division III program had earned a berth or been selected to participate in the NCAA National Collegiate Men's Volleyball Championship. Molten is the official volleyball of the NCAA championships.

The Molten Championship was discontinued after its 2011 edition when the NCAA announced it would start an official Division III championship in 2012.

== Tournament results ==
Year	Champion	Runner-up	Third place	Fourth place	Score	Venue
2011	Nazareth	Springfield	Carthage	Baruch	3-1	Nazareth
2010	Springfield	UC Santa Cruz	Carthage	Nazareth	3-1	Carthage
2009	Juniata	Stevens	UC Santa Cruz	Ramapo	?	Ramapo
2008	Springfield	Vassar	UC Santa Cruz	Juniata	?	Springfield
2007	Juniata	Carthage	Springfield	Stevens	?	Juniata
2006	Juniata	UC Santa Cruz	Stevens	Rivier	?	Stevens
2005	Juniata	Carthage	Stevens	Medaille	?	Stevens
2004	Juniata	Medaille	UC Santa Cruz	Eastern Mennonite	?	Eastern Mennonite
2003	Springfield	Juniata	La Verne	Stevens	3-1	Juniata
2002	Springfield	La Verne	NYU	Lehman	3-2	NYU
2001	Springfield	D'Youville	Clarke	Vassar	3-1	Springfield
2000	UC San Diego	NYU	D'Youville	Stevens	3-0	Stevens
1999	La Verne	D'Youville	Clarke	Juniata	?	Clarke
1998	Juniata	La Verne	Springfield	Eastern Mennonite	?	Springfield
1997	Springfield	New Jersey Tech	Juniata College	UC San Diego	?	Juniata

== Tournament final appearances ==
- 7 appearances: Juniata (1998, 2003, 2004, 2005, 2006, 2007, 2009)
- 6 appearances: Springfield (1997, 2001, 2002, 2003, 2008, 2010)
- 3 appearances: La Verne (1998, 1999, 2002)
- 2 appearances:
  - Carthage (2005, 2007)
  - D'Youville (1999, 2001);
  - UC Santa Cruz (2006, 2010)
- 1 appearance:
  - Nazareth (2011)
  - New Jersey Tech (1997)
  - NYU (2000)
  - Stevens (2009)
  - UC San Diego (2000)
  - Vassar (2008)
  - Medaille (2004)

== Tournament titles ==
- 6 titles:
  - Juniata (1998, 2004, 2005, 2006, 2007, 2009)
  - Springfield (1997, 2001, 2002, 2003, 2008, 2010)
- 1 title:
  - Nazareth (2011)
  - La Verne (1999)
  - UC San Diego (2000)

== Tournament appearances ==
- 10 appearances: Juniata (1997, 1998, 1999, 2003, 2004, 2005, 2006, 2007, 2008, 2009)
- 8 appearances: Springfield (1997, 1998, 2001, 2002, 2003, 2007, 2008, 2010)
- 6 appearances: Stevens (2000, 2003, 2005, 2006, 2007, 2009)
- 5 appearances: UC Santa Cruz (2004, 2006, 2008, 2009, 2010)
- 4 appearances:

La Verne (1998, 1999, 2002, 2003)

Carthage (2005, 2007, 2010, 2011)

- 3 appearances:

D'Youville (1999, 2000, 2001)

- 2 appearances:

Clarke (1999, 2001)

Eastern Mennonite (1998, 2004)

Medaille (2004, 2005)

Nazareth (2010, 2011)

NYU (2000, 2002)

UC San Diego (1997, 2000)

Vassar (2001, 2008)

- 1 appearance:

Lehman (2002)

New Jersey Tech (1997)

Ramapo (2009)

Rivier (2006)

== Championship committee ==
In its final season, the Molten Division III Men's Invitational Volleyball Championship committee consisted of:

Kathy DeBoer (AVCA executive director)
Doug Beal (USA Volleyball chief executive officer)
Ivan Marquez (EIVA Commissioner/EIVA representative)
Bob Newcomb (UC Irvine/at-large representative)
John Speraw (UC Irvine/AVCA board of directors men’s representative)
Jerry Matacotta (NECVA)
Stuart Robinson (SUNY New Paltz athletics director/NECVA)
Dan Harris (Milwaukee School of Engineering athletics director/Midwest-West representative).

== See also ==
- NCAA men's volleyball tournament
- NCAA Division III men's volleyball tournament, the replacement for the Molten Championship
- NECVA Championship Tournament
