= NCAA Division III men's volleyball tournament =

American collegiate volleyball tournament

- Association: NCAA
- Sport: College indoor volleyball
- Founded: 2012; 14 years ago
- Division: Division III
- No. of teams: 19
- Country: United States
- Most recent champion: Springfield (6th)
- Most titles: Springfield (6)
- Website: NCAA.com

The NCAA Division III men's volleyball tournament is the annual tournament organized by the National Collegiate Athletic Association (NCAA), the main governing body for U.S. college sports, to determine the national champions of collegiate indoor volleyball among its Division III members. It has been held every year since 2012, except for 2020 (this was the newest NCAA championship from 2012 to 2016, when a beach volleyball championship was ended.

Springfield have been the most successful program, with six titles, and are the current defending champions.

== History ==
The idea of a Division III championship was first floated by several figures in the Eastern Intercollegiate Volleyball Association in the late 1980s, but was long dormant because of NCAA participation rules—50 schools must sponsor a sport before a national championship tournament can be officially sanctioned. The main impetus for growth in Division III volleyball had been an unofficial D-III championship tournament known as the Molten Invitational, started in 1997. In 2010, the required number of programs was reached, leading to the creation of the D-III championship.

== Format ==
The Division III championship began in 2012 with nine teams and has steadily expanded with the growth of D-III men's volleyball. The most recent expansion came for the 2019 season, with the field going from 12 to 14 teams. This differs from the top-level NCAA Men's National Collegiate Volleyball Championship, which involved four teams through the 2013 tournament and expanded to six teams for 2014 and seven for 2018. Like the National Collegiate Championship, the Division III championship is a knockout tournament, with best-of-5-set matches. The current tournament format features six first-round matches, with the winners joining the top two seeds in the quarterfinals.

The tournament was not held in 2020 due to COVID-19, and with a significant number of schools opting out of competition in 2021 due to the still-ongoing pandemic, that year's field was reduced to 12 teams from the intended 14. The field has since been expanded twice—to 16 in 2022 and the current 19 in 2025.

== Results ==
| Year | National champion | Score | Runner-up | City and venue | | Attendance Finals/Total | Host school/organization |
|---|---|---|---|---|---|---|---|
| 2012 | Springfield (33–5) | 3–0 | Carthage (29–6) | Springfield, MA | Blake Arena | 1,600; 5,723 | Springfield |
| 2013 | Springfield (32–3) | 3–0 | Nazareth (36–2) | Pittsford, NY (Note: The championship was originally scheduled for the MIT campus in Cambridge, Massachusetts. It was moved in the wake of the Boston Marathon bombings.) | Kidera Gymnasium | 1,000; 2,676 | Nazareth |
| 2014 | Springfield (27–8) | 3–0 | Juniata (29–5) | Huntingdon, PA | Kennedy Sports Center | 816; 3,022 | Juniata |
| 2015 | Stevens (31–4) | 3–0 | Springfield (25–7) | Hoboken, NJ | Canavan Arena | 1,126; 2,506 | Stevens |
| 2016 | New Paltz (33–2) | 3–1 | Springfield (28–4) | Pittsford, NY | Kidera Gymnasium | 914; 3,364 | Nazareth |
| 2017 | Springfield (33–5) | 3–1 | New Paltz (27–9) | Springfield, MA | Blake Arena | 2,000; 6,099 | Springfield |
| 2018 | Springfield (31–2) | 3–0 | Stevens (27–5) | Kenosha, WI | Tarble Arena | 550 | Carthage |
| 2019 | New Paltz (28–7) | 3–1 | UC Santa Cruz (21–17) | Union, NJ | Harwood Arena | 322 | Kean |
| 2020 | Canceled due to COVID-19 | | | Dubuque, IA | Lillis Athletic & Wellness Center | N/A | Loras |
| 2021 | Carthage (23–0) | 3–2 | Benedictine (IL) (16-4) | Salem, VA (Note: The championship was originally scheduled for Kidera Gymnasium at the campus of Nazareth College in Pittsford, New York. It was moved due to COVID-19 issues.) | Salem Civic Center | 250 | Continental Volleyball Conference |
| 2022 | Carthage (24-3) | 3–1 | Springfield (29–2) | Kenosha, WI | Tarble Arena | 2,175 | Carthage |
| 2023 | Stevens (35–3) | 3–1 | North Central (IL) (25–4) | Owings Mills, MD | Owings Mills Gymnasium | 267 | Stevenson |
| 2024 | Cal Lutheran (26–5) | 3–0 | Vassar (26–8) | Dubuque, IA | Lillis Athletic & Wellness Center | 275 | Loras |
| 2025 | Southern Virginia (35–1) | 3–0 | Springfield (25–5) | Salem, VA | Cregger Center | 1,202 | Roanoke/Old Dominion Athletic Conference |
| 2026 | Springfield (25-3) | 3–0 | Carthage (25-4) | Springfield, MA | Blake Arena | 2,000 | Springfield |
| 2027 | | | | Salisbury, MD | Wicomico Youth and Civic Center | | |

== Champions ==
| Team | Titles | Years |
|---|---|---|
| Springfield | 6 | 2012, 2013, 2014, 2017, 2018, 2026 |
| Stevens | 2 | 2015, 2023 |
| Carthage | 2 | 2021, 2022 |
| New Paltz | 2 | 2016, 2019 |
| Cal Lutheran | 1 | 2024 |
| Southern Virginia | 1 | 2025 |

== See also ==
- NCAA Men's Volleyball Championships (Divisions I and II)
- NAIA Men's Volleyball Championship
