= Battle Creek Central High School =

Location
- 100 West Van Buren Street; Battle Creek, Michigan 49017; United States
- 42.323643°N 85.183003°W

Information
- Type: Public high school
- Motto: "Believe in the Change"
- Established: 1908
- School district: Battle Creek Public Schools
- Superintendent: Kimberly Carter
- Principal: Tyler Gilland
- Teaching staff: 54.20 (FTE)
- Grades: 9–12
- Enrollment: 1,036 (2023-2024)
- Student to teacher ratio: 19.11
- Campus type: Urban
- Colors: Navy blue gold
- Fight song: "Bearcats Go"
- Athletics conference: Southwestern Michigan Athletic Conference
- Nickname: Bearcats
- Rival: Kalamazoo Central High School
- Yearbook: Paean
- Website: www.battlecreekpublicschools.org/schools/bcchs/

Battle Creek Central High School (BCCHS) is a public high school in Battle Creek, Michigan, United States. It is the sole high school in the Battle Creek Public Schools district, and one of four public high schools in Battle Creek.

== Demographics ==
The demographic breakdown of the 1,041 students enrolled in 2018-19 was:

- Male - 51.9%
- Female - 48.1%
- Native American - 0.6%
- Asian - 4.5%
- Black - 36.8%
- Hispanic - 13.8%
- White - 34.3%
- Multiracial - 12.0%

== Notable alumni ==
- Tom Beard, National Football League player.
- Basil W. Brown, former member of the Michigan senate
- Darcy C. Coyle, former President of Nichols College and Upper Iowa University
- Harry A. DeMaso, former member of the Michigan legislature
- Francis E. Griffin (1910–1973), architect in Detroit
- John Kitzmiller, former film actor
- Barbara Lett-Simmons, former politician
- Tony McGee, NFL player with the Washington Redskins and Chicago Bears
- Mike Nofs, politician
- Joe Schwarz, former member of the United States House of Representatives
- Tauren Wells
