= WXRB =

- Dudley, Massachusetts; United States
- Broadcast area: Dudley–Webster, Massachusetts; Thompson–Quinebaug, Connecticut
- Frequency: 95.1 MHz
- Branding: The Golden 95.1

Programming
- Language: English
- Format: Oldies

Ownership
- Owner: WXRB-FM Educational Broadcasting, Inc.

History
- First air date: 1975
- Former call signs: WNRC (1975–2005)
- Former frequencies: 91.1 MHz
- Call sign meaning: A tribute to XERB

Technical information
- Licensing authority: FCC
- Facility ID: 48827
- Class: D
- ERP: 60 watts
- HAAT: 35 meters (115 ft)
- Transmitter coordinates: 42°2′41.2″N 71°55′51.3″W

Links
- Public license information: Public file; LMS
- Webcast: Listen live
- Website: wxrbfm.org

WXRB (95.1 FM, "The Golden 95.1") is a non-commercial, educational radio station located in Dudley, Massachusetts, licensed by the Federal Communications Commission (FCC) to WXRB-FM Educational Broadcasting, Inc. (a non-profit organization). Its studios and transmitting facilities are located on the campus of Nichols College, which previously owned the station as WNRC until a stronger signal at 97.5 MHz signed on in February 2005 as WNRC-LP. The college later sold the original WNRC to Peter Q. George, the station's engineer, who had been programming 95.1 after the frequency swap. WXRB transmits in stereo and with RBDS.

The station is named (in tribute) for XERB ("The Mighty 1090"), the 50,000-watt Mexican border blaster radio station from which famous disc jockey Wolfman Jack (Robert Weston Smith) broadcast in the mid-1960s and early 1970s. George has said that he is a lifelong fan of Wolfman Jack.

WXRB, (one of the first non-commercial all-oldies radio stations in North America) features a 24/7 automated all-oldies format, in stereo, focusing on the years 1954 to 1979, similar to the original "R-KO-matic" (pronounced "ARKO-matic") automated music format at WRKO-FM and WROR (now WBZ-FM) in Boston, Massachusetts. WXRB frequently carries sports programming produced by the students at WNRC-LP, featuring the Nichols Bison sports teams. Two traditions that continue to endure on WXRB are the yearly broadcast of Orson Welles and The Mercury Theatre On The Air's original 1938 presentation of "The War of the Worlds" every Halloween night and the yearly airing of Arlo Guthrie's "Alice's Restaurant Massacree" twice on Thanksgiving Day.
