= Nichols Bison football =

College football team

- First season: 1932; 94 years ago
- Athletic director: Jack Hayes
- Head coach: Vinny Marino; 2nd season, 5–15 (.250)
- Location: Dudley, Massachusetts
- Stadium: Vendetti Field (capacity: 2,000)
- NCAA division: Division III
- Conference: CNE
- Colors: Black and green
- All-time record: 267–361–11 (.426)

Conference championships
- 5 NEFC (1973–1976, 1978)

Division championships
- 1 NEFC Boyd Division (2001)
- Mascot: Bison
- Website: nicholsathletics.com

The Nichols Bison football team represents Nichols College in college football at the NCAA Division III level. The Bison are members of the Conference of New England (CNE), fielding its team in the CNE since 1972 when it was named the New England Football Conference (NEFC). The Bison play their home games at Vendetti Field in Dudley, Massachusetts.

Their head coach is Vinny Marino, who will take over the position for the 2024 season.

== Conference affiliations ==
- Independent (1932–1942, 1947–1971)
- New England Football Conference (1972–1991)
- Eastern Collegiate Football Conference (1992–1997)
- New England Football Conference / Commonwealth Coast football / Conference of New England (1998–present)

== Championships ==
=== Conference championships ===
Nichols claims 5 conference titles.

Year	Conference	Overall Record	Conference Record	Coach
1973	New England Football Conference	8–1	4–0	Michael Vendetti
1974	New England Football Conference	7–1–1	6–0–1	Michael Vendetti
1975†	New England Football Conference	6–2	6–2	Michael Vendetti
1976	New England Football Conference	8–1	7–1	Michael Vendetti
1978†	New England Football Conference	6–2	6–2	Michael Vendetti

† Co-champions

=== Division championships ===
Nichols claims 1 division title, which came in 2001.

Year	Division	Coach	Overall Record	Conference Record	Opponent	CG result
2001	NEFC Boyd	Bill Carven	6–4	5–0	Westfield State	L 0–12

== Postseason games ==
=== Bowl games ===
Nichols has participated in one bowl game, and has a record of 0–1.

Season	Coach	Bowl	Opponent	Result
2001	Bill Carven	ECAC Bowl	Western Connecticut	L 10–63

== List of head coaches ==
=== Key ===
Key to symbols in coaches list
General		Overall		Conference		Postseason (Note: Although the first Rose Bowl Game was played in 1902, it has been continuously played since the 1916 game, and is recognized as the oldest bowl game by the NCAA. "—" indicates any season prior to 1916 when postseason games were not played.)	
No.	Order of coaches (Note: A running total of the number of head coaches, with coaches who served separate tenures being counted only once. Interim head coaches are represented with "Int" and are not counted in the running total. "—" indicates the team played but either without a coach or no coach is on record. "X" indicates an interim year without play.)	GC	Games coached	CW	Conference wins	PW	Postseason wins
DC	Division championships	OW	Overall wins	CL	Conference losses	PL	Postseason losses
CC	Conference championships	OL	Overall losses	CT	Conference ties	PT	Postseason ties
NC	National championships	OT	Overall ties (Note: Overtime rules in college football were introduced in 1996, making ties impossible in the period since.)	C%	Conference winning percentage		
†	Elected to the College Football Hall of Fame	O%	Overall winning percentage (Note: When computing the win–loss percentage, a tie counts as half a win and half a loss.)				

=== Coaches ===
List of head football coaches showing season(s) coached, overall records, and conference records
No.	Name	Season(s)	GC	OW	OL	OT	O%	CW	CL	CT	C%
1	Unknown	1932–1942	—	—	—	—	—	–	–	–	–
2	Hal Chalmers	1947–1958	68	25	38	5	0.404	–	–	–	–
3	Harry Gaffney	1959–1961	17	7	10	0	0.412	–	–	–	–
4	Michael Vendetti	1962–1985	191	103	83	5	0.552	65	43	2	0.600
5	Jack Charney	1986–1992	63	34	28	1	0.548	20	20	1	0.500
6	Jim Crowley	1993–1995	27	3	24	0	0.111	2	17	0	0.105
7	Jim Foster	1996–1998	29	9	20	0	0.310	5	12	0	0.294
8	Bill Carven	1999–2010	115	51	64	0	0.443	34	41	0	0.455
9	Kevin Loney	2011–2013	29	2	27	0	0.069	1	20	0	0.048
10	Dale Olmsted	2014–2023	90	30	60	0	0.333	12	44	0	0.214
11	Vinny Marino	2024–present	20	5	15	0	0.250	2	10	0	0.167

== Year-by-year results since 1947 ==
National champions	Conference champions	Bowl game berth	Playoff berth

Season	Year	Head coach	Association	Division	Conference	Record							Postseason	Final ranking
Season	Year	Head coach	Association	Division	Conference	Overall			Conference				Postseason	Final ranking
Season	Year	Head coach	Association	Division	Conference	Win	Loss	Tie	Finish	Win	Loss	Tie	Postseason	Final ranking
Nichols Bison
1947	1947	Hal Chalmers	NCAA	—	Independent	2	2	3					—	—
1948	1948	Hal Chalmers	NCAA	—	Independent	5	1	0					—	—
1949	1949	Hal Chalmers	NCAA	—	Independent	6	0	0					—	—
1950	1950	Hal Chalmers	NCAA	—	Independent	1	5	0					—	—
1951	1951	Hal Chalmers	NCAA	—	Independent	5	0	1					—	—
1952	1952	Hal Chalmers	NCAA	—	Independent	1	6	0					—	—
1953	1953	Hal Chalmers	NCAA	—	Independent	1	4	1					—	—
1954	1954	Hal Chalmers	NCAA	—	Independent	1	4	0					—	—
1955	1955	Hal Chalmers	NCAA	—	Independent	0	4	0					—	—
1956	1956	Hal Chalmers	NCAA	College Division	Independent	1	5	0					—	—
1957	1957	Hal Chalmers	NCAA	College Division	Independent	0	3	0					—	—
1958	1958	Hal Chalmers	NCAA	College Division	Independent	2	4	0					—	—
1959	1959	Harry Gaffney	NCAA	College Division	Independent	3	3	0					—	—
1960	1960	Harry Gaffney	NCAA	College Division	Independent	2	4	0					—	—
1961	1961	Harry Gaffney	NCAA	College Division	Independent	2	3	0					—	—
1962	1962	Michael Vendetti	NCAA	College Division	Independent	3	3	0					—	—
1963	1963	Michael Vendetti	NCAA	College Division	Independent	0	6	0					—	—
1964	1964	Michael Vendetti	NCAA	College Division	Independent	4	2	1					—	—
1965	1965	Michael Vendetti	NCAA	College Division	Independent	6	1	0					—	—
1966	1966	Michael Vendetti	NCAA	College Division	Independent	3	3	0					—	—
1967	1967	Michael Vendetti	NCAA	College Division	Independent	2	5	0					—	—
1968	1968	Michael Vendetti	NCAA	College Division	Independent	4	4	0					—	—
1969	1969	Michael Vendetti	NCAA	College Division	Independent	0	7	0					—	—
1970	1970	Michael Vendetti	NCAA	College Division	Independent	3	4	0					—	—
1971	1971	Michael Vendetti	NCAA	College Division	Independent	4	3	1					—	—
1972	1972	Michael Vendetti	NCAA	College Division	NEFC	5	2	1	4th	3	2	0	—	—
1973	1973	Michael Vendetti	NCAA	Division III	NEFC	8	1	0	1st	4	0	0	Conference champions	—
1974	1974	Michael Vendetti	NCAA	Division III	NEFC	7	1	1	1st	6	0	1	Conference champions	—
1975	1975	Michael Vendetti	NCAA	Division III	NEFC	6	2	0	T–1st	6	2	0	Conference co-champions	—
1976	1976	Michael Vendetti	NCAA	Division III	NEFC	8	1	0	1st	7	1	0	Conference champions	—
1977	1977	Michael Vendetti	NCAA	Division III	NEFC	5	4	0	T–5th	4	4	0	—	—
1978	1978	Michael Vendetti	NCAA	Division III	NEFC	6	2	0	T–1st	6	2	0	Conference co-champions	—
1979	1979	Michael Vendetti	NCAA	Division III	NEFC	6	3	0	T–2nd	6	3	0	—	—
1980	1980	Michael Vendetti	NCAA	Division III	NEFC	3	5	1	8th	3	5	1	—	—
1981	1981	Michael Vendetti	NCAA	Division III	NEFC	5	4	0	T–4th	5	4	0	—	—
1982	1982	Michael Vendetti	NCAA	Division III	NEFC	5	4	0	5th	5	4	0	—	—
1983	1983	Michael Vendetti	NCAA	Division III	NEFC	7	2	0	3rd	7	2	0	—	—
1984	1984	Michael Vendetti	NCAA	Division III	NEFC	2	7	0	T–7th	2	7	0	—	—
1985	1985	Michael Vendetti	NCAA	Division III	NEFC	1	7	0	10th	1	7	0	—	—
1986	1986	Jack Charney	NCAA	Division III	NEFC	3	6	0	7th	3	6	0	—	—
1987	1987	Jack Charney	NCAA	Division III	NEFC	5	4	0	3rd (North)	3	2	0	—	—
1988	1988	Jack Charney	NCAA	Division III	NEFC	6	3	0	3rd (North)	4	2	0	—	—
1989	1989	Jack Charney	NCAA	Division III	NEFC	4	5	0	4th (North)	2	3	0	—	—
1990	1990	Jack Charney	NCAA	Division III	NEFC	5	4	0	4th (North)	2	3	0	—	—
1991	1991	Jack Charney	NCAA	Division III	NEFC	4	5	0	T–3rd (North)	2	3	0	—	—
1992	1992	Jack Charney	NCAA	Division III	ECFC	7	1	1	T–2nd	4	1	1	—	—
1993	1993	Jim Crowley	NCAA	Division III	ECFC	1	8	0	7th	0	6	0	—	—
1994	1994	Jim Crowley	NCAA	Division II	ECFC	2	7	0	5th	2	4	0	—	—
1995	1995	Jim Crowley	NCAA	Division II	ECFC	0	9	0	9th	0	7	0	—	—
1996	1996	Jim Foster	NCAA	Division II	ECFC	2	8	0	8th	2	5	0	—	—
1997	1997	Jim Foster	NCAA	Division III	ECFC	2	7	0	4th	1	3	0	—	—
1998	1998	Jim Foster	NCAA	Division III	NEFC	5	5	0	5th (Blue)	2	4	0	—	—
1999	1999	Bill Carven	NCAA	Division III	NEFC	6	3	0	4th (Blue)	3	3	0	—	—
2000	2000	Bill Carven	NCAA	Division III	NEFC	7	3	0	T–2nd (Boyd)	4	2	0	—	—
2001	2001	Bill Carven	NCAA	Division III	NEFC	6	4	0	1st (Boyd)	5	0	0	Division champions	—
2002	2002	Bill Carven	NCAA	Division III	NEFC	5	4	0	T–2nd (Boyd)	3	2	0	—	—
2003	2003	Bill Carven	NCAA	Division III	NEFC	6	4	0	T–2nd (Boyd)	4	2	0	—	—
2004	2004	Bill Carven	NCAA	Division III	NEFC	4	6	0	T–4th (Boyd)	3	3	0	—	—
2005	2005	Bill Carven	NCAA	Division III	NEFC	0	9	0	7th (Boyd)	0	6	0	—	—
2006	2006	Bill Carven	NCAA	Division III	NEFC	5	4	0	T–3rd (Boyd)	4	3	0	—	—
2007	2007	Bill Carven	NCAA	Division III	NEFC	5	4	0	T–3rd (Boyd)	4	3	0	—	—
2008	2008	Bill Carven	NCAA	Division III	NEFC	2	8	0	8th (Boyd)	0	7	0	—	—
2009	2009	Bill Carven	NCAA	Division III	NEFC	4	6	0	T–4th (Boyd)	3	4	0	—	—
2010	2010	Bill Carven	NCAA	Division III	NEFC	1	9	0	7th (Boyd)	1	6	0	—	—
2011	2011	Kevin Loney	NCAA	Division III	NEFC	0	10	0	8th (Boyd)	0	7	0	—	—
2012	2012	Kevin Loney	NCAA	Division III	NEFC	1	9	0	T–6th (Boyd)	1	6	0	—	—
2013	2013	Kevin Loney	NCAA	Division III	NEFC	1	8	0	8th	0	7	0	—	—
2014	2014	Dale Olmsted	NCAA	Division III	NEFC	1	9	0	8th	0	7	0	—	—
2015	2015	Dale Olmsted	NCAA	Division III	NEFC	1	9	0	8th	0	7	0	—	—
2016	2016	Dale Olmsted	NCAA	Division III	NEFC	6	4	0	4th	4	3	0	—	—
2017	2017	Dale Olmsted	NCAA	Division III	CCC Football	2	8	0	6th	0	5	0	—	—
2018	2018	Dale Olmsted	NCAA	Division III	CCC Football	5	5	0	4th	3	3	0	—	—
2019	2019	Dale Olmsted	NCAA	Division III	CCC Football	6	4	0	T–3rd	4	3	0	—	—
No team in 2020 due to COVID-19.
2021	2021	Dale Olmsted	NCAA	Division III	CCC Football	2	8	0	7th	0	6	0	—	—
2022	2022	Dale Olmsted	NCAA	Division III	CCC Football	4	6	0	T–6th	1	5	0	—	—
2023	2023	Dale Olmsted	NCAA	Division III	CCC Football	3	7	0	T–5th	0	5	0	—	—
2024	2024	Vinny Marino	NCAA	Division III	CCC Football	3	7	0	6th	0	5	0	—	—
2025	2025	Vinny Marino	NCAA	Division III	CCC Football	2	8	0	6th	2	5	0	—	—
