= Fitchburg High School =

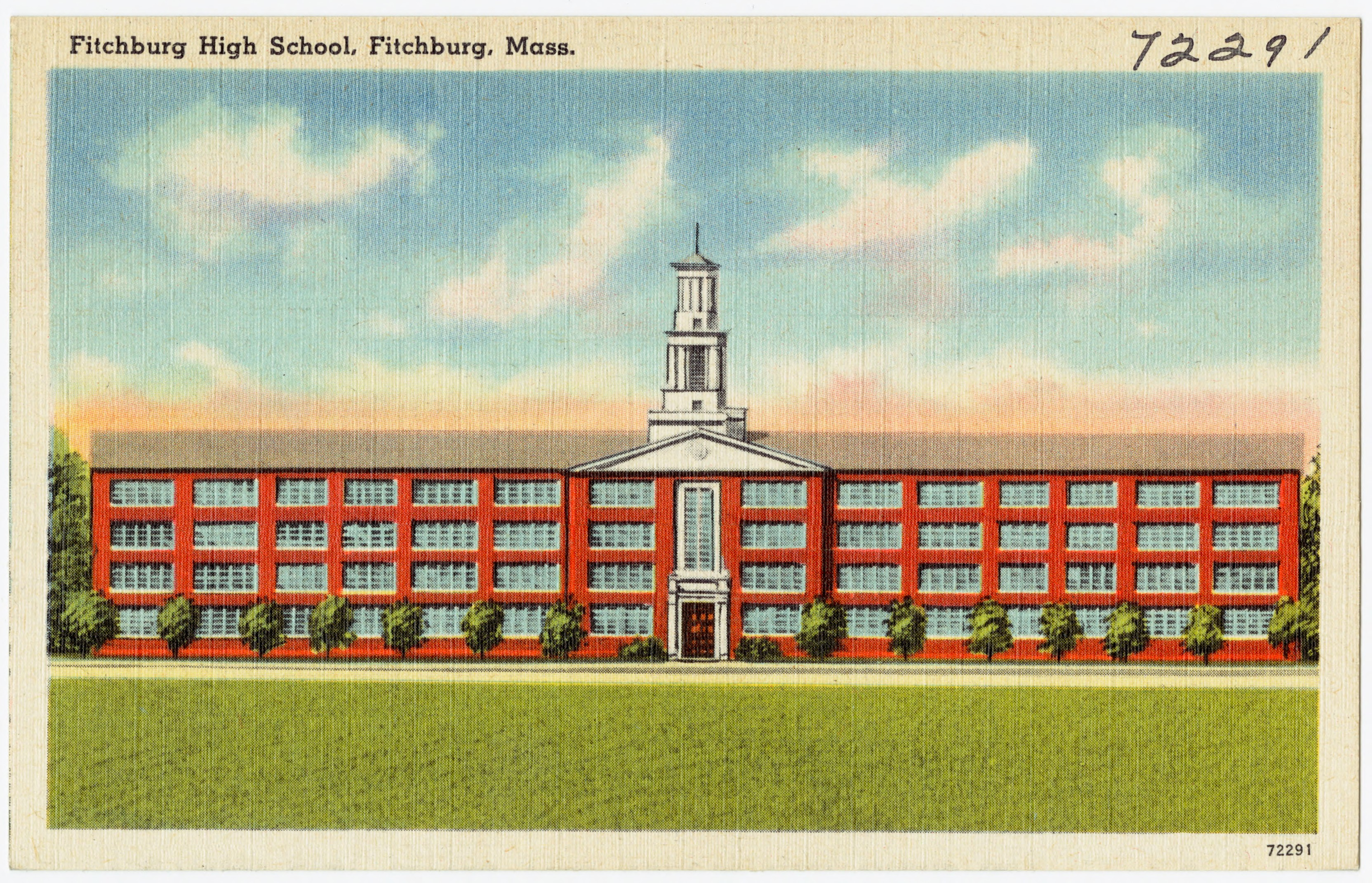
- Postcard of Fitchburg High School c. 1935.

Location
- 140 Arnhow Farm Road; Fitchburg, Massachusetts 01420; United States; 42.6214°N 71.8076°W

Information
- Type: Public high school
- Motto: Prepared to Succeed.
- Established: 1849
- Founder: Anson S. Marshall
- School district: Fitchburg Public Schools
- Principal: Matthew Lamey, Interim
- Faculty: 126
- Grades: 9 - 12
- Enrollment: 1,180 (2023-2024)
- Campus type: Suburban
- Colors: Red and Gray
- Athletics conference: Midland Wachusett League
- Nickname: Red Raiders
- Yearbook: Boulder
- Website: fhs.fitchburg.k12.ma.us

Fitchburg High School is a public high school in Fitchburg, Massachusetts. The school is part of the Fitchburg Public Schools district. Initially established in 1849, the current building, located on 140 Arnhow Farm Road, opened in 2000.

== History ==
Fitchburg High School has existed in some capacity since 1830, when its first schoolhouse was constructed. However, the school was officially established in 1849 under the leadership of its first principal, Anson S. Marshall. Fitchburg High is recorded as the seventy-third oldest active public high school in the United States. Due to ever growing enrollment, a new structure was built in 1869 and was designed by a local architect named Elbridge Boyden.

Notably, in the 1874–1875 school year, Henry P. Armsby taught at Fitchburg High.

In 1937, the longest-lasting Fitchburg High School building was erected at 98 Academy Street. This new building was designed by the firm of Coolidge, Shepley, Bulfinch and Abbott to replace the previous high school which had burned down in 1934. Charles Wilson Killam, a professor at Harvard University, was hired as consulting architect for this project. The school operated there until the 1999–2000 academic year. That building was converted into use for Longsjo Middle School in 2009. Fitchburg High then moved the northern part of town, near its border with Ashby.

In 1962, the Fitchburg High Marching Band participated as one of a select few high school bands in the Rose Parade, an annual parade following the Rose Bowl Game. It is the only time the school has participated.

== Athletics ==
Known as the Red Raiders, athletic teams of Fitchburg High School don the colors of red and gray. The school primarily uses Crocker Field for football and track and field, while the Wallace Civic Center is used for ice hockey games. The Doug Grutchfield Field House, named after a former athletic director of the school, hosts basketball, volleyball, and indoor track and field events.

Fitchburg High has one of the longest-standing high school football rivalries in the United States with nearby Leominster High School, known as "The Rivalry." The first game between the two teams was played on October 20, 1894, and has since played annually on Thanksgiving. The match is also referred to by locals as the "Turkey Bowl." As of 2021, the series record is 69–61–10, in favor of Leominster.

Notable coaches of the Fitchburg High football team history include Walt Dubzinski, Dennis Gildea, and Cleo A. O'Donnell.

== Demographics ==
According to U.S. News & World Report in 2021, the Fitchburg High School student body is nearly half Hispanic and nearly a third White, with smaller percentages of African American and Asian students.

== Notable alumni ==
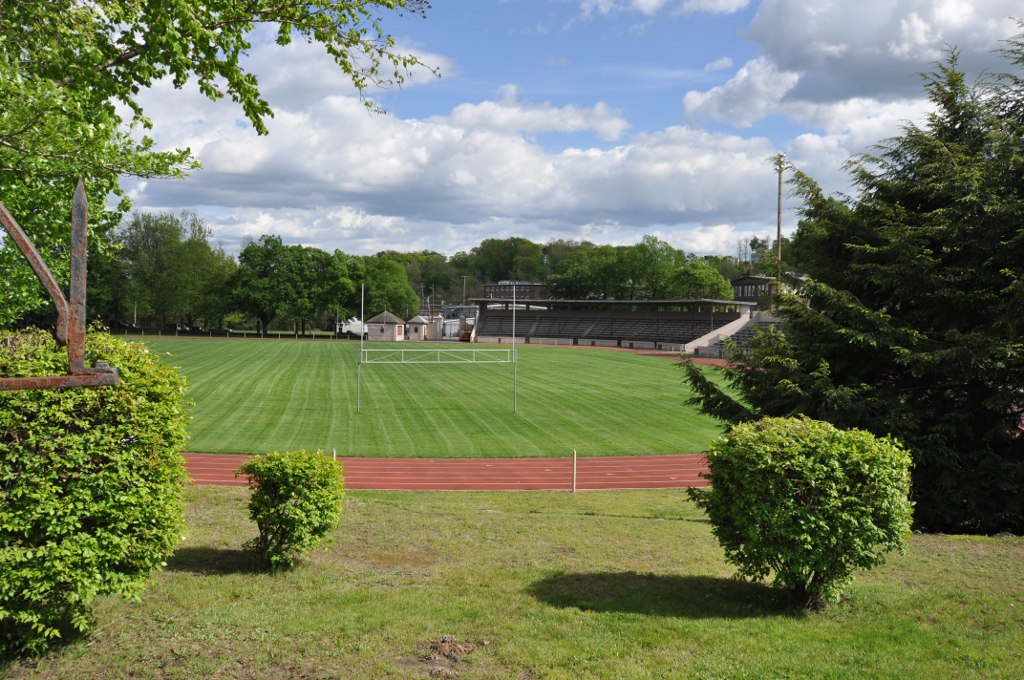
View of Crocker Field in 2012

- Aldrich Bowker, actor
- James L. Conrad (1918), former president of Nichols College
- Frank Wesley Fenno Jr., United States Navy officer
- Mary Graustein, professor of mathematics at Radcliffe College
- Christian Hansen Jr. (1949), U.S. Marshal for Vermont
- George Juskalian (1932), United States Army officer
- Robert Niemi (1973), author
- Eleanor Norcross (1870), painter
- Benjamin A. Poore (1879), U.S. Army major general
- Francis H. Snow, chancellor of the University of Kansas
- Nathan A. Tufts, politician

== See also ==
- List of high school football rivalries more than 100 years old
- List of high schools in Massachusetts
- List of the oldest public high schools in the United States
