= Hal Chalmers =

American football coach

Biographical details
- Education: Nichols Junior College of Business Administration and Executive Training (1936)

Coaching career (HC unless noted)
- 1947–1958: Nichols

Head coaching record
- Overall: 25–38–5

Accomplishments and honors

Awards
- Nichols Hall of Fame

Hal Chalmers was an American football coach. He was the head football coach at Nichols Junior College of Business Administration and Executive Training—now known as Nichols College—in Dudley, Massachusetts from 1947 to 1958.

The Hall Chalmers Award which is given annually to the best students Senior Scholar Athlete in the Commonwealth Coast Conference is named in his honor.

== Head coaching record ==
Year	Team	Overall	Conference	Standing	Bowl/playoffs
Nichols Bison (Independent) (1947–1958)
1947	Nichols	2–2–3			
1948	Nichols	5–1			
1949	Nichols	6–0			
1950	Nichols	1–5			
1951	Nichols	5–0–1			
1952	Nichols	1–6			
1953	Nichols	1–4–1			
1954	Nichols	1–4			
1955	Nichols	0–4			
1956	Nichols	1–5			
1957	Nichols	0–3			
1958	Nichols	2–4			
Nichols:		25–38–5			
Total:		25–38–5			
