= Harry Gaffney =

American football coach

Coaching career (HC unless noted)
- 1959–1961: Nichols

Head coaching record
- Overall: 7–10

Harry Gafney was an American football coach. He was the head football coach at the Nichols College in Dudley, Massachusetts from 1959 to 1961.

== Head coaching record ==
Year	Team	Overall	Conference	Standing	Bowl/playoffs
Nichols Bison (Independent) (1959–1961)
1959	Nichols	3–3			
1960	Nichols	2–4			
1961	Nichols	2–3			
Nichols:		7–10			
Total:		7–10			
