= Venditti =

Venditti is an Italian surname. Notable people with the surname include:

- Antonello Venditti (born 1949), Italian singer-songwriter and pianist
- David Venditti (born 1973), French rugby union player
- Francesco Venditti (born 1976), Italian actor and voice actor
- Gabriele Venditti (born 1997), Italian rugby union player
- Giovanbattista Venditti (born 1990), Italian rugby union player
- Jennifer Venditti, American casting director, filmmaker, and author
- Jeremy Venditti (born 1971), Canadian geomorphologist
- Robert Venditti (born 1967), American comic book writer

== See also ==
- 45752 Venditti, minor planet
- Vendetti, surname
