= Hezekiah Healy =

American landowner, mechanic, and builder of the Black Tavern in Massachusetts

- Born: October 8, 1766; Dudley, Massachusetts, United States
- Died: December 28, 1817; Dudley, Massachusetts, United States
- Resting place: Corbin Cemetery
- Occupations: Landowner, mechanic, cabinetmaker, militia captain
- Known for: Builder of the Black Tavern; contributions to early American textile machinery
- Spouse: Rebecca Corbin

Hezekiah Healy (October 8, 1766 - December 28, 1817) was a landowner, mechanic, cabinetmaker and militia captain in Dudley, Massachusetts.

Hezekiah built the Black Tavern, a historic tavern on Dudley Center Road around 1803.

== Biography ==
Hezekiah was born in Dudley, Massachusetts to Joseph Healy, a Patriot of the Revolutionary War who is on the monument in front of the church on Dudley Hill, and Mary Whitmore. In 1798 Hezekiah married Rebecca Corbin, the daughter of Major Lemuel Corbin Sr, a local Minuteman.

Hezekiah made and set up the first loom for weaving by power used in the Webster mill of Samuel Slater.

In 1803, Hezekiah began building what would become the Black Tavern, originally called Healy's Inn. The tavern and its surrounding areas were a popular spot for both locals and travelers, since it was in the Old Dudley Center, about halfway between Boston and Hartford and right next to Nichols College.

Hezekiah died on December 28, 1817.
