= College Hall =

College Hall may refer to:

== United Kingdom ==
- College Hall, London, England, a hall of residence of the University of London
- College Hall, Royal Air Force College Cranwell, England
- College Hall (Westminster School), London, England, a 14th-century dining hall

== United States ==
- College Hall (Fayette, Iowa), now Alexander-Dickman Hall
- College Hall (Michigan State University)
- College Hall, University of Southern Mississippi
- College Hall (Rutgers University), New Jersey, originally Levi D. Jarrard House
- College Hall (Tiffin, Ohio), listed on the National Register of Historic Places in Seneca County, Ohio
- College Hall, Wilmington College (Ohio)
- College Hall (La Salle University), Philadelphia, Pennsylvania
- College Hall (University of Pennsylvania)
- College Hall (Montpelier, Vermont)
