= WNRC-LP =

- Dudley, Massachusetts; United States
- Broadcast area: Worcester County, Massachusetts
- Frequency: 97.5 MHz
- Branding: 97.5 WNRC

Programming
- Format: College

Ownership
- Owner: Nichols College

History
- First air date: February 2005
- Call sign meaning: Nichols Radio Club

Technical information
- Licensing authority: FCC
- Facility ID: 133676
- Class: L1
- ERP: 31 watts
- HAAT: 52.7 meters (173 ft)
- Transmitter coordinates: 42°02′40″N 71°55′52″W

Links
- Public license information: LMS
- Webcast: Listen live
- Website: wnrc.nichols.edu

WNRC-LP (97.5 FM) is a radio station licensed to serve Dudley, Massachusetts. The station is owned by Nichols College. It airs a college radio format, 24/7 in stereo.

The station was assigned the WNRC-LP call letters by the Federal Communications Commission on September 1, 2005. This low-power station replaces a 15-watt class-D "full power" FM station known as WNRC that had been licensed to Nichols College; that station is now WXRB.
