= Jim Crowley (American football coach, born 1930) =

American football coach

Biographical details
- Born: c. 1930; Lowell, Massachusetts, U.S.
- Died: March 21, 2013; Providence, Rhode Island, U.S.
- Education: Villanova University (1951)

Coaching career (HC unless noted)
- 1987: Bridgewater State
- 1993–1995: Nichols

Head coaching record
- Overall: 7–29

James P. Crowley Sr. (c. 1930 – March 21, 2013) was an American football coach. He was the head football coach at the Nichols College in Dudley, Massachusetts from 1993 to 1995.

Prior to that, Crowley served as the head coach for one season, in 1987, at Bridgewater State College in Bridgewater, Massachusetts.

== Head coaching record ==
| Year | Team | Overall | Conference | Standing | Bowl/playoffs |
|---|---|---|---|---|---|
Bridgewater State Bears (New England Football Conference) (1987)
| 1987 | Bridgewater State | 4–5 | 3–2 | T–2nd (South) | |
| Bridgewater State: | | 4–5 | 3–2 | | |
Nichols Bison (Eastern Collegiate Football Conference) (1993–1995)
| 1993 | Nichols | 1–8 | 0–6 | 7th | |
| 1994 | Nichols | 2–7 | 2–4 | 5th | |
| 1995 | Nichols | 0–9 | 0–7 | 9th | |
| Nichols: | | 3–24 | 2–17 | | |
| Total: | | 7–29 | | | |
