= Dale Olmsted =

American football coach (born c. 1968–1969)

Biographical details
- Born: c. 1968 or 1969 (age 56–57); Walpole, Massachusetts, U.S.

Playing career
- 1987–1988: Salem
- 1989–1991: West Liberty State
- Position: Defensive back

Coaching career (HC unless noted)
- 1992–1993: Walpole HS (MA) (assistant)
- 1994–1998: Walpole HS (MA) (OC)
- 1999: Walpole HS (MA) (DC)
- 2000–2002: Dedham HS (MA) (AHC/OC)
- 2003: Braintree HS (MA) (OC/DC)
- 2004: King Philip HS (MA) (OC/DC)
- 2005–2009: Millis HS (MA)
- 2010–2013: Millis–Hopedale HS (MA)
- 2014–2023: Nichols
- 2024–2025: Tufts (TE)

Head coaching record
- Overall: 30–60 (college); 45–51 (high school)

Dale Olmsted (born c. 1968 or 1969) is an American college football coach. He most recently served as the tight ends coach for Tufts University, a position he held from 2024 to 2025. He was the head football coach for Nichols College from 2014 to 2023. He was the head football coach for Millis High School from 2005 and 2009 and the school's co-op team with Hopedale Junior Senior High School from 2010 to 2013. He also coached for Walpole High School, Dedham High School, Braintree High School, and King Philip Regional High School. He played college football for Salem and West Liberty State as a defensive back.

== Head coaching record ==
=== College ===
Year	Team	Overall	Conference	Standing	Bowl/playoffs
Nichols Bison (New England Football Conference) (2014–2016)
2014	Nichols	1–9	0–7	8th	
2015	Nichols	1–9	0–7	8th	
2016	Nichols	6–4	4–3	4th	
Nichols Bison (Commonwealth Coast Football) (2017–2021)
2017	Nichols	2–8	0–5	5th	
2018	Nichols	5–5	3–3	4th	
2019	Nichols	6–4	4–3	T–3rd	
2020–21	No team—COVID-19				
2021	Nichols	2–8	0–6	7th	
Nichols Bison (Commonwealth Coast Conference) (2022–2023)
2022	Nichols	4–6	1–5	T–6th	
2023	Nichols	3–7	0–5	T–5th	
Nichols:		30–60	12–44		
Total:		30–60			

=== High school ===
Year	Team	Overall	Conference	Standing	Bowl/playoffs
Millis Mohawks () (2005–2009)
2005	Millis	2–8	1–8	T–9th	
2006	Millis	3–8	1–8	9th	
2007	Millis	0–11	0–9	10th	
2008	Millis	5–6	3–6	8th	
2009	Millis	5–6	4–5	6th	
Millis:		15–39	9–35		
Millis–Hopedale Mohawks () (2010–2013)
2010	Millis–Hopedale	3–7	3–5	7th	
2011	Millis–Hopedale	10–2	4–1	1st	
2012	Millis–Hopedale	8–4	4–0	1st	
2013	Millis–Hopedale	9–3	3–1	2nd	
Millis–Hopedale:		30–16	14–7		
Total:		45–51			
National championship Conference title Conference division title or championship game berth
