= Dudley Hill Historic District =

Historic district in Massachusetts, United States

- U.S. National Register of Historic Places
- U.S. Historic district
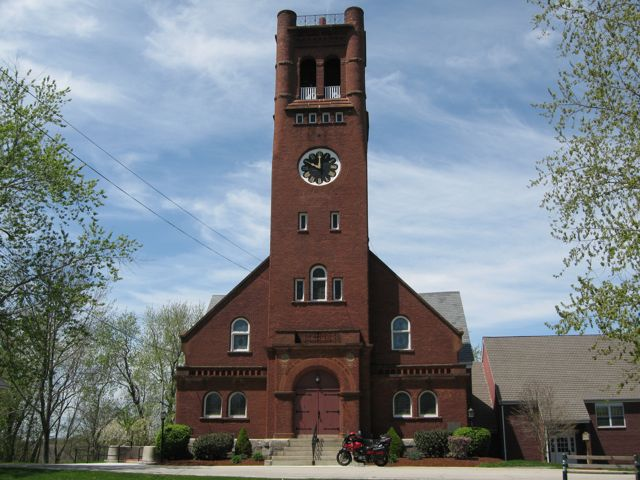
- Conant Memorial Church

- Location within Massachusetts Location within the United States
- Location: Center, Dudley Oxford Rd., Dudley Southbridge, Ramshorn & Tanyard Rds. Dudley, Massachusetts
- Coordinates: 42°2′49″N 71°55′45″W
- NRHP reference No.: 100004707
- Added to NRHP: December 2, 2019

The Dudley Hill Historic District encompasses the historic heart of Dudley, Massachusetts. The historic district is essentially linear, extending along Center Street between Dudley Hill and Tanyard Roads. This area was the first to be settled in the mid-17th century, and is composed mainly of civic, religious, and residential buildings dating to the 18th and 19th centuries. The district listed on the National Register of Historic Places in 2001.

== Description and history ==
The town of Dudley was carved out of land purchased by Joseph Dudley and William Stoughton in 1681 from the Nipmuc Indians. It was not settled until land sales in the 1720s, and was incorporated in 1732. The Dudley Hill area, where the town center is located, had a longer history as a Nipmuc settlement, and some of its land was granted for the erection of the first church in 1734. After American independence, the town center grew, with the Black Tavern (c. 1803) serving travelers, and Nichols Academy (founded 1815) located there.

Dudley Hill is a linear ridge, oriented roughly north-south, along which Center Street runs. The historic district extends roughly from Dudley Hill Road in the north to Tanyard Road in the south. The northern end of the district is marked by the village cemetery, and the southern end by the Nichols campus. The most architecturally substantial building in the district is the Conant Memorial Church, built out of brick in 1890. Next to the church stands the Italianate Grange hall, built c. 1840 as a school, and the Black Tavern is across the street. Most of the residential architecture is either Federal or Greek Revival in style, although there are two examples of later 19th-century Stick style houses.

== See also ==
- National Register of Historic Places listings in Worcester County, Massachusetts
