= Darcy C. Coyle =

American academic (1918–2002)

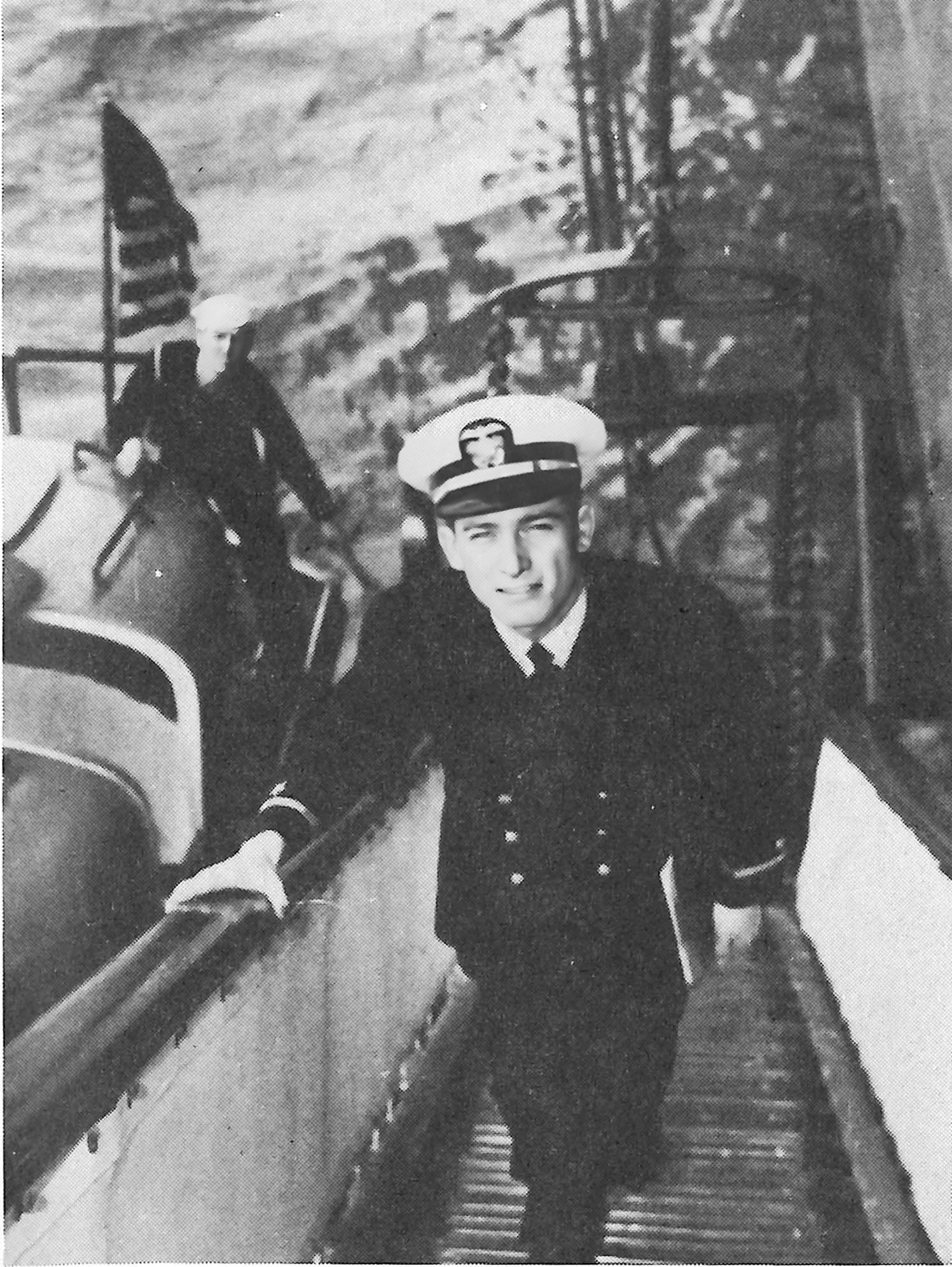
- Born: Darcy Crenshaw Coyle; October 26, 1918; Trigg County, Kentucky, United States
- Died: September 8, 2002 (aged 83); Grand Rapids, Michigan, United States
- Education: Harvard University
- Occupation: Academic administrator
- Spouse(s): Vera Constance Purtell (m. 1941-1969); Barbara Jane Moore Crossley (m. 1969-2002)
- Children: Rebecca Kay

Darcy Crenshaw Coyle (October 26, 1918 - September 8, 2002) was an American professor and academic administrator, who served as the president of Nichols College from 1973 to 1978 and Upper Iowa University from 1978 to 1984.

== Career ==
Born to Delphus C. and Stella Vivian, Coyle graduated from Battle Creek Central High School in 1936, and soon went on to attend the United States Navy Academy and joined the United States Naval. He participated in World War II, and spent time aboard the aircraft carriers USS Ranger (CV-4) and USS Randolph (CV-15). Coyle would resign from the level of Lieutenant Commander in 1946.

Coyle continued his education by receiving a Master of Business Administration from Harvard University in 1948, and then a Doctor of Business Administration in 1962. His dissertation was titled "Mechanization: Work Measurement and Manpower Utilization."

Before beginning a career in education, Coyle worked as an industrial engineer for such companies as Gillette, Spalding, and Sylvania Electric Products.

Coyle entered the field of education as a professor at Babson College from 1949 to 1951. He then taught at his alma mater, the Harvard Business School, from 1957 to 1959, as well as Boston University from 1959 to 1961, and at Rensselaer Polytechnic Institute from 1961 to 1973.

In 1973, Coyle was named President of Nichols College, and became the third to hold that position in the school's history, succeeding James L. Conrad and Gordon B. Cross. That same year, Coyle gave the commencement address for the graduating class. During his administration, in 1974, Nichols received the authority from the Commonwealth of Massachusetts to grant the degree of Master of Business Administration. He would remain in the post until 1978, when he accepted to become President of Upper Iowa University. In 1984, Coyle retired as President Emeritus.

Over his career, Coyle also accepted several visiting faculty appointments in the United Kingdom, including the University of Westminster (1965), the University of Hertfordshire (1966–1968), Oxford University (1967–1971), the International Institute for Management Development (1967–1968), and Heriot-Watt University (1969).

In 1985, Coyle was sent to Indonesia by the International Executive Service Corps to conduct a study on setting up a business college in the country. That same year, he moved to New Hampshire and became an adjunct professor at New England College and Keene State College. In 1993, Coyle moved to Grand Rapids, where he would die in 2002, after suffering a stroke.

== Works ==
- Proceedings of the Conference on Management of Research and Development, 1963
- Nichols College: A Brief History, 1975
- Censored Mail: A Personal Narrative of World War II Aboard the Aircraft Carriers, U.S.S. Ranger (CV-4) and U.S.S. Randolph (CV-15), 1989, ISBN 978-0833802002
