= Vinny Marino =

American football coach (born 1969)

Current position
- Title: Head coach
- Team: Nichols
- Conference: CNE
- Record: 5–15

Biographical details
- Born: March 5, 1969 (age 57); Southbridge, Massachusetts, U.S.
- Education: University of Connecticut (1992); Western Carolina University (1996)

Playing career
- 1988–1991: Connecticut
- Position: Quarterback

Coaching career (HC unless noted)
- 1992: Bowdoin (WR)
- 1993: Western Carolina (GA)
- 1994–1995: Western Carolina (QB)
- 1996–1997: Holy Cross (RB)
- 1998: Holy Cross (OC/QB)
- 1999: Richmond (QB/WR)
- 2000–2001: Rhode Island (RB)
- 2002–2005: Connecticut (WR)
- 2006–2011: Columbia (OC/QB)
- 2012–2013: Georgetown (OC/QB)
- 2014–2015: Boston College (OQC)
- 2016: Davidson (OC/QB)
- 2017–2018: Bryant (OC)
- 2019–2021: Brown (OC/QB)
- 2022–2023: Nichols (OC/QB)
- 2024–present: Nichols

Head coaching record
- Overall: 5–15

John Vincent Marino (born March 5, 1969) is an American college football coach. He is the head football coach for Nichols College, a position he has held since 2024. He also coached for Bowdoin, Western Carolina, Holy Cross, Richmond, Rhode Island, Connecticut, Columbia, Georgetown, Boston College, Davidson, Bryant, and Brown. He played college football for Connecticut as a quarterback.

== Head coaching record ==
Year	Team	Overall	Conference	Standing	Bowl/playoffs
Nichols Bison (Conference of New England) (2024–present)
2024	Nichols	3–7	0–5	6th	
2025	Nichols	2–8	2–5	6th	
2026	Nichols	0–0	0–0		
Nichols:		5–15	2–10		
Total:		5–15			
