= Vendetti =

Vendetti is an Italian surname. Notable people with the surname include:

- Gino Vendetti, Canadian para-athlete
- Michael Vendetti (c. 1932–2014), American football, tennis and track and field coach

== See also ==
- Venditti, surname
