= Black Tavern =

- U.S. National Register of Historic Places
- U.S. Historic district – Contributing property
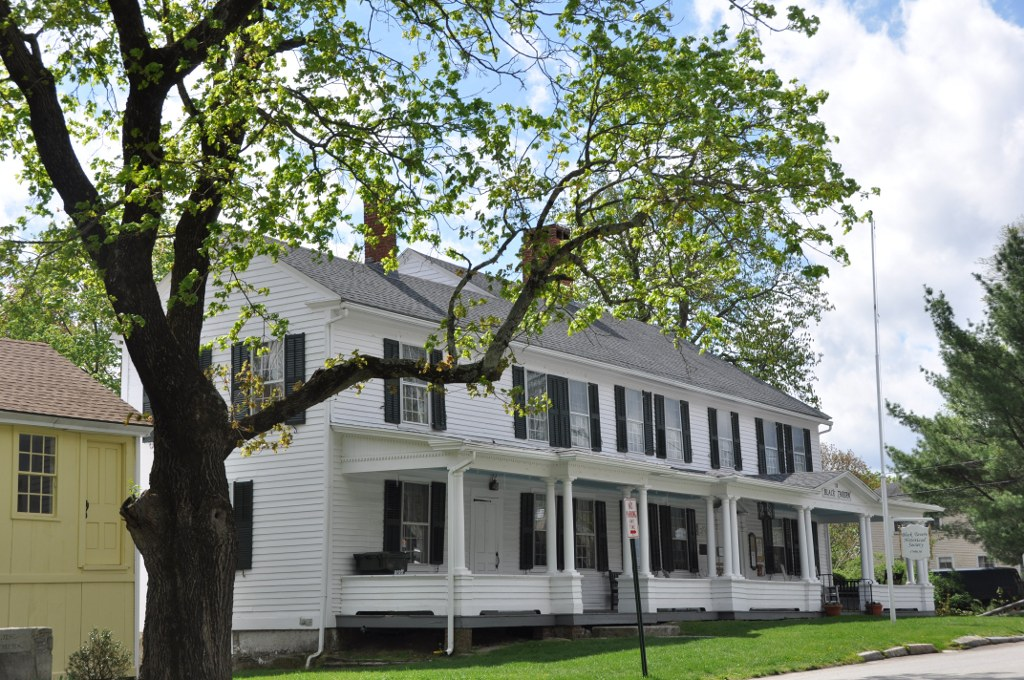

- Location within Massachusetts Location within the United States
- Location: 138-142 Dudley Center Rd., Dudley, Massachusetts
- Coordinates: 42°2′44″N 71°55′48″W
- Built: c. 1803
- Architect: Healy, Hezekiah
- Architectural style: Federal
- Part of: Dudley Hill Historic District (ID100004707)
- NRHP reference No.: 85000981 (original); 10000928 (increase)

Significant dates
- Added to NRHP: May 9, 1985
- Boundary increase: November 17, 2010
- Designated CP: December 2, 2019

The Black Tavern is a historic tavern at 138-142 Dudley Center Road in Dudley, Massachusetts. The main block of the tavern was built c. 1803, and is one of the town's finest examples of Federal period architecture. It originally housed a major stop on the stagecoach route between Boston, Massachusetts and Hartford, Connecticut. It is now maintained by a local preservation organization, and was listed on the National Register of Historic Places in 1985. In 2010 the listing was expanded to include the adjacent barn and annex, which the society acquired in 2000.

== Description and history ==
The Black Tavern is located in the town center of Dudley, at the northeast corner of Dudley Center and Tanyard Roads, just north of the Nichols College campus. It is a 2 1/2-story wood-frame structure, with a gabled roof and clapboarded exterior. Its main block is five bays wide, with a center entrance framed by symmetrically placed sash windows. A two-story ell extends to the left side, with a four-bay facade. A single-story porch extends across the full width of both of these sections. The main entrance has a finely detailed Federal period surround, including fluted pilasters and a half-round transom window.

Dudley was about halfway between Boston and Hartford, Connecticut, and was a major stopping point on the stagecoach route. The tavern was built about 1803–04 by Hezekiah Healy, and served both the transient stage traveler as well as local residents. The building was given its name after Healy supposedly decided to paint it black, reasoning that that color required less maintenance. The building was extended by an ell to the rear in 1810 and another to the left side in 1835. The porch running across its front that was added c. 1890. In the 20th century the building was used by nearby Nichols College as a dormitory until 1980, after which it was given to the Black Tavern Society, a local nonprofit established to preserve the structure.

== See also ==
- National Register of Historic Places listings in Worcester County, Massachusetts
