= Mauri S. Pelto =

American glaciologist

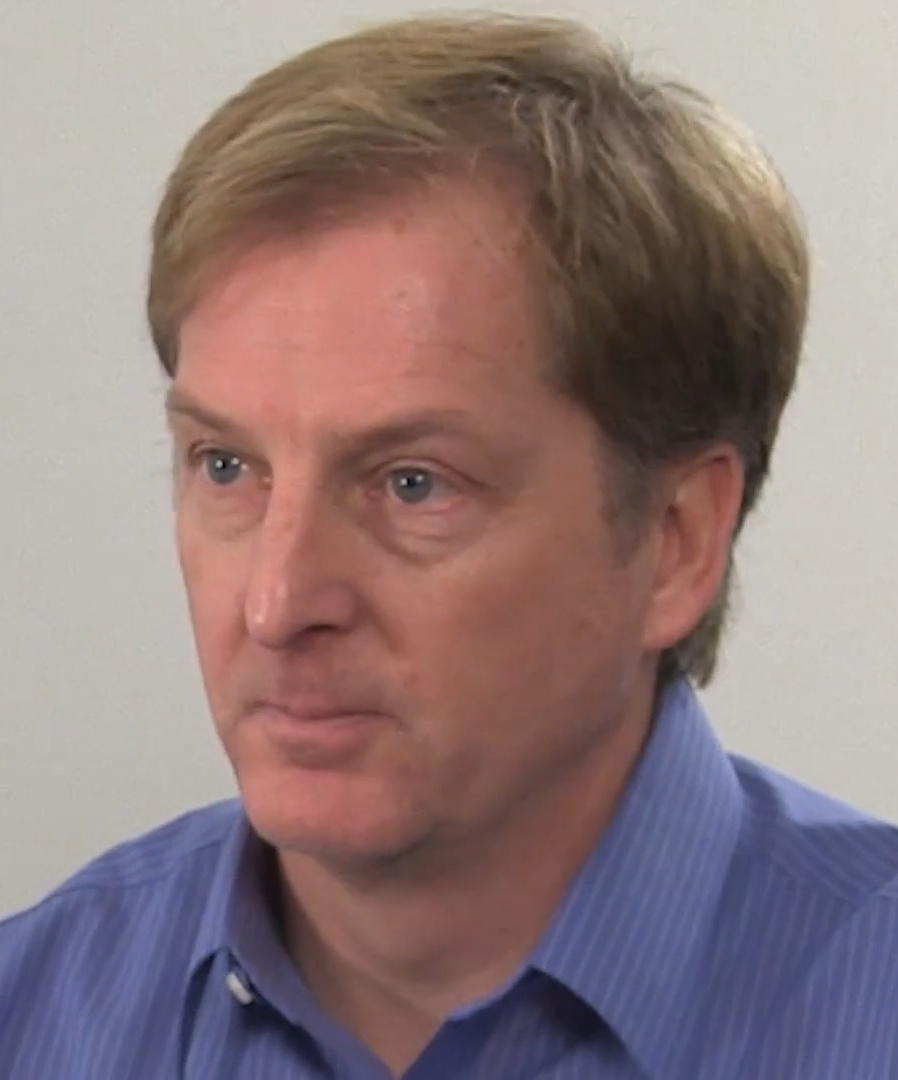
Mauri Pelto in 2015

Mauri S. Pelto is a professor of environmental science at Nichols College in Dudley, Massachusetts and director of the North Cascades Glacier Climate Project.

== Work ==
Mauri Pelto has been studying the glaciers in the North Cascades located in the U.S. state of Washington since 1984. Pelto's research team has recorded the mass balance of numerous glaciers, all of which are retreating due to global warming, which has raised temperatures and decreased the amount of snowfall in the accumulation zone of the North Cascade glaciers. More recently, Pelto has used Landsat imagery from the past and compared it to more recent imagery to make comparisons between the extent of glacial coverage over periods spanning decades.

Pelto has stated that of the 756 glaciers that were identified in the North Cascades by the U.S. Geological Survey in 1971, 53 of them had disappeared completely by 2006. Another nine are also expected to disappear if current climate patterns continue. In addition, three glaciers in particular pose economic and environmental risks if they retreat much further.
