= Michael Vendetti =

American football, tennis and track and field coach

Biographical details
- Born: c.1932 Leominster, Massachusetts, U.S.
- Died: March 20, 2014; Charlton, Massachusetts, U.S.
- Education: Boston University

Coaching career (HC unless noted)

Football
- 1959–1962: Vermont (assistant)
- 1962–1985: Nichols

Tennis
- 1983–1984: Nichols

Track
- 1963–1986: Nichols
- 1987–1989: WPI

Head coaching record
- Overall: 103–83–5 (football)

Accomplishments and honors

Championships
- Football; 5 NEFC (1973–1976, 1978)

Awards
- Football; 5× NEFC Coach of Year (1973–1976, 1978)

Michael J. Vendetti (c.1932 – March 20, 2014) was an American football, tennis and track and field coach. He was the head football coach at the Nichols College in Dudley, Massachusetts from 1962 to 1985.

Vendetti also served as a tennis coach and a track and field coach while at Nichols, as well as serving as a track coach at Worcester Polytechnic Institute in Worcester, Massachusetts from 1987 to 1989.

== Head coaching record ==
=== Football ===
Year	Team	Overall	Conference	Standing	Bowl/playoffs
Nichols Bison (NCAA College Division independent) (1962–1971)
1962	Nichols	3–3			
1963	Nichols	0–6			
1964	Nichols	4–2–1			
1965	Nichols	6–1			
1966	Nichols	3–3			
1967	Nichols	2–5			
1968	Nichols	4–4			
1969	Nichols	0–7			
1970	Nichols	3–4			
1971	Nichols	4–3–1			
Nichols Bison (New England Football Conference) (1972–1985)
1972	Nichols	5–2–1	3–2	4th	
1973	Nichols	8–1	4–0	1st	
1974	Nichols	7–1–1	6–0–1	1st	
1975	Nichols	6–2	6–2	T–1st	
1976	Nichols	8–1	7–1	1st	
1977	Nichols	5–4	4–4	T–5th	
1978	Nichols	6–2	6–2	T–1st	
1979	Nichols	6–3	6–3	T–2nd	
1980	Nichols	3–5–1	3–5–1	8th	
1981	Nichols	5–4	5–4	T–4th	
1982	Nichols	5–4	5–4	5th	
1983	Nichols	7–2	7–2	3rd	
1984	Nichols	2–7	2–7	T–7th	
1985	Nichols	1–7	1–7	10th	
Nichols:		103–83–5	65–43–2		
Total:		103–83–5			
National championship Conference title Conference division title or championship game berth
