= Dudley, Massachusetts cemetery proposal =

Opposition to creating a Muslim cemetery

- Date: February 5, 2016 – April 12, 2017
- Location: Dudley, Massachusetts, United States; 42.0712°N 71.9367°W

A proposal to create a Muslim cemetery by the Islamic Society of Greater Worcester on 55 acres (22 ha) of farmland in Dudley, Massachusetts elicited intense community opposition when discussed at a public hearing in February 2016. The Islamic Society sought to establish a closer burial place than Enfield, Connecticut. After a complicated process, with much back and forth between the Islamic Society and town officials, the necessary permit was issued over a year later.

== Proceedings ==
At the initial hearings, some residents made it clear that they did not want this cemetery in their town with concerns that included noise, traffic and well water contamination issues. The comments of some of the small town's residents raised concerns of religious bigotry. At the meeting, all the speakers in support of the Islamic Society were booed, and members of the public variously denounced the need to bury Muslim dead locally compared to the deaths of American soldiers fighting radical Islamic terrorist groups overseas, called the existing cemetery a "pigsty", and called the society's attempt to build a cemetery a "crusade". Though Muslim tradition is to bury without a coffin, in response to concerns about water quality the Islamic Society promised to use vaults.

The public hearing of the Zoning Board of Appeals reviewed the status of the land as an agricultural protected parcel protected under MGL Chapter 61A. At a town meeting held on May 23, 2016, action was postponed authorizing the board of selectmen to exercise the Town's first right of refusal in order to proceed to purchase the agricultural piece of land. When the Zoning Board of Appeals met on June 2, 2016, they asked the Islamic Society of Worcester if they were presenting a revised 5-acre cemetery plan (2.0 ha) which they had read about in the newspapers the week before. The Islamic Society of Worcester stated there was no revised plan and they expected the Zoning Board of Appeals to vote on their original proposal for 12,000+ grave sites. The Zoning Board of Appeals then scheduled a full vote for June 9, 2016, at which it denied the permit on the grounds the land was under Chapter 61A conservation protection and the town of Dudley thus had the right of first refusal to purchase the land. The board claimed that this meant the Islamic Society of Worcester lacked the proper legal standing to submit the cemetery plan until after the town's right of refusal had been extinguished. The society complained that it could not complete the purchase of the land and gain the standing the board required of it until the zoning approval had been granted, because its purchase agreement was contingent upon that action, putting the society in a Catch-22 situation.

The denial prompted a federal investigation by the U.S Attorney into potential religious discrimination, and a warning letter from the Massachusetts Attorney General. The Massachusetts chapter of the ACLU filed a lawsuit in state land court, claiming the denial violated freedom of religion provisions in the First Amendment to the United States Constitution, the Massachusetts Declaration of Rights, the Federal Religious Land Use and Institutionalized Persons Act, and the state Dover Amendment (which exempts certain religious organizations from zoning regulations). It also claimed the Chapter 61A protection was not applicable to conversion to cemetery use. The town Attorney argued that the Muslim cemetery, unlike Christian cemeteries, was not a religious land use due to differences between where Muslim and Christian burial rituals are held.

Both sides came to an agreement in December 2016 with the zoning board granting the permit for the cemetery on March 3, 2017. Burials will be restricted to 6 acres (2.4 ha) for the first 10-years. The permit requires a buffer zones of vegetation between the burials and the neighboring property in accordance with the agreement. After winning this approval (though not final Board of Health approval) and affirming its rights, the Islamic Society dropped its plans to build a cemetery in Dudley, and instead moved forward with plans to bury Muslim dead in a city-owned cemetery in Worcester, partly due to lower cost and partly because the city was more welcoming. The U.S. Attorney announced on April 12, 2017, that it was closing the investigation whether town officials had violated federal civil rights law that prohibits religious discrimination.
