= Anson S. Marshall =

American lawyer

Anson Southard Marshall
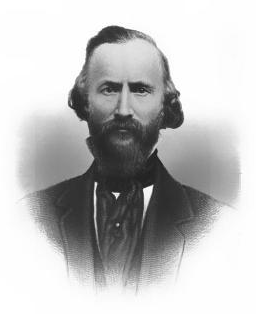

18th United States Attorney for the District of New Hampshire
- In office 1858–1861
- Appointed by: James Buchanan
- Preceded by: John H. George
- Succeeded by: Charles W. Rand

Personal details
- Born: December 3, 1822 Lyme, New Hampshire
- Died: July 4, 1874 Concord, New Hampshire
- Party: Democrat
- Spouse(s): Mary Jane Corning, m. April 9, 1861
- Children: Anson S. Marshall, Jr., born March 29, 1863
- Education: Thetfod Academy, Dartmouth College, 1848
- Occupation: Attorney
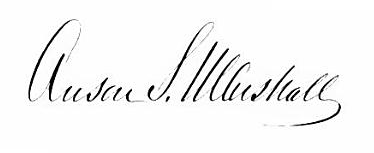
- Signature

Anson Southard Marshall (December 3, 1822 – July 4, 1874) was an American attorney and politician who served as the United States Attorney for the District of New Hampshire.

== Early life and education ==
Marshall was born on December 3, 1822, in Lyme, New Hampshire, to Macaiah and Martha (Southard) Marshall. Marshall attended Thetford Academy in Thetford, Vermont, and graduated from Dartmouth College in 1848.

== Educational career ==
Marshall taught school during his college vacations. From 1849 to 1851 Marshall was the principal of Fitchburg High School in Massachusetts.

== Legal career ==
Marshall studied law with the firm of Torrey & Wood in Fitchburg, Massachusetts, and in Concord, New Hampshire, with Franklin Pierce and Josiah Minot. Marshall was admitted to the New Hampshire Bar in 1852.

== Death ==
On the Fourth of July, 1874, Marshall, his wife and son were setting up a picnic lunch at Penacook Lake in West Concord when his wife heard the sound of bullets over their heads. Marshall saw no one firing, shouted to the shooters to be careful, then stood up and was shot in the abdomen. Marshall died at his home later that day. Marshall was shot with a minnie ball fired by the City Guards, a newly formed militia company that was engaged in target practice in a pasture bordering the lake.

Legal offices
Preceded by John H. George	18th United States Attorney for the District of New Hampshire; 1858-1861	Succeeded by Charles W. Rand
