= Battle Creek Public Schools =

School district in Michigan

Address
- 3 Van Buren West Battle Creek, Calhoun, Michigan, 49017; United States

District information
- Type: Public
- Grades: Pre-kindergarten through 12
- Superintendent: Dr. Kimberly Carter
- Schools: 13
- Budget: $89,903,000 (2022-2023 expeditures)
- NCES District ID: 2600005

Students and staff
- Students: 3,605 (2024-25)
- Teachers: 246.25 FTE (2024-25)
- Staff: 820.92 FTE (2024-25)
- Student–teacher ratio: 14.64 (2024-25)

Other information
- Website: www.battlecreekpublicschools.org

Battle Creek Public Schools is a public school district in Calhoun County, Michigan. It serves most of Battle Creek, all of Springfield, and parts of Brownlee Park, Level Park-Oak Park, and Bedford Township.

== History ==
Battle Creek Central High School opened in fall 1909, replacing a school that had been built in 1871. The architect was Wilbur Thoburn Mills. The building has received several additions, including a major renovation and expansion project completed in 2010. The architect for this project was TMP Associates.

In June 1933, the W.K. Kellogg Auditorium opened, along with a junior high school of the same name within the building. Built across McCamly Street from the Central High School, it was meant to be used for touring shows and concerts and the Battle Creek Symphony Orchestra. The building was a gift from cereal mogul Will Keith Kellogg. Musicians and bands that have played there include Johnny Cash, ZZ Top, Dizzy Gillespie, and Jerry Lee Lewis. The junior high school within the building has closed, and J.K. Kellogg Preparatory High School, an alternative high school, is housed in the building.

The district acquired the Sanitarium Union Building, a basketball arena with a bowling alley and swimming pool, in 1958 for $1. It had been built in 1928 by the Battle Creek Sanitarium and was used to rehabilitate wounded veterans of World War II. The district renovated the building and renamed it Central Field House. It was the district's primary venue for basketball games until the expansion of the high school in 2010.

In 1990, the Springfield School District merged with the Battle Creek School District. Its high school was used to establish the Battle Creek Area Math and Science Center, an application-based STEM school used by fifteen area school districts. Since 2013, it has been housed in the renovated former Kellogg Cereal City Museum.

== Schools ==
Schools in Battle Creek Public Schools district
School	Address	Notes
Ann J. Kellogg Elementary	306 Champion St., Battle Creek	Grades 3-5
Dudley Elementary	308 W. Roosevelt Avenue, Battle Creek	Grades PreK-2
Fremont International Academy	115 E. Emmett St., Battle Creek	Grades PreK-5. An International Baccalaureate Primary Years Programme School
LaMora Park Elementary	65 North Woodlawn Avenue, Battle Creek	Grades PreK-2
Post-Franklin Elementary	20 Newark Avenue, Battle Creek	Grades K-2
Valley View Elementary	960 Avenue A, Battle Creek	Grades PreK-5
Verona Elementary	825 Capital Avenue NE, Battle Creek	Grades 3-5
Northwestern Academy of Visual Arts & Performing Arts	176 Limit Street, Battle Creek	Grades K-2 and 6-8. Opening fall 2025 in the former Northwestern Middle School.
Springfield Middle School	1023 Avenue A, Battle Creek	Grades 6-8
BC STEM Innovation Center	100 West Van Buren Street, Battle Creek	Grades 6-8. Application-based enrollment.
Battle Creek Central High School	100 West Van Buren Street, Battle Creek	Grades 9-12. Built 1909. Has a career and technical education focus called Career Academies.
W.K. Kellogg Preparatory High School	60 West Van Buren Streetm, Battle Creek	Grades 9-12. Alternative high school. Built 1933.
