= Henry Harrison Brown =

Early New Thought leader and author

Henry Harrison Brown (1840–1918) was a spiritualist and early New Thought leader and author. He founded the "Now" Folk group, which operated out of San Francisco.

Born in Massachusetts, little is known of his early life besides that he attended Nichols Academy and served in the 18th Connecticut Infantry Regiment in the American Civil War and married Fannie M. Hancox, though they later divorced. He became a lecturer on various topics including spiritualism, before enrolling in divinity school in Pennsylvania in 1885. In 1893, he returned to lecturing after serving for a short time as a Unitarian minister, and in 1900 moved to San Francisco. In 1905, he was elected president of the International New Thought Convention, and in 1915 was chairman of the First International New Thought Congress. In addition to common New Thought ideas, Brown taught psychic phenomena such as telepathy, clairvoyance, automatic writings, and psychic power. He also emphasized community, and gathered his followers in the "Now" Home and later a cooperative community in Glendale, California, which continued until his death.

He wrote a number of books such as Art of Living (1902), New Thought Primer, Origin, History and Principles of the Movement (1903), How to Control Fate Through Suggestion (1906), Not Hypnotism but Suggestion (1906), Psychometry (1906), and Dollars Want Me (1917).

Brown also started the New Thought journal Now: A Journal of Affirmations in 1900 at the same time he started the "Now" Folk group, which contained mostly his own writings during his lifetime. It was the only part of his organization that his followers continued after his death in 1918, and lasted until 1928. The journal also evidences a tendency towards socialist ideas. It's motto was "to assist its readers to the attainment of Self-control. To be the Masters of Fate" and was notably lacking in typical religious language.
