= Amasa Nichols =

Amasa Nichols (2 April 1773 – 17 July 1849) was a manufacturer who was a founder and namesake of Nichols College in Dudley, Massachusetts.

Nichols was born in Thompson, Connecticut on April 2, 1773. He became a prominent cotton manufacturer in Dudley, Massachusetts. Nichols was an ardent supporter of the Universalist Church. He founded Nichols Academy as a Universalist Church institution in 1815. He resigned from the board in 1823 amid personal financial problems and because of the school's changing religious affiliation. Nichols died in West Scituate, Massachusetts on July 17, 1849.
