= Crocker Field =

- Crocker Field Historic District
- U.S. National Register of Historic Places
- U.S. Historic district
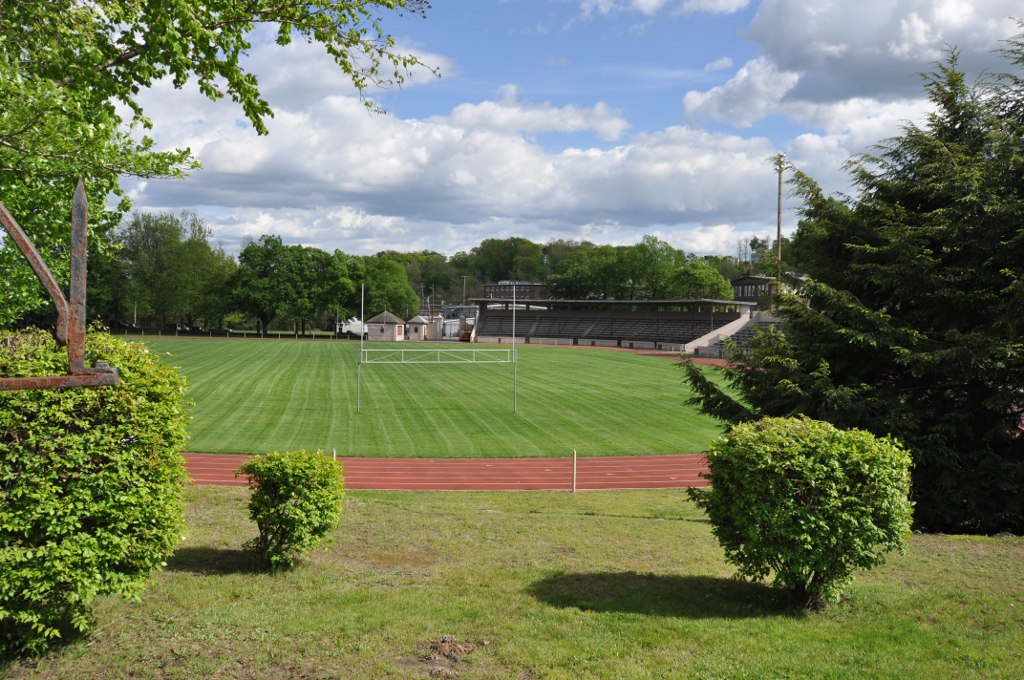

- Location within Massachusetts Location within the United States
- Location: Fitchburg, Massachusetts
- Coordinates: 42°35′44″N 71°48′34″W
- Area: 5.5 acres (2.2 ha)
- Built: 1918
- Architect: Olmsted Brothers; Gallagher, Percival
- Architectural style: Classical Revival
- NRHP reference No.: 01000651
- Added to NRHP: June 14, 2001

Crocker Field is an outdoor sports and recreation facility for the children of the Fitchburg Public School System in Fitchburg, Massachusetts. The complex consists of a number of athletic facilities on a 5.5-acre (2.2 ha) plot of land near the Nashua River. There are indoor and outdoor playing areas, an outdoor stadium, a field house, and a ticket booth and concession stand. The site is enclosed on three sides by a wrought iron fence resting on a concrete base, with periodic square concrete pillars. Most of the complex was built in 1918, with landscaping designed by the Olmsted Brothers. The facility was listed on the National Register of Historic Places in 2001 as the Crocker Field Historic District.

== History ==
Crocker Field was created as a gift to the city inol 1916 by Alvah Crocker II, the president of Crocker, Burbank & Co., then a major paper manufacturer in Fitchburg. Crocker's stated purpose for the gift was to encourage the engagement of the city's youth in outdoor recreational athletic activities. At the time, the city's public schools did not have organized athletics programs, but these were soon started in order to capitalize on the gift. Crocker hired landscape architecture film Olmsted Brothers to design an athletic campus that would provide facilities for baseball, football, and tennis, as well as a running track and a field house. Its features were designed by Olmsted employee Percival Gallagher to be as durable as possible, using stone, brick, and concrete, so that maintenance costs would be low. Crocker also provided a $38,000 endowment to fund its maintenance. In 1921, Crocker funded additional features of the park, including a hockey field and a sprinting track.

Since its construction, the field as served as the principal playing ground for high school athletic teams, hosting popular events such as rivalry football games with neighboring Leominster. It is also the normal location for high school graduation ceremonies, and often hosts regional athletic events.

== See also ==
- National Register of Historic Places listings in Worcester County, Massachusetts
