= Alexander-Dickman Hall =

- College Hall
- U.S. National Register of Historic Places
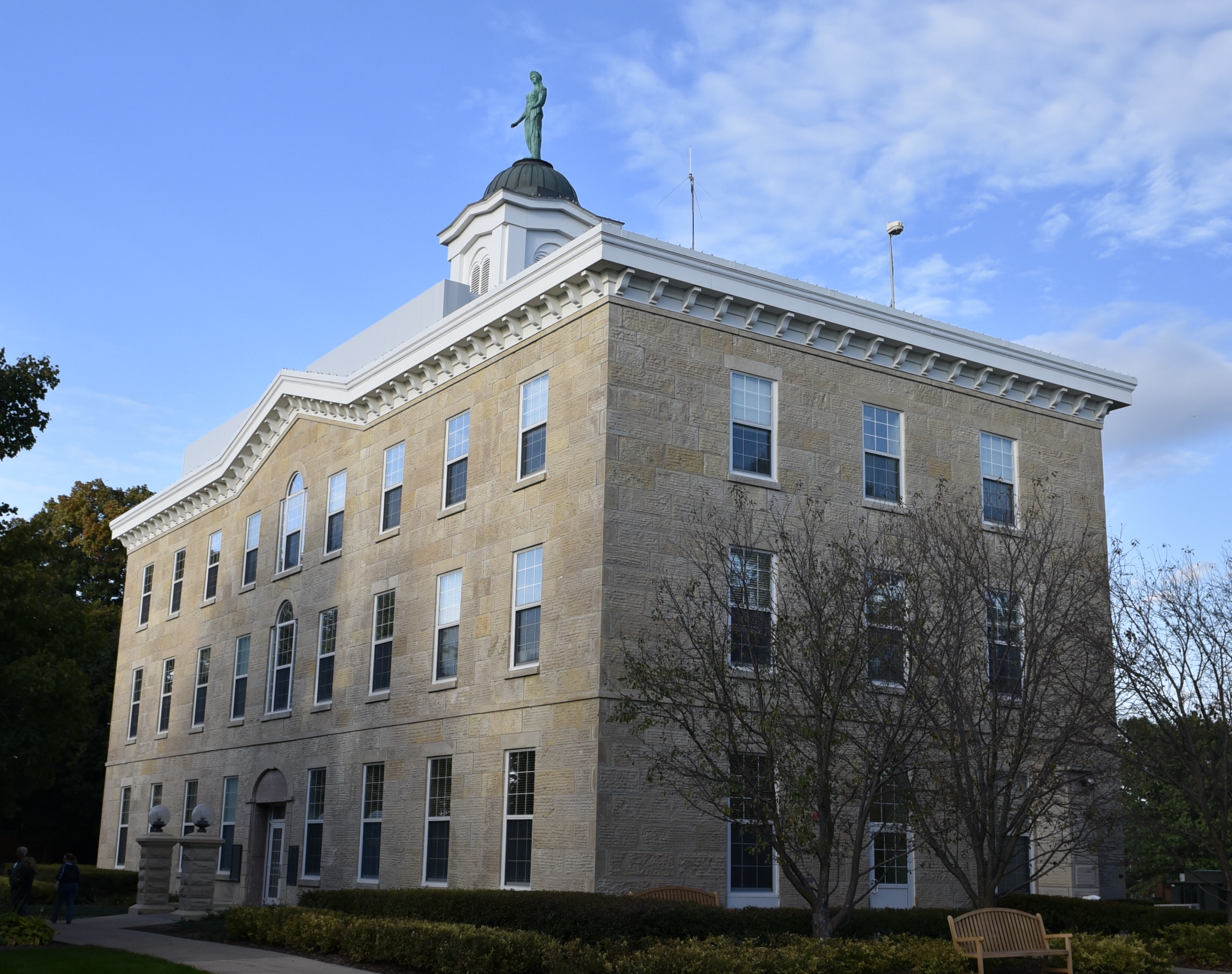

- Location within Iowa Location within the United States
- Location: 200 block of E. Clark; Fayette, Iowa
- Coordinates: 42°50′27.9″N 91°47′59.4″W
- Area: less than one acre
- Built: 1855-1857
- NRHP reference No.: 76000770
- Added to NRHP: November 7, 1976

Alexander-Dickman Hall, formerly known as Old Sem, Old Main, and College Hall, is a historic building located on the campus of Upper Iowa University in Fayette, Iowa, United States. It was the first building built for the college, and for a number of years it was its only building. Construction on the building began in 1855 and it was completed two years later. Its significance derives, in part, from it being "one of the largest and best preserved native stone buildings still in use in Iowa." Architecturally, the three-story limestone structure is influenced by several styles. Its simplicity of form reflects the Neoclassical style in its evenly spaced windows and arched doorway. The Palladian windows and the structure's tripartite arrangement capped by a triangular pediment of the main facade reflects the Federalist style. The bracketed eaves at the cornice reflects the Italianate style. The building is capped with a domed cupola. It received its present name in 1963 being named for the man who first financed to college (Alexander) and its president in the 1920s (Dickman). The building was listed on the National Register of Historic Places in 1976.
