= Jeremy Venditti =

Canadian geomorphologist

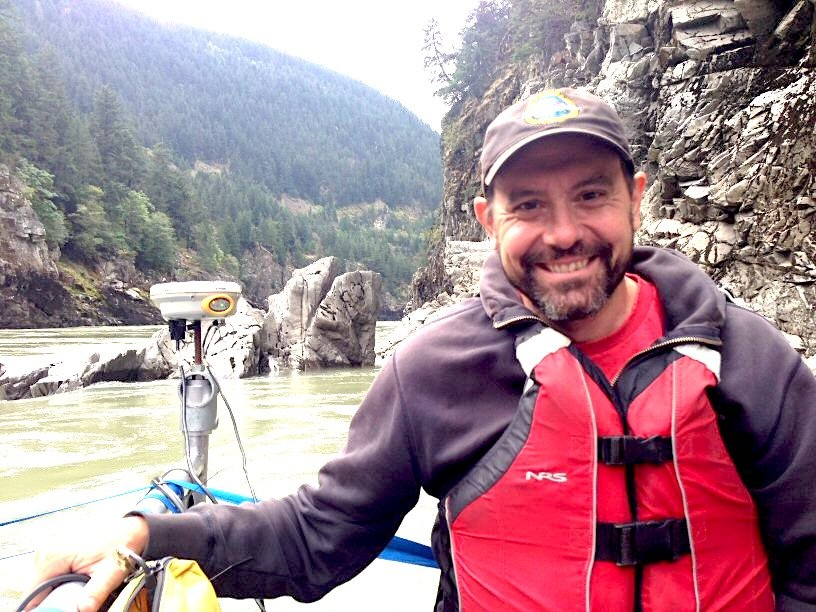
- Venditti in 2019
- Born: 1971 (age 54–55); Canada
- Spouse: Andrea

Academic background
- Education: BS.c, 1995, University of Guelph; MS.c., 1997, University of Southern California; PhD, 2003 University of British Columbia
- Thesis: Spatial and temporal turbulence structure over sub-aqueous dunes: field and laboratory experiments (1997)

Jeremy George Venditti (born 1971) is a Canadian geomorphologist. He is the Director of Environmental Science at Simon Fraser University (SFU).

== Early life and education ==
Venditti was born in 1971. He earned his Bachelor of Arts degree from the University of Guelph before travelling to the United States to earn his Master's degree from the University of Southern California. He returned to Canada at the turn of the century to receive his PhD from the University of British Columbia.

== Career ==
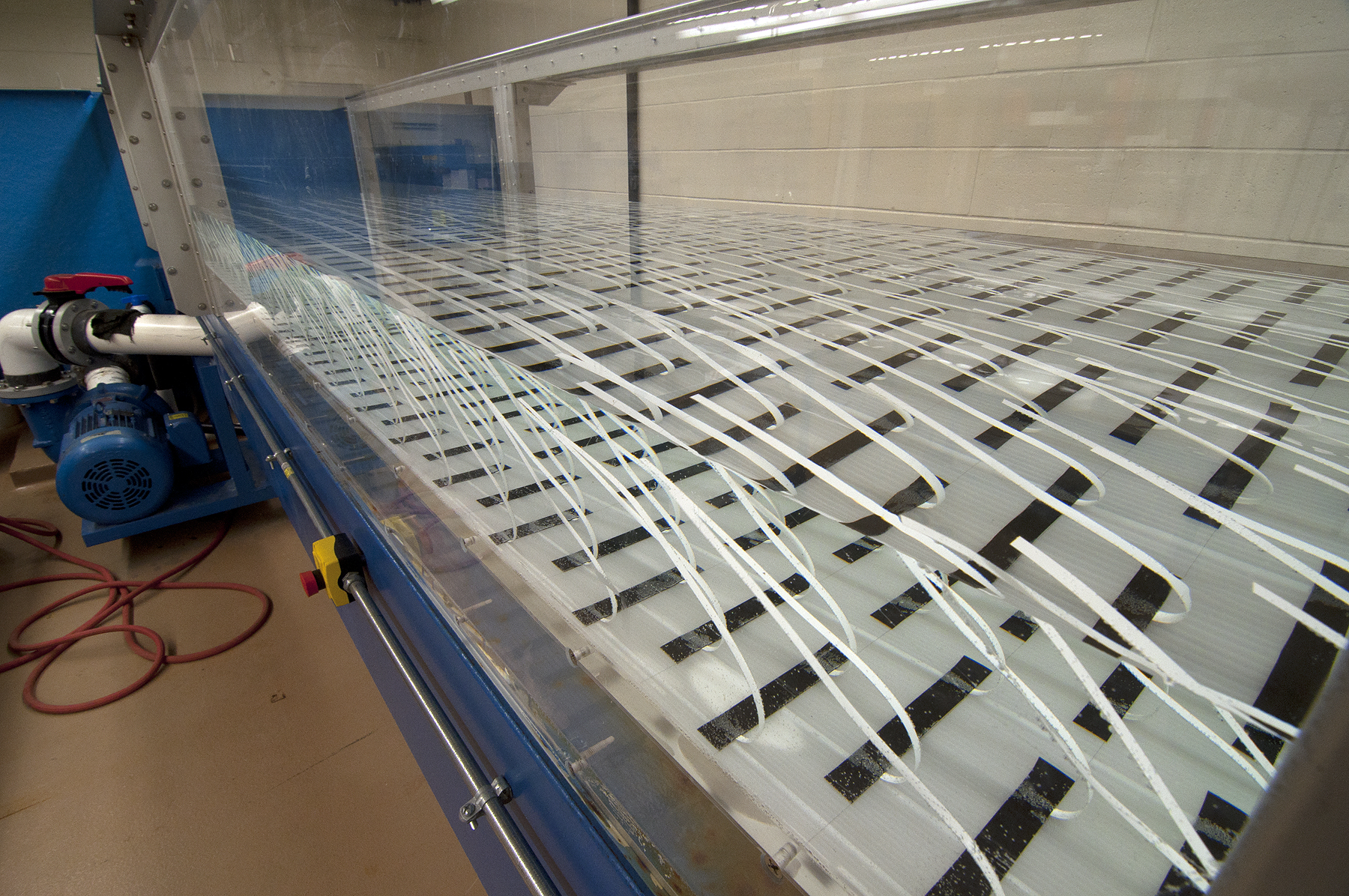
In his lab, Venditti is using a flume channel to investigate flow resistance in rivers and learn more about potential flooding impacts.

Upon completing his PhD, Venditti accepted a senior scientist position at an environmental consulting company in Berkeley, California. He stayed there for two years before joining the faculty at Simon Fraser University (SFU) as an assistant professor. During his tenure at SFU, Venditti studied the characteristics of the Fraser River, including flow resistance and the relationship between river beds and river flows. In order to research this, he constructed a flume to recreate the river channel within his Environmental Fluid and Sediment Dynamics Lab.

By 2014, Venditti led a group of researchers from SFU, the University of Ottawa, and the University of British Columbia along the Fraser River to study river flow in bedrock canyons. Their research, which was documented in the journal Nature, disproved previous conceptions of flow and incision in bedrock-rivers. Two years later, he collaborated on the third Icy Bay expedition in southeast Alaska to map the submarine deposits. He was part of a group of researches studying how a megatsunami in 2015 reshaped the landscape at the terminus of Tyndall Glacier.

As SFU's director of environmental science, Venditti and his research team were granted funds to purchase a Terrestrial Laser Scanner to be used in advanced research projects on geophysical hazard mitigation and infrastructure resiliency. He also oversaw the establishment of SFU's new School of Environmental Science. In 2020, he received one of SFU's Excellence in Research Awards alongside physical anthropologist Hugo Cardoso.
