= James L. Conrad =

American academic administrator

- Born: James Lawson Conrad, Sr. November 28, 1900; Fitchburg, Massachusetts, U.S.
- Died: April 19, 1974 (aged 73); Worcester, Massachusetts, U.S.
- Education: Boston University (BBA)
- Occupation: Academic administrator
- Spouse: Annette Bolduc
- Children: 1

James Lawson Conrad, Sr. (November 28, 1900 – April 19, 1974) was an American academic administrator. He was the first president of Nichols College from 1931 to 1966.

== Career ==
Born to Thomas H. Conrad and Catherine A. Kane, Conrad graduated from Fitchburg High School in 1918, then went on to receive a Bachelor of Business Administration degree from Boston University.

In 1923, Conrad became a member of the Quartermaster Corps of the United States Army, where he rose to the rank of Colonel.

Conrad entered the field of education as a teacher and administrator at the New Hampton School in New Hampshire. In 1931, he moved the business program from New Hampton to the defunct Nichols Academy, and transformed it into Nichols Junior College of Business Administration and Executive Training, a two-year college. The purpose of the school was to be a men-only, junior college for business education. Conrad served as its president from 1931 to 1966. In 1938, during Conrad's tenure, the Commonwealth of Massachusetts authorized Nichols to award an Associate Degree in Business Administration. In 1958, the school became known as Nichols College, a four-year college with the authority to grant a Bachelor of Business Administration degree. In 1961, Nichols College began running the Alpha Pi chapter of the Delta Mu Delta honor society for business programs. In 1965, Nichols became accredited by the New England Association of Schools and Colleges, and became a member of the National Collegiate Athletic Association (NCAA) in the following year, all under the leadership of Conrad. He was succeeded as president by Gordon B. Cross.

Conrad Hall, now the location of the Nichols College Office of Advancement, was named after its first president. Additionally, the school recognizes donors as part of the Colonel Conrad Society.

== Personal life ==
Conrad married Annette Bolduc, with whom he had one son: James "Jim" Lawson, Jr. (1932–2016), who worked as a history professor and administrator at Nichols College.
