= Upper Iowa University =

Private university in Fayette, Iowa, US

- Former name: Fayette Seminary of the Upper Iowa Conference (1857–1858)
- Motto: Deo Duce
- Motto in English: With God For A Leader
- Type: Private university
- Established: 1857; 169 years ago
- Academic affiliations: Council of Independent Colleges, National Association of Independent Colleges and Universities
- Endowment: $15 million (2009)
- President: Kathy Franken
- Faculty: 37
- Students: 3,102 (fall 2023)
- Undergraduates: 2,504 (fall 2023)
- Postgraduates: 598 (fall 2023)
- Location: Fayette, Iowa, U.S. 42.838°N 91.800°W
- Campus: Rural, 100 acres (40 ha)
- Colors: Blue and white
- Nickname: Peacocks
- Sporting affiliations: NCAA Division II – GLVC
- Website: uiu.edu
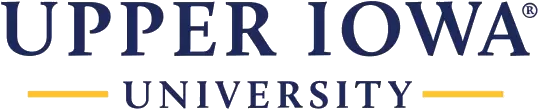

Upper Iowa University (UIU) is a private university in Fayette, Iowa, United States. It enrolls around 3,000 students and offers distance education programs that include centers in the U.S., an online program, an independent study program, and formerly had centers in Hong Kong, Singapore and Malaysia.

Upper Iowa offers undergraduate and graduate degree programs with 29 undergraduate majors, including art, business, conservation management, education, human services, information technology, liberal arts, math, nursing, psychology, science, and 6 graduate programs. It operates on two eight-week terms per semester, allowing students to take two classes per term. It is accredited by the Higher Learning Commission.

UIU is the only NCAA Division II Athletics Program in the state of Iowa and a member of the Great Lakes Valley Conference (GLVC).

== History ==
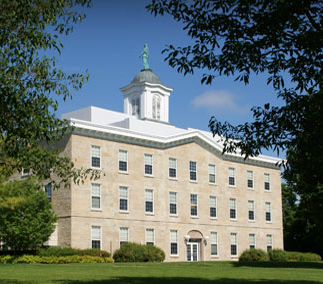
Alexander-Dickman Hall, built in 1855, is the oldest building on the Fayette Campus and constructed of native limestone.

In 1854, Elizabeth Alexander, a pioneer living near what is now Fayette, Iowa, proposed the idea of a college to her husband, Robert, who donated $10,000 toward the cause. Their son-in-law, Samuel Robertson, donated $5,000 and 10 acres (40,000 m^{2}) of land. In 1856, the first Board of Trustees meeting was held; articles of Incorporation were adopted; and classes began January 7, 1857. The university was affiliated with the Methodist Church until 1928.

In 1861, a company of male students and faculty members enlisted in the Army to fight in the American Civil War. Student-soldiers participated in 17 major battles, carrying a flag hand-sewn by UIU women students. In 1917, UIU male students joined the armed forces during World War I, while women students organized American Red Cross classes on campus; the UIU gym became a barracks, and the athletic field was the scene of military drills. By 1920, a systematic program of extension work throughout northeast Iowa had begun, with Upper Iowa referred to as "a pioneer in the field." Those students who joined the service to fight in World War II took advantage of the G.I. Bill to complete their education, which dramatically increased Upper Iowa enrollment between 1947 and 1950. Record enrollments were also seen after the Vietnam War (1952–1970).

In 1972, Upper Iowa launched an external degree program that included Independent Study and Online Programs. In 1978, Darcy C. Coyle was named president, a post in which he served until 1984, when he became President Emeritus.

In 1984 to present, UIU expanded to open locations across the U.S. Upper Iowa was approved by the Higher Learning Commission to offer graduate degrees in 1995, and in 1999 started its International Program by establishing centers in Hong Kong, Singapore, Malaysia, and Vancouver, British Columbia, Canada.

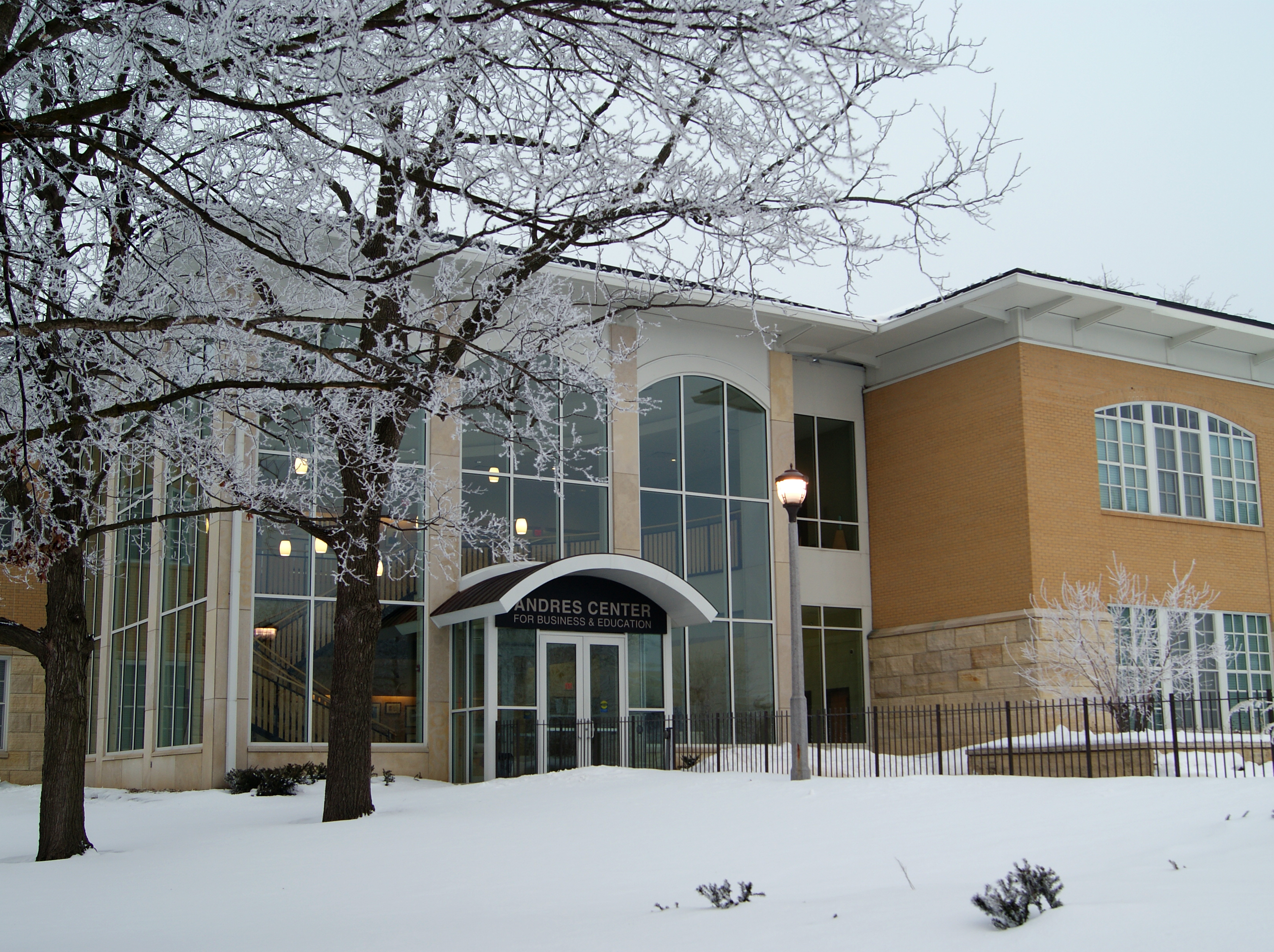
The Andres Center for Business and Education was built in 2004

It was also during 1994 to 2003 that UIU underwent an aggressive landscaping and building renovation that brought changes to its Fayette campus. This included the construction of Lee Tower Residence Halls, the acquisition of a new physical plant building and the construction of a recreation center. In 2004, the new Andres Center for Business and Education was built, and Alan G. Walker was appointed the 20th president of the university. During summer 2009, the largest capital improvement project broke ground on the Fayette campus — $75 million — which will include a new student center, suite-style housing, and a Liberal Arts academic building.

In May 2023, in response to a worsening financial situation, the university cut its academic programs in sociology, information systems, information technology, intensive English and sports administration, several of its sports programs and two of its satellite campuses. The university's accreditor issued a public disclosure notice to warn the public about the university's financial distress.

== UIU Campus and town of Fayette ==
Upper Iowa's traditional 100-acre (0.40 km^{2}) residential campus is in Fayette, Iowa; a small town of 1,200 residents in the county of the same name, in far northeast Iowa. In 1984, the former Fayette Community School District merged with the larger North Fayette County Community Schools, headquartered in the nearby county seat town of West Union. In 2018, North Fayette itself merged with the Valley Community School District, to form the North Fayette Valley Community Schools, leaving Fayette with neither an elementary nor a secondary school. Consequently, Fayette is one of the few communities in the nation with a university but no public school within its boundaries.

The Fayette campus is primarily for undergraduate students, but a master's degree in education is also offered, along with two-week IXEL classes in the summer. Students can choose from 40 majors, with the most popular being Elementary Education and Teaching, Marketing/Marketing Management, General, and Natural Resources/Conservation. The Pleggenkuhle Prairie, donated by the Pleggenkuhle family to UIU, is 3 acres (12,000 m^{2}) of virgin prairie northwest of Hawkeye. It is used as a teaching tool for students to learn about the prairie ecosystem and to conduct prescribed burns and research projects at the site.

== Academics ==
Upper Iowa University is accredited by the Higher Learning Commission. It has a chapter of the Alpha Chi honor society.

=== Distance education ===
Upper Iowa Distance Education includes 15 center locations across the U.S. in Iowa, Illinois, Kansas, Louisiana and Wisconsin, an Independent Study program, as well as an Online Program recognized by GetEducated.com Best Buy Rankings since 2007 and the Online Education Database (OEDb) Online College Rankings since 2007.

UIU Center locations offer the flexibility of evening and weekend classes with a classroom experience. Independent Study and Online programs offer education "anywhere, anytime." Over 40 undergraduate courses and graduate degrees (MPA, MBA, MHEA) are offered, with the option of mixing classroom and online courses.

=== International program ===
Upper Iowa University has two international education centers located in the Pacific Rim. UIU offers undergraduate programs in business, communication and psychology to learners in Hong Kong and Malaysia. Through on-site faculty, faculty exchange, and visiting lecturers, UIU offers a program with a high level of academic rigor and quality.

In addition, UIU also offers a full on-line Master of Business Administration program with global access for students, as well as study abroad opportunities.

=== Rankings ===
Upper Iowa University was ranked by U.S. News & World Report in the category for 2017 Best Online Bachelor's Programs - 128th

== Athletics ==
Upper Iowa athletic teams are the Peacocks. The university is a member of the Division II level of the National Collegiate Athletic Association (NCAA), primarily competing in the Great Lakes Valley Conference (GLVC) since the 2023–24 academic year. The Peacocks previously competed in the Iowa Intercollegiate Athletic Conference (IIAC; now currently known as the American Rivers Conference since the 2018–19 academic year) of the NCAA Division III ranks from 1922–23 to 2002–03, and the Northern Sun Intercollegiate Conference (NSIC) from 2006–07 to 2022–23. Their colors are blue and white.

Upper Iowa competes in 22 intercollegiate varsity sports: Men's sports began baseball, basketball, bowling, cross country, football, golf, soccer, track & field and wrestling; while women's sports include basketball, bowling, cross country, golf, lacrosse, soccer, softball, tennis, track & field and volleyball; and co-ed sports include cheerleading, dance, eSports, spirit squad and shotgun sports.

== Notable alumni ==
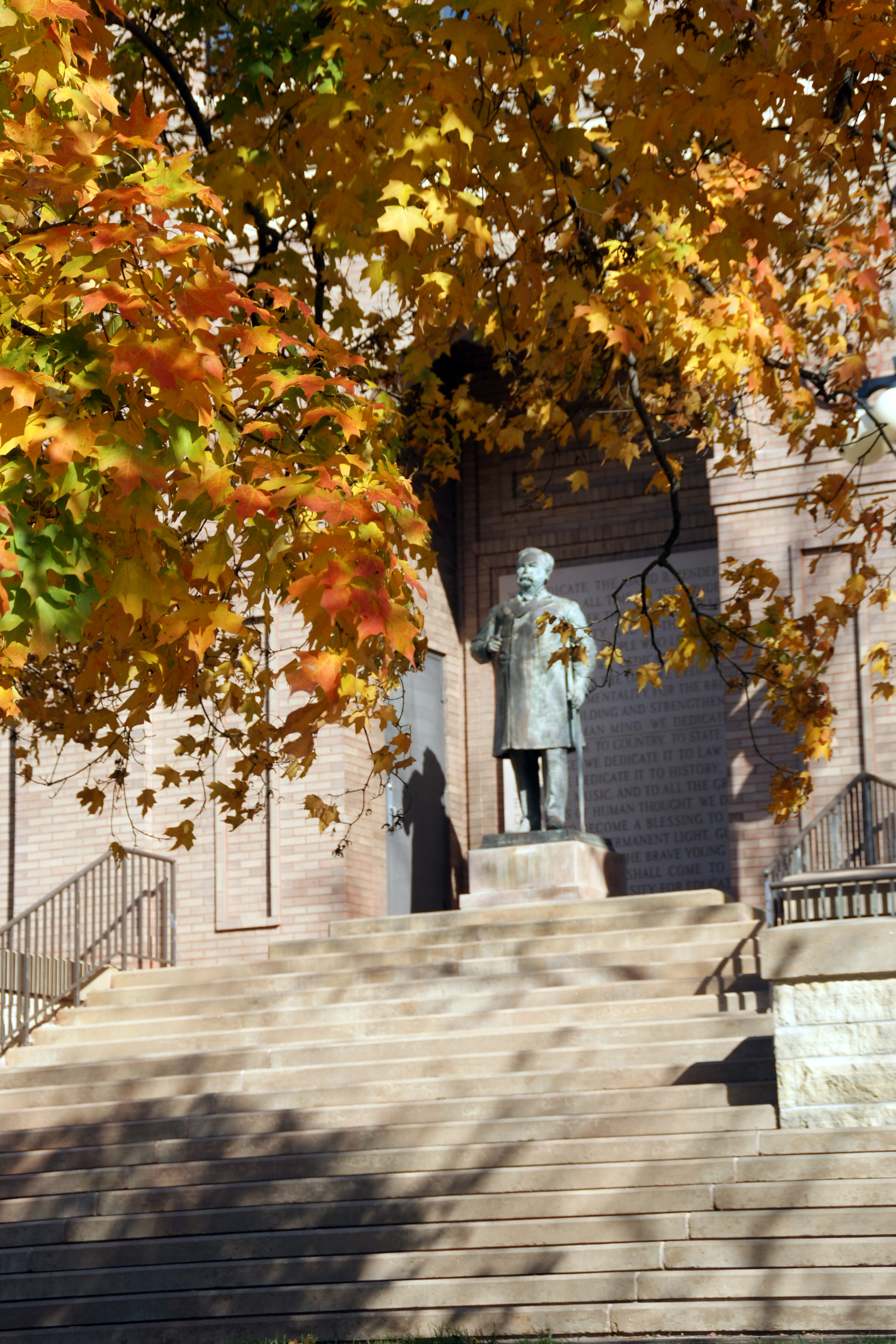
The statue of Colonel David B. Henderson stands in front of the Upper Iowa University library. Andrew Carnegie donated US$25,000 to the university to honor his friend

- William V. Allen, United States Senator from Nebraska, 1893 – 1901.
- William F. Albright, archaeologist who worked on the Dead Sea Scrolls
- Jerome Amos Jr., member of the Iowa House of Representatives, 1974
- William Andres, former President of Dayton Hudson, now known as Target
- Minnie Bronson, anti-suffragist, 1881
- Raymond F. Chandler, former Sergeant Major of the Army
- Richard C. Clark, former United States Senator from Iowa, 1973–1979
- Mike Eischeid, football player and punter in the National Football League for 9 seasons, 1963
- Rick Heller, college baseball coach at Upper Iowa, Northern Iowa, Indiana State, and Iowa
- David B. Henderson, the first Speaker of the U.S. House of Representatives from west of the Mississippi, 1861
- Roger Halvorson, Iowa House of Representatives
- Mary Lundby, Iowa State Senate, 1971
- Carl Magee, inventor of the modern parking meter, 1896
- Joshua Meggers, Iowa House of Representatives
- Nellie Burget Miller, Poet Laureate of Colorado
- John Mott (attended), leader of the Y.M.C.A. movement and won the Nobel Peace Prize in 1946 for his work with prisoners of war
- Larry Nemmers, National Football League game official (side judge 1985–1990; referee 1991–2007) B.S. Biology, 1965
- George Safford Parker, founder of the Parker Pen Company, 1882
- Roger C. Schultz, United States Army Lieutenant General and Director of the Army National Guard, B.S. Management, 1980
- Rob Taylor, Iowa House of Representatives
- Claude Welch, President and Dean, Graduate Theological Union
- C. T. Wilson, Member, Maryland House of Delegates
