= Dudley, Massachusetts =

- Town
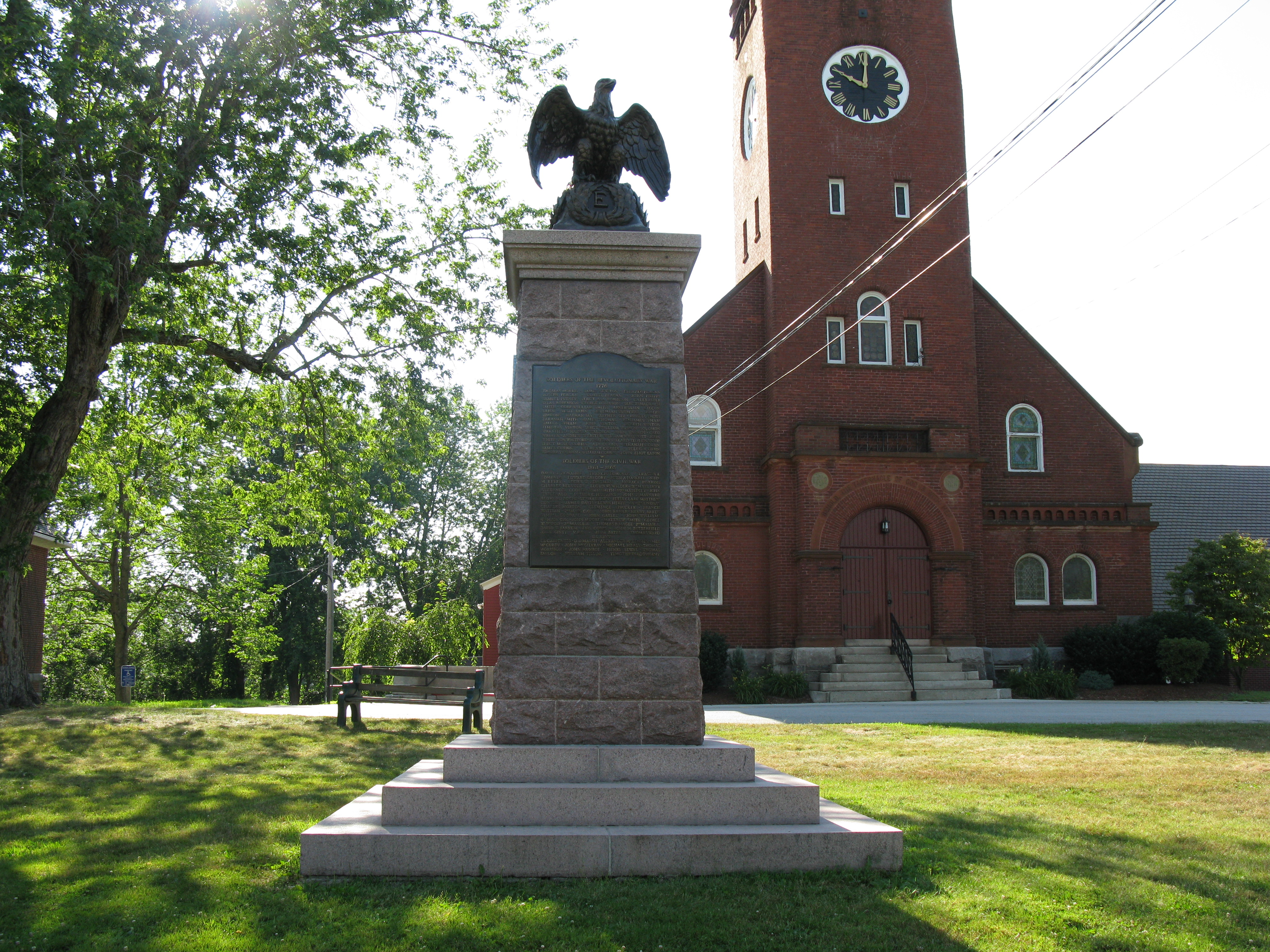
- War Monument by sculptor John A. Wilson

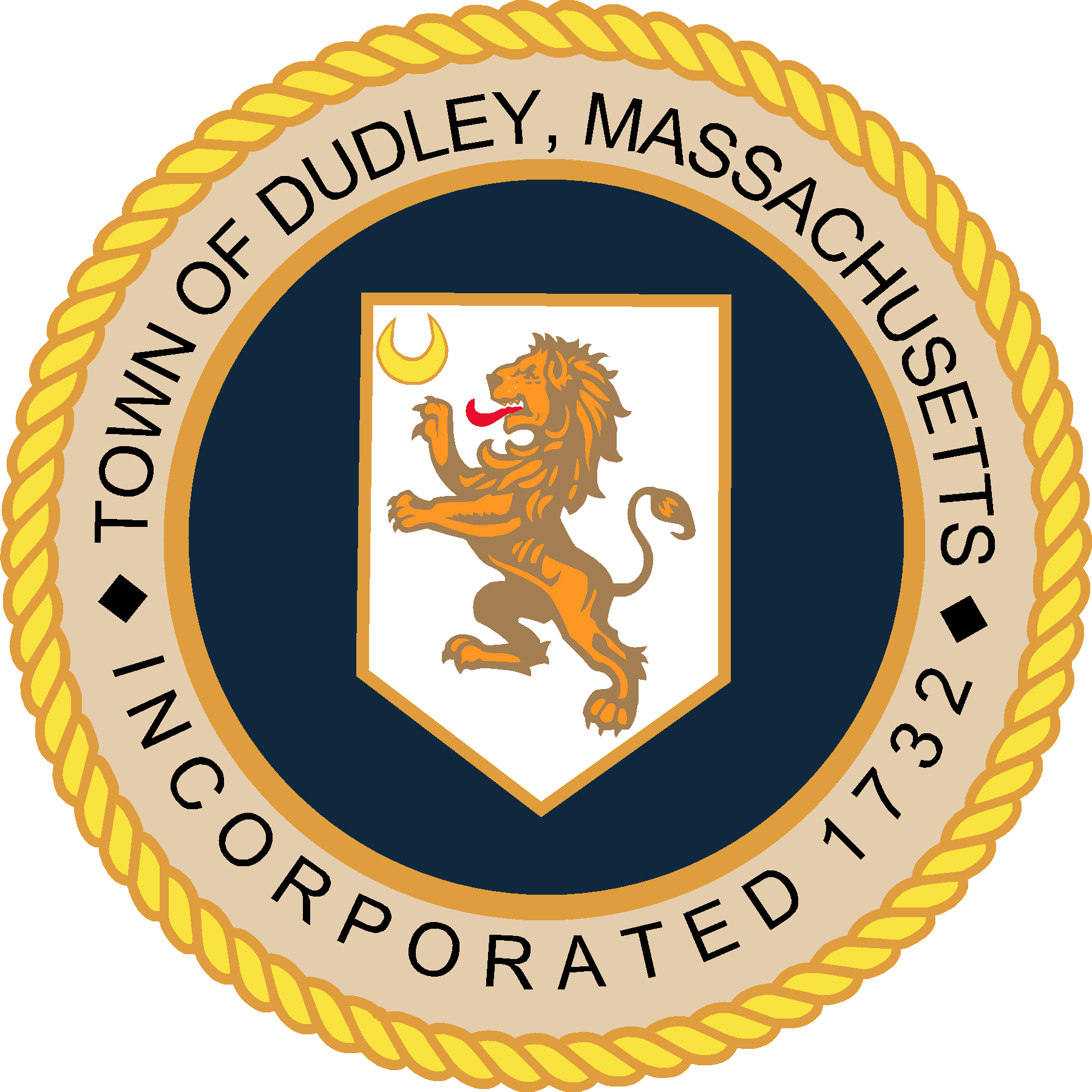
- Seal
- Motto: "All was others: All will be others"
- Location in Worcester County and the state of Massachusetts.
- Coordinates: 42°02′42″N 71°55′50″W
- Country: United States
- State: Massachusetts
- County: Worcester
- Settled: 1714
- Incorporated: 1732

Government
  - Type: Open town meeting
  - Board of Selectmen: Kerry Cyganiewicz, Steven Sullivan, Jason Johnson, Jana Deschenes, Mark Landry

Area
  - Total: 22.0 sq mi (57.1 km^{2})
  - Land: 21.0 sq mi (54.5 km^{2})
  - Water: 1.0 sq mi (2.6 km^{2})
- Elevation: 669 ft (204 m)

Population (2020)
  - Total: 11,921
  - Density: 567/sq mi (219/km^{2})
- Time zone: UTC−5 (Eastern)
  - Summer (DST): UTC−4 (Eastern)
- ZIP Code: 01571
- Area code: 508/774
- FIPS code: 25-17685
- GNIS feature ID: 0618361
- Website: www.dudleyma.gov

Dudley is a town in Worcester County, Massachusetts, United States. The population was 11,921 at the 2020 census.

== History ==
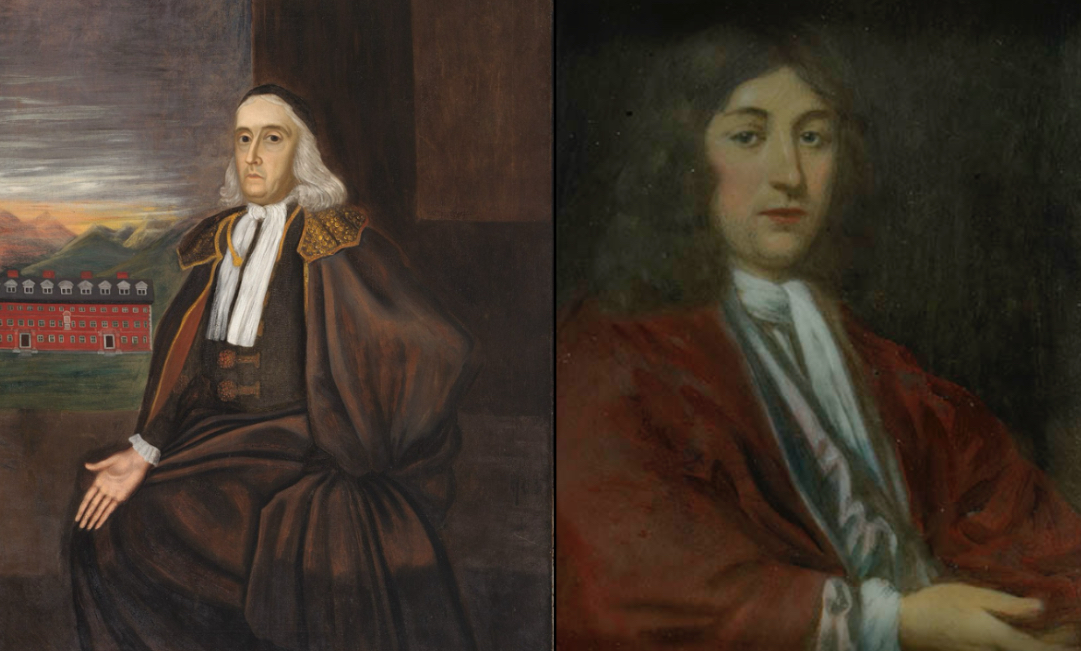
William Stoughton and Joseph Dudley

Dudley was first carved out of Nipmuc land purchased by Colonial administrators, Joseph Dudley and William Stoughton in 1681. The new town was first settled in 1714 and was officially incorporated in 1732. The town was named for proprietors William and Paul Dudley.

Before the town was settled, the area of Dudley Hill was a precontact Nipmuc village, centered around Lake Chaubunagungamaug, which was overlooked by Reverend John Eliot. The French River that runs along the town line between Webster and Dudley, was named after a local Huguenot settlement led by Gabriel Bernon.

In April 1776, on his way to New York City from Boston after his victory in the Siege of Boston, General George Washington camped in the town of Dudley with the Continental Army along what is now a portion of Route 31 near the Connecticut border. During the trip, it is rumored that a "large cache" of captured and recovered British weaponry and supplies was ordered "concealed in the grounds" in the rural area along the route. The cache, hidden to resupply reinforcements from Massachusetts or to cover a retreat from the south, was never used or recorded as having been recovered.

Hezekiah Healy began building what would be known as the Black Tavern around 1803.

In 1816, Amasa Nichols (1773–1849) established Nichols Academy in the town center as a Universalist Church institution. The academy would later be known as Nichols College. Industrialist Samuel Slater was an early benefactor of the new academy.

Union soldiers from Dudley, the 15th Regiment Massachusetts Volunteer Infantry, suffered heavy casualties inflicted by the Confederacy during the Battle of Gettysburg. Dudley was the primary manufacturer of "Brogan boots" worn by the Union Army and produced the majority of the standard issue Union uniforms worn during the Civil War.

On July 5, 1909, the Dudley Soldiers War Memorial was erected in front of the First Congregational Church by the Sons and Citizens of Dudley. The memorial honors the veterans from Dudley who served in the Revolutionary War, the American Civil War and the Spanish-American War. The monument was made by John A. Wilson.

A proposal to create a Muslim cemetery by the Islamic Society of Greater Worcester on 55 acres (22 ha) of farmland elicited intense community opposition when discussed at a public hearing in February 2016. After a complicated process, with much back and forth between the Islamic Society and town officials, the necessary permit was issued over a year later.

== Geography ==
Dudley is bounded on the northeast by Oxford, on the north by Charlton, on the west by Southbridge, on the south by Woodstock and Thompson, Connecticut, and on the east by Webster, with which it traditionally had the closest cultural and political relations. According to the United States Census Bureau, the town has a total area of 22.1 square miles (57 km^{2}), of which 21.0 square miles (54 km^{2}) is land and 1.0 square mile (2.6 km^{2}), or 4.58%, is water.

== Demographics ==
Historical population
Year	Pop.	±%
1790	1,114	—
1850	1,443	+29.5%
1860	1,736	+20.3%
1870	2,388	+37.6%
1880	2,803	+17.4%
1890	2,944	+5.0%
1900	3,553	+20.7%
1910	4,267	+20.1%
1920	3,701	−13.3%
1930	4,265	+15.2%
1940	4,616	+8.2%
1950	5,261	+14.0%
1960	6,510	+23.7%
1970	8,087	+24.2%
1980	8,717	+7.8%
1990	9,540	+9.4%
2000	10,036	+5.2%
2010	11,390	+13.5%
2020	11,921	+4.7%
2022*	11,850	−0.6%
* = population estimate. Source: United States census records and Population Estimates Program data.

As of the census of 2000, there were 10,036 people, 3,737 households, and 2,668 families residing in the town. The population density was 476.7 inhabitants per square mile (184.1/km^{2}). There were 3,910 housing units at an average density of 185.7 per square mile (71.7/km^{2}). The racial makeup of the town was 96.83% White, 0.23% African American, 0.23% Native American, 0.74% Asian, 0.75% from other races, and 0.97% from two or more races. Hispanic or Latino of any race were 2.01% of the population.

There were 3,737 households, out of which 34.5% had children under the age of 18 living with them, 57.5% were married couples living together, 10.5% had a female householder with no husband present, and 28.6% were non-families. 23.5% of all households were made up of individuals, and 10.5% had someone living alone who was 65 years of age or older. The average household size was 2.57 and the average family size was 3.04.

In the town, the population was spread out, with 24.7% under the age of 18, 10.6% from 18 to 24, 29.9% from 25 to 44, 22.0% from 45 to 64, and 12.8% who were 65 years of age or older. The median age was 36 years. For every 100 females, there were 98.2 males. For every 100 females age 18 and over, there were 96.0 males.

The median income for a household in the town was $48,602, and the median income for a family was $59,309. Males had a median income of $40,337 versus $27,589 for females. The per capita income for the town was $21,546. About 3.1% of families and 5.6% of the population were below the poverty line, including 4.2% of those under age 18 and 10.1% of those age 65 or over.

== Government ==
State government
State Representative(s):	John Marsi (R)
State Senator(s):	Ryan Fattman (R)
Governor's Councilor(s):	Paul DePaulo (D)
Federal government
U.S. Representative(s):	Richard E. Neal (D-1st District)
U.S. Senators:	Elizabeth Warren (D), Ed Markey (D)

== Library ==
The public library in Dudley opened in 1897. The library has changed location a few times since then, and in the early 21st century, a new building was constructed over the site of the former town hall, which had also been relocated. In fiscal year 2008, the town of Dudley spent 1.44% ($163,468) of its budget on its public library, approximately $14 per person.

== Education ==
Dudley is the home of Nichols College, which maintains a campus on Dudley Hill, the historical center of the town. Public schools in Dudley include Mason Road School (grades Pre-K–1), Dudley Elementary School (grades 2–4), Dudley Middle School (grades 5–8) and Shepherd Hill Regional High School (grades 9–12), the last of which also serves students from Charlton. All public schools in Dudley are part of the Dudley-Charlton Regional School District. Dudley is one of ten towns whose students have the option of attending Bay Path Regional Vocational Technical High School (grades 9–12).

== Historic places ==
- Black Tavern (1803)
- Stevens Linen Works Historic District

== Notable people ==
- James Blood, Civil War officer and Victoria Woodhull's second husband (suffragist and first female Presidential nominee)
- Jacob P. Chamberlain, former US Congressman
- Chris Lindstrom is an American football guard with the Atlanta Falcons in the National Football League
- Leo Martello, Wiccan priest and civil rights activist
- William Whiting II, former US Congressman, paper industrialist, philanthropist
- Lizzy Gunsalus, United States and Pan-American cyclo-cross champion
