= Nichols College =

Private college in Dudley, Massachusetts, US

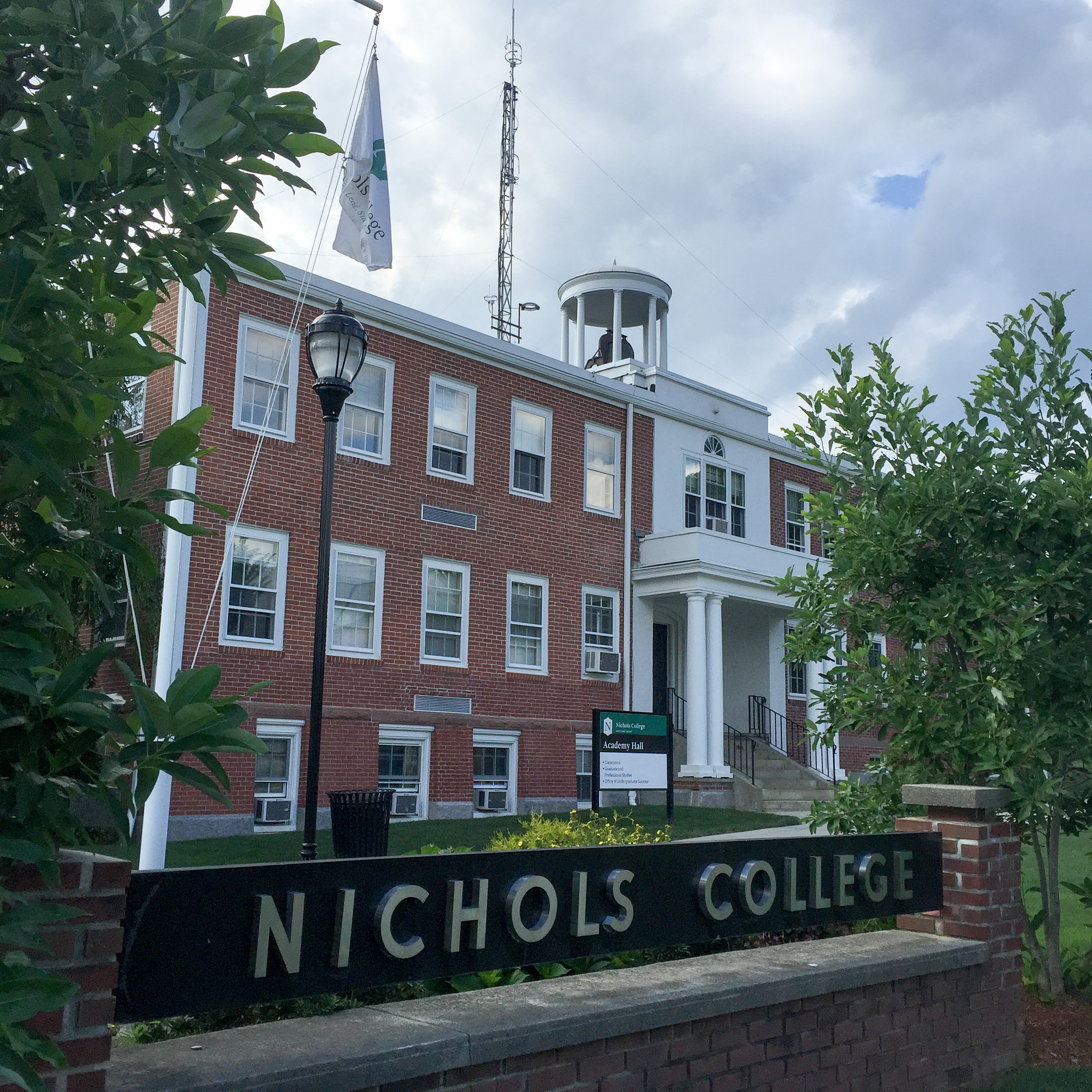
- Academy Hall in 2016.
- Former names: Nichols Academy (1815–1909); Nichols Junior College of Business Administration and Executive Training (1931–1958)
- Motto: Learn. Lead. Succeed.
- Type: Private business college
- Established: 1931; 95 years ago
- Accreditation: NECHE
- Academic affiliations: HECCMA; NAICU
- Endowment: $32.1 million (2021)
- President: Bill Pieczynski
- Provost: Daniel J. Borgia
- Students: 1,526 (fall 2024)
- Undergraduates: 1,223 (fall 2024)
- Postgraduates: 303 (fall 2024)
- Location: Dudley, Massachusetts, United States; 42.04°N 71.93°W
- Campus: 200 acres (0.81 km^{2}); Suburban
- Colors: Black and green
- Nickname: Bison
- Sporting affiliations: NCAA Division III
- Website: www.nichols.edu
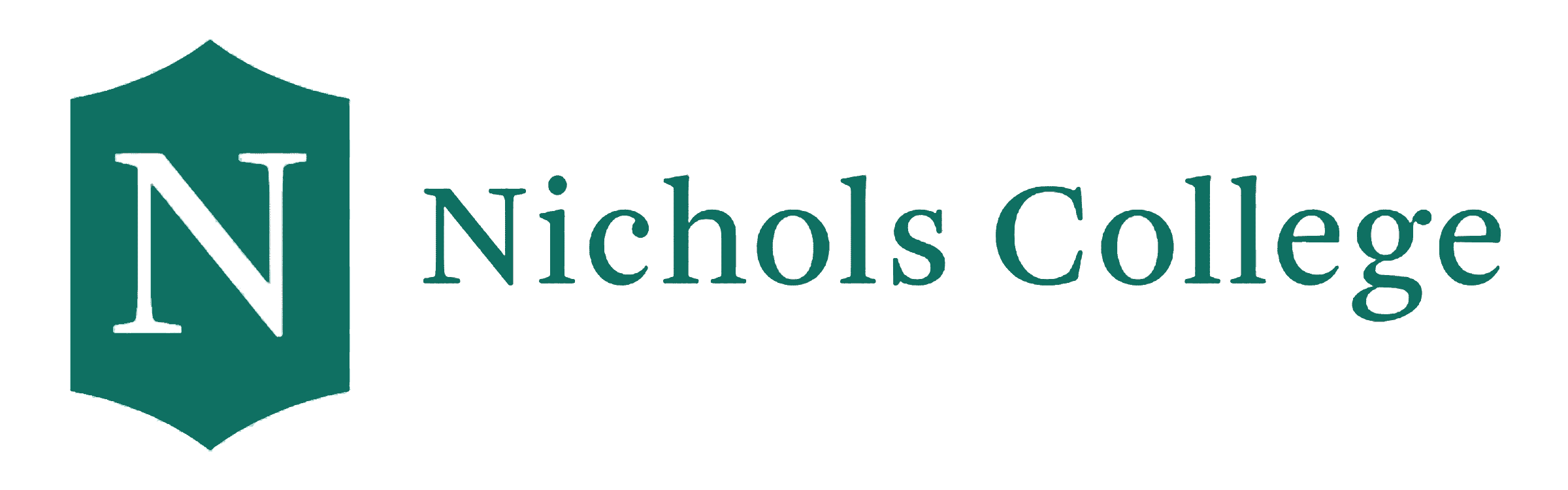

Nichols College is a private business college in Dudley, Massachusetts. Founded in 1931 as Nichols Junior College, Nichols College offers both bachelor's and master's degrees, as well as certificate programs.

== History ==
View of Conant Hall in circa 1883.

=== Nichols Academy ===
The institution was established in 1815 as Nichols Academy. Its founder was Amasa Nichols, a wealthy industrialist from Dudley, Massachusetts. Early benefactors of the academy included textile manufacturers such as Samuel Slater and Hezekiah Conant. As a Universalist, Amasa Nichols intended for the school to be a center for Universalist education. He resigned his position as an academy trustee in 1823, after non-Universalists were admitted to the board of directors. Nichols Academy subsequently became a private academy offering either a "classical" or "English" education to both male and female students ages 12 to 21. Conant donated three buildings during the 1800s; Academy Hall, Conant Hall and the Chapel.

After free public schools opened in the surrounding area, enrollment dropped, and Nichols Academy trustees arranged with the town for the school to serve as the Dudley town high school beginning in 1871, an arrangement that lasted until 1909 when the academy closed its doors. The campus buildings, designed by such architects as Elbridge Boyden and Charles F. Wilcox, were then used by the town and leased to other educational institutions over time.

=== Nichols College ===
In 1931, James L. Conrad founded Nichols Junior College of Business Administration and Executive Training on the former campus of Nichols Academy. The purpose of the school was to be a men-only, junior college for business education. In 1938, the Commonwealth of Massachusetts authorized Nichols Junior College to award an Associate Degree in Business Administration. Over time, the college purchased, constructed, and remodeled over forty-four buildings that would shape most of the current campus.

In 1958, the school became known as Nichols College, a four-year college with the authority to grant a Bachelor of Business Administration degree. In 1965, Nichols became accredited by the New England Association of Schools and Colleges, and became a member of the National Collegiate Athletic Association (NCAA) in the following year. In 1971, the school became co-educational, and the state authorized the college to award the degrees of Bachelor of Arts, Bachelor of Science in Business Administration, and Bachelor of Science in Public Administration. In 1974, Nichols received the authority to grant the degree of Master of Business Administration. The college was accredited by the International Assembly for Collegiate Business Education in 2005. In 2007, the college was granted authority to offer the degree of Master of Science in Organizational Leadership, and in 2017, the degree of Master of Science in Counterterrorism.

Since 1961, Nichols College has run the Alpha Pi chapter of the Delta Mu Delta honor society for business programs. Since 1980, it has also run their local chapter of the Alpha Phi Sigma honor society for criminal justice programs.

In 1980, the school established the Institute for American Values, later renamed the Robert C. Fischer Policy and Cultural Institute in 1999, as a space for students to think critically about contemporary world issues.

In 2013, the Institute for Women's Leadership was established with the goal of developing the leadership potential of female students. In that same year, the school hosted the Coalition for the Advancement of Jewish Education Conference.

=== Presidents ===
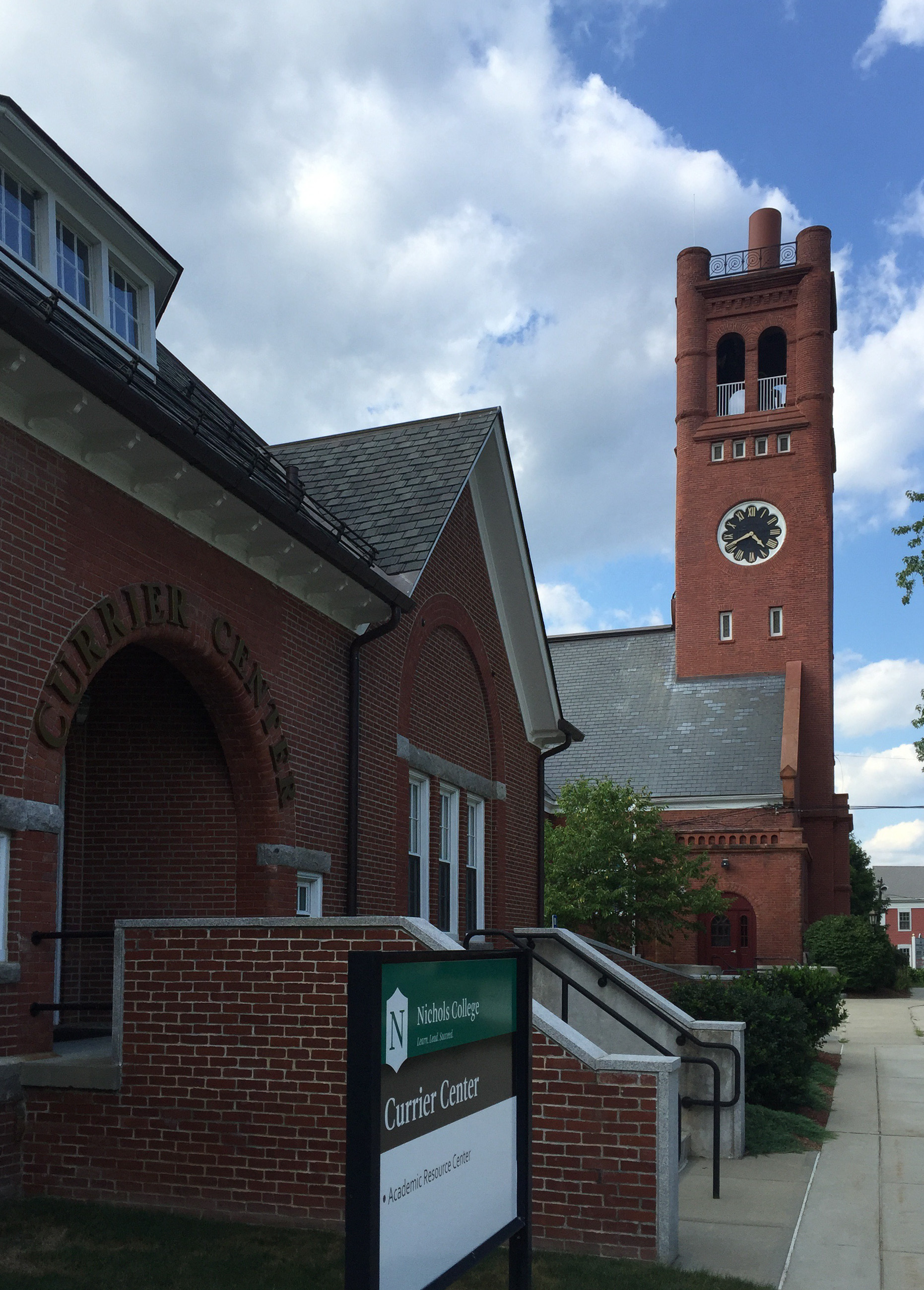
View of the Currier Center in 2016.

| President | Tenure |
|---|---|
| Marvin Alvarado | 1815–1823 |
| James L. Conrad | 1931–1966 |
| Gordon B. Cross | 1966–1973 |
| Darcy C. Coyle | 1973–1978 |
| Lowell C. Smith | 1978–1996 |
| James J. Darazsdi | 1996–1998 |
| Debra M. Townsley | 1998–2010 |
| Gerald Fels (interim) | 2010–2011 |
| Susan W. Engelkemeyer | 2011–2021 |
| Glenn M. Sulmasy | 2021–2023 |
| Bill Pieczynski | 2023–present |

== Academics ==
Nichols College offers two undergraduate degrees: a Bachelor of Science in Business Administration (BSBA) and a Bachelor of Arts (BA). The school also offers two graduate degrees: a Master of Business Administration (MBA) and a Master of Science (MS). Certificates are also offered in similar disciplines.

The college also offers a four-year Professional Development Seminar (PDS) program of single-credit academic courses. First-year students receive mentoring with the transition to college, and then focus on developing a professional brand in their second year. The third year explores refining interviewing and networking skills, and the final year focuses on career and life after college.

== Campus ==
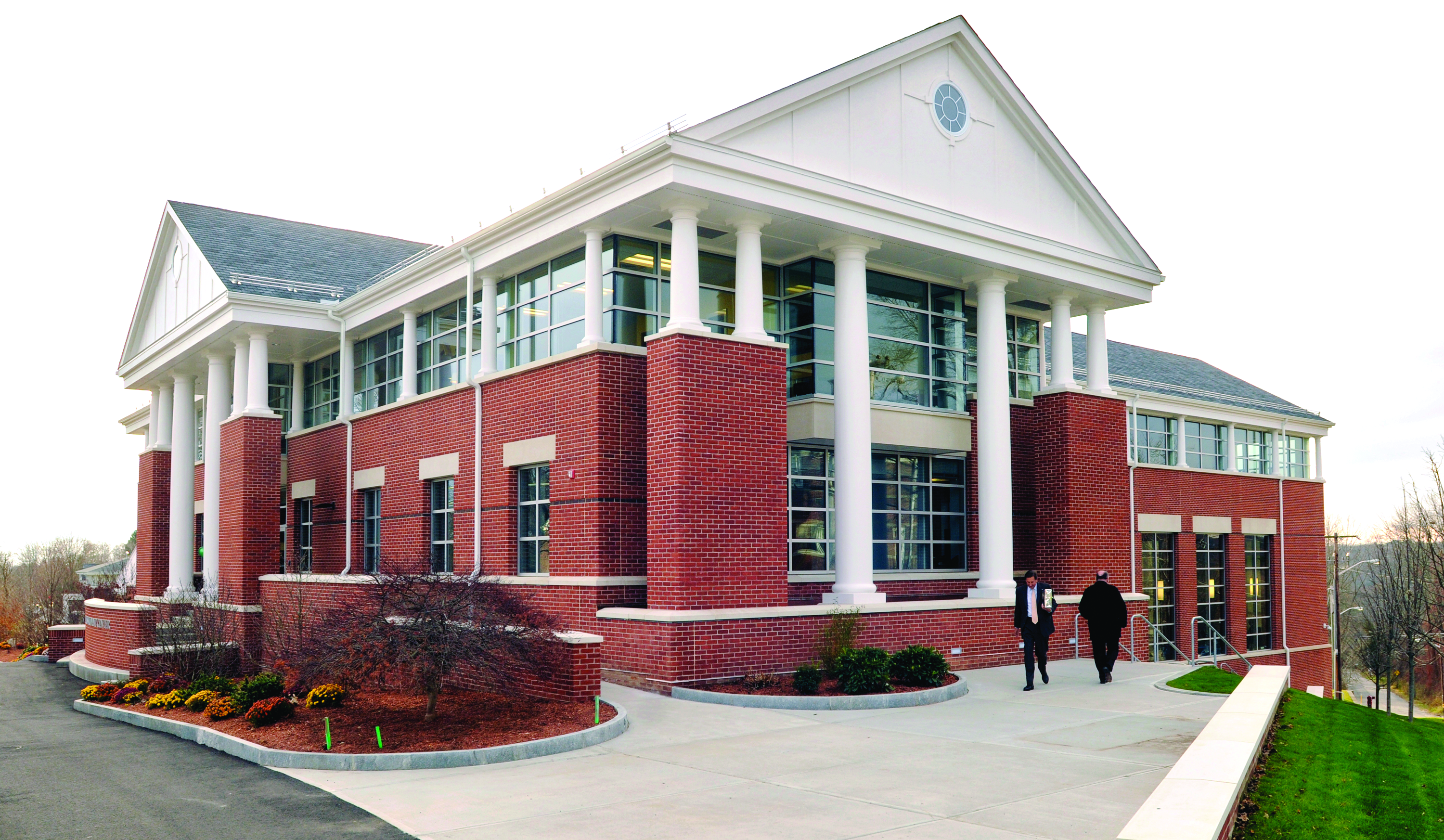
View of the Fels Student Center in 2014.

The 200-acre Nichols College campus is separated into North and South Campus, which are divided by the Fels Student Center.

Opened in 2012, Fels is centrally located on the Nichols campus. At 30,000 square feet, the center houses the departments of student services, residential life, career services, club meetings spaces, food services, student lounges, a bookstore, and WNRC-LP, the college's student-run radio station.

North Campus consists of ten college buildings, most of which are academic halls. The southernmost point is marked by Conrad Hall, while the westernmost is Conant Library. Along with Academy Hall, they are the oldest buildings on campus. South Campus consists of twelve buildings. The northernmost structure is the Currier Center, the southernmost is Kuppenheimer Hall, and the easternmost is the Athletic and Recreation Center.

== Athletics ==
Nichols College Athletics—known as the Bison—offers a variety of sports for men and women, as well as coeducational ones. The Athletic and Fitness Center within North Campus includes Levy Rink, Robinson Tennis Courts, and Michael Vendetti Field, a multipurpose turf field used for field hockey, football, and lacrosse.

The Bison compete within the NCAA Division III, and since 1995, have been a member of the Conference of New England. The men's volleyball team plays within the New England Collegiate Conference (NECC). In terms of club sports, the club golf team competes in the National Collegiate Club Golf Association (NCCGA), the men's rugby team is part of the New England Rugby Football Union (NERFU). Former memberships include the Colonial Hockey Conference (CHC), Commonwealth Coast Football (CCF), Eastern College Athletic Conference (ECAC), the New England Hockey Conference (NEHC), and the Worcester Collegiate Hockey League (WCHL).

Currently, the school offers eleven men's sports: baseball, basketball, cross country, football, golf, ice hockey, lacrosse, soccer, tennis, track and field, and volleyball. There are also ten women's sports: basketball, cross country, field hockey, ice hockey, lacrosse, soccer, softball, tennis, track and field, and volleyball. Coeducational athletics include cheerleading and esports, which competes within the National Association of Collegiate Esports.

Both men's and women's teams have won numerous CCC championships. The men's tennis squad won eight consecutive titles through the 2011–2012 to 2018–2019 seasons, and the women's team has won four titles in 2010–2011, 2016–2017, 2017–2018, and 2018–2019. The men's basketball team claimed three consecutive titles from 2016 to 2017 through 2018–2019, and the men's hockey team was victorious in 2017–2018. Men's soccer has won two titles in 2010 and 2014, and the women won three times, namely in 1996 and 2002. The women's field hockey team also lifted a trophy in 2009. Outside of the CCC, men's hockey has won three ECAC Northeast Championships in 2008–2009, 2013–2014, and 2014–2015, as well as the WCHL Tournament in 1971.

Notable head coaches of the men's football team include: Hal Chalmers (1947–1958), Harry Gaffney (1959–1961), Michael Vendetti (1962–1985), and Jim Crowley (1993–1995).

== Notable people ==
=== Faculty ===
- Jeffrey Hart (English)
- Mauri S. Pelto (environmental science)

=== Alumni ===
==== Academy ====
- Henry Harrison Brown, author
- John R. Thayer, member of the Massachusetts House of Representatives

==== College ====
- Jay Accorsi (1984), college football coach
- Hal Chalmers (1936), college football coach
- Charles Drake (1937), actor
- Kenny Dykstra (2016), professional wrestler
- Fred Friendly (1936), former president of CBS News
- Paul King (1985), National Football League referee
- Joseph Petty, mayor of Worcester
- Bob Sharp (1963), professional racing driver
- Robert Stansky (1978), manager of the Fidelity Magellan Fund
- Sam Walther (2020), professional ice hockey player

== See also ==
- List of colleges and universities in Massachusetts
