= List of college athletic programs in Massachusetts =

This is a list of college athletic programs in the U.S. state of Massachusetts.

== NCAA ==
=== Division I ===
Full NCAA Division I member colleges in Massachusetts.
- FBS Football, - FCS Football, - Non-football

| Team | School | City | Conference | Sport sponsorship | | | | | | | | |
| Team | School | City | Conference | Football | Basketball | | Baseball | Softball | Ice hockey | | Soccer | |
| Team | School | City | Conference | Football | M | W | Baseball | Softball | M | W | M | W |
|---|---|---|---|---|---|---|---|---|---|---|---|---|
| Boston College Eagles | Boston College | Chestnut Hill | ACC | FBS | Yes | Yes | Yes | Yes | Yes (Note: The men's and women's ice hockey teams of Boston College, Boston University, Massachusetts, Merrimack, and Northeastern all compete in Hockey East, as do the UMass Lowell men's and Holy Cross women's teams.) | Yes | Yes | Yes |
| Boston University Terriers | Boston University | Boston | Patriot | No | Yes | Yes | No | Yes | Yes | Yes | Yes | Yes |
| Harvard Crimson | Harvard University | Cambridge | Ivy League | FCS | Yes | Yes | Yes | Yes | Yes (Note: Harvard's ice hockey teams compete in ECAC Hockey.) | Yes | Yes | Yes |
| Holy Cross Crusaders | College of the Holy Cross | Worcester | Patriot | FCS | Yes | Yes | Yes | Yes | Yes (Note: Holy Cross's men's ice hockey team competes in Atlantic Hockey.) | Yes | Yes | Yes |
| UMass Minutemen and Minutewomen (Note: While national media generally use "Massachusetts", the shortened "UMass" is in wide usage, especially in Massachusetts itself.) | University of Massachusetts Amherst | Amherst | Mid-American | FBS | Yes | Yes | Yes | Yes | Yes | No | Yes | Yes |
| Merrimack Warriors | Merrimack College | North Andover | Metro | FCS | Yes | Yes | Yes | Yes | Yes | Yes | Yes | Yes |
| Northeastern Huskies | Northeastern University | Boston | Coastal | No | Yes | Yes | Yes | No | Yes | Yes | Yes | Yes |
| Stonehill Skyhawks | Stonehill College | Easton | NEC | FCS | Yes | Yes | Yes | Yes | Yes | Yes (Note: Stonehill's women's ice hockey team competes in Division I as a member of the New England Women's Hockey Alliance.) | Yes | Yes |
| UMass Lowell River Hawks | University of Massachusetts Lowell | Lowell | America East | No | Yes | Yes | Yes | Yes | Yes | No | Yes | Yes |

=== Division II ===
Full NCAA Division II member colleges in Massachusetts.

| Team | School | City | Conference | Sport sponsorship | | | | | | | | |
| Team | School | City | Conference | Football | Basketball | | Baseball | Softball | Ice hockey | | Soccer | |
| Team | School | City | Conference | Football | M | W | Baseball | Softball | M | W | M | W |
|---|---|---|---|---|---|---|---|---|---|---|---|---|
| American International Yellow Jackets | American International College | Springfield | Northeast-10 | Yes | Yes | Yes | Yes | Yes | Yes | No | Yes | Yes |
| Assumption Greyhounds | Assumption University | Worcester | Northeast-10 | Yes | Yes | Yes | Yes | Yes | Yes | Yes (Note: Assumption women's ice hockey team competes in Division I as member of the New England Women's Hockey Alliance.) | Yes | Yes |
| Bentley Falcons | Bentley University | Waltham | Northeast-10 | Yes | Yes | Yes | Yes | Yes | Yes (Note: Bentley's men's ice hockey team competes in Division I as a member of Atlantic Hockey America.) | No | Yes | Yes |

=== Division III ===
| Team | School | City | Conference | Sport sponsorship | | | | | | | | |
| Team | School | City | Conference | Football | Basketball | | Baseball | Softball | Ice hockey | | Soccer | |
| Team | School | City | Conference | Football | M | W | Baseball | Softball | M | W | M | W |
|---|---|---|---|---|---|---|---|---|---|---|---|---|
| Amherst Mammoths | Amherst College | Amherst | NESCAC | Yes | Yes | Yes | Yes | Yes | Yes | Yes | Yes | Yes |
| Babson Beavers | Babson College | Wellesley | NEWMAC | No | Yes | Yes | Yes | Yes | Yes (Note: Babson's ice hockey team competes in the Little East Conference.) | No | Yes | Yes |
| Brandeis Judges | Brandeis University | Waltham | UAA | No | Yes | Yes | Yes | Yes | No | No | Yes | Yes |
| Bridgewater State Bears | Bridgewater State University | Bridgewater | MASCAC | Yes | Yes | Yes | Yes | Yes | No | No | Yes | Yes |
| Clark Cougars | Clark University | Worcester | NEWMAC | No | Yes | Yes | Yes | Yes | No | No | Yes | Yes |
| Curry Colonels | Curry College | Milton | CNE | Yes | Yes | Yes | Yes | Yes | Yes | Yes | Yes | Yes |
| Dean Bulldogs | Dean College | Franklin | Great Northeast | Yes (Note: Dean's football team competes in the Massachusetts State Collegiate Athletic Conference.) | Yes | Yes | Yes | Yes | No | No | Yes | Yes |
| Elms Blazers | Elms College | Chicopee | Great Northeast | No | Yes | Yes | Yes | Yes | No | No | Yes | Yes |
| Emerson Lions | Emerson College | Boston | NEWMAC | No | Yes | Yes | Yes | Yes | No | No | Yes | Yes |
| Emmanuel Saints | Emmanuel College | Boston | Great Northeast | No | Yes | Yes | No | Yes | No | No | Yes | Yes |
| Endicott Gulls | Endicott College | Beverly | CNE | Yes | Yes | Yes | Yes | Yes | Yes | Yes | Yes | Yes |
| Fitchburg State Falcons | Fitchburg State University | Fitchburg | MASCAC | Yes | Yes | Yes | Yes | Yes | Yes | No | Yes | Yes |
| Framingham State Rams | Framingham State University | Framingham | MASCAC | Yes | Yes | Yes | Yes | Yes | Yes | Yes | Yes | Yes |
| Gordon Fighting Scots | Gordon College | Wenham | CNE | No | Yes | Yes | Yes | Yes | No | No | Yes | Yes |
| Lasell Lasers | Lasell University | Auburndale | Great Northeast | No | Yes | Yes | Yes | Yes | No | No | Yes | Yes |
| Lesley Lynx | Lesley University | Cambridge | North Atlantic | No | Yes | Yes | Yes | Yes | No | No | Yes | Yes |
| MCLA Trailblazers | Massachusetts College of Liberal Arts | North Adams | MASCAC | No | Yes | Yes | Yes | Yes | No | No | Yes | Yes |
| MIT Engineers | Massachusetts Institute of Technology | Cambridge | NEWMAC | Yes | Yes | Yes | Yes | Yes | No | No | Yes | Yes |
| Massachusetts Maritime Buccaneers | Massachusetts Maritime Academy | Buzzards Bay | MASCAC | Yes | No | No | Yes | Yes | No | No | Yes | Yes |
| Mount Holyoke Lyons | Mount Holyoke College | South Hadley | NEWMAC | No | No | Yes | No | No | No | No | No | Yes |
| Nichols Bison | Nichols College | Dudley | CNE | Yes | Yes | Yes | Yes | Yes | Yes | Yes | Yes | Yes |
| Regis Pride | Regis College | Weston | Great Northeast | No | Yes | Yes | No | Yes | No | No | Yes | Yes |
| Salem State Vikings | Salem State University | Salem | MASCAC | No | Yes | Yes | Yes | Yes | Yes | Yes | Yes | Yes |
| Simmons Sharks | Simmons University | Boston | Great Northeast | No | No | No | No | Yes | No | No | No | Yes |
| Smith Bears | Smith College | Northampton | NEWMAC | No | No | Yes | No | Yes | No | No | No | Yes |
| Springfield Pride | Springfield College | Springfield | NEWMAC | Yes | Yes | Yes | Yes | Yes | No | No | Yes | Yes |
| Suffolk Rams | Suffolk University | Boston | CNE | No | Yes | Yes | Yes | Yes | Yes | Yes | Yes | Yes |
| Tufts Jumbos | Tufts University | Medford | NESCAC | Yes | Yes | Yes | Yes | Yes | Yes | No | Yes | Yes |
| UMass Boston Beacons | University of Massachusetts Boston | Boston | Little East | No | Yes | Yes | Yes | Yes | Yes | Yes | Yes | Yes |
| UMass Dartmouth Corsairs | University of Massachusetts Dartmouth | North Dartmouth | Little East | Yes (Note: UMass Dartmouth's football team competes in the Massachusetts State Collegiate Athletic Conference.) | Yes | Yes | Yes | Yes | Yes | No | Yes | Yes |
| Wellesley Blue | Wellesley College | Wellesley | NEWMAC | No | No | Yes | No | Yes | No | No | No | Yes |
| Wentworth Leopards | Wentworth Institute of Technology | Boston | CNE | No | Yes | Yes | Yes | Yes | Yes | No | Yes | Yes |
| Western New England Golden Bears | Western New England University | Springfield | CNE | Yes | Yes | Yes | Yes | Yes | Yes | Yes | Yes | Yes |
| Westfield State Owls | Westfield State University | Westfield | MASCAC | Yes | Yes | Yes | Yes | Yes | Yes | No | Yes | Yes |
| Wheaton Lyons | Wheaton College | Norton | NEWMAC | No | Yes | Yes | Yes | Yes | No | No | Yes | Yes |
| Williams Ephs | Williams College | Williamstown | NESCAC | Yes | Yes | Yes | Yes | Yes | Yes | Yes | Yes | Yes |
| Worcester State Lancers | Worcester State University | Worcester | MASCAC | Yes | Yes | Yes | Yes | Yes | Yes | Yes | Yes | Yes |
| WPI Engineers | Worcester Polytechnic Institute | Worcester | NEWMAC | Yes | Yes | Yes | Yes | Yes | No | No | Yes | Yes |

== NAIA ==
| Team | School | City | Conference | Sport sponsorship | | | | | |
| Team | School | City | Conference | Basketball | | Baseball | Softball | Soccer | |
| Team | School | City | Conference | M | W | Baseball | Softball | M | W |
|---|---|---|---|---|---|---|---|---|---|
| Fisher Falcons | Fisher College | Boston | Independent | Yes | Yes | Yes | Yes | Yes | Yes |

== USCAA ==
| Team | School | City | Conference |
|---|---|---|---|
| Bay Path Wildcats | Bay Path University | Longmeadow | |
| Hampshire Black Sheep | Hampshire College | Amherst | Yankee Small College Conference |

== NJCAA ==
| Team | School | City | Conference |
|---|---|---|---|
| Berkshire Falcons | Berkshire Community College | Pittsfield, Massachusetts | Independent |
| Bristol Bees | Bristol Community College | Fall River | Massachusetts CC |
| Bunker Hill Bulldogs | Bunker Hill Community College | Boston | Massachusetts CC |
| Holyoke Cougars | Holyoke Community College | Holyoke | Massachusetts CC |
| Mass Bay Buccaneers | Massachusetts Bay Community College | Wellesley Hills | Massachusetts CC |
| Massasoit Warriors | Massasoit Community College | Brockton | Massachusetts CC |
| Northern Essex Knights | Northern Essex Community College | Haverhill | Massachusetts CC |
| Quincy Granite | Quincy College | Quincy | Massachusetts CC |
| Quinsigamond Wyverns | Quinsigamond Community College | Worcester | Massachusetts CC |
| Roxbury Tigers | Roxbury Community College | Roxbury Crossing | Massachusetts CC |
| Springfield Tech Rams | Springfield Technical Community College | Springfield | Massachusetts CC |

== Other/None ==
| Team | School | City | Conference |
|---|---|---|---|
| Stockbridge School of Agriculture | Stockbridge School of Agriculture | Amherst | |

^{1}The Stockbridge School of Agriculture, a division of the University of Massachusetts Amherst, has separate athletic programs from UMass in basketball and golf.

== See also ==
- List of NCAA Division I institutions
- List of NCAA Division II institutions
- List of NCAA Division III institutions
- List of NAIA institutions
- List of USCAA institutions
- List of NCCAA institutions
- List of NJCAA Division I institutions
- List of NJCAA Division II institutions
- List of NJCAA Division III institutions
