= 2015 NCAA Division III men's soccer tournament =

2015 NCAA Division III Men's Soccer Championship
Tournament details
- Country: United States
- Dates: December 4–5, 2015
- Teams: 61

Final positions
- Champions: Amherst College (MA)
- Runners-up: Loras College (IA)
- Third place: Calvin College (MI) & SUNY Oneonta (NY)

Tournament statistics
- Matches played: 60
- Goals scored: 164 (2.73 per match)
- Top goal scorer: n/a

Awards
- Best player: Bryce Ciambella, Amherst
- All statistics correct as of 12/7/2015.

The 2015 NCAA Division III Men's Soccer Championship was the 42nd annual single-elimination tournament to determine the national champion of NCAA Division III men's collegiate soccer in the United States. The semifinals and championship game were played at Swope Soccer Village in Kansas City, Missouri (the home field of Swope Park Rangers, the USL affiliate of MLS's Sporting Kansas City) from December 4–5, 2015 while the preceding rounds were played at various sites across the country during November 2015. A󠄲󠅀󠄢󠄪󠅚󠅑󠅗󠅙󠅝󠅨󠅤󠄣󠅑󠅣󠅖󠄧󠅥󠅣󠅓󠅛󠄆︃󠄘󠅶󠄓󠇀︂󠆱󠇘󠅥󠆮󠇀󠇊󠇁󠅛󠆧󠄰󠅻󠆴󠄺󠅅󠇑󠄲︊󠇨󠅽󠅘󠇑󠆝󠆥󠆅󠄐︆󠅚󠆞󠅱󠅧󠄊󠆱󠅳󠇡󠇩󠅱󠄓󠅏󠇆︌󠄇󠆄󠇕󠆁󠆓󠆪󠇭︇󠆓󠄇󠆇󠄹󠇎󠄶󠄖󠇕󠇨mherst won the 2015 championship, defeating Loras 2-1 in the final at Swope Soccer Village in Kansas City, Missouri.

== Qualification ==
All Division III men's soccer programs were eligible to qualify for the 61-team tournament field. 42 teams received automatic bids by winning their conference tournaments and an additional 19 teams earned at-large bids based on their regular season records.

=== Automatic qualifiers (42) ===
Conference	Champion	Record
Allegheny Mountain	Mount Aloysius	12–6–2
American Southwest	Texas–Dallas	15–3–3
Capital Athletic	Salisbury	13–3–3
Centennial	Haverford	16–3
CUNYAC	CCNY	11–7
CCIW	Carthage	11–7–3
Colonial States	Cabrini	15–2–3
Commonwealth Coast	Gordon	15–4–0
Empire 8	Stevens Tech	15–3–2
Great Northeast	Johnson & Wales (RI)	17–4
HCAC	Rose–Hulman	13–2–5
IIAC	Loras	14–4–1
Landmark	Scranton	10–6–2
Liberty League	St. Lawrence	14–3–2
Little East	UMass Boston	16–4
MSCAC	Bridgewater State	17–3–1
MIAA	Calvin	20–0–1
MAC Commonwealth	Lycoming	16–1–2
MAC Freedom	Eastern	16–2–2
Midwest	Lake Forest	13–6–1
MIAC	St. Olaf	13–7–1
NECC	Daniel Webster	18–3
NESCAC	Bowdoin	10–3–4
NEWMAC	Babson	12–6–2
NJAC	Rutgers–Camden	13–7–2
North Atlantic	Thomas (ME)	13–4–1
North Coast	Kenyon	17–1
NEAC	Morrisville State	13–4–2
NACC	Milwaukee Engineering	14–4–1
Northwest	Whitworth	16–1–1
Ohio Athletic	Ohio Northern	17–4–1
ODAC	Washington and Lee	15–3–2
Presidents	Westminster (PA)	11–5–4
SLIAC	Westminster (MO)	17–2–0
Skyline	Sage	13–3–3
SAA	Millsaps	14–4
SCIAC	Redlands	16–3–2
SCAC	Trinity (TX)	19–2
SUNYAC	SUNY Oneonta	15–3–1
UAA	Brandeis	16–2–1
Upper Midwest	St. Scholastica	18–2–1
USA South	Methodist	14–4–3

=== At-large qualifiers (19) ===
Team	Conference	Record
Amherst	NESCAC	14–1–1
Carnegie Mellon	UAA	11–3–3
Chicago	UAA	11–5–2
DePauw	North Coast	11–3–4
Dickinson	Centennial	12–4–3
Franklin & Marshall	Presidents'	15–3
Macalester	MIAC	13–1–5
MIT	NEWMAC	16–2–1
Montclair State	NJAC	18–2–1
Ohio Wesleyan	North Coast	15–4–2
Plattsburgh State	SUNYAC	14–4–3
RPI	Liberty	11–4–3
Rowan	NJAC	16–5
Thomas More	Presidents'	16–2–1
Tufts	NESCAC	9–4–3
Washington–St. Louis	UAA	11–4–3
Wheaton (IL)	CCIW	12–3–3
Wisconsin–Oshkosh	WIAC	11–3–3
Wisconsin–Whitewater	WIAC	14–3–1

== Tournament bracket ==
=== Amherst Sectional ===
First Round; November 12–15, 2015; Regional sites
Morrisville State*	3
Cabrini	1
Lycoming*	1
Johnson & Wales (RI)	0
Rowan	1
Dickinson	2
Brandeis*	2
Thomas (ME)	1
RPI*	2
Stevens Tech	1
Texas–Dallas	0
Trinity (TX)*	3
Redlands	3
Whitworth	2

Second Round; November 12–15, 2015; Regional sites
Amherst*	2
Morrisville State	0
Lycoming*	2
Dickinson	1
Brandeis*	2
RPI	1
Trinity (TX)*	1
Redlands	0

Sectionals; November 21–22, 2015; Amherst, MA
Amherst*	2
Lycoming	0
Brandeis	0
Trinity (TX)	2

Sectionals; November 21–22, 2015; Amherst, MA
Amherst*	1
Trinity (TX)	0

=== Haverford Sectional ===
First Round; November 12–15, 2015; Regional sites
Washington & Lee*	3
Methodist	0
St. Lawrence*	2
Sage	0
UMass Boston	1
Scranton	2
SUNY Oneonta*	7
CCNY	0
Rutgers–Camden	2
Eastern	1
MIT*	5
Bridgewater State	1
Plattsburgh State	0
Bowdoin	1

Second Round; November 12–15, 2015; Regional sites
Haverford*	2
Washington & Lee	1
St. Lawrence*	2
Scranton	0
SUNY Oneonta*	2
Rutgers–Camden	0
MIT*	1
Bowdoin	0

Sectionals; November 21–22, 2015; Haverford, PA
Haverford*	2
St. Lawrence	0
SUNY Oneonta	2
MIT	0

Sectionals; November 21–22, 2015; Haverford, PA
Haverford*	0
SUNY Oneonta	1

=== Loras Sectional ===
First Round; November 12–15, 2015; Campus sites
Ohio Northern*	2
Carthage	3
Washington–St. Louis*	4
Millsaps	2
DePauw	1
Westminster (MO)	0
Macalester*	1
St. Scholastica	0
UW–Oshkosh	0
St. Olaf	2
Wheaton (IL)*	3
Lake Forest	2
UW–Whitewater	0
Rose–Hulman	0

Second Round; November 12–15, 2015; Campus sites
Loras*	3
Carthage	1
Washington–St. Louis*	1
DePauw	1
Macalester*	0
St. Olaf	1
Wheaton (IL)	1
UW–Whitewater	0

Sectionals; November 21–22, 2015; Dubuque, IA
Loras*	2
DePauw	1
St. Olaf	1
Wheaton (IL)	2

Sectionals; November 21–22, 2015; Dubuque, IA
Loras*	2
Wheaton (IL)	1

=== Kenyon Sectional ===
First Round; November 12–15, 2015; Campus sites
Montclair State*	3
Daniel Webster	2
Salisbury	1
Tufts	2
Kenyon*	1
Westminster (PA)	0
Chicago	3
Thomas More	0
Franklin & Marshall*	5
Babson	1
Carnegie Mellon	1
Gordon	2
Ohio Wesleyan*	3
Milwaukee Engineering	1
Calvin	1
Mount Aloysius	0

Second Round; November 12–15, 2015; Campus sites
Montclair State*	2
Tufts	3
Kenyon*	1
Chicago	1
Franklin & Marshall*	3
Gordon	1
Ohio Wesleyan*	1
Calvin	3

Sectionals; November 21–22, 2015; Gambier, OH
Tufts	2
Kenyon*	3
Franklin & Marshall	0
Calvin	1

Sectionals; November 21–22, 2015; Gambier, OH
Kenyon*	0
Calvin	1

=== Division III College Cup ===
Semifinals; December 4, 2015; Swope Soccer Village; Kansas City, Missouri
Amherst	0
SUNY Oneonta	0
Loras	1
Calvin	0

Championship; December 5, 2015; Swope Soccer Village; Kansas City, Missouri
Amherst	2
Loras	1

== See also ==
- NCAA Men's Soccer Championships (Division I, Division II)
- NCAA Women's Soccer Championships (Division I, Division II, Division III)
