= List of NCAA Division III institutions =

There are currently 423 American colleges and universities classified as Division III for NCAA competition, making it the largest division in the NCAA by school count. Schools from 34 of the 50 states and the District of Columbia are represented.

All schools do not provide athletic scholarships to students.

Conference affiliations listed in this table are primary affiliations as of the current 2026–27 school year. Many schools will house some sports in other conferences if their primary leagues do not sponsor a given sport.

== Division III institutions ==
- Reclassifying institutions in yellow. Departing institutions in red.

List of NCAA Division III institutions
School	Nickname	City	State	Enrollment^{(Fall 2023)}	Conference
Adrian College	Bulldogs	Adrian	MI	1,760	Michigan Intercollegiate Athletic Association
Agnes Scott College (Note: Women-only institution in undergraduate programs, therefore it does not compete in men's sports.)	Scotties	Decatur	GA	1,077	Collegiate Conference of the South
Albertus Magnus College	Falcons	New Haven	CT	1,161	Great Northeast Athletic Conference
Albion College	Britons	Albion	MI	1,354	Michigan Intercollegiate Athletic Association
Albright College	Lions	Reading	PA	1,652	MAC Commonwealth
Alfred University	Saxons	Alfred	NY	1,843	Empire 8
Alfred State College	Pioneers	Alfred	NY	3,749	State University of New York Athletic Conference
Allegheny College	Gators	Meadville	PA	1,231	Presidents' Athletic Conference
Alma College	Scots	Alma	MI	1,273	Michigan Intercollegiate Athletic Association
Alvernia University	Golden Wolves	Reading	PA	2,485	MAC Commonwealth
Alverno College	Inferno	Milwaukee	WI	1,719	Coast to Coast Athletic Conference
Amherst College	Mammoths	Amherst	MA	1,910	New England Small College Athletic Conference
Anderson University	Ravens and Lady Ravens	Anderson	IN	1,255	Heartland Collegiate Athletic Conference
Arcadia University	Knights	Glenside	PA	3,142	MAC Freedom
Asbury University	Eagles	Wilmore	KY	1,942	Collegiate Conference of the South
Augsburg University	Auggies	Minneapolis	MN	3,161	Minnesota Intercollegiate Athletic Conference
Augustana College	Vikings	Rock Island	IL	2,484	College Conference of Illinois and Wisconsin
Aurora University	Spartans	Aurora	IL	5,935	Northern Athletics Collegiate Conference
Austin College	Kangaroos	Sherman	TX	1,136	Southern Collegiate Athletic Conference
Averett University	Cougars	Danville	VA	1,378	Old Dominion Athletic Conference
Azusa Pacific University (Note: First-year provisional Division III member.)	Cougars	Azusa	CA	7,120	Southern California Intercollegiate Athletic Conference
Babson College	Beavers	Wellesley	MA	3,943	New England Women's and Men's Athletic Conference
Baldwin Wallace University	Yellow Jackets	Berea	OH	3,308	Ohio Athletic Conference
Bard College	Raptors	Annandale-on-Hudson	NY	2,922	Liberty League
Baruch College	Bearcats	New York (Note: The U.S. Postal Service uses "New York, NY" as an address only for Manhattan. Addresses in the rest of New York City reflect a borough or neighborhood.)	NY	19,698	City University of New York Athletic Conference
Bates College	Bobcats	Lewiston	ME	1,753	New England Small College Athletic Conference
Batten University	Marlins	Virginia Beach	VA	1,711	Old Dominion Athletic Conference
Belhaven University	Blazers	Jackson	MS	3,616	Collegiate Conference of the South
Beloit College	Buccaneers	Beloit	WI	948	Midwest Conference
Benedictine University	Eagles	Lisle	IL	2,989	Northern Athletics Collegiate Conference
Berea College	Mountaineers	Berea	KY	1,487	Heartland Collegiate Athletic Conference
Berry College	Vikings	Mount Berry	GA	2,370	Southern Athletic Association
Bethany College	Bison	Bethany	WV	671	Presidents' Athletic Conference
Bethany Lutheran College	Vikings	Mankato	MN	902	Upper Midwest Athletic Conference
Bethel University	Royals	Arden Hills	MN	3,521	Minnesota Intercollegiate Athletic Conference
Blackburn College	Beavers	Carlinville	IL	389	St. Louis Intercollegiate Athletic Conference
Bluffton University	Beavers	Bluffton	OH	678	Heartland Collegiate Athletic Conference
Bowdoin College	Polar Bears	Brunswick	ME	1,850	New England Small College Athletic Conference
Brandeis University	Judges	Waltham	MA	5,302	University Athletic Association
Brevard College	Tornados	Brevard	NC	787	USA South Athletic Conference
Bridgewater College	Eagles	Bridgewater	VA	1,436	Old Dominion Athletic Conference
Bridgewater State University	Bears	Bridgewater	MA	9,550	Massachusetts State Collegiate Athletic Conference
Brooklyn College	Bulldogs	Brooklyn	NY	13,935	City University of New York Athletic Conference
Bryn Mawr College	Owls	Bryn Mawr	PA	1,666	Centennial Conference
Buena Vista University	Beavers	Storm Lake	IA	1,951	American Rivers Conference
Buffalo State University	Bengals	Buffalo	NY	6,470	State University of New York Athletic Conference
Cairn University	Highlanders	Langhorne	PA	1,056	United East Conference
California Institute of Technology	Beavers	Pasadena	CA	2,463	Southern California Intercollegiate Athletic Conference
California Lutheran University	Kingsmen and Regals	Thousand Oaks	CA	3,413	Southern California Intercollegiate Athletic Conference
University of California, Santa Cruz	Banana Slugs	Santa Cruz	CA	19,764	Coast to Coast Athletic Conference
Calvin University	Knights	Grand Rapids	MI	3,364	Michigan Intercollegiate Athletic Association
Capital University	Comets	Bexley	OH	2,388	Ohio Athletic Conference
Carleton College	Knights	Northfield	MN	2,069	Minnesota Intercollegiate Athletic Conference
Carlow University (Note: Third-year provisional Division III member.)	Celtics	Pittsburgh	PA	2,310	Allegheny Mountain Collegiate Conference
Carnegie Mellon University	Tartans	Pittsburgh	PA	15,596	University Athletic Association
Carroll University	Pioneers	Waukesha	WI	3,176	College Conference of Illinois and Wisconsin
Carthage College	Firebirds	Kenosha	WI	2,771	College Conference of Illinois and Wisconsin
Case Western Reserve University	Spartans	Cleveland	OH	12,266	University Athletic Association
Catholic University of America	Cardinals	Washington	DC	5,171	Landmark Conference
Cedar Crest College	Falcons	Allentown	PA	1,248	United East Conference
Centenary College of Louisiana	Gentlemen and Ladies	Shreveport	LA	648	Southern Collegiate Athletic Conference
Centenary University	Cyclones	Hackettstown	NJ	1,453	Atlantic East Conference (Note: Atlantic East Conference will disband after 2026–27 season, with Centenary (NJ), Gwynedd Mercy, Immaculata and Marymount University joining United East Conference starting in 2027–28, while Pratt and Saint Elizabeth will join City University of New York Athletic Conference also starting in 2027–28.) (United East Conference in 2027)
Central College	Dutch	Pella	IA	1,095	American Rivers Conference
Centre College	Colonels	Danville	KY	1,356	Southern Athletic Association
Chapman University	Panthers	Orange	CA	9,961	Southern California Intercollegiate Athletic Conference
Chatham University	Cougars	Pittsburgh	PA	2,319	Presidents' Athletic Conference
University of Chicago	Maroons	Chicago	IL	18,339	University Athletic Association
Christopher Newport University	Captains	Newport News	VA	4,503	Coast to Coast Athletic Conference
City College of New York	Beavers	New York	NY	15,012	City University of New York Athletic Conference
Claremont McKenna College, Harvey Mudd College, and Scripps College (Note: A combined team of Claremont McKenna College, Harvey Mudd College, and Scripps College branded as Claremont-Mudd-Scripps.)	Stags and Athenas	Claremont	CA	3,436 (Note: Combined enrollment.)	Southern California Intercollegiate Athletic Conference
Clark University	Cougars	Worcester	MA	4,124	New England Women's and Men's Athletic Conference
Clarkson University (Note: Plays men's ice hockey in Division I and is allowed to award scholarships.) (Note: Plays women's ice hockey in Division I and is allowed to award scholarships.)	Golden Knights	Potsdam	NY	3,603	Liberty League
Coe College	Kohawks	Cedar Rapids	IA	1,278	American Rivers Conference
Colby College	Mules	Waterville	ME	2,284	New England Small College Athletic Conference
Colby–Sawyer College	Chargers	New London	NH	950	Great Northeast Athletic Conference
Colorado College (Note: Plays women's soccer in Division I and is allowed to award scholarships.)	Tigers	Colorado Springs	CO	2,173	Southern Collegiate Athletic Conference
Concordia College	Cobbers	Moorhead	MN	1,868	Minnesota Intercollegiate Athletic Conference
Concordia University Chicago	Cougars	River Forest	IL	5,066	Northern Athletics Collegiate Conference
Concordia University Texas	Tornados	Austin	TX	1,614	Southern Collegiate Athletic Conference
Concordia University Wisconsin	Falcons	Mequon	WI	5,063	Northern Athletics Collegiate Conference (College Conference of Illinois and Wisconsin in 2027)
Connecticut College	Camels	New London	CT	1,995	New England Small College Athletic Conference
Cornell College	Rams	Mount Vernon	IA	1,084	Midwest Conference
Covenant College	Scots	Lookout Mountain	GA	928	Collegiate Conference of the South
Crown College	Polars	St. Bonifacius	MN	1,727	Upper Midwest Athletic Conference
Curry College	Colonels	Milton	MA	1,994	Conference of New England
University of Dallas	Crusaders	Irving	TX	2,182	Southern Collegiate Athletic Conference
Dean College	Bulldogs	Franklin	MA	1,151	Great Northeast Athletic Conference
Delaware Valley University	Aggies	Doylestown	PA	2,189	MAC Freedom
Denison University	Big Red	Granville	OH	2,405	North Coast Athletic Conference
DePauw University	Tigers	Greencastle	IN	1,819	North Coast Athletic Conference
DeSales University	Bulldogs	Center Valley	PA	2,919	MAC Freedom
Dickinson College	Red Devils	Carlisle	PA	2,217	Centennial Conference
Dominican University	Stars	River Forest	IL	3,424	Northern Athletics Collegiate Conference
Drew University	Rangers	Madison	NJ	2,226	Landmark Conference
University of Dubuque	Spartans	Dubuque	IA	1,795	American Rivers Conference
Earlham College	Quakers	Richmond	IN	696	Heartland Collegiate Athletic Conference
East Texas Baptist University	Tigers	Marshall	TX	1,833	American Southwest Conference
Eastern Connecticut State University	Warriors	Willimantic	CT	3,979	Little East Conference
Eastern Mennonite University	Royals	Harrisonburg	VA	1,292	Old Dominion Athletic Conference
Eastern University	Eagles	St. Davids	PA	6,981	MAC Commonwealth
Edgewood University	Eagles	Madison	WI	2,001	Northern Athletics Collegiate Conference
Elizabethtown College	Blue Jays	Elizabethtown	PA	2,152	Landmark Conference
Elmhurst University	Bluejays	Elmhurst	IL	3,906	College Conference of Illinois and Wisconsin
Elmira College	Soaring Eagles	Elmira	NY	657	Empire 8
Elms College	Blazers	Chicopee	MA	1,332	Great Northeast Athletic Conference
Emerson College	Lions	Boston	MA	5,670	New England Women's and Men's Athletic Conference
Emmanuel College	Saints	Boston	MA	2,059	Great Northeast Athletic Conference
Emory University	Eagles	Atlanta	GA	15,046	University Athletic Association
Endicott College	Gulls	Beverly	MA	4,254	Conference of New England
Eureka College	Red Devils	Eureka	IL	527	St. Louis Intercollegiate Athletic Conference
Fairleigh Dickinson University, Florham	Devils	Madison/Florham Park	NJ	2,778	MAC Freedom
Farmingdale State College	Rams	Farmingdale	NY	9,541	Skyline Conference
Fitchburg State University	Falcons	Fitchburg	MA	6,296	Massachusetts State Collegiate Athletic Conference
Framingham State University	Rams	Framingham	MA	4,028	Massachusetts State Collegiate Athletic Conference
Franciscan University of Steubenville	Barons	Steubenville	OH	3,750	Presidents' Athletic Conference
Franklin & Marshall College (Note: Competes in Division I in men's wrestling, but is not allowed to award scholarships.)	Diplomats	Lancaster	PA	1,911	Centennial Conference
Franklin College	Grizzlies	Franklin	IN	966	Heartland Collegiate Athletic Conference
Gallaudet University	Bison	Washington	DC	1,364	United East Conference
Geneva College	Golden Tornadoes	Beaver Falls	PA	1,258	Presidents' Athletic Conference
George Fox University	Bruins	Newberg	OR	4,531	Northwest Conference
Gettysburg College	Bullets	Gettysburg	PA	2,895	Centennial Conference
Gordon College	Fighting Scots	Wenham	MA	1,610	Conference of New England
Goucher College	Gophers	Towson	MD	1,500	Landmark Conference
Greensboro College	Pride	Greensboro	NC	898	USA South Athletic Conference
Greenville University	Panthers	Greenville	IL	1,053	St. Louis Intercollegiate Athletic Conference
Grinnell College	Pioneers	Grinnell	IA	1,775	Midwest Conference
Grove City College	Wolverines	Grove City	PA	2,365	Presidents' Athletic Conference
Guilford College	Quakers	Greensboro	NC	1,208	Old Dominion Athletic Conference
Gustavus Adolphus College	Gusties	St. Peter	MN	1,952	Minnesota Intercollegiate Athletic Conference
Gwynedd Mercy University	Griffins	Lower Gwynedd Township	PA	2,165	Atlantic East Conference (United East Conference in 2027)
Hamilton College	Continentals	Clinton	NY	2,048	New England Small College Athletic Conference
Hamline University	Pipers	St. Paul	MN	2,432	Minnesota Intercollegiate Athletic Conference
Hampden–Sydney College (Note: Men's only institution in undergraduate programs, therefore it does not compete in women's sports.)	Tigers	Hampden Sydney	VA	876	Old Dominion Athletic Conference
Hanover College	Panthers	Hanover	IN	1,157	Heartland Collegiate Athletic Conference
Hardin–Simmons University	Cowboys and Cowgirls	Abilene	TX	1,655	American Southwest Conference
University of Hartford	Hawks	West Hartford	CT	5,913	Conference of New England
Hartwick College	Hawks	Oneonta	NY	1,113	Empire 8
Haverford College	Fords	Haverford	PA	1,424	Centennial Conference
Heidelberg University	Student Princes	Tiffin	OH	1,059	Ohio Athletic Conference
Hendrix College	Warriors	Conway	AR	1,107	Southern Collegiate Athletic Conference
Hilbert College	Hawks	Hamburg	NY	973	Allegheny Mountain Collegiate Conference
Hiram College	Terriers	Hiram	OH	1,011	Presidents' Athletic Conference
Hobart College (Note: Fields a Division I men's lacrosse team, but is not allowed to award lacrosse scholarships.) (Note: Hobart (men) and William Smith (women) are together the Colleges of the Seneca and usually grouped together, but they participate separately in athletics.)	Statesmen	Geneva	NY	818	Liberty League
Hollins University	None	Roanoke	VA	821	Old Dominion Athletic Conference
Hood College	Blazers	Frederick	MD	2,078	MAC Commonwealth
Hope College	Flying Dutchmen	Holland	MI	3,368	Michigan Intercollegiate Athletic Association
Houghton University	Highlanders	Houghton	NY	1,014	Empire 8
Howard Payne University	Yellow Jackets	Brownwood	TX	833	American Southwest Conference
Hunter College	Hawks	New York	NY	22,879	City University of New York Athletic Conference
Huntingdon College	Hawks	Montgomery	AL	869	Collegiate Conference of the South
Husson University	Eagles	Bangor	ME	3,133	North Atlantic Conference
Illinois College	Blueboys and Lady Blues	Jacksonville	IL	958	Midwest Conference
Illinois Institute of Technology	Scarlet Hawks	Chicago	IL	8,563	Northern Athletics Collegiate Conference
Illinois Wesleyan University	Titans	Bloomington	IL	1,576	College Conference of Illinois and Wisconsin
Immaculata University	Mighty Macs	Immaculata	PA	2,407	Atlantic East Conference (United East Conference in 2027)
Ithaca College	Bombers	Ithaca	NY	4,828	Liberty League
John Carroll University	Blue Streaks	University Heights	OH	2,773	North Coast Athletic Conference
John Jay College of Criminal Justice	Bloodhounds	New York	NY	13,510	City University of New York Athletic Conference
Johns Hopkins University (Note: Johns Hopkins fields Division I teams in men's and women's lacrosse. Both teams are allowed to award scholarships.)	Blue Jays	Baltimore	MD	30,362	Centennial Conference
Johnson & Wales University	Wildcats	Providence	RI	4,372	Conference of New England
Johnson & Wales University Charlotte (Note: Second-year provisional Division III member.)	Wildcats	Charlotte	NC	1,128	Coast to Coast Athletic Conference
Juniata College	Eagles	Huntingdon	PA	1,292	Landmark Conference
Kalamazoo College	Hornets	Kalamazoo	MI	1,196	Michigan Intercollegiate Athletic Association
Kean University	Cougars	Union Township	NJ	13,352	New Jersey Athletic Conference
Keene State College	Owls	Keene	NH	2,846	Little East Conference
Kenyon College	Owls	Gambier	OH	2,184	North Coast Athletic Conference
Keuka College	Wolves	Keuka Park	NY	1,284	Empire 8 (Allegheny Mountain Collegiate Conference in 2027)
Keystone College	Giants	La Plume Township	PA	1,051	United East Conference
King's College	Monarchs	Wilkes-Barre	PA	1,932	MAC Freedom
Knox College	Prairie Fire	Galesburg	IL	1,001	Midwest Conference
La Roche University	Redhawks	Pittsburgh (Note: The campus has a Pittsburgh mailing address but is located in McCandless.)	PA	2,618	Allegheny Mountain Collegiate Conference
University of La Verne	Leopards	La Verne	CA	5,596	Southern California Intercollegiate Athletic Conference
LaGrange College	Panthers	LaGrange	GA	671	Collegiate Conference of the South
Lake Forest College	Foresters	Lake Forest	IL	1,818	Midwest Conference
Lakeland University	Muskies	Sheboygan	WI	2,786	Northern Athletics Collegiate Conference
Lancaster Bible College	Chargers	Lancaster	PA	2,455	United East Conference
Lasell University	Lasers	Newton	MA	1,527	Great Northeast Athletic Conference
Lawrence University	Vikings	Appleton	WI	1,410	Midwest Conference
Lebanon Valley College	Flying Dutchmen	Annville	PA	2,142	MAC Freedom
Lehman College	Lightning	Bronx	NY	12,894	City University of New York Athletic Conference
Lesley University	Lynx	Boston	MA	3,134	North Atlantic Conference
LeTourneau University	Yellow Jackets	Longview	TX	3,389	Southern Collegiate Athletic Conference
Lewis & Clark College	River Otters	Portland	OR	3,526	Northwest Conference
Linfield University	Wildcats	McMinnville	OR	1,726	Northwest Conference
Loras College	Duhawks	Dubuque	IA	1,213	American Rivers Conference
Luther College	Norse	Decorah	IA	1,463	Midwest Conference
Lycoming College	Warriors	Williamsport	PA	1,063	Landmark Conference
University of Lynchburg	Hornets	Lynchburg	VA	2,592	Old Dominion Athletic Conference
Lyon College	Scots	Batesville	AR	584	St. Louis Intercollegiate Athletic Conference
Macalester College	Scots	St. Paul	MN	2,142	Minnesota Intercollegiate Athletic Conference
University of Maine at Farmington	Beavers	Farmington	ME	1,950	North Atlantic Conference
Maine Maritime Academy	Mariners	Castine	ME	913	North Atlantic Conference
University of Maine at Presque Isle	Owls	Presque Isle	ME	2,187	North Atlantic Conference
Manchester University (Note: Manchester will transition to the NAIA after the 2026–27 academic year, joining the Crossroads League.)	Spartans	North Manchester	IN	1,175	Heartland Collegiate Athletic Conference
Manhattanville University	Valiants	Purchase	NY	2,379	Skyline Conference
Maranatha Baptist University	Sabercats	Watertown	WI	977	Independent
Marian University	Sabres	Fond du Lac	WI	1,319	Northern Athletics Collegiate Conference
Marietta College	Pioneers	Marietta	OH	1,171	Ohio Athletic Conference
Martin Luther College	Knights	New Ulm	MN	860	Upper Midwest Athletic Conference
Mary Baldwin University	Fighting Squirrels	Staunton	VA	1,792	USA South Athletic Conference
University of Mary Hardin–Baylor	Crusaders	Belton	TX	3,520	American Southwest Conference
University of Mary Washington	Eagles	Fredericksburg	VA	3,808	Coast to Coast Athletic Conference
Marymount University	Saints	Arlington	VA	3,667	Atlantic East Conference (United East Conference in 2027)
Maryville College	Scots	Maryville	TN	1,147	Southern Athletic Association (Collegiate Conference of the South in 2027)
Marywood University	Pacers	Scranton	PA	2,850	MAC Freedom
University of Massachusetts Boston	Beacons	Boston	MA	15,810	Little East Conference
Massachusetts College of Liberal Arts	Trailblazers	North Adams	MA	933	Massachusetts State Collegiate Athletic Conference
University of Massachusetts Dartmouth	Corsairs	Dartmouth	MA	7,759	Little East Conference
Massachusetts Institute of Technology (Note: Competes in Division I in women's rowing, but is not allowed to award scholarships.)	Engineers	Cambridge	MA	11,920	New England Women's and Men's Athletic Conference
Massachusetts Maritime Academy (Note: Non-basketball member.)	Buccaneers	Buzzards Bay	MA	1,362	Massachusetts State Collegiate Athletic Conference
McDaniel College	Green Terror	Westminster	MD	2,882	Centennial Conference
McMurry University	War Hawks	Abilene	TX	2,549	American Southwest Conference
Medgar Evers College	Cougars	Brooklyn	NY	3,846	City University of New York Athletic Conference
Meredith College	Angels	Raleigh	NC	1,576	USA South Athletic Conference
Messiah University	Falcons	Grantham	PA	3,344	MAC Commonwealth
Methodist University	Monarchs	Fayetteville	NC	1,768	USA South Athletic Conference
Middlebury College	Panthers	Middlebury	VT	2,857	New England Small College Athletic Conference
Millikin University	Big Blue	Decatur	IL	1,659	College Conference of Illinois and Wisconsin
Millsaps College	Majors and Lady Majors	Jackson	MS	626	Southern Athletic Association (Southern Collegiate Athletic Conference in 2027)
Milwaukee School of Engineering	Raiders	Milwaukee	WI	2,834	Northern Athletics Collegiate Conference
University of Minnesota Morris	Cougars	Morris	MN	1,020	Upper Midwest Athletic Conference
Misericordia University	Cougars	Dallas	PA	2,107	MAC Freedom
Mississippi University for Women	Owls	Columbus	MS	2,227	St. Louis Intercollegiate Athletic Conference
Mitchell College	Mariners	New London	CT	500	Great Northeast Athletic Conference
Monmouth College	Scots	Monmouth	IL	727	Midwest Conference
Montclair State University	Red Hawks	Montclair	NJ	22,570	New Jersey Athletic Conference
Moravian University	Greyhounds	Bethlehem	PA	2,658	Landmark Conference
Mount Aloysius College	Mounties	Cresson	PA	2,967	Allegheny Mountain Collegiate Conference
Mount Holyoke College	Lyons	South Hadley	MA	2,330	New England Women's and Men's Athletic Conference
Mount St. Joseph University	Lions	Cincinnati (Note: The campus has a Cincinnati mailing address but is in Delhi Township.)	OH	2,083	Heartland Collegiate Athletic Conference
Mount Saint Mary College	Knights	Newburgh	NY	2,246	Skyline Conference
University of Mount Saint Vincent	Dolphins	Bronx	NY	3,202	Skyline Conference
University of Mount Union	Purple Raiders	Alliance	OH	2,169	Ohio Athletic Conference
Muhlenberg College	Mules	Allentown	PA	1,818	Centennial Conference
Muskingum University	Fighting Muskies	New Concord	OH	2,108	Ohio Athletic Conference
Nazareth University	Golden Flyers	Pittsford	NY	2,439	Empire 8
Nebraska Wesleyan University	Prairie Wolves	Lincoln	NE	1,690	American Rivers Conference
Neumann University	Knights	Aston	PA	2,171	MAC Commonwealth
New England College	Pilgrims	Henniker	NH	2,856	Great Northeast Athletic Conference
University of New England	Nor'easters	Biddeford	ME	6,473	Conference of New England
The College of New Jersey	Lions	Ewing	NJ	7,652	New Jersey Athletic Conference
State University of New York at Brockport	Golden Eagles	Brockport	NY	6,931	Empire 8
State University of New York at Canton	Kangaroos	Canton	NY	2,919	State University of New York Athletic Conference
State University of New York at Cobleskill	Fighting Tigers	Cobleskill	NY	1,792	State University of New York Athletic Conference
State University of New York at Cortland	Red Dragons	Cortland	NY	6,780	State University of New York Athletic Conference
State University of New York at Delhi	Broncos	Delhi	NY	2,777	State University of New York Athletic Conference
State University of New York at Fredonia	Blue Devils	Fredonia	NY	3,220	State University of New York Athletic Conference
State University of New York at Geneseo	Knights	Geneseo	NY	3,928	Empire 8
State University of New York Maritime College	Privateers	The Bronx	NY	1,350	Skyline Conference
State University of New York at Morrisville	Mustangs	Morrisville	NY	2,040	State University of New York Athletic Conference
State University of New York Polytechnic Institute	Wildcats	Marcy	NY	2,704	Empire 8
State University of New York at New Paltz	Hawks	New Paltz	NY	7,420	New Jersey Athletic Conference
State University of New York at Old Westbury	Panthers	Old Westbury	NY	4,449	Skyline Conference
State University of New York at Oneonta	Red Dragons	Oneonta	NY	5,514	State University of New York Athletic Conference
State University of New York at Oswego	Lakers	Oswego	NY	6,756	State University of New York Athletic Conference
State University of New York at Plattsburgh	Cardinals	Plattsburgh	NY	4,417	State University of New York Athletic Conference
State University of New York at Potsdam	Bears	Potsdam	NY	2,751	State University of New York Athletic Conference
State University of New York at Purchase	Panthers	Purchase	NY	3,229	Skyline Conference
New York University	Violets	New York	NY	57,335	University Athletic Association
Nichols College	Bison	Dudley	MA	1,354	Conference of New England
North Carolina Wesleyan University	Bishops	Rocky Mount	NC	1,345	USA South Athletic Conference
North Central College	Cardinals	Naperville	IL	2,856	College Conference of Illinois and Wisconsin
North Central University	Rams	Minneapolis	MN	984	Upper Midwest Athletic Conference
North Park University	Vikings	Chicago	IL	2,624	College Conference of Illinois and Wisconsin
University of Northwestern - St. Paul	Eagles	Roseville	MN	3,262	Upper Midwest Athletic Conference
Norwich University	Cadets	Northfield	VT	3,274	Great Northeast Athletic Conference
Notre Dame of Maryland University	Gators	Baltimore	MD	1,836	United East Conference
Oberlin College	Yeomen and Yeowomen	Oberlin	OH	2,976	North Coast Athletic Conference
Occidental College	Tigers	Los Angeles	CA	1,854	Southern California Intercollegiate Athletic Conference
Oglethorpe University	Stormy Petrels	Atlanta	GA	1,522	Southern Athletic Association
Ohio Northern University	Polar Bears	Ada	OH	3,042	Ohio Athletic Conference
Ohio Wesleyan University	Battling Bishops	Delaware	OH	1,452	North Coast Athletic Conference
University of Olivet	Comets	Olivet	MI	973	Michigan Intercollegiate Athletic Association
Otterbein University	Cardinals	Westerville	OH	2,357	Ohio Athletic Conference
University of the Ozarks	Eagles	Clarksville	AR	763	Southern Collegiate Athletic Conference
Pacific Lutheran University	Lutes	Tacoma	WA	2,737	Northwest Conference
Pacific University	Boxers	Forest Grove	OR	3,479	Northwest Conference
Pennsylvania College of Technology	Wildcats	Williamsport	PA	4,307	United East Conference
Pennsylvania State University, Abington	Nittany Lions	Abington	PA	3,095	United East Conference
Pennsylvania State University, Altoona	Lions	Altoona (Note: The campus has an Altoona mailing address but is in Logan Township.)	PA	2,421	Allegheny Mountain Collegiate Conference
Pennsylvania State University, Berks College	Nittany Lions	Reading	PA	1,944	United East Conference
Pennsylvania State University, Behrend	Lions	Erie	PA	3,323	Allegheny Mountain Collegiate Conference
Pennsylvania State University, Brandywine	Lions	Media	PA	1,223	United East Conference
Pennsylvania State University, Harrisburg	Lions	Harrisburg	PA	4,651	United East Conference
Pfeiffer University	Falcons	Misenheimer	NC	954	USA South Athletic Conference
Piedmont University	Lions	Demorest	GA	1,840	Collegiate Conference of the South
University of Pittsburgh at Bradford	Panthers	Bradford	PA	1,003	Allegheny Mountain Collegiate Conference
University of Pittsburgh at Greensburg	Bobcats	Greensburg	PA	1,326	Allegheny Mountain Collegiate Conference
Plymouth State University	Panthers	Plymouth	NH	3,839	Little East Conference
Pomona College and Pitzer College (Note: A combined team of Pomona College and Pitzer College branded as Pomona-Pitzer.)	Sagehens	Claremont	CA	2,868	Southern California Intercollegiate Athletic Conference
Pratt Institute	Cannoneers	Brooklyn	NY	5,232	Atlantic East Conference (City University of New York Athletic Conference in 2027)
Principia College	Panthers	Elsah	IL	338	St. Louis Intercollegiate Athletic Conference
University of Puget Sound	Loggers	Tacoma	WA	1,914	Northwest Conference
Ramapo College	Roadrunners	Mahwah	NJ	5,521	New Jersey Athletic Conference
Randolph College	WildCats	Lynchburg	VA	634	Old Dominion Athletic Conference
Randolph–Macon College	Yellow Jackets	Ashland	VA	1,523	Old Dominion Athletic Conference
University of Redlands	Bulldogs	Redlands	CA	3,192	Southern California Intercollegiate Athletic Conference
Regent University	Royals	Virginia Beach	VA	10,168	Coast to Coast Athletic Conference
Regis College	Pride	Weston	MA	2,842	Great Northeast Athletic Conference
Rensselaer Polytechnic Institute	Engineers	Troy	NY	7,024	Liberty League
Rhode Island College	Anchormen	Providence	RI	5,767	Little East Conference
Rhodes College	Lynx	Memphis	TN	1,952	Southern Athletic Association
Ripon College	Red Hawks	Ripon	WI	734	Midwest Conference
Rivier University	Raiders	Nashua	NH	2,879	Great Northeast Athletic Conference
Roanoke College	Maroons	Salem	VA	1,835	Old Dominion Athletic Conference
University of Rochester	Yellowjackets	Rochester	NY	12,160	University Athletic Association
Rochester Institute of Technology (Note: Plays men's ice hockey in Division I, but is not allowed to award scholarships.) (Note: Plays women's ice hockey in Division I, but is not allowed to award scholarships.)	Tigers	Rochester	NY	16,863	Liberty League
Rockford University	Regents	Rockford	IL	1,249	Northern Athletics Collegiate Conference
Roger Williams University	Hawks	Bristol	RI	4,344	Conference of New England
Rose-Hulman Institute of Technology	Fightin' Engineers	Terre Haute	IN	2,250	Heartland Collegiate Athletic Conference
Rowan University	Profs	Glassboro	NJ	19,660	New Jersey Athletic Conference
Rutgers University–Camden	Scarlet Raptors	Camden	NJ	5,776	New Jersey Athletic Conference
Rutgers University–Newark	Scarlet Raiders	Newark	NJ	10,809	New Jersey Athletic Conference
Russell Sage College	Gators	Albany & Troy	NY	2,064	Empire 8
College of Saint Benedict (Note: Saint Benedict (women's) and Saint John's (men's) are together the College of Saint Benedict and Saint John's University and usually grouped together, but they participate separately in athletics.)	Bennies	St. Joseph	MN	1,451	Minnesota Intercollegiate Athletic Conference
St. Catherine University	Wildcats	St. Paul	MN	3,533	Minnesota Intercollegiate Athletic Conference
Saint Elizabeth University	Screaming Eagles	Convent Station	NJ	1,009	Atlantic East Conference (City University of New York Athletic Conference in 2027)
Saint Francis University	Red Wolves	Loretto	PA	1,958	Presidents' Athletic Conference
St. John Fisher University	Cardinals	Pittsford	NY	3,674	Empire 8
Saint John's University	Johnnies	Collegeville	MN	1,624	Minnesota Intercollegiate Athletic Conference
University of Saint Joseph	Blue Jays	West Hartford	CT	1,939	Great Northeast Athletic Conference
St. Joseph's University	Bears	Brooklyn	NY	980	Skyline Conference
St. Joseph's University	Golden Eagles	Long Island (Note: The campus mailing address is Patchogue.)	NY	2,568	Skyline Conference
Saint Joseph's College of Maine	Monks	Standish	ME	1,463	Great Northeast Athletic Conference
St. Lawrence University	Saints	Canton	NY	2,089	Liberty League
Saint Mary's College	Belles	Notre Dame	IN	1,518	Michigan Intercollegiate Athletic Association
St. Mary's College of Maryland	Seahawks	St. Mary's City	MD	1,587	United East Conference
Saint Mary's University of Minnesota	Cardinals	Winona	MN	3,831	Minnesota Intercollegiate Athletic Conference
St. Norbert College	Green Knights	De Pere	WI	2,165	Northern Athletics Collegiate Conference
St. Olaf College	Oles	Northfield	MN	3,074	Minnesota Intercollegiate Athletic Conference
The College of St. Scholastica	Saints	Duluth	MN	2,979	Minnesota Intercollegiate Athletic Conference
University of St. Thomas (Texas)	Celts	Houston	TX	3,813	Southern Collegiate Athletic Conference
Saint Vincent College	Bearcats	Latrobe	PA	1,442	Presidents' Athletic Conference
Salem College	Spirits	Winston-Salem	NC	519	USA South Athletic Conference
Salem State University	Vikings	Salem	MA	6,239	Massachusetts State Collegiate Athletic Conference
Salisbury University	Sea Gulls	Salisbury	MD	7,030	Coast to Coast Athletic Conference
Salve Regina University	Seahawks	Newport	RI	2,836	New England Women's and Men's Athletic Conference
Sarah Lawrence College	Gryphons	Yonkers	NY	1,743	Skyline Conference
Schreiner University	Mountaineers	Kerrville	TX	1,208	American Southwest Conference
University of Scranton	Royals	Scranton	PA	4,825	Landmark Conference
University of the South (Note: While formally named The University of the South, the athletic program is branded by the school's alternate name of Sewanee.)	Tigers	Sewanee	TN	1,693	Southern Athletic Association
Shenandoah University	Hornets	Winchester	VA	4,343	Old Dominion Athletic Conference
Simmons University	Sharks	Boston	MA	5,053	Great Northeast Athletic Conference
Simpson College	Storm	Indianola	IA	1,163	American Rivers Conference
Skidmore College	Thoroughbreds	Saratoga Springs	NY	2,776	Liberty League
Smith College	Bears	Northampton	MA	2,830	New England Women's and Men's Athletic Conference
University of Southern Maine	Huskies	Portland	ME	7,528	Little East Conference
Southern Virginia University	Knights	Buena Vista	VA	967	USA South Athletic Conference
Southwestern University	Pirates	Georgetown	TX	1,457	Southern Athletic Association (Southern Collegiate Athletic Conference in 2027)
Spalding University	Golden Eagles	Louisville	KY	1,555	St. Louis Intercollegiate Athletic Conference
Springfield College	Pride	Springfield	MA	2,785	New England Women's and Men's Athletic Conference
Stevens Institute of Technology	Ducks	Hoboken	NJ	8,842	MAC Freedom
Stevenson University	Mustangs	Stevenson	MD	3,507	MAC Commonwealth
Stockton University	Ospreys	Pomona	NJ	8,788	New Jersey Athletic Conference
Suffolk University	Rams	Boston	MA	6,697	Conference of New England
Susquehanna University	River Hawks	Selinsgrove	PA	2,247	Landmark Conference
Swarthmore College	Garnet	Swarthmore	PA	1,644	Centennial Conference
Sweet Briar College	Vixens	Sweet Briar	VA	464	Old Dominion Athletic Conference
Texas Lutheran University	Bulldogs	Seguin	TX	1,361	Southern Collegiate Athletic Conference
Thiel College	Tomcats	Greenville	PA	920	Presidents' Athletic Conference
Thomas College	Terriers	Waterville	ME	1,669	North Atlantic Conference
Transylvania University	Pioneers	Lexington	KY	1,022	Heartland Collegiate Athletic Conference
Trine University	Thunder	Angola	IN	4,471	Michigan Intercollegiate Athletic Association
Trinity College	Bantams	Hartford	CT	2,276	New England Small College Athletic Conference
Trinity University	Tigers	San Antonio	TX	2,694	Southern Athletic Association
Tufts University	Jumbos	Medford	MA	13,274	New England Small College Athletic Conference
Union College	Garnet Chargers	Schenectady	NY	2,082	Liberty League
United States Coast Guard Academy	Bears	New London	CT	1,081	New England Women's and Men's Athletic Conference
United States Merchant Marine Academy	Mariners	Kings Point	NY	961	Skyline Conference
Ursinus College	Bears	Collegeville	PA	1,492	Centennial Conference
Utica University	Pioneers	Utica	NY	3,733	Empire 8
Vassar College	Brewers	Poughkeepsie	NY	2,456	Liberty League
Vermont State University–Castleton	Spartans	Castleton	VT	2,210	Little East Conference (Massachusetts State Collegiate Athletic Conference in 2027)
Vermont State University–Johnson	Badgers	Johnson	VT	650	North Atlantic Conference
Vermont State University–Lyndon	Hornets	Lyndonville	VT	871	North Atlantic Conference
Wabash College	Little Giants	Crawfordsville	IN	845	North Coast Athletic Conference
Warren Wilson College	Owls	Swannanoa	NC	797	Coast to Coast Athletic Conference
Wartburg College	Knights	Waverly	IA	1,472	American Rivers Conference
Washington & Jefferson College	Presidents	Washington	PA	1,162	Presidents' Athletic Conference
Washington and Lee University	Generals	Lexington	VA	2,277	Old Dominion Athletic Conference
Washington College	Shoremen	Chestertown	MD	916	Centennial Conference
Washington University in St. Louis	Bears	St. Louis (Note: The university has a St. Louis mailing address, but the bulk of the main campus, including all athletic facilities, is in unincorporated St. Louis County.)	MO	16,500	University Athletic Association
Waynesburg University	Yellow Jackets	Waynesburg	PA	1,315	Presidents' Athletic Conference
Webster University	Gorloks	St. Louis	MO	7,606	St. Louis Intercollegiate Athletic Conference
Wellesley College	Blue	Wellesley	MA	2,418	New England Women's and Men's Athletic Conference
Wentworth Institute of Technology	Leopards	Boston	MA	4,018	Conference of New England
Wesleyan University	Cardinals	Middletown	CT	3,271	New England Small College Athletic Conference
Western Connecticut State University	Wolves	Danbury	CT	4,137	Little East Conference
Western New England University	Golden Bears	Springfield	MA	3,574	Conference of New England
Westfield State University	Owls	Westfield	MA	4,555	Massachusetts State Collegiate Athletic Conference
Westminster College	Blue Jays	Fulton	MO	593	St. Louis Intercollegiate Athletic Conference
Westminster College	Titans	New Wilmington	PA	1,203	Presidents' Athletic Conference
Wheaton College	Thunder	Wheaton	IL	2,799	College Conference of Illinois and Wisconsin
Wheaton College	Lyons	Norton	MA	1,778	New England Women's and Men's Athletic Conference
Whitman College	Blues	Walla Walla	WA	1,544	Northwest Conference
Whittier College	Poets	Whittier	CA	859	Southern California Intercollegiate Athletic Conference
Whitworth University	Pirates	Spokane	WA	2,345	Northwest Conference
Widener University	Pride	Chester	PA	5,610	MAC Commonwealth
Wilkes University	Colonels	Wilkes-Barre	PA	5,198	Landmark Conference
Willamette University	Bearcats	Salem	OR	2,112	Northwest Conference
William Paterson University	Pioneers	Wayne	NJ	9,426	New Jersey Athletic Conference
William Peace University	Pacers	Raleigh	NC	730	USA South Athletic Conference
William Smith College	Herons	Geneva	NY	851	Liberty League
Williams College	Ephs	Williamstown	MA	2,168	New England Small College Athletic Conference
Wilmington College	Quakers	Wilmington	OH	964	Ohio Athletic Conference
Wilson College	Phoenix	Chambersburg	PA	1,694	United East Conference
University of Wisconsin–Eau Claire	Blugolds	Eau Claire	WI	9,991	Wisconsin Intercollegiate Athletic Conference
University of Wisconsin–La Crosse	Eagles	La Crosse	WI	10,299	Wisconsin Intercollegiate Athletic Conference
Wisconsin Lutheran College	Warriors	Milwaukee	WI	1,094	Northern Athletics Collegiate Conference
University of Wisconsin–Oshkosh	Titans	Oshkosh	WI	13,761	Wisconsin Intercollegiate Athletic Conference
University of Wisconsin–Platteville	Pioneers	Platteville	WI	6,696	Wisconsin Intercollegiate Athletic Conference
University of Wisconsin–River Falls	Falcons	River Falls	WI	5,064	Wisconsin Intercollegiate Athletic Conference
University of Wisconsin–Stevens Point	Pointers	Stevens Point	WI	8,109	Wisconsin Intercollegiate Athletic Conference
University of Wisconsin–Stout Polytechnic	Blue Devils	Menomonie	WI	6,951	Wisconsin Intercollegiate Athletic Conference
University of Wisconsin–Superior	Yellow Jackets	Superior	WI	2,726	Upper Midwest Athletic Conference
University of Wisconsin–Whitewater	Warhawks	Whitewater	WI	11,519	Wisconsin Intercollegiate Athletic Conference
Wittenberg University	Tigers	Springfield	OH	1,333	North Coast Athletic Conference
College of Wooster	Fighting Scots	Wooster	OH	1,876	North Coast Athletic Conference
Worcester Polytechnic Institute	Engineers	Worcester	MA	7,353	New England Women's and Men's Athletic Conference
Worcester State University	Lancers	Worcester	MA	5,611	Massachusetts State Collegiate Athletic Conference
Yeshiva University	Maccabees	New York	NY	6,826	Skyline Conference
York College, City University of New York	Cardinals	Queens	NY	6,161	City University of New York Athletic Conference
York College of Pennsylvania	Spartans	York	PA	3,720	MAC Commonwealth

== Pending ==
These schools are actively pursuing Division III membership, pending NCAA approval.

School	Nickname	City	State/ province	Enrollment^{(Fall 2024)}	Conference	Current affiliation	Latest attempt
Saint Anselm College	Hawks	Goffstown	NH	2,111	New England Women's and Men's Athletic Conference (2027–28)	Northeast-10 Conference (NCAA Division II)	April 2026

== Exploratory ==
This school is actively exploring Division III membership and was granted the exploratory membership for one year.

School	Nickname	City	State/ province	Current affiliation	Latest attempt
University of Maine at Augusta	Moose	Augusta	ME	Yankee Small College Conference (USCAA)	February 2026

== See also ==
- List of NCAA Division I institutions
- List of NCAA Division II institutions
- List of NCAA Division III football programs
- List of NCAA Division III ice hockey programs
- List of NAIA institutions
- List of USCAA institutions
- List of NCCAA institutions
- List of NJCAA Division I schools
- List of NJCAA Division II schools
- List of NJCAA Division III schools
