= Higher Education Consortium of Central Massachusetts =

- Abbreviation: HECCMA
- Predecessor: Colleges of Worcester Consortium (COWC)
- Type: Nonprofit
- Legal status: Association
- Purpose: Education
- Headquarters: 11 Norwich Street
- Location: Worcester, Massachusetts, United States
- Coordinates: 42.264120°N 71.800540°W
- Region served: Central Massachusetts
- Members: 11
- Executive Director: Jeanine Belcastro Went
- Board of directors: Luis G. Pedraja (President)
- Revenue: $11,082 (2020-2021)
- Expenses: $167,120 (2020-2021)
- Staff: 1 (2020-2021)
- Website: www.heccma.org

The Higher Education Consortium of Central Massachusetts (HECCMA) is a nonprofit association of eleven public and private colleges and universities located in Central Massachusetts. The Consortium allows full-time students at any of the member colleges or universities to cross-register for one class per semester at other Consortium schools for no additional tuition.

== History ==
The Higher Education Consortium of Central Massachusetts, based in Worcester, Massachusetts, works to "...collaboratively to further the missions of member institutions." Before 2013, the association was known as the Colleges of Worcester Consortium (COWC).

The current President of the Board is Luis G. Pedraja, who is also President of Quinsigamond Community College.

== Members ==
The Higher Education Consortium of Central Massachusetts consists of the following schools:

- Assumption University
- Clark University
- College of the Holy Cross
- Cummings School of Veterinary Medicine, Tufts University
- Massachusetts College of Pharmacy and Health Sciences
- Nichols College
- Quinsigamond Community College
- University of Massachusetts Chan Medical School
- Worcester Polytechnic Institute
- Worcester State University

Former members include:

- Atlantic Union College
- Becker College
- Anna Maria College

== See also ==
- List of colleges and universities in Massachusetts
