= Pilgrim Lacrosse League =

- Conference: NCAA
- Founded: 2003; 23 years ago
- Folded: 2013; 13 years ago
- Commissioner: Craig Poisson
- Sports fielded: 1 (men's lacrosse)
- Division: Division III
- No. of teams: 7
- Headquarters: Springfield, Massachusetts
- Region: New England
- Website: http://www.pilgrimleague.org

The Pilgrim Lacrosse League was an NCAA Division III men's college lacrosse conference that had member schools in Massachusetts. League operations were absorbed by the New England Women's and Men's Athletic Conference (NEWMAC) for the 2014 spring season and the league is now officially known as the NEWMAC Lacrosse League.

== Member schools ==
=== Final members ===
- Babson College
- Clark University
- Massachusetts Institute of Technology
- Massachusetts Maritime Academy
- Regis College
- Springfield College
- Wheaton College

=== Former members ===
- Eastern Connecticut State University
- Lasell College
- Maine Maritime Academy
- Norwich University
- Plymouth State University
- University of Massachusetts Dartmouth
- Western New England University
