= MASCAC =

MASCAC may refer to:

- Massachusetts State Collegiate Athletic Conference, an athletic conference located within the state of Massachusetts.
- Middle Atlantic States Collegiate Athletic Corporation, an umbrella organization of athletic conferences located within the Mid-Atlantic United States currently known as the Middle Atlantic Conferences
