= Quinsigamond Community College =

Public college in Worcester, Massachusetts, US

Coordinates: 42°18′53.29″N 71°47′37.07″W

- Logo of Quinsigamond Community College.
- Type: Public community college
- Established: 1963
- Accreditation: NECHE
- Academic affiliations: Higher Education Consortium of Central Massachusetts
- Endowment: $4.6 million (2022)
- President: Luis G. Pedraja
- Students: 7,368 (2022)
- Location: Worcester, Massachusetts, United States
- Colors: White and blue
- Nicknames: Wyverns (male); Lady Wyverns (female)
- Mascot: Wyvern
- Website: www.qcc.edu

Quinsigamond Community College (/ˌkwɪnˈsɪɡəmʌnd/)(colloq: QCC, Quinsig) is a public community college in Worcester, Massachusetts. It has an enrollment of over 7,000 students. Many students are enrolled in the college's transfer program, MassTransfer, with the intent of continuing on to a college or university in the state.

== Audits and legal matters ==
In March 2020, the Massachusetts Office of the State Auditor released a performance audit of Quinsigamond Community College covering the period from July 2017 through March 2019. The audit found that QCC did not ensure that all students enrolled in its early childhood education courses had undergone required background checks. Auditors could not verify that 44 of 259 students had received required Criminal Offender Record Information (CORI) and Sex Offender Registry Information (SORI) checks. The audit also found that 17 students participating in capstone courses had not received required fingerprint-based background checks before beginning the courses. QCC agreed with the finding and stated that it was implementing changes to its procedures.

In April 2025, the Massachusetts Office of the State Auditor released another performance audit of QCC, primarily covering activities between March 2020 and June 2023, with its examination of employee settlement agreements extending from January 2019 through December 2023. The audit identified deficiencies involving information-system controls and the college's administration of employee settlement agreements.

The 2025 audit found that QCC did not have a documented, transparent, or accountable process governing employee settlement agreements, including agreements containing nondisclosure, non-disparagement, or similar restrictive provisions. Auditors identified 20 employee settlement agreements during the period reviewed and recommended that QCC develop and implement a formal policy governing such agreements and track complaints associated with agreements containing restrictive clauses.

== History ==
Founded in 1963, QCC occupies a campus within the Greendale neighborhood of Worcester, which was formerly owned by the Assumption Preparatory School until it was destroyed by an F4 tornado in 1953. The college maintains twelve satellite campuses in locations such as nearby Marlborough and Southbridge.

QCC offers day, evening, and online classes, which include over sixty associate degree programs and over fifty certificate programs in nine course categories.

QCC has a Center for Workforce Development and Continuing Education, which offers low-cost training programs that enable individuals to learn new skills that can be applied on the job or used for future professional development. The center works closely with local companies and organizations to meet specific organizational goals.

Beginning in Fall 2024, QCC (in addition to all other Massachusetts community colleges) will be free to all Massachusetts students without a prior college degree, in accordance with the MassEducate program.

== Accreditation ==
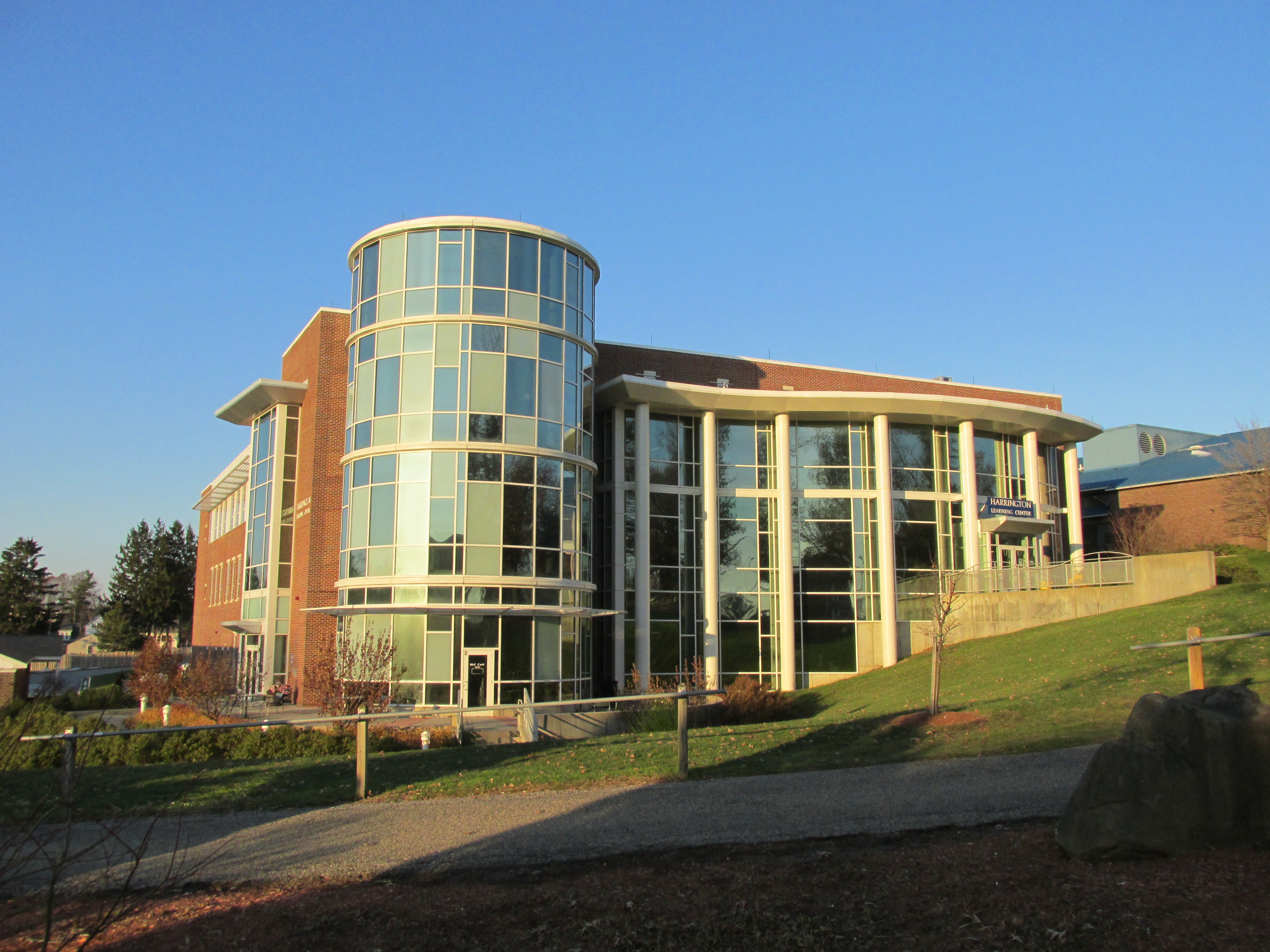
The Harrington Learning Center on the campus of Quinsigamond Community College in 2012.

QCC is accredited by the New England Commission of Higher Education. Individual programs of study are also fully accredited by specific agencies such the American Dental Association, the American Occupational Therapy Association, the Commission on Accreditation of Allied Health Education Programs, the National Association for the Education of Young Children, and the National League for Nursing.

== Athletics ==
QCC is part of the Massachusetts Community College Athletic Association, and competes in Division III of the National Junior College Athletic Association.

In 2010, QCC athletes became known as the Wyverns, after the legendary, two-legged dragon.

== Notable faculty ==
- Fannie Gaston-Johansson, professor of nursing

== Notable alumni ==
- Richie Barker, Major League Baseball player
- John Binienda, member of the Massachusetts House of Representatives
- Brooke Brodack, viral video comedian
- Jay Cutler, professional bodybuilder and four-time Mr. Olympia
- Rick Hayes, member of the Connecticut House of Representatives
- Michael Moore, member of the Massachusetts Senate
- Brian Skerry, photographer
- Tanyon Sturtze, Major League Baseball player

== See also ==
- Colleges of Worcester Consortium
- Massachusetts Community College Athletic Association
- List of NJCAA Division III schools
- Eliminalia - used QCC's message boards
