= Luis G. Pedraja =

Luis G. Pedraja is a Cuban-born theologian, philosopher, author, scholar and educator. Pedraja has contributed to Latino/a theology. He has worked on process philosophy and postmodernism, and higher education.

== Biography ==
Born in Cienfuegos, Cuba on May 25, 1963, Pedraja emigrated to Spain with his parents in 1969 and later to Miami, Florida where he spent most of his childhood. He attended Stetson University, receiving a B.A. in religion in 1984, during which time he was ordained as a Baptist minister and worked with migrant workers in Central Florida. Upon graduation he continued his studies at the Southern Baptist Theological Seminary in Louisville, Kentucky, earning his M.Div. in 1987. Pedraja continued his education at the University of Virginia where he received his Ph.D. in Philosophy and Theology in 1994.

Pedraja taught religion, philosophy, and theology at the University of Puget Sound (1993–94) and Southern Methodist University (1994–2000). During this time, Pedraja served a co-chair of the Hispanic American Religion, Culture, and Society Group of the American Academy of Religion. In 2000, he became Vice President of Academic Affairs, Dean, and Professor of Theology at Memphis Theological Seminary. In 2004, Pedraja became a vice president at the Middle States Commission on Higher Education and served in that role until 2011. Pedraja served as Provost and Vice President for Academic Affairs at Antioch University Los Angeles from 2011 to 2016. From 2016 to 2017 he served as the Interim Vice Chancellor of Academic Affairs at the Peralta Community College District, which serves four colleges in Alameda, Oakland, and Berkeley. On May 9, 2017, Pedraja was approved by the Massachusetts Board of Higher Education to become the sixth President of Quinsigamond Community College, where he is currently president. Pedraja also served as President of La Comunidad of Hispanic Scholars of Religion (1999–2003) and as the editor of Apuntes, the oldest journal of Latino/a theology from 2000 to 2010.

Pedraja married Amber Lamont Pedraja in 1996. Together they founded two non-profit organizations, WellpetUSA and The Crystal Dove Foundation. Amber Lamont Pedraja died of cancer in 2008. In 2010 he married Leigh Woodruff, an attorney and litigator.

== Scholarship ==
Pedraja has worked in Latino/a theology, focussing on how language and culture affect the Latino/a worldview, and religious and philosophical perspectives. His Christology, explores language, culture, and identity to inform his understanding of Jesus as one who stands with the oppressed. In terms of cultural identity, Pedraja marks a shift in Latino/a theology from ethnocentrism, an effort to assert the significance of one's identity, to transculturalism, which uses identity and culture to promote intercultural dialogue and understanding. His work also proposes using Mestizaje as a way of understanding the question of Jesus' humanity and divinity. In his first book, Jesus is my Uncle, Pedraja also introduces the concept of "ontopraxis," arguing that being and action are interconnected.

Pedraja's scholarship has also focused on process philosophy, particularly focusing on the writings of Alfred North Whitehead, postmodernism, and theodicy. He has worked on higher education policies and practices, particularly in the areas of governance, international quality assurance initiatives, strategic planning, and assessment.

== Publications ==
=== Books ===
- Teología: An Introduction to Hispanic Theology, 2003.
- Jesus is My Uncle: Christology from a Hispanic Perspective, 1999.

=== Editor and contributor ===
- Más Voces: Reflexiones teológicas de la Iglesia Hispana, Editor, 2001.
- Diccionario Ilustrado de Interpretes de la Fe,Associate Editor and Contributor, Justo González, General Editor, 2004. (Also translated to English and Portuguese)

=== Contributions to multi-author works ===
- "Alfred North Whitehead," chapter in Beyond the Pale: Reading Theology from the Margins, Miguel A. De La Torre and Stacey M. Floyd-Thomas, Editors, 2011.
- "Apuntes," "Christology," and "Testimony," in The Encyclopedia of Hispanic Religious Culture, Miguel A. De La Torre, Editor, 2009.
- "Eschatology," in Handbook of Latino/a Theologies, Edwin David Aponte and Miguel A. De La Torre, Editors, 2006.
- "Doing Theology in Spanish: Hispanic Theological Methodology, Dialogue, and Rationality," in Hispanic Christian Thought at the Dawn of the 21st Century: Apuntes in Honor of Justo L. Gonzalez, Alvin Padilla, Roberto Goizueta, Eldin Villafañe, Editors, 2005.
- "Trinity," in U.S. Theologies of Liberation, Miguel A. De La Torre, Editor, 2004.
- "Latino/a Theology," in A New Handbook of Theology, Donald Musser and Joseph Price, Editors, 2003.
- "Whitehead, Deconstruction, and Postmodernism," in Hermeneutics and Difference, Catherine Keller and Anne Daniell, Editors, 2002.
- "In the Face of Evil: Understanding Evil in the Aftermath of Terror," in Strike Terror No More: Theology, Ethics, and the New War, Jon L. Berquist, Editor, 2002.
- "Building Bridges between Communities of Struggle," in The Ties That Bind: African-American and Hispanic-American/Latino Theology in the United States Anthony Pinn and Benjamin Valentin, Editors, 2001.
- "Guideposts Along the Journey: Mapping North American Hispanic Theology," in Protestantes/Protestants: Hispanic Christianity within Mainline Traditions, David Maldonado Jr., Editor, 1999.
