= Massachusetts Community College Athletic Association =

- Association: NJCAA
- Founded: 1970
- Sports fielded: 18 (10 men's, 8 women's)
- No. of teams: 13
- Headquarters: Boston, Massachusetts
- Region: New England (Connecticut, Massachusetts, Rhode Island)

The Massachusetts Community College Athletic Association (MCCAA) is s a member conference of the National Junior College Athletic Association (NJCAA) for junior colleges located in Massachusetts, Connecticut and Rhode Island The conference is a member of the Region 21 of NJCAA. Conference championships are held in most sports and individuals can be named to All-Conference and All-Academic teams.

== Member schools ==
=== Current members ===
The MCCAA currently has 13 full members, all are public schools:

Institution	Location	Founded	Type	Enrollment	Nickname	Joined
Bristol Community College	Fall River, Massachusetts	1965	Public (Note: Part of the Massachusetts Higher Education System.)	11,111	Bayhawks	?
Bunker Hill Community College	Boston, Massachusetts	1973	Public	13,324	Bulldogs	?
Community College of Rhode Island (CCRI)	Warwick, Rhode Island	1964	Public	17,000	Knights	?
Gateway Community College	New Haven, Connecticut	1992	Public (Note: Part of the Connecticut State Colleges and Universities System.)	14,000	Lions	?
Holyoke Community College	Holyoke, Massachusetts	1946	Public	4,217	Cougars	?
Massachusetts Bay Community College (Mass Bay)	Wellesley, Massachusetts	1961	Public	4,400	Buccaneers	?
Massasoit Community College	Brockton, Massachusetts	1966	Public	6,995	Warriors	?
Northern Essex Community College	Haverhill, Massachusetts	1961	Public	500	Knights	?
Quincy College	Quincy, Massachusetts	1958	Public	3,500	Granite	?
Quinsigamond Community College	Worcester, Massachusetts	1963	Public	7,368	Wyverns	?
Roxbury Community College	Boston, Massachusetts	1973	Public	2,382	Tigers	?
Springfield Technical Community College	Springfield, Massachusetts	1967	Public	6,800	Rams	?
University of Connecticut at Avery Point (UConn Avery Point)	Groton, Connecticut	1967	Public (Note: Part of the University of Connecticut System.)	564	Pointers	?

=== Former members ===
The MCCAA had one former full member, which was also a private school:

Institution	Location	Founded	Type	Enrollment	Nickname	Joined	Left	Current conference
Benjamin Franklin Institute of Technology	Boston, Massachusetts	1908	Nonsectarian	500	Chargers	?	2020	N/A (Note: Discontinued its intercollegiate athletics program.)
