= New England Women's and Men's Athletic Conference =

NCAA Division III athletic conference

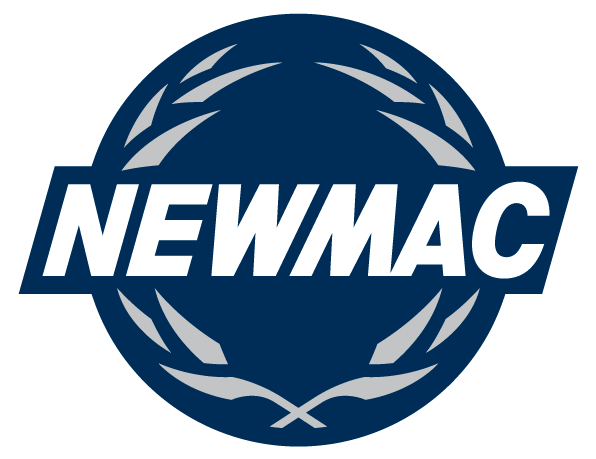
- Formerly: New England Women's 8 New England Women's 6
- Association: NCAA
- Founded: 1985; 41 years ago
- Commissioner: Patrick B. Summers (since 2011)
- Sports fielded: 19; men's: 8; women's: 11
- Division: Division III
- No. of teams: 12 full (13 full in 2027), 4 affiliate
- Headquarters: Westwood, Massachusetts
- Region: New England
- Website: newmacsports.com

Locations
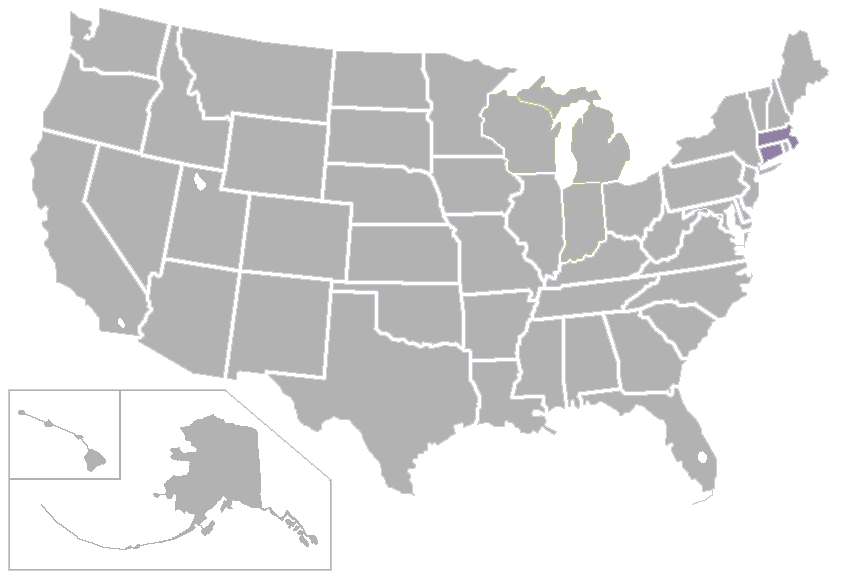

The New England Women's and Men's Athletic Conference (NEWMAC) is an intercollegiate athletic conference affiliated with the NCAA's Division III. Member institutions are located in the northeastern United States in the states of Connecticut, Massachusetts, and Rhode Island.

== History ==
New England Women's and Men's Athletic Conference full members
Locations of NEWMAC full members
Full Football Playing Member
Full Non-Football Playing Member
Full Women's College member (all a part of Seven Sisters)
Future Football Playing Member

The NEWMAC was established in 1998, when the former New England Women's 8 Conference (NEW 8) voted to begin sponsoring conference play and championships for men. At this time, the conference expanded its membership to include Springfield College and the United States Coast Guard Academy.

The NEW 8 began play in 1985–86 as the New England Women's 6 Conference (NEW 6). Charter members were Babson College, Brandeis University, Massachusetts Institute of Technology (MIT), Smith College, Wellesley College and Wheaton College. Mount Holyoke College and Worcester Polytechnic Institute (WPI) joined in 1988 and the name was changed to the NEW 8 Conference. At the conclusion of the 1994–95 academic year, Brandeis University withdrew from the NEW 8 to join the University Athletic Association (where its men's sports competed at that time) and Clark University accepted membership, keeping the NEW 8's membership at eight institutions.

In March 2012, NEWMAC announced the addition of Emerson College as the 11th full member of the league starting in the 2013–14 academic year. With the addition of Emerson the NEWMAC began re-sponsoring the sport of men's lacrosse, adding an affiliate member, Massachusetts Maritime Academy. In July 2012, the conference welcomed Simmons College as an affiliate member to compete in the sport of rowing.

In April 2015, the conference office announced it would begin sponsoring football in the 2017 season, with Maine Maritime Academy, the United States Merchant Marine Academy and Norwich University as affiliate members. On September 29, 2015, NEWMAC announced the addition of the Catholic University of America as another associate member in football effective July 1, 2017, and on June 23, 2021, the conference added the State University of New York Maritime College (SUNY Maritime) as its new football affiliate in 2023, leaving the Eastern Collegiate Football Conference after the 2022 season.

In February 2022, the Landmark Conference announced that it would begin sponsoring football starting in the 2023–24 season, thus the Catholic University of America, a NEWMAC football affiliate, departed after the 2022–23 season.

On August 19, 2025, the NEWMAC announced that it would add men's volleyball as a sponsored sport, with the first season in spring 2027 (part of the 2026–27 academic year). Full members Emerson, MIT, Springfield, and Wheaton were joined by three associates, namely the State University of New York at New Paltz (New Paltz), New York University (NYU), and Vassar College.

=== Chronological timeline ===
- 1985 – The NEWMAC was established as the New England Women's 6 Conference (NEW-6). Charter members included Babson College, Brandeis University, Massachusetts Institute of Technology (MIT), Smith College, Wellesley College and Wheaton College, beginning the 1985–86 academic year.
- 1988:
  - The NEW-6 was rebranded as the New England Women's 8 Conference (NEW-8), beginning the 1988–89 academic year.
  - Mount Holyoke College and Worcester Polytechnic Institute (WPI) joined the NEW-8 in the 1988–89 academic year.
- 1995:
  - Brandeis left the NEW-8 to fully align along with its men's sports in the University Athletic Association (UAA) after the 1994–95 academic year.
  - Clark University joined the NEW-8 in the 1995–96 academic year.
- 1998:
  - The NEW-8 offered men's sports and was rebranded as the New England Women's and Men's Athletic Conference (NEWMAC), beginning the 1998–99 academic year.
  - Springfield College and the United States Coast Guard Academy (Coast Guard) joined the NEWMAC in the 1998–99 academic year; thus being the 1st schools with men's and women's sports to join the newly branded conference.
- 2012 – Simmons University joined the NEWMAC as an associate member for rowing in the 2012–13 academic year.
- 2013:
  - Emerson College joined the NEWMAC in the 2013–14 academic year.
  - The NEWMAC had absorbed the Pilgrim Lacrosse League to re-add men's lacrosse as a sponsored sport, while having the addition of Massachusetts Maritime Academy as an associate member for that sport, beginning the 2014 spring season (2013–14 academic year).
- 2015 – The NEWMAC added football as a sponsored sport, while having the additions as associate members for that sport: Maine Maritime Academy, Norwich University, the United States Merchant Marine Academy and the Catholic University of America, beginning the 2017 fall season (2017–18 academic year).
- 2019 – Massachusetts Maritime left the NEWMAC as an associate member for men's lacrosse after the 2019 spring season (2018–19 academic year).
- 2023:
  - Catholic (D.C.) left the NEWMAC as an associate member for football to join the Landmark Conference for that sport after the 2022 fall season (2022–23 academic year); as that conference had announced that it would sponsor that sport, beginning the 2023 fall season (2023–24 academic year).
  - Salve Regina University joined the NEWMAC in the 2023–24 academic year.
  - The State University of New York Maritime College joined the NEWMAC as an associate member for football in the 2023 fall season (2023–24 academic year).
- 2026 – The NEWMAC added men's volleyball as a sponsored sport starting with the 2027 spring season (2026–27 academic year), with four full members being joined by three new affiliates: the State University of New York at New Paltz (New Paltz), New York University (NYU) and Vassar College.
- 2027 – Saint Anselm College will join the NEWMAC (via transition from the NCAA Division II ranks), beginning the 2027–28 academic year.

== Member schools ==
=== Current members ===
The NEWMAC currently has 12 full members; all but one are private schools.

Institution	Location	Founded	Affiliation	Undergraduate Enrollment	Acceptance Rate	Nickname	Colors	Joined (Note: Represents the calendar year when fall sports competition begins.)
Babson College	Wellesley, Massachusetts	1919	Nonsectarian	2,350	26%	Beavers		1985
Clark University	Worcester, Massachusetts	1887	Nonsectarian	2,242	54%	Cougars		1995
Emerson College	Boston, Massachusetts	1880	Nonsectarian	4,113	33%	Lions		2013
Massachusetts Institute of Technology (MIT)	Cambridge, Massachusetts	1861	Nonsectarian	4,638	8%	Engineers		1985
Mount Holyoke College (Note: This institution is a women's college, therefore it does not compete in men's sports.)	South Hadley, Massachusetts	1837	Nonsectarian	2,200	55%	Lyons		1987
Salve Regina University	Newport, Rhode Island	1934	Roman Catholic (R.S.M.)	2,872	73%	Seahawks		2023
Smith College	Northampton, Massachusetts	1871	Nonsectarian	2,100	42%	Bears		1985
Springfield College	Springfield, Massachusetts	1885	Nonsectarian	2,228	68%	Pride		1998
United States Coast Guard Academy (Coast Guard)	New London, Connecticut	1876	Federal/Military	1,049	18%	Bears		1998
Wellesley College	Wellesley, Massachusetts	1870	Nonsectarian	2,383	30%	Blue		1985
Wheaton College	Norton, Massachusetts	1834	Nonsectarian	1,701	70%	Lyons		1985
Worcester Polytechnic Institute (WPI)	Worcester, Massachusetts	1865	Nonsectarian	4,892	44%	Engineers		1987

=== Future members ===
The NEWMAC will have one new full member, a private school:

Institution	Location	Founded	Affiliation	Undergraduate Enrollment	Acceptance Rate	Nickname	Colors	Joining (Note: Represents the calendar year when fall sports competition begins.)	Current conference
Saint Anselm College	Goffstown, New Hampshire	1889	Catholic (Benedictines)	2,094	78%	Hawks		2027	Northeast-10 (NE-10) (Note: Currently an NCAA Division II athletic conference.)

=== Former member ===
The NEWMAC had one former full member, a private school:

Institution	Location	Founded	Affiliation	Undergraduate Enrollment	Nickname	Colors	Joined (Note: Represents the calendar year when fall sports competition begins.)	Left (Note: Represents the calendar year when spring sports competition ends.)	Current conference
Brandeis University (Note: Brandeis's women's athletics programs were in the NEWMAC while their men's athletics programs were in the University Athletic Association (UAA). Ever since, the women's athletics programs moved over to the UAA in the 1995–96 school year.)	Waltham, Massachusetts	1948	Private	3,591	Judges		1985	1995	University (UAA)

=== Affiliate members ===
The NEWMAC currently has seven affiliate members—four private, two state-supported, and one federal service academy.

Institution	Location	Founded	Affiliation	Enrollment	Nickname	Joined (Note: Represents the calendar year when fall sports competition begins.)	NEWMAC sport(s)	Primary conference
New York University (NYU)	New York, New York	1831	Private	29,760 (Note: Undergraduate enrollment; total enrollment is 61,890.)	Violets	2026	Men's volleyball	University (UAA)
Norwich University	Northfield, Vermont	1819	Private (Military)	3,400	Cadets	2017	Football	Great Northeast (GNAC)
Simmons University	Boston, Massachusetts	1899	Nonsectarian	4,933	Sharks	2013	Women's rowing	Great Northeast (GNAC)
State University of New York Maritime College (SUNY Maritime)	Bronx, New York	1874	Public (Note: Part of the State University of New York System.)	1,671	Privateers	2023	Football	Skyline
State University of New York at New Paltz (SUNY New Paltz, New Paltz)	New Paltz, New York	1828	Public	6,113 (Note: Undergraduate enrollment; total enrollment is 7,147.)	Hawks	2026	Men's volleyball	New Jersey (NJAC)
United States Merchant Marine Academy (Merchant Marine)	Kings Point, New York	1943	Federal	1,011	Mariners	2017	Football	Skyline
Vassar College	Poughkeepsie, New York (Note: The campus is in the town of Poughkeepsie, not the city of the same name.)	1861	Private	2,456	Brewers	2026	Men's volleyball	Liberty (LL)

=== Former affiliate members ===
The NEWMAC had three former affiliate members, all but one are public schools:

Institution	Location	Founded	Affiliation	Enrollment	Nickname	Joined (Note: Represents the calendar year when fall sports competition begins.)	Left (Note: Represents the calendar year when spring sports competition ends.)	NEWMAC sport(s)	Current primary conference
The Catholic University of America	Washington, D.C.	1887	Catholic (Pontifical)	6,725	Cardinals	2017	2023	Football	Landmark
Maine Maritime Academy	Castine, Maine	1941	Public	900	Mariners	2017	2020	Football	North Atlantic (NAC)
Massachusetts Maritime Academy	Buzzards Bay, Massachusetts	1891	Public	1,637	Buccaneers	2005	2019	Men's lacrosse	Massachusetts (MASCAC)

=== Membership timeline ===
New England Women's and Men's
Athletic Conference affiliate members
Locations of NEWMAC members, 2024-2025 Football Affiliate Women's Rowing Affiliate Former Affiliate

Full member (all sports) Full member (non-football) Associate member (football) Associate member (sport)

== Sports ==
The NEWMAC sponsors intercollegiate athletic competition in the following sports:

Conference sports
Sport	Men's	Women's
Baseball	✓	
Basketball	✓	✓
Cross Country	✓	✓
Field Hockey		✓
Football	✓	
Lacrosse	✓	✓
Rowing		✓
Soccer	✓	✓
Softball		✓
Swimming & Diving	✓	✓
Tennis	✓	✓
Track & Field (Outdoor)	✓	✓
Volleyball	✓	✓

=== Men's sports ===
School	Baseball	Basketball	Cross Country	Football	Lacrosse	Soccer	Swimming & Diving	Tennis	Track & Field (Outdoor)	Volleyball	Total NEWMAC Sports
Babson	✓	✓	✓	✗	✓	✓	✓	✓	✓	✗	8
Clark	✓	✓	✓	✗	✓	✓	✓	✓	✗	✗	7
Coast Guard	✓	✓	✓	✓	✓	✓	✓	✓	✓	✗	9
Emerson	✓	✓	✓	✗	✓	✓	✗	✓	✗	✓	7
MIT	✓	✓	✓	✓	✓	✓	✓	✓	✓	✓	10
Salve Regina	✓	✓	✓	✓	✓	✓	✗	✓	✗	✗	7
Springfield	✓	✓	✓	✓	✓	✓	✓	✓	✓	✓	10
Wheaton	✓	✓	✓	✗	✓	✓	✓	✓	✓	✓	9
WPI	✓	✓	✓	✓	✗	✓	✓	✗	✓	✗	7
Totals	9	9	9	5+3	8	9	7	8	6	4+3	74+6
Affiliate members
Maritime				✓							1
Merchant Marine				✓							1
Norwich				✓							1
NYU										✓	1
SUNY New Paltz										✓	1
Vassar										✓	1
Future member
Saint Anselm	✓	✓	✓	✓	✓	✓	✗	✗	✓	✗	7

==== Men's varsity sports not sponsored by the NEWMAC ====
Future member Saint Anselm in green.

School	Alpine Skiing (Note: Alpine skiing is a subset of the de facto NCAA Division I sport of skiing, which holds a single coeducational championship meet open to all NCAA divisions and incorporating events in both Alpine and Nordic skiing.)	Equestrian (Note: Not an NCAA-sponsored sport.)	Fencing (Note: De facto Division I sport. The NCAA championships in fencing, gymnastics, rifle, and water polo are open to members of all NCAA divisions. The rifle championship is a single coeducational championship; the other sports have separate men's and women's championships.)	Golf	Gymnastics	Ice Hockey	Rifle	Rowing	Sailing	Squash	Track & Field (Indoor)	Water Polo	Wrestling
Babson	USCSA			IND		LEC							
Coast Guard								IND	NEISA		IND		NEWA
MIT			NFC				IND	IND	NEISA	CSA	IND	NWPC	
Saint Anselm				LEC		LEC							
Salve Regina		IHSA				CNE			NEISA				
Springfield				MASCAC	EIGL						IND		NEWA
Wheaton			NFC								IND	MPSF	
WPI								IND			IND		NEWA

=== Women's sports ===
School	Basketball	Cross Country	Field Hockey	Lacrosse	Rowing	Soccer	Softball	Swimming & Diving	Tennis	Track & Field (Outdoor)	Volleyball	Total NEWMAC Sports
Babson	✓	✓	✓	✓	✗	✓	✓	✓	✓	✓	✓	10
Clark	✓	✓	✓	✓	✓	✓	✓	✓	✓	✗	✓	10
Coast Guard	✓	✓	✗	✓	✓	✓	✓	✓	✗	✓	✓	9
Emerson	✓	✓	✗	✓	✗	✓	✓	✗	✓	✗	✓	7
MIT	✓	✓	✓	✓	✗ (Note: MIT women's rowing competes at the Division I level as an affiliate member of the Patriot League.)	✓	✓	✓	✓	✓	✓	10
Mount Holyoke	✓	✓	✓	✓	✓	✓	✗	✓	✗	✓	✓	9
Salve Regina	✓	✓	✓	✓	✗	✓	✓	✗	✓	✓	✓	9
Smith	✓	✓	✓	✓	✓	✓	✓	✓	✓	✓	✓	11
Springfield	✓	✓	✓	✓	✗	✓	✓	✓	✓	✓	✓	10
Wellesley	✓	✓	✓	✓	✓	✓	✓	✓	✓	✓	✓	11
Wheaton	✓	✓	✓	✓	✗	✓	✓	✓	✓	✓	✓	10
WPI	✓	✓	✓	✗	✓	✓	✓	✓	✗	✓	✓	9
Totals	12	12	10	11	6+1	12	11	10	9	10	12	115+1
Affiliate members
Simmons					✓							1
Future members
Saint Anselm	✓	✓	✓	✓	✗	✓	✓	✗	✓	✓	✓	9

==== Women's varsity sports not sponsored by the NEWMAC ====
Future member Saint Anselm in green.

School	Alpine Skiing (Note: Alpine skiing is a subset of the de facto NCAA Division I sport of skiing, which holds a single coeducational championship meet open to all NCAA divisions and incorporating events in both Alpine and Nordic skiing.)	Artistic Swimming (Note: Not an NCAA-sponsored sport.)	Bowling (Note: De facto Division I sport; the NCAA bowling championship is open to members of all three NCAA divisions through 2026–27. The sport's status with respect to Division III is not expected to be affected by the establishment of a separate Division II championship in 2027–28.)	Equestrian (Note: Although recognized as part of the NCAA Emerging Sports for Women program, Division III has not added that sport to the program.)	Fencing (Note: De facto Division I sport. The NCAA championships in fencing, gymnastics, rifle, and water polo are open to members of all NCAA divisions. The rifle championship is a single coeducational championship; the other sports have separate men's and women's championships.)	Golf	Gymnastics	Ice Hockey	Rifle	Sailing	Track & Field (Indoor)	Water Polo	Wrestling (Note: De facto Division I sport in 2026–27, with the NCAA championship open to members of all NCAA divisions. Starting in 2027–28, a separate Division III championship will be established.)
Babson	USCSA					CWGC							
Coast Guard										NEISA	IND		
MIT					NFC				IND	NEISA	IND		
Mount Holyoke				IHSA							IND		
Saint Anselm			ECC (Note: Has not announced a future affiliation for this sport.)			LEC		LEC					
Salve Regina				IHSA				CNE		NEISA			
Smith											IND		
Springfield							NCGA				IND		2027-28
Wellesley					NFC	LL					IND		
Wheaton		MPSF			NFC						IND	CWPA	
WPI											IND		
