= Little East Conference =

American intercollegiate athletic conference

- Association: NCAA
- Founded: 1986
- Commissioner: Al Bean (since September 2, 2024)
- Sports fielded: 19; men's: 8; women's: 11
- Division: Division III
- No. of teams: 9 (8 in 2027)
- Headquarters: North Providence, Rhode Island
- Region: New England
- Website: littleeast.com

Locations
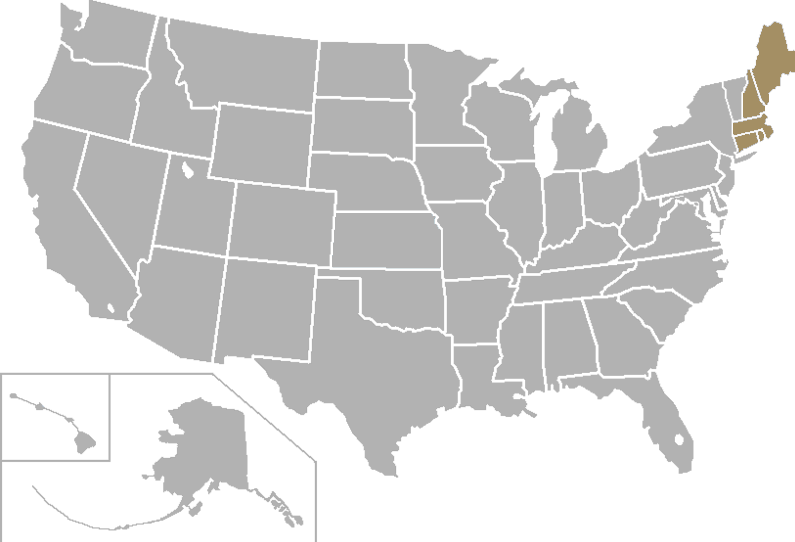

The Little East Conference (LEC) is an intercollegiate athletic conference that competes in the National Collegiate Athletic Association (NCAA) Division III. The member institutions are located in all six states of New England.

== History ==
Little East Conference
Locations of Little East members, 2025–2026 full, departing, and associate

=== Recent events ===
On May 20, 2026, Lasell University, and Worcester State University accepted an invitation to join the Little East as associate members for women's golf, beginning the 2026-27 academic year.

On May 20, 2026, Gordon College accepted an invitation to join the Little East as associate members for men's and women's swimming & diving, beginning the 2026-27 academic year.

On October 8, 2025, Massachusetts Maritime Academy and Salem State accepted an invitation to leave the Little East as associate members for men's lacrosse to join the MASCAC as full members, as the MASCAC has announced it to be a sponsored sport, beginning the 2026-27 academic year.

=== Chronological timeline ===
- 1986 – On April 28, 1986, the Little East Conference (LEC) was founded. Charter members included Eastern Connecticut State University, the University of Massachusetts Boston, Southeastern Massachusetts University (now the University of Massachusetts Dartmouth), Plymouth State College (now Plymouth State University), Rhode Island College and the University of Southern Maine; beginning the 1986–87 academic year.
- 1993 – Western Connecticut State University joined the Little East in the 1993–94 academic year.
- 1997 – Keene State College joined the Little East in the 1997–98 academic year.
- 2000 – Seven institutions joined the Little East as associate members, all effective in the 2000–01 academic year:
  - Bridgewater State University, Fitchburg State University, Framingham State University, Salem State University, Westfield State University and Worcester State University for field hockey as the MASCAC division in fall
  - and Salem State for men's lacrosse in spring
- 2003 – Salem State added men's tennis into its Little East associate membership in the 2004 spring season (2003–04 academic year).
- 2004 – Two institutions added certain single sports into their Little East associate memberships, both effective in the 2005 spring season (2004–05 academic year):
  - Bridgewater State for men's and women's tennis
  - and Salem State for women's tennis
- 2010 – Three institutions added certain single sports into their Little East associate memberships, all effective in the 2010–11 academic year:
  - Worcester State for women's tennis
  - and Bridgewater State and Westfield State for women's swimming & diving
- 2014 – Bridgewater State left the Little East as an associate member for women's swimming & diving after the 2013–14 academic year.
- 2018 – Castleton University (now Vermont State University–Castleton) joined the Little East in the 2018–19 academic year.
- 2019 – Massachusetts Maritime Academy joined the Little East as an associate member for men's lacrosse in the 2020 spring season (2019–20 academic year).
- 2020:
  - Worcester State left the Little East as an associate member for women's tennis after the 2020 spring season (2019–20 academic year).
  - Western New England University joined the Little East as an associate member for women's swimming & diving in the 2020–21 academic year; although due to the COVID-19 pandemic, they didn't begin to compete within conference play until 2021–22.
- 2021 – Bridgewater State added men's swimming & diving (with the return of women's swimming & diving) into its Little East associate membership in the 2021–22 academic year.
- 2022:
  - The University of New England joined the Little East as an associate member for women's swimming & diving in the 2022–23 academic year.
  - Bridgewater State, Fitchburg State, Framingham State, Salem State, Westfield State and Worcester State left the Little East as associate members for field hockey after the 2022 fall season (2022–23 academic year); as the MASCAC announced to have it as a sponsored sport.
- 2024 – Husson University, Maine Maritime Academy and the State University of New York at Delhi (SUNY Delhi) joined the Little East as associate members for men's and women's swimming & diving in the 2024–25 academic year.
- 2025:
  - Five institutions joined the Little East as associate members (and/or added other single sports into their associate memberships), all effective in the 2025–26 academic year:
    - Babson College for men's ice hockey
    - Husson and Westfield State for women's golf
    - and New England College and Norwich University for men's and women's ice hockey
  - SUNY Delhi left the Little East as an associate member for men's and women's swimming & diving after the 2024-25 season to join the SUNYAC.
- 2026
  - Three institutions joined the Little East as associate members (and/or added other single sports into their associate memberships), all effective in the 2026–27 academic year:
    - Lasell University and Worcester State for women's golf
    - Gordon College for men's and women's swimming & diving
  - Mass Maritime and Salem State left the Little East as associate members for men's lacrosse after the 2026 spring season (2025–26 academic year); as the MASCAC announced to have it as its 20th sponsored sport.
- 2027 – VTSU–Castleton will leave the Little East to join the Massachusetts State Collegiate Athletic Conference (MASCAC) after the 2026–27 academic year.

== Member schools ==
=== Current members ===
The Little East currently has nine full members, all are public schools:

Institution	Location	Founded	Affiliation	Enrollment	Nickname	Joined (Note: Represents the calendar year when fall sports competition begins.)	Colors
Eastern Connecticut State University	Willimantic, Connecticut	1889	Public	4,355	Warriors	1986	
Keene State College	Keene, New Hampshire	1909	Public	2,848	Owls	1997	
Plymouth State University	Plymouth, New Hampshire	1871	Public	3,707	Panthers	1986	
Rhode Island College	Providence, Rhode Island	1854	Public	6,155	Anchormen & Anchorwomen	1986	
University of Massachusetts Boston	Boston, Massachusetts	1964	Public	15,575	Beacons	1986	
University of Massachusetts Dartmouth	Dartmouth, Massachusetts	1895	Public	7,968	Corsairs	1986	
University of Southern Maine	Gorham, Maine (Note: The University of Southern Maine's main campus is located at Gorham; with other campuses at Lewiston and Portland.)	1878	Public	7,604	Huskies	1986	
Vermont State University-Castleton	Castleton, Vermont	1787 (Note: Originally founded in 1787 as Rutland County Grammar School, which would later become Castleton University in 2015; then was refounded as a campus of Vermont State University in 2023.)	Public	5,093	Spartans	2018	
Western Connecticut State University	Danbury, Connecticut	1903	Public	4,169	Wolves	1993	

=== Associate members ===
The Little East currently has 15 associate members, all but seven are private schools:

Institution	Location	Founded	Affiliation	Enrollment	Nickname	Joined (Note: Represents the calendar year when fall sports competition begins.)	LEC sport(s)	Primary conference
Babson College	Wellesley, Massachusetts	1919	Nonsectarian	3,932	Beavers	2025	men's ice hockey	NEWMAC
Bridgewater State University (Note: Bridgewater State competed in the Little East as an associate member for field hockey from the 2000 to 2022 fall seasons (2000–01 to 2022–23 school years).)	Bridgewater, Massachusetts	1840	Public (Note: Part of the Massachusetts State Universities System.)	9,727	Bears	2004^{m.ten.}	men's tennis	MASCAC
Bridgewater State University	Bridgewater, Massachusetts	1840	Public	9,727	Bears	2004^{w.ten.}	women's tennis	MASCAC
Bridgewater State University	Bridgewater, Massachusetts	1840	Public	9,727	Bears	2021^{m.s.d.}	men's swimming & diving	MASCAC
Bridgewater State University	Bridgewater, Massachusetts	1840	Public	9,727	Bears	2021^{w.s.d.}	women's swimming & diving (Note: Bridgewater State previously competed in the Little East as an associate member for women's swimming & diving from the 2010–11 to 2013–14 school years.)	MASCAC
Gordon College	Wenham, Massachusetts	1889	Evangelical	1,816	Fighting Scots	2026^{m.s.d.}	men's swimming & diving	CNE
Gordon College	Wenham, Massachusetts	1889	Evangelical	1,816	Fighting Scots	2026^{w.s.d.}	women's swimming & diving	CNE
Husson University	Bangor, Maine	1898	Nonsectarian	3,367	Eagles	2024^{m.s.d.}	men's swimming & diving	NAC
Husson University	Bangor, Maine	1898	Nonsectarian	3,367	Eagles	2024^{w.s.d.}	women's swimming & diving	NAC
Husson University	Bangor, Maine	1898	Nonsectarian	3,367	Eagles	2025^{w.gf.}	women's golf	NAC
Lasell University	Newton, Massachusetts	1851	Nonsectarian	2,200	Lasers	2026	women's golf	GNAC
Maine Maritime Academy	Castine, Maine	1941	Public	971	Mariners	2024^{m.s.d.}	men's swimming & diving	NAC
Maine Maritime Academy	Castine, Maine	1941	Public	971	Mariners	2024^{w.s.d.}	women's swimming & diving	NAC
New England College	Henniker, New Hampshire	1946	Nonsectarian	3,275	Pilgrims	2025^{m.i.h.}	men's ice hockey	GNAC
New England College	Henniker, New Hampshire	1946	Nonsectarian	3,275	Pilgrims	2025^{w.i.h.}	women's ice hockey	GNAC
University of New England	Biddeford, Maine	1831	Nonsectarian	6,573	Nor'easters	2022	women's swimming & diving	CNE
Norwich University	Northfield, Vermont	1819	U.S. SMC	3,149	Cadets	2025^{m.i.h.}	men's ice hockey	GNAC
Norwich University	Northfield, Vermont	1819	U.S. SMC	3,149	Cadets	2025^{w.i.h.}	women's ice hockey	GNAC
Salem State University	Salem, Massachusetts	1854	Public	6,230	Vikings	2003^{m.ten.}	men's tennis	MASCAC
Salem State University	Salem, Massachusetts	1854	Public	6,230	Vikings	2004^{w.ten.}	women's tennis	MASCAC
Western New England University	Springfield, Massachusetts	1919	Nonsectarian	3,674	Golden Bears	2020 (Note: Western New England joined the Little East as an associate member for women's swimming & diving during the 2020–21 school year. However, since it was during the pandemic, the Golden Bears didn't began to compete within conference play until 2021–22.)	women's swimming & diving	CNE
Westfield State University	Westfield, Massachusetts	1838	Public	4,588	Owls	2010^{w.s.d.}	women's swimming & diving	MASCAC
Westfield State University	Westfield, Massachusetts	1838	Public	4,588	Owls	2025^{w.gf.}	women's golf	MASCAC
Worcester State University	Worcester	1874	Public	5,611	Lancers	2026	women's golf	MASCAC

=== Future associate members ===
The Little East will have one new associate members, a private schools:

Institution	Location	Founded	Affiliation	Enrollment	Nickname	Joining (Note: Represents the calendar year when fall sports competition begins.)	LEC sport(s)	Primary conference
Saint Anselm College	Goffstown, New Hampshire	1889	Catholic (Benedictines)	2,094	Hawks	2027^{m.gf.}	men's golf	Northeast-10 (NE-10) (NEWMAC in 2027.)
Saint Anselm College	Goffstown, New Hampshire	1889	Catholic (Benedictines)	2,094	Hawks	2027^{w.gf.}	women's golf	Northeast-10 (NE-10) (NEWMAC in 2027.)
Saint Anselm College	Goffstown, New Hampshire	1889	Catholic (Benedictines)	2,094	Hawks	2027^{m.i.h.}	men's ice hockey	Northeast-10 (NE-10) (NEWMAC in 2027.)
Saint Anselm College	Goffstown, New Hampshire	1889	Catholic (Benedictines)	2,094	Hawks	2027^{w.i.h.}	women's ice hockey	Northeast-10 (NE-10) (NEWMAC in 2027.)

=== Former associate members ===
The Little East had six former associate members, all of which were also public schools:

Institution	Location	Founded	Affiliation	Nickname	Joined (Note: Represents the calendar year when fall sports competition begins.)	Left (Note: Represents the calendar year when spring sports competition ends.)	LEC sport(s)	Primary conference
Bridgewater State University (Note: Bridgewater State remains in the Little East as an associate member for women's swimming & diving since 2021–22; which they previously competed from 2010–11 to 2013–14.)	Bridgewater, Massachusetts	1840	Public (Note: Part of the Massachusetts State Universities System.)	Bears	2000	2023	field hockey	MASCAC
Fitchburg State University	Fitchburg, Massachusetts	1894	Public	Falcons	2000	2023	field hockey	MASCAC
Framingham State University	Framingham, Massachusetts	1839	Public	Rams	2000	2023	field hockey	MASCAC
Massachusetts Maritime Academy	Buzzards Bay, Massachusetts	1891	Public	Buccaneers	2019	2026	men's lacrosse	MASCAC
Salem State University	Salem, Massachusetts	1854	Public	Vikings	2000^{f.h.}	2023^{f.h.}	field hockey	MASCAC
Salem State University	Salem, Massachusetts	1854	Public	Vikings	2000^{m.lax.}	2026^{m.lax.}	men's lacrosse	MASCAC
State University of New York at Delhi (SUNY Delhi)	Delhi, New York	1913	Public	Broncos	2024	2025	men's swimming & diving	SUNYAC
State University of New York at Delhi (SUNY Delhi)	Delhi, New York	1913	Public	Broncos	2024	2025	women's swimming & diving	SUNYAC
Westfield State University	Westfield, Massachusetts	1838	Public	Owls	2000	2023	field hockey	MASCAC
Worcester State University	Worcester, Massachusetts	1874	Public	Lancers	2000^{f.h.}	2023^{f.h.}	field hockey	MASCAC
Worcester State University	Worcester, Massachusetts	1874	Public	Lancers	2010^{w.ten.}	2020^{w.ten.}	women's tennis	MASCAC

=== Membership timeline ===
Full member (all sports) Full member (non-football) Associate member (football) Associate member (sport)

== Sports ==
Conference Sports

Sport	Men's	Women's
Baseball	✓	
Basketball	✓	✓
Cross Country	✓	✓
Field Hockey		✓
Golf	✓	✓
Ice Hockey	✓	✓
Lacrosse	✓	✓
Soccer	✓	✓
Softball		✓
Swimming & Diving	✓	✓
Tennis	✓	✓
Track & Field (Indoor)	✓	✓
Track & Field (Outdoor)	✓	✓
Volleyball		✓

=== Men's sports ===
School	Baseball	Basketball	Cross Country	Golf	Ice Hockey	Lacrosse	Soccer	Swimming & Diving	Tennis	Track & Field (Indoor)	Track & Field (Outdoor)	Total LEC Sports
Castleton	✓	✓	✓	✓	✓	✓	✓	✗	✓	✓	✓	10
Eastern Connecticut	✓	✓	✓	✓	✗	✓	✓	✓ (Note: Swimming only)	✗	✓	✓	9
Keene State	✓	✓	✓	✓	✓	✓	✓	✓	✗	✓	✓	10
Plymouth State	✓	✓	✓	✗	✓	✓	✓	✓	✗	✓	✓	9
Rhode Island College	✓	✓	✓	✓	✗	✗ (Note: Adding in 2027-28)	✓	✗	✓	✓	✓	8
Southern Maine	✓	✓	✓	✓	✓	✓	✓	✗	✓	✓	✓	10
UMass Boston	✓	✓	✓	✗	✓	✓	✓	✗	✓	✓	✓	9
UMass Dartmouth	✓	✓	✓	✗	✓	✓	✓	✓	✗	✓	✓	9
Western Connecticut	✓	✓	✓	✓	✓	✓	✓	✗	✓	✓	✓	10
Totals	9	9	9	6	7+3	8	9	4+4	5+2	9	9	84+9
Associate Members
Babson					✓							1
Bridgewater State								✓	✓			2
Gordon								✓				1
Husson								✓				1
Maine Maritime								✓				1
New England College					✓							1
Norwich					✓							1
Salem State									✓			1

==== Men's varsity sports not sponsored by the Little East Conference that are played by Little East schools ====
School	Alpine Skiing	Football	Volleyball	Wrestling
Castleton	USCSA	NJAC		NEWA
Plymouth State	EISA	MASCAC		NEWA
Rhode Island College			GNAC	NEWA
Southern Maine				NEWA
UMass Dartmouth		MASCAC		
Western Connecticut		Landmark		

=== Women's sports ===
School	Basketball	Cross Country	Field Hockey	Golf	Ice Hockey	Lacrosse	Soccer	Softball	Swimming & Diving	Tennis	Track & Field (Indoor)	Track & Field (Outdoor)	Volleyball	Total LEC Sports
Castleton	✓	✓	✓	✗	✓	✓	✓	✓	✗	✓	✓	✓	✓	11
Eastern Connecticut	✓	✓	✓	✓	✗	✓	✓	✓	✓ (Note: Swimming only)	✗	✓	✓	✓	11
Keene State	✓	✓	✓	✓	✓	✓	✓	✓	✓	✗	✓	✓	✓	12
Plymouth State	✓	✓	✓	✗	✓	✓	✓	✓	✓	✓	✓	✓	✓	12
Rhode Island College	✓	✓	✗	✓	✗	✓	✓	✓	✓	✓	✓	✓	✓	11
Southern Maine	✓	✓	✓	✓	✓	✓	✓	✓	✗	✓	✓	✓	✓	12
UMass Boston	✓	✓	✓	✗	✓	✓	✓	✓	✗	✓	✓	✓	✓	11
UMass Dartmouth	✓	✓	✓	✗	✗	✓	✓	✓	✓	✓	✓	✓	✓	11
Western Connecticut	✓	✓	✓	✓	✓	✓	✓	✓	✗	✓	✓	✓	✓	12
Totals	9	9	8	5+4	6+2	9	9	9	5+7	7+2	9	9	9	103+15
Associate Members
Bridgewater State									✓	✓				2
Husson				✓					✓					2
Lasell				✓										1
Maine Maritime									✓					1
New England College					✓									1
U. of New England									✓					1
Norwich					✓									1
Salem State										✓				1
Western New England									✓					1
Westfield State				✓					✓					2
Worcester State				✓										1

==== Women's varsity sports not sponsored by the Little East Conference that are played by Little East schools ====
School	Alpine Skiing	Flag Football	Gymnastics	Rugby
Castleton	USCSA			✓
Eastern Connecticut		✓		
Plymouth State	EISA			
Rhode Island College			NCGA	
UMass Dartmouth		2027-28		
