= Massachusetts Maritime Buccaneers =

- University: Massachusetts Maritime Academy
- Conference: MASCAC (primary); LEC; NEISA
- NCAA: Division III
- Athletic director: Mike Kelley
- Location: Buzzards Bay, Massachusetts
- Varsity teams: 15 (7 Men's, 7 Women's, 1 co-ed)
- Football stadium: Clean Harbors Stadium
- Baseball stadium: Commodore William R. Hendy Field
- Softball stadium: Allison Rollins Field
- Other venues: Clean Harbors Athletic Center
- Mascot: Bucky the Buccaneer
- Nickname: Buccaneers
- Colors: Maritime Blue and Vegas Gold
- Website: mmabucs.com/landing/index
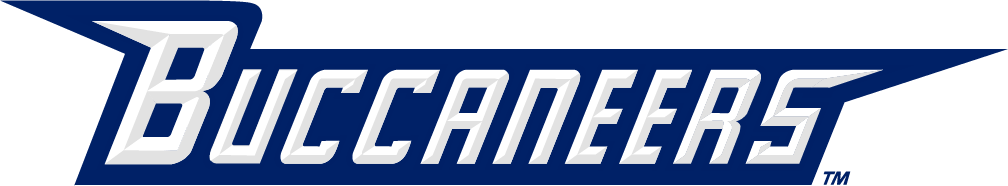

The Massachusetts Maritime Buccaneers (also called the Mass Maritime Buccaneers) are composed of 15 varsity teams (7 men's 7 women's 1 co-ed) representing the Massachusetts Maritime Academy in intercollegiate athletics. All teams compete at the NCAA Division III level and all teams compete in the Massachusetts State Collegiate Athletic Conference (MASCAC), except for men's lacrosse, which plays in the Little East Conference (LEC), and sailing, which competes in the New England Intercollegiate Sailing Association (NEISA).

== Background ==
The varsity sports that the Massachusetts Maritime Buccaneers currently offers include baseball, men's and women's crew, men's and women's cross country, football, men's and women's lacrosse, co-ed sailing, men's and women's soccer, softball, men's and women's track & field, and volleyball.

== Sports sponsored ==
Men's sports	Women's sports
Baseball	Cross Country
Cross Country	Lacrosse
Football	Rowing
Lacrosse	Soccer
Rowing	Softball
Soccer	Track and Field †
Track and Field †	Volleyball
Co-ed sports
Sailing
† – Track and field includes both indoor and outdoor

== Championships ==
- 1977 Men's Lacrosse: Won the Colonial League Championship.
- 1977 Football: Won the New England Football Conference (NEFC (now Commonwealth Coast Football)) championship, a school first, finishing the season 8–1.
- 1978 Men's Lacrosse: Won the Colonial League title for the second season in a row.
- 1983 Football: Won the NEFC, second time in seven years, finishing the season 8–2.
- 2001 Sailing: Team won the Intercollegiate Sailing National Championship, the Kennedy Cup, hosted annually in the fall by the United States Naval Academy.
- 2005 Men's Cross Country: The Buccaneers earned the school's first Massachusetts State College Athletic Conference (MASCAC) conference championship in over 20 years.
- 2015 Baseball: Won MASCAC regular season co-championship
- 2018 Baseball: Won MASCAC regular season co-championship
