= Bridgewater State Bears =

- University: Bridgewater State University
- Nickname: Bears
- NCAA: Division III
- Conferences: Massachusetts State Collegiate Athletic Conference (MASCAC): Other conferences: List: Little East Conference (LEC) (men's and women's swimming and diving, men's and women's tennis); New England Wrestling Association (NEWA) (men's wrestling)
- President: Frederick W. Clark
- Athletic director: Dr. Marybeth Lamb
- Location: Bridgewater, Massachusetts
- First year: 1960; 66 years ago
- Varsity teams: 22 (10 men's, 12 women's) (10 men's, 12 women's)
- Football stadium: Peter Mazzaferro Field
- Basketball arena: Adrian Tinsley Center
- Baseball stadium: Alumni Park Baseball Field
- Softball stadium: Alumni Park Softball Field
- Soccer stadium: Peter Mazzaferro Field
- Aquatics center: Dr. Mary Jo Moriarty Pool
- Lacrosse stadium: Peter Mazzaferro Field
- Tennis venue: Rosen Memorial Tennis Courts
- Outdoor track and field venue: Peter Mazzaferro Field & Swenson Track
- Volleyball arena: Adrian Tinsley Center
- Wrestling arena: John J. Kelly Gymnasium
- Colors: Crimson, white, and black
- Mascot: Bristaco the Bear
- Website: www.bsubears.com
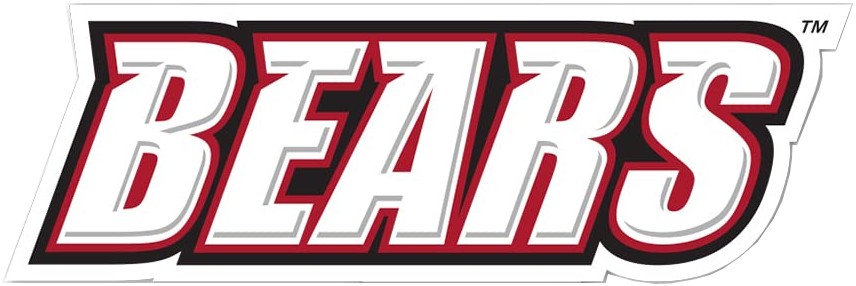

The Bridgewater State Bears are composed of 22 varsity teams representing Bridgewater State University in intercollegiate athletics. All teams compete at the NCAA Division III level and all teams compete in the Massachusetts State Collegiate Athletic Conference (MASCAC), except for field hockey, tennis and swimming & diving which plays in the Little East Conference (LEC).

== Background ==
The intercollegiate athletic program offers 22 varsity teams, including Basketball, Cross Country, Soccer, Swimming and diving, Tennis, Track and field, Baseball, Football, and Wrestling for men. As for the women's sports teams they include Basketball, Cross Country, Equestrian, Soccer, Swimming and diving, Tennis, Track and field, Field hockey, Lacrosse, Softball, and Volleyball.

== Nickname ==
Bridgewater State adopted its mascot the bear in the 1960s, and was decided by a student vote when Bridgewater State brought modern day football to the college. Bridgewater State's mascot is Bristaco the Bear which is named after the former college title. BRIdgewater STAte COllege - BRISTACO Bear. The school colors are crimson, white, and black.

== Sports Sponsored ==
Not only does Bridgewater State University offer intercollegiate athletics, but they also provide Intramural athletic programs, and Club sports program. Such as Cheerleading, several dance teams, Men's Lacrosse, Men's Rugby, Ultimate Frisbee, Soccer, Basketball, etc.

Bridgewater State University athletic performance has gradually improved over the years. The bears won the Smith Trophy for the best overall Athletic Department in the Massachusetts State College Athletic Conference.

In addition to NCAA-sanctioned varsity sports, Bridgewater State supports 9 club sports through Campus Recreation, including cheerleading, dance team, golf, hip-hop/kinetic edge, men's ice hockey, women's ice hockey, men's lacrosse, men's rugby, and men's volleyball.

=== Varsity sports ===
Men's sports	Women's sports
Baseball	Basketball
Basketball	Cross country
Cross country	Equestrian
Football	Field hockey
Soccer	Lacrosse
Swimming & diving	Soccer
Tennis	Softball
Track & field^{1}	Swimming & diving
Wrestling	Tennis
	Track & field^{1}
	Volleyball
^{1} – includes both indoor and outdoor

=== Football ===
The Bridgewater State football team has been one of the most successful athletic teams at the school since the program was started in 1960. Bridgewater State is a member of the MASCAC, which has sponsored football since 2013. Bridgewater State was formerly a founding member of the New England Football Conference from 1965 to 2012. The MASCAC football conference consists of nine schools. These member schools are Bridgewater State University, Fitchburg State University, Framingham State University, Massachusetts Maritime Academy, Westfield State University, Worcester State University, Dean College, Plymouth State University, and UMass-Dartmouth. The team is currently led by head coach Joe Verria.

Listed below are notable awards, accolades, and accomplishments the BSU football team have accumulated since the inception of the program in 1960. The Bears football team have only had two losing seasons since 1985 and have had seven undefeated or 1-loss seasons in that same timeframe.

- NCAA Division III National Tournament Qualifier - 1999, 2000, 2012, 2016
- ECAC Postseason Qualifier - 1989, 1992, 2005, 2006, 2007, 2010, 2011, 2015
- ECAC Northeast Bowl Champions - 2005
- ECAC North Atlantic Bowl Champions - 2006
- NEFC League Champions - 1966, 1969, 1989, 1992, 1997, 1998, 1999, 2000
- MASCAC League Champions - 2016, 2022

=== Women's basketball ===
The Women's basketball team has been a regional power since its debut in 1982. Coach Bridgett Casey coached her 30th season at BSU in 2026-2027. In 2007–2008, Bridgett guided the Bears to a 22–5 (.815) record and the program's first appearance in the NCAA Division III Tournament since 1986. The women's basketball team competes in the (MASCAC) Massachusetts State College Athletic Conference. The Lady Bears' basketball team has qualified for the NCAA D-3 Tournament every year from 2011-2015 as well as the years 2023 and 2025, and are constantly a contender for the MASCAC Championship.

Accomplishments

- MASCAC Champions - 1984–1985, 1985–1986, 2007–2008, 2009–2010, 2011–2012, 2012–2013, 2013-2014, 2014-2015, 2022-2023, 2024-2025
- ECAC Playoff Qualifier - 1987–1988, 2005–2006
- NCAA D-III Qualifier - 1982–1983, 1983–1984, 1984–1985, 1985–1986, 1986–1987, 2007–2008, 2011–2012, 2012–2013, 2013-2014, 2014-2015, 2022-2023, 2024-2025

=== Men's basketball ===
Joe Farroba is the all-time winningest head coach of the Bridgewater State Men's basketball team. "Joe came to Bridgewater State and to the MASCAC as an assistant coach under former BSC Head Coach Mark Champagne in 1986." Coach Farroba took the head coaching job in 1992. Coach Farroba has led the Bears to postseason play eight times, including the NCAA Division III Tournament in 1999, 2006, 2009, 2010 and 2011 (led by Maxwell Dolgin, Center). In 2009 after recording a school record in wins the team received a national ranking for the first time in schools history. That team featured 3 1000 point scorers.

Alumnus Matt McLaughlin is currently the head coach after Farroba's retirement after the 2021-2022 season.

The Men's basketball team also participates in the (MASCAC) Massachusetts State College Athletic Conference, and the NCAA Division III tournament. The Bears basketball team has been one of the most successful teams at Bridgewater in the last 30 years. They have won numerous league and conference championships and made several appearances in the NCAA D-3 National Tournament. They finished under .500 for the first time in ten years in 2012–2013.

Accomplishments

- MASCAC Champions - 2008–2009, 2009–2010, 2017–2018
- ECAC Playoff Qualifier - 1995–1996, 1996–1997, 1997, 1998
- NCAA D-III Qualifier - 1982–1983, 1998–1999, 2005–2006, 2008–2009, 2009–2010, 2010–2011, 2017–2018
- NCAA D-III Sweet Sixteen - 2008-2009

=== Women's lacrosse ===
The Lady Bears' Lacrosse team has statistically been the most successful athletic team in Bridgewater State's history. They have been a dominant women's lacrosse team in the Northeast Region and have won dozens of championships and qualified for numerous NCAA Tournaments. The Lady Bears won the NEWLA regular season and tournament titles for the 7th straight season and advanced to the NCAA Division III Tournament in 2013. The team is led by their head coach Erica Adams.

Accomplishments

- NEWLA Champions - 1999, 2003, 2008, 2009, 2010, 2011, 2012
- ECAC Playoff Qualifier - 1986, 1987, 2000, 2002, 2007, 2008
- MASCAC Champions - 2013, 2014, 2015
- NCAA D-III Qualifier - 2003, 2010, 2011, 2012, 2013, 2014, 2015

=== Baseball ===
The Bridgewater State baseball team has been a dominant force in the New England region for decades. They have made dozens of postseason appearances and won several league and regional championships. They have won the MASCAC Championship every year since 2022, all of which were led by Head Coach Greg Zackrison. Bridgewater State has one of the highest all-time winning percentages (.645) in the country. They have made it to the NCAA D-III World Series 3 times, and have placed in the Elite Eight twice there. They have also produced a handful of Division 3 All-Americans and All-Region players. Below is a list of accomplishments and accolades.

Accomplishments

- MASCAC Champions - 1988, 1989, 1990, 1991, 1992, 1993, 1996, 1997, 1998, 2001, 2003, 2004, 2005, 2006, 2012, 2022, 2023, 2024, 2025, 2026
- ECAC Playoff Qualifier - 1987, 1988, 1993, 1994, 2005
- ECAC Playoff Champions - 1986
- NCAA D-III Qualifier - 1989, 1990, 1991, 1992, 1996, 1997, 2011, 2012, 2022, 2023, 2024, 2025, 2026
- NCAA D-III New England Regional Qualifier - 1996, 1997, 1998, 1999, 2000, 2001, 2003, 2004, 2011, 2012
- NCAA D-III New England Regional Champions - 1996
- NCAA D-III Mid-Atlantic Regional Champions - 1997
- NCAA D-III World Series - 1996 (3rd Place), 1997 (7th Place)

=== Cross Country (Men's) ===
Men's Cross Country in recent years has slowly been building up the program that is now led by Christine Kloiber. The Men have won the Mascac Title in 2019 after a drought of 6 years.

Accomplishments

- MASCAC Champions - 1997, 1998, 2000, 2001, 2010, 2012, 2019, 2022, 2024
- MASCAC Runner Up- 2017,2018

=== Cross Country (Women's) ===
The women's Cross Country team in recent years has lacked squad depth but for the most recent season have gained a lot. The team is also led by Christine Kloiber.

Accomplishments

- MASCAC Champions - 2001, 2002, 2003

=== Swimming and diving ===
The Bridgewater State Swimming and Diving team is successful. They swim Co-Ed, however compete separately. They were formerly part of the NEISDA division and have celebrated 50 years as a program in the Fall of 2020. Both the men's and women's teams have competed in the Little East Conference since 2021-2022. Charlie MacDonald stepped in as the interim head coach in the 2026-27 season after Alumnus Michael Caruso stepped down after 15 seasons. Bridgewater State has a rich history of All-Americans and National Championship qualifiers.

Accomplishments

- Men’s swimming and diving:
  - LEC Champions - 2022, 2023, 2024, 2026
  - ECAC Qualifier - 2025
- Women’s swimming and diving:
  - ECAC Qualifier - 2025
  - NCAA Regional qualifier - 2023, 2024, 2025
  - NCAA National Championship Qualifier - 2025

=== Men's Soccer ===
The Bridgewater State University men's soccer team is led by head coach Brendan Adams, who has recorded over 200 career wins with the program. During his tenure, the Bears have won six MASCAC Tournament championships.

Accomplishments

- MASCAC Champions - 1994, 2003, 2009, 2014, 2023, 2024, 2025
- MASCAC Tournament Champions - 2004, 2007, 2013, 2015, 2018, 2023, 2025
- NCAA Tournament Qualifier - 2004, 2007, 2013, 2015, 2018, 2023, 2025

=== Women's Soccer ===
The Bridgewater State University women's soccer team has been one of the program's most successful athletic teams. The squad is led by their head coach, alumna Yasmina Carvalho, who in 2024 became the winningest head coach in program history. That same year, the Bears ended an 11-year MASCAC Tournament championship drought, capturing their first title and NCAA tournament appearance since 2013.

Accomplishments

- MASCAC Champions - 1993, 1995, 2006, 2008, 2011, 2017, 2023
- MASCAC Tournament Champions - 2002, 2003, 2013, 2024
- NCAA Tournament Qualifier - 2002, 2003, 2013, 2024

== Club Sports ==
- Men's Ice Hockey
- Women's Ice Hockey
- Men's Lacrosse
- Men's Rugby
- Men's Volleyball
- Coed Cheerleading
- Coed Dance
- Coed Golf
- Coed Hip Hop/Kinetic Edge dance

=== Cheerleading ===
The Bridgewater State University cheerleading team operates as a club sport program under the jurisdiction of the university's Campus Recreation department. The program supports both a co-educational squad and an all-female squad, commonly designated as the "Grey" and "Red" teams, which split duties between supporting varsity athletic events and training for national-level competitions.

The Bears compete annually at the National Cheerleaders Association (NCA) Collegiate National Championships held in Daytona Beach, Florida. Under the direction of long-time head coach Jason Manhart, the program has established itself as a national powerhouse within Division III, frequently ranking among the top scoring collegiate programs across all divisions. In addition to competitive routines, the squads provide sideline support at home football and basketball games throughout the academic year.

Accomplishments

- National Championships
  - Intermediate Small Coed Division III - 2021, 2023, 2024
  - Advanced All-Girl Division III - 2011, 2014, 2019, 2021, 2022
