= List of colleges and universities in Illinois =

The following is a list of colleges and universities in Illinois.

== Public institutions ==
=== Four-year institutions ===
School	Location(s)	Founded	Enrollment (Fall 2024)	Type	Notes
Chicago State University	Chicago	1867	2,238	Master's	
Eastern Illinois University	Charleston	1895	8,505	Master's	
Governors State University	University Park	1969	4,397	Master's	
Illinois State University	Normal	1857	21,546	Research University	
University of Illinois Chicago	Chicago	1965	33,906	Research University	Part of the University of Illinois system
University of Illinois Springfield	Springfield	1969	4,628	Master's	Part of the University of Illinois system
University of Illinois Urbana-Champaign	Urbana, Champaign	1867	59,238	Research University	Part of the University of Illinois system
Northeastern Illinois University	Chicago	1867	5,734	Master's	
Northern Illinois University	DeKalb	1895	15,414	Research University	
Southern Illinois University Carbondale	Carbondale	1869	11,790	Research University	Part of the Southern Illinois University System
Southern Illinois University Edwardsville	Edwardsville	1957	11,893	Doctoral/Professional University	Part of the Southern Illinois University System
Western Illinois University	Macomb	1899	6,332	Research University	

== Private institutions ==
=== Non-profit ===
School	Location(s)	Founded	Enrollment (Fall 2024)	Type
Adler University	Chicago	1952	1,631	Special-focus
American Islamic College	Chicago	1983	29	Faith-related
Augustana College	Rock Island	1860	2,570	Baccalaureate
Aurora University	Aurora	1893	5,923	Doctoral/Professional
Benedictine University	Lisle	1887	2,917	Master's
Bexley Hall Seabury Western Theologoical Seminary Federation	Chicago	1824	80	Faith-related
Blackburn College	Carlinville	1837	513	Baccalaureate
Blessing-Rieman College of Nursing and Health Sciences	Quincy	1891	193	Special-focus
Bradley University	Peoria	1897	4,777	Doctoral/Professional
CAAN Academy of Nursing	Matteson	2007	96	Special-focus
Catholic Theological Union	Chicago	1968	210	Faith-related
Chicago Theological Seminary	Chicago	1855	215	Faith-related
Columbia College Chicago	Chicago	1890	5,570	Master's
Concordia University Chicago	River Forest	1864	4,770	Doctoral/Professional
DePaul University	Chicago	1898	21,210	Research University
Dominican University	River Forest	1901	3,803	Master's
East–West University	Chicago	1980	468	Baccalaureate
Elmhurst University	Elmhurst	1871	3,997	Master's
Erikson Institute	Chicago	1966	297	Master's
Eureka College	Eureka	1855	527	Baccalaureate
Garrett-Evangelical Theological Seminary	Evanston	1853	313	Faith-related
Generations College	Chicago	1904	310	Two-year College
Greenville University	Greenville	1892	1,104	Master's
Hebrew Theological College	Skokie	1921	182	Faith-related
Illinois College	Jacksonville	1829	942	Baccalaureate
Illinois College of Optometry	Chicago	1872	474	Special-focus
Illinois Institute of Technology	Chicago	1890	8,834	Research University
Illinois Wesleyan University	Bloomington	1850	1,582	Baccalaureate
Institute for Clinical Social Work	Chicago	1981	121	Special-focus
Judson University	Elgin, Rockford	1913	960	Master's
Knox College	Galesburg	1837	1,136	Baccalaureate
Lake Forest College	Lake Forest	1857	1,837	Baccalaureate
Lakeview College of Nursing	Danville	1894	66	Special-focus
Lewis University	Romeoville	1932	7,011	Master's
Loyola University Chicago	Chicago	1870	17,384	Research University
Lutheran School of Theology at Chicago	Chicago	1962	101	Faith-related
McCormick Theological Seminary	Chicago	1829	125	Faith-related
McKendree University	Lebanon	1828	2,392	Master's
Meadville Lombard Theological School	Chicago	1844	62	Faith-related
Methodist College	Peoria	2008	267	Special-focus
Midwestern University	Downers Grove	1900	2,567	Graduate School
Millikin University	Decatur	1901	1,586	Baccalaureate
Monmouth College	Monmouth	1853	713	Baccalaureate
Moody Bible Institute	Chicago	1886	2,202	Faith-related
Morrison Institute of Technology	Morrison	1973	59	Special-focus
National Louis University	Chicago	1886	8,915	Doctoral/Professional
National University of Health Sciences	Lombard	1906	511	Special-focus
North Central College	Naperville	1861	3,003	Master's
North Park University	Chicago	1891	2,557	Master's
Northern Seminary	Lisle	1913	315	Faith-related
Northwestern University	Evanston	1851	23,856	Research University
Olivet Nazarene University	Bourbonnais	1907	3,339	Master's
Principia College	Elsah	1912	339	Baccalaureate
Quincy University	Quincy	1860	1,210	Baccalaureate
Rockford University	Rockford	1847	1,241	Master's
Roosevelt University	Chicago, Schaumburg	1945	4,281	Doctoral/Professional
Rosalind Franklin University of Medicine and Science	North Chicago	1912	2,021	Special-focus
Rush University	Chicago	1972	2,769	Special-focus
Saint Anthony College of Nursing	Rockford	1915	263	Special-focus
Saint Francis Medical Center College of Nursing	Peoria	1985	605	Special-focus
Saint Xavier University	Chicago	1846	3,485	Master's
School of the Art Institute of Chicago	Chicago	1866	3,394	Special-focus
Spertus Institute for Jewish Learning and Leadership	Chicago	1924	89	Faith-related
St. John's College of Nursing	Springfield	1886	132	Special-focus
Telshe Yeshiva	Chicago	1960	91	Faith-related
The Chicago School	Chicago	1979	1,100	Special-focus
Toyota Technological Institute at Chicago	Chicago	2003	39	Special-focus
Trinity College of Nursing and Health Sciences	Rock Island	1898	65	Special-focus
Trinity International University	Bannockburn	1897	869	Doctoral/Professional
University of Chicago	Chicago	1890	18,566	Research University
University of Saint Mary of the Lake	Mundelein	1844	200	Faith-related
University of St. Francis	Joliet	1920	3,074	Doctoral/Professional
VanderCook College of Music	Chicago	1909	323	Special-focus
Wheaton College	Wheaton	1860	2,874	Baccalaureate

=== For-profit ===
School	Location(s)	Founded	Enrollment (Fall 2024)
Chamberlain University	Chicago	1889	32,944
DeVry University	Downers Grove	1931	31,296
Fox College	Tinley Park	1932	200
Lincoln Tech	Melrose Park	1946	1,539
Midwest College of Oriental Medicine	Skokie	1979	30
Midwestern Career College	Chicago	2004	887
Pacific College of Health and Science	Chicago	1986	245
Rasmussen University	Aurora, Rockford, Mokena and Tinley Park	1900	1,145
Stautzenberger College-Rockford Career College	Rockford	1862	682
Taylor Business Institute	Chicago	1962	115
Worsham College of Mortuary Science	Wheeling	1911	183

== Endowments ==
Illinois Educational Institutions with Endowments >$100M (2025 data)
Institution	Endowment (millions)
Northwestern University	$15,168
University of Chicago	$10,621
University of Illinois system (U. of I. and Foundation)	$3,798
School of the Art Institute of Chicago	$1,598
Loyola University Chicago	$1,177
DePaul University	$1,153
Principia College (The Principia Corporation, Mo.)	$963
Rush University	$929
Midwestern University	$917
Wheaton College	$672
Bradley University	$394
Augustana College	$253
Illinois State University	$246
Southern Illinois University Carbondale	$228
Elmhurst University	$194
North Central College	$153
Eastern Illinois University	$140
Illinois College	$133
Northern Illinois University	$123
North Park University	$114

== Defunct institutions ==
- Abingdon College (1853–1888), in Abingdon, merged with Eureka College in 1885, campus closed in 1888
- Argosy University (2001–2019, Chicago, Schaumburg)
- Barat College (1858–2005), in Lake Forest, became a part of DePaul University in 2001. Barat campus closed in 2005.
- Brown's Business College (1876–1994), numerous locations around Illinois
- Coyne College (1899–2022, Chicago)
- Dixon College (1881–c. 1915, Dixon)
- Evanston College for Ladies (1871–1873), merged with Northwestern University in 1873
- Flashpoint Chicago (2007–2022), in Chicago
- Hedding College (1855–1927), in Abingdon, absorbed by Illinois Wesleyan University in 1930
- Hillsboro College (1847–1852), in Hillsboro, moved to Springfield in 1852 as Illinois State University (1852–1870), moved to Carthage in 1870 and became Carthage College
- Illinois Institute of Art – Chicago (1916–2018, Chicago)
- Illinois Institute of Art – Schaumburg (1983–2018), in Schaumburg
- International Academy of Design & Technology – Schaumburg (1977–2015)
- ITT Technical Institute (1969–2016, Arlington Heights, Oak Brook, Orland Park)
- Jubilee College (1839–1862), near Brimfield
- Judson College (1846–1860), in Mount Palatine
- Kendall College (1934–2018), started in Evanston and moved to Chicago, merged with National Louis University
- Lake Forest Graduate School of Management (1946–2026), in Lake Forest
- Lexington College (1977–2014), in Chicago
- Lincoln Christian University (1944–2024), in Lincoln
- Lincoln College (1865–2022), in Lincoln
- Lombard College (1853–1930), in Galesburg, after closing many students went to Knox College
- MacMurray College (1846–2020), in Jacksonville
- Mallinckrodt College (1916–1991, Wilmette), merged with Loyola University Chicago
- Midstate College (~1888–2019), in Peoria
- Midwest College of Engineering (1967–1986), merged with Illinois Institute of Technology in 1986.
- Morthland College (2009–2018, West Frankfort)
- Mount Morris College (1879–1932), in Mount Morris
- Mundelein College (1930-1991), in Chicago, merged with Loyola University Chicago
- University of Nauvoo (1841–1845), in Nauvoo
- Northwestern College (1902–2024), in Oak Lawn
- Oak Point University (1914–2024), in Chicago
- Oregon Bible College (1939–1991), in Oregon
- Robert Morris University Illinois (1913–2020), Chicago, merged with Roosevelt University.
- Shimer College (1853–2017, Mount Carroll, Waukegan, Chicago), merged with North Central College in Naperville in 2017
- Sparks College (1908–2009), in Shelbyville
- Solex College (1995–2018, Chicago, Wheeling)
- St. Augustine College (Illinois) (1980–2023), in Chicago; merged with Lewis University
- St. Viator College (1865–1939), in Bourbonnais
- Shurtleff College (1827–1957), in Alton, was absorbed by Southern Illinois University when its campus became the SIU Alton Residence Center, one of the two precursors of Southern Illinois University Edwardsville. The campus now houses the School of Dental Medicine.
- State Community College of East Saint Louis (1969–1999), replaced by Metropolitan Community College around 1995, which was closed in 1999
- Trinity Christian College (1959–2026, Palos Heights)
- Vatterott College (1995–2018, Quincy, Fairview Heights)
- Westwood College (1953–2016), Calumet City, Chicago, Woodridge
- William & Vashti College (1908–1918), in Aledo

== See also ==
- List of college athletic programs in Illinois
- Higher education in the United States
- List of colleges and universities in Chicago
- List of recognized higher education accreditation organizations
- Lists of American institutions of higher education
- Illinois Veteran Grant
