= List of nursing schools in Europe =

This is a list of nursing schools in the continent of Europe, sorted by country. A nursing school is a school that teaches people how to be nurses (medical professionals who care for individuals, families, or communities in order to reach or maintain health and quality of life).

== Finland ==
- LAB University of Applied Sciences
- Novia University of Applied Sciences
- Swedish Polytechnic
- Lapland University of Applied Sciences
- Satakunta University of Applied Sciences
- JAMK University of Applied Sciences
- Savonia University of Applied Sciences

== Italy ==
- D'Annunzio University of Chieti–Pescara
- Humanitas University
- Marche Polytechnic University
- Magna Græcia University
- Saint Camillus International University of Health and Medical Sciences
- Vita-Salute San Raffaele University
- Sapienza University of Rome
- Università Cattolica del Sacro Cuore
- University of Bari
- University of Bologna
- University of Brescia
- University of Cagliari
- Università degli Studi della Campania Luigi Vanvitelli
- Università Campus Bio-Medico
- University of Eastern Piedmont
- University of Ferrara
- University of Florence
- Università degli studi di Foggia
- University of Insubria
- University of L'Aquila
- University of Messina
- University of Milan
- University of Milano-Bicocca
- University of Modena and Reggio Emilia
- University of Molise
- University of Naples Federico II
- University of Padua
- University of Palermo
- University of Parma
- University of Pavia
- University of Perugia
- University of Pisa
- University of Rome Tor Vergata
- University of Salerno
- University of Sassari
- University of Siena
- University of Trieste
- University of Turin
- University of Udine
- University of Verona

== Poland ==
- University of Economics and Innovation Lublin
- Vincent Pol University in Lublin
- Polonia University
- Nicolaus Copernicus University
- Cardinal Stefan Wyszyński University in Warsaw
- Białystok Institute of Cosmetology
- Faculty of Health Sciences and Physical Culture of Kazimierz Pułaski University of Technology and Humanities in Radom

== Portugal ==
- Escola Superior de Enfermagem de Lisboa
- Escola Superior de Enfermagem de Porto
- Escola Superior de Enfermagem de Coimbra
- Portuguese Red Cross Higher School of Nursing – Alto Tamega
- School of Nursing S. Francisco das Misericordias

== Spain ==
- Comillas Pontifical University
- University of Barcelona
- University of Granada
- University of Salamanca
- University of Murcia
- University of Léon

== Sweden ==
- Karolinska Institute
- University of Gothenburg
- Swedish Red Cross University College
- Malardalen University
- Karlstad University
- Lund University
- Red Cross University College of Nursing (Stockholm)
- Uppsala University (Uppsala, Visby)

== Turkey ==
- Acıbadem University
- Atılım University
- Ankara University
- Bahçeşehir University
- Başkent University
- Dokuz Eylül University
- Ege University
- Gazi University
- Hacettepe University
- Istanbul Bilgi University
- Istanbul Medipol University
- Istanbul University-Cerrahpaşa
- Koç University
- Marmara University
- Yeditepe University

== United Kingdom ==
=== England ===
- Florence Nightingale Faculty of Nursing and Midwifery
- School of Health Sciences, City, University of London
- City, University of London
- Anglia Ruskin University
- Birmingham City University
- Bournemouth University (Poole)
- Brunel University London
- Buckinghamshire New University
- Canterbury Christ Church University
- Cardiff University
- Coventry University
- De Montfort University
- Edge Hill University (Ormskirk)
- Imperial College London
- Keele University
- Kingston University
- Leeds Beckett University
- Liverpool John Moores University
- London South Bank University
- Manchester Metropolitan University
- Middlesex University
- Northumbria University
- Nottingham Trent University
- Sheffield Hallam University
- Solent University
- Staffordshire University
- Teesside University
- Thames Valley University
- Oxford Brookes University
- University College Birmingham
- University of Bedfordshire
- University of Birmingham
- University of Bradford
- University of Brighton
- University of Bristol
- University of Central Lancashire
- University of Chester
- University of Chichester
- University of Cumbria
- University of Derby
- University of East Anglia
- University of East London
- University of Essex
- University of Exeter
- University of Gloucestershire
- University of Greenwich
- University of Hertfordshire
- University of Huddersfield
- University of Hull
- University of Leeds
- University of Leicester
- University of Lincoln
- University of Liverpool
- University of Manchester
- University of Northampton
- University of Nottingham
- University of Plymouth
- University of Portsmouth
- University of Roehampton
- University of Salford
- University of Sheffield
- University of Southampton
- University of Suffolk
- University of Sunderland
- University of Surrey
- University of West London
- University of Winchester
- University of Wolverhampton
- University of Worcester
- University of the West of England, Bristol
- University of York
- [[York St John University|York St John University]]

=== Northern Ireland ===
- Queen's University Belfast
- Ulster University

=== Scotland ===
- Abertay University (Dundee)
- Edinburgh Napier University
- Glasgow Caledonian University
- Queen Margaret University
- Robert Gordon University
- Teesside University
- University of Dundee
- Nursing Studies, University of Edinburgh
- University of Glasgow
- University of Stirling
- University of the Highlands and Islands
- University of the West of Scotland
- Queen Margaret Hospital
- University of Edinburgh

=== Wales ===
- Aberystwyth University
- Bangor University
- Cardiff University
- Swansea University
- University of South Wales
- Wrexham Glyndŵr University

== See also ==
- List of nursing schools in the United States
- List of nursing schools in Malaysia
