= List of nursing schools in the United States =

This is a list of nursing schools in the United States, sorted by state. A nursing school is a school that teaches people how to be nurses (medical professionals who care for individuals, families, or communities in order to attain or maintain health and quality of life).

== Alabama ==
School	City	Type
Auburn University	Auburn	
Auburn University at Montgomery	Montgomery	
Bevill State Community College	Jasper	Public
Bishop State Community College	Mobile	Public
Calhoun Community College	Decatur	Public
Central Alabama Community College	Childersburg	Public
Chattahoochee Valley Community College	Phenix City	Public
Coastal Alabama Community College	Monroeville	Public
Faulkner State Community College	Bay Minette	Public
Fortis College	Montgomery	
Gadsden State Community College	Gadsden	Public
Herzing University	Birmingham	
ITT Technical Institute	Birmingham, Madison, Mobile	
Jacksonville State University College of Nursing	Jacksonville	Public
Jefferson Davis Community College	Brewton	Public
Jefferson State Community College	Birmingham	Public
Judson College	Marion	
Lawson State Community College	Birmingham	Public
Lurleen B. Wallace Community College	Opp	Public
Northeast Alabama Community College	Rainsville	Public
Northwest Shoals Community College	Campbell	Public
Oakwood University	Huntsville	
Samford University	Birmingham	
Shelton State Community College	Tuscaloosa	Public
Snead State Community College	Boaz	Public
South University	Montgomery	
Southern Union State Community College	Opelika	Public
Spring Hill College	Mobile	
Troy University School of Nursing	Troy, Montgomery	
Tuskegee University	Tuskegee	
University of Alabama	Tuscaloosa	
University of Alabama at Birmingham School of Nursing	Birmingham	
University of Alabama in Huntsville College of Nursing	Huntsville	
University of Mobile	Mobile	
University of North Alabama College of Nursing and Allied Health	Florence	
University of South Alabama College of Nursing	Mobile	
University of West Alabama School of Nursing	Livingston	
Virginia College	Birmingham, Montgomery, Mobile	
Wallace Community College	Dothan	Public
Wallace State Community College	Hanceville	Public
Wallace Community College Selma	Selma	Public

== Alaska ==
- University of Alaska Anchorage School of Nursing, Anchorage

== Arizona ==
- Arizona College, Mesa
- Arizona State University, Phoenix
- Arizona Western College, Yuma
- Brookline College, Phoenix, Tempe, Tucson
- Brown Mackie College, Phoenix
- Carrington College, Phoenix
- Central Arizona College, Coolidge
- Chamberlain College of Nursing, Phoenix
- Chandler-Gilbert Community College, Chandler
- Cochise Community College, Sierra Vista
- Coconino Community College, Flagstaff
- Eastern Arizona College, Thatcher
- Estrella Mountain Community College, Avondale
- Everest College, Phoenix
- GateWay Community College, Phoenix
- Glendale Community College, Glendale
- Grand Canyon University, Phoenix
- ITT Technical Institute, Phoenix
- Mesa Community College, Mesa
- Mohave Community College, Lake Havasu City
- Northern Arizona University, Flagstaff
- Northland Pioneer College, Holbrook
- Paradise Valley Community College, Phoenix
- Phoenix College, Phoenix
- Pima Community College, Tucson
- Pima Medical Institute, Mesa and Tucson
- Scottsdale Community College, Scottsdale
- University of Arizona, Tucson
- University of Phoenix, Phoenix
- Yavapai College, Prescott

== Arkansas ==
- Arkansas State University School of Nursing, Jonesboro
- Baptist Health School of Nursing, Little Rock
- Jefferson Regional Medical Center School of Nursing, Pine Bluff
- Southeast Arkansas College Allied Health & Nursing, Pine Bluff
- University of Arkansas at Monticello, Monticello
- University of Arkansas at Pine Bluff School of Nursing, Pine Bluff
- University of Arkansas for Medical Sciences College of Nursing, Little Rock
- University of Central Arkansas, Conway

== California ==
- American National University, eUniversity California
- American University of Health Sciences, Signal Hill, California
- Azusa Pacific University School of Nursing, Azusa
- California Baptist University College of Nursing, Riverside
- California State University, Bakersfield Department of Nursing, Bakersfield
- California State University, Chico
- California State University, Dominguez Hills School of Nursing, Carson
- California State University, East Bay
- California State University, Fresno
- California State University, Fullerton School of Nursing, Fullerton
- California State University, Long Beach School of Nursing, Long Beach
- California State University, Los Angeles School of Nursing, Los Angeles
- California State University, Northridge
- California State University, Sacramento
- California State University, San Bernardino Department of Nursing, San Bernardino
- California State University, Stanislaus
- Chaffey College Nursing Program, Rancho Cucamonga
- Chamberlain University, Rancho Cordova, California
- East Los Angeles Community College, Monterey Park
- Glendale Community College, Glendale
- Loma Linda University School of Nursing, Loma Linda
- Los Angeles City College, Los Angeles
- Los Angeles County College of Nursing and Allied Health, Los Angeles
- Los Angeles Trade Technical College, Los Angeles
- Mount St. Mary's College Department of Nursing, Los Angeles
- Mount San Antonio College, Walnut
- Pasadena City College, Pasadena
- Rio Hondo College, Whittier
- Riverside City College School of Nursing, Riverside
- Samuel Merritt University, Oakland
- San Bernardino Valley College Nursing Department, San Bernardino
- San Diego State University College of Health & Human Services School of Nursing, San Diego
- San Francisco State University
- San José State University
- Sonoma State University, Rohnert Park
- Unitek College, Bakersfield, Concord, Fremont, Hayward, Ontario, Sacramento, San Jose, South San Francisco
- University of California, Davis School of Nursing, Sacramento
- University of California, Irvine Sue and Bill Gross School of Nursing
- University of California, Los Angeles School of Nursing, Los Angeles
- University of California, San Francisco School of Nursing, San Francisco
- University of San Francisco
- University of Southern California Keck School of Medicine
- Victor Valley College, Victorville
- West Coast University
- West Hills College Lemoore, Lemoore
- Western University of Health Sciences College of Graduate Nursing, Pomona

== Colorado ==
- Adams State University, Alamosa
- American National University, eUniversity Colorado
- Beth-El College of Nursing & Health Sciences, Colorado Springs
- Colorado State University–Pueblo
- Denver College of Nursing, Denver
- Regis University, Denver
- University of Colorado Denver College of Nursing, Aurora
- University of Northern Colorado, Greeley

== Connecticut ==
- American National University, eUniversity Connecticut
- Central Connecticut State University, New Britain
- Fairfield University School of Nursing, Fairfield
- Quinnipiac University, Hamden
- Sacred Heart University, Fairfield
- St. Vincent's College, Bridgeport
- Southern Connecticut State University, New Haven
- University of Connecticut School of Nursing, Storrs
- University of Saint Joseph, West Hartford
- Western Connecticut State University, Danbury
- Yale School of Nursing, New Haven

=== Defunct in Connecticut ===
- Bridgeport Hospital School of Nursing

== Delaware ==
- Beebe School of Nursing, Lewes
- Delaware State University, Dover
- Delaware Technical Community College, Georgetown, Dover, and Stanton
- University of Delaware, Newark

== Florida ==
- Adventist University of Health Sciences, Orlando
- American National University, eUniversity Florida
- Barry University (BSN), Miami Shores
- Elite Medical Academy
- Florida Atlantic University (BSN, MSN, DNP, & Ph.D.), Boca Raton
- Florida Education Institute (ASN, LPN), Miami
- Florida International University (BSN), University Park
- Hillsborough Community College (ADN), Hillsborough County
- Jacksonville University (BSN, MSN), Jacksonville
- Keiser University (ADN), Jacksonville and multiple other campuses
- Mercy Hospital College of Nursing (ASN), Miami
- Nova Southeastern University (BSN, MSN), Davie
- Polk State College (ADN), Winter Haven
- Rasmussen College (ADN, BSN), Fort Myers
- Santa Fe College (ASN, RN-BSN), Gainesville
- State College of Florida, Manatee-Sarasota, (ASN, BSN), Bradenton
- St. Johns River State College (ASN), Orange Park and Palatka
- St. Petersburg College (BSN), St. Petersburg
- Southwest Florida Technical Institute (CNA, LPN, RN, BSN), Bradenton
- South University (BSN), Tampa and West Palm Beach
- University of Central Florida (BSN), Orlando
- University of Florida College of Nursing (BSN, RN-BSN, MSN, DNP, and Ph.D.), Gainesville
- University of Miami (BSN, MSN, DNP, Ph.D.), Coral Gables
- University of South Florida (BSN, MSN), Tampa
- University of Tampa (BSN, MSN), Tampa
- University of West Florida (BSN), Pensacola
- Utica University (accelerated BSN), St. Petersburg

== Georgia ==
- Abraham Baldwin Agricultural College Division of Nursing and Health Sciences, Tifton
- Albany State University Darton College of Health Professions, Albany
- Armstrong Atlantic State University Department of Nursing, Savannah
- Athens Technical College Associate Degree Nursing Program, Athens
- Augusta State University Department of Nursing, Augusta
- Brenau University Department of Nursing, Gainesville
- Clayton State University School of Health Sciences Department of Nursing, Morrow
- Coastal Georgia Community College Department of Nursing, Brunswick
- Columbus State University Department of Nursing, Columbus
- Columbus Technical College Associate Degree Nursing, Columbus
- Dalton State College Nursing Department, Dalton
- Emory University, Nell Hodgson Woodruff School of Nursing, Atlanta
- Floyd College Division of Nursing Education, Rome
- Georgia Baptist College of Nursing of Mercer University, Atlanta
- Georgia College and State University School of Health Sciences, Milledgeville
- Georgia Gwinnett College School of Health Sciences, Lawrenceville
- Georgia Perimeter College Associate Degree Nursing Department, Clarkston
- Georgia Regents University College of Nursing, Augusta (satellite campuses in Athens and Columbus)
- Georgia Southern University School of Nursing, Statesboro
- Georgia Southwestern State University School of Nursing, Americus
- Georgia State University, Byrdine F. Lewis School of Nursing and Health Professions, Atlanta
- Gordon College Division of Nursing and Health Sciences, Barnesville
- Kennesaw State University Wellstar School of Nursing, Kennesaw
- LaGrange College Division of Nursing, LaGrange
- Middle Georgia State University Department of Nursing, Cochran and Division of Nursing, Macon
- North Georgia College and State University Department of Nursing, Dahlonega
- Northwestern Technical College Associate Degree Nursing Program, Rock Spring
- Piedmont University R. H. Daniel School of Nursing, Demorest
- South Georgia College Division of Nursing, Douglas
- Southwest Georgia Technical College Associate Degree Nursing Program, Thomasville
- Thomas University Department of Nursing, Thomasville
- University of Georgia Ivester School of Nursing, Athens
- University of West Georgia Department of Nursing, Carrollton
- Valdosta State University College of Nursing, Valdosta
- West Central Technical College Associate Degree Nursing Program, Waco

== Hawaii ==
- Chaminade University of Honolulu School of Nursing, Honolulu
- Hawaii Community College Division of Nursing and Allied Health, Hilo
- Hawaii Pacific University, Honolulu
- Kapiʻolani Community College Nursing Program, Honolulu]
- Kauaʻi Community College Nursing Program, Līhu'e
- Maui Community College Nursing Career Ladder, Kahului

== Idaho ==
- Boise State University, Boise
- Brigham Young University–Idaho, Rexburg
- College of Eastern Idaho, Idaho Falls, Idaho
- College of Southern Idaho, Twin Falls
- College of Western Idaho, Nampa, Idaho
- Idaho State University, Pocatello
- Lewis–Clark State College, Lewiston
- North Idaho College, Coeur d' Alene, Idaho

=== Defunct in Idaho ===
- Saint Joseph Hospital School of Nursing

== Illinois ==
- ATS Institute of Technology, Chicago
- Aurora University, Aurora
- Blessing-Rieman College of Nursing and Health Sciences, Quincy
- Bradley University, Peoria
- Capitol Area School of Nursing, Springfield
- Chamberlain College of Nursing, Downers Grove, Illinois
- DePaul University Department of Nursing, Chicago
- Elgin Community College Nursing Program, Elgin
- Graham Hospital School of Nursing, Canton
- Harper College Nursing Program, Palatine
- Harry S Truman College, Chicago
- Heartland Community College, Bloomington
- Lewis University Online, Romeoville
- Loyola University Chicago
- Mennonite College of Nursing at Illinois State University, Normal
- Millikin University, Decatur
- North Park University, Chicago
- Northbrook College of Health Care, Wheeling
- Northern Illinois University, DeKalb
- Omega Health Care Technical School, Evanston
- PCCTI, Chicago
- Prairie State College, Chicago Heights
- Resurrection University, Chicago
- Richland Community College, Decatur
- Saint Anthony College of Nursing, Rockford
- Saint Francis Medical Center College of Nursing, Peoria
- Saint Xavier University, Chicago
- St. John's College of Nursing, Springfield
- South Suburban College, South Holland
- Southern Illinois University Edwardsville, Edwardsville
- Trinity College of Nursing and Health Sciences, Rock Island
- University of Illinois at Chicago

== Indiana ==
- Ball State University School of Nursing, Muncie
- Goshen College Nursing Department, Goshen
- Indiana State University, Terre Haute
- Indiana University Bloomington
- Indiana University, Kokomo
- Indiana University East, Richmond
- Indiana University Northwest, Gary
- Indiana University-Purdue University, Indianapolis
- Marian University School of Nursing, Indianapolis
- Purdue University, West Lafayette
- Saint Mary's College Nursing School, Notre Dame
- University of Indianapolis School of Nursing, Indianapolis
- University of Southern Indiana College of Nursing, Evansville
- Valparaiso University College of Nursing, Valparaiso
- University of Saint Francis School of Nursing, Fort Wayne

== Iowa ==
- Allen College School of Nursing, Waterloo
- Des Moines Area Community College School of Nursing, Ankeny
- Luther College Nursing Program, Decorah
- Mercy College of Health Sciences College of Nursing, Des Moines
- Signature Healthcare, Des Moines
- University of Iowa College of Nursing, Iowa City

== Kansas ==
- Baker University School of Nursing, Baldwin City
- Barton Community College, Great Bend
- Benedictine College, Department of Nursing, Atchison
- Bethel College, North Newton
- Butler Community College, El Dorado
- Cloud County Community College, Nursing Department, Concordia
- Coffeyville Community College, Coffeyville
- Colby Community College, Department of Nursing, Colby
- Dodge City Community College, Dodge City
- Donnelly College, Kansas City
- Emporia State University, Department of Nursing, Emporia
- Fort Hays State University, Department of Nursing, Hays
- Fort Scott Community College, Nursing Department, Fort Scott
- Garden City Community College, Garden City
- Hesston College, Hesston
- Highland Community College Technical Center, Atchison
- Hutchinson Community College, Hutchinson
- Johnson County Community College School of Nursing, Overland Park
- Kansas City Kansas Community College, Division of Allied Health & Nursing, Kansas City
- Kansas Wesleyan University, Division of Nursing Education and Health Science, Salina
- Labette Community College, Nursing Department, Parsons
- Manhattan Area Technical College, Manhattan
- MidAmerica Nazarene University, School of Nursing, Olathe
- Neosho County Community College, Mary Grimes School of Nursing, Chanute and Ottawa
- Newman University, School of Nursing and Allied Health, Wichita
- North Central Kansas Technical College, Hays
- Ottawa University, RN to BSN, Ottawa
- Pittsburg State University School of Nursing, Pittsburg
- Pratt Community College, Pratt
- Rasmussen University, Overland Park
- Salina Area Technical College, Salina
- Seward County Community College, Liberal
- Southwestern College Professional Studies, RN to BSN, Wichita
- University of Kansas School of Nursing, Kansas City
- University of Saint Mary, Division of Nursing, Leavenworth
- Washburn University School of Nursing, Topeka
- Wichita State University School of Nursing, Wichita

== Kentucky ==
- American National University, Pikeville
- University of Pikeville, Pikeville
- Big Sandy Community and Technical College, Prestonsburg
- Galen College of Nursing, Louisville
- Northern Kentucky University Department of Nursing, Highland Heights
- Eastern Kentucky University Department of Nursing, Richmond
- Spalding University School of Nursing, Louisville
- University of Kentucky College of Nursing, Lexington
- University of Louisville School of Nursing, Louisville
- Western Kentucky University Department of Nursing, Bowling Green

== Louisiana ==
- Baton Rouge Community College, Baton Rouge
- Baton Rouge General Hospital School of Nursing (Diploma in Nursing), Baton Rouge
- Bossier Parish Community College, Bossier City
- Delgado Community College Charity Hospital School of Nursing (now called Charity-Delgado) (ADN), New Orleans
- Dillard University Division of Nursing (BSN), New Orleans
- Fletcher Technical Community College, Houma
- Grambling State University School of Nursing (BSN, MSN), Grambling
- Louisiana Christian University Division of Nursing, Pineville
- Louisiana Delta Community College, Monroe
- Louisiana State University at Alexandria, Alexandria
- Louisiana State University at Eunice School of Nursing (ADN), Eunice
- Louisiana State University Health Science Center, School of Nursing, New Orleans
- Louisiana Tech University, Ruston
- Loyola University School of Nursing (BSN, MSN), New Orleans
- McNeese State University College of Nursing (BSN, MSN), Lake Charles
- Nicholls State University, Thibodaux
- Northwestern State University College of Nursing, Natchitoches and Shreveport
- Our Lady of Holy Cross College School of Nursing, New Orleans
- Our Lady of the Lake University, Baton Rouge
- Southeastern Louisiana University School of Nursing, Hammond
- Southern University and A&M College, Baton Rouge
- Southern University at Shreveport School of Nursing, Shreveport
- University of Louisiana at Lafayette School of Nursing, Lafayette
- University of Louisiana at Monroe School of Nursing, Monroe
- William Carey University, Joseph and Nancy Fail School of Nursing, New Orleans

== Maine ==
- Central Maine Community College, Auburn
- Central Maine Medical Center College of Nursing and Health Professions, Lewiston
- Eastern Maine Community College, Bangor
- Husson University, Bangor
- Kennebec Valley Community College, Fairfield
- Maine College of Health Professions, Lewiston
- Northern Maine Community College, Presque Isle
- Saint Joseph's College of Maine, Standish
- Southern Maine Community College, South Portland
- University of Maine School of Nursing, Orono
- University of Maine at Augusta, Augusta
- University of Maine at Fort Kent, Fort Kent
- University of New England, Biddeford and Portland
- University of Southern Maine School of Nursing, Portland and Lewiston

== Maryland ==
Bachelor's degree programs or higher:

- Bowie State University Bachelor's degree Nursing Program, Bowie
- Coppin State University Bachelor's degree Nursing Program, Baltimore
- Hood College, Bachelor's degree Nursing Program, Frederick
- Johns Hopkins School of Nursing Second Degree Bachelor/Master/Doctorate Degree Nursing Program, Baltimore
- Morgan State University Bachelor's degree Nursing Program, Baltimore
- Notre Dame of Maryland University Bachelor's degree Nursing Program, Baltimore
- Salisbury University Bachelor/Master's degree Nursing Program, Salisbury
- Stevenson University Bachelor/Master's degree Nursing Program, Stevenson
- Towson University Bachelor/Master's degree Nursing Program, Towson
- University of Maryland at Baltimore Bachelor/Master/Doctorate Degree Nursing Program, Baltimore
- Washington Adventist University Bachelor's degree Nursing Program, Takoma Park

Associate degree programs:

- Allegany College of Maryland, Associate Degree Nursing Program, Cumberland
- Anne Arundel Community College Associate Degree Nursing Program, Arnold
- Baltimore City Community College Associate Degree Nursing Program, Baltimore
- Carroll Community College Associate Degree Nursing Program, Westminster
- Cecil College, Associate Degree Nursing Program, North East
- Chesapeake College Associate Degree Nursing Program, Wye Mills
- College of Southern Maryland Associate Degree Nursing Program, La Plata
- Community College of Baltimore County Associate Degree Nursing Program, Essex and Catonsville
- Frederick Community College, Associate Degree Nursing Program, Frederick
- Hagerstown Community College, Associate Degree Nursing Program, Hagerstown
- Harford Community College Associate Degree Nursing Program, Bel Air
- Howard Community College, Associate Degree Nursing Program, Columbia
- Montgomery College Associate Degree Nursing Program, Takoma Park/Silver Spring
- Prince George's Community College Associate Degree Nursing Program, Largo
- Wor-Wic Community College Associate Degree Nursing Program, Salisbury

== Massachusetts ==
- Anna Maria College, Paxton
- Becker College, Worcester
- Boston College Connell School of Nursing, Boston
- Brockton Hospital School of Nursing/Fisher College
- Curry College, Milton
- Elms College, Chicopee
- Emmanuel College, Boston
- Endicott College, Beverly
- Framingham State University. Framingham
- Fitchburg State University, Fitchburg
- Holyoke Community College, Holyoke
- Lawrence Memorial/Regis College Nursing Program, Medford
- Massachusetts Bay Community College, Wellesley
- Mass General Brigham University of Health Professions, Boston
- Mount Wachusett Community College, Nursing Department, Gardner
- Northeastern University Bouvé College of Health Sciences, Boston
- Quinsigamond Community College, Worcester
- Regis College School of Nursing, Science and Health Professions, Weston
- Salem State University, Salem
- Simmons University, Boston
- Springfield Technical Community College, Springfield
- University of Massachusetts
  - Amherst
  - Boston
  - Dartmouth
  - Lowell
  - Graduate School of Nursing (Worcester)
- Worcester State University, Worcester

== Michigan ==
- Eastern Michigan University College of Health and Human Services School of Nursing, Ypsilanti
- Grand Valley State University Kirkhof College of Nursing, Allendale
- Kirtland Community College, Roscommon
- Lake Superior State University School of Nursing, Sault Sainte Marie
- Macomb Community College, Warren
- Michigan State University College of Nursing, East Lansing
- Mid Michigan Community College, Harrison
- Northern Michigan University School of Nursing, Marquette
- Oakland Community College, Waterford
- Oakland University School of Nursing, Rochester
- University of Detroit Mercy College of Health Professions McAuley School of Nursing, Detroit
- University of Michigan School of Nursing, Ann Arbor
- University of Michigan–Flint School of Nursing, Flint
- Washtenaw Community College, Ann Arbor
- Wayne State University College of Nursing, Detroit
- Western Michigan University Bronson School of Nursing, Kalamazoo

== Minnesota ==
- Alexandria Technical College Associate Degree Nursing Program, Alexandria
- Anoka-Ramsey Community College Associate Degree Nursing Program, Coon Rapids
- Bemidji State University Baccalaureate Nursing Program Department of Nursing, Bemidji
- Bethel University Nursing Department, St. Paul
- Central Lakes College Associate Degree Nursing Program, Brainerd
- College of St. Benedict/St. John's University Department of Nursing, St. Joseph
- St. Catherine University Associate Degree Nursing Program, Minneapolis
- St. Catherine University Department of Nursing, St. Paul
- The College of St. Scholastica Department of Nursing, Duluth
- Concordia College, Moorhead Nursing Program, Moorhead
- Crown College Baccalaureate Nursing Program, St. Bonifacius
- Fond du Lac Tribal and Community College/Lake Superior College Nursing Program, Cloquet
- Gustavus Adolphus College and St. Olaf College Minnesota Intercollegiate Nursing Consortium
  - Northfield
  - St. Peter
- Hibbing Community College Program in Nursing, Hibbing
  - Itasca Community College, Grand Rapids
  - Rainy River Community College, International Falls
  - Vermilion Community College, Ely
- Inver Hills-Century Colleges Associate Degree Nursing Program
  - Century College, White Bear Lake
  - Inver Hills Community College, Inver Grove Heights
- Lake Superior College Associate Degree Nursing Program, Duluth
- Metropolitan State University School of Nursing, St. Paul
- Minneapolis Community and Technical College Associate Degree Nursing Program, Minneapolis
- Minnesota State College Southeast - Southeast Technical Associate in Science - Nursing Mobility Program (RN)
  - Red Wing Satellite site, Red Wing
  - Winona Campus, Winona
- Minnesota State Community and Technical College Associate Degree Nursing Program
  - Detroit Lakes
  - Fergus Falls
  - Moorhead
  - Wadena
- Minnesota State University, Mankato School of Nursing, Mankato
- Minnesota State University Moorhead Baccalaureate Nursing Program, Moorhead
- Minnesota West Community and Technical College Associate Degree Nursing
  - Pipestone
  - Worthington
- Normandale Community College Nursing Program, Bloomington
- North Hennepin Community College Nursing Program
  - Brooklyn Park
  - St. Cloud
- Northland Community and Technical College Associate in Science Degree - Nursing Program
  - East Grand Forks
  - Thief River Falls
- Owatonna College and University Center, Owatonna
- Pine Technical College, Pine City
  - Aberdeen, South Dakota
  - Fairmont
- Richfield Campus-Globe University/Minnesota School of Business Bachelor of Science in Nursing Program (BSN), Richfield
- Ridgewater College Associate Degree Nursing Program
  - Hutchinson
  - Willmar
- Riverland Community College Associate Degree Nursing Program
  - Albert Lea
  - Austin
- Rochester Community and Technical College Associate Degree Nursing Program, Rochester
- St. Cloud State University Department of Nursing Science, St. Cloud
- South Central College Associate Degree Nursing Program
  - Faribault
  - North Mankato
- University of Minnesota School of Nursing, Minneapolis
- University of Minnesota Rochester, Rochester
- White Earth Tribal and Community College, Mahnomen
- Winona State University College of Nursing and Health Sciences Department of Nursing
  - Rochester
  - Winona

== Mississippi ==
- Delta State University, Cleveland
- Mississippi College, Clinton
- Mississippi Gulf Coast Community College, multiple locations
- Mississippi University for Women, Columbus
- University of Mississippi Medical Center, Jackson
- University of Southern Mississippi, Hattiesburg
- Alcorn State University, Lorman

== Missouri ==
- Avila University School of Nursing - College of Science & Health, Kansas City
- Columbia College Nursing Department, Columbia
- Crowder College, Neosho
- Cox College, Springfield
- East Central College, Union
- Goldfarb School of Nursing at Barnes-Jewish College, St. Louis
- Hannibal–LaGrange University Craigmiles School of Nursing, Hannibal
- Jefferson College, Hillsboro
- Lincoln University, Fort Leonard Wood
- Maryville University School of Nursing, St. Louis
- Metropolitan Community College Penn Valley, Kansas City
- Mineral Area College, Park Hills
- Missouri State University School of Nursing, West Plains
- Moberly Area Community College, Moberly
- North Central Missouri College, Trenton and Maryville
- Ozarks Technical Community College, Springfield
- Research College of Nursing, Kansas City
- Rockhurst University Saint Luke's College of Nursing and Health Sciences, Kansas City
- Southeast Missouri Hospital College of Nursing and Health Sciences, Cape Girardeau
- Southwest Baptist University College of Health Professions, Springfield
- St. Charles Community College, St. Peters
- St. Louis Community College, St. Louis
- State Fair Community College, Sedalia
- State Technical College of Missouri, Linn
- University of Missouri Sinclair School of Nursing, Columbia
- University of Missouri–Kansas City School of Nursing, Kansas City
- University of Missouri–St. Louis School of Nursing, St. Louis
- Three Rivers College, Poplar Bluff
- Truman State University School of Nursing, Kirksville

== Montana ==
- Carroll College, Helena
- Montana State University College of Nursing, Bozeman
- Salish Kootenai College, Pablo

== Nebraska ==
- Clarkson College, Omaha
- College of Saint Mary, Nursing Program, Omaha
- Creighton University, Omaha
- Nebraska Methodist College, Omaha
- Nebraska Wesleyan University, Nursing Program, Lincoln
- University of Nebraska Medical Center, Omaha

== Nevada ==
- Arizona College School of Nursing, Las Vegas
- College of Southern Nevada, Clark County
- Great Basin College, Elko
- Roseman University of Health Sciences, Accelerated BSN, Las Vegas
- Truckee Meadows Community College, Reno
- Unitek College, Reno, Nevada
- UNLV School of Nursing, Las Vegas
- University of Nevada, Reno, Reno
- Western Nevada College, Carson City

== New Hampshire ==
- Colby-Sawyer College, New London
- Great Bay Community College, Portsmouth
- Keene State College, Keene
- Lakes Region Community College, Laconia
- Manchester Community College, Manchester
- Massachusetts College of Pharmacy and Health Sciences, Manchester
- Nashua Community College, Nashua
- NHTI, Concord's Community College, Concord
- Plymouth State University, Plymouth
- River Valley Community College, Claremont
- Rivier University, Nashua
- Saint Anselm College, Goffstown
- Saint Joseph School of Nursing, Nashua
- University of New Hampshire Department of Nursing, Durham
- White Mountains Community College, Berlin

== New Jersey ==
- County College of Morris, Nursing Department, Randolph
- Mountainside Hospital School of Nursing, Montclair
- Rutgers Health, several locations
- Seton Hall University, College of Nursing, South Orange
- The College of New Jersey School of Nursing, Ewing
- William Paterson University School of Nursing, Wayne
- Ramapo College of New Jersey, School of Nursing, Mahwah, New Jersey

== New Mexico ==
- Brookline College, Albuquerque
- Eastern New Mexico University Nursing Department, Roswell
- New Mexico State University School of Nursing, Las Cruces
- University of New Mexico College of Nursing, Albuquerque

== New York ==
- Adelphi University School of Nursing, Garden City
- Binghamton University, SUNY, Decker School of Nursing, Binghamton
- Broome Community College, SUNY, Binghamton
- Dutchess Community College, Poughkeepsie
- D'Youville University, Buffalo
- Ellis School of Nursing, Schenectady
- Excelsior College School of Nursing, Albany
- Farmingdale State College, SUNY, Farmingdale
- Fulton-Montgomery Community College, Johnstown
- Hartwick College, Oneonta
- Manhattanville University, School of Nursing and Health Sciences, Purchase
- Molloy University, Barbara Hagan School of Nursing, Rockville Centre
- Mount Saint Mary College, Newburgh
- Pomeroy College of Nursing at Crouse Hospital, Syracuse
- Roberts Wesleyan University School of Nursing, Rochester
- Russell Sage College School of Nursing, Troy
- St. John Fisher University, Rochester
- Saint Joseph's University, Brooklyn and Patchogue
- St. Joseph's College of Nursing, Syracuse
- St. Peter’s Hospital College of Nursing, Albany
- Samaritan Hospital School of Nursing, Albany
- Stony Brook University, SUNY, School of Nursing, Stony Brook
- Trocaire College, Catherine McAuley School of Nursing Buffalo
- University at Buffalo, SUNY, School of Nursing, Buffalo
- University of Rochester, Helen Wood Hall School of Nursing, Rochester
- Utica University, Syracuse

=== New York City ===
- Bronx Community College CUNY
- University of Mount Saint Vincent, Riverdale, Bronx
- Columbia University School of Nursing
- CUNY Lehman College School of Nursing, The Bronx
- CUNY School of Professional Studies, online
- Helene Fuld College of Nursing
- Hunter-Bellevue School of Nursing, Hunter College, CUNY
- New Age Training Business School
- New York University College of Nursing
- Pace University School of Nursing (also in Pleasantville
- Pacific College of Health and Science, Nursing Program, New York
- Mount Sinai Phillips School of Nursing
- Touro School of Nursing, Brooklyn

=== Defunct ===
- Harlem Hospital, Harlem Hospital School of Nursing, New York City (1923–1977)
- Lincoln Hospital, Lincoln School for Nurses, New York City (1898–1961)
- Long Island College Hospital School of Nursing, Brooklyn, New York City (1899–2011)

== North Carolina ==
- Appalachian State University School of Nursing, Boone
- Cabarrus College of Health Sciences Louise Harkey School of Nursing, Concord
- Cape Fear Community College, Wilmington
- Duke University School of Nursing, Durham
- East Carolina University College of Nursing, Greenville
- Fayetteville Technical Community College, Fayetteville
- North Carolina Central University School of Nursing, Durham
- University of North Carolina at Chapel Hill School of Nursing, Chapel Hill
- University of North Carolina at Charlotte School of Nursing, Charlotte
- University of North Carolina at Greensboro School of Nursing, Greensboro
- University of North Carolina at Wilmington School of Nursing, Wilmington
- Wake Forest University Department of Health and Exercise Science, Winston-Salem
- Wake Technical Community College Health Sciences Department, Raleigh
- Watts School of Nursing, Durham
- Winston Salem State University School of Nursing, Winston-Salem

== North Dakota ==
- Dickinson State University Department of Nursing, Dickinson
- University of Jamestown Department of Nursing, Jamestown
- Lake Region State College Dakota Nursing Program, Devils Lake
- Medcenter One College of Nursing, Bismarck
- Minot State University College of Nursing, Minot
- North Dakota State College of Science, Wahpeton
- North Dakota State University, Fargo
- Tri-College University Nursing Consortium
  - Concordia College, Moorhead, Minnesota
  - Minnesota State University Moorhead, Moorhead, Minnesota
  - North Dakota State University, Fargo
- United Tribes Technical College, Bismarck
- University of Mary Division of Nursing, Bismarck
- University of North Dakota College of Nursing, Grand Forks

== Ohio ==
- Ashland University School of Nursing, Ashland
- Case Western Reserve University Frances Payne Bolton School of Nursing, Cleveland
- Cedarville University School of Nursing, Cedarville
- Christ College of Nursing & Health Sciences, Cincinnati
- Clark State Community College, Springfield
- Cleveland State University School of Nursing, Cleveland
- Columbus State Community College, Columbus
- Franciscan University of Steubenville, Steubenville
- Hiram College School of Nursing, Hiram
- Kent State University College of Nursing, Kent
- Kent State University at Ashtabula, Ashtabula
- Kent State University at East Liverpool, East Liverpool
- Kent State University at Salem, Salem
- Kent State University at Stark, Jackson Township
- Kettering College, Kettering
- Lorain County Community College, Elyria
- Lourdes University, Sylvania
- MedCentral College of Nursing, Mansfield
- Miami University, Oxford
- Mount Carmel College of Nursing, Columbus
- Notre Dame College, South Euclid
- Ohio Northern University, Ada
- Ohio State University College of Nursing, Columbus
- Ohio University School of Nursing, Athens
- Otterbein University, Westerville
- Sinclair Community College, Dayton
- Springfield Regional School of Nursing, Springfield
- University of Akron, Akron
- Walsh University, North Canton
- Wright State University College of Nursing and Health, Dayton

== Oklahoma ==
- Cameron University Bachelor's degree with OU College of Nursing, Lawton
- Cameron University Associate Degree with Western Oklahoma State College, Lawton
- Oklahoma City University, Kramer School of Nursing, Oklahoma City
- Oklahoma Wesleyan University School of Nursing, Bartlesville
- University of Central Oklahoma Edmond
- University of Oklahoma College of Nursing, Oklahoma City
- Western Oklahoma State College, Altus
- Tulsa Community College, Tulsa
- Rogers State College, Claremore
- Oklahoma State University Institute of Technology, Okmulgee
- Northeastern State University, Tahlequah

== Oregon ==
- George Fox University, School of Nursing, Newberg
- Linfield University-Good Samaritan School of Nursing, Portland
- Oregon Health & Science University School of Nursing, Portland
- University of Portland School of Nursing, Portland
- Walla Walla University, School of Nursing, Washington
- Portland Community College School of Nursing, Portland

== Pennsylvania ==
- Carlow University College of Health & Wellness, Pittsburgh
- Drexel University College of Nursing and Health Professions Nursing Program, Philadelphia
- Duquesne University School of Nursing Nursing Program, Pittsburgh
- Eastern University Nursing Program, St. David's
- Gannon University Nursing Program, Erie
- Gwynedd Mercy University, Gwynedd Valley
- Holy Family University Nursing Program, Northeast Philadelphia
- Jefferson Abington Hospital Dixon School of Nursing, Willow Grove
- Methodist Hospital School of Nursing, Philadelphia
- Mount Aloysius College, Cresson
- Northeastern Hospital School of Nursing part of the Temple University Health System, with science courses provided through the Community College of Philadelphia, Philadelphia
- Ohio Valley Hospital School of Nursing, Kennedy Township
- Pennsylvania College of Health Sciences, Lancaster
- Pennsylvania State University School of Nursing, Hershey and University Park
- Pottsville Hospital School of Nursing, Pottsville
- Roxborough Memorial Hospital School of Nursing, Philadelphia
- St. Luke's School of Nursing, Bethlehem
- Thomas Jefferson University, Jefferson College of Health Professions Department of Nursing, Philadelphia
- University of Pennsylvania School of Nursing, Philadelphia
- University of Pittsburgh School of Nursing, Pittsburgh
- UPMC Shadyside School of Nursing, Pittsburgh
- Villanova University College of Nursing, Villanova
- Widener University Online RN-BSN, Chester
- York College of Pennsylvania, York

== Rhode Island ==
- Community College of Rhode Island, Warwick
- New England Institute of Technology School of Nursing, East Greenwich
- Providence College, School of Nursing and Health Sciences, Providence
- Rhode Island College School of Nursing, Providence
- Salve Regina University School of Nursing, Newport
- University of Rhode Island School of Nursing, Kingston

=== Defunct ===
- Saint Joseph School of Nursing, North Providence

== South Carolina ==
- Clemson University College of Nursing, Clemson
- Francis Marion University College of Liberal Arts: Department of Nursing, Florence
- Medical University of South Carolina School of Nursing, Charleston
- University of South Carolina College of Nursing, Columbia
- University of South Carolina Aiken School of Nursing, Aiken
- University of South Carolina Upstate Mary Black School of Nursing, Spartanburg
- The Citadel Swain Department of Nursing, Charleston

== South Dakota ==
- Dakota Wesleyan University Department of Nursing, Mitchell
- Mount Marty University, Yankton
- Oglala Lakota College Nursing Program, Kyle
- Sisseton Wahpeton College Nursing Program, Sisseton
- South Dakota State University, College of Nursing, Brookings
- University of South Dakota, Department of Nursing, Vermillion

== Tennessee ==
- Austin Peay State University, School of Nursing (BSN, MSN, FNP), Clarksville
- East Tennessee State University, College of Nursing (BSN, MSN, DNP), Johnson City
- King College School of Nursing, Bristol
- Marian University Accelerated BSN, Nashville
- Middle Tennessee State University School of Nursing, Murfreesboro
- South College School of Nursing (BSN), Knoxville
- Tennessee State University College of Nursing, Nashville
- Tennessee Technological University, School of Nursing (BSN, MSN), Cookeville
- University of Memphis Loewenberg College of Nursing (BSN, MSN, FNP), Memphis
- Vanderbilt University School of Nursing, Nashville

== Texas ==
School	Affiliated institution(s)	City/cities
Scott and White College of Nursing	University of Mary Hardin–Baylor	Belton
Denver College of Nursing	Denver College of Nursing (Colorado)	Houston
Department of Nursing	Tarleton State University	Stephenville
DeWitt School of Nursing	Stephen F. Austin State University	Nacogdoches
College of Nursing	Prairie View A&M University	Houston
Wilson School of Nursing	Midwestern State University	Wichita Falls
College of Arts & Sciences	Lamar University	Beaumont
College of Science, Technology, Engineering, Mathematics and Nursing	Texas A&M University–Texarkana	Texarkana
Frank S. Groner School of Professional Studies	East Texas Baptist University	Marshall
School of Nursing and Allied Health	Houston Christian University	Houston
St. David's School of Nursing	Texas State University	Round Rock
College of Nursing and Health Sciences	Texas A&M International University	Laredo
Texas A&M Health Science Center College of Nursing	Texas A&M University	Bryan
Texas A&M Health Science Center College of Nursing	Texas A&M University	Round Rock
Texas A&M Health Science Center College of Nursing	Texas A&M University	McAllen
College of Nursing and Health Sciences	Texas A&M University–Corpus Christi	Corpus Christi
College of Nursing and Health Sciences	University of Texas at Tyler	Longview
College of Nursing and Health Sciences	University of Texas at Tyler	Palestine
College of Nursing and Health Sciences	University of Texas at Tyler	Tyler
School of Nursing	University of Texas of the Permian Basin	Odessa
School of Nursing	University of Houston	Katy
School of Nursing	University of Houston	Sugar Land
School of Nursing	University of Houston	Victoria
School of Nursing	Abilene Christian University	Abilene
Patty Hanks Shelton School of Nursing	Hardin–Simmons University	Abilene
Patty Hanks Shelton School of Nursing	McMurry University	Abilene
School of Nursing	University of Texas at El Paso	El Paso
College of Nursing and Health Innovation	University of Texas at Arlington	Arlington
College of Nursing and Allied Health	Angelo State University	San Angelo
Louise Herrington School of Nursing	Baylor University	Dallas
Covenant School of Nursing	Covenant Health System	Lubbock
Covenant School of Nursing	Lubbock Christian University	Lubbock
Harris College of Nursing & Health Sciences	Texas Christian University	Fort Worth
Anita Thigpen Perry School of Nursing	Texas Tech University Health Sciences Center	Abilene
Anita Thigpen Perry School of Nursing	Texas Tech University Health Sciences Center	Amarillo
Anita Thigpen Perry School of Nursing	Texas Tech University Health Sciences Center	Lubbock
Anita Thigpen Perry School of Nursing	Texas Tech University Health Sciences Center	Odessa
School of Nursing	Sam Houston State University	Huntsville
Gayle Greve Hunt School of Nursing	Texas Tech University Health Sciences Center El Paso	El Paso
School of Nursing	University of Texas at Austin	Austin
School of Nursing	University of Texas Health Science Center at Houston	Houston
School of Nursing	University of Texas Health Science Center at San Antonio	San Antonio
College of Nursing	Texas Woman's University	Dallas
College of Nursing	Texas Woman's University	Denton
College of Nursing	Texas Woman's University	Houston
College of Nursing and Health Sciences	West Texas A&M University	Canyon
School of Nursing	University of St. Thomas	Houston
School of Nursing	University of Texas Medical Branch	Galveston
Nursing Program (ADN and LVN)	Vernon College	Vernon
Nursing Program (ADN)	Brookhaven College	Farmers Branch
Nursing Program (ADN)	El Centro College	Dallas
Nursing Program (ADN)	Mountain View College (Texas)	Dallas

== Utah ==
- Brigham Young University College of Nursing, Provo
- Eagle Gate College
- Fortis College
- Joyce University of Nursing and Health Sciences, Draper
- Nightingale College, Salt Lake City
- Provo College
- Roseman University of Health Sciences, Accelerated BSN, South Jordan
- Salt Lake Community College
- Snow College, Ephraim
- Southern Utah University, Cedar City
- University of Utah School of Nursing, Salt Lake City
- Utah State University
- Utah Tech University, St. George
- Utah Valley University, Orem
- Weber State University, Ogden
- Western Governors University, online, based in Salt Lake City, available nationwide
- Westminster University School of Nursing, Salt Lake City

=== Defunct in Utah ===
- Broadview University aka Utah Career College
- Dee Hospital School of Nursing, Ogden
- Everest College, West Valley City
- Dr. Groves LDS Hospital School of Nursing, Salt Lake
- Stevens Henager College

== Vermont ==
- Norwich University, Northfield
- Southern Vermont College, Bennington
- University of Vermont School of Nursing, Burlington
- Vermont State University, Castleton
- Vermont State University, Randolph Center

== Virginia ==
- Eastern Mennonite University School of Nursing, Harrisonburg
- George Mason University School of Nursing, Fairfax
- Hampton University School of Nursing, Hampton
- James Madison University School of Nursing, Harrisonburg
- Jefferson College of Health Sciences, Department of Nursing, Roanoke
- Liberty University School of Nursing, Lynchburg
- University of Lynchburg School of Nursing, Lynchburg
- Marymount University School of Nursing, Arlington
- Norfolk State University School of Nursing, Norfolk
- Old Dominion University School of Nursing, Norfolk
- Radford University School of Nursing, Radford
- Shenandoah University School of Nursing, Winchester
- University of Virginia School of Nursing, Charlottesville
- Virginia Commonwealth University School of Nursing, Richmond

== Washington ==
- Gonzaga University Department of Nursing, Spokane
- MediCare Professionals, Training in Mental Development Online Nursing and Child Care Education Center
- Northwest University Buntain School of Nursing, Kirkland
- Pacific Lutheran University School of Nursing, Tacoma
- Seattle University College of Nursing, Seattle
- University of Washington School of Nursing, Seattle
- Walla Walla University, School of Nursing, College Place
- Washington State University College of Nursing, Spokane

== West Virginia ==
- Alderson-Broaddus College Department of Nursing, Philippi
- Bluefield State University School of Nursing & Allied Health, Bluefield
- Davis & Elkins College RN program & RN to BSN, Elkins
- Fairmont State University School of Nursing & Allied Health Administration, Fairmont
- Marshall University School of Nursing & Health Professions, Huntington
- Shepherd University School of Nursing Education, Shepherdstown
- West Liberty University Department of Nursing, West Liberty
- West Virginia University Health Services Center School of Nursing, Morgantown

== Wisconsin ==
- Alverno College, School of Nursing, Milwaukee
- Bellin College, School of Nursing, Green Bay
- Blackhawk Technical College, Nursing Department, Janesville
- Bryant & Stratton College, Glendale
- Cardinal Stritch University, Ruth S. Coleman College of Nursing, Milwaukee
- Chippewa Valley Technical College, Eau Claire
- Concordia University Wisconsin, Mequon
- Fox Valley Technical College, Appleton
- Gateway Technical College, Burlington
- Herzing University, 5 locations
- Lakeshore Technical College, Cleveland
- Madison Area Technical College, Madison
- Marquette University, College of Nursing, Milwaukee
- Mid-State Technical College, Wisconsin Rapids
- Milwaukee Area Technical College, Milwaukee
- Milwaukee School of Engineering, School of Nursing, Milwaukee
- Moraine Park Technical College, Fond du Lac
- Mount Mary University, Department of Nursing, Milwaukee
- Nicolet Area Technical College, Rhinelander
- Northcentral Technical College, Wausau
- Northeast Wisconsin Technical College, multiple campuses
- Southwest Wisconsin Technical College, Fennimore
- University of Wisconsin–Eau Claire, College of Nursing and Health Sciences, Eau Claire
- University of Wisconsin–Green Bay, Professional Program in Nursing, Green Bay
- University of Wisconsin–Madison, School of Nursing, Madison
- University of Wisconsin–Milwaukee, College of Nursing, Milwaukee
- University of Wisconsin–Oshkosh, College of Nursing, Oshkosh
- University of Wisconsin–Parkside, College of Nursing, Kenosha
- Viterbo University, School of Nursing, La Crosse
- Waukesha County Technical College, Pewaukee
- Western Technical College, La Crosse
- Wisconsin Indianhead Technical College, Superior
- Wisconsin Lutheran College, Milwaukee/Wauwatosa

== Wyoming ==
- Casper College, Casper
- Central Wyoming College, Riverton
- Laramie County Community College, Cheyenne
- Northern Wyoming Community College District, Gillette
- Northern Wyoming Community College, Sheridan
- Northwest College, Powell
- University of Wyoming Fay W. Whitney School of Nursing, Laramie
- Western Wyoming Community College, Rock Springs

== District of Columbia ==
- Catholic University of America School of Nursing
- Georgetown University School of Nursing and Health Studies
- George Washington University Graduate School of Nursing
- Howard University Division of Nursing
- Radians College
- Misericordia University Nursing Program,
- Trinity Washington University
- University of the District of Columbia School of Nursing

== Guam ==
- University of Guam School of Nursing and Health Sciences, Mangilao

== U.S. Virgin Islands ==
- University of the Virgin Islands Nursing Division, St. Thomas

== Puerto Rico ==
- University of Puerto Rico Nursing School, San Juan, Puerto Rico
- Ana G. Mendez University - Universidad Metropolitana Nursing School, Cupey, San Juan; Bayamon

== See also ==
- List of nursing schools in Europe
- List of nursing schools in Malaysia
