= University of Michigan School of Nursing =

Nursing school in Ann Arbor, Michigan

Coordinates: 42°17′06.5″N 83°44′18.8″W

- Motto: Artes, Scientia, Veritas
- Type: Public nursing school
- Established: 1891; 135 years ago
- Parent institution: University of Michigan
- Dean: Allison R Webel
- Students: 1,183 (FA 2023)
- Location: Ann Arbor, Michigan, United States
- Website: nursing.umich.edu

The University of Michigan School of Nursing is the nursing school of the University of Michigan, and is located in the Old Fourth Ward neighborhood of Ann Arbor, Michigan.

It was first opened as the University of Michigan Training School for Nurses in 1891, when it offered a two-year curriculum.

== See also ==
- List of nursing schools in the United States
