= UNLV School of Nursing =

Nursing school in Nevada

Coordinates: 36.1073°N 115.1456°W

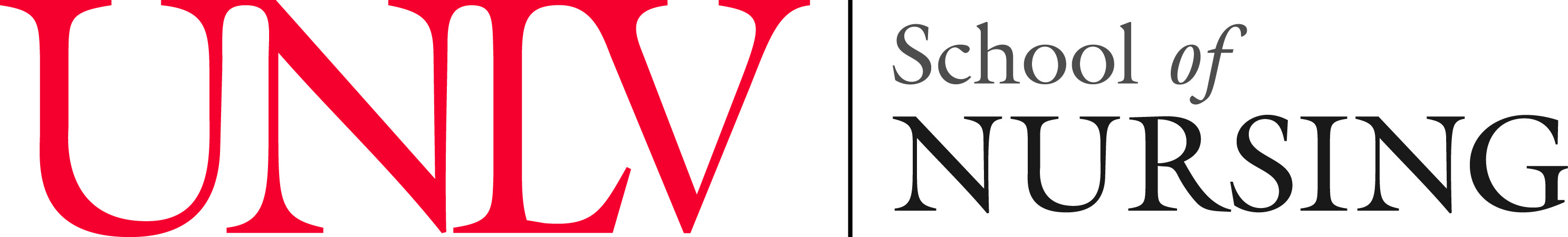
- Type: Public
- Established: 1965; 61 years ago
- Parent institution: UNLV
- Dean: Angela Amar
- Location: Las Vegas, Nevada, U.S.
- Website: https://www.unlv.edu/nursing

University of Nevada, Las Vegas (UNLV) School of Nursing is a nursing school affiliated with the University of Nevada, Las Vegas (UNLV). The School of Nursing offers the BSN, MSN, DNP, and PhD degrees. The School is accredited by the Commission on Collegiate Nursing Education, and has full approval by the Nevada State Board of Nursing. Students utilize the Clinical Simulation Center of Las Vegas, located within the UNLV Shadow Lane Campus in the Las Vegas Medical District.

== History ==
The school was founded in 1965, when the Board of Regents approved the associate degree of Nursing (ADN) program. This was temporarily operated by the UNR Orvis School of Nursing, until January 1966, when control transferred to Nevada Southern University (UNLV). In 1975, a "2+2" program was created to allow ADN students to earn a bachelor's degree. A family nurse practitioner program was added in 1992. In Fall 2004, the Department of Nursing became the UNLV School of Nursing, and a PhD program was added in 2005.

== Programs ==
School of Nursing has graduate programs that allow nurses to attain a PhD in Interdisciplinary Health Sciences or PhD in Nursing. The MSN program has two focuses: Nurse Educator or Family Nurse Practitioner. The School also offers three Advanced Graduate Certificates in Biobehavioral Nursing, Family Nurse Practitioner or Nursing Education.

== See also ==
- List of nursing schools in the United States
