= Upper division college =

Final two years of a four-year undergraduate degree

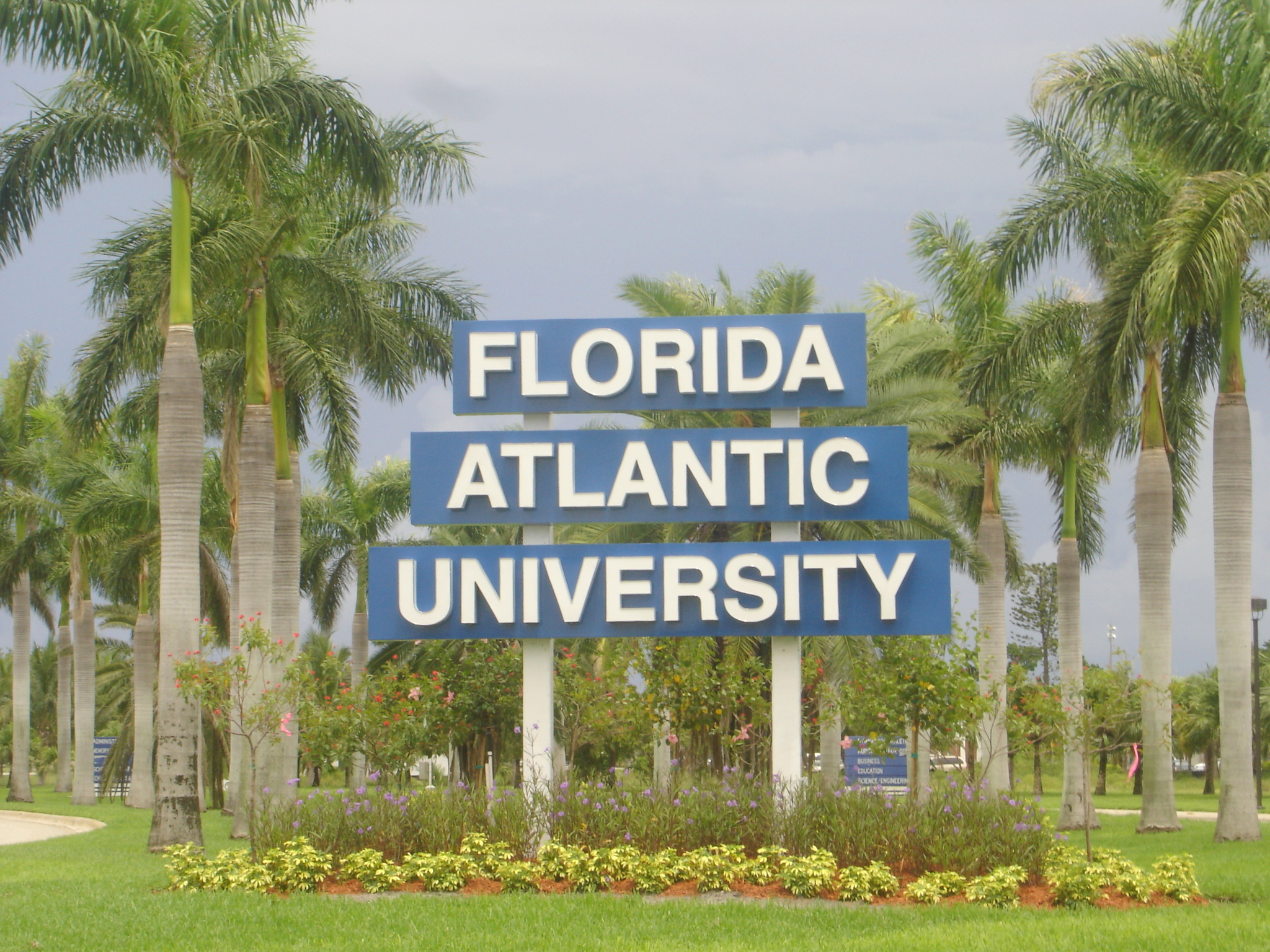
Florida Atlantic University, one of the first upper division colleges

An upper division college or university is one that requires applicants to have already completed their first two years of undergraduate study at another institution. These institutions traces their roots to educational ideas put forward in the late 19th and early 20th century. They were developed primarily in the United States during the 1960s in response to the growing number of community college students seeking to continue their education.

== History ==
In the late 19th and early 20th century, educational leaders such as William R. Harper and David Starr Jordan sought to separate the preparatory portion of college studies from "real" university work undertaken in the third and fourth years of study. Jordan, then president of Stanford University, proposed splitting the institution into two parts in 1907 to reach this goal, however changes in the California secondary school system halted this proposal. In 1914 Frank Johnson Goodnow became president of Johns Hopkins University and proposed eliminating the bachelor's degree by cutting the first two years of undergraduate work. Called the Goodnow Plan or New Plan, students would have entered Hopkins after two years of study in other universities and would have worked toward an advanced degree, bypassing the bachelor's degree.

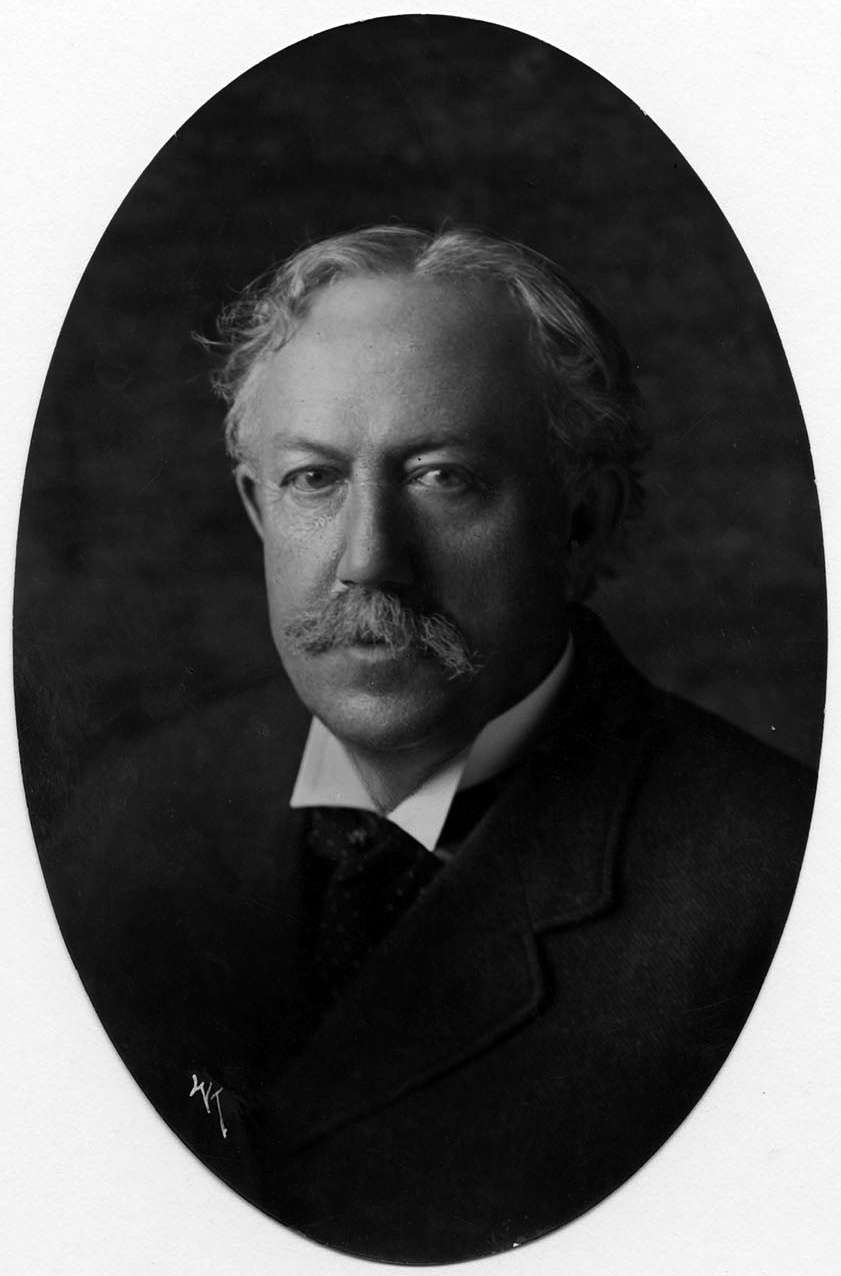
David Starr Jordan, one of the early pioneers of upper division colleges

Upper division colleges were first established as mainstream institutions in the 1950s in the United States as a means to respond to the need for educated professionals to assist in the space race. While earlier efforts had been undertaken at the University of Georgia in 1858, they failed due to the onset of the American Civil War.

The first upper division college was the College of the Pacific in Stockton, California, which operated as an upper-division college between 1935 and 1951, before becoming the University of the Pacific in 1961. This was done as part of a plan to reduce costs and increase enrollment by subletting college facilities to a high school which assumed public junior college status and funding. However, disagreements between the College of the Pacific and the affiliated junior college, as well as accreditation issues resulting from the arrangement, led to the abandonment of the experiment in 1951.

The first college founded as an upper division college was University of Michigan–Flint, which was founded in 1956 as Flint College, however it converted to four year status in 1965 as a result of changes in the development of the region.

Another notable early upper division college was Florida Atlantic University, which opened in 1964 and served third and fourth year undergraduate students, as well as graduate students. Later, in 1984, Florida Atlantic expanded to include first and second year undergraduates and ceased to be an upper division college.

At the time they were created, upper division colleges were seen as a way to better manage community resources and provide opportunities for students. It was thought that separating the upper division from the lower division of coursework would improve the relationship between undergraduate and graduate programs. Additionally, some believed that by creating 2+2 programs between community colleges and upper division colleges, students could continue their education without the state needing to expand existing community colleges into full four year colleges. Some commentators at the time saw the widespread development of upper division schools, in the same way community colleges had expanded in the prior decades.

== Decline ==
By the 1980s and 1990s, many states began to move away from the upper-division model. Despite concerns of crowding out of community colleges, it was felt that offering only the upper-level courses resulted in a poor public image and prevented the establishment of a full university setting. Many of the students seeking to transfer from a community college desired a full college experience, including electives and extra-curricular activities. The inability to reach a large critical mass prevented the upper division colleges from competing effectively with four year colleges. Some upper-division colleges such as the City University of New York's Richmond College merged with community colleges, while others such as Florida Atlantic and SUNY Institute of Technology opened their doors to freshman and sophomore undergraduates. As of 2009 very few upper-division colleges remain in the United States, with almost all merging with community colleges or converting to four year status.

== Colleges ==
Name	Started upper division	Ended upper division	Result
Athens State University	1975	—	Current public upper division college
College of the Pacific	1935	1951	Expanded to four years
Concordia Senior College	1957	1977	Closed
Florida International University	1972	1981	Expanded to four years
Garfield Senior College	1971	1985	Merged with Lake Erie College
Governors State University	1971	2014	GSU enrolled its first freshman class in August 2014
John F. Kennedy University	1965	2020	Closed
Metropolitan State University	1973	1994	Expanded to four years. This is the institution in Minnesota, and not to be confused with the similarly named institution in Colorado (which has been a four-year school since its founding).
Penn State Harrisburg	1966	2004	Expanded to four years
Oak Point University (formerly known as Resurrection University)	2003	2024	Closed on April 19, 2024, 3 weeks prior to the spring semester's conclusion; Lewis University announced they would help Oak Point students complete their degrees.
Richmond College	1965	1976	Merged with community college
St. Joseph's College (Long Island)	1972	1978	Expanded to four years
SUNY Institute of Technology	1966	2003	Expanded to four years
Texas A&M International University	1969	1995	Expanded to four years
Texas A&M University–Central Texas	2009	—	Current public upper division college
Texas A&M University–Corpus Christi	1973	1994	Expanded to four years
Texas A&M University–San Antonio	2009	2016	Expanded to four years
Texas A&M University–Texarkana	1971	2008	Expanded to four years
Texas A&M University–Victoria	1973	2009	Expanded to four years. Was University of Houston–Victoria before September 1, 2025
University of Baltimore	1975	2005	Expanded to four years
University of Hawaiʻi at West Oʻahu	1976	2007	Expanded to four years
University of Houston–Clear Lake	1971	2011	Ended upper-division in 2011 by statute; Admitted first freshman class in August 2014
University of Illinois Springfield (originally Sangamon State University)	1969	2001	Expanded to four years
University of Michigan–Dearborn	1959	1971	Expanded to four years
University of Michigan–Flint	1956	1965	Expanded to four years
University of North Florida	1972	1984	Expanded to four years
University of Texas at Brownsville	1973	1998	Expanded to four years; merged with the University of Texas–Pan American in 2013 to create the University of Texas Rio Grande Valley (first UTRGV classes in 2015)
University of Texas at Dallas	1969	1990	Expanded to four years
University of Texas at Tyler	1971	1998	Expanded to four years
University of Texas Permian Basin	1973	1991	Expanded to four years
University of West Florida	1967	1983	Expanded to four years
Walsh College	1968	—	Current private NFP upper division
