= Brookline College =

For-profit college in Arizona and New Mexico, US

- Type: Private for-profit college
- Established: 1979
- Parent institution: Unitek Learning
- Location: Phoenix, Arizona, United States
- Campus: Urban
- Website: www.brooklinecollege.edu

Brookline College is an American private for-profit college for healthcare and nursing. It has campuses in Arizona and New Mexico. Founded in 1979, it is part of Unitek Learning, a network of healthcare and nursing colleges in the United States.

== History ==
Brookline College was established in 1979 in Phoenix, Arizona. It is a private, for-profit institution that specializes in nursing and healthcare. The college expanded to include campuses in Tucson, Tempe, and Albuquerque. In 2015, Brookline became part of Unitek Learning, which operates several colleges focused on healthcare education.

== Campus ==
Brookline College operates four campuses, including Phoenix, Arizona; Tucson, Arizona; Tempe, Arizona; and Albuquerque, New Mexico. he Phoenix campus is located at 2445 West Dunlap Avenue, Suite 100 in Phoenix. The Tempe campus is located at 1140 South Priest Drive in Tempe. The Tucson campus is located at 5441 East 22nd Street, Suite 125 in Tucson. The Albuquerque campus is located at 4201 Central Avenue N.W. Suite J in Albuquerque.

== Academics ==
Brookline College offers programs primarily focused on healthcare and nursing. Academic offerings include diploma, associate, bachelor's, and master's degree programs in areas such as nursing, medical assistant, surgical technology, physical therapy assistant, and medical laboratory assistant.

U.S. New & World Report ranked Brookline College Albuquerque #570 for nursing schools for 2026.

Brookline College has a chapter of Sigma Theta Tau honor society for nursing.

=== Accreditation ===
Brookline College is institutionally accredited by the Accrediting Bureau of Health Education Schools (ABHES). The Bachelor of Science in Nursing and Master of Science in Nursing programs are accredited by the Commission on Collegiate Nursing Education (CCNE).

== Students ==
In 2025, Brookline College Albuquerque had 492 undergraduate students. Of those students 55 percent were Hispanic, 21 percent were White, 9 percent were Black, 8 percent were American Indian, 4 percent were Asian, 1 percent were two or more races, and 2 percent were unknown.

In 2025, Brookline College Phoenix had 714 undergraduate students. Of those students, 33 percent are Hispanic, 19 percent are White, 12 percent Black, 6 percent American Indian, 2 percent Asian, 1 percent two or more races, 1 percent Native Hawaiian/Pacific Islander, and 25 percent unknown.

== Notable people ==
=== Faculty ===
- Pamelya Herndon, New Mexico House of Representatives

== See also ==
- Eagle Gate College
- List of colleges and universities in Arizona
- List of colleges and universities in New Mexico
- List of for-profit universities and colleges
- List of nursing schools in the United States
- Unitek College
