= Unitek College of Nursing =

Private for-profit college in the United States

Coordinates: 37.5090°N 121.9617°W

- Type: Private for-profit college
- Established: 2002
- Parent institution: Unitek Learning
- Students: 326
- Location: 4670 Auto Mall Parkway, Fremont, California, 94538, United States
- Campus: Suburban
- Website: www.unitekcollege.edu

Unitek College of Nursing, formerly known as Unitek College (until July 2026), is an American private for-profit institution based in Fremont, California. Founded in 2002, it maintains campuses in California and Nevada. The school offers diploma, associate, and bachelor's programs in Nursing and Medical assisting. It is operated by Unitek Learning. The institution adopted its current name on July 8, 2026, to reflect its longstanding focus on nursing and healthcare education.

== History ==
Unitek College of Nursing is a private for-profit educational institution that is owned by Unitek Learning, based in Newport Beach, California.

Unitek College began as a healthcare college in Fremont, California, in 2002. Over the next decade, Unitek expanded its campuses throughout California. It also has a campus in Reno, Nevada. In July 2026, the institution changed its name to Unitek College of Nursing, citing its focus on nursing education and its role in addressing healthcare workforce shortages. Its academic programs, accreditations, and campus locations were unaffected by the change.

== Campus ==
Unitek College maintains campuses in Bakersfield, Concord, Fremont, Hayward, Ontario, Sacramento, San Jose, and South San Francisco in California and in Reno, Nevada. Its headquarters is in Fremont.

== Academics ==
Unitek College offers certificate, associate, and bachelor's degrees. This includes certificate programs in dental assisting, medical assisting, medical office administration, vocational nursing, physical therapy, an Associate of Science in vocational nursing (ASVN), and a Bachelor of Science in nursing (BSN). The majority of its students are certificate seeking.

The college has a chapter of Sigma Theta Tau honor society for nursing.

== Students ==
The college has 326 undergraduate students, of which 27 percent are Asian, 25 percent are Hispanic, 13 percent are Black, 3 percent are white, 2 percent are Hawaiian/Pacific Islander, and 29 percent are unknown. In 2023, 84 percent of its students were women.

== Accreditation ==
Unitek College and its programs are accredited and approved by:

- Accrediting Commission of Career Schools and Colleges (ACCSC)
- Accreditation Commission for Education in Nursing, associate, May 2005
- Commission on Collegiate Nursing Education (CCNE)
- California Board of Vocational Nursing and Psychiatric Technicians (BVNPT)
- California Bureau for Private Postsecondary Education
- California Board of Registered Nursing (BRN)
- Nevada State Board of Nursing
- National League for Nursing Commission for Nursing Education Accreditation (NLN CNEA)

== See also ==
- Brookline College
- Eagle Gate College
- List of for-profit universities and colleges
- List of nursing schools in the United States
- List of smoke-free colleges and universities
