= Eagle Gate College =

For-profit health college in Utah and Idaho, US

- Type: Private for-profit college
- Established: 1979
- Parent institution: Unitek Learning
- Location: Layton and Murray, Utah, United States
- Campus: Urban
- Website: www.eaglegatecollege.edu

Eagle Gate College is an American private for-profit college that specializes in health career education. The college has campuses in Utah and Idaho. Eagle Gate College also offers programs online.

== History ==
Eagle Gate College was founded in 1979 under the name of Intermountain College of Court Reporting in Murray, Utah. Intermountain College was acquired by Bullen and Wilson, LLC in July 2001. It opened as Eagle Gate College in August 2001. At that time, the court reporting college's curriculum was expanded to include diplomas in high demand programs, including business, computer networking and programming, graphic design, healthcare, information technology, and medical assisting.

Eagle Gate College was approved to offer Associate of Science degrees in January 2002. It expanded to include Bachelor of Science degrees in October 2007. A new campus was established in Layton, Utah in September 2004. A third campus was added in 2019 in Boise, Idaho.

In 2020, the college's ownership changed to Unitek Learning. It is a private for-profit institution.

== Campus ==
Eagle Gate College has campuses in Utah (Layton and Murray) and Idaho (Boise and Idaho Falls). The Murry campus is located at 5588 South Green Street Suite 150 in Murray, Utah. It includes a 22,000 square feet facility, with a simulation lab and a virtual reality laboratory.

The Layton campus is located at 915 North 400 West in Layton, Utah. The Boise campus is located at 9300 West Overland Road Suite #200 in Boise, Idaho. The Idaho Falls campus is located at 1592 East 17th Street in Idaho Falls, Idaho.

It also has a virtual campus, headquartered at the main campus in Murray.

== Academics ==
Eagle Gate College provides training in healthcare and nursing. It offers Bachelor's, associates, certificates, and diplomas in fields such as medical assisting, nursing, and practical nursing. In February 2020, the college added a Master of Science in Nursing that is focused on nursing administration and leadership. U.S. News and World Report ranked the college at #624 or 686 nursing schools in the United States for 2026.

The college is accredited by the Accrediting Bureau of Health Education Schools. The Bachelor of Science in nursing degree is accredited by the Commission on Collegiate Nursing Education.

Eagle Gate College has a chapter of Sigma Theta Tau honor society for nursing.

== Students ==
In 2025, the Eagle Gate College Murray campus had 263 undergraduates and 50 graduates students, for a total enrollment of 313. Of those students, 48 percent were White, 20 percent were Hispanic, 15 percent unknown, 6 percent Black, 5 percent Asian, 3 percent Pacific Islander, 2 percent American Indian, and 1 percent two or more races.

== See also ==
- Brookline College
- List of colleges and universities in Utah
- List of for-profit universities and colleges
- List of nursing schools in the United States
- Unitek College
