= Texas A&M University–Central Texas =

Public university in Killeen, Texas, US

- Former names: American Technological University (1973–1989); University of Central Texas (1989–1999); Tarleton State University–Central Texas (1999–2009)
- Type: Public
- Established: 1999 (Tarleton State University campus); 2009 (A&M system)
- Affiliations: Texas A&M University System
- President: Marc Nigliazzo
- Provost: Margaret Gray-Vickrey
- Students: 3,470
- Undergraduates: 1,664
- Postgraduates: 753
- Location: Killeen, Texas, United States; 31.0528°N 97.7739°W
- Campus: Suburban, 662 acres
- Colors: Navy blue, Maroon, Silver
- Mascot: Warrior
- Website: www.tamuct.edu

Texas A&M University–Central Texas (A&M–Central Texas or TAMUCT) is a public university in Killeen, Texas, United States. It is one of the newest members of The Texas A&M University System. Founded in 1999 as a branch of Tarleton State University, it became an independent member of the Texas A&M University System in September 2009. A&M-Central Texas is an upper division college, meaning its students must complete their freshman and sophomore-level coursework at a two-year college or other institution of higher education. Texas A&M–Central Texas primarily serves non-traditional students: The average age of the student body is 34, 40% of students are affiliated with the US military, and most students attend part-time. Texas A&M–Central Texas' students are known as the Warriors, and the school colors are navy blue, maroon, and silver. The university has a main campus, an extension building in north Killeen, and a site location on the United States Army post at Fort Hood.

== History ==
=== Founding ===
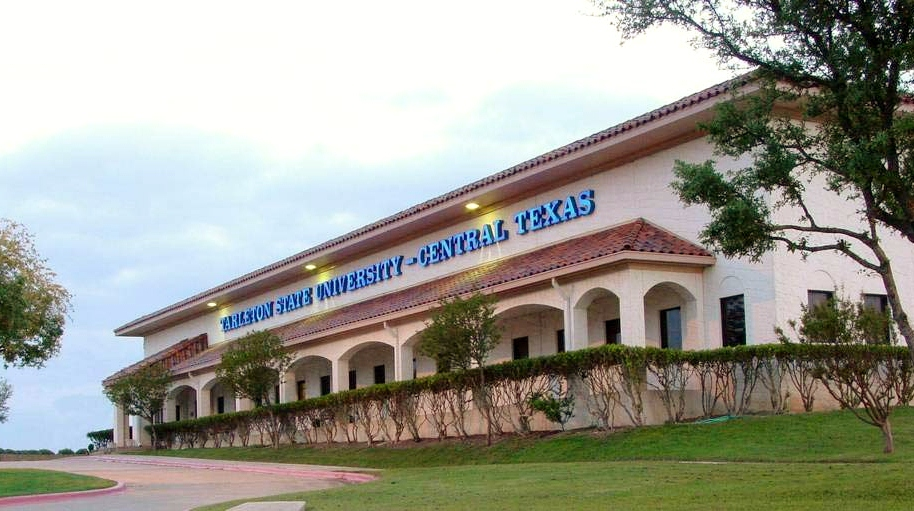
The old main campus building, formerly used by the University of Central Texas, Tarleton State University-Central Texas, and Texas A&M University-Central Texas

Following the founding of Central Texas College in Killeen in the late 1960s, local citizens sought to establish an upper division college to meet the demand for a four-year, degree-granting institution. As a result, American Technological University (ATU), a private institution, was founded in September 1973. ATU initially concentrated on technological programs, but the university gradually shifted its focus to the liberal arts, counseling psychology, and criminal justice. Because of its changed academic offerings, ATU changed its name in 1989 to the University of Central Texas (UCT). UCT subsequently experienced substantial growth, doubling its enrollment from 500 students in 1988 to over 1,000 in 1997, and moved to a new facility located next to Central Texas College. Despite UCT's success, local citizens still desired a state-supported university, so then-Governor George W. Bush initiated an advanced study into the need for higher education in the Killeen area. To that end, the Central Texas University Task Force (CTUTF) was created in 1995, and their work resulted in several recommendations: Primarily, the CTUTF recommended that Central Texas College should remain intact, UCT should dissolve and turn over its assets to the state, and Tarleton State University should establish a campus in Killeen and offer junior-, senior-, and graduate-level courses. These recommendations were accepted, and Tarleton State University–Central Texas opened in 1999. As a result of the Texas Higher Education Coordinating Board's "Pathway Model" of continuous improvement, legislation was put forth in 2009 in the Texas legislature to establish a stand-alone state university in Killeen. On May 27, 2009, Governor Rick Perry signed Senate Bill 629, officially establishing Texas A&M University–Central Texas.

=== Administration ===
Following a nationwide search conducted by the Texas A&M University System Board of Regents, Dr. Marc A. Nigliazzo was appointed in April 2010 as A&M-Central Texas' inaugural president. Dr. Nigliazzo previously served as the president of Galveston College, Temple College, and Arizona Western College. Dr. Nigliazzo's official inauguration and investiture ceremony was held on January 19, 2012. On July 22, 2011, the Board of Regents appointed Dr. Margaret "Peg" Gray-Vickrey as the university's provost and vice president for academic and student affairs. Dr. Gray-Vickrey came to TAMUCT from Florida Gulf Coast University (FGCU), where she served as provost and vice president, among many other positions. Dr. Gray-Vickrey was selected in part because of her experience in helping to develop FGCU and guide its substantial growth in the 2000s, a feat which A&M-Central Texas is currently attempting to replicate. On July 2, 2012, the university announced the hiring of Dr. Russell Porter, a former United States Air Force captain, as the associate vice president of graduate studies and research. He was promoted to Associate Provost the following year. In 2016, Dr. Porter was promoted to Vice President for Research and Economic Development to concentrate on Research, Economic Development and the planning for a university research park. Graduate Studies was turned over to Dr. Kellie Cude, Director of the Graduate School at the time. Dr. Cude was promoted to Dean of the Graduate School, and is now the Associate Provost and Senior Associate Vice President for Academic Affairs.

== Accreditation ==
Texas A&M–Central Texas became a stand-alone university on May 27, 2009, as a member of the Texas A&M University System. Since that time, SACS/COC has recognized it as an entity of its parent university, Tarleton State University, and all degrees awarded have been accredited. On June 20, 2013, Texas A&M University–Central Texas was officially awarded separate "accredited membership" status and is an accredited member of the COC, retroactive to January 1, 2013. Separate accreditation will allow the university to diversify and expand its program and course offerings, and address the regional upper-level education needs.

== Academics ==
Texas A&M–Central Texas offers 38 bachelor's degrees, 17 master's degrees, and several professional certifications in a variety of in-demand subjects. The university's academic structure is organized into three schools: Arts and Sciences, Business Administration, and Education.

=== College of Arts and Sciences ===
The College of Arts and Sciences offers degrees in the humanities, as well as mathematics, political science, social work, and sociology. Of particular note is the history program's focus in national security studies/military history, which is considered highly desirable by the personnel of nearby Fort Hood. In support of this subject's importance to the local community, the history department holds an annual Military History Symposium in cooperation with the University of North Texas' Military History Center and Fort Hood. The school's mathematics program is also noteworthy, as Dr. Chris Thron, Assistant Professor of Mathematics, was awarded a Fulbright teaching fellowship in spring 2012 for the year 2013, his second such award.

=== College of Business Administration ===
The College of Business Administration offers degree programs in accounting, finance, and economics; management, marketing, and human resource management; computer information systems and computer science; and aviation science. Several of the school's programs are accredited by the Accreditation Council for Business Schools and Programs. the university's business programs recently received accreditation from the AACSB. The school's aviation science department is especially noteworthy because it is the only public-assisted, four-year aviation program in Texas. Many graduates of the program are currently serving as pilots and aviation managers for regional and national airlines, the US military, and private charter companies. Also noteworthy is the BBA HRM program, which was aligned with the Society for Human Resource Management (SHRM) in February 2018. SHRM alignment provides an early pathway to SHRM-CP certification for qualifying students.

=== College of Education and Human Development ===
The College of Education offers degrees in education, curriculum and instruction, educational leadership, and administration, experimental psychology, counseling psychology, and marriage and family therapy. Additionally, the school offers principal and teacher certifications, as well as professional certifications and licenses for psychologists. The psychology department operates the Community Counseling and Family Therapy Center at Texas A&M–Central Texas' extension building in north Killeen. The center offers counseling services free of charge to university students, faculty, and staff, and to members of the local community at a low cost, based on family income. Both the counseling center and the psychology department are especially important to the Killeen/Fort Hood area, as many local citizens suffer from post-traumatic stress disorder and/or traumatic brain injury relating to military service.

== Campus ==
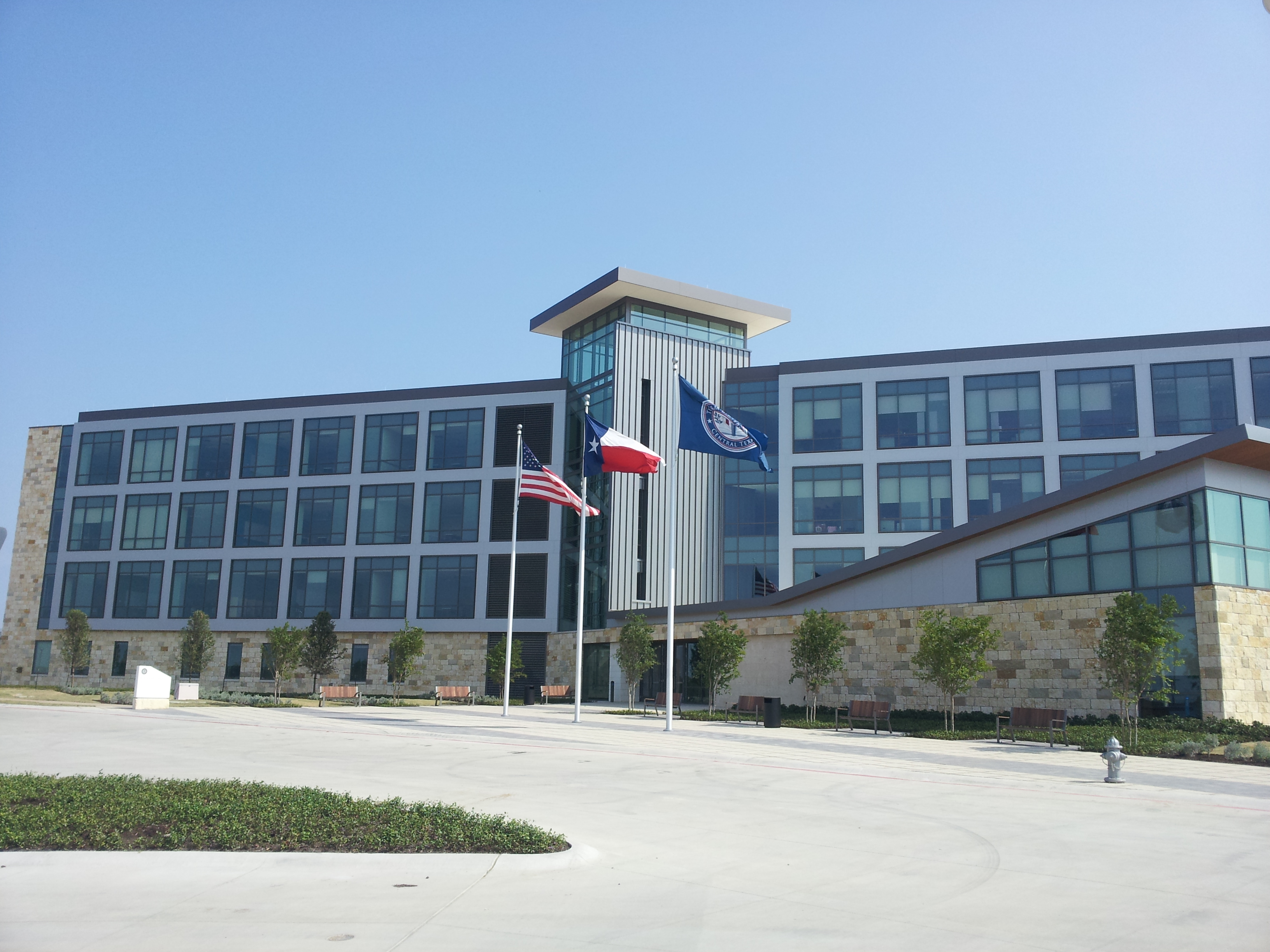
Founder's Hall viewed from the north

In May 2009, 662 acres (2.68 km^{2}) of the Fort Hood military reservation were donated to the university by the U.S. Army. The donated land is currently being used to develop the university's new permanent main campus, located near the intersection of State Highway 195 and State Highway 201 near the Killeen–Ft. Hood Regional Airport, formerly known as Gray Army Airfield. Construction of Founder's Hall, Texas A&M–Central Texas' first permanent building on the new campus site, began on August 26, 2010, and the grand opening ceremony was held on May 24, 2012. The $40 million, 103,000 square feet (9,600 m^{2}) building has classroom space, a lecture hall, student services, enrollment services, administrative offices, support services, and a campus bookstore. On the same day Founder's Hall was opened, the university broke ground on its second building. Given the name of Warrior's Hall, this building is a $50-million, 125,500-square-foot (11,660 m^{2}) mixed-use facility that includes a two-story library.

The proposed full build out of TAMU-CT's main campus

Overall future campus development will include 19 academic buildings totaling 1,600,000 square feet (150,000 m^{2}), four general-use buildings totaling 325,000 square feet (30,200 m^{2}), a student union recreation/wellness center, a conference center, a dining hall, 1,800 beds of student housing in five phases, athletic and recreation facilities, a 30,000-person-capacity football stadium, a 10,000-person-capacity baseball field, an 8,000-person-capacity indoor arena, 22 acres (0.089 km^{2}) of outdoor recreation space (soccer, track, tennis, softball, etc.), and parking for 6,000 cars. The university has been dubbed the second-largest economic development to occur in the region only behind the establishment of Fort Hood.

== Student body ==
Undergraduate demographics as of Fall 2023
Race and ethnicity	Total
White	36%
Hispanic	31%
Black	23%
Asian	5%
Two or more races	2%
Unknown	2%
Native Hawaiian/Pacific Islander	1%
Economic diversity
Low-income (Note: The percentage of students who received an income-based federal Pell grant intended for low-income students.)	49%
Affluent (Note: The percentage of students who are a part of the American middle class at the bare minimum.)	51%

Texas A&M–Central Texas primarily serves nontraditional students: The average age of the students is 34, 40% of students are affiliated with the US military (either active-duty military, military dependents, or veterans), and most students attend part-time. Texas A&M–Central Texas' students are known as the Warriors. About 70% of the students are undergraduates, with the remaining 30% being graduate students. The undergraduate enrollment is among the most diverse in the Texas A&M University System (50% White non-Hispanic, 28% African American, 16% Hispanic, 3% Asian and Pacific Islander, 1% American Indian, and 2% other).
