= Saint Anthony College of Nursing =

Private college in Rockford, Illinois, US

- Type: Private nursing school
- Established: 1915
- President: Charlene S. Aaron
- Dean: Beth M. Carson
- Students: 242
- Location: Rockford, Illinois, United States
- Website: www.sacn.edu

The Saint Anthony College of Nursing is a private nursing school affiliated with OSF Saint Anthony Medical Center and located in Rockford, Illinois.

== See also ==
- List of nursing schools in the United States
