= Trinity College of Nursing and Health Sciences =

Private college in Rock Island, Illinois, US

Coordinates: 41.4849°N 90.5689°W

- Seal of Trinity College of Nursing and Health Sciences
- Type: Private
- Established: 1994
- Accreditation: Higher Learning Commission; Commission on Collegiate Nursing Education
- Undergraduates: 59
- Postgraduates: 17
- Location: 2122 25th Avenue, Rock Island, Illinois, 61201, United States
- Website: www.trinitycollegeqc.edu

Trinity College of Nursing and Health Sciences is an American nursing school located in Rock Island. Illinois. It was established in 1994 from the merger of three nursing schools and hospital systems, dating back to 1898.

== History ==
Trinity College of Nursing and Health Sciences is a private nursing school that was established in Rock Island, Illinois in 1994. However, its history traces back to the Moline Public School of Nursing which opened in Moline, Illinois in 1898; the St. Anthony's Hospital School of Nursing, which opened in 1899, and the Lutheran Hospital School for Nurses, which opened in Moline, Illinois, in 1916.

Moline Public School of Nursing and Lutheran Hospital School for Nurses merged to form United Medical Center in 1989. At the same time, this merger established the United Medical Center School of Nursing and United Medical Center Schools of Allied Health. Trinity Medical Center formed from the merger of United Medical Center and the Franciscan Hospital of Rock Island on October 1, 1992. This merger established Trinity Medical Center School of Nursing and Trinity Medical Center Schools of Allied Health.

Its name became Trinity College of Nursing and Health Sciences in 1994, marking the transition into a degree offering institution. Its founding president was Jo Ellen Sharer, former director of the school of nursing at Moline Public School of Nursing.

Trinity College of Nursing and Health Sciences was accredited by the Higher Learning Commission in 1998. In 2002, the combined institutions had more than 6,000 alumni of the nursing program.

On December 22, 2025, Trinity College and Augustana College announced plans for Augustana to acquire Trinity on June 30, 2026, pending regulatory approval.

== Campus ==
Trinity College of Nursing and Health Sciences was originally housed in the former Moline Public School of Nursing at 555 6th Street in Moline. Illinois. It February 2003, it announced plans for a $1.8 million 23,000 square foot structure on the Trinity Medical Center's west campus in Rock Island, Illinois. The new campus, located at 2122 25th Avenue in Rock Island, opened in the fall of 2003.

== Academics ==
Trinity College of Nursing and Health Sciences offers a two-year associate degree, a four-year bachelor's degree, and a master's degree in nursing. It also awards an Associate of Applied Science degree in radiography. U.S. News & World Report ranked Trinity College of Nursing and Health Sciences is #427 amongst American nursing schools for 2026.

Trinity College of Nursing and Health Sciences is accredited by the Higher Learning Commission, the Joint Review Committee on Education in Radiologic Technology (Associate of Applied Science in radiography), and the Commission on Collegiate Nursing Education (baccalaureate in nursing and Master's in nursing).

The college has a chapter of Sigma Theta Tau honor society for nursing and of Phi Theta Kappa honor society.

== Students ==
In 2024, Trinity College of Nursing and Health Sciences had 59 undergraduate students and 17 graduate students, for a total of 76 students. Of those students, 95 percent are female and 5 percent are male. In addition, 63 percent are White, 15 percent are Hispanic, 8 percent are Black, 8 percent are two or more races, and 5 percent are unknown.

== See also ==
- List of nursing schools in the United States
