= Saint Francis Medical Center College of Nursing =

Nursing school in Peoria, Illinois, US

Coordinates: 40.7013°N 89.5902°W

- Type: Private
- Established: November 1985
- Accreditation: Commission on Collegiate Nursing Education
- Location: 511 East Greenleaf Street, Peoria, Illinois, 61603, United States
- Campus: Urban
- Website: www.osfhealthcare.org/education/saint-francis-medical-center-college-of-nursing

Saint Francis Medical Center College of Nursing is an American two-year private nursing school located in Peoria, Illinois. It was established in 1985. The college offers bachelor's, master's, and doctoral degrees.

== History ==
Saint Francis Medical Center College of Nursing is a private nursing school founded in 1985. However, originated as the St. Francis Hospital School of Nursing in 1905, founded by the Sisters of the Third Order of St. Francis in Peoria, Illinois to train the sisters in nursing. The State of Illinois approved the school's diploma program in 1915. Three years later, in 1918, the nursing school opened to lay students.

The St. Francis Hospital School of Nursing was accredited by the National League for Nursing in 1950. However, it graduated its last class in 1987, after graduating some 3,400 students through its diploma program.

Saint Francis Medical Center College of Nursing was established as a baccalaureate institution in November 1985, approved by the State of Illinois. Its first students enrolled in August 1986, and graduated in May 1988. The college added its Master of Science in nursing degree in 2000. This was followed by a Doctor of Nursing Practice degree in 2009.

== Campus ==
Saint Francis Medical Center College of Nursing is located in an urban setting in Peoria, Illinois, adjacent to the OSF Saint Francis Medical Center. Its address is 511 East Greenleaf Street in Peoria, Illinois 61603.

== Academics ==
Saint Francis Medical Center College of Nursing is accredited by the Commission on Collegiate Nursing Education. In 2026, U.S. News & World Report ranked the college 385 for nursing schools.

Saint Francis Medical Center College of Nursing offers a certificate and bachelor's, master's, and doctoral degrees. Its four-year nursing program is affiliated with Monmouth College.

In the fall of 2024, the college had 273 undergraduate students and 332 graduate students. These included 85 percent females and 15 percent males. Of that, 85 percent were white, 5 percent were Black, 5 percent were Hispanic, and 3 percent were Asian. Fifteen percent of the students live on campus.

The college has a chapter of the Sigma Theta Tau international honor society for nursing.

== See also ==
- List of nursing schools in the United States
