= Blessing-Rieman College of Nursing and Health Sciences =

Private college in Quincy, Illinois, US

- Seal of Blessing-Rieman College of Nursing and Health Sciences
- Other names: Seal of Blessing-Rieman College of Nursing and Health Sciences
- Former names: Blessing Hospital Training School; Blessing Training School for Nurses; Blessing-Rieman College of Nursing
- Type: Private
- Established: 1891
- Accreditation: National League for Nursing Accrediting Commission
- Students: 195
- Location: 3609 North Marx Drive, Quincy, Illinois, 62305, United States; 39°56′09″N 91°23′54″W
- Campus: Urban
- Website: www.brcn.edu

Blessing-Rieman College of Nursing and Health Sciences is an American private non-profit college in Quincy, Illinois. The college was established in 1891 as a school for women that was associated with Blessing Hospital. The college offers associate's and bachelor's degrees, with an emphasis in nursing. It is accredited by the Collegiate Commission on Nursing Education and the National League for Nursing Accrediting Commission.

== History ==
Blessing-Rieman College of Nursing and Health Sciences was established in 1891 as a private, non-profit college in Quincy, Illinois. It was originally called the Blessing Hospital Training School and offered a three-year degree for women that included practical and theoretical instruction.

It was later known as the Blessing Training School for Nurses and the Blessing-Rieman College of Nursing.

The college is affiliated with Culver–Stockton College and Quincy University.

== Campus ==
Blessing-Rieman College of Nursing and Health Sciences is located in Quincy, Illinois. It has an urban setting. Its address in 3609 North Marx Drive in Quincy, Illinois 62305.

== Academics ==
Blessing-Rieman College of Nursing and Health Sciences' emphasis is on nursing. It is accredited by the Collegiate Commission on Nursing Education and the National League for Nursing Accrediting Commission. In 2026, U.S. News & World Report ranked it 624 of 686 nursing schools.

It has programs for RN, BSN, and LPN, as well as a Master of Science in nursing.. The college offers associates, bachelor's degrees, and master's degrees in nursing.

In 2025, it had 195 students, including ten graduate students. Those students included 92 percent females and 8 percent males. Ninety percent of its students were white. Most students commute to campus.

The college has a chapter of the Sigma Theta Tau international honor society for nursing.

== See also ==
- List of nursing schools in the United States
- List of smoke-free colleges and universities
