= Saint Camillus International University of Health and Medical Sciences =

Private university in Rome

Coordinates: 41.934220°N 12.602432°E

UniCamillus University
- Saint Camillus International University of Health and Medical Sciences
- Other name: UniCamillus
- Motto: In lumine tuo videbimus
- Type: Private
- Established: 28 November 2017
- Rector: Gianni Profita
- Students: 5100 (2024)
- Location: Rome, Cefalù, Venice, Italy
- Colours: Red Pantone 186 C
- Website: unicamillus.org

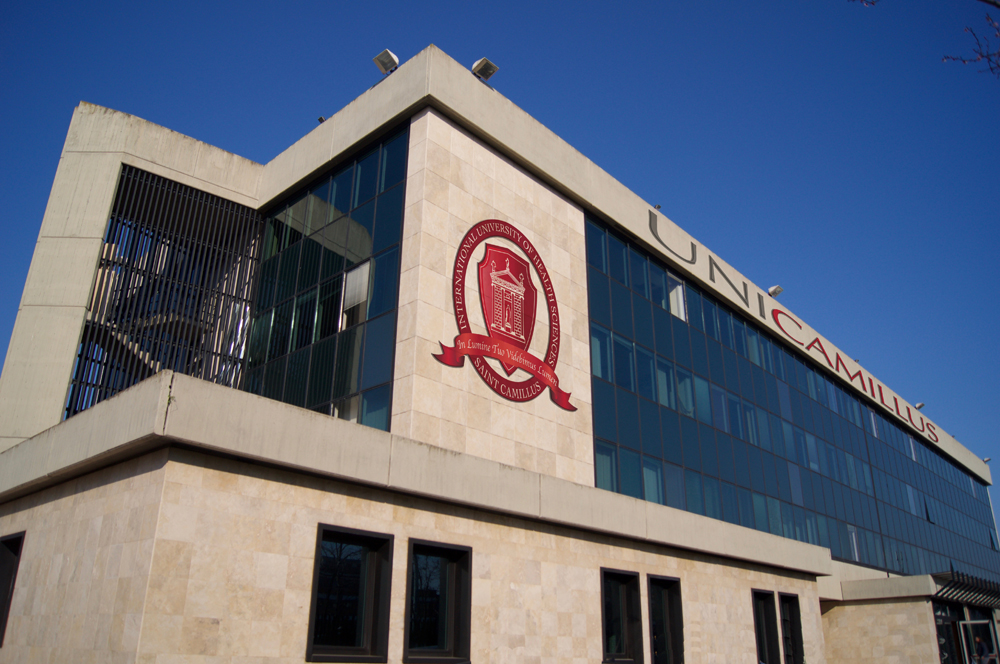

Saint Camillus International University of Health Sciences (UniCamillus) is a private Italian university recognised by the Italian Ministry of University and Research in November 2017. It is located in Rome, Cefalù and Venice.

== Profile ==
UniCamillus is dedicated exclusively to Medical Sciences and is reported to be aimed particularly at non-EU international students, as well as Italian and EU students who show a scientific and professional interest towards health issues affecting the Developing Countries (PVS).

In the vision of a humanitarian commitment that the university declares to pursue, it was also reported the signature of a memorandum of understanding with the Association of the Doctors of Foreign Origin in Italy (AMSI) and the Communities of the Arab World in Italy (Co-mai) as well as co-operation agreements with Haiti, Egypt and other non-European countries.

== Degree courses ==
The university's curricula show that the didactic programs as well as the research activities focus on the pathologies at the root of the most common health issues in the Global South such as Malaria, HIV/AIDS, Tuberculosis and Neglected Tropical Diseases, as well as the specific requirements for physicians and health professionals operating in war zones or natural disaster areas. These courses are taught in either English or Italian among many others.

- Degree Course in Medicine and Surgery
- Degree Course in Dentistry and Dental Prosthetics (in Italian)
- Three-year Degree Course in Midwifery (in Italian)
- Three-year Degree Course in Nursing
- Three-year Degree Course in Physiotherapy
- Three-year Degree Course in Biomedical Laboratory Techniques (in Italian)
- Three-year Degree Course in Radiology, Diagnostic Imaging and Radiotherapy Techniques

== Specialisation schools ==
Starting from the 2023–2024 academic year, UniCamillus established its first medical specialisation schools, expanding the postgraduate programmes available to graduates in Medicine and Surgery. For the 2024–2025 academic year, the Italian Ministry of Universities and Research accredited six healthcare specialisation schools at the university, all reserved for medical graduates.

=== Orthopaedics and Traumatology ===
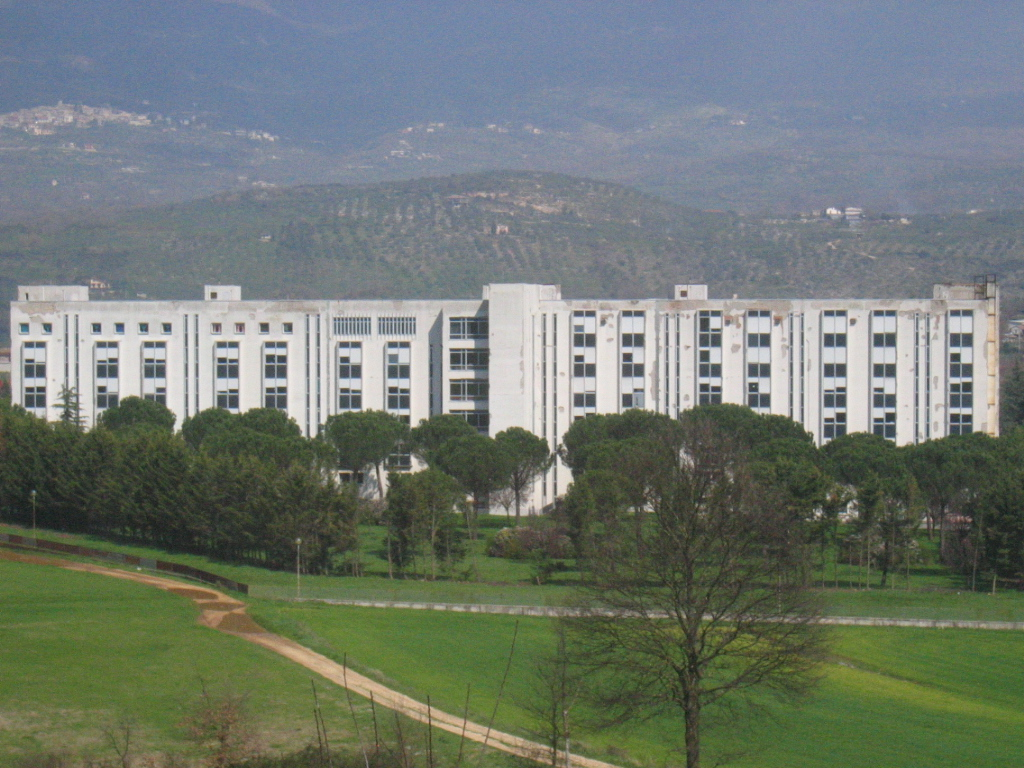
San Benedetto Hospital in Alatri, the main teaching hospital of the UniCamillus School of Orthopaedics and Traumatology

The school was established in the 2023–2024 academic year under the direction of Professor Francesco Franceschi, head of the Complex Operative Unit of Orthopaedics and Traumatology at San Pietro Fatebenefratelli Hospital in Rome, which served as the school's principal clinical site for the first three years following its establishment. During the accreditation process, hospitals in Alatri and Frosinone were already included in the training network, providing placements lasting a total of three to six months over the five-year programme. Following ministerial accreditation for the 2024–2025 academic year, Professor Matteo Guzzini became director of the school.

Until the 2025–2026 academic year, the main site remained San Pietro Fatebenefratelli Hospital in Rome, with a training network comprising San Benedetto Hospital in Alatri, the Nuova ITOR private hospital in Rome and Fabrizio Spaziani Hospital in Frosinone. From 2026, following a broader agreement between UniCamillus and the hospitals of the Province of Frosinone, the facilities in Frosinone and Alatri were recognised as meeting the requirements for the school's accreditation. Beginning with the 2026–2027 academic year, the main site became San Benedetto Hospital in Alatri, a historic hill town and comune in the Province of Frosinone, in the Lazio region of central Italy. The clinical training network also includes the Nuova ITOR private hospital in Rome and Spaziani Hospital in Frosinone.

=== Cardiac surgery ===
The school has been active since the 2024–2025 academic year and is directed by Professor Ruggero De Paulis. Its main site is the European Hospital in Rome, a private multidisciplinary acute-care hospital with cardiology and cardiac surgery departments accredited by the Regional Health Service. The hospital is part of the Garofalo Health Care Group. Aurelia Hospital in Rome is directly included in the training network. It is a private accredited hospital belonging to the same group and is equipped with an emergency department, a helipad and a first-level emergency and urgent-care department.

=== General surgery ===
The school has been active since the 2024–2025 academic year and is directed by Professor Anna Caterina Milanetto. Its main site is the Policlinico Abano Terme private hospital in Abano Terme, a spa town and comune in the Province of Padua, in the Veneto region of north-eastern Italy. Founded in 1961, the hospital is a private multidisciplinary healthcare facility accredited by the Italian National Health Service and is the principal hospital of the Leonardo Hospital Group. The training network also includes the Villa Igea private hospital in Ancona.

=== Gynaecology and obstetrics ===
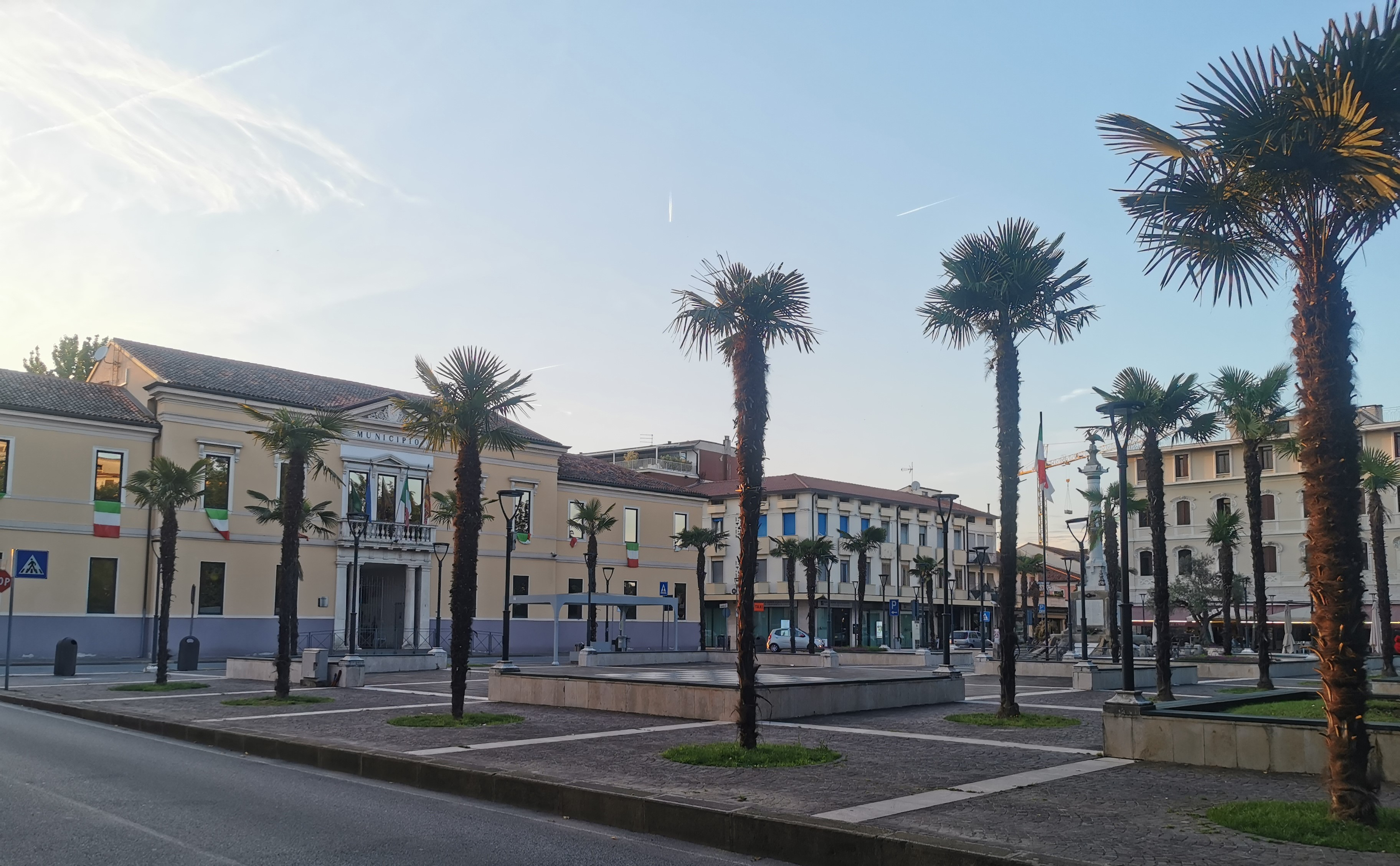
Abano Terme, a spa town in the Province of Padua and the location of the UniCamillus School of Gynaecology and Obstetrics

The school has been active since the 2024–2025 academic year and is directed by Professor Barbara Costantini. It is based at the Policlinico Abano Terme private hospital in Abano Terme, a spa town in the Province of Padua, Veneto, approximately south-west of the city of Padua in north-eastern Italy. At the hospital, the school shares its training network with the General Surgery and Urology programmes.

=== Ophthalmology ===
The school has been active since the 2024–2025 academic year and is directed by Professor Mariacristina Parravano. Its main site is the G.B. Bietti Foundation IRCCS in Rome, a scientific research and healthcare institute specialising in the research and treatment of eye diseases. Unlike the other UniCamillus specialisation schools, the programme lasts four years rather than five.

=== Urology ===
The school has been active since the 2024–2025 academic year and is directed by Professor Luigi Schips. Its main site is the Policlinico Abano Terme private hospital in Abano Terme, a spa town and comune in the Province of Padua, Veneto, in north-eastern Italy.
