= Oak Point University =

Private university in Chicago, Illinois, US

- Former names: West Suburban Hospital School for Nurses; West Suburban Hospital School of Nursing; Concordia-West Suburban College of Nursing; West Suburban College of Nursing; Resurrection University
- Type: Private university
- Active: 1914–April 19, 2024
- President: Therese A. Scanlan
- Students: 914 (as of November 2017)
- Undergraduates: 812 (as of November 2017)
- Postgraduates: 102 (as of November 2017)
- Location: Chicago, Illinois, U.S. 41.907257°N 87.685302°W
- Website: oakpoint.edu

Oak Point University, formerly Resurrection University, was a private university in Chicago, Illinois. It was founded on February 17, 1914, and had two colleges, a college of nursing and a college of health sciences, and offered undergraduate and graduate/professional programs in the health sciences with a significant focus on nursing. The university has over 5,600 university alumni. There were two campus locations, one in Wicker Park and one in Oak Brook. The university closed at the end of the spring 2024 semester on April 19, 2024.

The university experienced a dramatic decline in enrollment since the pandemic. In fall 2022, it had 429 students, down from 860 in fall 2019, according to federal data.

== History ==
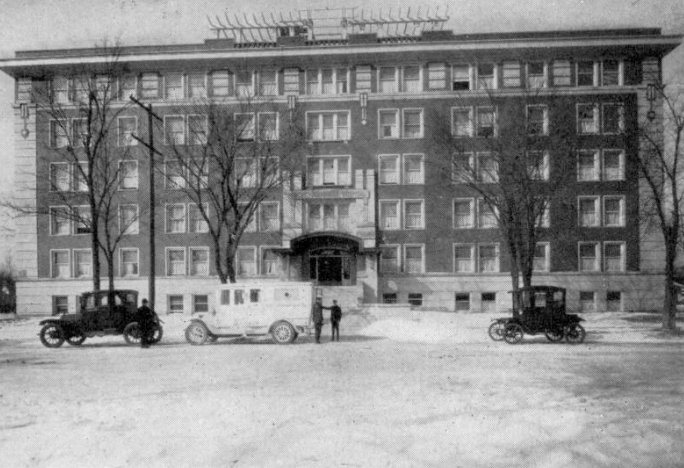
West Suburban Hospital, 506 North Austin Ave. in 1922

In 1914, Oak Point University, originally named West Suburban Hospital School for Nurses was founded with the West Suburban Hospital that began serving the Oak Park community on February 11, 1914. The school officially began on February 17, offering a diploma program. In 1925, a new building was completed for the school on the 7th floor of the medical center, providing students with classrooms, laboratories, dormitories, swimming pool, and a ballroom.

In 1946, the West Suburban Hospital for Nurses entered into an affiliation with Wheaton College that lasted until 1982 In 1953, the name of the school was changed to West Suburban Hospital School of Nursing.

The university was recognized by the Illinois Board of Higher Education in 1981, giving degree granting and operating authority to offer a nursing degree. The following year, the Baccalaureate Nursing Program established, including a generic and Registered Nurse completion option.

In 1985, the university entered into an affiliation with Concordia College (now Concordia University Chicago). Again, the name was changed to: Concordia-West Suburban College of Nursing. In 2003, the affiliation with Concordia College ended and the name was revised to West Suburban College of Nursing.

In 2004, Resurrection Health Care purchased West Suburban Medical Center and the College of Nursing. West Suburban College of Nursing became a part of Resurrection Health Care.

In 2008, the Higher Learning Commission approved the baccalaureate degrees of health informatics and health administration. That same year, the Master of Science in Nursing program became accredited at the university and the first class to graduate with the MSN degree occurred in 2009.

In 2010, West Suburban College of Nursing became Resurrection University with a College of Nursing and a College of Health Sciences. The following year, Resurrection Health Care and Provena Health joined to form Presence Health.

In 2012, Resurrection University and Concordia University Chicago reestablish the nursing degree program partnership and the university moved to the campus of Saint Elizabeth Medical Center in the Wicker Park neighborhood of Chicago.

In 2014, the College of Nursing celebrated its 100-year anniversary.

2015: The Saint Francis School of Radiography (SFSOR), was merged with the university, which now offered a Bachelor of Science in Imaging Technology (B.S.I.T.) in the College of Health Sciences. The degree is accredited by the Joint Review Committee on Education in Radiologic Technology (JRCERT).

2016: Dr. Therese Scanlan assumed the role of President for Resurrection University.

2017: The university's Doctor of Nursing Practice program began in the fall semester.

2018: In March, the affiliation between Resurrection University and Presence Health ended, and Presence Legacy Association became a member of Resurrection University.

2021: Resurrection University became an independent university and changed its name to Oak Point University.

2021: Oak Point University added a second campus in Oak Brook, Illinois.

2021: The university added two new Master of Science in Nursing nurse practitioner/post-graduate certificate programs: Adult-Gerontology Acute Care (AGACNP) and Psychiatric-Mental Health (PMHNP).

2024: The university abruptly announced plans to close at the end of the spring 2024 semester on April 19, three weeks before the end of said semester. Lewis University helped Oak Point University students complete their degrees.

== Academics ==
The university had two colleges: the College of Nursing and the College of Allied Health. It was institutionally accredited by the Higher Learning Commission (HLC). Many programs were accredited by specific accreditation agencies, including:

- Commission on Accreditation for Health Informatics & Information Management (CAHIIM)
- Commission on Collegiate Nursing Education (CCNE)
- Joint Review Committee on Education of Radiologic Technologists (JRCERT)
