= List of nursing schools in Malaysia =

Malaysia has many nursing schools, both public and private.

== Private nursing schools ==
- Kuala Lumpur
  - International Medical University
  - Tung Shin Academy Of Nursing
- Perak
  - Lake View College (Formerly known as Bukit Merah Laketown Institute Of Allied Health Sciences)
- Negeri Sembilan
  - International Institute of Science Mantin (IASM)
  - Murni College
- Penang
  - Adventist College of Nursing and Health Sciences
  - Lam Wah Ee Nursing College
- Selangor
  - Universiti Tunku Abdul Rahman Faculty of Medicine and Health Sciences
  - Assunta College of Nursing (Formerly known as Tun Tan Cheng Lock College of Nursing)
  - International Medical College (Formerly known as Pantai College of Nursing & Health Science)
  - Sime Darby Nursing and Health Sciences College (Formerly known as SJMC Academy of Nursing and Health Sciences)
  - International University College of Nursing (IUCN)
  - Noble Care Malaysia

== Public nursing schools ==
- Johor
  - Hospital Muar Nursing College
  - Hospital Sultanah Aminah Nursing College
- Kedah
  - Hospital Alor Star Nursing College
  - Hospital Sungai Petani Nursing College
- Kelantan
  - Kubang Kerian Nursing College
- Melaka
  - Hospital Melaka Nursing College
- Negeri Sembilan
  - Hospital Seremban Nursing College
- Pahang
  - Hospital Tengku Ampuan Afzan Nursing College
  - International Islamic University Malaysia
- Penang
  - Hospital Bukit Mertajam Nursing College
  - Hospital Pulau Pinang Nursing College
- Perak
  - Hospital Taiping Nursing College
  - Ipoh Nursing College
- Sabah
  - Hospital Duchess of Kent Nursing College
  - Hospital Queen Elizabeth Nursing College
- Sarawak
  - Sibu Nursing College
- Terengganu
  - Hospital Kuala Terengganu Nursing College

== See also ==
- Healthcare in Malaysia
