= Nurse education =

Training of nurses

Nurse education consists of the theoretical and practical preparation of nurses for professional practice. It is provided to student nurses by experienced nurses and other health professionals who are qualified or experienced educators, traditionally in a type of professional school known as a nursing school or college of nursing.

Pre-qualification education is typically offered at the diploma or bachelor’s degree level. Depending on the country, programs may prepare students for general nursing or a specialty such as mental health nursing or pediatric nursing. Nurse education commonly continues after graduation through post-qualification courses in specialist subjects such as postoperative care.

== Historical background ==
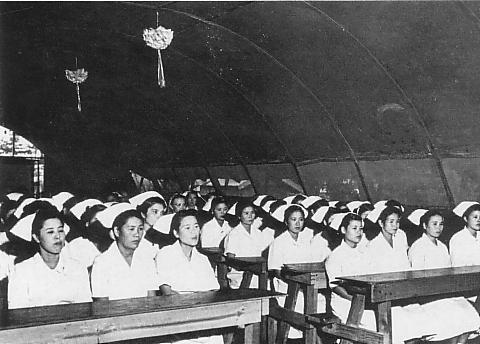
Nurses at Okinawa Central Hospital Nursing School in 1946

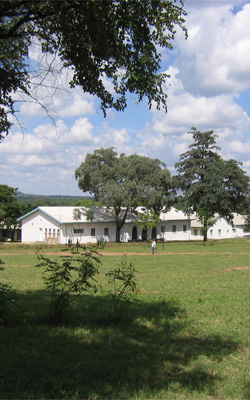
The nursing school at Karanda Mission Hospital, Zimbabwe

Nurse education was traditionally delivered through an apprenticeship, often undertaken in religious institutes such as convents by young women (although there has always been a proportion of male nurses, especially in mental health services). Over time an emphasis on evidence-based practice has replaced the more ritualistic practical training structure with a more academic pathway.

=== Early development ===
In 1859, Valérie de Gasparin and her husband Agénor de Gasparin opened the first nursing school in the world in Lausanne, Switzerland.

Florence Nightingale was one of the pioneers in establishing the idea of nursing schools from her base at St Thomas' Hospital, London in 1860 when she opened the 'Nightingale Training School for Nurses', now part of King's College London. Her intention was to train nurses to a qualified and specialized level, with the key aim of learning to develop observation skills and sensitivity to patient needs, then allow them to work in hospital posts across the United Kingdom and abroad. Her influence flourished and nursing is now a course taught at a number of British universities.

In 1873, the Bellevue Hospital School of Nursing, of New York City, was founded. It was the first school of nursing in the United States to be founded on the principles of nursing established by Florence Nightingale. The School operated at Bellevue Hospital until its closure in 1969.

Some other nurses at that time, notably Ethel Gordon Fenwick, were in favor of formalized nursing registration and curricula that were formally based in higher education and not within the confines of hospitals.

Rebecca Strong OBE (1843–1944) started a Preliminary Training School for Nurses at the Glasgow Royal Infirmary in 1893. She had been working as a Matron there since 1879. This 'block apprenticeship' programme had separate classroom based teaching and practical periods on the wards. Two courses were arranged in conjunction with the Professors of St. Mungo's College - a three-month course consisting of elementary Anatomy, Physiology and Hygiene. If these exams were passed a second course was given which consisted of Medicine, Surgery and Practical Nursing. The prospective nurse was then able to enter the hospital with this theoretical knowledge. Strong was supported by the pioneering surgeon Sir William Macewen.

Eva Luckes, Matron of The London Hospital (1880–1919) was mentored by Florence Nightingale, and was her friend and disciple.Eva Luckes was another innovator in nurse training and education and introduced the Preliminary Training School concept to England in 1895. This was adopted as an element of mandatory training programme following the 1919 Nurse Registration Act. Eva Luckes produced over 470 matrons who filled posts at home and abroad, including three who filled the top positions in Military Nursing, Ethel Becher, Sarah Oram and Maud McCarthy. Luckes's other matrons also spread her style of "Nightingale nursing" to voluntary hospitals and infirmaries both in the provinces and London. They included Annie McIntosh, Matron of St Bartholomew's Hospital, 1910–1927.

=== Academicisation and independent nursing schools ===
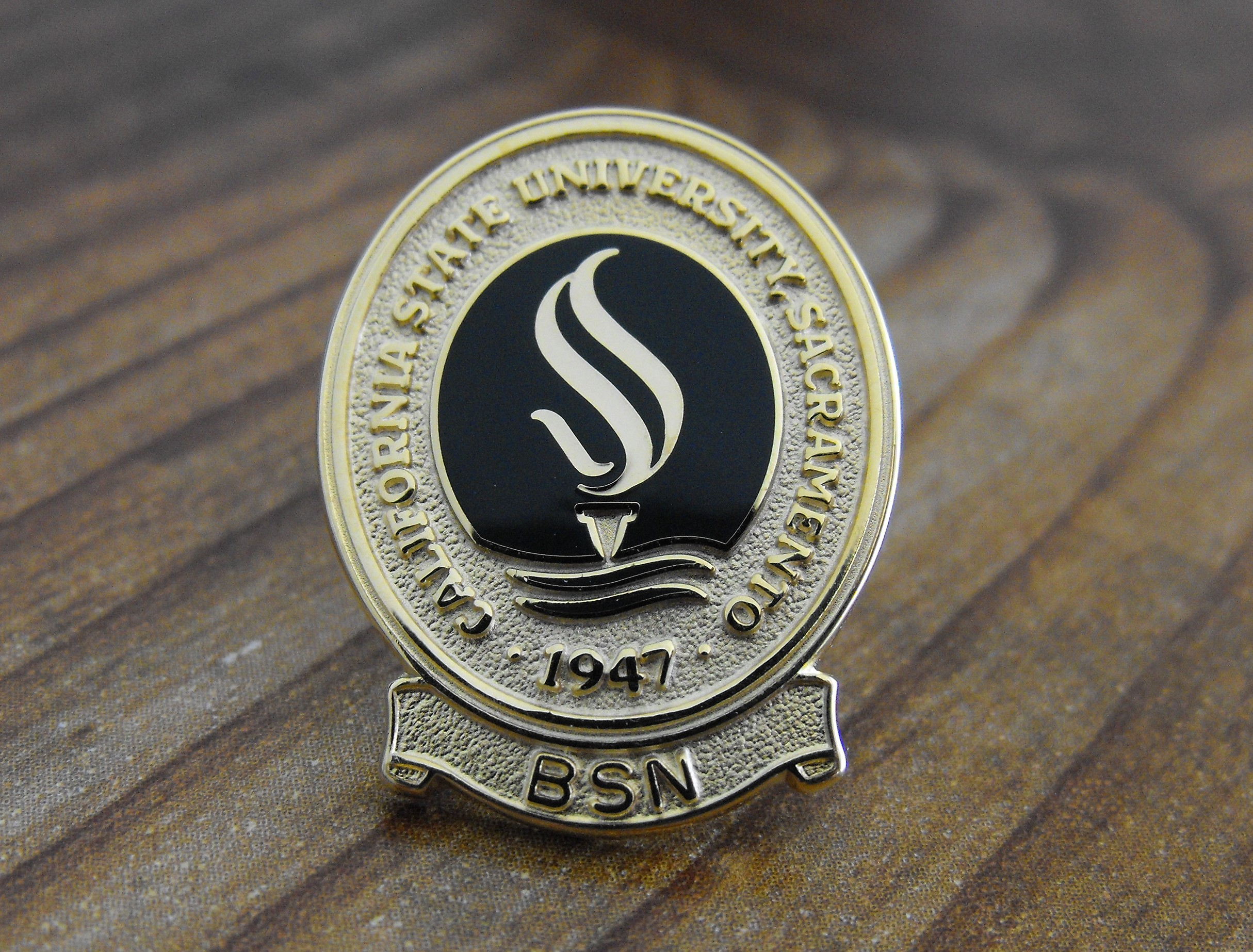
The nursing pin awarded to graduates of the nursing school at Sacramento State University in the USA.

In 1909, the University of Minnesota offered the first university based nursing program. It offered the first Bachelor of Science in Nursing degree and graduated the first bachelor's degree educated nurse. Yale School of Nursing became the first autonomous school of nursing in the United States in 1923.

The first international postgraduate courses for nurses in the UK commenced in 1920. This was a joint initiative with the League of Red Cross Societies, The College of Nursing, the International Council of Nurses, The University of London, the Rockefeller Foundation and nursing leaders in North America. The first course was on public health nursing with a course on Hospital Administrators and Teachers in Schools of Nursing commencing in 1925. The course ran for one year at King's College for Women, Campden Hill, London before moving to Bedford College for Women.

In November 1955, a World Health Organization (WHO) study group on the education of nurses met in Brussels and made several recommendations, including that "At least one experimental school of nursing be set up in each country." In the UK, the first department of Nursing Studies at the University of Edinburgh was established in 1956, with a five-year integrated degree programme introduced in 1960. Several other universities across the UK during the 1960s. In 1974 La Trobe University commenced the first nursing course in Australia.

In 1956, the Columbia University School of Nursing became the first in the United States to grant a master's degree in a clinical nursing specialty.

Apart from the nursing school of King's College London, the direct descendant of Nightingale's school, the University of Manchester was one of the first English institutions to offer the course at degree level. A new building for the Manchester Medical School was opened in the early 1970s and degree courses in nursing were established about the same time. Nursing education at the university expanded greatly in 1996 when a new School of Nursing and Midwifery was created by transferring the Manchester College of Midwifery and Nursing into the university's Faculty of Medicine, Dentistry and Nursing.

Nursing education in the United Kingdom was significantly influenced by the Briggs Report of 1972. This set a new agenda for nursing and nurse education and sought to develop a career progression away from the bedside into education, management and research. In addition, the 1979 Nurses, Midwives and Health Visitors Act provided the legal mechanism for change. This saw a gradual movement away from practice-based training towards a college-based system of education, from the nurse apprentice to the supernumerary nurse.

== Scope ==
Nursing education includes instruction in topic areas. These are nursing assessment, nursing diagnosis, and nursing care planning. In the United States, nursing students learn through traditional classroom and lab instruction. Nursing education also involves clinical rotations and simulation, throughout their schooling, to develop care planning and clinical reasoning. At the end of schooling, nursing students in the US and Canada must take and pass the NCLEX (National Council of Licensure Examination) to practice. Simulation is a version of some actual instruments or working conditions designed to illustrate some behavioral dimensions of a physical or abstract system via the behavior of another system. The main goal of simulation in healthcare is to prepare students to face clinical situations, increase patients' safety, reduce errors, and improve nurses' clinical judgments. Simulation as a teaching method includes activities that mock an actual clinical environment and has been designed to illustrate processes, decision-making, and critical thinking via techniques such as role-play or instruments like educational films and models, scenarios, and case studies.

Medical simulation and hands on learning are common among nursing education practices. Some nursing schools will carry out hands on demonstrations and practice so that future nurses can learn skills like how to administer specific medications and care for specific patients such as the skills taught in an opioid care training course. While it is clear that the use of Medical simulation in nursing education is important for improving practice, patient safety, and interprofessional team skills, the balance of simulation to clinical time remains in the hands of the institutions.

Although nurses tend to spend a lot of time in nursing school doing simulation and clinical learning, they also spend time in the classroom learning about the care that they will eventually give. This includes both broad science courses as well as very specific courses such as a course specifically about how to better care for addiction patients.

Additionally, newer curriculums within nursing education are requiring future nurses to be educated on patient and workforce diversity. A large step in increasing diversity within nursing is through education. Several research studies have shown diverse patient populations cycle through hospitals on a regular basis and a patient's needs are never the same. It is a nurse's job to cater to their needs, and ensure the patient is being treated well. During their education, nurses will master the practice of engaging, communicating, and treating unique patient populations, while working with diverse coworkers.

== Nursing qualifications by country ==
=== United Kingdom ===
Pre-registration nurse training and education in the UK is now via a bachelor's degree (a UK Level 6 qualification) or a 2-year pre-registration master's degree at level 7, following the phasing-out of the Diploma of Higher Education (a UK Level 5 qualification) in Nursing which was previously offered at universities and colleges.

To become a student nurse, individuals must apply through the university and Colleges Admissions Service (commonly referred to as "UCAS") to their nursing degree choices, choosing from one of the four nursing fields: Adult, Children, Mental Health and Learning Disabilities. Requirements for entry to a pre-reg nursing degree are usually five GCSEs (including mathematics, English language and at least one science subject) at Grade C or above, along with three A-Level subjects (preferably but not essentially science-based) at Grade C or above, although the majority of universities will seek higher grades due to the competition for places. Key Skills courses are generally no-longer accepted as an alternative to GCSEs, however science or healthcare-based BTEC Level 3 Extended Diplomas and Access courses are most often accepted in lieu of A-Level qualifications.

If successful following interview, the student will study a "core" first year, learning basic nursing competencies essential to all four of the above fields. It is then from second year and onwards that the degree will begin to focus on the student's chosen field. Following completion of the degree, the applicant will be registered with the Nursing and Midwifery Council (NMC) as a Registered Nurse in their field of practice, using the post-nominal RNA, RNC, RNMH or RNLD as appropriate to their degree qualification.

=== United States ===
Early nursing schools offered non-degree courses, which remain today as Certified Nursing Assistant (CNA) or a Licensed Practical Nurse (LPN) certificates or diplomas. Community colleges began offering an Associate of Science in Nursing degree, and some diploma programs switched to this model. Universities then began to offer Bachelor of Science in Nursing and Bachelor of Nursing degrees, followed by Master of Science in Nursing degrees, and Doctor of Nursing Practice degrees. A Doctor of Philosophy Degree in Nursing (PhD) is also available, although this degree tends to focuses more on research than hands-on patient care.

Pre-requisites often include math, English, and other basic level courses. Basic courses in biology, anatomy and physiology are required. Depending on the nursing school, credits can be taken elsewhere, and transferred in, although limitations on time span between taking pre-requisites and applying to nursing programs often exist, usually around 5 years, although some schools set no parameters.

Core coursework includes anatomy, physiology, pathology, and pharmacology. Additionally, a strong emphasis is placed on procedural education such as insertion of intravenous and urinary catheters, sterile dressing changes, proper administration of medications, physical examinations, caring bedside manner, and other vital skills. After the first semester basic skills are obtained, students rotate through obstetrics, mental health, medical, surgical, oncology, critical care and pediatric units to get a holistic view of nursing and what it encompasses. Many nursing students and nursing schools use medical and healthcare educational software as a study or training aid.

Many schools offer an accelerated bachelor's degree in nursing program. A variation of the Second Degree BSN is the Accelerated BSN. In addition to giving credit for having completed liberal arts requirements, an Accelerated BSN program allows students to complete their undergraduate nursing program's course requirements more quickly than students enrolled in a traditional BSN program. Accelerated BSN programs usually take 12 months to complete, though some programs may run for 16 to 24 months.

The traditional BSN programs may take much longer time. For example, in California, where nursing is a relatively high-paid and in high demand profession, the completion of BSN (including pre-requisites, major courses in the program, and General Education courses of college) may take 5 to 6 years. A 3.0 GPA is often an entrance requirement for many programs. Some more prestigious schools require much higher GPA score to be competitive. Many programs now also require TEAS-V test scores to evaluate potential students for entry. Also, there are other options of Associate Degree for RN and LPN programs (which in term of nursing training is much shorter and the scope of practice is different than RN). Lastly, the Master level is for experienced RNs to reach a higher education and may expand their scope of practice.

Nursing students today have a wide variety of program options that range from state colleges or universities to private, for-profit entities. Nursing programs that are accredited offer program content that meets the national and state level standards. The U.S. Department of Education identifies that the act of accreditation may support programs of study that continually assess their quality of education, strive to offer improvements when needed, utilize faculty and staff when planning and implementing program evaluation, and standardizing criteria specific to professional certificates and licensure. Ensuring that curriculum is up-to-date, relevant, and current to the happenings within nursing and healthcare today, may be better obtained through an accredited nursing program. Nursing students that choose an accredited nursing program could receive federal financial aid and might successfully transfer course credits to another accredited program. These benefits may not be available for students that utilize a non-accredited program. There are two main accrediting bodies for nursing programs. The Accreditation Commission for Education in Nursing (ACEN) and the Commission on Collegiate Nursing Education (CCNE). Both accrediting bodies are sufficient to ensure that nursing programs meet national standards. ACEN provides accreditations for all levels of nursing programs; this includes the practical nurse through the doctorate. CCNE provides accreditation for the bachelorette and master's nursing programs.

In the United States, students graduate from nursing education programs qualified to take one of the NCLEX (National Council Licensure Examination) exams, the NCLEX-PN for Licensed Practical Nurses (LPNs) or the NCLEX-RN for Registered Nurses (RNs).

== Continuing education ==
Continuing education in nursing is required in many jurisdictions. Registered nurses are required to participate in continuing education to retain their licensing and registration. Programs for continuing nursing education (CNE) vary by jurisdiction. In 2010, it was projected that by 2018, there would be a 22% job growth in the nursing field; at the time it was the United States' fastest growing occupation. The need to re-educate faculties is necessary because faculty must be skilled in various new teaching approaches, evidence-based nursing and nursing informatics as well as on how to obtain and impart knowledge and processes for influencing change processes.

== Academic integrity and nursing education ==
Within the undergraduate student population, over 70% have self-reported participating in some form of academic misconduct or dishonesty within the classroom setting. Academic integrity within nursing education programs should be prioritized as research states that dishonest behaviors in the classroom setting may increase the likelihood of clinical dishonesty. This could impact patient safety and outcomes. Nursing programs could begin to address academic misconduct in the classroom by leaning into Bandura's Social Learning Theory (SLT). The SLT posits that students learn behaviors from observing, imitating, and modeling. A variety of educational tools may be implemented to help shape the student's perceptions of dishonest behaviors. Some curriculum, simulation, and experiential learning experiences may help model appropriate classroom and clinical behavior choices. With the explosion of artificial intelligence (AI) use among students, educating the nursing student population on how to appropriately utilize AI resources may be necessary. The potential benefits of AI in the health care arena promise to revolutionize the approach to some of the most vexing care and systems problems. These include improved diagnosis and treatment; enhanced health research and drug development; and additional aid with the public health interventions, such as disease surveillance, outbreak response, and health systems management. However, others are concerned about the rapid pace of AI innovation and the lack of knowledge related to the potential risks and unintended consequences associated with these nascent technologies. With the wide availability of chat-based AI tools, nurse educators are increasingly worried that nursing students will rely too heavily on AI tools, neglecting critical thinking, relationship building, and communication skills. Plagiarism is also a major area of concern. While AI tools like ChatGPT can enhance learning and engagement, their ability to rapidly generate text may facilitate student plagiarism, undermining academic integrity.

== See also ==
- Academic dress
- Associate of Science in Nursing
- Bachelor of Science in Nursing
- Diploma in Nursing
- Doctor of Nursing Practice
- HESI exam
- Master of Science in Nursing
- Nurse educator
- Nursing school
- List of nursing credentials
- Timeline of nursing history
- Nursing schools:
  - Nursing schools by country (category)
  - List of nursing colleges in India
  - List of nursing schools in Malaysia
  - List of nursing schools in the United States
  - List of nursing schools in Europe
  - List of Nursing Training Colleges in Ghana
