= List of Sigma Theta Tau chapters =

Sigma Theta Tau is an international honor society for nursing. It was established in at Indiana University in Indianapolis, Indiana on October 4, 1922. In the following list of Sigma Theta Tau chapters, active chapters are indicated in bold and inactive chapters and institutions are in italics.

No.	Chapter	Charter date and range	Institution	Location	Status	Ref.
1	**Alpha**	October 5, 1922	Indiana University School of Nursing	Indianapolis, Indiana	Active	
	Beta	1927	Washington University in St. Louis	St. Louis, Missouri	Inactive	
2	**Gamma**	May 1, 1929	University of Iowa College of Nursing	Iowa City, Iowa	Active	
3	**Delta**	January 13, 1931 – 19xx ?; xxxx ?	University of Kansas School of Nursing	Lawrence, Kansas	Active	
4	**Epsilon**	February 23, 1932	Ohio State University College of Nursing	Columbus, Ohio	Active	
5	**Zeta**	March 12, 1934	University of Minnesota School of Nursing	Minneapolis, Minnesota	Active	
6	**Eta**	June 3, 1946	University of Pittsburgh School of Nursing	Pittsburgh, Pennsylvania	Active	
7	**Theta**	May 26, 1953	Boston University	Boston, Massachusetts	Active	(Note: Chapter formed at Boston University and later expanded to include other locations.) (Note: This is an At-Large Chapter, a collaborative group of students from two or more schools or locations that come together to form a single, unified chapter.)
7	**Theta**	May 26, 1953	Curry College	Milton, Massachusetts	Active	(Note: Chapter formed at Boston University and later expanded to include other locations.) (Note: This is an At-Large Chapter, a collaborative group of students from two or more schools or locations that come together to form a single, unified chapter.)
8	**Iota**	June 3, 1953	Vanderbilt University	Nashville, Tennessee	Active	(Note: Chapter formed at Vanderbilt University and later expanded to include other locations.)
8	**Iota**	June 3, 1953	Middle Tennessee School of Anesthesia	Nashville, Tennessee	Active	(Note: Chapter formed at Vanderbilt University and later expanded to include other locations.)
9	**Kappa**	June 8, 1953	Conway School of Nursing	Washington, D.C.	Active	
10	**Lambda**	June 12, 1953	Wayne State University	Detroit, Michigan	Active	
11	**Mu**	March 19, 1955	University of Connecticut School of Nursing	Storrs, Connecticut	Active	
12	**Nu**	June 21, 1958	University of Alabama at Birmingham	Birmingham, Alabama	Active	(Note: Chapter formed at the University of Alabama and later expanded to include other locations.)
12	**Nu**	June 21, 1958	UAB Hospital	Birmingham, Alabama	Active	(Note: Chapter formed at the University of Alabama and later expanded to include other locations.)
12	**Nu**	June 21, 1958	Tuskegee University	Tuskegee, Alabama	Active	(Note: Chapter formed at the University of Alabama and later expanded to include other locations.)
13	**Xi**	August 6, 1958	University of Pennsylvania	Philadelphia, Pennsylvania	Active	
14	**Omicron**	February 21, 1959	Syracuse University College of Human Ecology - Nursing	Syracuse, New York	Active	(Note: Chapter formed at Syracuse University and later expanded to include other locations.)
14	**Omicron**	February 21, 1959	Le Moyne College Department of Nursing	Syracuse, New York	Active	(Note: Chapter formed at Syracuse University and later expanded to include other locations.)
14	**Omicron**	February 21, 1959	State University of New York Upstate Medical University College of Nursing	Syracuse, New York	Active	(Note: Chapter formed at Syracuse University and later expanded to include other locations.)
15	**Pi**	June 2, 1959	University of Maryland School of Nursing	Baltimore, Maryland	Active	(Note: Chapter formed at the University of Maryland and later expanded to include other locations.)
15	**Pi**	June 2, 1959	Anne Arundel Medical Center	Annapolis, Maryland	Active	(Note: Chapter formed at the University of Maryland and later expanded to include other locations.)
16	**Rho**	June 8, 1959	University of Michigan School of Nursing	Ann Arbor, Michigan	Active	
	Sigma	1960	St. Joseph		Inactive	
17	**Tau**	June 9, 1960	Georgetown University Department of Nursing	Washington, D.C.	Active	
18	**Upsilon**	June 24, 1961	New York University Rory Meyers College of Nursing	New York City, New York	Active	
19	**Phi**	January 1, 1961	South Dakota State University College of Nursing	Brookings, South Dakota	Active	
20	**Chi**	May 25, 1962	St. Catherine University Henrietta Schmoll School of Health	Saint Paul, Minnesota	Active	(Note: Chapter formed at St. Catherine University and later expanded to include other locations.)
20	**Chi**	May 25, 1962	Bethel University	Saint Paul, Minnesota	Active	(Note: Chapter formed at St. Catherine University and later expanded to include other locations.)
20	**Chi**	May 25, 1962	Gustavus Adolphus College Department of Nursing	St. Peter, Minnesota	Active	(Note: Chapter formed at St. Catherine University and later expanded to include other locations.)
20	**Chi**	May 25, 1962	St. Olaf College Department of Nursing	Northfield, Minnesota	Active	(Note: Chapter formed at St. Catherine University and later expanded to include other locations.)
21	**Psi**	June 1, 1962	University of Washington	Seattle, Washington	Active	(Note: Chapter formed at the University of Washington and later expanded to include other locations.)
21	**Psi**	June 1, 1962	Northwest University	Kirkland, Washington	Active	(Note: Chapter formed at the University of Washington and later expanded to include other locations.)
21	**Psi**	June 1, 1962	Olympic College	Bremerton, Washington	Active	(Note: Chapter formed at the University of Washington and later expanded to include other locations.)
21	**Psi**	June 1, 1962	Pacific Lutheran University School of Nursing	Tacoma, Washington	Active	(Note: Chapter formed at the University of Washington and later expanded to include other locations.)
21	**Psi**	June 1, 1962	Seattle Pacific University	Seattle, Washington	Active	(Note: Chapter formed at the University of Washington and later expanded to include other locations.)
21	**Psi**	June 1, 1962	University of Washington Bothell	Bothell, Washington	Active	(Note: Chapter formed at the University of Washington and later expanded to include other locations.)
21	**Psi**	June 1, 1962	University of Washington Tacoma	Tacoma, Washington	Active	(Note: Chapter formed at the University of Washington and later expanded to include other locations.)
22	**Omega**	June 2, 1962	Leighton School of Nursing	Indianapolis, Indiana	Active	(Note: Chapter formed at De Pauw University and later expanded to include Marian University's Leighton School of Nursing.)
23	**Alpha Alpha**	October 5, 1962	University of North Carolina at Chapel Hill School of Nursing	Chapel Hill, North Carolina	Active	
24	**Alpha Beta**	March 17, 1963	Loyola University Chicago Marcella Niehoff School of Nursing	Chicago, Illinois	Active	
25	**Alpha Gamma**	May 6, 1963	San Jose State University School of Nursing	San Jose, California	Active	
26	**Alpha Delta**	May 25, 1963	University of Texas Medical Branch School of Nursing	Galveston, Texas	Active	
27	**Alpha Epsilon**	January 1, 1964	Nell Hodgson Woodruff School of Nursing	Atlanta, Georgia	Active	
28	**Alpha Zeta**	May 18, 1964	Columbia University School of Nursing	New York City, New York	Active	
28	**Alpha Zeta**	May 18, 1964	Teachers College, Columbia University	New York City, New York	Active	
29	**Alpha Eta**	May 22, 1964	University of California, San Francisco School of Nursing	San Francisco, California	Active	
30	**Alpha Theta**	January 1, 1964	University of Florida College of Nursing	Gainesville, Florida	Active	
31	**Alpha Iota**	December 1, 1964	Sinclair School of Nursing	Columbia, Missouri	Active	
32	**Alpha Kappa**	January 15, 1966	Colorado Christian University	Northglenn, Colorado	Active	
32	**Alpha Kappa**	January 15, 1966	Metropolitan State University of Denver Department of Nursing	Denver, Colorado	Active	
32	**Alpha Kappa**	January 15, 1966	Regis University Loretta Heights School of Nursing	Denver, Colorado	Active	
32	**Alpha Kappa**	January 15, 1966	University of Colorado Anschutz Medical Campus	Denver, Colorado	Active	
33	**Alpha Lambda**	February 19, 1966	University of Illinois Chicago College of Nursing	Chicago, Illinois	Active	
34	**Alpha Mu**	March 12, 1966	Case Western Reserve University	Cleveland, Ohio	Active	
35	**Alpha Nu**	May 15, 1966	Villanova University Fitzpatrick College of Nursing	Villanova, Pennsylvania	Active	
36	**Alpha Xi**	November 19, 2020	Sam Houston State University	Huntsville, Texas	Active	
37	**Alpha Omicron**	May 21, 1966	Saint Xavier University School of Nursing	Chicago, Illinois	Active	
38	**Alpha Pi**	May 22, 1966	University of Wyoming Fay W. Whitney School of Nursing	Laramie, Wyoming	Active	
39	**Alpha Rho**	May 27, 1966	West Virginia University School of Nursing	Morgantown, West Virginia	Active	
40	**Alpha Sigma**	January 1, 1966	Seattle University College of Nursing	Seattle, Washington	Active	
41	**Alpha Tau**	March 2, 1968	Rutgers School of Nursing	Newark, New Jersey	Active	
42	Alpha Upsilon	1968 – 1977	Cornell School of Nursing	Ithaca, New York	Inactive	(Note: Chapter formed at the Cornell University-New York Hospital School of Nursing, later called Cornell School of Nursing. The school closed in 1977.)
43	**Alpha Phi**	February 22, 1970	Hunter-Bellevue School of Nursing	New York City, New York	Active	
44	**Alpha Chi**	January 1, 1970	Boston College William F. Connell School of Nursing	Chestnut Hill, Massachusetts	Active	
45	**Alpha Psi**	April 10, 1970	Michigan State University College of Nursing Professional Partnership	East Lansing, Michigan	Active	
46	**Alpha Omega**	April 12, 1970	Adelphi University College of Nursing and Public Health	Garden City, New York	Active	
47	**Beta Alpha**	April 12, 1970	Texas Christian University Harris College of Nursing	Fort Worth, Texas	Active	
48	**Beta Beta (Dallas)**	May 2, 1970	Texas Woman's University College of Nursing - Dallas	Dallas, Texas	Active	
48	**Beta Beta (Houston)**	May 2, 1970	Texas Woman's University Institute of Health Sciences - Houston Center	Houston, Texas	Active	
49	**Beta Gamma**	May 2, 1970	University of San Francisco School of Nursing and Health Professions	San Francisco, California	Active	
50	**Beta Delta**	May 15, 1970	Northwestern Oklahoma State University	Alva, Oklahoma	Active	
50	**Beta Delta**	May 15, 1970	Oklahoma Baptist University School of Nursing	Shawnee, Oklahoma	Active	
50	**Beta Delta**	May 15, 1970	Oklahoma City University Kramer School of Nursing	Oklahoma City, Oklahoma	Active	
50	**Beta Delta**	May 15, 1970	Southern Nazarene University	Bethany, Oklahoma	Active	
50	**Beta Delta**	May 15, 1970	Southwestern Oklahoma State University	Weatherford, Oklahoma	Active	
50	**Beta Delta**	May 15, 1970	University of Oklahoma College of Medicine School of Nursing	Oklahoma City, Oklahoma	Active	
50	**Beta Delta**	May 15, 1970	University of Central Oklahoma Department of Nursing	Edmond, Oklahoma	Active	
51	**Beta Epsilon**	April 7, 1972	Duke University School of Nursing	Durham, North Carolina	Active	
52	**Beta Zeta**	April 9, 1972	American International College	Springfield, Massachusetts	Active	
52	**Beta Zeta**	April 9, 1972	Bay Path University	Longmeadow, Massachusetts	Active	
52	**Beta Zeta**	April 9, 1972	Elms College Department of Nursing	Chicopee, Massachusetts	Active	
52	**Beta Zeta**	April 9, 1972	University of Massachusetts Amherst College of Nursing	Amherst, Massachusetts	Active	
52	**Beta Zeta**	April 9, 1972	Westfield State University	Westfield, Massachusetts	Active	
53	**Beta Eta**	April 9, 1972	Edgewood University	Madison, Wisconsin	Active	
53	**Beta Eta**	April 9, 1972	University of Wisconsin–Madison	Madison, Wisconsin	Active	
54	**Beta Theta**	May 20, 1972	Baptist Health Sciences University	Memphis, Tennessee	Active	
54	**Beta Theta**	May 20, 1972	Christian Brothers University	Memphis, Tennessee	Active	
54	**Beta Theta**	May 20, 1972	University of Memphis School of Nursing	Memphis, Tennessee	Active	
54	**Beta Theta**	May 20, 1972	University of Tennessee Health Science Center College of Nursing	Memphis, Tennessee	Active	
55	**Beta Iota**	May 21, 1972	University of Cincinnati College of Nursing	Cincinnati, Ohio	Active	
56	**Beta Kappa**	November 11, 1972	University of Virginia School of Nursing	Charlottesville, Virginia	Active	
57	Beta Lambda		Avila College Department of Nursing	Kansas City, Missouri	Inactive	
58	**Beta Mu**	April 5, 1974	University of Arizona College of Nursing	Tucson, Arizona	Active	
59	**Beta Nu**	April 6, 1974	East Carolina University College of Nursing	Greenville, North Carolina	Active	
60	**Beta Xi**	April 19, 1974	Delaware Technical Community College	Dover, Delaware	Active	
60	**Beta Xi**	April 19, 1974	University of Delaware School of Nursing	Newark, Delaware	Active	
61	**Beta Omicron**	April 20, 1974	Augusta University College of Nursing	Augusta, Georgia	Active	
62	**Beta Pi**	April 20, 1974	Florida State University School of Nursing	Tallahassee, Florida	Active	
63	**Beta Rho**	April 20, 1974	Ball State University School of Nursing	Muncie, Indiana	Active	
64	**Beta Sigma**	May 4, 1974	Pennsylvania State University College of Nursing	University Park, Pennsylvania	Active	
65	**Beta Tau**	October 19, 1974	University of Miami School of Nursing and Health Studies	Coral Gables, Florida	Active	
66	**Beta Upsilon**	March 10, 1976	Arizona State University College of Nursing and Health Innovation	Tempe, Arizona	Active	
67	**Beta Phi**	March 19, 1976	Athens State University	Athens, Alabama	Active	
67	**Beta Phi**	March 19, 1976	University of Alabama in Huntsville School of Nursing	Huntsville, Alabama	Active	
68	**Beta Chi**	April 2, 1976	Northwestern State University College of Nursing	Shreveport, Louisiana	Active	
69	**Beta Psi**	April 10, 1976	Oregon Health and Science University Ashland Campus	Ashland, Oregon	Active	
69	**Beta Psi**	April 10, 1976	Oregon Health and Science University Klamath Falls Campus, School of Nursing	Klamath Falls, Oregon	Active	
69	**Beta Psi**	April 10, 1976	Oregon Health and Science University La Grande Campus, School of Nursing	La Grande, Oregon	Active	
69	**Beta Psi**	April 10, 1976	Oregon Health and Sciences University Portland Campus	Portland, Oregon	Active	
69	**Beta Psi**	April 10, 1976	Oregon Health and Sciences University Virtual Campus	Portland, Oregon	Active	
69	**Beta Psi**	April 10, 1976	Oregon Health and Science University, Monmouth Campus	Monmouth, Oregon	Active	
70	**Beta Omega**	April 10, 1976	Northern Illinois University School of Nursing	DeKalb, Illinois	Active	
71	**Gamma Alpha**	April 11, 1976	Loma Linda University School of Nursing	Loma Linda, California	Active	
72	**Gamma Beta**	April 24, 1976	Howard University	Washington, D.C.	Active	
73	**Gamma Gamma**	April 30, 1976	San Diego State University	San Diego, California	Active	
74	**Gamma Delta**	May 1, 1976	State University of New York at Plattsburgh Nursing Program	Plattsburgh, New York	Active	
75	**Gamma Epsilon**	June 6, 1976	Northeastern University Bouvé College of Health Sciences School of Nursing	Boston, Massachusetts	Active	
76	**Gamma Zeta**	October 5, 1976	University of North Carolina at Greensboro School of Nursing	Greensboro, North Carolina	Active	
77	**Gamma Eta**	February 18, 1978	Samford University Ida V. Moffett School of Nursing	Birmingham, Alabama	Active	
78	**Gamma Theta**	March 4, 1978	Niagara University College of Nursing	Niagara University, New York	Active	
79	**Gamma Iota**	March 10, 1978	University of North Carolina at Charlotte College of Health and Human Services, School of Nursing	Charlotte, North Carolina	Active	
80	**Gamma Kappa**	March 17, 1978	University at Buffalo	Buffalo, New York	Active	
81	**Gamma Lambda**	March 18, 1978	University of Southern Mississippi School of Nursing	Hattiesburg, Mississippi	Active	
82	**Gamma Mu**	April 3, 1978	Clemson University College of Health, Education and Human Development, School of Nursing	Clemson, South Carolina	Active	
83	**Gamma Nu**	April 7, 1978	Seton Hall University	South Orange, New Jersey	Active	
84	**Gamma Xi**	April 14, 1978	Henderson State University	Arkadelphia, Arkansas	Active	
84	**Gamma Xi**	April 14, 1978	Ouachita Baptist University	Arkadelphia, Arkansas	Active	
84	**Gamma Xi**	April 14, 1978	Southern Arkansas University	Magnolia, Arkansas	Active	
84	**Gamma Xi**	April 14, 1978	University of Arkansas at Little Rock	Little Rock, Arkansas	Active	
84	**Gamma Xi**	April 14, 1978	University of Arkansas for Medical Sciences College of Nursing	Little Rock, Arkansas	Active	
84	**Gamma Xi**	April 14, 1978	University of Arkansas at Monticello	Monticello, Arkansas	Active	
85	**Gamma Omicron**	April 14, 1978	Charleston Southern University School of Nursing	Charleston, South Carolina	Active	
85	**Gamma Omicron**	April 14, 1978	Medical University of South Carolina	Charleston, South Carolina	Active	
85	**Gamma Omicron**	April 14, 1978	The Citadel	Charleston, South Carolina	Active	
86	**Gamma Pi**	April 16, 1978	College of Saint Mary	Omaha, Nebraska	Active	
86	**Gamma Pi**	April 16, 1978	University of Nebraska Medical Center College of Nursing	Omaha, Nebraska	Active	
86	**Gamma Pi**	April 16, 1978	University of Nebraska Medical Center Scottsbluff, Gering College of Nursing	Scottsbluff, Nebraska	Active	
86	**Gamma Pi**	April 16, 1978	University of Nebraska Medical Center Kearney, College of Nursing	Kearney, Nebraska	Active	
86	**Gamma Pi**	April 16, 1978	University of Nebraska Medical Center, Lincoln, College of Nursing	Lincoln, Nebraska	Active	
86	**Gamma Pi**	April 16, 1978	University of Nebraska Medical Center Norfolk, McIntosh College of Nursing	Norfolk, Nebraska	Active	
87	**Gamma Rho**	April 26, 1978	University of Utah	Salt Lake City, Utah	Active	
88	**Gamma Sigma**	April 30, 1978	University of New Mexico, College of Nursing	Albuquerque, New Mexico	Active	
89	**Gamma Tau**	May 13, 1978	California State University, Channel Islands	Camarillo, California	Active	
89	**Gamma Tau**	May 13, 1978	California State University, Northridge	Northridge, California	Active	
89	**Gamma Tau**	May 13, 1978	UCLA School of Nursing	Los Angeles, California	Active	
89	**Gamma Tau**	May 13, 1978	UCLA Health System	Los Angeles, California	Active	
90	**Gamma Upsilon**	May 14, 1978	Pittsburg State University Department of Nursing	Pittsburg, Kansas	Active	
91	**Gamma Phi**	May 19, 1978	Rush University	Chicago, Illinois	Active	
92	**Gamma Chi**	May 20, 1978	University of Tennessee College of Nursing	Knoxville, Tennessee	Active	
93	**Gamma Psi**	June 11, 1978	Chaminade University of Honolulu	Honolulu, Hawaii	Active	
93	**Gamma Psi**	June 11, 1978	Hawaii Pacific University	Honolulu, Hawaii	Active	
93	**Gamma Psi**	June 11, 1978	University of Hawaiʻi at Mānoa	Honolulu, Hawaii	Active	
93	**Gamma Psi**	June 11, 1978	University of Hawaiʻi at Hilo	Hilo, Hawaii	Active	
94	**Gamma Omega**	October 19, 1978	Bon Secours Memorial College of Nursing	Richmond, Virginia	Active	
94	**Gamma Omega**	October 19, 1978	Virginia Commonwealth University	Richmond, Virginia	Active	
95	**Delta Alpha**	December 15, 1979	Texas Lutheran University	Seguin, Texas	Active	
95	**Delta Alpha**	December 15, 1979	University of Texas Health Science Center at San Antonio School of Nursing	San Antonio, Texas	Active	
95	**Delta Alpha**	December 15, 1979	University of the Incarnate Word	San Antonio, Texas	Active	
95	**Delta Alpha**	December 15, 1979	Wayland Baptist University	San Antonio, Texas	Active	
96	**Delta Beta**	January 27, 1980	University of South Florida College of Nursing	Tampa, Florida	Active	
96	**Delta Beta**	January 27, 1980	University of Tampa	Tampa, Florida	Active	
97	**Delta Gamma**	February 10, 1980	Alverno College	Milwaukee, Wisconsin	Active	
97	**Delta Gamma**	February 10, 1980	Marquette University College of Nursing	Milwaukee, Wisconsin	Active	
98	**Delta Delta**	March 1, 1980	West Texas A&M University Department of Nursing	Canyon, Texas	Active	
99	**Delta Epsilon**	March 1, 1980	Murray State University School of Nursing	Murray, Kentucky	Active	
100	Delta Zeta	March 8, 1980	Lehman College Department of Nursing	Bronx, New York	Active	
101	**Delta Eta**	March 13, 1980	University of Louisiana at Lafayette College of Nursing and Allied Health Professions	Lafayette, Louisiana	Active	
102	**Delta Theta**	March 23, 1980	University of Texas at Arlington	Arlington, Texas	Active	
103	**Delta Iota**	March 27, 1980	Hampton University School of Nursing	Hampton, Virginia	Active	
104	**Delta Kappa**	March 28, 1980	University of Texas at El Paso, Health Science and College of Nursing	El Paso, Texas	Active	
105	**Delta Lambda**	March 29, 1980	Saint Louis University School of Nursing	St. Louis, Missouri	Active	
105	**Delta Lambda**	March 29, 1980	Webster University	Webster Groves, Missouri	Active	
106	**Delta Mu**	March 30, 1980	Yale School of Nursing	West Haven, Connecticut	Active	
107	**Delta Nu**	April 11, 1980	The College of New Jersey School of Nursing	Ewing Township, New Jersey	Active	
108	**Delta Xi**	April 11, 1980	Kent State University	Kent, Ohio	Active	
109	**Delta Omicron**	April 13, 1980	Purdue University	West Lafayette, Indiana	Active	
110	**Delta Pi**	April 13, 1980	Russell Sage College	Troy, New York	Active	
111	**Delta Rho**	April 18, 1980	Thomas Jefferson University School of Nursing	Philadelphia, Pennsylvania	Active	
111	**Delta Rho**	April 18, 1980	Jefferson Health	Philadelphia, Pennsylvania	Active	
112	**Delta Sigma**	April 18, 1980	St. John Fisher University Wegmans School of Nursing	Rochester, New York	Active	
113	**Delta Tau**	April 19, 1980	Eastern University	St. Davids, Pennsylvania	Active	
113	**Delta Tau**	April 19, 1980	Holy Family University Newtown Campus	Newtown, Pennsylvania	Active	
113	**Delta Tau**	April 19, 1980	Immaculata University	Immaculata, Pennsylvania	Active	
113	**Delta Tau**	April 19, 1980	Neumann University School of Nursing	Aston Township, Pennsylvania	Active	
114	**Delta Upsilon**	April 20, 1980	Rhode Island College School of Nursing	Providence, Rhode Island	Active	
114	**Delta Upsilon**	April 20, 1980	Salve Regina University Department of Nursing	Newport, Rhode Island	Active	
114	**Delta Upsilon**	April 20, 1980	University of Rhode Island	Kingston, Rhode Island	Active	
115	**Delta Phi**	April 26, 1980	University of Wisconsin–Eau Claire College of Nursing and Health Sciences	Eau Claire, Wisconsin	Active	
116	**Delta Chi**	April 25, 1980	Gonzaga University, School of Nursing and Human Physiology	Spokane, Washington	Active	
116	**Delta Chi**	April 25, 1980	Washington State University College of Nursing	Spokane, Washington	Active	
117	**Delta Psi**	April 26, 1980	Berea College	Berea, Kentucky	Active	
117	**Delta Psi**	April 26, 1980	Campbellsville University	Campbellsville, Kentucky	Active	
117	**Delta Psi**	April 26, 1980	University of Kentucky	Lexington, Kentucky	Active	
118	**Delta Omega**	April 26, 1980	University of Akron College of Nursing	Akron, Ohio	Active	
119	**Epsilon Alpha**	April 26, 1980	Byrdine F. Lewis College of Nursing and Health Professions	Atlanta, Georgia	Active	
120	Epsilon Beta	April 27, 1980	Fitchburg State College	Fitchburg, Massachusetts	Inactive	
121	**Epsilon Gamma**	April 27, 1980	Newman University Nursing Division	Wichita, Kansas	Active	
121	**Epsilon Gamma**	April 27, 1980	Southwestern College Professional Studies	Wichita, Kansas	Active	
121	**Epsilon Gamma**	April 27, 1980	Wichita State University School of Nursing	Wichita, Kansas	Active	
122	**Epsilon Delta**	May 4, 1980	Davis & Elkins College	Elkins, West Virginia	Active	
122	**Epsilon Delta**	May 4, 1980	Fairmont State University School of Nursing and Allied Health Administration	Fairmont, West Virginia	Active	
122	**Epsilon Delta**	May 4, 1980	West Virginia Wesleyan College	Buckhannon, West Virginia	Active	
123	**Epsilon Epsilon**	May 4, 1980	Bradley University	Peoria, Illinois	Active	
124	**Epsilon Zeta**	May 4, 1980	George Mason University College of Health and Human Services	Fairfax, Virginia	Active	
125	**Epsilon Eta**	May 4, 1980	Southern Illinois University Carbondale	Carbondale, Illinois	Active	
125	**Epsilon Eta**	May 4, 1980	Southern Illinois University Edwardsville	Edwardsville, Illinois	Active	
126	**Epsilon Theta**	May 16, 1980	University of Texas at Austin	Austin, Texas	Active	
127	Epsilon Iota	1980 ?	University of New Hampshire Department of Nursing	Durham, New Hampshire	Inactive	
128	**Epsilon Kappa**	May 18, 1980	Molloy University	Rockville Centre, New York	Active	
129	**Epsilon Lambda**	May 22, 1980	University of Puerto Rico at Mayagüez	Mayagüez, Puerto Rico	Active	
130	**Epsilon Mu**	December 5, 1981	Wagner College Evelyn L. Spiro School of Nursing	Staten Island, New York	Active	
131	**Epsilon Nu**	January 30, 1982	Louisiana State University	New Orleans, Louisiana	Active	
131	**Epsilon Nu**	January 30, 1982	University Medical Center New Orleans	New Orleans, Louisiana	Active	
131	**Epsilon Nu**	January 30, 1982	Louisiana State University of Alexandria	Alexandria, Louisiana	Active	
132	**Epsilon Xi**	February 7, 1982	University of Rochester	Rochester, New York	Active	
133	**Epsilon Omicron**	February 9, 1982	Harding University College of Nursing	Searcy, Arkansas	Active	
134	**Epsilon Pi**	February 20, 1982	Valdosta State University College of Nursing	Valdosta, Georgia	Active	
135	**Epsilon Rho**	February 21, 1982	Fairleigh Dickinson University Henry P. Becton School of Nursing and Allied Health	Teaneck, New Jersey	Active	
136	**Epsilon Sigma**	March 7, 1982	East Tennessee State University	Johnson City, Tennessee	Active	
136	**Epsilon Sigma**	March 7, 1982	Emory and Henry University	Emory, Virginia	Active	
136	**Epsilon Sigma**	March 7, 1982	King University	Bristol, Tennessee	Active	
137	**Epsilon Tau**	March 21, 1982	Rivier University	Nashua, New Hampshire	Active	
137	**Epsilon Tau**	March 21, 1982	Saint Anselm College	Manchester, New Hampshire	Active	
138	**Epsilon Upsilon**	March 26, 1982	Lewis University College of Nursing and Health Professions	Romeoville, Illinois	Active	
139	**Epsilon Phi**	March 26, 1982	Duquesne University School of Nursing	Pittsburgh, Pennsylvania	Active	
140	**Epsilon Chi**	March 28, 1982	Old Dominion University School of Nursing	Norfolk, Virginia	Active	
141	**Epsilon Psi**	April 2, 1982	Radford University Waldron School of Nursing	Radford, Virginia	Active	
142	**Epsilon Omega**	April 4, 1982	University of Alabama Capstone College of Nursing	Tuscaloosa, Alabama	Active	
143	**Zeta Alpha**	April 4, 1982	University of Tennessee at Chattanooga	Chattanooga, Tennessee	Active	
144	**Zeta Beta**	April 4, 1982	Elmhurst University Center for Nursing Education	Elmhurst, Illinois	Active	
145	**Zeta Gamma**	April 16, 1982	University of South Alabama College of Nursing	Mobile, Alabama	Active	
146	**Zeta Delta**	April 16, 1982	Northeastern State University Department of Nursing	Muskogee, Oklahoma	Active	
146	**Zeta Delta**	April 16, 1982	University of Tulsa	Tulsa, Oklahoma	Active	
147	**Zeta Epsilon**	April 16, 1982	Valparaiso University College of Nursing	Valparaiso, Indiana	Active	
148	**Zeta Zeta**	April 19, 1982	Augustana University	Sioux Falls, South Dakota	Active	
149	**Zeta Eta**	April 20, 1982	California State University, Sacramento	Sacramento, California	Active	
149	**Zeta Eta**	April 20, 1982	Betty Irene Moore School of Nursing	Sacramento, California	Active	
150	**Zeta Theta**	April 22, 1982	Bowling Green State University College of Nursing	Bowling Green, Ohio	Active	
150	**Zeta Theta**	April 22, 1982	Lourdes University	Sylvania, Ohio	Active	
150	**Zeta Theta**	April 22, 1982	Mercy College of Ohio	Toledo, Ohio	Active	
150	**Zeta Theta**	April 22, 1982	University of Toledo	Toledo, Ohio	Active	
150	**Zeta Theta**	April 22, 1982	Ohio Northern University	Ada, Ohio	Active	
151	**Zeta Iota**	April 24, 1982	Binghamton University	Binghamton, New York	Active	
152	**Zeta Kappa**	April 24, 1982	Nevada State University	Henderson, Nevada	Active	
152	**Zeta Kappa**	April 24, 1982	University of Nevada, Las Vegas	Las Vegas, Nevada	Active	
153	**Zeta Lambda**	April 30, 1982	Indiana University of Pennsylvania	Indiana, Pennsylvania	Active	
154	**Zeta Mu**	May 7, 1982	Point Loma Nazarene University School of Nursing	San Diego, California	Active	
154	**Zeta Mu**	May 7, 1982	University of San Diego Hahn School of Nursing and Health Science	San Diego, California	Active	
155	**Zeta Nu**	May 8, 1982	D'Youville University	Buffalo, New York	Active	
156	**Zeta Xi**	May 8, 1982	Jacksonville State University	Jacksonville, Alabama	Active	
157	**Zeta Omicron**	May 14, 1982	University of Northern Colorado School of Nursing	Greeley, Colorado	Active	
158	**Zeta Pi**	May 14, 1982	Jane and Robert Cizik School of Nursing	Houston, Texas	Active	
159	**Zeta Rho**	May 14, 1982	Mississippi University for Women	Columbus, Mississippi	Active	
160	**Zeta Sigma**	May 16, 1982	DePaul University School of Nursing	Chicago, Illinois	Active	
161	Zeta Tau	May 22, 1982	Albright College	Reading, Pennsylvania	Inactive	
162	**Zeta Upsilon**	June 2, 1982	Carroll College	Helena, Montana	Active	
162	**Zeta Upsilon**	June 2, 1982	Montana Technological University	Butte, Montana	Active	
162	**Zeta Upsilon**	June 2, 1982	Montana State University	Bozeman, Montana	Active	
162	**Zeta Upsilon**	June 2, 1982	Montana State University Billings, College of Nursing	Billings, Montana	Active	
162	**Zeta Upsilon**	June 2, 1982	Montana State University, Great Falls, College of Nursing	Great Falls, Montana	Active	
162	**Zeta Upsilon**	June 2, 1982	University of Montana College of Nursing	Missoula, Montana	Active	
162	**Zeta Upsilon**	June 2, 1982	Montana State University Kalispell Campus	Kalispell, Montana	Active	
163	**Zeta Phi**	September 11, 1983	Kettering College	Kettering, Ohio	Active	
163	**Zeta Phi**	September 11, 1983	Wittenberg University	Springfield, Ohio	Active	
163	**Zeta Phi**	September 11, 1983	Wright State University	Dayton, Ohio	Active	
164	**Zeta Chi**	March 18, 1984	Grand View University Division of Nursing	Des Moines, Iowa	Active	
164	**Zeta Chi**	March 18, 1984	Mercy College of Health Sciences Division of Nursing	Des Moines, Iowa	Active	
165	**Zeta Psi**	March 24, 1984	Wilkes University	Wilkes-Barre, Pennsylvania	Active	
166	**Zeta Omega**	March 25, 1984	Dominican University New York	Orangeburg, New York	Active	
166	**Zeta Omega**	March 25, 1984	Mercy University	Dobbs Ferry, New York	Active	
167	**Eta Alpha**	March 25, 1984	Marymount University	Arlington County, Virginia	Active	
168	**Eta Beta**	March 31, 1984	Widener University	Chester, Pennsylvania	Active	
169	**Eta Gamma**	March 31, 1984	Baylor University	Waco, Texas	Active	
170	**Eta Delta**	March 31, 1984	Prairie View A&M University College of Nursing	Prairie View, Texas	Active	
171	**Eta Epsilon**	April 11, 1984	Carlow University	Pittsburgh, Pennsylvania	Active	
172	**Eta Zeta**	April 12, 1984	Andrews University	Berrien Springs, Michigan	Active	
173	**Eta Eta**	April 12, 1984	York College of Pennsylvania Stabler Department of Nursing	York, Pennsylvania	Active	
174	**Eta Theta**	April 15, 1984	Arkansas State University	State University, Arkansas	Active	
175	**Eta Iota**	April 15, 1984	Franklin Pierce University	Manchester, New Hampshire	Active	
175	**Eta Iota**	April 15, 1984	Southern New Hampshire University	Manchester, New Hampshire	Active	
175	**Eta Iota**	April 15, 1984	Keene State College	Keene, New Hampshire	Active	
175	**Eta Iota**	April 15, 1984	Plymouth State University	Plymouth, New Hampshire	Active	
175	**Eta Iota**	April 15, 1984	University of New Hampshire College of Health and Human Services	Durham, New Hampshire	Active	
175	**Eta Iota**	April 15, 1984	Exeter Hospital	Exeter, New Hampshire	Active	
175	**Eta Iota**	April 15, 1984	Wentworth-Douglass Hospital	Dover, New Hampshire	Active	
176	**Eta Kappa**	April 23, 1984	Baker University School of Nursing	Topeka, Kansas	Active	
176	**Eta Kappa**	April 23, 1984	Washburn University	Topeka, Kansas	Active	
176	**Eta Kappa**	April 23, 1984	Emporia State University Department of Nursing	Emporia, Kansas	Active	
177	**Eta Lambda**	April 25, 1984	University of Evansville	Evansville, Indiana	Active	
178	**Eta Mu**	April 5, 1974	University of Arizona College of Nursing	Tucson, Arizona	Active	
179	**Eta Nu**	April 6, 1974	East Carolina University College of Nursing	Greenville, North Carolina	Active	
180	**Eta Xi**	April 26, 1984	Gannon University	Erie, Pennsylvania	Active	
181	**Eta Omicron**	April 27, 1984	Texas A&M University–Corpus Christi College of Nursing & Health Sciences	Corpus Christi, Texas	Active	
182	**Eta Pi**	April 27, 1984	University of Wisconsin–Oshkosh College of Nursing	Oshkosh, Wisconsin	Active	
183	**Eta Rho**	April 20, 1974	Ball State University School of Nursing	Muncie, Indiana	Active	
184	**Eta Sigma**	April 27, 1984	University of Mount Saint Vincent	Bronx, New York	Active	
185	**Eta Tau**	April 29, 1984	Salem State University School of Nursing	Salem, Massachusetts	Active	
186	**Eta Upsilon**	May 3, 1984	University of North Dakota College of Nursing	Grand Forks, North Dakota	Active	
187	**Eta Phi**	May 4, 1984	Houston Christian University College of Nursing	Houston, Texas	Active	
188	**Eta Chi**	May 4, 1984	Indiana Wesleyan University	Marion, Indiana	Active	
189	**Eta Psi**	May 5, 1984	Western Carolina University	Cullowhee, North Carolina	Active	
189	**Eta Psi**	May 5, 1984	Western Carolina University in Asheville, School of Nursing	Asheville, North Carolina	Active	
190	**Eta Omega**	May 6, 1984	University of Massachusetts Lowell	Lowell, Massachusetts	Active	
191	**Theta Alpha**	May 18, 1984	University of Massachusetts Boston	Boston, Massachusetts	Active	
192	**Theta Beta**	January 20, 1986	University of Mississippi Medical Center, School of Nursing	Jackson, Mississippi	Active	
193	**Theta Gamma**	February 15, 1986	Briar Cliff University Department of Nursing	Sioux City, Iowa	Active	
193	**Theta Gamma**	February 15, 1986	Morningside University Department of Nursing	Sioux City, Iowa	Active	
194	**Theta Delta**	February 15, 1986	Auburn University School of Nursing	Auburn, Alabama	Active	
195	**Theta Epsilon**	February 22, 1986	University of Central Florida College of Nursing	Orlando, Florida	Active	
196	**Theta Zeta**	March 8, 1986	Commonwealth University of Pennsylvania Bloomsburg Campus	Bloomsburg, Pennsylvania	Active	
197	Theta Eta	March 14, 1986	City College of New York	New York City, New York	Inactive	
198	**Theta Theta**	March 16, 1986	Capital University	Columbus, Ohio	Active	
199	**Theta Iota**	April 5, 1986	Barton College School of Nursing	Wilson, North Carolina	Active	
200	**Theta Kappa**	April 5, 1986	University of Massachusetts Dartmouth College of Nursing	North Dartmouth, Massachusetts	Active	
201	**Theta Lambda**	April 6, 1986	College of the Ozarks	Point Lookout, Missouri	Active	
201	**Theta Lambda**	April 6, 1986	Missouri State University	Springfield, Missouri	Active	
202	**Theta Mu**	April 6, 1986	La Roche University	Pittsburgh, Pennsylvania	Active	
203	**Theta Nu**	April 10, 1986	Eastern Kentucky University	Richmond, Kentucky	Active	
204	**Theta Xi**	April 10, 1986	College of St. Scholastica School of Nursing	Duluth, Minnesota	Active	
205	**Theta Omicron**	May 13, 1986	University of Alaska Anchorage School of Nursing	Anchorage, Alaska	Active	
206	**Theta Pi**	April 12, 1986	Illinois Wesleyan University	Bloomington, Illinois	Active	
207	**Theta Rho**	April 13, 1986	Cedar Crest College	Allentown, Pennsylvania	Active	
208	**Theta Sigma**	April 16, 1986	Stockton University School of Health Sciences-Nursing	Pomona, New Jersey	Active	
209	**Theta Tau**	April 18, 1986	Georgia College & State University School of Nursing, College of Health Sciences	Milledgeville, Georgia	Active	
210	**Theta Upsilon**	April 18, 1986	Idaho State University School of Nursing	Pocatello, Idaho	Active	
210	**Theta Upsilon**	April 18, 1986	Idaho State University Meridian	Meridian, Idaho	Active	
211	**Theta Phi**	April 19, 1986	Misericordia University	Dallas, Pennsylvania	Active	
212	**Theta Chi**	April 24, 1986	Saginaw Valley State University	University Center, Michigan	Active	
213	**Theta Psi**	April 25, 1986	Oakland University	Rochester Hills, Michigan	Active	
213	**Theta Psi**	April 25, 1986	Rochester Christian University	Rochester Hills, Michigan	Active	
214	**Theta Omega**	April 26, 1986	Midland University Nursing Department	Fremont, Nebraska	Active	
215	**Iota Alpha**	May 3, 1986	Bloomfield College of Montclair State University	Bloomfield, New Jersey	Active	
215	**Iota Alpha**	May 3, 1986	William Paterson University	Wayne, New Jersey	Active	
216	**Iota Beta**	May 3, 1986	Tennessee Technological University School of Nursing	Cookeville, Tennessee	Active	
217	**Iota Gamma**	May 4, 1986	Spalding University School of Nursing	Louisville, Kentucky	Active	
218	**Iota Delta**	May 4, 1986	SUNY Polytechnic Institute School of Nursing	Utica, New York	Active	
218	**Iota Delta**	May 4, 1986	Utica College	Utica, New York	Active	
219	**Iota Epsilon**	May 4, 1986	Towson University Department of Nursing	Baltimore, Maryland	Active	
220	**Iota Zeta**	May 8, 1986	University of Louisville School of Nursing	Louisville, Kentucky	Active	
221	**Iota Eta**	January 1, 1986	California State University, Long Beach Department of Nursing	Long Beach, California	Active	
222	**Iota Theta**	May 18, 1986	Troy University School of Nursing	Troy, Alabama	Active	
223	**Iota Iota**	March 4, 1988	Brigham Young University	Provo, Utah	Active	
224	**Iota Kappa**	March 11, 1988	Gwynedd Mercy University School of Nursing	Gwynedd Valley, Pennsylvania	Active	
225	Iota Lambda	March 12, 1988	University of Southern California	Los Angeles, California	Inactive	
226	**Iota Mu**	March 12, 1988	Texas Tech University Health Sciences Center School of Nursing	Lubbock, Texas	Active	
227	**Iota Nu**	March 13, 1988	East Texas A&M University	Commerce, Texas	Active	
227	**Iota Nu**	March 13, 1988	East Texas Baptist University	Marshall, Texas	Active	
227	**Iota Nu**	March 13, 1988	University of Texas at Tyler	Tyler, Texas	Active	
228	**Iota Xi**	March 27, 1988	Broward College	Miramar, Florida	Active	
228	**Iota Xi**	March 27, 1988	Christine E. Lynn College of Nursing	Boca Raton, Florida	Active	
229	**Iota Omicron**	March 27, 1988	University of Western Ontario Arthur Labatt Family School of Nursing Faculty of Health Sciences	London, Ontario, Canada	Active	
230	**Iota Pi**	April 8, 1988	Colorado State University Pueblo School of Nursing	Pueblo, Colorado	Active	
231	Iota Rho	April 8, 1988	Coe College	Cedar Rapids, Iowa	Inactive	
232	**Iota Sigma**	April 9, 1988	Azusa Pacific University	Azusa, California	Active	
233	**Iota Tau**	April 9, 1988	Creighton University School of Nursing	Omaha, Nebraska	Active	
234	**Iota Upsilon**	April 10, 1988	Central Connecticut State University	New Britain, Connecticut	Active	
234	**Iota Upsilon**	April 10, 1988	Charter Oak State College	New Britain, Connecticut	Active	
234	**Iota Upsilon**	April 10, 1988	University of Hartford	West Hartford, Connecticut	Active	
234	**Iota Upsilon**	April 10, 1988	University of Saint Joseph	West Hartford, Connecticut	Active	
235	**Iota Phi**	April 10, 1988	Anna Maria College	Paxton, Massachusetts	Active	
235	**Iota Phi**	April 10, 1988	Assumption University	Worcester, Massachusetts	Active	
235	**Iota Phi**	April 10, 1988	Becker College	Worcester, Massachusetts	Active	
235	**Iota Phi**	April 10, 1988	University of Massachusetts, Worcester Graduate School of Nursing	Worcester, Massachusetts	Active	
235	**Iota Phi**	April 10, 1988	Worcester State University	Worcester, Massachusetts	Active	
235	**Iota Phi**	April 10, 1988	Atlantic Union College	South Lancaster, Massachusetts	Active	
236	Iota Chi		St. Mary of the Plains College	Dodge City, Kansas	Inactive	
237	**Iota Psi**	April 15, 1988	Ursuline College	Pepper Pike, Ohio	Active	
238	**Iota Omega**	April 16, 1988	University of Scranton	Scranton, Pennsylvania	Active	
239	**Kappa Alpha**	April 17, 1988	Western Connecticut State University	Danbury, Connecticut	Active	
240	Kappa Beta		University of Dubuque	Dubuque, Iowa	Active	
241	**Kappa Gamma**	April 17, 1988	Stony Brook University School of Nursing	Stony Brook, New York	Active	
242	**Kappa Delta**	April 22, 1988	La Salle University School of Nursing and Health Sciences	Philadelphia, Pennsylvania	Active	
243	**Kappa Epsilon**	April 22, 1988	Calvin University	Grand Rapids, Michigan	Active	
243	**Kappa Epsilon**	April 22, 1988	Ferris State University School of Nursing	Big Rapids, Michigan	Active	
243	**Kappa Epsilon**	April 22, 1988	Grand Valley State University	Allendale, Michigan	Active	
243	**Kappa Epsilon**	April 22, 1988	Hope College	Holland, Michigan	Active	
244	**Kappa Zeta**	April 23, 1988	Saint Joseph's College of Maine	Standish, Maine	Active	
244	**Kappa Zeta**	April 23, 1988	University of New England School of Nursing and Population Health	Portland, Maine	Active	
244	**Kappa Zeta**	April 23, 1988	University of Southern Maine College of Nursing and Health Professions-Nursing	Portland, Maine	Active	
244	**Kappa Zeta**	April 23, 1988	Maine Medical Center Portland - Bramhall Campus	Portland, Maine	Active	
244	**Kappa Zeta**	April 23, 1988	Maine Medical Center Portland - Brighton	Portland, Maine	Active	
244	**Kappa Zeta**	April 23, 1988	Maine Medical Center - Sanford	Sanford, Maine	Active	
244	**Kappa Zeta**	April 23, 1988	Maine Medical Center - Scarborough Campus	Scarborough, Maine	Active	
244	**Kappa Zeta**	April 23, 1988	Maine Medical Center, Biddeford	Biddeford, Maine	Active	
245	**Kappa Eta**	April 23, 1988	New Jersey City University	Jersey City, New Jersey	Active	
246	**Kappa Theta**	April 24, 1988	Western Kentucky University College of Health and Human Services - School of Nursing	Bowling Green, Kentucky	Active	
247	**Kappa Iota**	April 24, 1988	Madonna University College of Nursing	Livonia, Michigan	Active	
248	**Kappa Kappa**	April 24, 1988	Lamar University	Beaumont, Texas	Active	
249	**Kappa Lambda**	April 28, 1988	Otterbein University	Westerville, Ohio	Active	
250	**Kappa Mu**	April 29, 1988	Winona State University	Winona, Minnesota	Active	
251	**Kappa Nu**	April 29, 1988	North Park University School of Nursing	Chicago, Illinois	Active	
252	**Kappa Xi**	April 30, 1988	Mount Mercy University	Cedar Rapids, Iowa	Active	
253	**Kappa Omicron**	April 30, 1988	California State University, Chico School of Nursing	Chico, California	Active	
253	**Kappa Omicron**	April 30, 1988	Enloe Medical Center	Chico, California	Active	
254	**Kappa Pi**	May 6, 1988	Bellin College School of Nursing	Green Bay, Wisconsin	Active	
254	**Kappa Pi**	May 6, 1988	University of Wisconsin–Green Bay	Green Bay, Wisconsin	Active	
255	**Kappa Rho**	May 7, 1988	University of Central Arkansas	Conway, Arkansas	Active	
256	**Kappa Sigma**	May 7, 1988	Olivet Nazarene University	Bourbonnais, Illinois	Active	
257	**Kappa Tau**	May 7, 1988	University of Vermont	Burlington, Vermont	Active	
258	**Kappa Upsilon**	May 8, 1988	University of Mary	Bismarck, North Dakota	Active	
259	**Kappa Phi**	May 13, 1988	College of Saint Benedict and Saint John's University	St. Joseph, Minnesota	Active	
259	**Kappa Phi**	May 13, 1988	St. Cloud State University	St. Cloud, Minnesota	Active	
260	**Kappa Chi**	May 15, 1988	Temple University	Philadelphia, Pennsylvania	Active	
261	**Kappa Psi**	May 15, 1988	McNeese State University College of Nursing	Lake Charles, Louisiana	Active	
262	**Kappa Omega**	May 28, 1988	Auburn University at Montgomery School of Nursing	Montgomery, Alabama	Active	
263	**Lambda Alpha**	June 2, 1989	Chonnam National University College of Nursing	Gwangju, South Korea	Active	
263	**Lambda Alpha**	June 2, 1989	Chung-Ang University College of Medicine Department of Nursing	Seoul, South Korea	Active	
263	**Lambda Alpha**	June 2, 1989	Chungnam National University College of Nursing	Daejeon, South Korea	Active	
263	**Lambda Alpha**	June 2, 1989	Ewha Womans University College of Nursing Science	Seoul, South Korea	Active	
263	**Lambda Alpha**	June 2, 1989	Hanyang University Department of Nursing	Seoul, South Korea	Active	
263	**Lambda Alpha**	June 2, 1989	Korea University	Seoul, South Korea	Active	
263	**Lambda Alpha**	June 2, 1989	Keimyung University College of Nursing	Daegu, South Korea	Active	
263	**Lambda Alpha**	June 2, 1989	Kyung Hee University College of Nursing Science	Seoul, South Korea	Active	
263	**Lambda Alpha**	June 2, 1989	Kyungpook National University College of Nursing	Daegu, South Korea	Active	
263	**Lambda Alpha**	June 2, 1989	Pusan National University College of Nursing	Yangsan-si, Gyeonggi-do, South Korea	Active	
263	**Lambda Alpha**	June 2, 1989	Seoul National University	Seoul, South Korea	Active	
263	**Lambda Alpha**	June 2, 1989	Catholic University of Korea	Seoul, South Korea	Active	
263	**Lambda Alpha**	June 2, 1989	Yonsei University	Seoul, South Korea	Active	
264	**Lambda Beta**	June 14, 1989	National Defense Medical University	Neihu District, Taipei, Taiwan	Active	
264	**Lambda Beta**	June 14, 1989	National Yang Ming Chiao Tung University	Daan District, Taipei, Taiwan	Active	
265	**Lambda Gamma**	March 4, 1990	Sonoma State University	Rohnert Park, California	Active	
266	**Lambda Delta**	March 11, 1990	Monmouth University	Colts Neck Township, New Jersey	Active	
267	**Lambda Epsilon**	March 18, 1990	University of Indianapolis School of Nursing	Indianapolis, Indiana	Active	
268	**Lambda Zeta**	March 18, 1990	University of Detroit Mercy	Detroit, Michigan	Active	
269	**Lambda Eta**	March 18, 1990	Salisbury University School of Nursing	Salisbury, Maryland	Active	
270	**Lambda Theta**	March 24, 1990	Southeast Missouri State University	Cape Girardeau, Missouri	Active	
271	**Lambda Iota**	March 24, 1990	Kean University	Union Township, New Jersey	Active	
272	**Lambda Kappa**	March 30, 1990	Messiah University	Mechanicsburg, Pennsylvania	Active	
273	**Lambda Lambda**	March 31, 1990	Governors State University	University Park, Illinois	Active	
274	**Lambda Mu**	April 7, 1990	University of Louisiana at Monroe School of Nursing	Monroe, Louisiana	Active	
275	Lambda Nu	April 7, 1990	Lycoming College	Williamsport, Pennsylvania	Inactive	
276	Lambda Xi	April 7, 1990	College of Our Lady of the Elms	Chicopee, Massachusetts	Inactive	
277	**Lambda Omicron**	April 18, 1990	Northern Arizona University	Flagstaff, Arizona	Active	
278	**Lambda Pi**	April 18, 1990	Daphne Cockwell School of Nursing	Toronto, Ontario, Canada	Active	
278	**Lambda Pi**	April 18, 1990	Lawrence Bloomberg Faculty of Nursing	Toronto, Ontario, Canada	Active	
278	**Lambda Pi**	April 18, 1990	York University	Toronto, Ontario, Canada	Active	
279	**Lambda Rho**	April 20, 1990	Jacksonville University School of Nursing	Jacksonville, Florida	Active	
279	**Lambda Rho**	April 20, 1990	University of North Florida School of Nursing	Jacksonville, Florida	Active	
280	Lambda Sigma	April 20, 1990	Indiana State University	Terre Haute, Indiana	Inactive	
281	**Lambda Tau**	April 20, 1990	Slippery Rock University	Slippery Rock, Pennsylvania	Active	
282	**Lambda Upsilon**	April 20, 1990	Aurora University Andi Seifried School of Nursing	Aurora, Illinois	Active	
282	**Lambda Upsilon**	April 20, 1990	Benedictine University	Lisle, Illinois	Active	
283	**Lambda Phi**	April 22, 1990	University of Missouri–Kansas City School of Nursing	Kansas City, Missouri	Active	
284	**Lambda Chi**	April 22, 1990	Barry University	Miami Shores, Florida	Active	
285	**Lambda Psi**	April 22, 1990	Bellarmine University	Louisville, Kentucky	Active	
286	**Lambda Omega**	April 22, 1990	Ohio University School of Nursing	Athens, Ohio	Active	
287	**Mu Alpha**	April 22, 1990	Lenoir–Rhyne University College of Nursing	Hickory, North Carolina	Active	
288	**Mu Beta**	April 27, 1990	Southern Connecticut State University	New Haven, Connecticut	Active	
289	**Mu Gamma**	April 28, 1990	Boise State University	Boise, Idaho	Active	
289	**Mu Gamma**	April 28, 1990	Northwest Nazarene University	Nampa, Idaho	Active	
290	**Mu Delta**	April 29, 1990	Sacred Heart University College of Nursing	Trumbull, Connecticut	Active	
291	**Mu Epsilon**	April 29, 1990	Mount Saint Mary College	Newburgh, New York	Active	
292	**Mu Zeta**	April 29, 1990	Lander University William Preston Turner School of Nursing	Greenwood, South Carolina	Active	
293	**Mu Eta**	April 29, 1990	Notre Dame of Maryland University	Baltimore, Maryland	Active	
294	**Mu Theta**	April 29, 1990	Saint Elizabeth University	Morristown, New Jersey	Active	
294	**Mu Theta**	April 29, 1990	Saint Peter's University School of Nursing	Jersey City, New Jersey	Active	
295	**Mu Iota**	May 1, 1990	Oral Roberts University	Tulsa, Oklahoma	Active	
296	Mu Kappa	May 3, 1990	Georgia Southern University	Statesboro, Georgia	Inactive	
297	**Mu Lambda**	May 4, 1990	Minnesota State University, Mankato College of Allied Health & Nursing	Mankato, Minnesota	Active	
298	**Mu Mu**	May 4, 1990	William Jewell College	Liberty, Missouri	Active	
299	**Mu Nu**	May 5, 1990	California State University, Fresno	Fresno, California	Active	
300	**Mu Xi**	May 11, 1990	PennWest Clarion School of Nursing & Allied Health	Clarion, Pennsylvania	Active	
301	**Mu Omicron**	May 19, 1990	DeSales University	Center Valley, Pennsylvania	Active	
302	**Mu Pi**	May 24, 1990	Georgia Southwestern State University School of Nursing	Americus, Georgia	Active	
303	**Mu Rho**	March 8, 1992	University of South Carolina Upstate	Spartanburg, South Carolina	Active	
304	**Mu Sigma**	March 24, 1992	University of Alberta Faculty of Nursing	Edmonton, Alberta, Canada	Active	
305	**Mu Tau**	March 29, 1992	North Carolina A&T State University School of Nursing	Greensboro, North Carolina	Active	
306	**Mu Upsilon**	April 4, 1992	College of Staten Island	Staten Island, New York	Active	
307	**Mu Phi**	April 4, 1992	Kennesaw State University Wellstar School of Nursing	Kennesaw, Georgia	Active	
307	**Mu Phi**	April 4, 1992	WellStar Cobb Medical Center	Austell, Georgia	Active	
307	**Mu Phi**	April 4, 1992	WellStar Douglas Hospital	Douglasville, Georgia	Active	
307	**Mu Phi**	April 4, 1992	WellStar Kennestone Regional Medical Center	Marietta, Georgia	Active	
307	**Mu Phi**	April 4, 1992	WellStar Paulding Hospital	Hiram, Georgia	Active	
308	**Mu Chi**	April 5, 1992	Fairfield University School of Nursing	Fairfield, Connecticut	Active	
309	**Mu Psi**	April 5, 1992	Queens University of Charlotte Presbyterian School of Nursing	Charlotte, North Carolina	Active	
310	**Mu Omega**	April 5, 1992	Purdue University Northwest School of Nursing	Hammond, Indiana	Active	
311	**Nu Alpha**	April 10, 1992	Marshall University College of Health Professions - Department of Nursing	Huntington, West Virginia	Active	
312	**Nu Beta**	April 12, 1992	Johns Hopkins School of Nursing	Baltimore, Maryland	Active	
312	**Nu Beta**	April 12, 1992	Johns Hopkins Bayview Medical Center	Baltimore, Maryland	Active	
312	**Nu Beta**	April 12, 1992	Johns Hopkins Hospital	Baltimore, Maryland	Active	
312	**Nu Beta**	April 12, 1992	Johns Hopkins Howard County Medical Center	Columbia, Maryland	Active	
312	**Nu Beta**	April 12, 1992	Johns Hopkins All Children's Hospital	St. Petersburg, Florida	Active	
312	**Nu Beta**	April 12, 1992	Sibley Memorial Hospital	Washington, D.C.	Active	
312	**Nu Beta**	April 12, 1992	Suburban Hospital	Bethesda, Maryland	Active	
313	**Nu Gamma**	April 21, 1992	Brenau University Mary Inez Grindle School of Nursing	Gainesville, Georgia	Active	
314	**Nu Delta**	April 25, 1992	Cleveland State University School of Nursing	Cleveland, Ohio	Active	
315	Nu Epsilon	April 26, 1992	Luther College	Decorah, Iowa	Inactive	
316	**Nu Zeta**	April 26, 1992	Fort Hays State University Department of Nursing	Hays, Kansas	Active	
317	**Nu Eta**	April 26, 1992	Drexel University College of Nursing and Health Professions	Philadelphia, Pennsylvania	Active	
318	Nu Theta	April 26, 1992	Edinboro University	Edinboro, Pennsylvania	Inactive	
319	**Nu Iota**	April 29, 1992	University of Nevada, Reno Orvis School of Nursing	Reno, Nevada	Active	
320	**Nu Kappa**	April 30, 1992	Colorado Mesa University Health Sciences Department - Nursing	Grand Junction, Colorado	Active	
321	**Nu Lambda**	May 3, 1992	Union University School of Nursing	Jackson, Tennessee	Active	
322	**Nu Mu**	May 9, 1992	California State University, Los Angeles School of Nursing	Los Angeles, California	Active	
323	**Nu Nu**	May 11, 1992	Weber State University School of Nursing	Ogden, Utah	Active	
324	**Nu Xi**	May 16, 1992	California State University, East Bay	Hayward, California	Active	
324	**Nu Xi**	May 16, 1992	Samuel Merritt University School of Nursing	Oakland, California	Active	
325	**Nu Omicron**	March 19, 1994	Bethel University	Mishawaka, Indiana	Active	
325	**Nu Omicron**	March 19, 1994	Goshen College	Goshen, Indiana	Active	
325	**Nu Omicron**	March 19, 1994	Saint Mary's College Department of Nursing	Notre Dame, Indiana	Active	
326	**Nu Pi**	January 1, 1994	Illinois College Department of Nursing	Jacksonville, Illinois	Active	
326	**Nu Pi**	January 1, 1994	Millikin University	Decatur, Illinois	Active	
326	**Nu Pi**	January 1, 1994	St. John's College of Nursing	Springfield, Illinois	Active	
327	**Nu Rho**	March 27, 1994	Nebraska Wesleyan University Department of Nursing	Lincoln, Nebraska	Active	
327	**Nu Rho**	March 27, 1994	Union Adventist University	Lincoln, Nebraska	Active	
328	**Nu Sigma**	April 7, 1994	Waynesburg University	Waynesburg, Pennsylvania	Active	
329	**Nu Tau**	April 7, 1994	Louisiana Christian University	Pineville, Louisiana	Active	
330	**Nu Upsilon**	April 7, 1994	Grand Canyon University	Phoenix, Arizona	Active	
331	**Nu Phi**	April 8, 1994	Austin Peay State University School of Nursing	Clarksville, Tennessee	Active	
332	**Nu Chi**	April 9, 1994	University of Missouri–St. Louis College of Nursing	St. Louis, Missouri	Active	
333	**Nu Psi**	April 9, 1994	San Francisco State University School of Nursing	San Francisco, California	Active	
334	**Nu Omega**	April 9, 1994	University of North Carolina Wilmington School of Nursing	Wilmington, North Carolina	Active	
335	**Xi Alpha**	April 10, 1994	Middle Tennessee State University School of Nursing	Murfreesboro, Tennessee	Active	
335	**Xi Alpha**	April 10, 1994	Maury Regional Medical Center	Columbia, Tennessee	Active	
336	**Xi Beta**	April 23, 1994	East Stroudsburg University	East Stroudsburg, Pennsylvania	Active	
337	**Xi Gamma**	April 17, 1994	Marywood University	Scranton, Pennsylvania	Active	
338	**Xi Delta**	April 17, 1994	West Chester University	West Chester, Pennsylvania	Active	
339	**Xi Epsilon**	April 22, 1994	California State University, Bakersfield Department of Nursing	Bakersfield, California	Active	
340	**Xi Omicron**	July 13, 1994	University of Notre Dame Australia, Sydney School of Nursing	Darlinghurst, New South Wales, Australia	Active	
340	**Xi Omicron**	July 13, 1994	University of Sydney	Camperdown, New South Wales, Australia	Active	
340	**Xi Omicron**	July 13, 1994	University of Newcastle	Newcastle, New South Wales, Australia	Active	
340	**Xi Omicron**	July 13, 1994	University of Technology Sydney Faculty of Health	Ultimo, New South Wales, Australia	Active	
340	**Xi Omicron**	July 13, 1994	University of Wollongong School of Nursing	Wollongong, New South Wales, Australia	Active	
340	**Xi Omicron**	July 13, 1994	Western Sydney University School of Nursing and Midwifery	Penrith South, New South Wales, Australia	Active	
341	**Xi Eta**	April 29, 1994	University of British Columbia School of Nursing	Vancouver, British Columbia, Canada	Active	
341	**Xi Eta**	April 29, 1994	University of Victoria School of Nursing	Victoria, British Columbia, Canada	Active	
342	**Xi Theta**	April 30, 1994	California State University, Dominguez Hills School of Nursing	Carson, California	Active	
343	**Xi Iota**	May 4, 1994	Midwestern State University Wilson School of Nursing	Wichita Falls, Texas	Active	
344	**Xi Kappa**	May 7, 1994	Concordia College	Moorhead, Minnesota	Active	
344	**Xi Kappa**	May 7, 1994	Minnesota State University Moorhead School of Nursing	Moorhead, Minnesota	Active	
344	**Xi Kappa**	May 7, 1994	Mayville State University	Mayville, North Dakota	Active	
344	**Xi Kappa**	May 7, 1994	North Dakota State University	Fargo, North Dakota	Active	
344	**Xi Kappa**	May 7, 1994	North Dakota State University at Sanford Health College of Nursing	Bismarck, North Dakota	Active	
344	**Xi Kappa**	May 7, 1994	University of Jamestown	Jamestown, North Dakota	Active	
345	**Xi Lambda**	May 15, 1994	University of Manitoba Faculty of Nursing	Winnipeg, Manitoba, Canada	Active	
346	**Xi Mu**	May 19, 1994	Linfield University	Portland, Oregon	Active	
347	**Xi Nu**	June 3, 1994	University of Saint Francis	Fort Wayne, Indiana	Active	
348	**Xi Xi**	June 5, 1994	Youngstown State University Bitonte College of Health and Human Services	Youngstown, Ohio	Active	
349	**Xi Omicron**	July 13, 1994	University of Notre Dame Australia Sydney campus	Darlinghurst, New South Wales, Australia	Active	
349	**Xi Omicron**	July 13, 1994	University of Sydney	Camperdown, New South Wales, Australia	Active	
349	**Xi Omicron**	July 13, 1994	University of Newcastle	Newcastle, New South Wales, Australia	Active	
349	**Xi Omicron**	July 13, 1994	University of Technology Sydney Faculty of Health	Ultimo, New South Wales, Australia	Active	
349	**Xi Omicron**	July 13, 1994	University of Wollongong School of Nursing	Wollongong, New South Wales, Australia	Active	
349	**Xi Omicron**	July 13, 1994	Western Sydney University School of Nursing and Midwifery	Penrith South, New South Wales, Australia	Active	
350	**Xi Pi**	March 30, 1996	Illinois State University Mennonite College of Nursing	Normal, Illinois	Active	
351	**Xi Rho**	April 13, 1996	Clayton State University School of Nursing	Morrow, Georgia	Active	
352	**Xi Sigma**	April 13, 1996	Northern Michigan University School of Nursing	Marquette, Michigan	Active	
353	**Xi Tau**	April 16, 1996	University of Charleston Department of Nursing	Charleston, West Virginia	Active	
354	**Xi Upsilon**	April 27, 1996	University of Lynchburg Department of Nursing	Lynchburg, Virginia	Active	
355	**Xi Phi**	April 28, 1996	University of Colorado Colorado Springs Bethel College of Nursing and Health Sciences	Colorado Springs, Colorado	Active	
356	**Xi Chi**	April 28, 1996	Millersville University	Millersville, Pennsylvania	Active	
357	**Xi Psi**	June 1, 1996	Dillard University	New Orleans, Louisiana	Active	
357	**Xi Psi**	June 1, 1996	Loyola University New Orleans School of Nursing	New Orleans, Louisiana	Active	
357	**Xi Psi**	June 1, 1996	University of Holy Cross	New Orleans, Louisiana	Active	
358	Xi Omega				Inactive	
359	Omicron Alpha		Upstate Medical University	Syracuse, New York	Inactive	
360	**Omicron Beta**	April 4, 1998	State University of New York Brockport	Brockport, New York	Active	
361	**Omicron Gamma**	March 29, 1998	Wilmington University	New Castle, Delaware	Active	
362	**Omicron Delta**	April 3, 1998	University of Phoenix College of Health Professions, School of Nursing	Phoenix, Arizona	Active	
363	**Omicron Epsilon**	April 4, 1998	Clarkson College Nursing Program	Omaha, Nebraska	Active	
364	**Omicron Zeta**	May 5, 1998	Patty Hanks Shelton School of Nursing	Abilene, Texas	Active	
364	**Omicron Zeta**	May 5, 1998	McMurry University Patty Hanks Shelton School of Nursing	Abilene, Texas	Active	
365	**Omicron Eta**	April 7, 1998	Stephen F. Austin State University Richard and Lucille DeWitt School of Nursing	Nacogdoches, Texas	Active	
366	Omicron Theta				Inactive	
367	**Omicron Iota**	April 16, 1998	Maryville University	St. Louis, Missouri	Active	
367	**Omicron Iota**	April 16, 1998	Mercy Hospital St. Louis	St. Louis, Missouri	Active	
368	Omicron Kappa				Inactive	
369	**Omicron Lambda**	April 20, 1998	Mississippi College School of Nursing	Clinton, Mississippi	Active	
370	**Omicron Mu**	April 23, 1998	Wheeling University	Wheeling, West Virginia	Active	
371	**Omicron Nu**	April 24, 1998	Missouri Western State University	St. Joseph, Missouri	Active	
372	**Omicron Omicron**	April 26, 1998	Good Samaritan College of Nursing and Health Sciences	Cincinnati, Ohio	Active	
372	**Omicron Omicron**	April 26, 1998	Mount St. Joseph University	Cincinnati, Ohio	Active	
372	**Omicron Omicron**	April 26, 1998	Xavier University School of Nursing	Cincinnati, Ohio	Active	
373	**Omicron Xi**	April 26, 1998	Husson University School of Health - Nursing	Bangor, Maine	Active	
373	**Omicron Xi**	April 26, 1998	University of Maine School of Nursing	Orono, Maine	Active	
373	**Omicron Xi**	April 26, 1998	University of Maine at Augusta	Augusta, Maine	Active	
374	Omicron Pi				Inactive	
375	**Omicron Rho**	April 29, 1998	Hartwick College	Oneonta, New York	Active	
376	**Omicron Sigma**	April 30, 1998	Maria College	Albany, New York	Active	
376	**Omicron Sigma**	April 30, 1998	State University of New York at New Paltz	New Paltz, New York	Active	
377	**Omicron Tau**	April 30, 1998	Minot State University	Minot, North Dakota	Active	
378	**Omicron Upsilon**	May 1, 1998	University of Portland School of Nursing & Health Innovations	Portland, Oregon	Active	
379	**Omicron Phi**	May 2, 1998	Belmont University School of Nursing	Nashville, Tennessee	Active	
380	**Omicron Chi**	May 13, 1998	Miami University Hamilton	Hamilton, Ohio	Active	
380	**Omicron Chi**	May 13, 1998	Miami University	Oxford, Ohio	Active	
381	**Omicron Psi**	May 14, 1998	University of Southern Indiana College of Nursing and Health Professions	Evansville, Indiana	Active	
382	**Omicron Omega**	May 14, 1998	California State Polytechnic University, Humboldt Department of Nursing	Arcata, California	Active	
383	**Pi Alpha**	May 15, 1998	FIU College of Nursing and Health Sciences	Miami, Florida	Active	
384	**Pi Beta**	May 15, 1998	Columbus State University School of Nursing	Columbus, Georgia	Active	
385	**Pi Gamma**	May 18, 1998	Mercer University Health Sciences Center Georgia Baptist College of Nursing	Atlanta, Georgia	Active	
385	**Pi Gamma**	May 18, 1998	Northside Hospital Atlanta	Atlanta, Georgia	Active	
385	**Pi Gamma**	May 18, 1998	Northside Hospital Cherokee	Canton, Georgia	Active	
385	**Pi Gamma**	May 18, 1998	Northside Hospital Forsyth	Cumming, Georgia	Active	
385	**Pi Gamma**	May 18, 1998	Northside Hospital Gwinnett	Lawrenceville, Georgia	Active	
386	**Pi Delta**	May 21, 1998	University of Michigan–Flint Department of Nursing	Flint, Michigan	Active	
387	**Pi Epsilon**	May 27, 1998	Emmanuel College	Boston, Massachusetts	Active	
387	**Pi Epsilon**	May 27, 1998	Labouré College of Healthcare	Milton, Massachusetts	Active	
387	**Pi Epsilon**	May 27, 1998	Regis College School of Nursing, Science & Health Professions	Weston, Massachusetts	Active	
388	**Pi Zeta**	May 30, 1998	Daemen University	Amherst, New York	Active	
389	**Pi Eta**	January 1, 2000	Graceland University School of Nursing	Independence, Missouri	Active	
390	**Pi Theta**	March 12, 2000	Eleanor Mann School of Nursing	Fayetteville, Arkansas	Active	
391	**Pi Iota**	January 1, 2000	Hong Kong Baptist University	Kowloon, Hong Kong	Active	
391	**Pi Iota**	January 1, 2000	The Nethersole School of Nursing	Sha Tin, Hong Kong	Active	
391	**Pi Iota**	January 1, 2000	Hong Kong Polytechnic University School of Nursing	Kowloon, Hong Kong	Active	
391	**Pi Iota**	January 1, 2000	University of Hong Kong	Pok Fu Lam, Hong Kong	Active	
391	**Pi Iota**	January 1, 2000	Tung Wah College	Kowloon, Hong Kong	Active	
392	**Pi Kappa**	March 27, 2000	Allen College	Waterloo, Iowa	Active	
393	**Pi Lambda**	April 1, 2000	University of South Carolina Aiken School of Nursing	Aiken, South Carolina	Active	
394	**Pi Mu**	April 2, 2000	Eastern Mennonite University	Harrisonburg, Virginia	Active	
395	**Pi Nu**	April 3, 2000	University of West Georgia	Carrollton, Georgia	Active	
396	**Pi Xi**	April 4, 2000	Delta State University Robert E. Smith School of Nursing	Cleveland, Mississippi	Active	
397	**Pi Omicron**	April 6, 2000	University of Texas Rio Grande Valley	Edinburg, Texas	Active	
398	**Pi Pi**	April 6, 2000	Blessing-Rieman College of Nursing and Health Sciences	Quincy, Illinois	Active	
399	Pi Rho	April 6, 2000 – 202x ?	California University of Pennsylvania	California, Pennsylvania	Inactive	
400	**Pi Sigma**	April 9, 2000	North Carolina Central University	Durham, North Carolina	Active	
401	**Pi Tau**	April 9, 2000	University of Tennessee at Martin	Martin, Tennessee	Active	
402	**Pi Upsilon**	April 10, 2000	Tennessee State University School of Nursing	Nashville, Tennessee	Active	
403	**Pi Phi**	April 18, 2000	Viterbo University	La Crosse, Wisconsin	Active	
404	**Pi Chi**	April 18, 2000	Malone University School of Nursing	Canton, Ohio	Active	
405	**Pi Psi**	April 29, 2000	Nazareth University Nursing Department	Rochester, New York	Active	
406	**Pi Omega**	April 6, 2000	New Mexico State University School of Nursing	Las Cruces, New Mexico	Active	
407	**Rho Alpha**	May 10, 2000	Dominican University of California Department of Nursing	San Rafael, California	Active	
408	**Rho Beta**	May 19, 2000	California State University, San Bernardino Department of Nursing	San Bernardino, California	Active	
409	**Rho Gamma**	May 11, 2000	Elmira College	Elmira, New York	Active	
410	**Rho Delta**	July 1, 2000	Aga Khan University	Karachi, Pakistan	Active	
411	**Rho Epsilon**	October 1, 2000	Stevenson University	Owings Mills, Maryland	Active	
412	**Rho Zeta**	March 8, 2002	Southeastern Louisiana University School of Nursing	Hammond, Louisiana	Active	
413	**Rho Eta**	March 10, 2002	Clarke University	Dubuque, Iowa	Active	
414	**Rho Theta**	March 21, 2002	Northern Kentucky University	Newport, Kentucky	Active	
415	**Rho Iota**	March 28, 2002	Southern Adventist University School of Nursing	Collegedale, Tennessee	Active	
416	**Rho Kappa**	April 6, 2002	Florida A&M University School of Nursing	Tallahassee, Florida	Active	
417	**Rho Lambda**	April 6, 2002	Winston-Salem State University School of Health Sciences - Division of Nursing	Winston-Salem, North Carolina	Active	
418	Rho Mu		Carson-Newman University	Jefferson City, Tennessee	Inactive	
419	**Rho Nu**	April 20, 2002	Dwight Schar College of Nursing & Health Sciences	Mansfield, Ohio	Active	
419	**Rho Nu**	April 20, 2002	Mount Vernon Nazarene University	Mount Vernon, Ohio	Active	
420	**Rho Xi**	April 20, 2002	Presentation College, South Dakota	Aberdeen, South Dakota	Active	(Note: This is an alumni chapter.)
421	**Rho Omicron**	April 22, 2002	Mount Carmel College of Nursing	Columbus, Ohio	Active	
422	**Rho Pi**	April 26, 2002	Shenandoah University Eleanor Wade Custer School of Nursing	Winchester, Virginia	Active	
423	**Rho Rho**	April 30, 2002	Dalhousie University School of Nursing	Halifax, Nova Scotia, Canada	Active	
424	Rho Sigma				Inactive	
425	**Rho Tau**	May 14, 2002	California State University, Stanislaus Department of Nursing	Turlock, California	Active	
426	**Rho Upsilon**	May 17, 2002	University of São Paulo Escola de Enfermagem de Ribeirão	Ribeirão Preto, Brazil	Active	
427	**Rho Phi**	May 19, 2002	Framingham State University	Framingham, Massachusetts	Active	
428	**Rho Chi**	September 20, 2002	HAN University of Applied Sciences Institute of Nursing Studies	Nijmegen, Gelderland, Netherlands	Active	
428	**Rho Chi**	September 20, 2002	Rotterdam University of Applied Sciences Institute of Healthcare Studies	Rotterdam, South Holland, Netherlands	Active	
428	**Rho Chi**	September 20, 2002	Saxion University of Applied Sciences Academie Gezondheidszorg	Enschede, Overijssel, Netherlands	Active	
428	**Rho Chi**	September 20, 2002	HU University of Applied Sciences Utrecht	Utrecht, Netherlands	Active	
428	**Rho Chi**	September 20, 2002	Utrecht University Department of Nursing Science	Utrecht, Netherlands	Active	
429	**Rho Psi**	December 8, 2002	Georgia Southern University School of Nursing	Statesboro, Georgia	Active	
430	Rho Omega		Truman State University	Kirksville, Missouri	Inactive	
431	**Tau Alpha**	March 24, 2004	Autonomous University of Nuevo León	Monterrey, Nuevo León, Mexico	Active	
432	**Tau Beta**	March 28, 2004	Delaware State University	Dover, Delaware	Active	
433	Tau Gamma		University of Ottawa	Ottawa, Ontario, Canada	Inactive	
434	Tau Delta		Bluefield State University	Bluefield West Virginia	Inactive	
435	**Tau Epsilon**	April 6, 2004	University of Mary Hardin–Baylor Scott & White College of Nursing	Belton, Texas	Active	
436	**Tau Zeta**	April 10, 2004	Florida Gulf Coast University School of Nursing	Fort Myers, Florida	Active	
437	**Tau Eta**	April 18, 2004	Alcorn State University School of Nursing	Natchez, Mississippi	Active	
438	**Tau Theta**	May 10, 2004	Uniformed Services University of the Health Sciences School of Nursing	Bethesda, Maryland	Active	
439	**Tau Iota**	May 13, 2004	Goldfarb School of Nursing at Barnes-Jewish College	St. Louis, Missouri	Active	
440	**Tau Kappa**	July 15, 2004	Excelsior University School of Nursing	Albany, New York	Active	
440	**Tau Kappa**	July 15, 2004	Siena College	Loudonville, New York	Active	
440	**Tau Kappa**	July 15, 2004	Empire State College	Saratoga Springs, New York	Active	
441	**Tau Lambda**	August 4, 2004	Moi University	Eldoret, Kenya	Active	
441	**Tau Lambda**	August 4, 2004	Muhimbili University of Health and Allied Sciences	Ilala District, Dar es Salaam, Tanzania	Active	
441	**Tau Lambda**	August 4, 2004	Nelson Mandela University Department of Nursing Science, North Campus	Port Elizabeth, Eastern Cape, South Africa	Active	
441	**Tau Lambda**	August 4, 2004	North-West University	North West, South Africa	Active	
441	**Tau Lambda**	August 4, 2004	University of Botswana	Gaborone, Botswana	Active	
441	**Tau Lambda**	August 4, 2004	University of Fort Hare Department of Nursing Science	East London, Eastern Cape, South Africa	Active	
441	**Tau Lambda**	August 4, 2004	University of KwaZulu-Natal School of Nursing	Durban, South Africa	Active	
441	**Tau Lambda**	August 4, 2004	University of Nairobi Faculty of Medicine, Department of Nursing Sciences	Nairobi, Kenya	Active	
441	**Tau Lambda**	August 4, 2004	University of the Free State School of Nursing	Bloemfontein, South Africa	Active	
442	**Tau Mu**	March 3, 2006	Carroll University	Waukesha, Wisconsin	Active	
443	**Tau Nu**	March 8, 2006	Yamaguchi University Faculty of Health Sciences	Ube, Yamaguchi, Japan	Active	
444	**Tau Xi**	March 11, 2006	Roberts Wesleyan University School of Nursing	Rochester, New York	Active	
445	**Tau Omicron**	March 18, 2006	Saint Francis Medical Center College of Nursing	Peoria, Illinois	Active	
446	**Tau Pi**	March 23, 2006	Southern University and A&M College School of Nursing	Baton Rouge, Louisiana	Active	
447	**Tau Rho**	March 25, 2006	Quinnipiac University	Hamden, Connecticut	Active	
448	**Tau Sigma**	2006	Cardinal Stritch University	Milwaukee, Wisconsin	Active	
448	**Tau Sigma**	2006	Columbia College of Nursing	Glendale, Wisconsin	Active	
449	**Tau Tau**	April 1, 2006	Nebraska Methodist College	Omaha, Nebraska	Active	
450	**Tau Upsilon**	April 2, 2006	University of Windsor School of Nursing	Windsor, Ontario, Canada	Active	
451	Tau Phi		Jefferson College of Health Sciences	Roanoke, Virginia	Inactive	
452	**Tau Chi**	April 11, 2006	Tarleton State University	Stephenville, Texas	Active	
453	**Tau Psi**	April 19, 2006	University of North Georgia	Dahlonega, Georgia	Active	
453	**Tau Psi**	April 19, 2006	Northeast Georgia Health System	Gainesville, Georgia	Active	
454	Tau Omega		University of Gothenburg, Sahlgreska Academy	Gothenburg, Sweden	Inactive	
455	**Upsilon Alpha**	April 29, 2006	Moravian University Helen S. Breidegam School of Nursing	Bethlehem, Pennsylvania	Active	
456	**Upsilon Beta**	April 29, 2006	California State University, Fullerton	Fullerton, California	Active	
457	Upsilon Gamma		Anderson University	Anderson, Indiana	Inactive	
458	**Upsilon Delta**	February 9, 2007	University of St. Francis	Joliet, Illinois	Active	
459	**Upsilon Epsilon**	March 18, 2007	Western Michigan University	Kalamazoo, Michigan	Active	
460	**Upsilon Zeta**	April 17, 2007	Alvernia University	Reading, Pennsylvania	Active	
461	**Upsilon Eta**	July 11, 2007	NUS Yong Loo Lin School of Medicine, Alice Lee Centre for Nursing Studies	Singapore	Active	
462	**Upsilon Theta**	July 21, 2007	William Carey University	Hattiesburg, Mississippi	Active	
463	**Upsilon Iota**	February 24, 2008	Mount Marty University	Yankton, South Dakota	Active	
464	**Upsilon Kappa**	March 8, 2008	University of West Florida	Pensacola, Florida	Active	
465	**Upsilon Lambda**	March 20, 2008	Mass General Brigham University of Health Professions	Boston, Massachusetts	Active	
466	**Upsilon Mu**	March 26, 2008	Cabarrus College of Health Sciences	Concord, North Carolina	Active	
466	**Upsilon Mu**	March 26, 2008	Wingate University	Wingate, North Carolina	Active	
467	**Upsilon Nu**	March 28, 2008	National University of Colombia Faculty of Nursing	Bogotá, Cundinamarca, Colombia	Active	
468	**Upsilon Xi**	April 4, 2008	Cardiff University, Health Park Campus	Cardiff, Wales, United Kingdom	Active	
468	**Upsilon Xi**	April 4, 2008	Swansea University	Swansea, Wales, United Kingdom	Active	
469	**Upsilon Omicron**	April 10, 2008	Anderson College of Nursing and Health Professions University of North Alabama	Florence, Alabama	Active	
470	**Upsilon Pi**	April 14, 2008	Langston University	Langston, Oklahoma	Active	
471	**Upsilon Rho**	April 16, 2008	Thomas Edison State University W. Cary Edwards School of Nursing and Health Professions	Trenton, New Jersey	Active	
472	**Upsilon Sigma**	April 24, 2008	Spring Hill College	Mobile, Alabama	Active	
473	**Upsilon Tau**	April 25, 2008	Research College of Nursing	Kansas City, Missouri	Active	
474	**Upsilon Upsilon**	April 25, 2008	Keuka College Division of Nursing	Keuka Park, New York	Active	
475	**Upsilon Phi**	September 30, 2008	Robert Morris University	Moon Township, Pennsylvania	Active	
476	**Upsilon Chi**	March 31, 2009	Nova Southeastern University College of Allied Health and Nursing	Fort Lauderdale, Florida	Active	
477	Upsilon Psi		St. Petersburg College	St. Petersburg, Florida	Inactive	
478	**Upsilon Omega**	May 12, 2009	Florida Southern College	Lakeland, Florida	Active	
479	**Phi Alpha**	May 15, 2009	Western University of Health Sciences	Pomona, California	Active	
480	**Phi Beta**	May 19, 2009	Concordia University Wisconsin	Mequon, Wisconsin	Active	
481	**Phi Gamma**	June 10, 2010	Virtual	Worldwide	Active	
482	**Phi Delta**	March 1, 2011	Griffith University School of Nursing and Midwifery	Brisbane, Queensland, Australia	Active	
482	**Phi Delta**	March 1, 2011	Queensland University of Technology School of Nursing and Midwifery	Kelvin Grove, Queensland, Australia	Active	
482	**Phi Delta**	March 1, 2011	University of the Sunshine Coast, Faculty of Science, Health and Education	Maroochydore, Queensland, Australia	Active	
483	**Phi Epsilon**	March 24, 2011	George Washington University School of Nursing	Washington, D.C.	Active	
484	Phi Zeta	April 7, 2011	Marian University	Fond du Lac, Wisconsin	Inactive	
485	**Phi Eta**	April 20, 2011	Walsh University	North Canton, Ohio	Active	
486	**Phi Theta**	April 30, 2011	California State University, San Marcos	San Marcos, California	Active	
487	**Phi Iota**	May 15, 2011	Texas A&M Health College of Nursing	Bryan, Texas	Active	
488	**Phi Kappa**	June 7, 2011	South University - Online	Orlando, Florida	Active	
488	**Phi Kappa**	June 7, 2011	South University, Austin	Round Rock, Texas	Active	
488	**Phi Kappa**	June 7, 2011	South University, Columbia	Columbia, South Carolina	Active	
488	**Phi Kappa**	June 7, 2011	South University, High Point	High Point, North Carolina	Active	
488	**Phi Kappa**	June 7, 2011	South University, Montgomery	Montgomery, Alabama	Active	
488	**Phi Kappa**	June 7, 2011	South University, Orlando	Orlando, Florida	Active	
488	**Phi Kappa**	June 7, 2011	South University, Richmond	Glen Allen, Virginia	Active	
488	**Phi Kappa**	June 7, 2011	South University, Savannah College of Nursing	Savannah, Georgia	Active	
488	**Phi Kappa**	June 7, 2011	South University, Tampa	Tampa, Florida	Active	
488	**Phi Kappa**	June 7, 2011	South University, Virginia Beach	Virginia Beach, Virginia	Active	
488	**Phi Kappa**	June 7, 2011	South University, West Palm Beach	Royal Palm Beach, Florida	Active	
489	**Phi Lambda**	June 18, 2011	Mount Saint Mary's University Department of Nursing	Los Angeles, California	Active	
490	**Phi Mu**	July 8, 2011	Bournemouth University School of Health and Social Care	Bournemouth, Dorset, England, United Kingdom	Active	
491	**Phi Nu**	July 29, 2011	Walden University	Minneapolis, Minnesota	Active	
492	**Phi Xi**	September 22, 2011	Escola Superior de Enfermagem de Coimbra	Coimbra, Portugal	Active	
493	**Phi Omicron**	October 15, 2011	Saint Anthony College of Nursing	Rockford, Illinois	Active	
494	**Phi Pi**	October 20, 2011	Chamberlain University	Downers Grove, Illinois	Active	
494	**Phi Pi**	October 20, 2011	Chamberlain University, Addison Campus	Addison, Illinois	Active	
494	**Phi Pi**	October 20, 2011	Chamberlain University, Arlington Campus	Arlington, Virginia	Active	
494	**Phi Pi**	October 20, 2011	Chamberlain University, Atlanta Campus	Atlanta, Georgia	Active	
494	**Phi Pi**	October 20, 2011	Chamberlain University, Charlotte Campus	Charlotte, North Carolina	Active	
494	**Phi Pi**	October 20, 2011	Chamberlain University, Chicago Campus	Chicago, Illinois	Active	
494	**Phi Pi**	October 20, 2011	Chamberlain University, Cleveland Campus	Cleveland, Ohio	Active	
494	**Phi Pi**	October 20, 2011	Chamberlain University, Columbus Campus	Columbus, Ohio	Active	
494	**Phi Pi**	October 20, 2011	Chamberlain University, Georgia Campus	Stockbridge, Georgia	Active	
494	**Phi Pi**	October 20, 2011	Chamberlain University, Houston Campus	Houston, Texas	Active	
494	**Phi Pi**	October 20, 2011	Chamberlain University, Indianapolis Campus	Indianapolis, Indiana	Active	
494	**Phi Pi**	October 20, 2011	Chamberlain University, Irving Campus	Irving, Texas	Active	
494	**Phi Pi**	October 20, 2011	Chamberlain University, Jacksonville Campus	Jacksonville, Florida	Active	
494	**Phi Pi**	October 20, 2011	Chamberlain University, Las Vegas Campus	Las Vegas, Nevada	Active	
494	**Phi Pi**	October 20, 2011	Chamberlain University, Miramar Campus	Miramar, Florida	Active	
494	**Phi Pi**	October 20, 2011	Chamberlain University, New Orleans Campus	Jefferson, Louisiana	Active	
494	**Phi Pi**	October 20, 2011	Chamberlain University, North Brunswick Campus	North Brunswick, New Jersey	Active	
494	**Phi Pi**	October 20, 2011	Chamberlain University, Pearland Campus	Pearland, Texas	Active	
494	**Phi Pi**	October 20, 2011	Chamberlain University, Phoenix Campus	Phoenix, Arizona	Active	
494	**Phi Pi**	October 20, 2011	Chamberlain University, Sacramento Campus	Rancho Cordova, California	Active	
494	**Phi Pi**	October 20, 2011	Chamberlain University, St. Louis Campus	St. Louis, Missouri	Active	
494	**Phi Pi**	October 20, 2011	Chamberlain University, Tinley Park Campus	Tinley Park, Illinois	Active	
494	**Phi Pi**	October 20, 2011	Chamberlain University, Troy Campus	Troy, Michigan	Active	
495	**Phi Rho**	March 9, 2012	Purdue University Global	West Lafayette, Indiana	Active	
496	**Phi Sigma**	March 11, 2012	Ramapo College	Mahwah, New Jersey	Active	
497	**Phi Tau**	March 29, 2012	Thomas University	Thomasville, Georgia	Active	
498	**Phi Upsilon**	April 15, 2012	Gardner–Webb University School of Nursing	Boiling Springs, North Carolina	Active	
499	**Phi Phi**	August 24, 2012	Methodist College	Peoria, Illinois	Active	
500	**Phi Chi**	February 15, 2013	University of Houston	Houston, Texas	Active	
501	**Phi Psi**	March 23, 2013	Appalachian State University	Boone, North Carolina	Active	
502	**Phi Omega**	June 15, 2013	Burapha University	Chonburi, Thailand	Active	
502	**Phi Omega**	June 15, 2013	Chiang Mai University Faculty of Nursing	Chiang Ma, Thailand	Active	
502	**Phi Omega**	June 15, 2013	Chulalongkorn University Faculty of Nursing	Pathum Wan, Bangkok, Thailand	Active	
502	**Phi Omega**	June 15, 2013	Khon Kaen University	Khon Kaen, Thailand	Active	
502	**Phi Omega**	June 15, 2013	Mahidol University / Ramathibodi Hospital	Bangkok, Thailand	Active	
502	**Phi Omega**	June 15, 2013	Mahidol University Faculty of Nursing	Bangkok, Thailand	Active	
502	**Phi Omega**	June 15, 2013	Prince of Songkla University Faculty of Medicine	Hat Yai, Songkla, Thailand	Active	
503	**Chi Alpha**	July 24, 2013	American Sentinel College of Nursing and Health Sciences	Aurora, Colorado	Active	
503	**Chi Alpha**	July 24, 2013	Denver College of Nursing	Denver, Colorado	Active	
504	**Chi Beta**	August 18, 2013	West Coast University	Irvine, California	Active	
504	**Chi Beta**	August 18, 2013	West Coast University Dallas Campus	Dallas Texas	Active	
504	**Chi Beta**	August 18, 2013	West Coast University Los Angeles Campus	North Hollywood, Los Angeles, California	Active	
504	**Chi Beta**	August 18, 2013	West Coast University Miami Campus	Doral, Florida	Active	
504	**Chi Beta**	August 18, 2013	West Coast University Ontario Campus	Ontario, California	Active	
504	**Chi Beta**	August 18, 2013	West Coast University Orange County Campus	Anaheim, California	Active	
505	**Chi Gamma**	September 12, 2013	Farmingdale State College	East Farmingdale, New York	Active	
506	**Chi Delta**	September 20, 2013	Erebuni Medical Academy Foundation	Yerevan, Armenia	Active	
507	**Chi Epsilon**	February 21, 2014	Endicott College	Beverly, Massachusetts	Active	
508	**Chi Zeta**	March 26, 2014	Chatham University	Pittsburgh, Pennsylvania	Active	
509	**Chi Eta**	June 23, 2014	MidAmerica Nazarene University	Olathe, Kansas	Active	
510	**Chi Theta**	August 1, 2014	Massachusetts College of Pharmacy and Health Sciences Boston Campus	Boston, Massachusetts	Active	
510	**Chi Theta**	August 1, 2014	Massachusetts College of Pharmacy and Health Sciences Manchester Campus	Manchester, Massachusetts	Active	
510	**Chi Theta**	August 1, 2014	Massachusetts College of Pharmacy and Health Sciences Worcester Campus	Worcester, Massachusetts	Active	
511	**Chi Iota**	September 13, 2014	American University of Beirut	Beirut, Lebanon	Active	
514	**Chi Mu**	October 24, 2014	California Baptist University	Riverside, California	Active	
515	**Chi Nu**	May 1, 2015	MacEwan University	Edmonton, Alberta, Canada	Active	
516	**Chi Xi**	August 13, 2015	Tshwane University of Technology Department of Nursing Science	Pretoria, Gauteng, South Africa	Active	
516	**Chi Xi**	August 13, 2015	University of Eswatini Faculty of Health Sciences	Mbabane, Hhohho, Eswatini	Active	
516	**Chi Xi**	August 13, 2015	University of Johannesburg Department of Nursing	Johannesburg, South Africa	Active	
516	**Chi Xi**	August 13, 2015	University of Malawi Kamuzu College of Nursing	Lilongwe, Malawi	Active	
516	**Chi Xi**	August 13, 2015	University of Pretoria Department of Nursing Sciences	Pretoria, South Africa	Active	
516	**Chi Xi**	August 13, 2015	University of South Africa College of Humanities Department of Health Studies	Unisa, South Africa	Active	
516	**Chi Xi**	August 13, 2015	University of the Witwatersrand Department of Nursing	Johannesburg, South Africa	Active	
517	**Chi Omicron**	August 13, 2015	University of Ghana Department of Nursing	Accra, Ghana	Active	
518	**Chi Pi**	August 30, 2015	Frontier Nursing University	Versailles, Kentucky	Active	
519	**Chi Rho**	September 11, 2015	Trinity College of Nursing and Health Sciences	Rock Island, Illinois	Active	
520	**Chi Sigma**	October 2, 2015	Western Illinois University	Macomb, Illinois	Active	
521	**Chi Tau**	December 18, 2015	State University of New York at Delhi	Delhi, New York	Active	
521	**Chi Tau**	December 18, 2015	State University of New York at Morrisville	Morrisville, New York	Active	
522	**Chi Upsilon**	March 13, 2016	AdventHealth University	Orlando, Florida	Active	
523	**Chi Phi**	March 15, 2016	Palm Beach Atlantic University	West Palm Beach, Florida	Active	
524	**Chi Chi**	March 24, 2016	Westminster University School of Nursing	Salt Lake City, Utah	Active	
525	**Chi Psi**	April 22, 2016	St. David's School of Nursing	Round Rock, Texas	Active	
526	**Chi Omega**	April 28, 2016	Lake Superior State University School of Nursing and Health Sciences	Sault Ste. Marie, Michigan	Active	
527	**Psi Alpha**	August 13, 2016	Curtin University Faculty of Health Sciences	Perth, Western Australia, Australia	Active	
527	**Psi Alpha**	August 13, 2016	Edith Cowan University	Joondalup, Western Australia, Australia	Active	
527	**Psi Alpha**	August 13, 2016	University of Notre Dame Australia	Fremantle, Western Australia, Australia	Active	
528	**Psi Beta**	August 23, 2016	Silliman University College of Nursing	Dumaguete City, Negros Oriental, Philippines	Active	
529	Psi Gamma				Inactive	
530	**Psi Delta**	October 1, 2016	Liberty University	Lynchburg, Virginia	Active	
531	**Psi Epsilon**	October 2, 2016	McKendree University	Lebanon, Illinois	Active	
532	**Psi Zeta**	November 17, 2016	Deakin University	Waurn Ponds, Victoria, Australia	Active	
532	**Psi Zeta**	November 17, 2016	Federation University Australia	Ballarat, Victoria, Australia	Active	
532	**Psi Zeta**	November 17, 2016	La Trobe University	Bundoora, Melbourne, Australia	Active	
532	**Psi Zeta**	November 17, 2016	Monash University, Clayton campus	Clayton, Victoria, Australia	Active	
532	**Psi Zeta**	November 17, 2016	University of Tasmania School of Nursing and Midwifery	Launceston, Tasmania, Australia	Active	
532	**Psi Zeta**	November 17, 2016	Victoria University	St Albans, Victoria, Australia	Active	
533	**Psi Eta**	November 21, 2016	Flinders University College of Nursing and Health Sciences	Adelaide, South Australia, Australia	Active	
534	**Psi Theta**	December 10, 2016	Concordia University Irvine	Irvine, California	Active	
534	**Psi Theta**	December 10, 2016	Vanguard University of Southern California	Costa Mesa, California	Active	
535	**Psi Iota**	December 16, 2016	University of St. Thomas School of Nursing	Houston, Texas	Active	
536	**Psi Kappa**	February 20, 2017	University of Jordan Clinical Department of Nursing	Amman, Jordan	Active	
537	Psi Lambda	2017–c. 2024	Oak Point University	Chicago, Illinois	Inactive	(Note: The college closed in April 2024.)
538	**Psi Mu**	March 11, 2017	Caldwell University	Caldwell, New Jersey	Active	
539	Psi Nu	March 23, 2017 – 2021	Concordia College	Bronxville, New York	Inactive	(Note: Concordia College closed in 2021.)
540	**Psi Xi**	March 29, 2017	University of Saint Mary	Leavenworth, Kansas	Active	
541	**Psi Omicron**	March 30, 2017	Davenport University	Grand Rapids, Michigan	Active	
542	**Psi Pi**	March 30, 2017	Saint Joseph's University	Lancaster, Pennsylvania	Active	
543	**Psi Rho**	March 30, 2017	Middle Georgia State University	Macon, Georgia	Active	
544	**Psi Sigma**	April 10, 2017	Colby–Sawyer College School of Nursing and Health Profressions	New London, New Hampshire	Active	
545	**Psi Tau**	April 24, 2017	SUNY Downstate Health Sciences University, College of Nursing	Brooklyn, New York	Active	
546	**Psi Upsilon**	July 12, 2017	Western Governors University	Salt Lake City, Utah	Active	
546	**Psi Upsilon**	July 12, 2017	Western Governors University - California	Santa Ana, California	Active	
546	**Psi Upsilon**	July 12, 2017	Western Governors University - Indiana	Indianapolis, Indiana	Active	
546	**Psi Upsilon**	July 12, 2017	Western Governors University - Missouri	Clayton, Missouri	Active	
546	**Psi Upsilon**	July 12, 2017	Western Governors University - North Carolina	Raleigh, North Carolina	Active	
546	**Psi Upsilon**	July 12, 2017	Western Governors University - Tennessee	Franklin, Tennessee	Active	
546	**Psi Upsilon**	July 12, 2017	Western Governors University - Texas	Austin, Texas	Active	
546	**Psi Upsilon**	July 12, 2017	Western Governors University - Washington	Seattle, Washington	Active	
547	**Psi Phi**	October 5, 2017	Lipscomb University	Nashville, Tennessee	Active	
548	Psi Chi				Inactive	
549	**Psi Psi**	April 15, 2018	Georgian Court University Hackensack Meridian Health School of Nursing	Lakewood Township, New Jersey	Active	
550	**Psi Omega**	April 26, 2018	Christ College of Nursing & Health Sciences	Cincinnati, Ohio	Active	
550	**Psi Omega**	April 26, 2018	Christ Hospital Health Network	Cincinnati, Ohio	Active	
551	**Omega Alpha**	April 26, 2018	Touro University California	Vallejo, California	Active	
552	**Omega Beta**	May 3, 2018	University of South Dakota	Vermillion, South Dakota	Active	
553	**Omega Gamma**	August 10, 2018	Capella University	Minneapolis, Minnesota	Active	
554	**Omega Delta**	November 18, 2018	Pace University Lienhard School of Nursing	Pleasantville, New York	Active	
555	**Omega Epsilon**	November 29, 2018	Munster Technological University Department of Nursing and Health Care Sciences	Tralee, County Kerry, Ireland	Active	
555	**Omega Epsilon**	November 29, 2018	Royal College of Surgeons in Ireland School of Nursing	Dublin, Ireland	Active	
555	**Omega Epsilon**	November 29, 2018	University College Dublin Health Sciences Centre	Dublin, Ireland	Active	
555	**Omega Epsilon**	November 29, 2018	South East Technological University Department of Nursing and Health Care	Waterford, Munster, Ireland	Active	
555	**Omega Epsilon**	November 29, 2018	University College Cork Catherine McAuley School of Nursing and Midwifery	Cork, Munster, Ireland	Active	
555	**Omega Epsilon**	November 29, 2018	University of Limerick Department of Nursing and Midwifery	Limerick, Ireland	Active	
556	**Omega Zeta**	February 26, 2019	James Madison University School of Nursing	Harrisonburg, Virginia	Active	
557	**Omega Eta**	April 4, 2019	Wilson College	Chambersburg, Pennsylvania	Active	
558	**Omega Theta**	April 12, 2019	Pennsylvania College of Technology	Williamsport, Pennsylvania	Active	
559	**Omega Iota**	April 22, 2019	Arkansas Tech University	Russellville, Arkansas	Active	
560	**Omega Kappa**	May 30, 2019	University of the West Indies at Mona Mona Faculty of Medical Sciences Western Jamaica Campus	Mona, Kingston, Jamaica	Active	
561	**Omega Lambda**	September 25, 2019	University of Haifa Department of Nursing	Mount Carmel, Israel	Active	
562	**Omega Mu**	October 6, 2019	Vermont State University	Randolph Center, Vermont	Active	
563	**Omega Nu**	October 15, 2019	LIU Brooklyn	Brooklyn, New York	Active	
564	**Omega Xi**	October 18, 2019	Queen Margaret University Division of Nursing	Edinburgh, Scotland, United Kingdom	Active	
565	**Omega Omicron**	December 10, 2019	Southwest Minnesota State University	Marshall, Minnesota	Active	
566	**Omega Pi**	March 21, 2020	Saint Mary-of-the-Woods College	Saint Mary-of-the-Woods, Indiana	Active	
567	**Omega Rho**	March 23, 2020	Eagle Gate College Murray Campus	Murray, Utah	Active	
567	**Omega Rho**	March 23, 2020	Provo College	Provo, Utah	Active	
567	**Omega Rho**	March 23, 2020	Unitek College, Bakersfield Campus	Bakersfield, California	Active	
567	**Omega Rho**	March 23, 2020	Unitek College, Fremont Campus	Fremont, California	Active	
567	**Omega Rho**	March 23, 2020	Brookline College Albuquerque	Albuquerque, New Mexico	Active	
567	**Omega Rho**	March 23, 2020	Eagle Gate College, Boise	Boise, Idaho	Active	
567	**Omega Rho**	March 23, 2020	Unitek College, Concord Campus	Concord, California	Active	
567	**Omega Rho**	March 23, 2020	Eagle Gate College, Idaho Falls	Idaho Falls, Idaho	Active	
567	**Omega Rho**	March 23, 2020	Eagle Gate College, Layton Campus	Layton, Utah	Active	
567	**Omega Rho**	March 23, 2020	Brookline College, Phoenix Campus	Phoenix, Arizona	Active	
567	**Omega Rho**	March 23, 2020	Unitek College, Reno Campus	Reno, Nevada	Active	
567	**Omega Rho**	March 23, 2020	Unitek College, Sacramento Campus	Sacramento, California	Active	
567	**Omega Rho**	March 23, 2020	Utah Tech University	St. George, Utah	Active	
568	Omega Sigma		Metropolitan State University		Inactive	
569	Omega Tau				Inactive	
570	**Omega Upsilon**	April 2, 2020	University of North Carolina at Pembroke	Pembroke, North Carolina	Active	
571	**Omega Phi**	April 3, 2020	Columbia College	Columbia, Missouri	Active	
572	**Omega Chi**	April 3, 2020	Southeastern University	Lakeland, Florida	Active	
573	**Omega Psi**	April 24, 2020	Fayetteville State University	Fayetteville, North Carolina	Active	
574	**Omega Omega**	April 25, 2020	National University	San Diego, California	Active	
575	**Alpha Alpha Alpha**	April 25, 2020	University of St. Augustine for Health Sciences	St. Augustine, Florida	Active	
576	**Alpha Alpha Beta**	May 10, 2020	University of Genoa	Genoa, Liguria, Italy	Active	
577	**Alpha Alpha Gamma**	May 23, 2020	University of Applied Health Sciences	Zagreb, Croatia	Active	
578	**Alpha Alpha Delta**	June 5, 2020	Lakeview College of Nursing	Danville, Illinois	Active	
579	**Alpha Alpha Epsilon**	September 17, 2020	Colorado Technical University Schaumburg	Schaumburg, Illinois	Active	
580	**Alpha Alpha Zeta**	October 5, 2020	Bryan College of Health Sciences	Lincoln, Nebraska	Active	
581	**Alpha Alpha Eta**	October 11, 2020	King Saud University College of Nursing	Riyadh, Saudi Arabia	Active	
582	**Alpha Alpha Theta**	October 15, 2020	University of Ha'il College of Nursing	Ha'il, Saudi Arabia	Active	
583	**Alpha Alpha Iota**	October 28, 2020	Lindsey Wilson University	Columbia, Kentucky	Active	
584	**Alpha Alpha Kappa**	November 1, 2020	Cumberland University	Lebanon, Tennessee	Active	
585	**Alpha Alpha Lambda**	November 3, 2020	Stanford Children's Health	Palo Alto, California	Active	
585	**Alpha Alpha Lambda**	November 3, 2020	Stanford Health Care	Palo Alto, California	Active	
586	**Alpha Alpha Mu**	November 5, 2020	Lee University	Cleveland, Tennessee	Active	
587	**Alpha Alpha Nu**	November 12, 2020	Hofstra University	Hempstead, New York	Active	
587	**Alpha Alpha Nu**	November 12, 2020	Cohen Children's Medical Center	New Hyde Park, New York	Active	
587	**Alpha Alpha Nu**	November 12, 2020	Glen Cove Hospital	Glen Cove, New York	Active	
587	**Alpha Alpha Nu**	November 12, 2020	Lenox Hill Hospital	Manhattan, New York	Active	
587	**Alpha Alpha Nu**	November 12, 2020	Long Island Jewish Forest Hills	Forest Hills, Queens, New York City, New York	Active	
587	**Alpha Alpha Nu**	November 12, 2020	Long Island Jewish Medical Center	New Hyde Park, New York	Active	
587	**Alpha Alpha Nu**	November 12, 2020	Long Island Jewish Valley Stream	Valley Stream, New York	Active	
587	**Alpha Alpha Nu**	November 12, 2020	Mather Hospital	Port Jefferson, New York	Active	
587	**Alpha Alpha Nu**	November 12, 2020	North Shore University Hospital	Manhasset, New York	Active	
587	**Alpha Alpha Nu**	November 12, 2020	Northern Westchester Hospital	Mount Kisco, New York	Active	
587	**Alpha Alpha Nu**	November 12, 2020	Northwell Health	New Hyde Park, New York	Active	
587	**Alpha Alpha Nu**	November 12, 2020	Phelps Memorial Hospital Center	Sleepy Hollow, New York	Active	
587	**Alpha Alpha Nu**	November 12, 2020	Plainview Hospital	Plainview, New York	Active	
587	**Alpha Alpha Nu**	November 12, 2020	South Oaks Hospital	Amityville, New York	Active	
587	**Alpha Alpha Nu**	November 12, 2020	Southside Hospital	Bay Shore, New York	Active	
587	**Alpha Alpha Nu**	November 12, 2020	Staten Island University Hospital North Campus	Staten Island, New York	Active	
587	**Alpha Alpha Nu**	November 12, 2020	Staten Island University Hospital, South Campus	Staten Island, New York	Active	
587	**Alpha Alpha Nu**	November 12, 2020	Syosset Hospital	Syossett, New York	Active	
587	**Alpha Alpha Nu**	November 12, 2020	Zucker Hillside Hospital	Glen Oaks, Queens, New York City, New York	Active	
588	Alpha Alpha Xi	November 19, 2020	Sam Houston State University	Huntsville, Texas	Active	
589	Alpha Alpha Omicron		University of South Carolina	Beaufort, South Carolina	Inactive	
590	**Alpha Alpha Pi**	April 11, 2021	Anderson University	Anderson, South Carolina	Active	
591	**Alpha Alpha Rho**	April 20, 2021	Florida SouthWestern State College	Fort Myers, Florida	Active	
592	**Alpha Alpha Sigma**	May 1, 2021	American University of Health Sciences	Signal Hill, California	Active	
593	**Alpha Alpha Tau**	July 14, 2021	Bushnell University	Eugene, Oregon	Active	
594	**Alpha Alpha Upsilon**	October 13, 2021	Obafemi Awolowo University College of Health Sciences	Ile-Ife, Osun State, Nigeria	Active	
595	**Alpha Alpha Ph**	October 16, 2021	University of the Philippines Manila College of Nursing	Manila, Philippines	Active	
596	**Alpha Alpha Chi**	October 23, 2021	Schreiner University	Kerrville, Texas	Active	
596	**Alpha Alpha Chi**	October 23, 2021	Peterson Regional Medical Center	Kerrville, Texas	Active	
597	**Alpha Alpha Psi**	October 24, 2021	Charles R. Drew University of Medicine and Science	Los Angeles, California	Active	
598	Alpha Alpha Omega				Inactive	
599	**Alpha Beta Alpha**	December 4, 2021	Aspen University	Denver, Colorado	Active	
600	**Alpha Beta Beta**	December 6, 2021	University of the Western Cape School of Nursing Science	Cape Town, Western Cape, South Africa	Active	
601	**Alpha Beta Gamma**	December 7, 2021	Babcock University	Ilishan-Remo, Ogun State, Nigeria	Active	
602	**Alpha Beta Delta**	March 1, 2022	Sultan Qaboos University	Muscat, Oman	Active	
603	**Alpha Beta Epsilon**	April 4, 2022	Miami Dade College, Medical Campus	Miami, Florida	Active	
603	**Alpha Beta Epsilon**	April 4, 2022	Baptist Health South Florida	Miami, Florida	Active	
604	**Alpha Beta Zeta**	April 6, 2022	Galen College of Nursing	Louisville, Kentucky	Active	
605	**Alpha Beta Eta**	April 7, 2022	United States University	Atlanta, Georgia	Active	
606	**Alpha Beta Theta**	April 8, 2022	Texas Tech University Health Sciences Center El Paso	El Paso, Texas	Active	
607	**Alpha Beta Iota**	April 29, 2022	Herzing University - Atlanta	Atlanta, Georgia	Active	
607	**Alpha Beta Iota**	April 29, 2022	Herzing University - Brookfield	Brookfield, Wisconsin	Active	
607	**Alpha Beta Iota**	April 29, 2022	Herzing University - Kenosha	Kenosha, Wisconsin	Active	
607	**Alpha Beta Iota**	April 29, 2022	Herzing University - Madison	Madison, Wisconsin	Active	
607	**Alpha Beta Iota**	April 29, 2022	Herzing University - Minneapolis	Crystal, Wisconsin	Active	
607	**Alpha Beta Iota**	April 29, 2022	Herzing University - Nashville	Nashville, Tennessee	Active	
607	**Alpha Beta Iota**	April 29, 2022	Herzing University - New Orleans	Metairie, Louisiana	Active	
607	**Alpha Beta Iota**	April 29, 2022	Herzing University - Online	Milwaukee, Wisconsin	Active	
607	**Alpha Beta Iota**	April 29, 2022	Herzing University - Orlando	Winter Park, Florida	Active	
607	**Alpha Beta Iota**	April 29, 2022	Herzing University - Tampa	Tampa, Florida	Active	
608	**Alpha Beta Kappa**	May 22, 2022	University of Tabuk Faculty of Nursing	Tabuk, Saudi Arabia	Active	
609	**Alpha Beta Lambda**	May 28, 2022	Padjadjaran University Faculty of Nursing	Jatinangor, Sumedang Regency, Indonesia	Active	
609	**Alpha Beta Lambda**	May 28, 2022	University of Indonesia Faculty of Nursing	Depok, West Java, Indonesia	Active	
610	**Alpha Beta Mu**	September 29, 2022	Mount Sinai Phillips School of Nursing	New York City, New York	Active	
611	**Alpha Beta Nu**	October 6, 2022	University of Eastern Finland Department of Nursing Science	Kuopio, Finland	Active	
612	**Alpha Beta Xi**	November 11, 2022	Nightingale College	Salt Lake City, Utah	Active	
613	**Alpha Beta Omicron**	November 14, 2022	Pontifical Catholic University of Chile	Santiago, Chile	Active	
614	**Alpha Beta Pi**	May 10, 2023	Umm al-Qura University	Mecca, Saudi Arabia	Active	
615	Alpha Beta Rho		University of Central Missouri	Warrensburg, Missouri	Inactive	
616	**Alpha Beta Sigma**	May 15, 2023	King Saud bin Abdulaziz University for Health Sciences Al-Ahsa College on Nursing	Al-Ahsa Governorate, Saudi Arabia	Active	
616	**Alpha Beta Sigma**	May 15, 2023	King Saud bin Abdulaziz University for Health Sciences Jeddah College of Nursing	Jeddah, Saudi Arabia	Active	
616	**Alpha Beta Sigma**	May 15, 2023	King Saud bin Abdulaziz University for Health Sciences Riyadh College of Nursing	Riyadh, Saudi Arabia	Active	
617	**Alpha Beta Tau**	May 31, 2023	Princess Nourah Bint Abdul Rahman University	Riyadh, Saudi Arabia	Active	
617	**Alpha Beta Tau**	May 31, 2023	King Abdullah bin Abdulaziz University Hospital	Riyadh, Saudi Arabia	Active	
618	**Alpha Beta Upsilon**	May 5, 2023	Njala University School of Community Health Sciences	Bo, Sierra Leone	Active	
618	**Alpha Beta Upsilon**	May 5, 2023	University of Sierra Leone College of Medicine and Allied Health Sciences	Freetown, Sierra Leone	Active	
619	**Alpha Beta Phi**	May 3, 2023	American College of Education	Indianapolis, Indiana	Active	
620	**Alpha Beta Chi**	May 19, 2023	Felician University	Lodi, New Jersey	Active	
621	**Alpha Beta Psi**	April 17, 2024	Longwood University	Farmville, Virginia	Active	
621	**Alpha Beta Psi**	April 17, 2024	Randolph–Macon College	Ashland, Virginia	Active	
622	**Alpha Beta Omega**	April 19, 2024	Shepherd University	Shepherdstown, West Virginia	Active	
623	**Alpha Gamma Alpha**	April 22, 2024	Universidad de Navarra Facultad de Enfermería	Pamplona, Spain	Active	
624	**Alpha Gamma Beta**	April 23, 2024	Seton Hill University	Greensburg, Pennsylvania	Active	
625	**Alpha Gamma Gamma**	April 29, 2024	Houston Methodist Hospital Center for Nursing Research	Houston, Texas	Active	
626	**Alpha Gamma Delta**	May 1, 2024	Saudi German Health Jeddah	Jeddah, Saudi Arabia	Active	
626	**Alpha Gamma Delta**	May 1, 2024	Saudi German Hospital Aseer	Khamis Mushait, Saudi Arabia	Active	
626	**Alpha Gamma Delta**	May 1, 2024	Saudi German Hospital Cairo	Cairo, Egypt	Active	
626	**Alpha Gamma Delta**	May 1, 2024	Saudi German Hospital Dammam	Dammam, Saudi Arabia	Active	
626	**Alpha Gamma Delta**	May 1, 2024	Saudi German Hospital Hail	Hail City, Saudi Arabia	Active	
626	**Alpha Gamma Delta**	May 1, 2024	Saudi German Hospital Makkah	Makkah, Saudi Arabia	Active	
626	**Alpha Gamma Delta**	May 1, 2024	Saudi German Hospital Riyadh	Riyadh, Saudi Arabia	Active	
626	**Alpha Gamma Delta**	May 1, 2024	Saudi German Hospitals Madinah	Madinah, Saudi Arabia	Active	
627	**Alpha Gamma Epsilon**	May 15, 2024	King Faisal Specialist Hospital and Research Centre - Jeddah	Jeddah, Saudi Arabia	Active	
628	**Alpha Gamma Zeta**	September 6, 2024	University of Arkansas–Fort Smith	Fort Smith, Arkansas	Active	
629	**Alpha Gamma Eta**	October 22, 2024	Berry College	Mount Berry, Georgia	Active	
629	**Alpha Gamma Eta**	October 22, 2024	Georgia Highlands College	Rome, Georgia	Active	
629	**Alpha Gamma Eta**	October 22, 2024	Shorter University	Rome, Georgia	Active	
629	**Alpha Gamma Eta**	October 22, 2024	Reinhardt University	Waleska, Georgia	Active	
630	**Alpha Gamma Theta**	December 13, 2024	Iona University	New Rochelle, New York	Active	
631	**Alpha Gamma Iota**	March 24, 2025	Riverside College of Health Sciences	Newport News, Virginia	Active	
632	**Alpha Gamma Kappa**	April 16, 2025	Manhattanville University	Purchase, New York	Active	
633	**Alpha Gamma Lambda**	April 24, 2025	LIU Post	Brookville, New York	Active	
634	**Alpha Gamma Mu**	May 14, 2025	King Abdulaziz University Hospital	Jeddah, Saudi Arabia	Active	
635	**Alpha Gamma Nu**	December 3, 2025	Joyce University of Nursing & Health Sciences	Draper, Utah	Active	

== See also ==
- List of Sigma Theta Tau members
