= Erebuni Medical Academy Foundation =

Private medical school in Yerevan, Armenia

- Type: Private medical school
- Established: 2019
- Location: 133 Titogradian Street, Yerevan, 0087, Armenia
- Language: Armenian and English
- Website: erebuniacademy.am/en/

Erebuni Medical Academy Foundation (Armenian: Էրեբունի Բժշկական Ակադեմիա Հիմնադրամը) is a private medical school in Yerevan, Armenia. It was founded in 2019. The academy offers Bachelor of Medicine, Bachelor of Surgery (BMBS), Bachelor of Nursing, and Doctor of Medicine degrees.

== History ==
Erebuni Medical Academy Foundation is a private medical school that was founded in 2019 in Yerevan, Armenia. The academy is licensed through the Ministry of Education and Science of the Republic of Armenia.

== Campus ==
Erebuni Medical Academy Foundation is located at 133 Titogradian Street in Yerevan. The academy has a student housing 4 kilometres (2.5 mi) from campus.

== Academics ==
Erebuni Medical Academy Foundation focuses on middle professional medical educational programs, including dental technician, medical cosmetology (nurse cosmetologist), midwifery, nursing, and pharmacy. It offers Bachelor of Medicine, Bachelor of Surgery (MBBS) degree, a Bachelor of Nursing, and a Doctor of Medicine. It also offers a degree in dentistry.

Its medical doctor and nursing programs are accredited by the Independent Agency for Accreditation and Rating (IAAR). It was accredited by the International Association for Quality Assurance in Pre-Tertiary & Higher Education (QAHE) in December 2023. The university is recognized by the World Health Organization and the National Medical Commission.

It has a chapter of Sigma Theta Tau international honor society for nursing.
