= Saudi German Hospitals =

Healthcare providers in the MENA region

Saudi German Hospitals Group

- Saudi-German hospital in Alexandria
- Native name: مستشفيات السعودي الألماني
- Traded as: Tadawul: 4009
- Industry: Healthcare Provider
- Founded: 1988
- Number of locations: 11 hospitals in 4 countries
- Area served: North Africa, Middle East
- Key people: Makarem Sobhi Batterjee (President) Eng. Sobhi Batterjee (Chairman) Dr. Khalid Batterjee – (Vice President)
- Services: Health Care Services
- Number of employees: 8500
- Divisions: Hospitals, Clinics and Pharmacies
- Website: saudigermanhealth.com

Saudi German Hospitals Group (Arabic: مستشفيات السعودي الألماني) is one of the largest healthcare providers in the MENA region with 11 hospitals and over 8500 employees operating across Saudi Arabia, the United Arab Emirates (UAE), Egypt, and Yemen.

In 1988, Eng. Sobhi Batterjee, Chairman of Saudi German Health, and Dr. Khalid Batterjee, Vice President of Saudi German Health, established the first hospital in Jeddah and collaborated with German University Hospitals to bring advanced German healthcare standards and expertise to the local community for the first time in the Kingdom of Saudi Arabia. These associations inspired the ‘German’ in the group's name.

== Facilities ==
The Saudi German Hospitals Group manages six multi-specialty tertiary hospitals in Saudi Arabia covering Jeddah, Asir, Riyadh, Madinah, Ḥaʼil and its latest facility in Dammam, which opened in February 2020 with an area of 39,000 square meters and a capacity of up to 300 beds and 100 clinics.

The Saudi German Hospitals Group operates three healthcare facilities in Dubai, Sharjah and Ajman.

The Saudi German Hospitals Group operates a healthcare facility in Cairo, Egypt and has announced plans to set up a medical city in Alexandria.

The Saudi German Hospitals Group operates one hospital in Sanaa, Yemen, which opened in 2006.

In 2018, the Saudi German Hospitals Group partnered with Zenata Development Corporation to establish a 300-bed hospital and six specialty blocks in Casablanca, Morocco.

In 2020, the Saudi German Hospitals Group has announced its plans to open hospital facilities in Morocco and Pakistan, as well as a new hospital in Mecca, Saudi Arabia.

As of January 2020, the Saudi German Hospitals Group had 2,700 beds, with 2.1 million average outpatients in a year.

== Medical Education ==
The Saudi German Hospitals Group focuses on education for medical professionals, students, communities and patients by providing educational programmes and activities to improve the knowledge of the workforce, training students of medicine and allied healthcare professions and specialties in Saudi Arabia, acting as an accredited hub for Saudi Commission for Health Specialties (SCFHS) post graduate training and Health Academy programme, sharing the knowledge and expertise of Saudi German Hospitals' doctors at regional and international events and conferences.

== Affiliations ==
=== International Visiting Professor Program ===
In 1988, the Saudi German Hospitals Group developed the International Visiting Professor Program (IVP) through which the Saudi German Hospitals Group collaborates with and brings leading physicians and surgeons, especially from Tier 1 western countries such as the United States, the United Kingdom, Canada, and Germany, to Saudi Arabia as visiting consultants.

=== Mayo Clinic Affiliation ===
In 2019, Saudi German Hospital Cairo became the first health care facility in Egypt and Africa to join the Mayo Clinic Care Network, a group of carefully vetted, independent health care systems that have special access to the knowledge and expertise of Mayo Clinic. In 2020, Saudi German Hospital in Riyadh also became affiliated with the Mayo Clinic.
