= Joyce University of Nursing & Health Sciences =

Nursing school in Draper, Utah, US

- Type: Private for-profit
- Established: 1979
- Location: 12257 Business Park Drive, Draper, Utah, 84020, United States; 40°31′41″N 111°53′34″W
- Campus: Suburban
- Website: joyce.edu

Joyce University of Nursing & Health Sciences is an American private for-profit higher educational institution located in Draper, Utah. It was established in 1979. The university offers associate's, bachelor's, and master's degrees in nursing.

== History ==
Joyce University of Nursing & Health Sciences is a private for-profit nursing and health sciences educational institution. It was established in 1979 in Draper, Utah.

== Campus ==
Joyce University of Nursing & Health Sciences has a suburban campus at 12257 Business Park Drive in Draper, Utah.

== Academics ==
Joyce University of Nursing & Health Sciences offers undergraduate and postgraduate certificates, an associate of science in nursing degree, a bachelor of science in nursing degree, and master of science in nursing degree. Its fields of study include clinical nursing, nursing administration, nursing research, registered nursing.

Joyce University of Nursing & Health Sciences is accredited by the Northwest Commission on Colleges and Universities. The university's nursing program is accredited by the Accreditation Commission for Education in Nursing.

The university has a chapter of Sigma Theta Tau, an international honor society in nursing.

== Students ==
Joyce University of Nursing & Health Sciences had 1,892 students in 2025. Of those students, 68 percent are White, fourteen percent are Hispanic, four percent are Asian, one percent are American Indian/Alaskan Native, one percent are Native Hawaiian/Pacific Islander, one percent are two or more races, and eight percent are unknown.
