= Silliman University College of Nursing =

Private university Dumaguete, Philippines

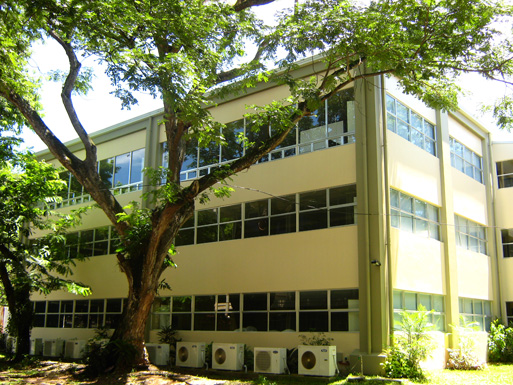
- Type: Private nursing school
- Established: 1947
- Location: Hibbard Avenue, Dumaguete, Philippines
- Website: www.su.edu.ph

The Silliman University College of Nursing (SUCN) is one of the constituent colleges of Silliman University, a private university in Dumaguete, Philippines. Established in 1947, the college was attached as a four-year program under the College of Arts and Sciences. In 1958, it implemented a five-year curriculum but reverted to its four-year baccalaureate program in 1976 when required to do so by the Department of Education and Culture (now the Department of Education).

The College of Nursing provides instruction in both the undergraduate and graduate levels. A Center of Excellence in Nursing Education, it is on Level IV accreditation status and one of the country's top nursing schools. In 2009, it ranked 1st in the Philippines based on licensure examination results. It has a total of 108 board topnotchers since 1951.

As one of the biggest academic units in the university, the college is housed in four buildings. These buildings are: Roble Hall which also houses the Office of the Dean; Mary Marquis Smith Hall; Olivia Villaflores-Yanson Hall and Ethel Chapman Hall. A fifth building named the William Barry Thompson Learning Resources Center is under construction. Its base hospital is the Silliman University Medical Center, but student nurses also get to be assigned in other hospitals in Dumaguete.

== Academic programs ==
=== Undergraduate ===
- B.S. in Nursing

=== Graduate ===
- Master of Science in Nursing Majors in:
  - Parent-Child Nursing
  - Nursing School Administration
  - Nursing Service Administration
  - Public Health Nursing
  - Medical Surgical Nursing
  - Psychiatric-Mental Nursing
  - Family Nursing Practice
  - Community Health Nursing and Adult Health
- Master in Nursing (non-thesis) Majors in:
  - Family Nursing Practice
  - Administration
  - Public Health Nursing
  - Adult Health and Psychiatric-Mental Health Nursing
- Ph.D. in Nursing

=== Pictures ===
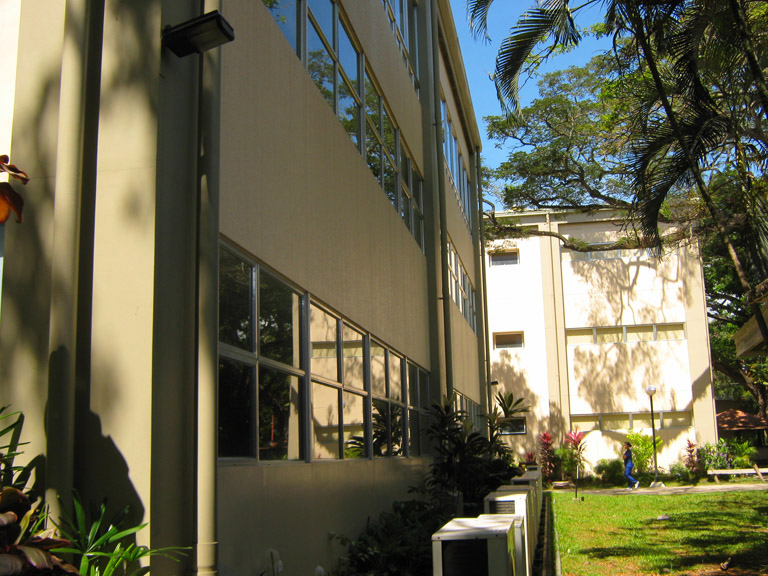
Smith and Yanson Halls

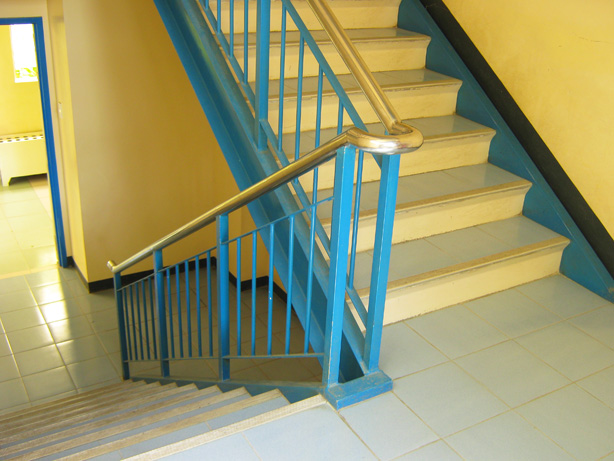
Eastern stairway, Mary Marquis Smith Hall

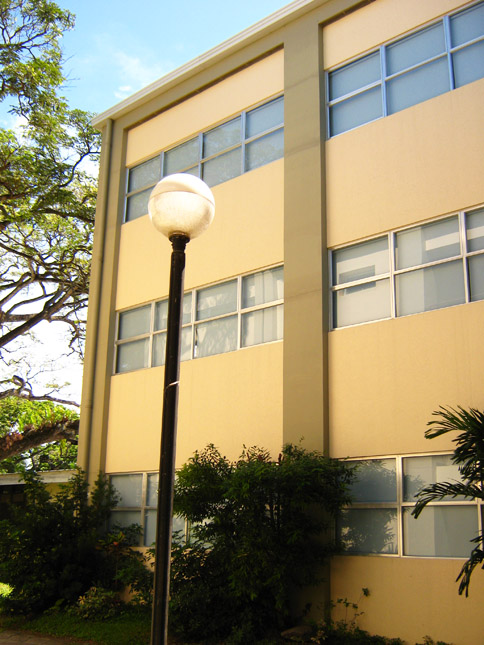
Western side, Mary Marquis Smith Hall

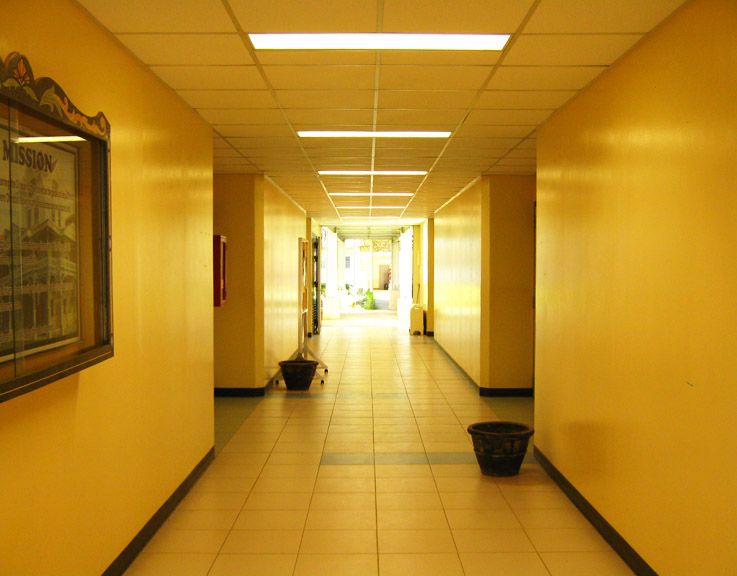
Hallway, Mary Marquis Smith Hall

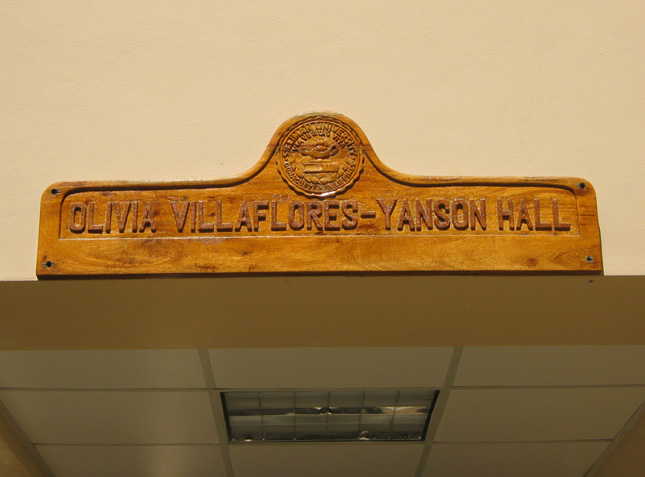
Yanson Hall nameplate

== Notable alumni ==
- Cynthia Cipres-Klein, Member, California Board of Registered Nursing (BRN).
- Luz Sobong Porter, Professor Emerita, Florida University
- Jean S. Yan, Chief Scientist, World Health Organization (Nursing and Midwifery)
