= FIU College of Nursing and Health Sciences =

Public college in Miami, Florida, US

FIU Nicole Wertheim College of Nursing and Health Sciences
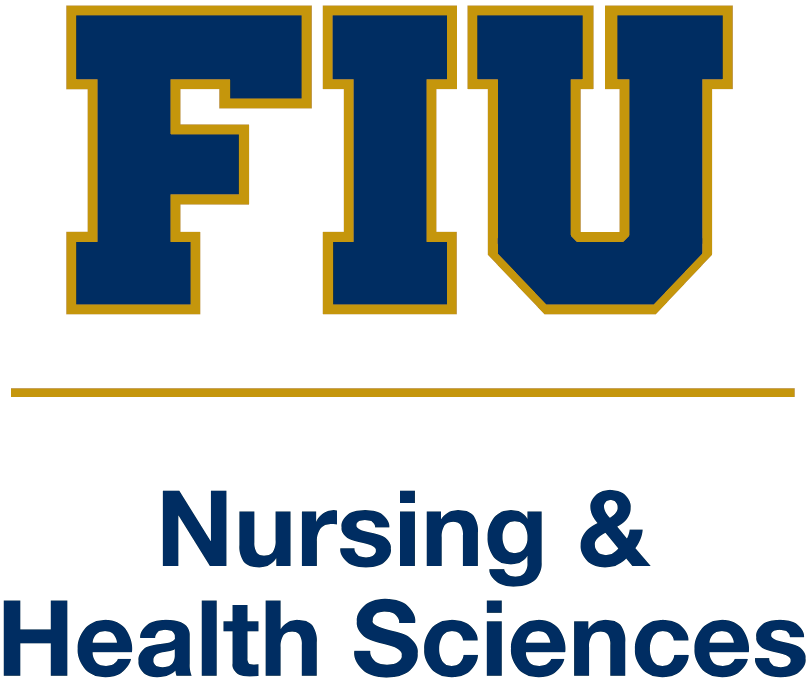
- Type: Public
- Established: 1982
- Dean: Jorge Valdés (Acting)
- Students: 5,450
- Location: Miami, Florida, U.S.
- Website: www.cnhs.fiu.edu

The Nicole Wertheim College of Nursing and Health Sciences (NWCNHS) is the nursing school of Florida International University, located in Miami, Florida, United States.

There are seven programs in the college which include: Nursing, Nurse Anesthetist, Athletic Training, Communication Sciences and Disorders, Health Services Administration, Occupational Therapy, and Physical Therapy

The college received a $10 million donation from Dr. Herbert Wertheim and his wife Nicole on Sept. 25, 2013.

Nicole Wertheim died April 20, 2026 at the age of 82. The president of FIU, Jeanette Nunez wrote about her legacy and many contributions to FIU.

== Undergraduate Nursing ==
The Undergraduate Nursing department at FIU holds five different tracks to obtain a Bachelor of Science in Nursing (BSN) degree. The Generic BSN program is the traditional two-year program for college students. The Accelerated Option is a three semester program for students who already hold a Bachelor's degree in another field and want to change their career to nursing. The RN-to-BSN program is an online program for Licensed Registered Nurses who want to obtain their BSN degree. The Medic to Nurse VBSN program is for medical military veterans who have had prior medical military training and wish to obtain a nursing degree. The Physician Retraining Education Program, FEP to BSN/MSN, is a program for Foreign Physicians who are not practicing medicine in the United States and want to become nurses or nurse practitioners.

== Facilities ==
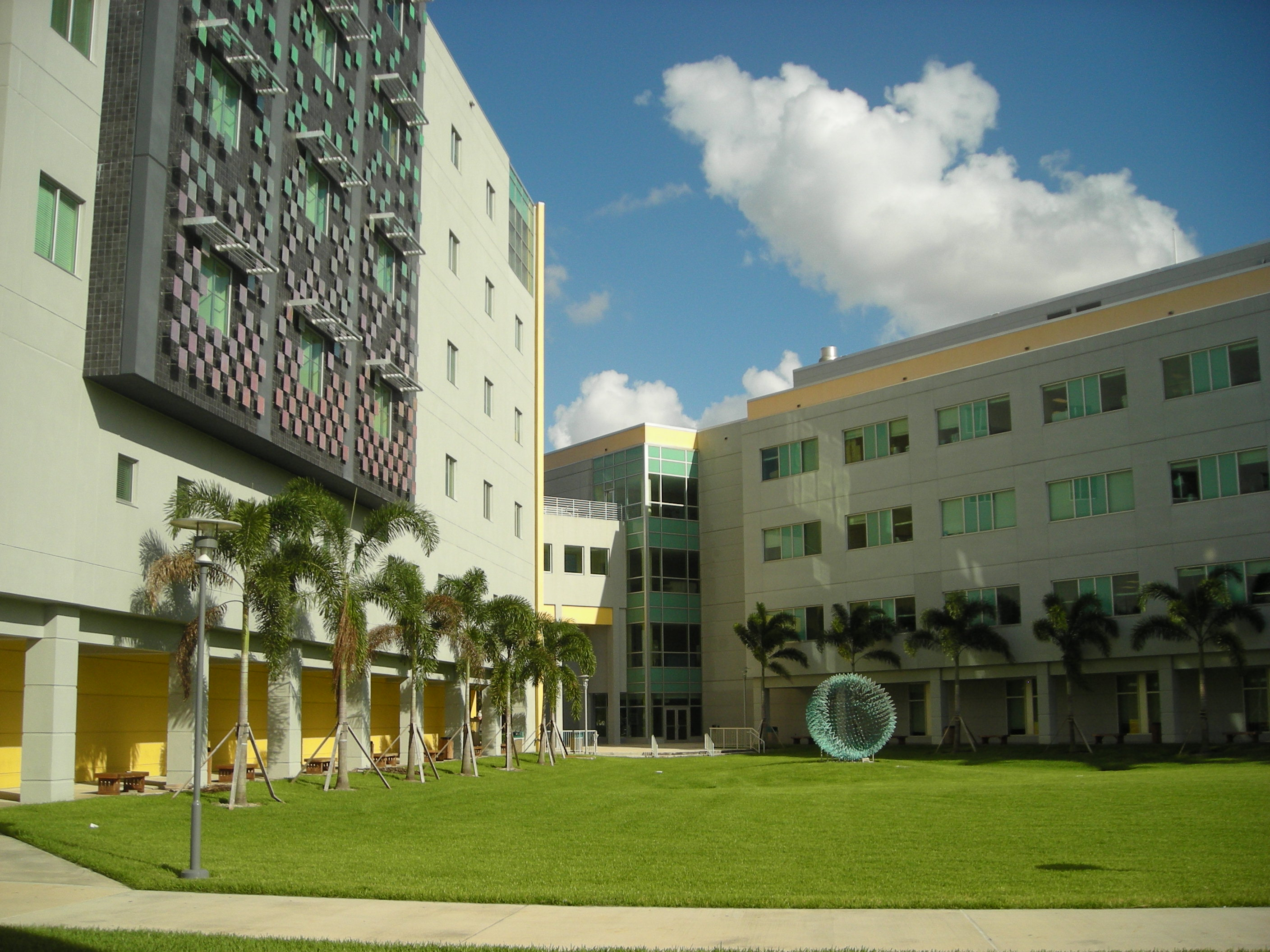
Health and Life Sciences Building I and II house the College of Nursing and Health Sciences.

The College of Nursing and Health Sciences is housed at the Modesto Maidique Campus. In February 2010 the College inaugurated a state-of-the-art building named Academic Health Center 3- College of Nursing and Health Sciences (AHC3). There is a satellite site at the Biscayne Bay Campus in North Miami which holds the Foreign-Education Physician to Nursing program.

== Simulation Teaching and Research Center ==
The Simulation Teaching and Research (STAR) Center provides a real-world experience to healthcare students. It holds state of the art technology such as a prep-scrubbing station, surgical tools, Gaumard Scientific's "Family of Five" patient simulators which include a mother, father, two children and a newborn, and Laerdal SimMan patient simulators which can verbally and physically emit symptoms just like real-world patients. These patient simulators can cry, speak and the expectant mother actually gives birth to her baby. It is the ultimate learning experience for healthcare professionals where they can learn the necessary skills to evolve their communication with patients and their families.

The STAR center has eight simulation patient rooms which act as operating rooms or primary care clinics, a 15-bed critical care unit which has a nurses station and hospital equipment, three control rooms where computerized scenarios are operated, and two debriefing rooms where simulation is reviewed and discussed with students.
