= University of Applied Health Sciences =

University in Zagreb, Croatia

- Former names: Advanced School of Nursing and Health Technicians
- Type: Public
- Established: 1966
- Dean: Igor Filipčić
- Students: 4,000
- Location: Mlinarska Street 38, Zagreb, 100000, Croatia
- Language: Croatian
- Website: www.zvu.hr

The University of Applied Health Sciences (Croatian: Zdravstveno veleučilište u Zagrebu) is a Croatian public higher educational institution focused on nursing and allied health fields. It was established in 1966 and is located in Zagreb, Croatia. The university offers three-year degrees and graduate degrees.

== History ==
The University of Applied Health Sciences was established in Zagreb, Croatia, in 1966 as the Advanced School of Nursing and Health Technicians. It was founded by the Association of Croatian Health Institutions to fill a need or health professionals with a higher level of education. It was the first and only higher education institution in Croatia that provided a degree for hospital and dispensary nurses, as well as radiologic technicians, and environmental health and laboratory technicians. Its curriculum expanded to include physiotherapy in 1968, followed by occupational therapy in 1986.

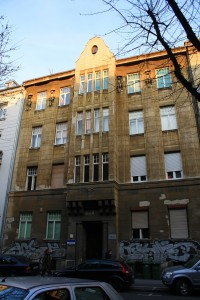
Former location at Gajeva Street 49/1

When it opened, the school did not have a dedicated campus. It rented a space of 20 square metres (220 sq ft) in the Centre for the Protection of Mothers and Children on Klaićeva Street. Classes were held in rented premises throughout Zagreb. The school's faculty were part-time employees, mostly from the Faculty of Medicine, University of Zagreb.

In 1970, the school purchased Gajeva Street 49/1, an area of 140 square metres (1,500 sq ft). Soon afterwards, funds were raised to purchase the attic of a building at Mlinarska Street 38 to provide office space for faculty; this space was occupied in 1986.

In 1984, the government reformed the education system, forcing the Advanced School of Nursing and Health Technicians to merge with the Faculty of Medicine, University of Zagreb, allegedly for the purpose of rationalizing staff, space, and equipment. The merger limited the school's development of academic programs and a dedicated teaching staff, which were then under the control of the various departments of the Faculty of Medicine.

Following the establishment of the new Croatian state, the process reforming higher education began. The Higher Education Act of 1993 started the process of creating new, independent colleges and polytechnics. By a decree of the Government of Croatia on May 17, 1996, the school officially separated from the Faculty of Medicine. On March 18, 2005, the Government of Croatia renamed the institution as the University of Applied Health Sciences.

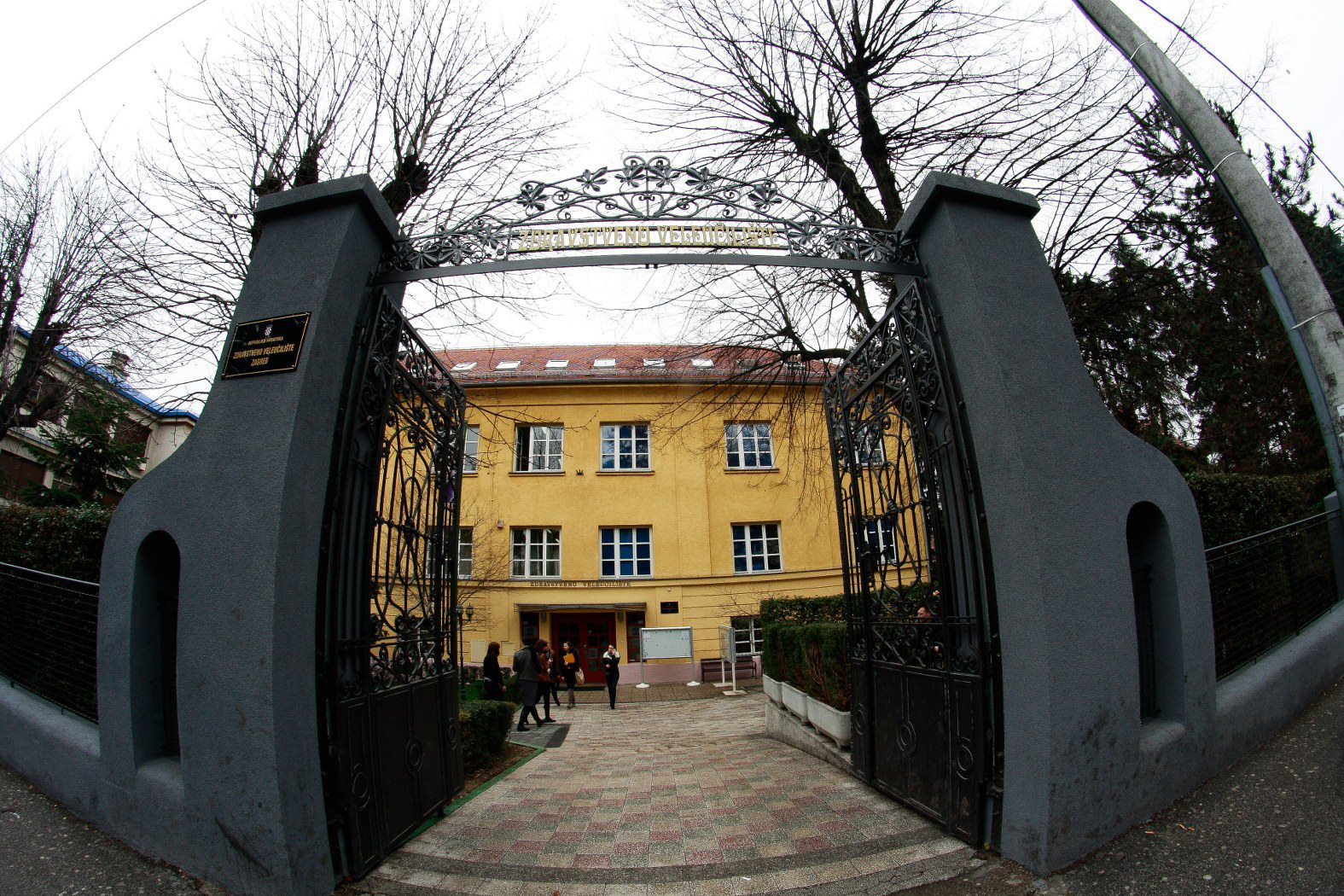
Entrance to the current campus of the University of Applied Health Sciences

== Campus ==
The University of Applied Health Sciences is located in a building at Mlinarska Street 38 in Zagreb. The original building was renovated and expanded in 2002, including a new annex that includes two large halls for theoretical classes and offices for instructors. In 2004, a second annex was added. In 2006, the university expanded its campus to the former Privredna Banka from its premises on Ksaver 209, adding office space for faculty and ten lecture halls,

== Academics ==
The University of Applied Health Sciences was accredited by the Agency for Science and Higher Education in Croatia in 2005.

It offers six three-year professional degrees and six specialist graduate degrees.

Undergraduate professional studies	Specialized graduate professional studies
Physiotherapy	Nursing management
Medical laboratory diagnostics	Public health
Radiological technology	Physiotherapy
Occupational therapy	Environmental health engineering
Environmental health engineering	Clinical nursing
Nursing	Psychiatric nursing

The university has a chapter of Sigma Theta Tau, an international honor society for nursing.

== Students ==
In 2025, the University of Applied Health Sciences had 4,000 students.
