= Harnish =

Harnish is a surname. Notable people with the surname include:

- Chandler Harnish (born 1988), American football quarterback
- Reno L. Harnish (born 1949), American diplomat
- Rick Harnish, American non-profit executive
- Verne Harnish (born 1954), American businessman
