= Frasca (disambiguation) =

Frasca International, Inc. is a manufacturer of flight simulators located in the United States.

Frasca may also refer to:

== People with the surname ==
- Curtis Frasca (born 1968), American entrepreneur, former CEO and co-founder of the company Verse Music Group
- Dominic Frasca (born 1967), American guitarist
- Erminio Frasca (born 1983), Italian sport shooter
- Gabriel Frasca, American chef
- Gonzalo Frasca (born 1972), Uruguayan game designer
- Pauline Frasca (born 1980), Australian two-time world champion rower
- Raffaele Frasca, Italian sports shooter
- Tony Frasca, (1927−1999), American ice hockey player and coach

== Transportation ==
- Frasca Field, airport located in Champaign County, Illinois

== Restaurants ==
- Frasca Food and Wine, Michelin-starred restaurant in Boulder, Colorado
