= Corridor Identification and Development Program =

US federal railroad funding mechanism

The Corridor Identification and Development Program, abbreviated as the Corridor ID Program, is a comprehensive planning program for inter-city passenger rail projects in the United States administered by the Federal Railroad Administration (FRA) under the 2021 Infrastructure Investment and Jobs Act (IIJA). Each route accepted into the program is granted $500,000 toward planning activities and is prioritized for future federal funding.

As of December 2023, a total of 69 passenger rail corridors have been accepted into the Corridor ID Program. Of these, 7 are new high-speed rail routes, 34 are new conventional rail routes, 13 are existing routes with proposed extensions, and 15 are existing routes with proposed upgrades. For example, accepted projects include Brightline West high-speed rail, the Northern Lights Express from Minneapolis to Duluth, the Heartland Flyer extension from Oklahoma City to Newton, and frequency increases for the Cardinal and Sunset Limited.

== History ==
The $1.8 billion Corridor ID Program was authorized by Congress with the passage of the IIJA in November 2021 and was formally established in May 2022. The FRA began soliciting its first round of applications in December 2022 and made its first selection of 69 corridors in December 2023.

== Program ==
The purpose of the Corridor ID Program is to identify potential passenger rail expansion projects and to provide seed funding for planning stages. Construction and operational funding are not included. Eligible entities are invited to submit projects for consideration. Such entities include Amtrak, regional rail authorities, states, groups of state, state subdivisions, regional planning organizations, and federally recognized tribes. Once selected, each corridor is initially granted $500,000 toward project planning activities. Projects proceed through three steps:

- Step 1: Determination of the scope, schedule, and cost estimate for preparing a Service Development Plan
- Step 2: Preparation of the Service Development Plan. This plan must list details including train frequencies, peak and average operating speeds, trip times, station locations, capital projects, rolling stock needs, economic impacts, environmental benefits, and the project schedule. These grants require a 10% match from entities.
- Step 3: Project development work readying the Service Development Plan for implementation, such as environmental impact statements and engineering design. Step 3 awardees must input a 20% match.

== List of corridors ==
This list is current as of December 2023. A total of 69 passenger rail corridors spanning 44 states have been accepted into the Corridor ID Program.

Legend
HSR New high-speed rail
New New conventional rail
Extension Existing route with extension, might include upgrades
Upgrade Existing route with upgrades, no extension

Corridor	Route	Sponsor	Type	Step
Amtrak Texas High-Speed Rail Corridor	Dallas–Houston	Amtrak	HSR	3
Brightline West High-Speed Corridor	Rancho Cucamonga–Las Vegas	Nevada Department of Transportation	HSR	1
California High-Speed Rail Phase 1 Corridor	San Francisco–Los Angeles/Anaheim	California High-Speed Rail Authority	HSR	1
Cascadia High-Speed Ground Transportation	Vancouver–Portland	Washington State Department of Transportation	HSR	2
Charlotte, North Carolina, to Atlanta, Georgia, Corridor	Charlotte–Atlanta	North Carolina Department of Transportation	HSR	1
Fort Worth to Houston High-Speed Rail Corridor	Fort Worth–Houston	North Central Texas Council of Governments	HSR	1
High Desert Corridor	Victor Valley–Palmdale	Antelope Valley Transit Authority	HSR	1
Asheville to Salisbury, North Carolina, Corridor	Asheville–Salisbury	North Carolina Department of Transportation	New	1
Atlanta to Savannah Corridor	Atlanta–Savannah	Georgia Department of Transportation	New	2
Atlanta-Chattanooga-Nashville-Memphis Corridor	Atlanta–Memphis	City of Chattanooga	New	1
Baton Rouge-New Orleans Corridor	Baton Rouge–New Orleans	Louisiana Department of Transportation and Development	New	1
Boston and Albany Corridor	Boston–Albany	Massachusetts Department of Transportation	New	2
Central Coast Corridor	San Jose–San Luis Obispo	California Department of Transportation	New	1
Charlotte to Kings Mountain, North Carolina, Corridor	Charlotte–Kings Mountain	North Carolina Department of Transportation	New	1
Chicago to Quad Cities Service Extension Program	Chicago–Moline	Illinois Department of Transportation	New	1
Chicago, Fort Wayne, Columbus, and Pittsburgh	Chicago–Pittsburgh	City of Fort Wayne	New	1
Cleveland-Columbus-Dayton-Cincinnati (3C&D) Corridor	Cleveland–Cincinnati	Ohio Rail Development Commission	New	1
Cleveland-Toledo-Detroit Corridor	Cleveland–Detroit	Ohio Rail Development Commission	New	1
Coachella Valley Rail Corridor	Los Angeles–Coachella	California Department of Transportation	New	1
Colorado Front Range Corridor	Fort Collins–Pueblo	Front Range Passenger Rail District	New	2
Commonwealth Corridor	Newport News–New River Valley	Virginia Department of Rail and Public Transportation	New	1
Diamond State Line	Newark/Wilmington–Salisbury/Berlin	Delaware Transit Corporation	New	1
Eau Claire-Twin Cities Corridor	St. Paul–Eau Claire	Eau Claire County, Wisconsin	New	1
Fayetteville to Raleigh, North Carolina, Corridor	Fayetteville–Raleigh	North Carolina Department of Transportation	New	1
Gulf Coast Passenger Rail Service	New Orleans–Mobile	Southern Rail Commission	New	1
Houston to San Antonio Corridor	Houston–San Antonio	Texas Department of Transportation	New	1
I-20 Corridor Intercity Passenger Rail Service	Dallas–Meridian	Southern Rail Commission	New	1
Jacksonville-Orlando-Miami Corridor	Jacksonville–Miami	Florida Department of Transportation	New	1
Louisville-Indianapolis Passenger Rail Corridor	Indianapolis–Louisville	Kentuckiana Regional Planning and Development Agency	New	1
Miami-Orlando-Tampa Corridor	Miami–Tampa	Florida Department of Transportation	New	1
Milwaukee-Madison-Eau Claire-Twin Cities Corridor	Milwaukee–Minneapolis	Wisconsin Department of Transportation	New	1
North Coast Hiawatha	Chicago–Seattle/Portland	Big Sky Passenger Rail Authority	New	1
Northern Lights Express	Minneapolis–Duluth	Minnesota Department of Transportation	New	1
Peoria to Chicago Passenger Rail Service	Peoria–Chicago	City of Peoria	New	1
Phoenix-Tucson Corridor	Buckeye–Tucson	Arizona Department of Transportation	New	1
Reading-Philadelphia-New York Corridor	Reading–New York City	Schuylkill River Passenger Rail Authority	New	1
Scranton to New York Penn Station Corridor	Scranton–New York City	Pennsylvania Department of Transportation	New	2
Texas Triangle: Dallas-Fort Worth-Houston Intercity Passenger Rail Corridor	Fort Worth–Houston	Texas Department of Transportation	New	1
TCMC Service Expansion via La Crosse	Chicago–St. Paul	Wisconsin Department of Transportation	New	1
Wilmington to Raleigh, North Carolina, Corridor	Wilmington–Raleigh	North Carolina Department of Transportation	New	1
Winston-Salem to Raleigh, North Carolina, Corridor	Winston-Salem–Raleigh	North Carolina Department of Transportation	New	1
Amtrak to Long Island	Washington–New York City–Ronkonkoma	Amtrak	Extension	2
Capitol Corridor	Extensions to San Francisco, Salinas, Novato, Sparks	California Department of Transportation	Extension	1
Downeaster Corridor	Boston–Brunswick–Rockland	Northern New England Passenger Rail Authority	Extension	2
Green Mountain Corridor	New York City–Bennington–Burlington	Vermont Agency of Transportation	Extension	1
Hannibal Extension of Existing Chicago-Quincy Corridor	Chicago–Quincy–Hannibal	Missouri Department of Transportation	Extension	1
Heartland Flyer Extension	Fort Worth–Oklahoma City–Newton	Kansas Department of Transportation	Extension	1
Kansas City, MO, to St Joseph, MO	St. Louis–Kansas City–St. Joseph	Missouri Department of Transportation	Extension	1
Los Angeles-San Diego-San Luis Obispo (LOSSAN) Rail Corridor	San Luis Obispo–San Diego–San Ysidro	California Department of Transportation	Extension	1
Milwaukee to Green Bay (Hiawatha Extension)	Chicago–Milwaukee–Green Bay	Wisconsin Department of Transportation	Extension	1
San Joaquin Valley Corridor	Merced/Oakland–Sacramento–Redding	California Department of Transportation	Extension	1
Vermonter Corridor	Washington–St. Albans–Montreal	Vermont Agency of Transportation	Extension	1
Washington, D.C., to Bristol, VA, Corridor	Washington–Roanoke–Bristol	Virginia Department of Rail and Public Transportation	Extension	1
Wolverine Corridor	Chicago–Detroit–Windsor	Michigan Department of Transportation	Extension	1
Adirondack Corridor	New York City–Montreal	New York State Department of Transportation	Upgrade	1
Amtrak Cascades Corridor	Eugene–Vancouver	Washington State Department of Transportation	Upgrade	1
Anchorage North & South Corridor	Fairbanks–Seward	Alaska Railroad Corporation	Upgrade	1
Charlotte, North Carolina, to Washington, D.C., Corridor	Charlotte–Washington	North Carolina Department of Transportation	Upgrade	1
Chicago to Carbondale Corridor	Chicago–Carbondale	Illinois Department of Transportation	Upgrade	1
Chicago to Grand Rapids Corridor	Chicago–Grand Rapids	Michigan Department of Transportation	Upgrade	1
Chicago to Port Huron Corridor	Chicago–Port Huron	Michigan Department of Transportation	Upgrade	1
Chicago to St. Louis Higher-Speed Rail Corridor	Chicago–St. Louis	Illinois Department of Transportation	Upgrade	1
Daily Cardinal Service	New York City–Chicago	Amtrak	Upgrade	1
Daily Sunset Limited Service	New Orleans–Los Angeles	Amtrak	Upgrade	1
Empire Corridor	New York City–Niagara Falls	New York State Department of Transportation	Upgrade	1
Hartford Line Corridor	New Haven–Springfield	Connecticut Department of Transportation	Upgrade	1
Indianapolis-Chicago Corridor	Indianapolis–Chicago	Indiana Department of Transportation	Upgrade	1
Keystone Corridor: Pittsburgh to Philadelphia	Philadelphia–Pittsburgh	Pennsylvania Department of Transportation	Upgrade	1
Milwaukee to Chicago Hiawatha Expansion	Milwaukee–Chicago	Wisconsin Department of Transportation	Upgrade	1
