= American High-Speed Rail Act =

- Long title: To amend chapter 261 of title 49, United States Code, to provide for high-speed rail corridor development, and for other purposes.

Legislative history
- Introduced in the House of Representatives as H.R. 7600 by Seth Moulton (D‑MA) and Suzan DelBene (D‑WA) on March 8, 2024; Committee consideration by House Committee on Transportation and Infrastructure

The American High-Speed Rail Act is a legislative proposal introduced in the United States Congress aimed at accelerating the development and deployment of high-speed rail (HSR) and higher-speed rail projects across the country. The bill was introduced in March 2024 by Representative Seth Moulton (D‑MA) and Representative Suzan DelBene (D‑WA), reflecting a renewed federal commitment to modernizing American rail infrastructure and promoting sustainable transportation.

== Provisions ==
The American High-Speed Rail Act proposes an investment of $205 billion over five years to support the construction and enhancement of high-speed and higher-speed rail corridors throughout the United States. The funding would be allocated through existing Federal Railroad Administration (FRA) programs, including the Federal-State Partnership for Intercity Rail, Consolidated Rail Infrastructure and Safety Improvements (CRISI), and Amtrak, with modifications to prioritize electrification and speed improvements

The Act would also establish two new programs:

- State Rail Formula Funding: To support the development of state rail plans, operations, and expansion and maintenance of rail infrastructure.
- Green Railroads Fund: To enable or improve electrified rail operations, supporting the transition to cleaner energy sources.

== Objectives ==
The primary objectives of the Act include:

- Establishing a coordinated federal railway program to plan, fund, and oversee a nationwide network of high-speed and higher-speed trains.
- Accelerating the construction of at least one operational high-speed rail line in the United States within the decade.
- Supporting electrification, reducing carbon emissions, and providing a competitive alternative to highway and air travel for intercity transportation.

== Legislative history ==
The American High-Speed Rail Act was introduced in the 118th Congress (2023–2024) and has been supported by transportation advocates, environmental groups, and several members of Congress who see high-speed rail as a critical component for meeting future travel demand and climate goals. The proposal builds on momentum from the 2021 Bipartisan Infrastructure Law, which created the Corridor Identification and Development Program to fund planning for new and improved rail corridors nationwide

== Impact and reception ==
Supporters of the Act argue that high-speed rail would provide significant economic benefits, create jobs, reduce greenhouse gas emissions, and offer a cost-effective alternative to expanding airports and highways. Moulton has emphasized that the cost of building high-speed rail is "cheaper than building the airports and highway expansions you would need to meet 2050 travel demand if you didn’t have high-speed rail"

Critics have raised concerns about the high upfront costs, the challenges of land acquisition, and the complexities of integrating new rail lines with existing infrastructure.

== See also ==
- High-speed rail in the United States
