= Dowling College =

Private college in Oakdale, New York, US (1968–2016)

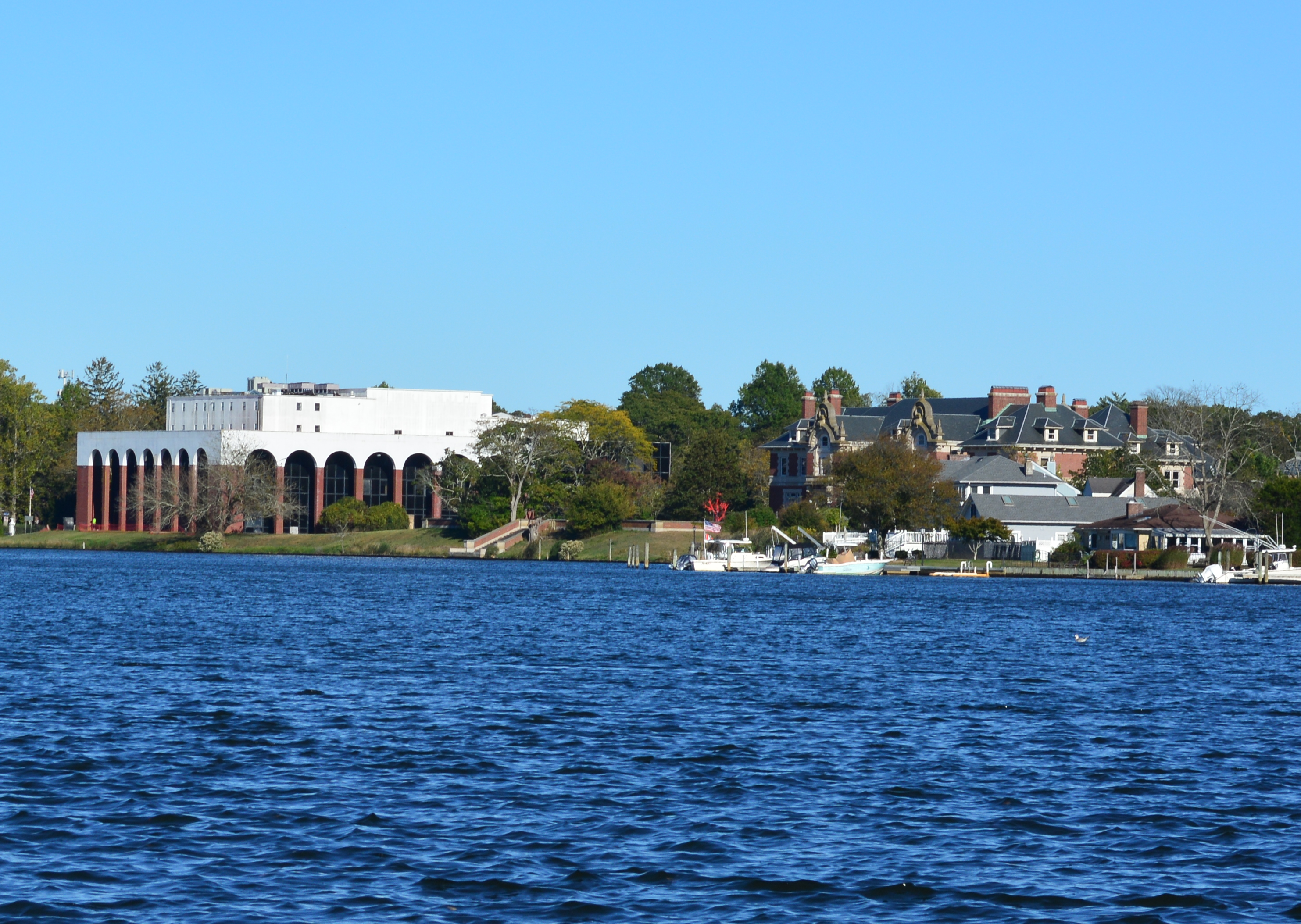
- The former Oakdale Campus, photographed in 2025
- Former name: Adelphi Suffolk
- Motto: Learning, Wisdom, Compassion
- Type: Private college
- Active: September 27, 1968–August 31, 2016
- Location: Oakdale, New York, United States; 40.742°N 73.148°W
- Campus: Suburban
- Colors: Blue and gold
- Nickname: The Golden Lions
- Sporting affiliations: NCAA Division II - East Coast Conference
- Mascot: Rory

Dowling College was a private college on Long Island, New York. It was established in 1968 and had its main campus located in Oakdale, New York on the site of William K. Vanderbilt's mansion Idle Hour. Dowling also included a campus in Shirley, which contained the college's aviation program and athletic complexes, and small campuses in Melville and Manhattan.

Dowling was composed of four schools: the School of Arts & Sciences, the School of Education, the Townsend School of Business, and the School of Aviation. Largely enrolling local Long Island students, the college offered a variety of bachelor's degree programs in the arts, sciences, and business, master's degree programs in education and business, and a doctorate in education.

After years of financial difficulties, frequently changing leadership, declining enrollment, and a failed search to find an academic partner, Dowling's accreditation was revoked by the Middle States Commission on Higher Education, and the college ceased operations on August 31, 2016.

== History ==
=== Idle Hour ===
Idle Hour was a 900-acre (3.6 km^{2}) estate on the Connetquot River built in 1882 by William K. Vanderbilt. The wooden 110-room home was destroyed by fire on April 15, 1899, while his son, William Kissam Vanderbilt II, was honeymooning there. Willie and his new wife escaped. It was rebuilt of red brick and gray stone, with exquisite furnishings, for $3 million. His daughter Consuelo also honeymooned there when she married the Duke of Marlborough in 1895.

After Vanderbilt's death in 1920, the mansion went through several phases and visitors, including a brief stay during Prohibition by gangster Dutch Schultz. Around that time, cow stalls, pig pens and corn cribs on the farm portion of Idle Hour were converted into a short-lived bohemian artists' colony that included figures such as George Elmer Browne and Roman Bonet-Sintas.

In 1963, the estate became home to Dowling College until it closed in August 2016.

=== Founding ===
In 1955, Adelphi College began offering extension classes in Port Jefferson, Riverhead, and Sayville, New York. In 1959, Adelphi Suffolk became the first four-year, degree-granting liberal arts institution in Suffolk County, housed in an old public school building in Sayville. In January 1963, Adelphi purchased the former William K. Vanderbilt estate in Oakdale. Adelphi spun the campus off in 1968 as Dowling College, named after city planner and philanthropist Robert W. Dowling, who provided an endowment of over $3 million.

=== Operation ===
The Racanelli Learning Resource Center was constructed in 1974 to house the library, cafeteria and additional classrooms. A month later, a fire damaged the Vanderbilt mansion. The Hunt Room, the Foyer and Ballroom were all substantially damaged. A College committee, led by Alan Fortunoff, Dowling Trustee and son of Fortunoff founder Max Fortunoff, guided the restoration of the ornate woodwork, precious marble, and the elaborately carved stonework. The mansion was renamed to Fortunoff Hall to honor Paul and Emily Fortunoff.

Dr. Victor P. Meskill served as president of Dowling from 1977 until he was forced to step down in 2000. Meskill attempted to shift the focus of the college from a small, locally focused institution to a global university, with an emphasis on the aviation focused Brookhaven Campus which opened in October 1994. A shakeup occurred in June 1999 when Meskill fired five top-ranking college officials on the same day as a cost-cutting measure, after Dowling's debt had increased to $34 million and the school's credit rating had been downgraded. Meskill was one of the most highly compensated college presidents in the country. Months later, Meskill was forced to step down by trustees and the officials he fired were reinstated.

Former Suffolk County Executive Robert Gaffney was made president in October 2006. Gaffney resigned in May 2010, then later in 2014 the college paid Gaffney over $400,000 in a settlement. In August 2013, the Brookhaven Campus dormitory, bookstore, and cafeteria were closed due to the college's financial struggles. However, these facilities reopened in September 2014 following a deal with Stony Brook University which allowed Dowling students to live in the dormitory alongside Stony Brook students.

After Gaffney stepped down in 2010, Dowling College went through a series of six interim leaders in five years, including Board Chairman Scott Rudolph, provost Elana Zolfo, Jeremy Brown, and interim President Norman Smith. The last of which was Albert Inserra, who became president in the fall of 2014. As of 2016, the college enrolled 2,256 total students, down from a high of 6,746 in 1999. Dowling College was approximately $54 million in debt with an endowment of under $2 million, its credit rating was "Ca", and it was in default on bond payments.

=== Closure ===
Dowling College was accredited by the Middle States Commission on Higher Education. In November 2015, Middle States required Dowling to show cause as to why the school's accreditation should not be revoked due to the college's finances, a final warning before such action would be taken. In March 2016 Dowling announced that they had secured a partnership with Global University Systems, allowing the college to continue operating. On May 23, five days before the Class of 2016's graduation ceremony, the agreement with Global University Systems stalled and Dowling needed an emergency infusion of cash to survive until graduation.

In a total surprise to many students, faculty, and staff, on May 31 Dowling announced that the school would be closing in three days. Nearly all employees were laid off. The closing date was later pushed back to June 8. On that day, president Albert Inserra announced that negotiations had restarted and the motion to close the school was rescinded. A teach-out plan, required by Middle States, to help students transition to other institutions, was put into effect in partnership with Molloy College. However, since Dowling remained open, the teach-out plan was canceled and students were left on their own. On July 13, the board of trustees announced that they had failed to reach an agreement with Global University Systems, and the college would close on August 31, when Middle States would revoke its accreditation. Dowling College granted its last degrees and closed on August 31, then filed for bankruptcy protection on November 29, 2016. The mansion and grounds have faced extreme vandalism since its closure.

Long Island University has taken over as successor custodian of Dowling College's transcript records.

== Campus ==
=== Rudolph Campus ===
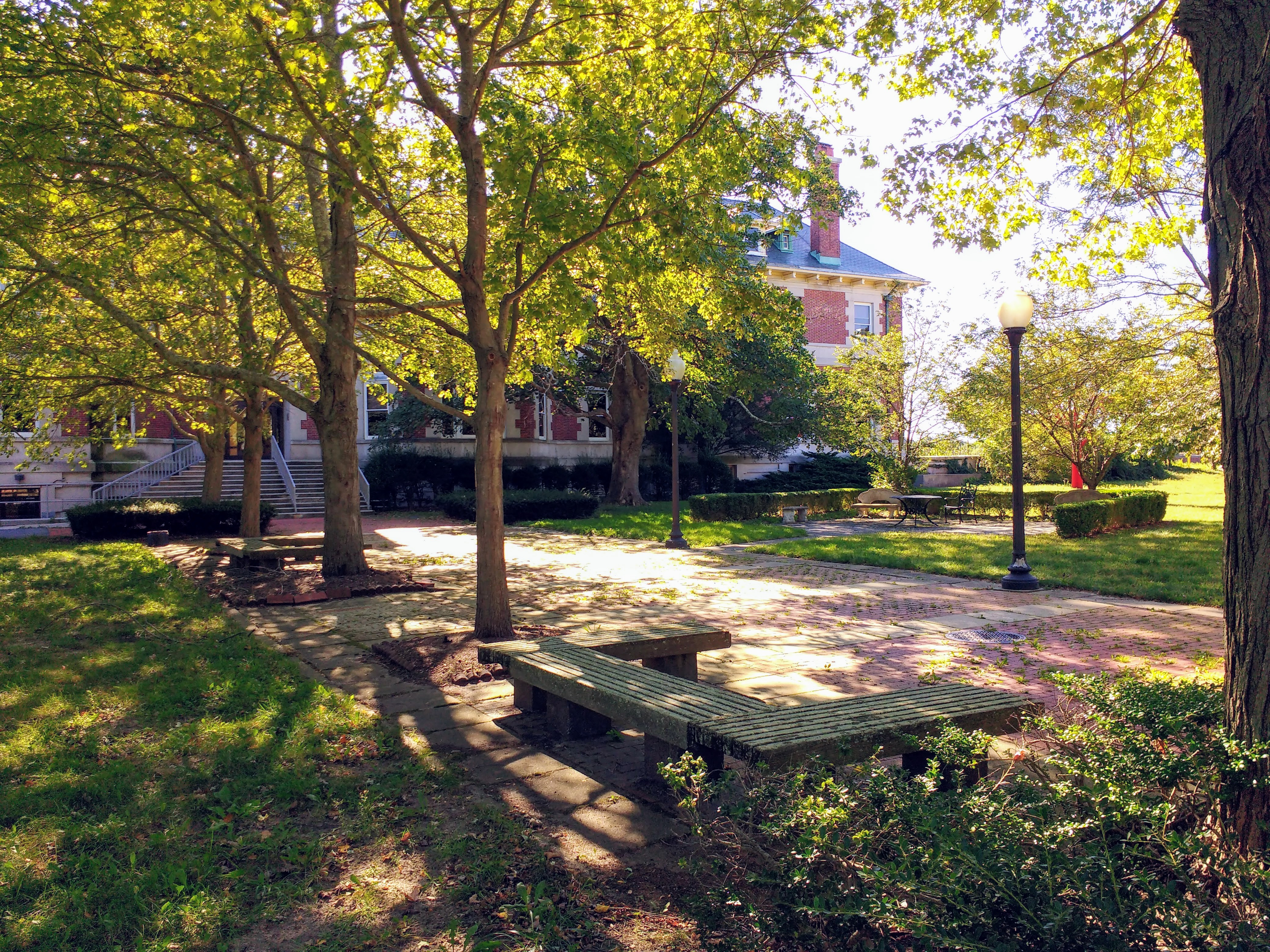
Rudolph Campus, with Fortunoff Hall in background

Located about 50 miles east of Manhattan in Oakdale, New York, the Rudolph Campus was the original and primary campus of Dowling College. The campus sat along the Connetquot River, where Dowling's rowing team practiced and competed. The former Vanderbilt Mansion was divided into two buildings: Fortunoff Hall, which housed administration and hosted college events, and the Kramer Science Center, which contained the school's laboratory classrooms and where science, mathematics, and computer science classes were held. The other large building on campus was the Racanelli Learning Resource Center, where the school's library, cafeteria, and many classrooms were located, including the School of Business on the top floor.

Other buildings housed classrooms for education, music, and theater classes, including a small theater space in the Music and Arts building. Art created by students and local artists was displayed in the Anthony Giordano Gallery. The Oakdale Residence Hall accommodated up to 207 undergraduate students, with a study lounge available to all residents 24 hours a day. Adjacent to the Residence Hall was the Curtin Student Center, which contained the campus gym. Upstairs was the Lion's Den, a place for students to unwind and socialize.

=== Brookhaven Campus ===
Established in October 1994, The Brookhaven Campus was located on William Floyd Parkway in Shirley, New York. Dowling's aviation program was located there, making use of the Brookhaven Calabro Airport. The campus also was the site of Dowling's sports complex, featuring a multi-purpose stadium, baseball and softball fields. It included a 289-bed dormitory, computer labs, a cafeteria, bookstore, and library.

=== Melville Center ===
Dowling's Melville Center, in Melville, New York, housed administrative offices for the Dowling Institute, as well as classrooms where select undergraduate and graduate courses were offered, a library, and a conference room.

=== Dowling College Manhattan ===
Dowling College Manhattan was located in the Standard Oil Building in the Financial District. It offered programs for international students, such as an internship-based MBA, a first-year American college experience, and courses in international Studies, global Marketing and philosophy.

== Academics ==
Dowling College consisted of four schools:

=== School of Arts and Sciences ===
The School of Arts of Sciences had three divisions: Arts & Humanities, Social Sciences, and Natural Sciences & Mathematics. The School of Arts and Sciences offered a variety of Bachelor of Arts and Bachelor of Science degrees, along with a Master of Arts degree in Liberal Studies and Integrated Mathematics and Science Education.

=== School of Aviation ===
The School of Aviation offered Bachelor of Science degrees in Aerospace Systems Technology, Aviation Management, and participated in the FAA Air Traffic Control Collegiate Training Initiative (AT-CTI) program, which is the primary source for hiring air traffic controllers. The School of Aviation maintained a fleet of aircraft which included nine Piper Warriors, an Arrow, and a twin engine Seminole. A Virtual Airport Operations System, built with a 5 million-dollar grant from NASA, and Three Frasca flight simulators were located at the Brookhaven campus on the grounds of the Brookhaven Calabro Airport. Students could obtain training necessary for Federal Aviation Administration (FAA) Private and Commercial certificates, the Instrument and Multi-Engine ratings, the Certified Flight Instructor (CFI) certificate and CFI Instrument and CFI Multi-Engine ratings.

=== Townsend School of Business ===
The School of Business offered Bachelor of Business Administration degrees in Accounting, Finance, Management and Leadership and Marketing, as well as Bachelor of Science in Computer Information Systems and Sport Management. At the graduate level, Master of Business Administration degrees were offered in Aviation Management, Management and Leadership, Healthcare Management, Corporate Finance, and Public Management. Also, Dowling College and Touro Law Center partnered to offer a dual J.D./M.B.A. degree. The Townsend School of Business was accredited by the International Assembly for Collegiate Business Education (IACBE).

=== School of Education ===
Dowling's School of Education offered Bachelor of Arts degrees in Elementary Education and Early Childhood Education and Bachelor of Science degrees in Physical Education, Special Education and Sports Management. Master of Science and Doctor of Educational Administration degrees were offered for graduate students. Approximately 5,000 teachers and administrators on Long Island received their teaching certification through Dowling College. The School of Education was accredited by The National Council for Accreditation of Teacher Education (NCATE).

== Athletics ==
The Dowling athletics teams were called the Golden Lions. The college was a member of the Division II level of the National Collegiate Athletic Association (NCAA), primarily competing in the East Coast Conference (ECC; formerly known as the New York Collegiate Athletic Conference (NYCAC) until after the 2005–06 school year) from 1989–90 to 2015–16 for all sports (with the exception of men's golf and field hockey, which competed as independents).

Dowling competed in 15 intercollegiate varsity sports: Men's sports included baseball, basketball, cross country, golf, lacrosse, soccer and tennis; while women's sports included basketball, cross country, field hockey, lacrosse, soccer, softball, sailing, tennis and volleyball. The school also offered cheerleading as a club sport.

=== Accomplishments ===
The Golden Lions were the NCAA National Champions in men's soccer in 2006 and men's lacrosse in 2012.

== Notable alumni ==
- Thomas S. Bianchi, distinguished professor at University of Florida, oceanographer
- Will Brown, head men's basketball coach, SUNY Albany
- Corey Glover, lead singer of Living Colour and actor
- Mark Mathabane, South African writer and human rights activist
- Bill McDermott, CEO of ServiceNow
- Goran Nedeljkovic, former rower and Olympian (Athens, Greece, 2004) world champion, Dad Vail champion (2002) in the eight, member of Balkan Express eight, born in 1982
- Boban Rankovic, former rower and Olympian (Sydney, Australia, 2000), world champion, Dad Vail champion (2002) in the eight, member of Balkan Express eight, born in 1979
- Scott Rudolph, entrepreneur and founder of Piping Rock Health Products; former CEO and president of Nature's Bounty, Inc.
- Ben Sliney, former FAA National operations manager responsible for grounding all U.S. air traffic on September 11, 2001

== See also ==
- List of defunct colleges and universities in New York
