= Makarem Sobhi Batterjee =

Saudi businessman

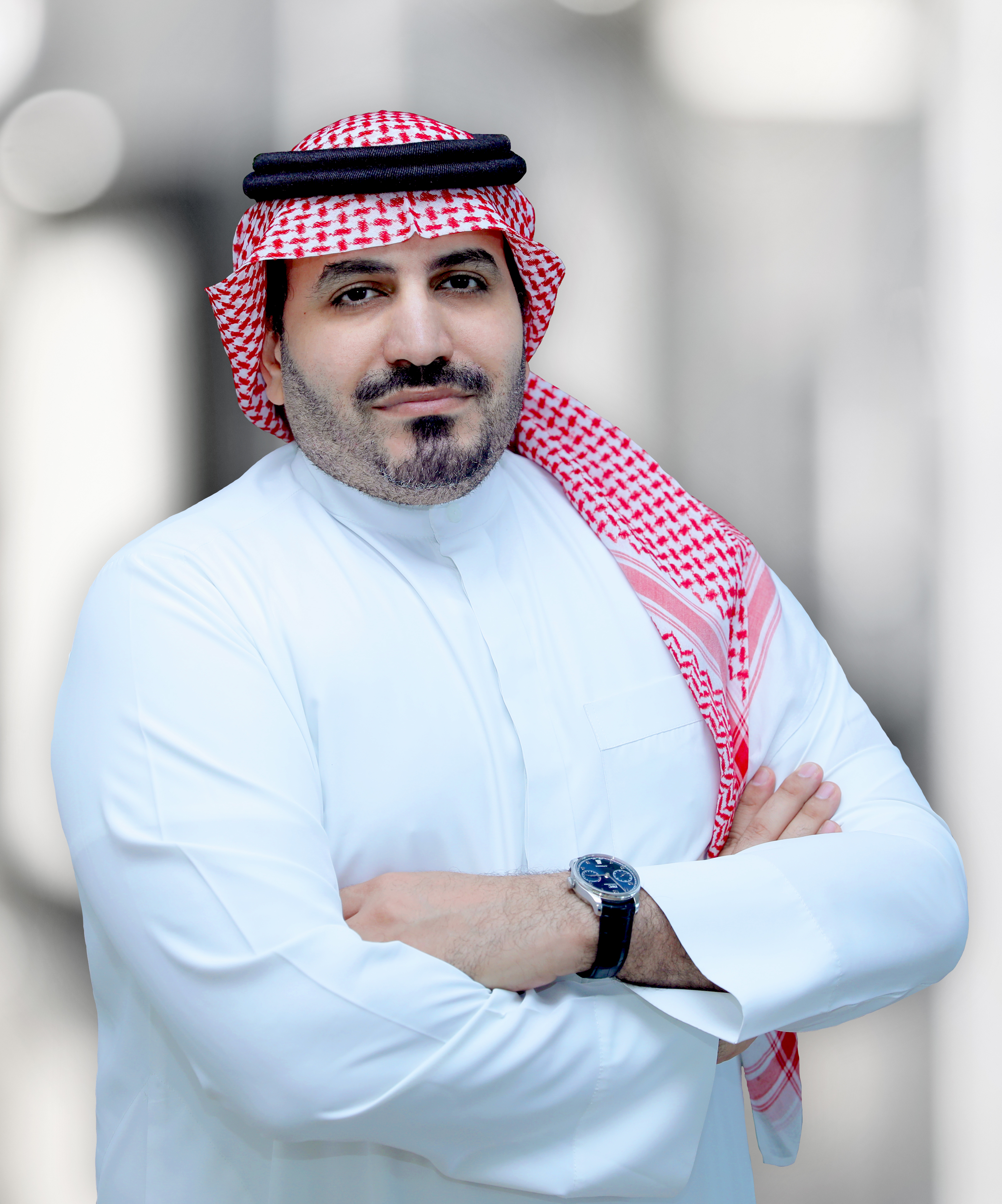
- Born: 1977 (age 48–49); Kingdom of Saudi Arabia
- Education: London Business School
- Occupation: President of Saudi German Hospitals (SGH) Group
- Parent: Eng. Sobhi Batterjee

Makarem Sobhi Batterjee (Arabic: مكارم صبحي بترجي) is a Saudi business leader, investor and entrepreneur. He is the President of Saudi German Hospitals (SGH) Group, one of the largest private hospital networks in the MENA region. He also serves as the Vice President of Middle East Healthcare Company Limited (MEAHCO).

== Education ==
Batterjee holds an MBA from London Business School.

== Career ==
Batterjee currently serves as the President of Saudi German Hospitals Group. He also holds the position of president at the family-owned Bait Al Batterjee Holding Company, a diversified organization with investments in 25 subsidiaries and more than 12500 employees. Additionally, he is the founder and CEO of the New City Company.

Batterjee is the founder and chief executive officer of Shababco Enterprises, which has established the largest award-winning gym, Gold's Gym, in Saudi Arabia. He is also the founder of Humania Capital (2005 – Present), a healthcare investment company, owner of JanPro, a commercial cleaning brand, and the founding president of the Saudi Chapter of the Entrepreneurs' Organization.

Batterjee is a health and wellness advocate as well as a supporter of women empowerment initiatives. On July 7, 2011, he received an honorary doctorate from the United Nations for opening the first women-only fitness centre in Saudi Arabia.

== Awards ==
Batterjee was chosen as a Young Global Leader by the World Economic Forum in Davos in 2008. In the same year, he was selected as the Middle East Young Entrepreneur of the Year by the Dubai Chamber of Commerce and Industry.

Batterjee received the Randi Carrol Award for the establishment of the Saudi chapter of global Entrepreneurs' Organization and was named a Young Arab Leader by the ruler of Dubai, Sheikh Mohammed bin Rashid Al Maktoum

In August 2018, Gold's Gym awarded Batterjee the Gold's Gym Vision Award duringss its convention that was held in Las Vegas.

In 2009, Batterjee became the youngest member and one of the few Arab members to serve on the Bretton Woods Committee.

== TV Appearance ==
Batterjee has appeared as an investor on the Arab version of the US-based reality TV show Shark Tank program since its launch in 2017.
