= HWV (disambiguation) =

HWV may refer to:

- Händel-Werke-Verzeichnis, a catalogue of the works of composer George Frideric Handel
- Brookhaven Airport, in New York, United States
- Heathrow Terminal 5 station, in London
- highest weight vector in representation theory
