= Joseph Raffaele =

Joseph Raffaele was the founder of the American Orthodox Catholic Church - Western Rite Mission, Diocese of New York.

He was initially a layman in the Roman Catholic Church. On August 28, 1973, he founded St. Gregory's Church in Sayville, New York. Three months later, he was ordained to the priesthood by Robert R. Zaborowski, of the Archdiocese of the American Orthodox Catholic Church in the U.S. and Canada, later known as the Mariative Old Catholic Church. Raffaele's congregation drew a number of Catholic traditionalists who felt separated from the post-Vatican II Roman Catholic Church.

The parish of St. Gregory's grew slowly, while Raffaele and his assistants, following the pattern of Old Catholic churches, continued to work at other jobs and spent their remaining time on the church. The parish would around this time move from Sayville to Shirley and later Ronkonkoma, New York.

In the mid-1970s, Zaborowski declared that the churches in his jurisdiction would be obliged to follow the religious traditions of the Polish Roman Catholic church. Raffaele would not agree to do so, and he and the parish left the church, to be excommunicated from it by Zaborowski shortly thereafter.

Raffaele and his church joined the Mount Athos Synod under Bishop Charles C. McCarthy, of the American Orthodox Catholic Church of Archbishop Patrick J. Healy. In 1976, McCarthy consecrated Raffaele a bishop, and at the same time made Raffaele associate, Gerard J. Kessler, a monsignor. Six months after being made a bishop, Raffaele and his church left the Mount Athos Synod, and formed the American Orthodox Catholic Church - Western Rite Mission, Diocese of New York.
