= Chicago Hub Network =

Proposed rail lines in the Midwestern US

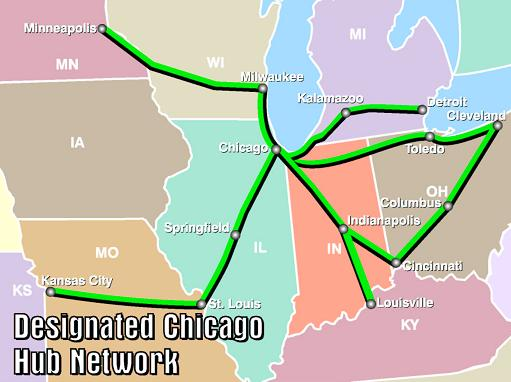
Chicago Hub Network high-speed rail corridors, as designated by the Federal Railroad Administration

The Chicago Hub Network is a collection of proposed fast conventional and high-speed rail lines in the Midwestern United States including 3,000 miles (5,000 km) of track. Since the 1990s, there have been multiple proposals to build a network from Chicago to destinations such as Milwaukee, Madison, Minneapolis, Indianapolis, Detroit, Kansas City, St. Louis, Cleveland, Cincinnati, and Louisville. In addition, the rail lines from the Chicago hub would connect through to cities in Canada. Eastern routes from Chicago would also blend into the Ohio Hub network. In addition to providing better connections between Midwestern cities, the projects are intended to reduce or eliminate the operating subsidies that American passenger train routes currently require.

Midwest High Speed Rail logo

If implemented, the plans would have some of the nation's fastest trains in Chicago, as it had in the 1930s and 1940s when the Twin Zephyrs, Twin Cities 400, and Hiawatha were based in the city. Chicago is North America's largest rail hub, and remains unsurpassed in the total number of passenger and freight trains that converge on any city on the continent. Chicago is a major hub for Amtrak, with 15 different lines terminating at the city's Union Station. Most existing passenger trains in the region operate at speeds of about 55 to 79 miles per hour (89 to 127 km/h), although a few travel faster. The various plans have suggested speeds ranging from 110 to 220 miles per hour (180 to 350 km/h) for the core routes, as well as improved speeds for secondary routes.

In 2023, the Chicago–St. Louis rail line was upgraded so passenger trains are able to reach top speeds of 110 miles per hour (180 km/h) when traveling between Joliet and Alton.

== Early studies and ISTEA corridors ==
Renewed interest in high-speed rail occurred by the year 1990 when the Minnesota–Wisconsin–Illinois Tri-State Rail Study was underway. A Chicago–Milwaukee–Madison–La Crosse–Rochester–Twin Cities "southern corridor" (a variation of the former Hiawatha routing) and a Chicago–Milwaukee–Green Bay–Wausau–Eau Claire–Twin Cities "northern corridor" were described in a preliminary report in December of that year. A final report was released in May 1991 and recommended TGV-class 185 mph (298 km/h) service since it provided the greatest benefit to riders and others in the corridor, though a slower (and less expensive) 125 mph (201 km/h) "Amtrak upgrade" option was also deemed reasonable for capital-constrained investments.

The Intermodal Surface Transportation Efficiency Act of 1991 (ISTEA) was passed on December 18, 1991, and requested designation of up to five corridors. A core of what would become the Chicago Hub Network was the first of these five to be announced by Secretary of Transportation Andrew Card on October 15, 1992, who designated Chicago-based routes to Milwaukee, St. Louis, and Detroit.

== Midwest Regional Rail Initiative ==
In 2004, the Midwest Regional Rail Initiative plan was released, focusing on upgrading existing Amtrak routes. The plan had been in development since 1996, led by the Wisconsin Department of Transportation. Trains would travel at about 110 miles per hour (180 km/h) on the primary routes, but 80 to 90 mph (130 to 140 km/h) on secondary lines. Existing trains run at speeds of about 55 to 79 mph (89 to 127 km/h). Raising the speed would significantly reduce trip times. A trip between Milwaukee and Chicago would be reduced from about 90 minutes to just over an hour. The trip from the Twin Cities to Chicago would drop from 8 hours to 5½ hours. Travelers between Chicago and Cincinnati would see the biggest gains, cutting travel time in half to just 4 hours.

If implemented, planners would expect 13.6 million annual riders by the year 2025. The frequency of train trips would also be increased: areas that currently only see one train in each direction every day would be upgraded to four or six trips each way.

The total investment required for the system, paying for infrastructure as well as rolling stock, was estimated at $7.7 billion in 2002 dollars. $1.1 billion of that would go toward purchasing 63 new train sets. Plans at the time called for phased construction taking about a decade.

This plan is expected to use diesel-powered trains, which is one reason for the relatively low top speed in comparison to high-speed lines in Europe and elsewhere. The practical limit for diesel-powered train service is about 125 mph (201 km/h). Higher speeds require electrification, which can double the cost of building a rail line, though trains on such lines benefit from higher efficiency leading to lower fuel costs, and the ability to accelerate and decelerate more rapidly which boosts rail line capacity.

== 2009 Midwest High Speed Rail Association proposal ==
For 2009, the Midwest High Speed Rail Association (MHSRA) and other organizations requested new studies of possible rail routes in the Midwest, this time with 220 miles per hour (350 km/h) service as the goal. These routes were identified:

- Chicago–Milwaukee–Madison–Rochester–Minneapolis/St. Paul-St. Cloud-Fargo-Bismarck
- Chicago–Champaign–Springfield–St. Louis
- Chicago–Gary–Lafayette–Indianapolis–Cincinnati
  - Cincinnati–Dayton–Columbus–Cleveland
- Chicago–Gary–Fort Wayne–Toledo–Detroit
- Chicago–Gary–Fort Wayne–Toledo–Cleveland-Erie-Buffalo
  - Cleveland–Pittsburgh

The MHSRA funded a study of the link from Chicago to St. Louis, while the Southeast Minnesota Rail Alliance funded a study of the route to Minneapolis/St. Paul—the third in a series previously funded by the Illinois, Wisconsin, and Minnesota Departments of Transportation.

== 2009 SNCF proposal ==
In late 2009, the French national rail company SNCF released studies of several rail corridors in the United States in California, Florida, Texas, and the Midwest. France has a population distribution similar to that in the Midwest, so their experiences with TGV trains and other high-speed systems could conceivably be duplicated in the U.S. The following routes were identified for a first phase of implementation:

- Chicago–Milwaukee–Madison–Eau Claire–Minneapolis/St. Paul
- Chicago–Bloomington/Normal–Springfield–St. Louis
- Chicago–Gary–Lafayette–Indianapolis–Cincinnati
- Chicago–Gary–Fort Wayne–Toledo–Detroit
- Chicago–Gary–Fort Wayne–Toledo–Cleveland

These routes were designed to allow them to overlay the Midwest Regional Rail Initiative plan. Like the MHSRA plan, the SNCF core routes would operate at up to 220 mph (350 km/h). The total cost was projected at $68.5 billion in 2009 dollars, with 54% of that projected to need public financing if a public-private partnership was pursued. The public funds could be recovered from revenues in about 15 years.

== Upgrades underway ==
Some construction has begun in Illinois and Michigan, primarily as testbeds for the upgraded signaling and control systems required for higher-speed rail. In Michigan, this work has already resulted in speeds up to 110 mph (180 km/h) for Amtrak's Wolverine and Blue Water services. Similar work on the Chicago–Saint Louis line in Illinois was met with considerable technical difficulties in 2005, though work continued.

In September 2008, the federal government provided $297,000 to fund a study of the plan; Amtrak and state governments matched these funds for a total of $594,000. Planners anticipate 13.6 million riders over the entire network by the year 2025.

The Chicago to Milwaukee Hiawatha was planned to be expanded to Madison, Wisconsin, but the project was then nixed in 2011 by then Wisconsin governor Scott Walker. In 2009, the Spanish manufacturer Talgo had agreed to open a plant in Wisconsin in order to build 110-mph trains for the Hiawatha route and other improved corridors; however, due to the cancellation of construction in Wisconsin, Talgo has scaled back plans from a manufacturing plant to a maintenance facility, leading the City of Milwaukee to consider legal action against the state.

=== American Recovery and Reinvestment Act of 2009 ===
In 2009, the federal government allocated $8 billion in the American Recovery and Reinvestment Act to be divided up among rail projects around the country. States in the Midwest made 24 applications to the government, and on January 28, 2010, the White House announced that the Chicago network would receive money for three of its requests, and two other grants were made to Midwestern states. The Chicago-based routes receiving funding were:

- $1.131 billion for Chicago–St. Louis–Kansas City ($1.1 billion for Chicago–St. Louis, $31 million for St. Louis–Kansas City)
- $823 million for Chicago–Milwaukee–Madison–Minneapolis/St. Paul ($810 million for Milwaukee–Madison, $12 million for Chicago–Milwaukee, remaining $600,000 to study possible alignments to the Twin Cities.)
- $244 million for Chicago–Detroit–Pontiac

An additional $400 million was released for the 3C corridor in Ohio connecting Cleveland, Columbus, Dayton, and Cincinnati, and $17 million was allocated to Iowa. Many of the corridors receiving funding at this time were originally designated as high-speed rail corridors following the 1991 ISTEA legislation.

=== 2010 ===
In October 2010, the Chicago Hub received more money from the FY 2010 High Speed Rail Allocation. The major grants were:

- $230 million for Chicago–Quad Cities–Iowa City
- $161 million for Chicago–Detroit–Pontiac

Following the 2010 gubernatorial elections in Wisconsin and Ohio, both newly elected governors repeated their intentions of shutting down the projects in these two states and returning the money to the federal government. In December 2010, the federal government redirected $1.195 billion originally designated for the Wisconsin and Ohio projects, consisting of $810 million from Wisconsin and $385 million from Ohio, to passenger rail projects in other states.

=== Chicago-St. Louis rail line upgrades ===
Before the upgrades, Amtrak passenger trains had a top speed of 79 MPH on the line between Chicago and St. Louis, and freight trains had a top speed of 60 MPH. In the fall of 2012, the section of the Chicago-St. Louis line between Pontiac, Illinois, and Dwight, Illinois, began Amtrak service at 110 MPH, as a demonstration section. In 2014 construction began to upgrade the entire rail line between Carlinville, Illinois, and Joliet, Illinois, so that Amtrak could run its passenger trains at 110 MPH. In addition, freight trains will be able to operate at 70 MPH.

The entire cost of the high-speed rail program was estimated at $1.8 billion, with the federal government committing $1.6 billion of that, later lowered to $1.4 billion. It is estimated that $1.2 billion will be spent on the program by the end of 2016.

On December 20, 2021, Amtrak train speeds were upgraded to 90 miles per hour (140 km/h) between Chicago and St Louis. This reduced travel time by 15 minutes between the two cities. Final approval for 110 mph (180 km/h) speeds was granted in May 2023, and higher-speed rail service began on Wednesday, May 3, 2023, saving passengers an additional 45 minutes in travel time.

== See also ==
- Amtrak Midwest
- Chicago–Detroit Line
- High-speed rail in the United States
- Midwest High Speed Rail Association
- Northern Lights Express
- Rochester Rail Link
