= Scott Rudolph =

Scott Rudolph is currently the president of Piping Rock Health Products (“Piping Rock”), a vitamin and health supplement company located in Ronkonkoma, New York, which Rudolph founded in May 2011. Prior to forming Piping Rock, Rudolph was the CEO and chairman of NBTY, Inc. Nature's Bounty, a manufacturer and marketer of nutritional supplements. Rudolph also founded of US Nutrition, Inc. a vitamin, mineral and nutritional supplement company which was purchased by NBTY in 1986.

Rudolph is a trustee at North Shore University Hospital and a member of the Young Presidents Organization (YPO). Rudolph was the interim president of Dowling College from September 2010 to May 2011, and serves as a member of the board of trustees. He received an honorary Doctor of Commercial Science degree from Dowling College.
