= Zip Rail =

Proposed passenger rail line in Minnesota, US

Overview
- Owner: Olmsted County Regional Railroad Authority

Zip Rail is a proposed passenger train that would link the Minneapolis–Saint Paul, Minnesota metropolitan area with the city of Rochester, also in the U.S. state of Minnesota. The project was previously branded as Rochester Rail Link.

North American High Speed Rail Group (NAHSR) proposed building a high-speed rail line on the same route. This is a separate proposal not connected with Zip Rail.

In 2016, the Minnesota Department of Transportation discontinued its study of the proposed Zip Rail project.

On May 21, 2023, the Minnesota House of Representatives and Minnesota Senate approved an Omnibus Transportation Bill which repealed the gag order imposed on studying ZIP rail in 2016. This also overturned a long-standing study ban on the Dan Patch Corridor.

== Past studies ==
Previous to Zip Rail, supporters had pushed for a Chicago - Minneapolis High Speed Rail (HSR) routing, through the city of Rochester, Minnesota. This routing was not chosen, largely due to the added costs of routing via Rochester versus the existing Amtrak route along the Mississippi River.

=== Tri-State Study ===
The Tri-State Rail Study was commissioned by the Departments of Transportation for the states of Illinois, Wisconsin, and Minnesota (hence the "Tri-State" name) and was completed in 1991. It examined the feasibility of train services on several routes, narrowed to two by 1990. The current route of Amtrak's Empire Builder was among those discarded and not studied in detail, but it was listed as a simple route comparison.

- Route No. 1, Amtrak's current route: Chicago to Milwaukee, then northwest to Portage and Tomah, then west to La Crosse before crossing the Mississippi and mostly running on the west side of the river to the Twin Cities. The "Amtrak upgrade" option for the southern corridor would make use of this right-of-way.
- Route No. 4, southern corridor: Chicago to Milwaukee, then straight west to Wisconsin's capital city of Madison, then north to Portage, west to La Crosse and on to Rochester, then turning north to the Twin Cities. This route was studied at 125 mph (201 km/h) (a so-called "Amtrak upgrade"), 185 mph (298 km/h) (TGV/Intercity Express-class service), and 300 mph (480 km/h) (maglev).
- Route No. 7, northern corridor: Chicago to Milwaukee, then continuing north to the Green Bay/Fox Cities region, and westward through Spencer and Eau Claire before reaching Minneapolis–Saint Paul. No passenger rail exists on this route beyond Milwaukee, and it was only studied at 185 (TGV/ICE) and 300 mph (maglev).

The study concluded that the "Amtrak upgrade" 125 mph option on the southern corridor through Rochester had the best direct return on investment, and was the best option for a capital-constrained public endeavor. In all cases, the southern corridor outperformed the northern corridor in the long term. The study made mention of "newly introduced Swedish Railroad 'tilt' technology", but it was not studied.

1991 study alternatives (southern corridor, Chicago–Twin Cities)
Speed	Motive power	Yearly ridership est.		Trip time	Capital cost (1989 $)	Net consumer surplus NPV
Speed	Motive power	2000	2024	Trip time	Capital cost (1989 $)	Net consumer surplus NPV
125 mph	diesel	5.8 million	8.1 million	4h20	$940 million	3004.8
185 mph	electric	7.5	10.6	3h15	$3.02 billion	3851.3
300 mph	maglev	8.5	12.2	2h15	$5.45 billion	3190.7

=== Tri-State II Study ===
The Tri-State II High Speed Rail Feasibility Study was commissioned by the Minnesota and Wisconsin Departments of Transportation and built upon the previous Tri-State study, plans from the Midwest Regional Rail Initiative (MWRRI), and a 1997 study looking at the Chicago–Milwaukee corridor. Since the MWRRI plans advocate 110 mph diesel or diesel multiple unit (DMU) technology (described as "incremental" by the study authors), this was used as the base case for the study.

This study also included gas turbine-powered trains, in comparison to diesels and electrics. It concluded that gas turbines operating at 150 mph were the best option. Development could begin at 110 mph, but the study authors stated the corridor should be developed to 150 mph standards to allow faster trains later.

2000 study alternatives (Chicago–Twin Cities)
Speed	Route	Motive power	Yearly ridership est.		Trip time	Capital cost ($)	Benefit/cost ratio
Speed	Route	Motive power	2020	?	Trip time	Capital cost ($)	Benefit/cost ratio
110 mph	MWRRI river route	diesel	2.9 million		5h27	$940 million	N/A
110 mph	Rochester, existing ROW	diesel	2.8		5h34	$1.26 billion	1.01
150 mph	Rochester, existing ROW	turbine	4.2		4h59	$3.10 billion	1.62
150 mph	New Rochester alignment	turbine	4.9		4h14	$3.66 billion	1.68
185 mph	Downtown Rochester, elevated	electric	5.9		3h11	$8.27 billion	1.34

=== Rochester Rail Link Study ===
In contrast to the previous two studies, the 2003 Rochester Rail Link Feasibility Study focused on a line to Rochester from the Twin Cities, but avoided discussing the merits of the city's presence on a line to Chicago in significant depth. The routes recommended in that study had one terminus at the Rochester International Airport (RST) at the southern end, and examined linking to downtown Minneapolis and to Minneapolis-St. Paul International Airport (MSP).

The study examined three motive-power options and recommended a TGV-like service linking the Twin Cities and Rochester using electrified trains operating at speeds up to 185 mph (298 km/h). In this study, the trains would carry a mixture of passengers and cargo, allowing the Rochester airport to take over some of the air freight capacity of MSP. In the leading example, a rate of 20 passenger trains per day was proposed, plus 4 freight trains in the overnight hours. The passenger estimates were made not based on projected market demand and supply but on a simplified model that if X number of seats were available, Y percentage of those seats would be filled at a Z price. The cost estimate for building the electrified line was $869 to $933 million (2002 dollars), largely depending on whether an entirely new route was used or if the line would closely follow Highway 52. The analysis claimed that the line would eventually pay for itself with passenger and cargo revenues more than covering the capital and operational costs over a 30-year period.

2003 study alternatives (Minneapolis–Rochester)
Speed	Motive power	Yearly ridership est.		Trip time	Capital cost (2002 $)	30-year benefit/cost ratio
Speed	Motive power	2010	2030	Trip time	Capital cost (2002 $)	30-year benefit/cost ratio
150+ mph	turbine	1.4 million	2.4 million	45–48 minutes	$697–769 million	1.35
180+ mph	electric	1.6	2.8	39–43 minutes	$869–933 million	1.38
220+ mph	maglev	2.4	4.3	31–39 minutes	$5.6– 5.9 billion	0.56

=== Tri-State III Study ===
The Tri-State III High-Speed Rail Study of 2009 was commissioned by the Southeastern Minnesota Rail Alliance, a rail advocacy group based in Rochester. This study is partly a rehashing of the Tri-State II study, but with greater detail in examining the speeds possible along the current Amtrak route along the Mississippi River versus what would be possible by going through Rochester. There are many segments along the river that can only support 90 mph top speeds or lower due to curvature.

The study asserted that 220 mph service via Rochester, which is a higher speed than what has been recommended in other studies for a publicly funded system, would be the best option and would be the most profitable. The study authors noted that the amount of funding available for the project in Minnesota is constrained. Because of this they suggested a diesel-electric powered 110 mph service via Rochester. They claimed this would be profitable. They called for the route to allow for future upgrades and improvements that could be done over time.

2009 study alternatives (Twin Cities–Chicago)
Speed	Route	Motive power	Yearly ridership est.		Trip time (Express)	Capital cost ($)	Benefit/cost ratio
Speed	Route	Motive power	2020	?	Trip time (Express)	Capital cost ($)	Benefit/cost ratio
110 mph	Mississippi River	diesel	4.3 million		5h19	$3.2 billion	1.60
110 mph	Rochester	diesel	4.7		5h26	$3.3 billion	1.86
220 mph	Rochester	electric	7.7		3h11	$6.6 billion	2.25

== Past passenger service to Rochester ==
Rochester previously had passenger service run by the Chicago and North Western and the Chicago Great Western railways. Rail passenger service to the city ended in 1963.

Rochester was served by many numbered trains. Named trains included the following:

Chicago and North Western:

- Rochester 400 (Mankato–Chicago, the final iteration of the Minnesota 400 and then the Dakota 400)
- Rochester Minnesota Special

Chicago Great Western:

- Blue Bird (Twin Cities–Rochester)
- Rochester Special (Twin Cities–Rochester)
- Red Bird (Twin Cities–Rochester)

== See also ==
- Midwest Regional Rail Initiative
