= Keith Detelj =

American soccer player

Personal information
- Date of birth: July 22, 1985 (age 41)
- Place of birth: Ronkonkoma, New York, U.S.
- Height: 1.74 m (5 ft 9 in)
- Position: Forward

College career
Years	Team	Apps	(Gls)
2003–2006	Marist Red Foxes		

Senior career*
Years	Team	Apps	(Gls)
2009	Fort Wayne Fever	12	(1)
2010	Westchester Flames	15	(5)
2011–2012	Long Island Roughriders	28	(18)
2014	Greek American AA		
2014	Dayton Dutch Lions	3	(0)
- * Club domestic league appearances and goals as of September 12, 2014

Keith Detelj (born July 22, 1985) is an American retired soccer player.

== Career ==
Detelj played in the USL PDL between 2009 and 2012 with clubs such as Fort Wayne Fever, Westchester Flames and Long Island Roughriders, before signing his first professional contract with USL Pro club Dayton Dutch Lions on August 15, 2014.
