= Ohio Hub =

Proposed US railway project

The Ohio Hub was a high-speed railway project proposed in the 2000s by the Ohio Department of Transportation aimed at revitalizing passenger rail service in Ohio and surrounding states. The plan was awarded funding under the American Recovery and Reinvestment Act of 2009, but Governor John Kasich refused to use the funds for the project and the funds were reclaimed by the federal government. Passage of the 2021 Infrastructure Investment and Jobs Act raised the possibility of new funding for a similar project.

== Background ==
Passenger service between Cincinnati, Columbus, and Cleveland ended on May 1, 1971, when the Ohio State Limited was discontinued upon the assumption of Penn Central Transportation's passenger service by Amtrak.

== Initial plans ==
Upon completion, the transit system would have been composed of 860 mi (1,380 km) of track serving 32 stations. It would connect four states along with southern Ontario, consisting of 11 major metropolitan areas and 22 million people. The system's goal was to "expand the capacity of the transportation system by improving the railroads for both freight and passenger trains."

As of the mid-2000s, the initial startup cost was projected to be in the $500 million range. This did not include the cost of trains or the preparations needed for high-speed service. Two high-speed train systems were being explored. The first, a 79-mile-per-hour (127 km/h) system, was expected to cost $2.7 billion, or $3.5 million per mile. The second option, a 110-mile-per-hour (180 km/h) higher-speed system was estimated to cost $3.32 billion, or $4.5 million per mile.

The project's hub was proposed to be based at Cleveland Hopkins International Airport (the state's largest and busiest airport) with a second Cleveland location near downtown Cleveland, and to provide service to adjacent cities in both the state of Ohio and the Ohio Region. Three proposals were made for service – a single line system from Cleveland to Cincinnati, and two networked systems with multiple corridors providing service from Cleveland to various cities around the Ohio Region. Each corridor would branch out from Cleveland, and serve from four to nine stations, as well as connections to other regional rail services. Additional lines were proposed to connect the planned corridors with each other throughout the state, as well as to add more stations between major cities.

The full Ohio & Lake Erie Regional Rail proposal would provide service to four states plus Canada through four corridors originating in Cleveland. An additional network was proposed with three additional lines (seven lines total), however was still under development. The proposal featured the following four corridors:

- Northwest corridor to Detroit
  - Serves Toledo and Detroit
  - 7 stations total
  - Connects with future Midwest Regional Rail to Chicago, and Via Rail Canada to Montreal and Quebec City
- Northeast corridor to Toronto
  - Not to be confused with Amtrak's Northeast Corridor between Boston and Washington DC.
  - Serves Erie, Buffalo, Niagara Falls, and Toronto
  - 11 stations total
  - Connects with Empire Corridor to Albany and New York City, and Via Rail Canada to Montreal and Quebec City
- Southwest corridor to Cincinnati
  - Originally proposed as the 3-C Corridor
  - Serves Columbus, Dayton, and Cincinnati
  - 9 stations total
  - Connects with future Midwest Regional Rail to Indianapolis and Chicago
- Southeast corridor to Pittsburgh
  - Serves Pittsburgh
  - 4 stations total
  - Connects with Keystone Corridor to Harrisburg and Philadelphia

== Awarding and rejection of funding ==
On January 28, 2010, the White House announced that Ohio would receive $400 million of its request through the American Recovery and Reinvestment Act of 2009. This allowed for passenger rail service to return specifically on the 3C corridor. The 3C Corridor could provide service from Cleveland to Columbus, Dayton, and Cincinnati, a distance of 255 miles (410 km). The service was predicted to carry around 478,000 people a year, using a subsidy of $17 million from the state government.

The proposed corridor, however, attracted opposition from Republican members of the state board in charge of the project, as the proposed six-hour travel time and 39 mph (63 km/h) average speed led the project to be dubbed "snail rail". Then-governor and rail proponent Ted Strickland said in April 2010 that the average speed could be increased to 46 mph (74 km/h), but Republicans were still not sold on it.

On September 24, 2010, the Federal Railroad Administration authorized the state to spend $15 million of the stimulus money for the purposes of determining specifications and completing studies regarding the corridor. Also on the 24th, the state released a new schedule for the service, which would see three daily round trips being operated, taking slightly over five hours each way, an hour and a half faster than previous estimates.

Following the 2010 gubernatorial elections in Ohio, the newly elected governor John Kasich (Republican) began the process of shutting down the project and returning the money to the federal government. This money would be redistributed to other applicants. In a press conference, Kasich said that "[t]hat train is dead. I said it during the campaign. It is dead. Passenger rail is not in Ohio’s future."

On December 9, 2010, US Transportation Secretary Ray LaHood announced that the federal government had revoked the funding for the 3C corridor, which would be redirected to high-speed rail projects in other states. The $400 million was reclaimed by the White House, following repeated promises by Governor John Kasich to cancel the project. He attempted to get permission to use the funds on other transportation related projects, but this was rejected by the White House. The money reclaimed was divided among several other states, including California, New York and Florida.

As of 2015, funding for the Ohio Hub project remained on hold, though it has never been officially canceled.

== Revival as 3C+D ==
Plans were restarted around 2020 as Amtrak sought to expand and create new medium-distance rail services, though not as high-speed rail. In May 2021 further plans were presented to Columbus officials regarding the proposed service, which is expected to commence service by 2035.

By 2020, Amtrak was proposing to substantially increase rail service through the state. The 2021 Infrastructure Investment and Jobs Act raised the possibility of new funding for new and increased service in Ohio.

In December 2023, three Ohio routes were accepted into the Federal Railroad Administration's Corridor Identification and Development Program, a mechanism for developing new train routes under the Infrastructure Investment and Jobs Act. Each of these corridors are granted $500,000 toward engineering and feasibility studies and are prioritized for future federal funding:

- Cleveland–Columbus–Dayton–Cincinnati
- Cleveland–Toledo–Detroit
- Chicago–Fort Wayne–Columbus–Pittsburgh

Lakefront Station in Cleveland would be unable to accommodate this increase in service, which is why a group by the name of All Aboard Ohio is pushing for the restoration of rail service at Cleveland Union Terminal.
