= Diamond State Line =

Proposed Amtrak route

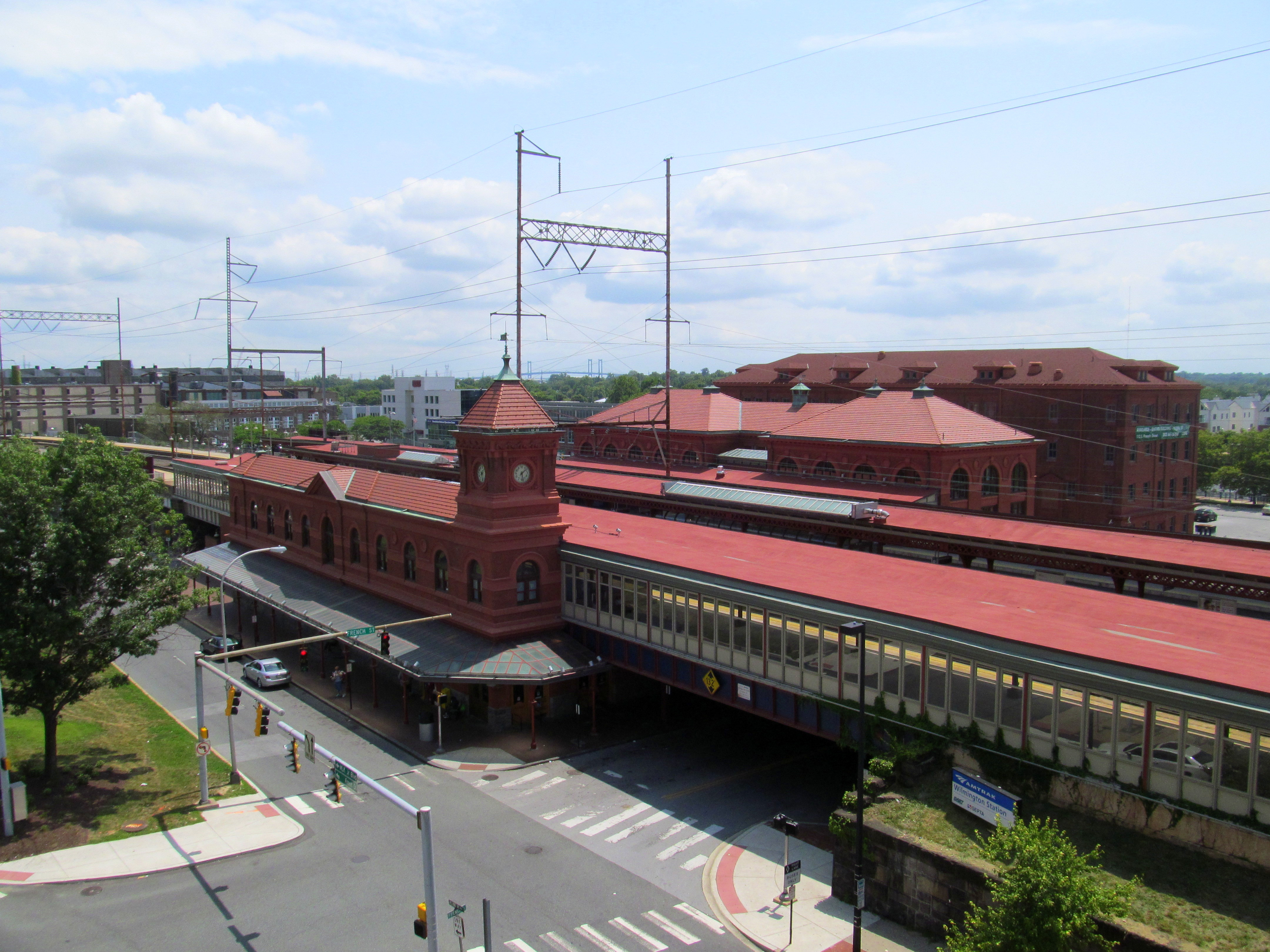
- Wilmington, Delaware's train station on the Northeast Corridor.

Overview
- Service type: Inter-city rail
- Status: Proposed
- Locale: Delaware, Maryland
- Current operator: Amtrak
- Website: dartfirststate.com

Route
- Termini: Newark or Wilmington; Salisbury or Berlin

Technical
- Track gauge: 4 ft 8 1/2 in (1,435 mm) standard gauge

The Diamond State Line is a proposed inter-city passenger train service running through the state of Delaware ending in southern Maryland.

== Background ==
This proposal is part of the Corridor Identification and Development Program, which is a program that provides grants for creating new and improving pre-existing inter-city passenger rail services. Through this program the Federal Railroad Administration gave the Delaware Transit Corporation a $500,000 grant for determining the cost, scope, and schedule for building the proposal.

The whole route has not been decided, but it will start in either Newark or Wilmington then connect to Salisbury or Berlin via Dover. The railroads the Delaware Transit Corporation intends to use are owned by Delmarva Central Railroad and Maryland and Delaware Railroad.
