= Verne Harnish =

American business writer

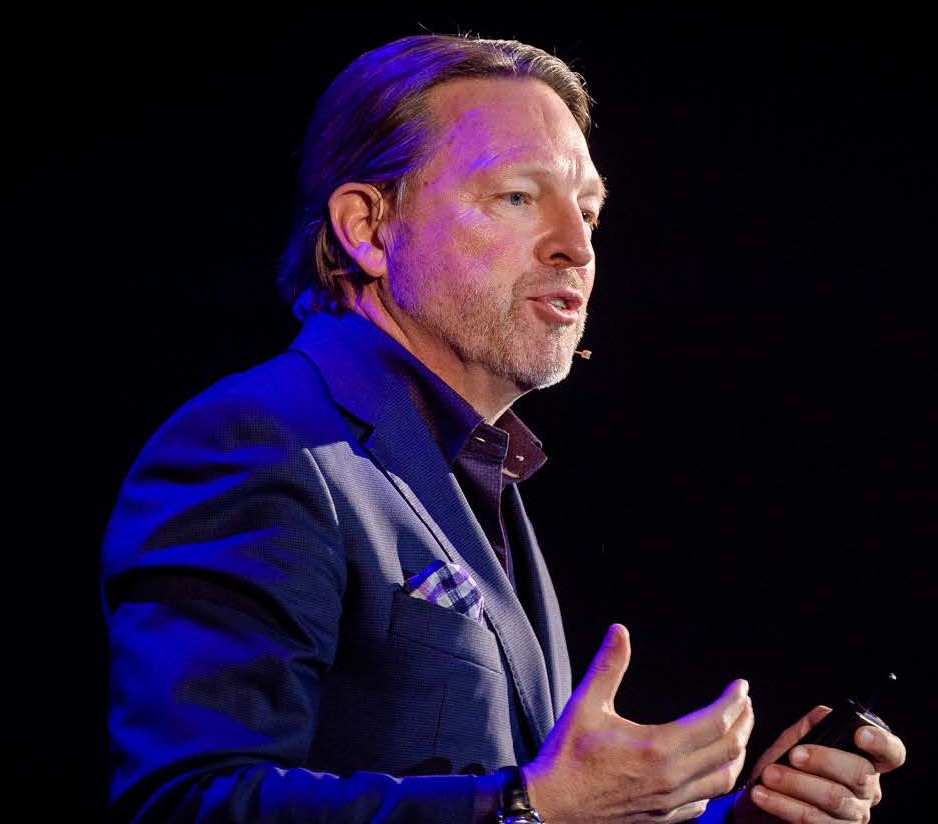
- Harnish speaking in Germany in 2021
- Born: January 21, 1959 (age 67)
- Education: Wichita State University
- Occupations: Entrepreneur, Organizer, writer, columnist
- Organization: Entrepreneurs' Organization

Verne C. Harnish is an American business writer, who founded the Entrepreneurs' Organization. He also founded Scaling Up, the Association of Collegiate Entrepreneurs, and Growth Institute.

== Education ==
Harnish received a bachelor's degree in mechanical engineering and an M.B.A. from Wichita State University, where he founded and chaired the Association of Collegiate Entrepreneurs.

== Career ==
He founded and chaired for 15 years EO’s executive program called the “Birthing of Giants”, held at Massachusetts Institute of Technology and the MIT/WEO Advanced Business Program for entrepreneurs over 40. Harnish is a Global Scaleup Fellow at The Entrepreneurship Center at Harvard.

== Bibliography ==
- Mastering the Rockefeller Habits (2002)
- The Greatest Business Decisions of All-Time (2012)
- Scaling Up: How a Few Companies Make It...and Why the Rest Don't (2014)
- Scaling Up Compensation. 5 Design Principles for Turning Your Largest Expense into a Strategic Advantage co-author Sebastian Ross (2022)
- 20th Anniversary Edition of Mastering the Rockefeller Habits (2022)
- Scaling Up: How a Few Companies Make It...and Why the Rest Don't (Rockefeller Habits 2.0 Revised Edition) (2022)
- Start to Scale (2024)
