= Dallas–Fort Worth high-speed rail =

Proposed high-speed rail corridor in the Dallas–Fort Worth metroplex

Overview
- Owner: North Central Texas Council of Governments
- Locale: Dallas–Fort Worth metroplex
- Termini: Fort Worth Central Station; Hutchison Convention Center
- Stations: 3
- Website: nctcog.org

Service
- Type: High-speed rail
- Services: 1
- Operator(s): Texas Central Partners, LLC
- Rolling stock: N700S Series Shinkansen

Technical
- Number of tracks: 2
- Character: fully grade separated
- Track gauge: 4 ft 8 1/2 in (1,435 mm) standard gauge
- Electrification: 25 kV 60 Hz AC overhead catenary
- Operating speed: 186–205 mph (300–330 km/h)

The Dallas–Fort Worth high-speed rail corridor is a proposed high-speed rail corridor in the Dallas–Fort Worth metroplex. It is being studied by the North Central Texas Council of Governments and will function as an extension of the Texas Central Railway, which is planned to run from Dallas to Houston.
