= Frasca Field =

- IATA: none; ICAO: none; FAA LID: C16

Summary
- Airport type: Public
- Owner: Frasca Air Service, Inc.
- Serves: Urbana, Illinois
- Elevation AMSL: 735 ft (224 m)
- Coordinates: 40°08′47″N 88°11′55″W

Map
- Location of airport in Champaign County/Illinois/United States C16 (Illinois) C16 (the United States)

Runways
Direction	Length		Surface
Direction	ft	m	Surface
9/27	4,001	1,220	Concrete
18/36	3,654	1,114	Turf

Statistics
- Based aircraft (2020): 65
- Source: Federal Aviation Administration

Frasca Field (FAA LID: C16) is a privately owned, public use airport located at the northern edge of Urbana in Champaign County, Illinois, United States. It is owned by Frasca Air Service, which also serves as the fixed-base operator (FBO). The airport serves the greater Champaign-Urbana Metropolitan Area in East Central Illinois.

Frasca Field is located on US Route 45 and is accessible via I-74 exit 184 heading north. It is on the opposite side of the city from Willard Airport and is favored by private and corporate operators due to lower traffic volume.

== History ==
Frasca Field was previously owned and operated as Illini Airport by Louis Dyson. In 1980, Illini Airport was acquired by Frasca Air Service, and the name was changed to Frasca Field.

The airport previously managed its own charter company and flight school before shifting its business to renting aircraft storage space and selling fuel. The airport was subsidized until 2021 by Frasca International, the flight simulator company the airport's owners started in 1958.

The airport was named Illinois' top privately owned airport in 2012 and 2021. The award was given out by the Illinois Department of Transportation during the Airport of the Year awards ceremony.

The Frasca family sold their flight simulator company in January 2022 but retained ownership of the airport.

== Facilities ==
Frasca Field covers an area of 80 acres (32 ha). The airport has two runways:

- Runway 9/27: 4,001 x 55 ft. (1220 x 17 m), surface: concrete
- Runway 18/36: 3,654 x 140 ft. (1114 x 43 m), surface: turf, with a displaced threshold for runway 36

Frasca Field operates an event rental space with indoor and outdoor options. The space features aircraft and aviation memorabilia. The space includes the use of a large aircraft hangar, an indoor clubhouse, and an outdoor space.

For the 12-month period ending April 30, 2020, the airport averaged 41 aircraft operations per day, or about 15,000 per year. Operations consisted of 90% general aviation and 10% air taxi.

In April 2020, there were 65 aircraft based at this airport: 60 single-engine and 3 multi-engine airplanes and one helicopter and one glider.

== Accidents and incidents ==
- On December 27, 1998, an aircraft conducting an instructional flight crashed on approach to Frasca. The plane was stabilized on approach when the student suddenly pushed the nose forward. The flight instructor onboard attempted to recover by countering the action and adding engine power, but the aircraft was too close to the ground for recovery.
- On February 9, 2003, a Beech BE-G36 Bonanza sustained substantial damage when the rudder pedals vibrated during maneuvers on a local flight at C16. It was later found the left stabilizer had been overloaded and partially damaged during the maneuvers. The aircraft landed normally at the airport and the pilot was uninjured.
- On February 17, 2011, a Mooney M20 crashed into a yard while attempting to land at Frasca. The aircraft landed in a crosswind when the pilot attempted to go around. The aircraft struggled to climb away from the ground, and its wing eventually clipped the ground and summersaulted.

== See also ==
- List of airports in Illinois
