= Entrepreneurs' Organization =

Global non-profit organization

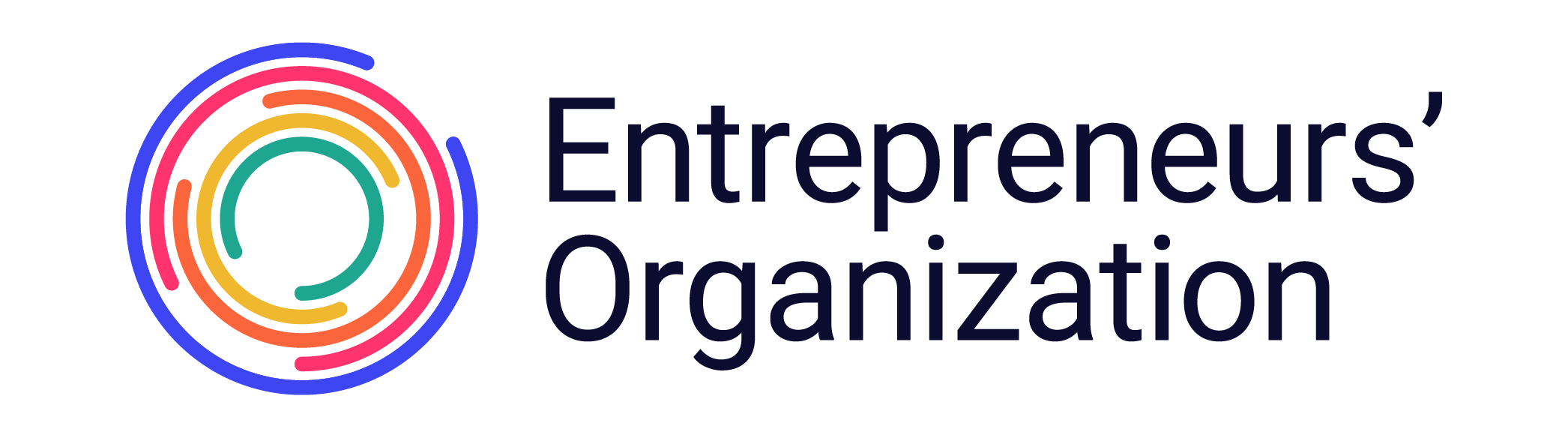
- Founded: 1987
- Founder: 22 founders
- Tax ID no.: 52-1651248
- Legal status: 501(c)(3) nonprofit organization
- Headquarters: Alexandria, Virginia, United States
- Region served: Owners and founders of businesses with at least US$1,000,000 in revenue
- Members: 19,531
- EO Chair: Joaquín ('Quini') Cordero
- Interim Executive Director: Jamie Pujara
- Website: www.eonetwork.org
- Formerly called: Young Entrepreneurs' Organization

Entrepreneurs' Organization (EO) is a global non-profit organization formerly known as the Young Entrepreneurs' Organization (YEO), that was founded in 1987.

== History ==
In 1987, 22 young entrepreneurs founded an organization initially known as The Young Entrepreneurs' Organization (YEO) which expanded throughout the United States and Canada. Within a few years, membership grew to include chapters in Latin America, Europe, the Middle East, Africa, and Asia. In 1996, YEO helped create the World Entrepreneurs' Organization (WEO), which served as an alumni organization for YEO members who, after the age of 40, wanted to continue their involvement in an entrepreneurial membership organization. In 2005, YEO and WEO merged to form the Entrepreneurs' Organization (EO) as it is known today. They continue to focus on youth with the annual Global Student Entrepreneur Awards and pitch contest.

== Membership ==
Verne Harnish is the founder of the Young Entrepreneurs' Organization and recruited 22 entrepreneurs as founding board members to initially fund the start-up of the organization. Some of the members were Kevin Harrington, of Shark Tank fame, Julie Brice, founder of I Can't Believe It's Yogurt, Neil Balter of the California Closet Company, and Lisa Renshaw of Penn Parking Inc. Members are required to have controlling ownership of a company with annual revenue of at least one million dollars. Membership has grown to over 18,000+ worldwide with an average age of 44 and a series of chapters in more than 60 countries. As of 2015, it was estimated that approximately fifteen percent focused in arts and other soft businesses.

== Global Entrepreneur Indicator ==
The Global Entrepreneur Indicator (GEI) began in 2010 as a semi-annual survey of the membership of the Entrepreneurs' Organization. The Global Entrepreneur Indicator surveys a globally representative sample of entrepreneurs to predict economic trends in a number of areas, including job creation, profits and debt loads, economic forecasting, and the business environment.

In 2012, the GEI found that approximately 60% of businesses experienced a net profit, while 59% increased their employee headcount.

== International chapters ==
Entrepreneurs’ Organization operates through a global network of local chapters established in major business centers worldwide. As of recent years, the organization has maintained chapters in countries including the United States, Canada, the United Kingdom, Germany, France, Switzerland, the Netherlands, Spain, Italy, Australia, New Zealand, India, Singapore, Hong Kong, China, Japan, Brazil, Mexico, Argentina, South Africa, the United Arab Emirates, Israel, and others. These national and city-based chapters function as the primary units of member engagement, organizing local forums, educational programs, and networking activities while remaining integrated into EO’s regional and global governance structure.
