= Ronkonkoma, New York =

Ronkonkoma, New York Raconkumake
- Hamlet and census-designated place
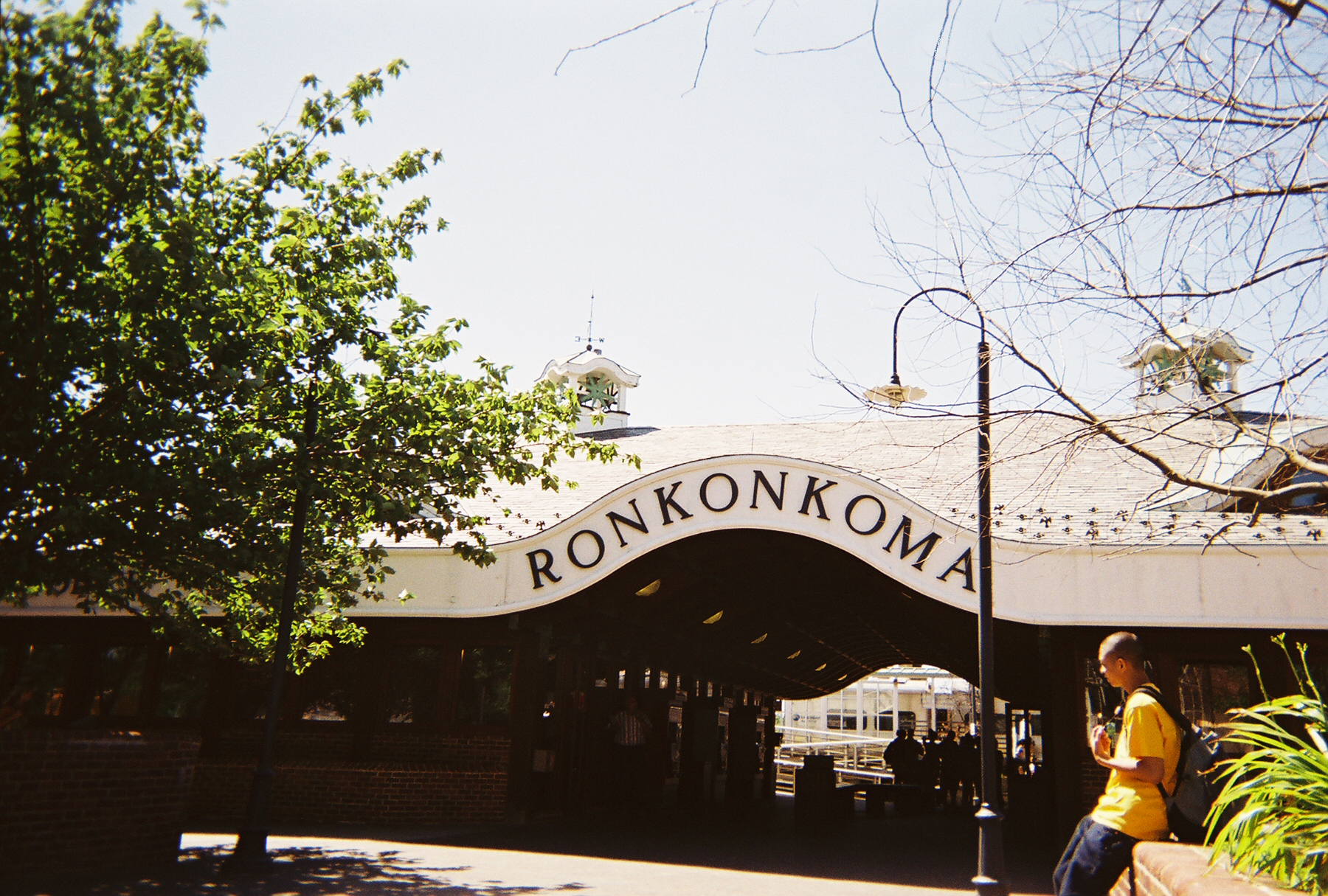
- The Ronkonkoma train station, located within Ronkonkoma

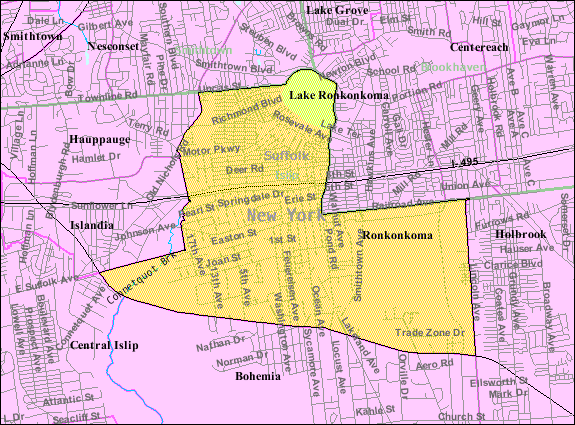
- U.S. Census map

- Location on Long Island Location within the state of New York
- Coordinates: 40°48′50″N 73°7′42″W
- Country: United States
- State: New York
- County: Suffolk
- Town: Islip

Area
  - Total: 8.44 sq mi (21.86 km^{2})
  - Land: 8.11 sq mi (21.00 km^{2})
  - Water: 0.33 sq mi (0.86 km^{2})
- Elevation: 112 ft (34 m)

Population (2020)
  - Total: 18,955
  - Density: 2,337.8/sq mi (902.63/km^{2})
- Time zone: UTC-5 (Eastern (EST))
  - Summer (DST): UTC-4 (EDT)
- ZIP Code: 11779
- Area codes: 631, 934
- FIPS code: 36-63473
- GNIS feature ID: 0962854

Ronkonkoma (/rɒnˈkɒŋkəmə/ ron-KONG-kə-mə) is a hamlet and census-designated place (CDP) located within the Town of Islip, in Suffolk County, on Long Island, in New York, United States. The population was 18,955 at the time of the 2020 census.

The Ronkonkoma post office has the ZIP Code 11779 and serves the CDP along with portions of several adjacent hamlets and CDPs.

The hamlet is also home to Long Island MacArthur Airport, which is owned and operated by the Town of Islip. The New York Air Route Traffic Control Center is located at the airport.

== History ==
The name "Ronkonkoma" comes from the nearby Lake Ronkonkoma, which in turn comes from an Algonquian expression meaning "boundary fishing-lake", also earlier written as "Raconkumake" and "Raconkamuck."

Ronkonkoma was the terminus of the first road in the United States designed exclusively for automobiles, the Vanderbilt Motor Parkway, constructed by a consortium of investors called the Long Island Motor Parkway, Inc.; the consortium was led by William Kissam Vanderbilt II.

In May 1943, Long Island MacArthur Airport – located within the hamlet – was activated. The airport would begin serving scheduled commercial passenger flights in 1960, when Allegheny Airlines commenced service at MacArthur that year. The Town of Islip announced plans in 2025 to construct a new passenger terminal on the north side of the town-owned airport, adjacent – and connected – to the Ronkonkoma LIRR station.

In 1982, the Town of Islip Foreign Trade Zone – located adjacent to MacArthur Airport – opened. It is a magnet site for Foreign Trade Zone 52 and, as of 2026, is the only designated foreign trade zone on Long Island outside of New York City.

Since 1988, the community has been the end of electrification along the Long Island Rail Road's Main Line. The portion of the Main Line between the Hicksville and Ronkonkoma stations is known as the Ronkonkoma Branch.

In 2017, then-Governor Andrew M. Cuomo announced the groundbreaking of a major development project to create a "Ronkonkoma Hub" adjacent to the Ronkonkoma LIRR station in Lake Ronkonkoma, straddling the north side of its border with the Ronkonkoma CDP (and, in turn, the Brookhaven–Islip town border); at the time of the announcement, the total cost of the project was estimated to be $650 million. This development project, known as Station Yards, would spur economic development on both sides of the tracks, in Ronkonkoma and Lake Ronkonkoma. As of 2026, the total cost of the project is expected to be approximately $1.2 billion.

== Geography ==
According to the United States Census Bureau, the CDP has a total area of 8.1 square miles (21.1 km^{2}), of which 0.35 square miles (0.9 km^{2}), or 4.07%, is covered by water.

The Lake Ronkonkoma kettle lake is located entirely within Ronkonkoma – not the neighboring, eponymous hamlet.

=== Climate ===
Under the Köppen climate classification, Ronkonkoma has a humid continental climate (Dfa), with some maritime influence, or under the −3 °C or 26.6 °F threshold a humid subtropical climate (Cfa); it is part of USDA hardiness zone 7a. The normal average monthly temperature ranges from 31.9 °F (−0.1 °C) in January to 75.0 °F (23.9 °C) in July; on average, there are 16.3 afternoons where the temperature remains at or below freezing and 8.3 afternoons with a high at or above 90 °F or 32.2 °C annually; the last year to not reach the latter mark was 2014. Temperatures below −5 °F (−20.6 °C) or above 100 °F (37.8 °C) are rare, and were last seen respectively on January 7, 2018, at −5 °F or −20.6 °C and July 22, 2011, at 100 °F or 37.8 °C. The record low is −14 °F or −25.6 °C, set on February 13, 1967, while the record high is 104 °F or 40 °C, set on July 3, 1966.

Precipitation averages 45.99 inches or 1,170 millimetres annually, and is somewhat evenly distributed throughout the year, though March and April are the wettest months in terms of total precipitation. Snowfall averages 31.8 inches or 0.81 metres per year, falling almost entirely from November to April.

Climate data for Ronkonkoma, New York (Long Island MacArthur Airport), 1991–2020 normals, extremes 1963–present
Month	Jan	Feb	Mar	Apr	May	Jun	Jul	Aug	Sep	Oct	Nov	Dec	Year
Record high °F (°C)	69 (21)	71 (22)	82 (28)	94 (34)	98 (37)	96 (36)	104 (40)	100 (38)	94 (34)	89 (32)	80 (27)	77 (25)	104 (40)
Mean maximum °F (°C)	58.2 (14.6)	57.1 (13.9)	66.7 (19.3)	77.0 (25.0)	85.8 (29.9)	90.4 (32.4)	94.0 (34.4)	91.2 (32.9)	86.0 (30.0)	78.6 (25.9)	68.8 (20.4)	60.9 (16.1)	95.6 (35.3)
Mean daily maximum °F (°C)	39.2 (4.0)	41.0 (5.0)	47.7 (8.7)	58.3 (14.6)	68.3 (20.2)	77.2 (25.1)	82.8 (28.2)	81.4 (27.4)	74.8 (23.8)	64.1 (17.8)	53.6 (12.0)	44.4 (6.9)	61.1 (16.2)
Daily mean °F (°C)	31.9 (−0.1)	33.3 (0.7)	39.9 (4.4)	49.7 (9.8)	59.5 (15.3)	69.0 (20.6)	75.0 (23.9)	73.7 (23.2)	66.9 (19.4)	55.7 (13.2)	45.6 (7.6)	37.1 (2.8)	53.1 (11.7)
Mean daily minimum °F (°C)	24.6 (−4.1)	25.5 (−3.6)	32.0 (0.0)	41.2 (5.1)	50.8 (10.4)	60.9 (16.1)	67.3 (19.6)	66.0 (18.9)	58.9 (14.9)	47.3 (8.5)	37.6 (3.1)	29.8 (−1.2)	45.2 (7.3)
Mean minimum °F (°C)	7.4 (−13.7)	9.8 (−12.3)	17.0 (−8.3)	28.8 (−1.8)	37.9 (3.3)	48.4 (9.1)	57.7 (14.3)	55.7 (13.2)	45.4 (7.4)	33.0 (0.6)	22.9 (−5.1)	15.8 (−9.0)	5.4 (−14.8)
Record low °F (°C)	−8 (−22)	−14 (−26)	0 (−18)	16 (−9)	32 (0)	42 (6)	49 (9)	45 (7)	38 (3)	23 (−5)	11 (−12)	−1 (−18)	−14 (−26)
Average precipitation inches (mm)	3.66 (93)	3.29 (84)	4.51 (115)	4.06 (103)	3.28 (83)	4.00 (102)	3.26 (83)	4.24 (108)	3.60 (91)	3.97 (101)	3.41 (87)	4.71 (120)	45.99 (1,168)
Average snowfall inches (cm)	10.3 (26)	9.4 (24)	6.5 (17)	0.6 (1.5)	0.0 (0.0)	0.0 (0.0)	0.0 (0.0)	0.0 (0.0)	0.0 (0.0)	0.0 (0.0)	0.5 (1.3)	4.5 (11)	31.8 (81)
Average extreme snow depth inches (cm)	6.6 (17)	6.4 (16)	3.7 (9.4)	0.5 (1.3)	0.0 (0.0)	0.0 (0.0)	0.0 (0.0)	0.0 (0.0)	0.0 (0.0)	0.0 (0.0)	0.2 (0.51)	3.0 (7.6)	11.3 (29)
Average precipitation days (≥ 0.01 in)	11.1	9.9	10.8	11.3	11.6	10.1	9.1	8.9	8.6	9.2	9.6	11.8	122.0
Average snowy days (≥ 0.1 in)	3.8	3.7	2.7	0.3	0.0	0.0	0.0	0.0	0.0	0.0	0.3	2.6	13.4
Source: NOAA

=== Neighborhoods ===
Lake Hills is north of the Long Island Expressway and south of Long Island Motor Parkway, roughly bounded by Rosevale Avenue and Ocean Avenue to the east, and Terry Road to the west.

Lakeland is south of the Long Island Expressway and north of Veterans Memorial Highway, bounded on the west by Lakeland County Park & Connetquot River State Park Preserve, and on the east by Ronkonkoma Avenue & Lakeland Avenue.

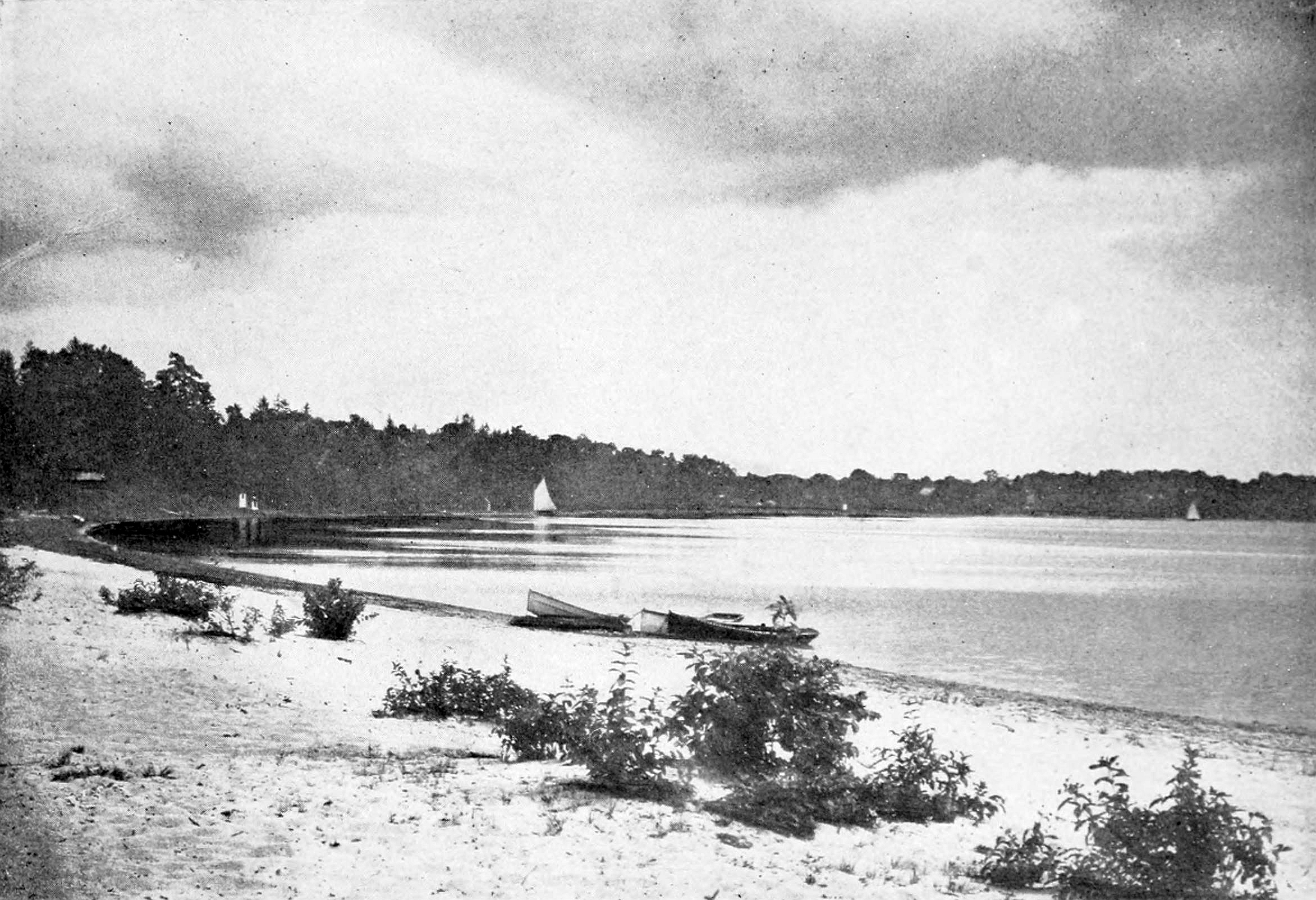
Lake Ronkonkoma in 1901

== Economy ==
Vitamin maker The Bountiful Company is based in Ronkonkoma.

Northrop Grumman has a hypersonic test and manufacturing facility adjacent to the Long Island MacArthur Airport.

The town-owned Town of Islip Foreign Trade Zone is located within Ronkonkoma, adjacent to Long Island MacArthur Airport.

== Demographics ==
Historical population
Census	Pop.	Note	%±
2000	20,029		—
2010	19,082		−4.7%
2020	18,955		−0.7%
U.S. Decennial Census

=== 2020 census ===
As of the 2020 census, Ronkonkoma had a population of 18,955. The median age was 40.9 years. 20.4% of residents were under the age of 18, 6.1% were under the age of five, and 15.6% were 65 years of age or older. For every 100 females there were 95.2 males, and for every 100 females age 18 and over there were 93.6 males age 18 and over.

100.0% of residents lived in urban areas, while 0.0% lived in rural areas.

There were 6,496 households in Ronkonkoma, of which 34.7% had children under the age of 18 living in them. Of all households, 56.7% were married-couple households, 15.1% were households with a male householder and no spouse or partner present, and 21.6% were households with a female householder and no spouse or partner present. About 19.3% of all households were made up of individuals and 7.3% had someone living alone who was 65 years of age or older.

There were 6,701 housing units, of which 3.1% were vacant. The homeowner vacancy rate was 1.4% and the rental vacancy rate was 3.2%.

Racial composition as of the 2020 census
Race	Number	Percent
White	14,352	75.7%
Black or African American	588	3.1%
American Indian and Alaska Native	33	0.2%
Asian	1,181	6.2%
Native Hawaiian and Other Pacific Islander	8	0.0%
Some other race	1,080	5.7%
Two or more races	1,713	9.0%
Hispanic or Latino (of any race)	2,814	14.8%

=== Income and poverty ===
The median income for a household in the CDP was $114,216, while the per capita income for the CDP was $41,792. About 3.5% of the population were below the poverty line.

== Government ==
=== Local government ===
As an unincorporated area within the Town of Islip, Ronkonkoma is directly governed by the Islip Town Council, seated in Islip.

Ronkonkoma is located within Islip's 4th council district, which as of April 2025 is represented in the Islip Town Council by John M. Lorenzo (R–West Sayville).

=== Representation in higher government ===
==== Suffolk County representation ====
Ronkonkoma is primarily located within Suffolk County's 10th Legislative district, which as of April 2025 is represented in the Suffolk County Legislature by Trish Bergin (R–East Islip).

==== New York State representation ====
===== New York State Assembly =====
Ronkonkoma is located within New York's 5th State Assembly district, which as of April 2025 is represented in the New York State Assembly by Douglas M. Smith (R–Holbrook).

===== New York State Senate =====
Ronkonkoma is located within the New York State Senate's 8th State Senate district, which as of April 2025 is represented in the New York State Senate by Alexis Weik (R–Sayville).

==== Federal representation ====
===== United States Congress =====
Ronkonkoma is located within New York's 2nd congressional district, which as of April 2025 is represented in the United States Congress by Andrew Garbarino (R–Bayport).

==== United States Senate ====
Like the rest of New York, Ronkonkoma is represented in the United States Senate by Charles Schumer (D) and Kirsten Gillibrand (D).

=== Politics ===
In the 2024 U.S. presidential election, the majority of Ronkonkoma voters voted for Donald J. Trump (R).

== Education ==
=== Schools ===
Almost all of Ronkonkoma CDP is located within the Connetquot Central School District. Three public elementary schools are in Ronkonkoma, with one middle school, and high school students attend Connetquot High School in Bohemia.

A portion of the CDP to the east is in the Sachem Central School District, while portions of its west end extend into Central Islip Union Free School District – although the latter portion is taken up entirely by portions of the Connetquot River State Park Preserve. A small portion of the CDP's northwestern corner, furthermore, is located within the Hauppauge Union Free School District.

=== Libraries ===
Ronkonkoma is located within the boundaries of (and is thus served by) the Central Islip Library District, the Connetquot Library District, the Hauppauge Library District, and the Sachem Library District. The boundaries of these districts roughly correspond to those of the school districts.

== Infrastructure ==
=== Transportation ===
==== Air ====
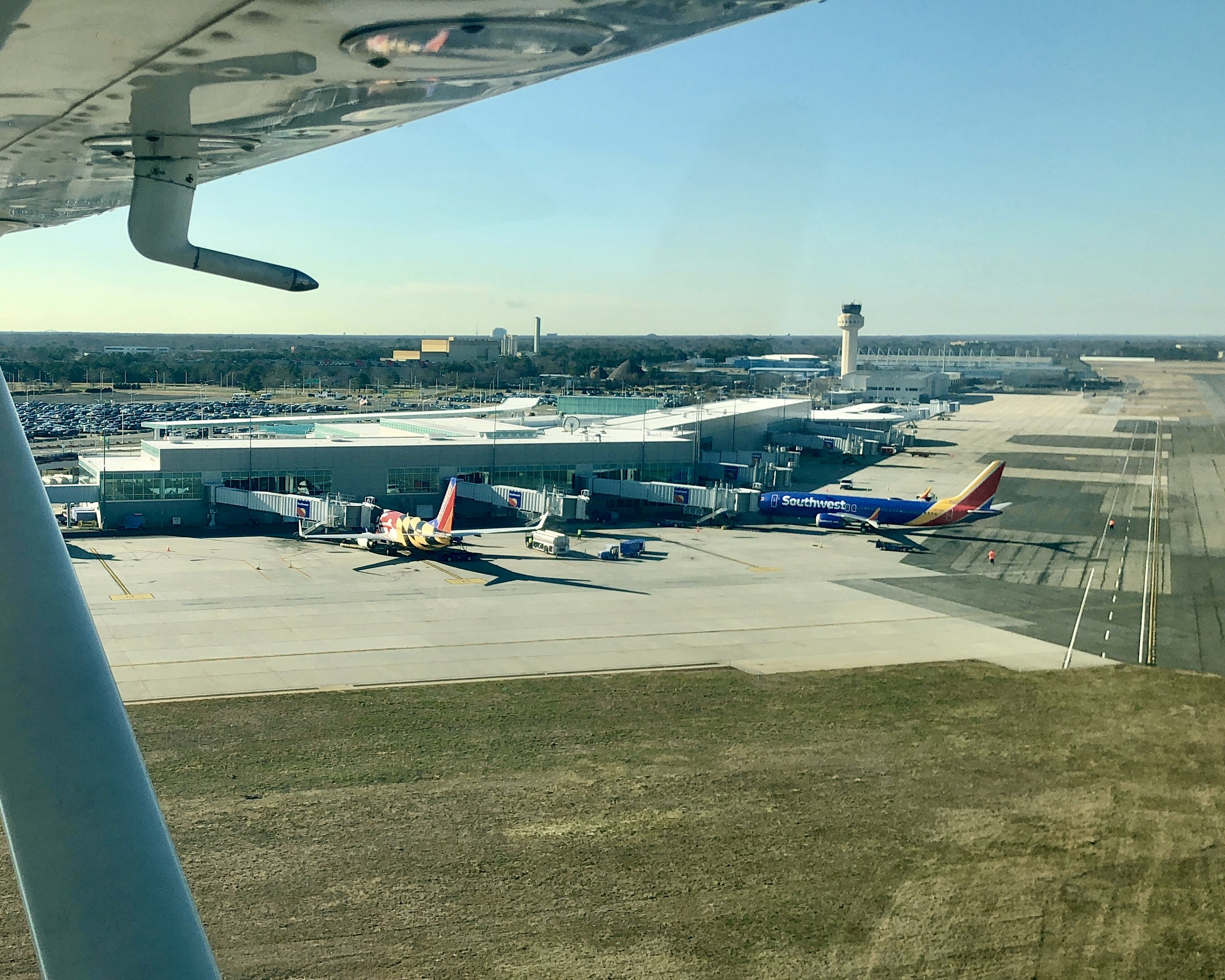
Long Island MacArthur Airport in 2018

Long Island MacArthur Airport is located within Ronkonkoma. The airport, owned by the Town of Islip and maintained by the Town of Islip Department of Aviation, is one of three commercial airports on Long Island – the other two being LaGuardia Airport and John F. Kennedy International Airport in the New York City borough of Queens – and, moreover, a primary commercial airport for Long Island.

Additionally, the New York Air Route Traffic Control Center is located at the airport.

==== Road ====
Two state-maintained highways pass through and serve Ronkonkoma:

- Long Island Expressway (I-495)
- Veterans Memorial Highway (NY 454)

Other major roads within Ronkonkoma include Johnson Avenue, Lakeland/Ocean/Rosevale Avenues (CR 93), Lincoln Avenue, the Long Island Motor Parkway (CR 67), Pond Road, Railroad Avenue, Smithtown Avenue, and Terry Road.

==== Rail ====
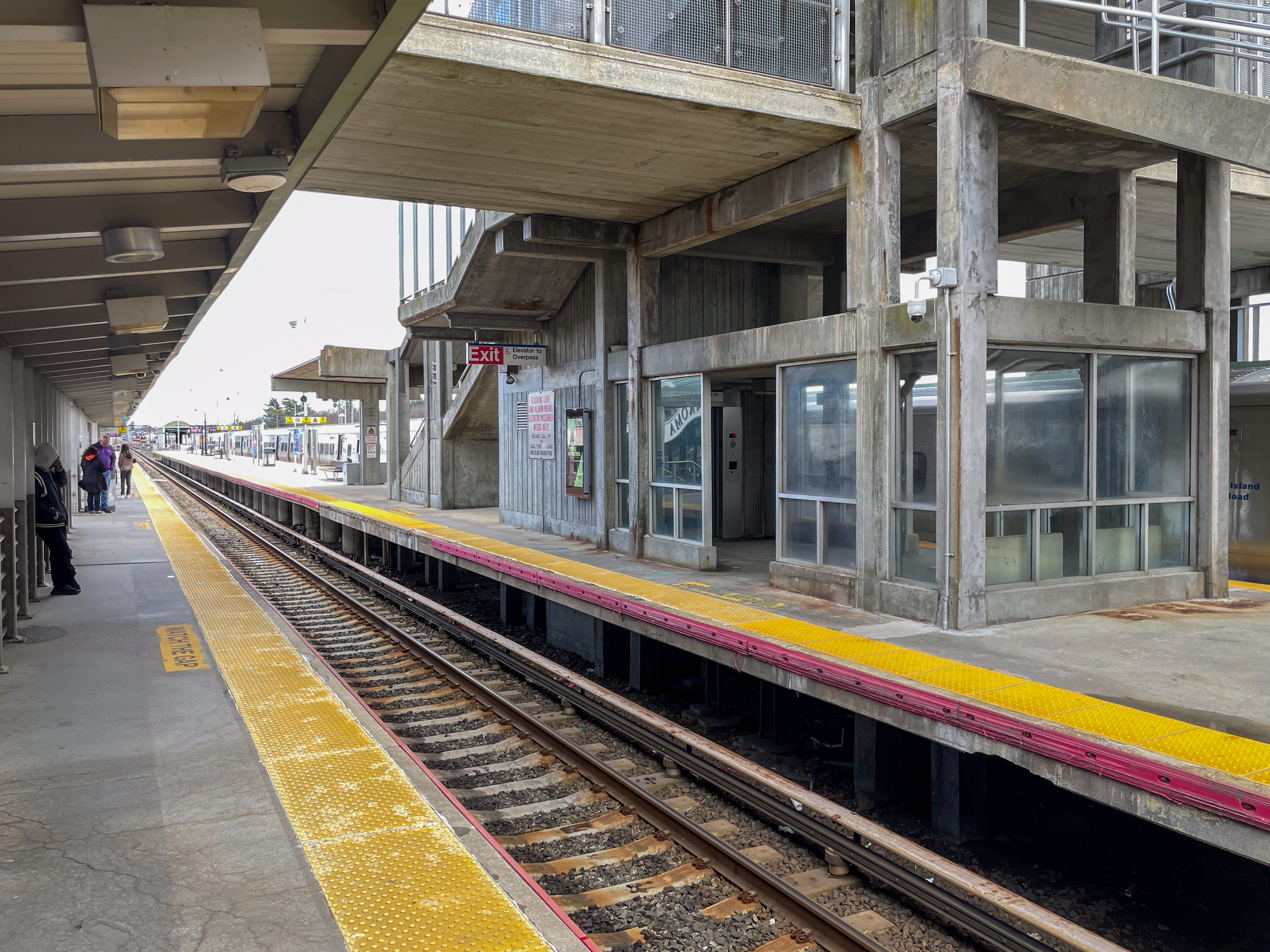
The Ronkonkoma station in 2024

The Ronkonkoma station on the Long Island Rail Road's Ronkonkoma Branch – one of the busiest stations on the LIRR – is partially located within Ronkonkoma.

In 2025, it was announced that Amtrak's Northeast Regional service will eventually begin serving the community, terminating at the Ronkonkoma station. Service is expected to commence in 2028.

==== Bus ====
Ronkonkoma is served by Suffolk County Transit bus routes 6, 51, 52A, 52B, and Long Island Express Bus.

=== Utilities ===
==== Natural gas ====
National Grid USA provides natural gas to homes and businesses that are hooked up to natural gas lines in Ronkonkoma.

==== Power ====
PSEG Long Island provides power to all homes and businesses within Ronkonkoma.

==== Sewage ====
Ronkonkoma is primarily not connected to any sanitary sewers – spare for the Nob Hill development near the hamlet's northwestern corner. Accordingly, the overwhelming majority of Ronkonkoma relies on cesspools and septic systems.

==== Water ====
The water supply system in Ronkonkoma is operated by the Suffolk County Water Authority.

== Notable people ==
- Stefanie DeLeo – Author and playwright.
- Keith Detelj – Soccer player.
- Joe Grimaldi – Ice hockey player.
- Steve Hass – Musician/music producer.
- Joe Jones – Basketball coach.
- Moira Kelly – Actress; grew up in Ronkonkoma.
- Lennon Murphy – Singer-songwriter.
- Joseph Raffaele – Religious leader; founder of the American Orthodox Catholic Church - Western Rite Mission, Diocese of New York.
- Scott Rudolph – Entrepreneur.
- Thorgy Thor (né Shane Galligan) – Drag queen, violinist.
- Alexis Weik, New York state senator; former Islip Receiver of Taxes.

== In popular culture ==
- In The Oh, Hello Show, John Mulaney's character George St. Geegland wrote a book called Next Stop: Ronkonkoma. The book is the story of 100 people on a train on Long Island. The book is written from 100 different perspectives, and is more than 1,000 pages long.
- In the season 7 episode of How I Met Your Mother entitled "The Drunk Train", Barney says "I was all, 'do I look like I'm from Ronkonkoma?'"
- Ronkonkoma is referenced in Law and Order Special Victims Unit, (Season 16xE11: "Agent Provocateur"), where a character states she lives in Ronkonkoma.
- Ronkonkoma is referenced in two songs by singer/songwriter Mike Doughty: "Busting Up a Starbucks" and "Like a Luminous Girl."
- Ronkonkoma was referenced by Artie Lange during the March 3, 2009, taping of the Late Show with David Letterman. The comic recounted a story of sitting in front of a fan at Yankees games who repeatedly cheered on Derek Jeter by shouting, "Do it for Ronkonkoma!" to which Lange replied "No one's doing anything for Ronkonkoma!"
- George Burns mentioned Ronkonkoma on an episode of The George Burns and Gracie Allen Show; coincidentally, Burns often performed in Ronkonkoma early in his career.
- Edith Bunker mentioned Ronkonkoma in the "Archie is Jealous" episode of All in the Family.
- Paul Buchman mentions Ronkonkoma in an episode of Mad About You.
- The National Hockey League's New York Islanders' 2024–25 Schedule Release video is hosted by a man named "Ronald Konkoma" – a play on the community's name.
- Only Murders in the Building mentions Ronkonkoma in Season 4 Episode 8 "Lifeboat" in reference to a film project named "Project Ronkonkoma".
