= High Speed Rail Alliance =

U.S. passenger rail advocacy group

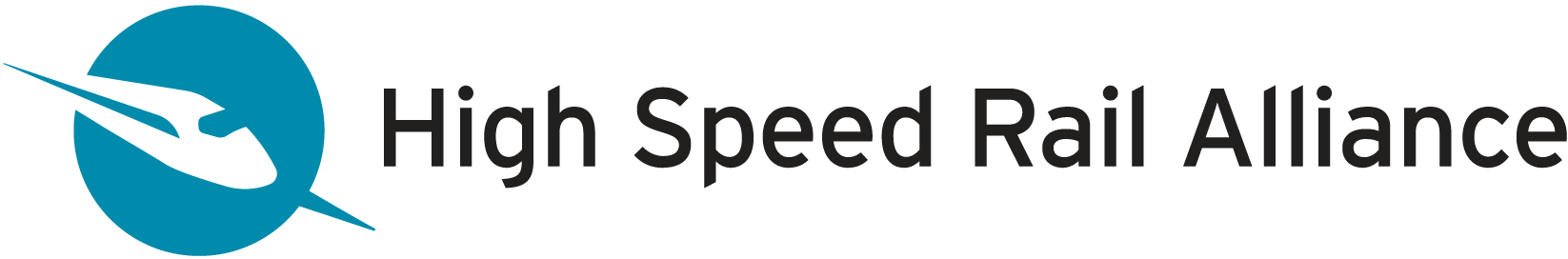
- Founded: 1993
- Type: Non-profit
- Location: Chicago, Illinois United States
- Region served: United States
- Key people: Richard Harnish, Executive Director
- Website: hsrail.org

Logo of the Midwest High Speed Rail Association

The High Speed Rail Alliance (HSRA) (until late 2019, named the Midwest High Speed Rail Association (MHSRA)) was founded in 1993 and is based in Chicago, Illinois. The association is a non-profit, member-supported organization that primarily advocates for world-class 220-mph high-speed trains linking major cities and supports fast, frequent and dependable trains on other routes that connect with 220-mph corridors to form a modern national rail network.

The High Speed Rail Alliance's executive director, Richard Harnish, believes it is time for America to “catch up” with European and Asian countries in terms of using high-speed rail systems.

The association is an active member of fourbillion.com, a coalition of advocacy organizations that worked to secure a $4 billion appropriation in 2010 for high-speed rail in the U.S. The effort began after the US House of Representatives passed a bill that included $4 billion for high-speed rail. The Senate cut the allocation down to $1.2 billion in their version. The two bills were in a conference committee. In June 2009, The High Speed Rail Alliance released a transportation engineering study of a 220-mph rail corridor in the Midwest. The 220-mph high-speed link would cut the trip from Chicago to St. Louis to 1 hour and 52 minutes and also serve O'Hare International Airport as well as key Illinois business, university and government centers in Kankakee, Champaign, Decatur, Springfield and Edwardsville. The line would cost between 12 billion and 13 billion dollars.

The HSRA views the Chicago-St. Louis link as the first of a regional 220-mph high-speed rail network that would link Chicago, St. Louis, the Twin Cities, Milwaukee, Detroit, Indianapolis, Cincinnati, Cleveland, Columbus and Pittsburgh, putting more than 35 million people within a three-hour train ride of Chicago.

In a proposal to the U.S. Department of Transportation, SNCF, operator of the TGV high-speed rail network in France, estimated that a Midwestern 220-mph high-speed rail network would create 677,000 permanent jobs and 316,000 construction jobs. Automobile trips would be reduced by 4.3 billion vehicle miles each year, saving 3 million barrels of oil each year, and additionally reduce CO_{2} and other pollutant emissions by 1.4 million tons in 2030. The total estimated cost for the network is $68.5 billion. Advocates for high-speed rail put that cost in perspective by pointing out that the Interstate Highway System cost 450 billion in 2008 dollars.

The High Speed Rail Alliance has been a vocal critic of libertarian and conservative activists who view HSRA as distorting the record and facts on high-speed rail. In July 2009, it released a document responding to statements by the Cato Institute and the Reason Foundation about high-speed rail.

== See also ==
- Chicago Hub Network
