= Brookhaven Airport =

Brookhaven Calabro Airport
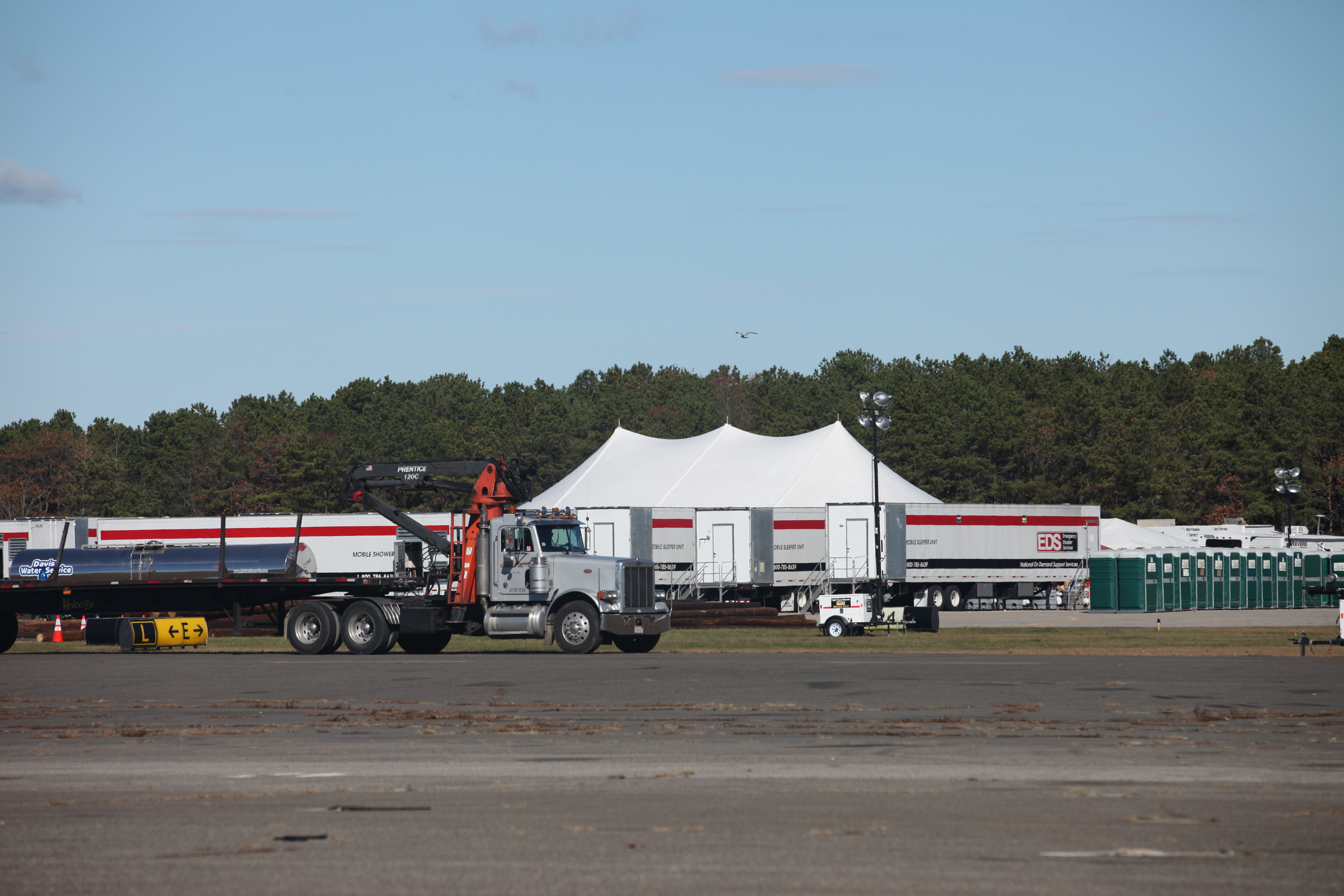
- FEMA used the airport as a staging area after Hurricane Sandy in 2012.
- IATA: WSH; ICAO: KHWV; FAA LID: HWV

Summary
- Airport type: Public
- Owner: Town of Brookhaven
- Location: Shirley, New York
- Elevation AMSL: 81 ft (25 m)
- Coordinates: 40°49′19″N 072°52′01″W
- Website: HWV website

Maps
- FAA airport diagram
- Interactive map of Brookhaven Calabro Airport

Runways
Direction	Length		Surface
Direction	ft	m	Surface
6/24	4,201	1,280	Asphalt
15/33	4,222	1,287	Asphalt/concrete

Statistics (2017)
- Aircraft operations: 54,384
- Based aircraft: 177
- Source: Federal Aviation Administration

Brookhaven Calabro Airport (IATA: WSH, ICAO: KHWV, FAA LID: HWV) is a public airport located one mile (1.6 km) north of the central business district of Shirley, in Suffolk County, New York, United States. This airport is publicly owned by the Town of Brookhaven.

Although most U.S. airports use the same three-letter location identifier for the FAA and IATA, Brookhaven Airport is assigned HWV by the FAA and WSH by the IATA. The airport's ICAO identifier is KHWV.

== History ==
Brookhaven Airport was constructed during World War II to provide logistical support for U.S. Army Air Corps operations. Known as Mastic Flight Strip, the title of the airport was transferred to New York State after the war. In 1961 the airport was acquired by the Town of Brookhaven. It was renamed in 1991 in honor of Dr. Frank Calabro, an important figure in the airport's development.

== Facilities and aircraft ==
Brookhaven Airport covers an area of 630 acres (2.6 km^{2}) which contains two runways:

- Runway 6/24: 4,201 x 100 ft. (1,280 x 30 m), surface: asphalt
- Runway 15/33: 4,222 x 150 ft. (1,287 x 46 m), surface: asphalt/concrete

For 12-month period ending December 31, 2017, the airport had 54,384 aircraft operations, an average of 149 per day: 99% general aviation, and <1% military. There were 177 aircraft based at this airport: 165 single engine, 6 multi engine, 1 helicopter, and 5 gliders.

Defunct Dowling College used to operate at Brookhaven Airport. Its School of Aviation offered bachelor's degrees in Aerospace Systems Technology and Aviation Management, and it participated in the FAA Air Traffic Control Collegiate Training Initiative (AT-CTI).

== See also ==
- List of airports in New York
