= Romano Volta =

Italian businessman (born 1937)

- Born: 15 February 1937 (age 89); Bologna, Italy
- Education: University of Bologna (Electronic engineering)
- Occupations: Executive chairman, Datalogic
- Awards: Cavaliere del Lavoro, 1997

Romano Volta (born 1937 February 15 ) is an Italian businessman who is the executive chairman and founder of Datalogic, an Italian company manufacturing barcode readers, mobile computers, radio-frequency identification, sensors for detection, and other electronic equipment.

== Early life ==
Born in Bologna, Romano Volta graduated with a degree in electronic engineering cum laude from the University of Bologna.

In the early 1970s, after a period as a professor at the Aldini Valeriani Technical Institute, Volta was a junior assistant to professor Giuseppe Evangelisti at the University of Bologna, at the heart of what is known as the "Packaging Valley", where most of the Italian companies that produce packaging machines are based. Professor Evangelisti was asked by some entrepreneurs to develop electronic optical devices to automate specific verification processes such as the centering of brands on packaging, the positioning of print, or the presence of a tablet in a blister pack.

Volta was put in charge of this task and began to develop a new device called a "color mark reader" to detect slight differences in contrast on packaging material; this device is still installed today in all packaging machines.

His ability to combine optics with electronics, providing check processing and verification equipment electronically integrated into the machine in a unique solution, quickly made Volta well known in the sector. He then founded a company called "Datalogic Optic Electronics".

Some years later, with the introduction of bar code systems, Volta began the development of the optical devices that became known as barcode readers.

== Datalogic Optic Electronics ==
Having started the development of barcode readers, Volta left his position at the University of Bologna to focus on his business initiative. He transferred from a small laboratory to a factory based in Lippo di Calderara, near the Bologna airport. In 1972, Datalogic was officially founded.

In 1974, at a Marsh supermarket in Troy, Ohio, a pack of Wrigley's chewing gum was the first retail product sold using a counter-top barcode scanner, the Magellan Model-A (now exhibited at the Smithsonian Museum in Washington, D.C.) by PSC, a company later acquired by Datalogic.

In the 1980s, Datalogic established itself as one of the major European companies for industrial applications, manufacturing the first industrial scanner in 1978. Datalogic also pioneered the design of baggage handling systems for airports, installing the first scanner at Milan's Linate Airport in 1984.

Today, Datalogic is an international company, quoted on the FTSE Italia STAR segment of the Italian stock exchange as DAL.MI. since 2001.

== Other ventures ==
Volta is President of Aczon Srl, a company founded in 2001 that operates in the fields of pharmaceutical research, biotechnology, and oncology; Chairman of Hydra S.p.A, an industrial holding company owned by the Volta family; and majority shareholder of Datalogic S.p.A; with additional interests in the real estate and financial fields.

From September 1998 to October 2004, he served as President of the Associazione Industriali (Industrial Association) of Bologna, and he was a member of the board of directors of Sanpaolo IMI Fondi Chiusi SGR S.p.A.

- Member of the Confindustria National Council
- Member and Deputy Chairman of the Steering Committee of the Cassa di Risparmio Foundation in Bologna
- Vice President of the Emilia-Romagna group of the Cavaliere del Lavoro
- Member of the Advisory Council of the Johns Hopkins University of Bologna
- Member of the board of directors of the Marconi Society
- Member of the board of directors of IMA S.p.A in Ozzano dell'Emilia (BO), a company operating in pharmaceutical packaging machines
- President of the electrotechnical and electronic production section of Unindustria (Industrialist and Enterprises Association) Bologna.

From 1 June 2018, he has been President of the Confindustria Emilia "Electronics and Mechatronics" supply chain for the four-year period 2018–2022.

He was president of the Fortitudo Basket team in the 1998–99 season.

== Awards and acknowledgements ==
On 29 May 1997, he was awarded the title of "Cavaliere del Lavoro" by the President of the Italian Republic.

According to Harvard Business Review in 2016, Volta was listed in 48th place in a list of the top-performing Italian CEOs.

== Personal life ==
Romano Volta is married, with three children. He is passionate about boating and skiing.
