= Silicon Prairie =

Nickname for several places in the US

The Silicon Prairie, a take on the Silicon Valley, can refer to one of several places in the United States including: the Dallas–Fort Worth area in Texas, the Chicago and Champaign-Urbana areas in Illinois, and Madison, Wisconsin. Silicon Prairie is also a reference to a multi-state region loosely comprising parts of Indiana, Minnesota, Wisconsin, Iowa, Missouri, Nebraska, Oklahoma and Kansas.

== Dallas–Fort Worth Silicon Prairie ==
North Texas's Silicon Prairie refers to north Dallas and Dallas and Fort Worth's northern suburbs, all part of the Dallas–Fort Worth metroplex. It is named for the high concentration of semiconductor manufacturing, telecommunications, and other information technology related companies in the area.

Dallas–Fort Worth area business in these industry sectors include:

- Active Network, LLC (Dallas)
- Alcatel-Lucent (Richardson)
- Armor Defense (Richardson)
- AT&T (Dallas)
- Cisco (Richardson)
- CommScope (Richardson)
- CompuCom (Dallas)
- CSC (Fort Worth)
- Corelogic (Irving, Texas)
- Cyrix Corporation (Richardson)
- Dealertrack Technologies (Dallas)
- Dell Services (Plano)
- Diodes Incorporated (Plano)
- Electronic Data Systems (EDS) (Plano)
- Entrust (Addison)
- Ericsson (Richardson)
- Flying Horse Solutions (Dallas)
- Fujitsu Network Communications (Richardson)
- GameStop (Grapevine)
- Hotels.com (Dallas)
- Headstorm (Addison)
- HP Enterprise Services (Plano)
- i2 Technologies (Irving)
- Intuit (Plano)
- Match.com (Dallas)
- McKesson Corporation (Irving)
- Microsoft (Irving)
- Motorola (Dallas)
- NEC America (Irving)
- Nokia (Irving)
- Nortel (Richardson)
- NQ Mobile (Dallas)
- Okmetic (Allen)
- PivotPoint Solutions (Plano)
- RadioShack (Fort Worth)
- Raytheon (Plano)
- BlackBerry Limited [formerly Research in Motion (RIM)] (Irving)
- Rockwell Collins (Richardson)
- SoftLayer (Dallas)
- StreamVenue, LLC (McKinney, Texas)
- Texas Instruments (Dallas)
- Thursby Software (Arlington)
- Travelocity (Southlake)
- Tyler Technologies (Plano)
- Verizon Communications (Irving)
- Huawei (Plano)
- ZTE (Richardson)
- Wistron (McKinney)

The Telecom Corridor in Richardson is usually considered the birthplace of the North Texas Silicon Prairie, with Texas Instruments and University of Texas at Dallas dating back to the 1960s. There are also a large number of recognized video and computer game developers in the area, known as the Dallas Gaming Mafia, including Gearbox Software, id Software, 3D Realms, Nerve Software, Bonfire Studios/Zynga Dallas, and Ensemble Studios. These videogame studios, especially Gearbox Software, helped get public interest and municipal funding for the National Videogame Museum to make its home in Frisco.

== Illinois Silicon Prairie ==
The Illinois Silicon Prairie typically refers to the Chicago and Champaign/Urbana areas.

The Chicago Metropolitan Area is home to several companies in the industrial automation, consumer electronics, telecommunications, and online services industries. The Illinois Technology and Research Corridor along Interstate 88 and the Golden Corridor along Interstate 90 have particularly high concentrations of such businesses.

Among the Chicago area companies and organizations that comprise the Illinois Silicon Prairie are:

- 1871 (River North, Chicago)
- Alcatel-Lucent (Naperville)
- Amada America (Schaumburg)
- Anixter (Glenview)
- CDW (Lincolnshire)
- Cisco (Chicago)
- Classified Ventures (Chicago)
- CommScope (Joliet, Illinois)
- Continental Automotive Systems (Deer Park)
- Enova International (Chicago)
- FANUC Robotics America Corporation (Hoffman Estates)
- Groupon (Chicago)
- GrubHub (Chicago)
- Guaranteed Rate (Chicago)
- HighGround (Chicago)
- Hostway (Chicago)
- LiveText (LaGrange)
- Molex (Lisle)
- Mori Seiki USA/DMG (Hoffman Estates)
- Motorola Mobility (Chicago)
- Motorola Solutions (Schaumburg)
- Northrop Grumman Electronic Systems (Rolling Meadows)
- Omron (Schaumburg)
- Orbitz (Chicago)
- Panasonic Corporation (Buffalo Grove)
- Rand McNally (Skokie)
- Schneider Electric (Palatine)
- Shure (Niles)
- Tellabs (Naperville)
- Trunk Club (River North, Chicago)
- Underwriters Laboratories (Northbrook)
- USRobotics (Schaumburg)
- Westell (Aurora)
- WMS Gaming (Waukegan)
- Zebra Technologies (Lincolnshire)

Much of the high technology industry base in the Champaign–Urbana metropolitan area consists of research and small start-up companies working with the University of Illinois at Urbana–Champaign. Seven Fortune 500 companies have research entities at the university's research park located in Champaign. The National Center for Supercomputing Applications is in Urbana.

== Midwest Silicon Prairie ==
An area of the Midwestern United States is often referred to as the Silicon Prairie. This region can loosely be defined as the states bordering along Interstate 29 in the Upper Midwest; mainly Missouri, Indiana, Iowa, Kansas, South Dakota, and Nebraska.

=== Gateway ===
Computer company Gateway 2000 and several other companies began using the moniker in the mid-1990s in advertisements and promotional materials.

=== Paycom ===
Founded in Oklahoma City in 1998, Paycom is one of the first online payroll and HR technology providers, recognized by Fortune magazine in 2020 as one of the fastest-growing publicly traded companies in the world. They also operate a secondary facility in Dallas, and broke ground on a new operations center in Grapevine in 2019.

=== Silicon Prairie Communications (prairie.net) - ISP and regional BBS ===
Founded in 1992, Silicon Prairie Communications started as a regional BBS and UUCP gateway, expanding to a boutique ISP that still serves as the delegated admin for a large group of .us domain localities, both regionally in Iowa and several large metro cities.

=== Silicon Prairie News ===
In 2008, the online technology and entrepreneurial news publication Silicon Prairie News was founded to highlight achievements of companies in the region's principal cities such as Des Moines, Kansas City, St. Louis, Omaha, Sioux Falls and any adjacent cities.

=== Silicon Prairie Portal & Exchange d/b/a Silicon Prairie Online ===
In 2016, the MNvest portal operator Silicon Prairie Online received registration approval from the Minnesota Department of Commerce to commence operations as a JOBS Act approved crowdfunding portal operator.

=== Iowa Governor Culver ===
In 2009, Governor Chet Culver (D-Iowa) used the term to describe his desired future reputation for his state after their investment in wind and other renewable energy industries.

=== ISU Research Park ===
Ames, Iowa

Workiva - An Ames, Iowa-based business enterprise software company. In 2016 Workiva received the Technology Association of Iowa's Prometheus Award for Top Growth Company of the Year.

=== Des Moines ===
Dwolla - A mobile payment company, whose business model includes speeding up business to business and business to consumer transactions and payments.

=== Nebraska Angels ===
An Omaha-based group of approximately 60 investors who fund local start-ups.

=== South Dakota ===
Property Meld is a Rapid City-based SaaS startup that streamlines maintenance coordination for property management companies across the US and Canada.
