= Peachtree =

Peachtree, peach tree or variations may refer to:

- Peach, the fruit-bearing tree, Prunus persica

== Places ==
- Peachtree, North Carolina
- Peachtree, West Virginia
- Peachtree City, Georgia, a southern suburb of Atlanta
- Peachtree Corners, Georgia, a northern suburb of Atlanta

=== Transportation places ===
- Peachtree Center station, a MARTA subway station in Atlanta
- Peachtree station, Amtrak train station in Atlanta
- Peachtree station (Atlanta Streetcar), a stop on the Atlanta streetcar
- Peachtree Street, a major street in Atlanta

== Products and business ==
- Peachtree Accounting, business management software by now known as Sage 50 Accounting
- Peachtree Financial Solutions, a financial services company
- Peachtree schnapps liqueur, manufactured by De Kuyper Royal Distillers
- Peachtree TV, on-air branding of Atlanta station WPCH-TV

== Other uses ==
- Peachtree Road Race, a 10 kilometer footrace in Atlanta
