= Secondary market annuity =

Secondary market annuity is a where an owner of an annuity sells it to a third party in exchange for a lump sum. The effect is that the seller swaps a stream of periodic payments for a immediate lump sum payment. The initial holder of the annuity may have received a structured settlement through a court settlement, insurance claim, or other means but wants or needs immediate liquidity.

The annuity is typically sold at a discount, meaning the buyer pays less than the total value of the future payments. This discount reflects the time value of money and provides a potential yield advantage for the buyer. There may also be tax advantages for the buyer who is typically in investor.

Some salespeople call the investment in an annuity based on a structured settlement a secondary market annuity. This is a misnomer as it may not meet the definition of annuity under the insurance law for many states and therefore does not enjoy the statutory protections, which is a risk for the buyer. In the United States, The National Association of Insurance Commissioners states that when the ownership of structured settlement payment rights is transferred by a Qualified Order, the ownership of the actual insurance product, the structured settlement annuity, does not change hands.

The US association of state regulators of insurance (including annuities) issued its Statutory Issue Paper No. 160 in 2019 which makes clear that the acquisition of structured settlement payment rights is a not an annuity or an insurance product.

== History ==
Initially structured settlement payments rights were primarily packaged up by large buyers such as JG Wentworth, securitized and sold to institutional investors. During a period where institutional capital became less available in the immediate aftermath of the 2008 financial crisis, a number of intermediaries began marketing structured settlement payment rights to investors. Some began to use labels that included the term "annuity", such as in force annuities, secondary market annuity, secondary market annuities, secondary market income annuity and/or the acronyms SMA or SMIA, despite the fact that these were not annuities and that many of the people marketing these instruments did not even hold insurance licenses. Some make reference to State Insurance Guarantee Funds of which the mere mention in connection with the sale or solicitation of a legitimate regulated annuity would be unlawful.

Most states in the US have, as part of their insurance laws, an advertising prohibition which specifies that insurance companies and insurance agents may not use the existence of the guaranty association for the purpose of sales, solicitation, or inducement to purchase insurance, including annuity contracts Some states such as Connecticut and Tennessee have or have pending legislation to specifically exclude investors in structured settlement payment rights from guaranty fund protection.

As of March 11, 2022, 34 states in the US had adopted the 2017 Revisions to the Life and Health Guaranty Association Model Act #520) which expressly exclude factored structured settlement payment streams from their state guaranty association insolvency schemes. On November 30, 2021, the NAIC Receivership and Insolvency (E) Task Force adopted a draft memorandum that encourages state insurance departments to review their receivership and guaranty fund laws to ensure they address: (i) conflicts of law between the guaranty fund law or the provisions of any other law; (ii) continuation of coverage; (iii) priority of distribution of estate assets; (iv) full faith and credit stays and injunctions; (v) the 2021 revisions to the Holding Company Models; (vi) treatment of workers’ compensation large deductible policies; and (vii) the 2017 revisions to the Life and Health Insurance Guaranty Association Model Act (#520).According to the Task Force, the above have been identified as critical for states’ laws with respect to multi-jurisdictional receivership

== Structured settlement annuity ==
When structured settlements are established, there is none of the transactional risk of investing in factored structured settlement payments. A stark example of transactional risk is the Wall case. On April 30, 2019, a judge in the matter of Robert Wall and Linda Wall vs Corona Capital, LLC and Altium Group, LLC, granted summary judgment in favor of Altium Group.

Altium Group LLC was an intermediary that had a relationship with the originating company Corona Capital and made the deal originated by Corona Capital available to its network of agents and advisors. The Walls were retirees, who invested $152,833.37 in a deal that was approved by a Florida state court March 28, 2012. The original annuitant Kenneth Stevens subsequently discovered a fraud in the origination. Stevens had filed papers seeking to overturn the order and, "after extensive discovery", the court concluded that Stevens "did not sign any of the documents submitted to this Court in support of the Corona petition. In other words, his signature had been forged. Stevens successfully sued to vacate the Order approving the transfer of payment rights.

The Walls subsequently sued Corona Capital, LLC and Altium Group, LLC. The Court ruled that the Walls could not sue the finance company for breach of transfer warranties under the Uniform Commercial Code but may sue the intermediary seller (Altium Group LLC) receiving her investment for breach of contract". While initially successful on the breach of contract claim, the ruling was overturned in favor of Altium on appeal, leaving only an unjust enrichment claim to be contested. As things stood on April 30, 2019, the Walls invested $152,833.37 in 2012 and have lost their entire investment and incurred substantial legal fees. Altium Group's website continued to tout "Unparalleled Safety of Principal" in solicitation to investors for a considerable time after the Wall transaction. Other examples of matters related to transactional risk appear in Unsettling Events Section below.

Primary market structured settlement payees may have statutory protections in the event of carrier insolvencies, however that may not be case with investments in factored structured settlement payment streams. In January 2019, the Tennessee legislature introduced House and Senate bills excluding from coverage under the Tennessee Life and Health Insurance Guaranty Association Act a person who acquires rights to receive payments through a structured settlement factoring transaction, as defined in federal law, regardless of whether the transaction occurred before or after the federal law took effect.

Primary structured settlements are shielded from creditors in accordance with their statutory protections. An investment in factored structured settlement payment streams does not have this protection. It then becomes like any other investment and is open to the rights and claims of creditors, bankruptcy trustees and other claimants.

== Lack of regulation of sales practices ==
Originators of structured settlement derivatives that end up being labeled "secondary market annuities" are currently not subject to any uniform federal licensing standard. With few exceptions—such as Maryland, which requires registration and bonding—many of the salespeople and companies that originate the derivative cash flows being sold to investors are not licensed or registered in the states where they solicit customers.

A number of sellers of structured settlement derivatives who do hold active insurance licenses have nevertheless continued to mislabel them as "secondary market annuities." Some have even implied coverage by state guaranty funds—despite explicit prohibitions in state insurance laws. For example, New York's Insurance Law Section 7718 prohibits such misrepresentations.

== Potential risks to investors ==
Absent most of the sales pitches for "secondary market "annuities" is mention of transactional risk, the possibility that a structured settlement transfer order can be later vacated and result in suspension of payments and possibly the loss of the entire investment. Following the Maryland Attorney General's lawsuit against Access Funding and several associated defendants, servicers of structured settlement payment rights notified certain investors with Somerset Wealth Strategies that their payments were being suspended pending the outcome of the litigation. This does not happen when one buys a legitimate annuity. In April 2010, Somerset Consulting established and continues to operate a website called Secondary Market Annuities that since December 2016 underscores that factored structured settlements are not annuities. On August 19, 2017, Somerset CEO Thomas Burgess Hamlin issued an update to investors' Maryland Attorney General lawsuit against Access Funding, et al. ("the Lawsuit") in which he stated "An important difference is that the plaintiffs in the class action are trying to recover damages from Access Funding, but not to void the orders approving transfers of payments. The class action (another action against Access Funding) therefore would not affect the payments to which you are entitled". Oral arguments were heard in the appeal of the Attorney General's case, in March 2019. In the meantime buyers of structured settlement derivatives that were marketed as "secondary market annuities" by Somerset have not been receiving the income payments that they paid for. The Maryland Court of Special Appeals overturned the lower court decision in April 2019, leaving investors to remain in limbo with no payments. In September 2019 Thomas Burgess Hamlin settled a FINRA complaint against him for $50,000 from an investor who was sold a factored structured settlement payment stream that was mislabeled "secondary market annuity". In December 2019 a FINRA complaint against Brian Thomas Horn, a former employee of Somerset, allegedly involved in the same transaction settled the FINRA complaint against him for $55,000.

A Pittsburgh area couple paid $152,833.37 of their retirement money to Altium Group, a New Jersey intermediary, on the recommendation of their financial adviser under the Master Agreement but never received payments from Altium or Corona Capital. In November 2016, the United States District Court for the Western District of Pennsylvania pointed out that "[a]s a caution to those investing in these [structured settlement factoring transactions], a court can later vacate the sale of the ... payments when the underlying plaintiff selling his ... payments lacked authority to sell ... leaving the eventual investors without the purchased asset". The Wall Court issued an opinion January 12, 2017. See Footnotes 4 and 5 for status as of April 30, 2019 in which a legal decision essentially renders the Wall's investment worthless.

After years of advertising "Secondary Market Annuities as having "Unparalleled Safety of Principal" [see Footnote 7], in July 2017 Altium Group finally posted a product warning about "Secondary Market Annuities":

"Despite best efforts to comply with the SSPA (Structured Settlement Protection Act), Secondary Market Annuity transfers possess a risk of criminal fraud and violations that can be committed by any party involved in the transaction. As such, a Secondary Market Annuity may result in a reversal or vacation of its underlying court order if it is determined that the original sale was approved under false pretense. A Vacated or Reversed order would result in the termination of future annuity payments to the investor"

On September 1, 2017, Seneca One Finance filed a suit in Montgomery County MD against US Annuity Services, Inc. and Jeremy Wright, which raises a number of allegations that, if proven, could be grounds to overturn or vacate orders and impact investors.

1. USAS made a practice of having statutory disclosures signed at the same time as structured settlement transfer agreements and backdating the disclosure statements to make it appear as if the disclosure statement was prepared and delivered prior to the transfer agreement [Complaint at 61 p 14]
2. At least one USAS employee has created fake documentation about an annuitant's income in an effort to mislead a court into believing that the annuitant had other monthly income, thus increasing the chance that the transaction is approved [Complaint 64 p 14]
3. At least one USAS employee has altered a signed contract with an annuitant without the annuitant's permission [Complaint 66 p 15]
4. Upon information and belief at least one USAS employee has paid a third party to pose as a particular annuitant and falsely testify in court that she was the annuitant. [Complaint 67 p 15]

On September 14, 2017, a class action lawsuit filed in the Eastern District of Pennsylvania has the potential to impact both securitization and individual investors. The suit alleges Portsmouth, Virginia, Circuit Court judges were complicit in an "Annuity Fraud Enterprise" scheme, in which a Virginia lawyer and 79th District delegate, Steve Heretick, was the central figure, representing JG Wentworth, Seneca One, 321 Henderson Receivables and other settlement purchasers, that allegedly violated the rights of thousands of structured settlement annuitants. Plaintiffs allege violations of RICO statutes against multiple defendants, violations of right to due process an seek a constructive trust. against all defendants and all nominal defendants which include several life insurers who issue the annuities which fund the periodic payments that the investors believe they have acquired.

On August 8, 2018, a spokesman for DRB Capital, a prominent structured settlement factoring company backed by the Blackstone Group, said in a press release that "in DRB's opinion, a number of bad actors are engaged in illegal, unfair and abusive/deceptive behaviors and these firms have besieged legitimate companies and consumers in this market. We are committed to rooting them out and bringing them to justice. Sunshine is the best disinfectant and we intend to provide evidence unearthed by this program to relevant State Attorneys General, the IRS, and the CFPB. In addition we will use it in direct legal actions against these malefactors and the individuals responsible for this reprehensible conduct. Among the alleged illegal conduct described by DRB Capital is (1)violations of the internal revenue code section 5891; (2)violations of state structured settlement protection acts; (3)improper forum shopping; (4) suborning perjury by, among other things, making consumers execute affidavits containing false information about their residence and other matters; (5)violations of federal and state Deceptive and Unfair Trade Practices Acts and (6) DRB is seeking information on abusive and unfair trade practices including extortion behavior and practices against sellers

In re: Assignment of Certain Structured Settlement Payment Rights of James V McMillan is a 2018 legal proceeding in Sumter County, Florida, in which James McMillan, a victim of the October 15, 2003, Staten Island Ferry crash, seeks to rescind nine alleged forum shopped ex-parte structured settlement transfer orders. McMillan alleged that Seneca One, LLC, Structured Asset Funding and Settlement Capital Services Plus LLC engaged in civil theft, exploitation of the disabled and a systematic scheme to defraud McMillan and the Court in Sumter County. McMillan contends that at the urging of petitioners the court improperly exercised jurisdiction over McMillan, who lived in New York at all relevant times, and the court improperly exercised in rem jurisdiction over the structured settlement payment rights. McMillan contends that by entering orders without proper jurisdiction that the court inadvertently created a series of nullities, void orders that should be immediately vacated.

== See also ==
- Annuity (financial contracts)
- Structured settlement factoring transaction
- Endowment selling
