= IMA Life S.r.l =

IMA Life (previously known as IMA Edwards, Libra and BOC Edwards Pharmaceutical Systems) is one of the few companies which are prominent in the manufacturing of freeze dryers especially for the pharmaceutical and biotechnological companies, aseptic processing and filling solutions. It was previously owned by the BOC Group and then the Linde Group until recently when it was bought by the IMA Group based in Italy.

== Products ==
IMA Life's production range includes machines for vial washing and sterilising, filling and stoppering machines for aseptic environments, filling and closing machines for pharmaceuticals, microdosing machines for aseptic powder filling, labellers, blowing machines, depackers and tray loaders. IMA Life also offers freeze-drying technology: industrial, pilot and laboratory freeze dryers.

IMA Life designs, manufactures, installs and services integrated systems predominantly for the pharmaceutical primary packaging market. It has been in the market of freeze dryer manufacturing for more than 50 years. It specializes in the production of industrial freeze dryers (lyophilizers)and fully automated loading & unloading systems.

== Organization ==
IMA Life is one of the four main divisions of the IMA group. IMA has 4 divisions dedicated to business areas in the main packaging and processing sectors: IMA Flavour (Tea & Coffee Packaging Solutions), IMA Active Division (Solid Dose Solutions), IMA Life (Aseptic Processing & Freeze Drying Solutions) and IMA Safe (Packaging Solutions). The last three business areas also manage companies operating in their respective sectors.

The parent company, IMA is a multinational Italian company based in Bologna, Italy with a consolidated turnover of 505.8 million Euros.

IMA Life has 4 divisions:

- IMA Life North America Inc.
- IMA Life The Netherlands B.V.
- IMA Life (Beijing) Pharmaceutical Systems Co. Ltd.
- PharmaSiena S.r.l

== Production Sites ==
IMA Life has four production sites, one located in the outskirts of Bologna, one in Calenzano near Florence, one in Tonawanda, NY (USA) and one in Beijing (China). Apart from its manufacturing plants, it has sales and service centers at Puerto Rico, Brazil, France, Italy, Ireland, China and Japan.

== History ==
- 1919 F.D. Edwards establishes Edwards Equipment and Services in London, England.
- 1939 F.D. Edwards begins manufacturing vacuum equipment.
- 1955 The company acquires Alto Vuoto SpA, a freeze drying manufacturer in Italy.
- 1968 The company is acquired by BOC, after staying in private hands through the post-war period and until the 1960s when it went public.
- 1977 BOC Edwards acquire Kniese Apparatbau GmbH, a freeze drying manufacturer in Germany.
- 1992 Restructuring of Freeze Drying business resource centralised in Tonawanda (US).
- 1994 The company’s product portfolio is expanded with the acquisition of pharmaceutical filling systems from Calumatic in The Netherlands.
- 1995 The company’s portfolio is further expanded with loading systems introduced from the Dongen manufacturing site in The Netherlands.
- 2004 A joint venture is established with Tianli Cryogenic Company, a pharmaceutical freeze dryer manufacturer in Beijing, China.
- 2006 The BOC Group is acquired by Linde AG and together form The Linde Group. Linde sells the vacuum division of BOC Edwards. BOC Edwards Pharmaceutical Systems remains part of the Linde Group, as an independent division.
- 2008 IMA, Italy acquires the BOC Edwards Pharmaceutical Systems group creating IMA Edwards – a part of IMA Life division of the IMA group.
- 2010 Today the whole group has been renamed under the brand IMA LIFE - Aseptic Processing and Freeze Drying Solutions.

== Clients / Customers ==
Most of the clients are pharmaceutical and biotechnological companies which include
Pfizer, GlaxoSmithKline, AstraZeneca, Bristol-Myers Squibb, Novartis, Johnson & Johnson, Aventis, Eli Lilly, Roche, Abbott, Kaketsuken, Schering-Plough, Bayer, Pathéon, Takeda, Amgen, Schering-Plough AG, Wyeth, Baxter, Hemofarm, Genentech, Genzyme, DSM-Catalytica and Merck & Co.

== See also ==
IMA
