= Fortis College =

Private college in the United States

- Type: Private for-profit college
- Established: 2008
- Location: 32 campuses in the United States and online
- Website: www.fortis.edu

Fortis College (also Fortis Institute and Fortis College of Nursing in some locations) is a private for-profit college with campuses throughout the United States and online education. It was established in 2008 and is operated by Education Affiliates and owned by JLL Partners.

== Education Affiliates and JLL Partners ==
Education Affiliates (EA) operates Fortis College and Fortis Institute, and is headquartered in Nottingham, Maryland. EA is an investment of JLL Partners and was incorporated in 2004. Its other schools include ASPE Training, All-State Career School, DriveCo CDL Learning Center, Saint Paul's School of Nursing, Georgia Driving Academy, and the Denver College of Nursing.

== History ==
=== Growth (2008 to 2013) ===
From 2008 to 2013, Fortis College and Fortis Institutes grew from one school in Phoenix, Arizona to more than 40 schools in 17 states. Fortis purchased other for-profit schools including: Virginia Career Institute, Capps College, North Florida Institute, Medix School, AMTI, National Institute of Technology, RETS College, Gulf Coast College, Florida Career Institute, Technical Career Institute, Berdan Institute, Tri-State Business Institute, and MedVance Institute.

=== Downsizing (2013 to present) ===
Revenues:

- 2012-13: $253,193,698
- 2013-14: $235,792,358
- 2014-15: $210,264,921
- 2015-16: $196,007,578
- 2016-17: $193,271,039

Enrollment losses and unprofitability have resulted in campus closures in Florida, Maryland, Ohio, Pennsylvania. and Texas. These loses have been ameliorated by the transfer of students from other for-profit colleges that have closed their doors.

In 2015, Education Affiliates, the parent company of Fortis, "agreed to pay $13 million to the United States to resolve allegations that it violated the False Claims Act by submitting false claims to the Department of Education for federal student aid for students enrolled in its programs." Part of the $13 million settlement provided for repayment of $1.9 million that resulted from Education Affiliates "awarding federal financial aid to students at its Fortis-Miami campus based on invalid high school credentials issued by a diploma mill."

In 2016–17, 21 Fortis locations were unprofitable: Centerville, Cincinnati, Columbia, Cutler Bay, Cuyahoga Falls, Grand Prairie, Houston, Indianapolis, Norfolk, Phoenix, Richmond, Baltimore, Birmingham, Cookeville, Erie, Forty Fort, Lawrenceville, and Nashville.

In 2020 and 2021 Fortis received more than $50 million in stimulus funds.

- $32.6 million under the CARES Act
- $14.9 million under the second round of Coronavirus funds.
- $8.4 million (projected) under the American Rescue Plan.

At least a dozen locations are under US Department of Education heightened cash monitoring for financial irresponsibility.

== Academics ==
Fortis offers Associate of Art degrees and certificates.

=== Accreditation ===
Fortis Colleges and Fortis Institutes are institutionally accredited by the following institutional accreditors:

- Accrediting Bureau of Health Education Schools
- Accrediting Commission of Career Schools and Colleges
- Council on Occupational Education

Additionally, a number of Fortis Colleges and Institutes received institutional accreditation from the Accrediting Council for Independent Colleges and Schools (ACICS). ACICS lost recognition as an institutional accreditor from the Council for Higher Education Accreditation (CHEA) in 2017 and from the US Department of Education in 2022.

In September 2018, the Orange Park, Florida campus voluntarily withdrew from ACICS.

In April 2019, ACICS renewed Fortis' accreditation for its Norfolk, Virginia campus until September 30, 2019, but continued its compliance warning. According to ACICS, Fortis did not adequately maintain student records related to admissions and student progress.

== Faculty ==
Faculty at Fortis are primarily adjunct professors. The percentage of instructors that are full time range from 10 percent to 40 percent, depending on the campus. Fortis College in Mobile, Alabama has 3 full-time instructors and 34 part-time instructors. Fortis Institute in Wayne, New Jersey has 12 full-time instructors and 25 part-time instructors.

== Students ==
Fortis schools have racially and ethnically diverse student populations. The demographic breakdown of the Phoenix campus is 34 percent White, 34 percent Hispanic, 22 percent Black, 4 percent unknown, 2 percent American Indian/Alaska Native, 2 percent two or more races, 1 percent Native Hawaiian/Pacific Islander, and 1% Asian. The breakdown of the Cuyahoga Falls, Ohio campus are 56 percent White, 31 percent Black, 5 percent Asian, 4 percent unknown, 2percent two or more races, and 1 percent Hispanic.

== College costs and student outcomes ==
According to the US Department of Education's College Scorecard, the average annual cost of attending Fortis College ranges from $16,958 to 30,687.

- Fortis students have a graduation rate ranging from 29 to 72 percent, depending on the campus.
- Median salary after attending ranges from $24,100 to $33,200.
- Student loan repayment rates range from 20 to 24 percent.

=== Gainful employment ===
According to the Chronicle of Higher Education, the following programs failed gainful employment standards. In failing programs, graduates have loan payments exceeding 12 percent of total earnings or 30 percent of discretionary income.

- Centerville, OH: legal assistant/paralegal, AA
- Centerville, OH: criminal justice/safety studies, AA
- Centerville, OH: medical insurance specialist/medical biller, AA
- Centerville, OH: medical/clinical assistant, AA
- Norfolk, VA: criminal justice/safety studies, AA
- Norfolk, VA: health information/medical records technology/technician, AA
- Norfolk, VA: medical/clinical assistant, AA
- Erie, PA: computer graphics, AA
- Erie, PA: cosmetology/cosmetologist, Undergraduate certificate
- Erie, PA: barbering/barber, Undergraduate certificate
- Erie, PA: legal assistant/paralegal, AA
- Erie, PA: criminal justice/safety studies, AA
- Erie, PA: health information/medical records technology/technician, AA
- Erie, PA: medical/clinical assistant, AA
- Erie, PA: massage therapy/therapeutic message, AA
- Erie, PA: business administration and management, general, AA
- Erie, PA: accounting technology/technician and bookkeeping, AA
- Erie, PA: administrative assistant and secretarial science, general, AA

== Locations ==
=== Fortis College ===
- Dothan, AL (141 students)
- Mobile, AL (301 students)
- Montgomery, AL (264 students)
- Cutler Bay, FL (379 students)
- Orange Park, FL (442 students)
- Smyrna, GA (516 students)
- Indianapolis, IN (408 students)
- Baton Rouge, LA (387 students)
- Landover, MD (603 students)
- Centerville, OH (491 students)
- Cincinnati, OH (562 students)
- Cuyahoga Falls, OH (904 students)
- Westerville, OH (561 students)
- Columbia, SC (438 students)
- Houston, TX (327 students)
- Salt Lake City, UT (490 students)
- Norfolk, VA (441 students)
- Richmond, VA (455 students)

=== Fortis Institute ===
- Birmingham, AL (539 students)
- Pensacola, FL (668 students)
- Port St. Lucie, FL (481 students)
- Towson, MD (510 students)
- Lawrenceville, NJ (266 students)
- Wayne, NJ (479 students)
- Scranton, PA (241 students)
- Cookeville, TN (303 students)
- Nashville, TN (479 students)
- Houston, TX (300 students)

== Closed locations ==
- Tampa, Florida (2013)
- Jacksonville, Florida (2014)
- Miami, Florida (2014)
- Mulberry, Florida (2015)
- Largo, Florida (2016)
- Lauderdale Lakes, Florida (2016)
- Palm Springs, Florida (2016)
- Winter Park, Florida (2016)
- Erie, Pennsylvania (2018)
- Ravenna, Ohio (2018)
- Woodlawn, Maryland (2018)
- Grand Prairie, Texas (2019)
- Baltimore, Maryland
- Phoenix, Arizona (2019)
- Erie, Pennsylvania (2019)
- Foley, Alabama (2022)
- Forty Fort, Pennsylvania (2025)

== Department of Education heightened cash monitoring ==
The following Fortis schools are on US Department of Education heightened cash monitoring as of December 2018. Financial responsibility numbers are at the lowest level, -1.

- Fortis College, Cuyahoga Falls, OH
- Fortis Institute, Towson, MD
- Fortis Institute, Wayne, NJ
- Fortis College, Centerville, OH
- Fortis College, Mobile, AL
- Fortis Institute, Forty Fort, PA
- Fortis Institute, Scranton, PA
- Fortis College, Foley, AL
- Fortis College, Orange Park, FL
- Fortis College, Baton Rouge, LA
