= Datalogic =

Automatic data capture company

Datalogic S.p.A.

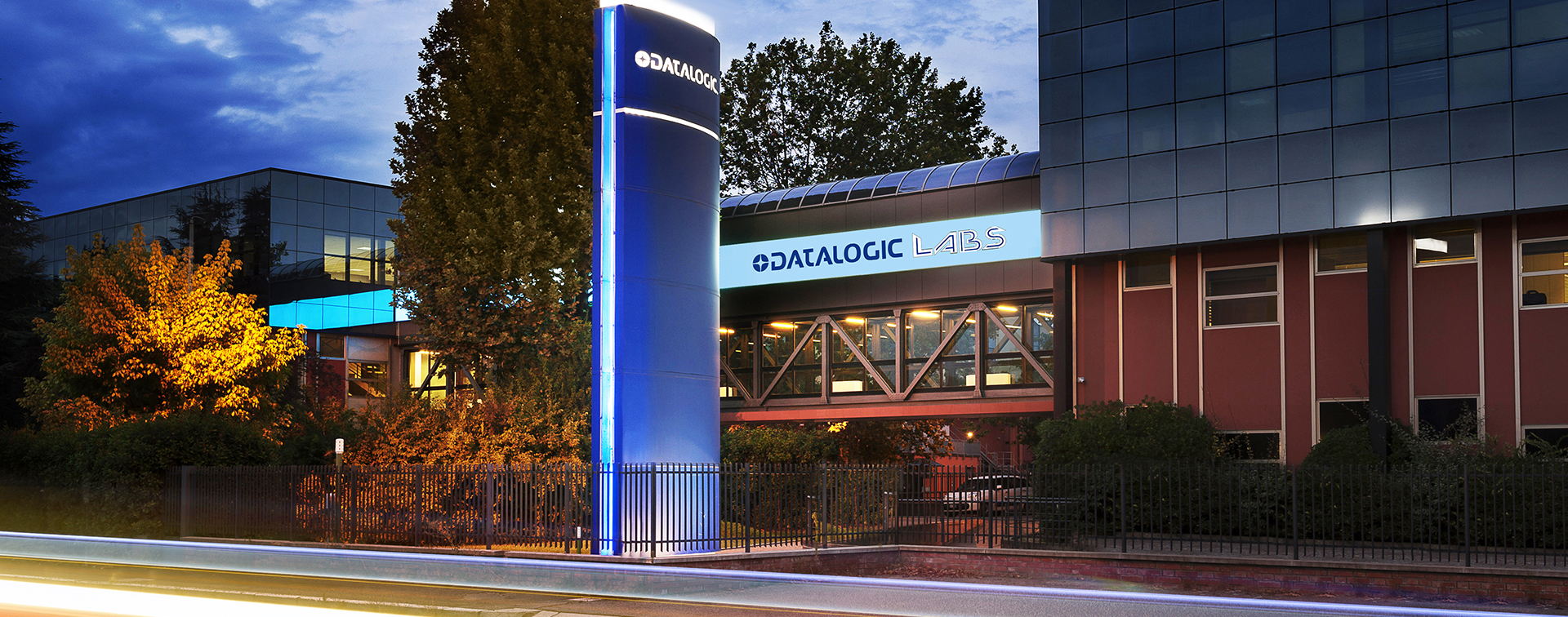
- Datalogic Labs headquarters in Lippo di Calderara di Reno (Bologna, Italy)
- Company type: Holding (joint-stock company)
- Traded as: BIT: DAL.MI
- Industry: Electronics
- Founded: 1972; 54 years ago
- Founder: Romano Volta
- Headquarters: Lippo di Calderara di Reno, Italy
- Products: Barcode readers and products for industrial automation
- Revenue: ▲€ 493.8 Million (FY 2024)
- Number of employees: 2750+ (FY 2024)
- Website: datalogic.com

Datalogic S.p.A. is an Italian company working in the automatic data capture and process automation markets. The group specializes in the design and production of barcode readers, mobile computers, radio-frequency identification, sensors for detection, measurement and safety, vision and laser marking systems. Datalogic products are used in many supermarkets and points of sale, at airports, at shipping and postal services, and in factories and hospitals worldwide.

In 2024 the company recorded sales of €493.8 million: Datalogic S.p.A. is listed on the STAR segment of the Italian Stock Exchange as DAL.MI. since 2001.

== History ==
Datalogic was founded in 1972 by an engineer Romano Volta in a room in the rectory of the parish in Quarto Inferiore, on the outskirts of Bologna, in Italy. Initially, production was centred on electronic devices, but soon the direction changed towards the design and production of photoelectric sensors for textile, ceramic and packaging industries. Due to the need for expansion, the plant was soon moved to the current site of Lippo di Calderara di Reno (BO).

The first scan of a barcode in a retail store took place on June 26, 1974. A pack of chewing gum was scanned in a store in Troy, Ohio with a "Magellan Model-A": the world's first fixed retail scanner was signed by Datalogic. Today, only two copies of the original scanner are still known to exist: one kept at the Smithsonian Museum in Washington D.C. and the other is currently exhibited in the museum at the entrance to one of the Datalogic business locations in Eugene, Oregon.

In 1984 a Datalogic barcode reader was used at Linate Airport to sort baggage, the first use of a barcode reader for this purpose The first RFID application in the world with use in a post office dates back to 1999, while in 2000 the Shopevolution™ middleware was born, the first self-shopping solution involving the use of a small handheld computer with integrated barcode reader.

On June 8, 2009, Romano Volta receives the "Premio Imprese per l'Innovazione" (Business Prize for Innovation) from the President of Italy, Giorgio Napolitano for the company's growth both in Italy and globally resulting from investing in innovative technologies and methods.

=== Chairman and CEO ===
On 1 January 2017, Valentina Volta became the CEO of Datalogic. Volta has a graduate degree in Business Economics from the University of Bologna with a master's degree in Management from the Harvard Business School of Boston, Massachusetts, US. Before her entry into Datalogic, Ms. Volta worked for over 10 years in the Ferrero Group, with managerial roles in sales and marketing.

Eng. Romano Volta, founder of the company, holds the office of Executive President. In 1997, Romano Volta received the Cavaliere del Lavoro (awarded by the President of the Italian Republic). Eng. Volta is President of Aczon S.r.l. (pharmaceutical research and biotechnology) and Hydra S.p.A.

=== Acquisitions ===
Over the years, Datalogic has acquired many subsidiary companies. These include: PSC Inc. in 2005; Datasensors in 2008; Evolution Robotics Retail in 2010; PPT Vision in 2011; Accu-Sort Systems in 2012; M.D. Micro Detectors in 2021; and Pekat Vision in 2022.
