= JLL Partners =

American private equity firm

- Type: Private Ownership
- Industry: Private Equity
- Founded: 1988; 38 years ago
- Headquarters: New York City, New York, United States
- Key people: Paul S. Levy; Founder & Managing Partner
- Products: private equity funds
- Website: www.jllpartners.com

JLL Partners is an American private equity firm focused on leveraged buyout transactions and leveraged recapitalizations of middle-market companies. The firm is headquartered in New York City, and was founded in 1987. Since its founding JLL Partners has committed approximately $4.7 billion across seven funds. JLL invests in various industries including food and consumer products, automotive parts, health care, media and telecommunications, commodity and specialty chemicals, building products, transportation, and industrial manufacturing and distribution. The company tends to focus on companies requiring an operational turnaround.

== History ==
JLL traces its roots back to Gilliam Joseph & Littlejohn, a merchant bank founded in 1987 by William J. Gilliam, Peter A. Joseph, and Angus C. Littlejohn Jr. The three founders met in the mid-1980s at the Quadrex Corporation, a small New York brokerage. They initially leased their office space from Bennett S. LeBow, a 1980s corporate raider and fellow Drexel Burnham Lambert client. At Quadrex, Gilliam, the youngest of the three, managed the mergers and acquisitions unit, and the other two reported to him. After a series of successful investments, the three decided to leave Quadrex and set up their own small private equity firm.

In 1988, Paul S. Levy, a lawyer and formerly a managing director at Drexel Burnham Lambert who focused on corporate restructurings and exchange offers, was recruited to join the firm, which was renamed Gilliam Joseph Littlejohn & Levy. Earlier in his career Levy was CEO of Yves Saint Laurent, Inc., New York, and an attorney with Stroock & Stroock & Lavan. Levy helped his new partners secure $150 million of capital for buyout transactions from his former firm, Drexel Burnham Lambert.

JLL experienced an early success with the leveraged buyout of Rexene Corp, a Texas-based chemical company, which made the partners multi-millionaires. Gilliam would eventually set up his own small investment firm Gilliam & Company to focus on investments in chemicals and plastics, and would serve as chairman of Rexene. In 1991, Gilliam faced a falling out with the board of Rexene and abruptly resigned.

In 1996, Angus Littlejohn resigned from Joseph Littlejohn & Levy to form a new private investment firm, Littlejohn & Co. The following year, in 1998, Peter Joseph left and joined Palladium Equity Partners, a middle-market private equity firm with a specialization in investments in the U.S. Hispanic market and also in Mexico, Spain, and Brazil, founded the prior year.

In 2002, after a lengthy fund-raising process, the rechristened "JLL Partners" closed a new private equity fund, JLL Partners Fund IV LP., with $750 million of investor commitments, representing a 25% decrease from its previous fund.

In 2012 it managed $4 billion on behalf of its clients.

In 2015, JLL Partners acquired Aviation Technical Services Inc., one of the largest third-party providers of maintenance, repair and overhaul services in the aviation and aerospace industry including for commercial and military use.

In 2015, JLL Partners acquired Point Blank Enterprises, the largest supplier of ballistic and soft armor products for the U.S. military and law enforcement. Point Blank Enterprises manufactures and distributes bullet, stab resistant and other apparel and accessories.

In March 2020, JLL Partners announced a partnership with Bart Doedens to form Renovo Health, Inc.

== Funds raised ==
Since its founding, JLL has raised seven private equity funds:

- 1989 — Joseph Littlejohn & Levy Fund I ($221 million)
- 1994 — Joseph Littlejohn & Levy Fund II ($400 million)
- 1998 — JLL Partners Fund III ($1.0 billion, first fund raised after departure of Joseph and Littlejohn)
- 2002 — JLL Partners Fund IV ($751 million)
- 2005 — JLL Partners Fund V ($1.5 billion)
- 2008 — JLL Partners Fund VI (closed at $807 million at the end of 2008)
- 2016 — JLL Partners Fund VII ($1 billion)

== Investors ==
- Investors for Fund V included $50 million from the University of California Regents.
- Investors for Fund VI included the University of Missouri System, Montana Board of Investments, Colorado Public Employees' Retirement Association, Regents of the University of California, Travelers Companies and advised by Neuberger Berman.
- Investors for Fund VII included $200 million by the New Jersey Pension Fund.

== Portfolio companies ==
- American Dental Partners (2011)
- Aviation Technical Services (2015)
- CATO Research(2018)
- Education Affiliates (2004), parent company of Fortis College.
- EVERSANA(2018)
- Medical Card System (2004)
- Pioneer Bank
- Pioneer Landscape
- Point Blank Enterprises (2015)
- Ross Medical Education Center (2010), career schools in the US South and Midwest.

- Secretariat International (2018)
- Viant (2017)
- Xact Data Discovery (2018)

== Former investments ==
- Allegheny International (1988)
- Motor Coach Industries (1999)
- Lancer Industries, subsequently merged and renamed Fairfield Manufacturing (1986)
- Foodbrands America Inc. (1995)
- Ornda Healthcorp (1991)
- Motor Wheel Corporation, subsequently merged and renamed Hayes Lemmerz International
- J.G. Wentworth (2005)
- Iasis Healthcare
- AdvancePCS
