= PGT Windows and Doors =

- Formerly: PGT Custom Windows & Doors
- Type: Division
- Industry: Building materials
- Founded: 1980 in Venice, Florida
- Founders: Rod Hershberger; Paul Hostetler
- Headquarters: North Venice, Florida, U.S.
- Products: Impact-resistant windows and doors
- Parent: MITER Brands (2024–present); PGT Innovations (until 2024)
- Website: pgtwindows.com

PGT Windows and Doors is an American brand of impact-resistant windows and doors owned by MITER Brands and based in North Venice, Sarasota County, Florida. The business was founded in 1980 as Vinyl-Tech and began making windows in 1987. It was the first manufacturer approved by Miami-Dade County to sell laminated glass windows in place of hurricane shutters. Its maker, PGT Innovations, was listed on the New York Stock Exchange until 2024, when MITER Brands bought it for $3.1 billion and it ceased to be publicly traded.

== History ==
Rod Hershberger and Paul Hostetler founded the company in Venice, Florida, in 1980 as Vinyl-Tech, a manufacturer of porch enclosures. It began producing windows in 1987 under the name Progressive Glass Technologies. After Hurricane Andrew in 1992, Miami-Dade County adopted a stricter building code, and the company produced the first window approved under the new standard. By 1997 revenue from its WinGuard line of impact-resistant windows had reached $63 million.

The private equity firm JLL Partners acquired the company in 2004, and it went public in 2006. In 2014 it bought the Florida competitor CGI Windows & Doors for about $111 million, its first major acquisition. The company later bought several other window makers, and by 2023 it sold products under nine brands, including PGT Custom Windows and Doors, CGI, WinDoor, Western Window Systems and Anlin. In December 2016 the company was renamed PGT Innovations and moved its stock listing to the New York Stock Exchange. By 2017 PGT Custom Windows + Doors operated as a subsidiary of PGT Innovations. As of early 2021 it employed about 3,500 people at plants in Florida and Arizona. In 2021 it leased a 130,000-square-foot production plant in Fort Myers. Revenue reached a record $745 million in 2019, and the company was Sarasota County's largest private employer. In 2023 PGT Innovations gave PGT Custom Windows and Doors, which it described as its flagship brand, a new logo and tagline.

In December 2023 PGT Innovations agreed to be acquired by Masonite International for about $3 billion. In January 2024 its board accepted a $3.1 billion offer from MITER Brands, a window manufacturer backed by Koch Industries, and Masonite received an $84 million termination fee. The sale closed on March 28, 2024, and the company ceased to be publicly traded.

MITER announced layoffs at the Venice plant and other facilities in November 2024 and again in January 2025. On September 2, 2025, it announced what it called a strategic realignment of its Florida operations: the plants in Medley and Hialeah were to close in the fourth quarter of 2025 and the first quarter of 2026 respectively, two product lines were to be discontinued, and some production was to move to the PGT plants in Venice and Fort Myers. The company said 442 workers were affected. MITER said employees in Hialeah and Medley would first be offered the chance to move to Venice or Fort Myers, and that a new glass plant in Pembroke Pines was due to open in 2026.

In 2024 the brand began a partnership with Brian and Mika Kleinschmidt, home designers who appear on HGTV. In August 2025 the brand became a sponsor of the Tampa Bay Buccaneers under a multi-year agreement beginning with the team's 2025 season. In February 2026 the Scout and Sparta aluminum window and door lines and two French door models were added to the PGT range. In April 2026 MITER introduced a new visual identity for the PGT brand, which it said had been in use since 1987, and shortened the brand name from PGT Custom Windows and Doors to PGT Windows and Doors.
