= J.G. Wentworth =

American diversified financial services company

The J.G. Wentworth Company
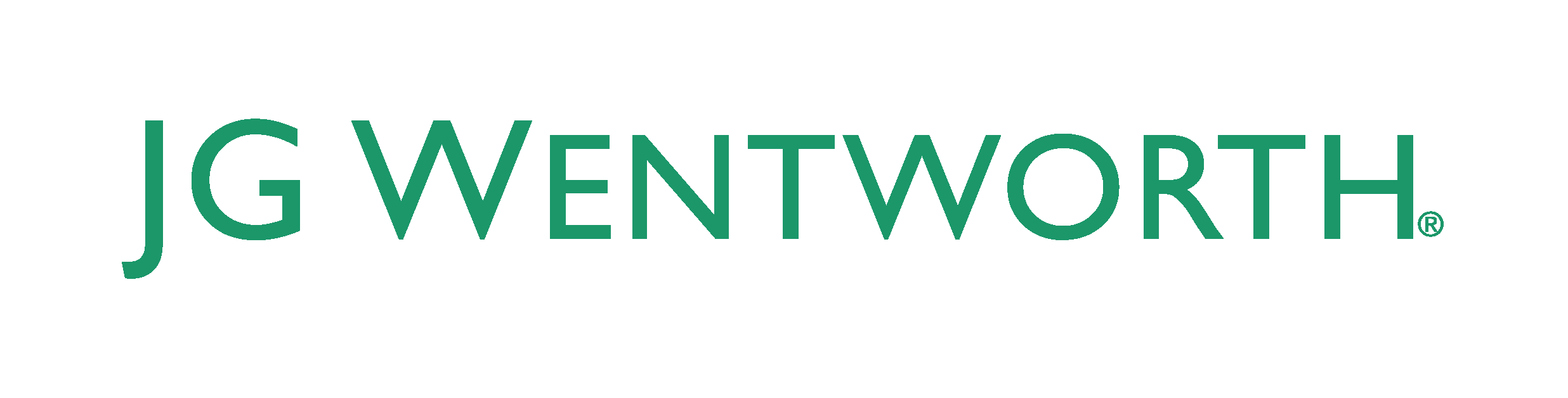
- Industry: Finance
- Founded: 1991; 35 years ago
- Headquarters: Chesterbrook, Pennsylvania, U.S.
- Area served: United States
- Key people: Randi Sellari (CEO, Specialty Finance); Dwight Perry (CFO); Randy Parker (COO)
- Services: Debt relief Payment purchasing: structured settlements Annuities; Lottery and casino winnings Lawsuit advance
- Website: www.jgwentworth.com

The J.G. Wentworth Company is an American financial services company that purchases structured settlements, annuities, and lottery payments in exchange for a lump-sum cash settlement. They also offer debt counseling and negotiation services.

The company is known for its television advertisements featuring "Mr. Wentworth", and a series featuring performances of a lengthy jingle performed in several styles, including Wagnerian opera singers.

== History ==
J.G. Wentworth was formed by James D. Delaney and Gary Veloric in 1991 as a merchant bank specializing in transactions in the healthcare industry. In 1992, the company began to purchase New Jersey auto insurance deferrals from claimants who could not afford to wait twelve to eighteen months for their settlements. According to Consumer Reports, as of 2010, J.G. Wentworth customers paid an "effective discount rate" amounting to "9 percent to 15 percent or more"; i.e., customers give up 9–15 percent of their future payments in exchange for a present-day cash amount. Though this might be considered a high fee, Consumer Reports says it could be preferable to surrender fees for annuities or other alternatives.

Prior to 1999, there was no regulation for structured settlements in the state of New York. Eliot Spitzer, then New York's state Attorney General, entered into a contract with J.G. Wentworth to regulate the industry and limit fees. The agreement stipulated that J.G. Wentworth could receive a rate of no more than twenty-five percent of the annual discount rate of annuities it had purchased from citizens of the state of New York. At the time, a JGW executive told the New York Times that the firm sought the agreement because of the rate at which its business had grown.

In May 2009, J.G. Wentworth's parent company, JGW Holdco LLC, entered Chapter 11 bankruptcy protection partly due to the 2008 financial crisis. The company cited "liquidity problems amid a tightening credit market" as the motive for filing. In June 2009, JGW Holdco LLC received $100 million in equity from primary stakeholder JLL Partners, which allowed the company and its subsidiaries to emerge from bankruptcy.

In 2011, J.G. Wentworth and similar business Peachtree Financial Solutions, formed a new holding company, JGWPT Holdings LLC. The two companies continued to operate independently after the transition.

In October 2013, the firm filed for an initial public offering, which was offered the subsequent month. The company was initially listed on the New York Stock Exchange under the symbol JGWE.

In 2015, J.G. Wentworth expanded their financial offerings with the purchase of WestStar Mortgage for US$44 million in common shares and cash. In the same year, the company announced a partnership with Visa to offer a prepaid card to customers.

In June 2016, J.G. Wentworth was delisted from the NYSE for failing to satisfy the continued listing rule of having an average 30-day market capitalization of at least $15 million. Later that month, the company began trading on the OTC Markets Group under the symbol JGWE.

On November 8, 2017, J.G. Wentworth filed for Chapter 11 bankruptcy for the second time in nine years. JGWE stock plummeted by as much as eighty-seven percent on November 10, 2017. The company was expected to emerge from bankruptcy in or around January 2018 after coming to an agreement with lenders prior to filing.

== Commercials and awards ==
The company is best known for its American daytime television commercials featuring the character of "Mr. Wentworth".

J.G. Wentworth first premiered its opera commercials in 2002. The commercials played from 2002 to 2007 until the launch of the new campaign in 2008. More recent ad series feature Wagnerian opera singers performing the company's jingle. Taglines include "It's my money and I need it now!" and "It's your money; use it when you need it!"

J.G. Wentworth has won several domestic and international awards for its television advertising, including a silver Davey award. The "Wagnerian Opera" commercial won two International Summit Awards for Best Humor and Best TV between US$75k and US$100k.

In 2019, J.G. Wentworth reported that it was named in the category of IES Premier Sales Employer by The Institute for Excellence in Sales (IES).

== J.G. Wentworth brands and subsidiaries ==
J.G. Wentworth owns and operates under a number of brands. The main three brands owned by J.G. Wentworth are J.G. Wentworth, Peachtree, and Stone Street Capital.

Additional brands and subsidiaries include:

- J.G. Wentworth, LLC
- Peachtree Financial Solutions
- Stone Street Capital, LLC
- Stone Street Originations, LLC
- Peachtree Life Settlements, LLC
- J.G. Wentworth Home Equity Services, LLC
- Orchard Acquisition Company, LLC
- J.G. Wentworth Structured Settlement Funding II, LLC
- PeachHI, LLC
- J.G. Wentworth SSC, LP
- Red Apple Management Company, LLC
- Golden Apple Management Company, LLC
- J.G. Wentworth Management Company, LLC
- J.G. Wentworth Originations, LLC
- Green Apple Management Company, LLC
- Qualified Provider Associates, LLC
- JGW Pre-Settlement Funding, LLC
- Cash Now Loans, LLC
- J.G. Wentworth Receivables II, LLC
- Peachtree Originations, LLC
- Lottery Originations, LLC
- Settlement Funding Management Company, LLC
- Peach Holdings, LLC
- Receivables Collections, LLC
- JGW II, LLC
- JGW III, LLC
- JGW-S LC I, LLC
- JGW-S LC II, LLC
- JGW-S Holdco, LLC
- LCSS, LLC
- JGW-S I, LLC
- JGW-S II, LLC
- JGW-S III, LLC
- JGW-S IV, LLC
- R.C. Henderson, LLC
- 321 Henderson Receivables Acquisition, LLC
- JGW Residual I, LLC

== Controversies ==
JG Wentworth has been known to take large amounts of money from the structured settlements they end as a fee. Additionally, JG Wentworth targets individuals with low literacy levels that don't entirely understand the agreement they are making with JG Wentworth. This has been covered by multiple news sources, as well as late night talk show host John Oliver.
