= Peachtree Financial Solutions =

US alternative lender

- Industry: Finance
- Founded: 1996
- Headquarters: Radnor, PA, United States
- Area served: United States
- Services: Settlement Funding · Pre-settlement Funding · Lottery Winnings · Buys Life Settlements
- Website: Peachtree Financial Solutions

Peachtree Financial Solutions is a company headquartered in Radnor, PA. Peachtree provides cash to individuals with illiquid assets such as structured settlement payments, annuity payments, lottery winnings, and active non-settled lawsuits.

The company was founded in 1996. Ten years later, in 2006 the US based company went public overseas on the London Stock Exchange, rather than the United States.

Peachtree Financial was purchased by The JG Wentworth Company in 2011.

== Company ==
Peachtree Financial specializes in purchasing liquid assets such as lottery winnings, structured settlements, and life insurance policies. The company provides specialty asset portfolio servicing to third party investors, which can include pre-settlement funding and attorney cost financing. Attorney cost financing can potentially help lawyers assist with potential cash flow issues.

Peachtree provides cash to personal injury, product liability, and wrongful death plaintiffs while their case is either still pending or, if successful, awaiting settlement payment. Sometimes a plaintiff may be forced to settle their case early for less cash than they deserve, because they have been unable to work due to their injury. The cash Peachtree can provide could be used to cover interim expenses of any type, whether personal, medical or business.

== Products ==
=== Structured Settlement ===
Peachtree Financial gives structured settlement recipients the option to receive their cash sooner, by selling their structured settlement payments. These regular payments from insurance companies, often as a result of a personal injury lawsuit, can be sold in portions, or all at once. All structured settlement payment transfers require a court approval, in order to protect the individual, according to the Structured Settlement Protection Act for that state.

=== Annuities ===
Annuity recipients often receive an annuity in one of three ways: they purchased the annuity as an investment, they purchased an annuity for their retirement plan, or they inherited the annuity. Similar to their structured settlement payment purchasing department, the company purchases some of, or their entire annuity payment stream for cash sooner. Unlike structured settlements transfers, annuity transfers do not require court approval.

=== Pre-Settlement Funding ===
Peachtree can provide cash to plaintiffs involved in active, non-settled personal injury lawsuits. These lawsuit advances are not loans, but rather a form of nonrecourse advance against an anticipated settlement. These advances do not have to be repaid if the plaintiff's lawsuit is unsuccessful.

== Advertising ==
Since its founding, the official mascot of Peachtree Financial Solutions has been Peaches the dog. Peaches has been featured in numerous national commercials.

Peaches, the official mascot

== Awards and recognition ==
The company was one of America's main providers of structured settlement purchases to victims of New Orleans' Hurricane Katrina in 2005.

Peachtree Financial Solutions has received numerous awards for their products since it was founded.

- New York Law Journal – Best Litigation Funding Provider
- The Legal Intelligencer – Gold "Case Funding Provider"
- New Jersey Law Journal – Top Funding Company
- The Recorder - Best Litigation Funding Provider in California

== See also ==
- Legal Financing
- Lump Sum
