= Education Affiliates =

American education company

Education Affiliates (EA) is an American parent company of private colleges, with its headquarters in Nottingham, Maryland. It has been an investment of JLL Partners since 2004. According to D&B Hoovers, EA has annual sales of $202 million. Education Affiliates owns approximately 50 campuses and learning centers.

Education Affiliates' schools include Fortis College and Fortis Institute, ASPE Training, All-State Career School, DriveCo CDL Learning Center, Saint Paul's School of Nursing, Georgia Driving Academy, and the Denver School of Nursing.

== History ==
=== 1984-2004 (Origins) ===
The Baltimore-based company was first incorporated in 1984 as The Marco Group, Inc. and changed its name to Education Affiliates Inc. in 2004.

=== 2005-2013 (Growth) ===
In November 2004, JLL Partners, a New York-based private equity firm, paid $52 million for Baltimore-based Marco Group, which owned 10 vocational schools. In 2005, the Baltimore Business Journal reported on the "buying spree" that Education Affiliates was engaging in, with the financial support of JLL. Corinthian Colleges and Career Education Corporation were its larger competitors.

=== 2013-present (Downsizing) ===
Since 2013, EA has faced declining enrollments and has closed some of its Fortis brand campuses.

== Leadership ==
Duncan M. Anderson is the CEO and co-founder of Education Affiliates. Stephen J. Budosh is the chief financial officer.

== Locations (and student enrollment) ==
=== All-State Career School ===
- Baltimore, MD (561 students)
- Essington, PA-Allied Health Campus (355 students)
- Lester, PA (306 students)
- Pittsburgh, PA (189 students)
- Kearneysville, WV (not reported)
- Wheeling, WV (not reported)

The schools are accredited by the Accrediting Commission of Career Schools and Colleges.

=== Denver College of Nursing ===
- Denver, CO (796 students)

Denver College of Nursing is regionally accredited by the Higher Learning Commission. The school has program accreditation from Accreditation Commission for Education in Nursing, Inc.

=== DriveCo CDL Learning Center ===
- Gary, IN (not reported)

=== Fortis College ===
- Dothan, AL (165 students)
- Foley, AL (87 students)
- Mobile, AL (375 students)
- Montgomery, AL (311 students)
- Cutler Bay, FL (388 students)
- Orange Park, FL (489 students)
- Smyrna, GA (678 students)
- Indianapolis, IN (416 students)
- Baton Rouge, LA (408 students)
- Landover, MD (712 students)
- Centerville, OH (559 students)
- Cincinnati, OH (587 students)
- Columbus, OH (1,042 students)
- Cuyahoga Falls, OH (575 students)
- Columbia, SC (569 students)
- Houston, TX (394 students)
- Salt Lake City, UT (539 students)
- Norfolk, VA (454 students)
- Richmond, VA (507 students)

=== Fortis Institute ===
- Birmingham, AL (551 students)
- Pensacola, FL (705 students)
- Port St. Lucie, FL (474 students)
- Towson, MD (558 students)
- Lawrenceville, NJ (314 students)
- Wayne, NJ (521 students)
- Forty Fort, PA (182 students)
- Scranton, PA (279 students)
- Cookeville, TN (302 students)
- Nashville, TN (475 students)
- Houston, TX (390 students)

=== Georgia Driving Academy ===
- Conyers, GA (not reported)

=== St. Paul’s School of Nursing ===
- Queens, NY (550 students)
- Staten Island, NY

== Financial difficulties ==
Several Fortis Institute schools are under Department of Education heightened cash monitoring. Nineteen schools in the EA chain had the lowest financial responsibility score. As of February 2021, Fortis owes $2.37 million to the US Department of Education.

== Lawsuits and settlements ==
In 2014, two former All-State admissions representatives and a former test administrator were sentenced in Maryland federal court for conspiring in a test-cheating scheme that gave ineligible students access to federal Title IV education funds.

In 2015, Education Affiliates agreed to pay the US government $13 million to resolve allegations it violated the False Claims Act. According to the US Department of Justice, the company had submitted false claims to the US Department of Education for federal student aid for students enrolled in its programs. The settlements were the result of a joint effort by the U.S. Attorneys’ Offices in Maryland, the Southern District of Texas, the Northern District of Alabama, Southern District of Ohio, Middle District of Tennessee, and the Civil Division’s Commercial Litigation Branch, and the Department of Education and its OIG. The settlement also resolved allegations related to Education Affiliates schools in Birmingham, Alabama, Houston and Cincinnati, "including violations of the ban on incentive compensation for enrollment personnel, misrepresentations of graduation and job placement rates, alteration of attendance records and enrollment of unqualified students." As part of the settlement, the company did not admit guilt.
