= National Silicon Industry Group =

Chinese semiconductor wafer manufacturer

National Silicon Industry Group Co., Ltd.
- Trade name: NSIG
- Native name: 上海硅产业集团股份有限公司
- Company type: Public; State-owned enterprise
- Traded as: SSE: 688126
- Industry: Semiconductors
- Founded: 9 December 2015; 10 years ago
- Headquarters: Shanghai, China
- Key people: Yu Yuehui (Chairman); Qiu Ciyun (President)
- Revenue: ▼CN¥3.19 billion (2023)
- Net income: ▼CN¥160.72 million (2023)
- Total assets: ▲CN¥29.03 billion (2023)
- Total equity: ▲CN¥20.51 billion (2023)
- Owner: China Integrated Circuit Industry Investment Fund (20.64%)
- Number of employees: 2,377 (2023)
- Subsidiaries: Okmetic
- Website: www.nsig.com

National Silicon Industry Group (NSIG; Chinese: 硅产业集团; pinyin: Guīchǎnyè Jítuán) is a partially state-owned publicly listed Chinese semiconductor company headquartered in Shanghai.

The company engages in the development and sale of semiconductor wafers. It is the largest domestic producer of semiconductor wafers in China.

== Background ==
NSIG was founded in December 2015. It was established by government related entities including the Shanghai Municipal People's Government, China Integrated Circuit Industry Investment Fund and Semiconductor Manufacturing International Corporation.

In 2016, NSIG acquired Finnish company, Okmetic. In the same year, NSIG acquired a 14.5% stake in French company, Soitec. NSIG would later trim its stake in Soitec.

On 20 April 2022, NSIG held its initial public offering becoming a listed company on the Shanghai Stock Exchange STAR Market. The offering raised $341 million with shares of the company jumping over 180% on its trading debut.

In May 2022, NSIG announced that it would invest $408.6 million building a production plant in Finland with Okmetic being responsible for it.

== See also ==
- Okmetic
- Semiconductor industry in China
