= Structured settlement factoring transaction =

A structured settlement factoring transaction means a transfer of structured settlement payment rights (including portions of structured settlement payments) made for consideration by means of sale, assignment, pledge, or other form of encumbrance or alienation for consideration. In order for such transfer to be approved, the transfer must comply with Internal Revenue Code section 5891 and any applicable state structured settlement protection law.

== Purpose of a structured settlement factoring transaction ==
A structured settlement factoring transaction is a means to raise liquidity where there is no other viable means, via the transfer of structured settlement payment rights, for items such as unforeseen medical expenses, the need for improved housing or transportation, education expenses and the like, or in a situation where the individual has simply spent all his or her cash. To meet this need, the structured settlement recipient may involve the sale (or, less commonly, the encumbrance) of all or part of certain future periodic payments for a lump sum. Generally such lump sums are discounted. If a person sells the structured settlement payment rights, he or she will never receive the full amount of the payments originally contracted for when the individual settled his or her case and the structured settlement was established. A judge must review the submission and determine that the structured settlement transfer is in the best interest of the payee and any applicable dependents.

== History ==
Structured settlements experienced an explosion in use beginning in the 1980s. Growth in the United States was most likely attributable to the favorable federal income tax treatment for such settlements receive as a result of the 1982 amendment of the Internal Revenue Code to add 26 USC § 130.

Beginning in the late 1980s, a few small financial institutions started to meet this demand and offer new flexibility for structured settlement payees. Financial commentators and lawyers suggest caution in the sale of structured settlements.

== Controversy Concerning "Servicing" of Structured Settlement Payments by Factoring Companies ==
Servicing of structured settlement payments occurs when a structured settlement payee sells only a portion of their future structured settlement payment rights, yet concurrent with the transfer, the factoring company also enters into an agreement to "service" the structured settlement payments that have not been sold.

In "servicing" practice, one check is made payable to the factoring company instead of one to the factoring company and one to the payee. The factoring company receives the entire structured settlement payment, when due from the annuity issuer, takes what is owed to it and "passes through" the balance to the payee. This involves issuing a separate check to the payee issued off the factoring company account.

It has been alleged that annuity issuers will not address questions of payees whose payments are subject to a servicing agreement. Some factoring industry commentators suggest the reason for this phenomenon is that some structured annuity issuers will not "split" annuity payments (i.e. make payments to more than one place)ostensibly to save administrative cost. Others say that the practice is driven by the factoring companies simply as a means to secure new business. Several industry commentators have expressed concerns questioned whether such servicing agreements are in the structured settlement payee's "best interest".

What they say needs to be addressed is what effect the bankruptcy of a factoring company "servicing company" would have on the payee, with respect to the payments being serviced. Until this issue is decided, payees who are considering partial structured settlement transfers should be wary about participating in "servicing agreements". One possible solution has been suggested-that there be a requirement that servicing companies post a bond.

== Factoring Terminology ==
=== Discount Rate ===
In the beginning, the factoring industry had some relatively high discount rates due to heavy expenses caused by costly litigation battles and limited access to traditional investors. However, once state and federal legislation was enacted, the industry's interest rates decreased dramatically.

There is much confusion with the terminology “discount rate” because the term is used in different ways. The discount rate referred to in a factoring transaction is similar to an interest rate associated with home loans, credit cards and car loans where the interest rate is applied to the payment stream itself. In a factoring transaction, the factoring company knows the payment stream they are going to purchase and applies an interest rate to the payment stream itself and solves for the funding amount, as though it was a loan. Discount rates from factoring companies to consumers can range anywhere between 8% up to over 18% but usually average somewhere in the middle. Factoring discount rates can be a bit higher when compared to home loan interest rates, due to the fact the factoring transactions are more of a boutique product for investors opposed to the mainstream collateralized mortgage transactions.

One common mistake in calculating the discount rate is to use “elementary school math” where you take the funding/loan amount and divide it by the total price of all the payments being purchased. Because this method disregards the concept of time (and the time value of money), the resulting percentage is useless. For example, the court in In Re Henderson Receivables Origination v. Campos noted an annual discount rate of 16.8% where the annuitant received $36,500 for the assignment of payments totaling $63,364.94 over 84 months (two monthly payments of $672.32 each, beginning September 30, 2006 and ending on October 31, 2006; eighty-two monthly payments of $692.49 each, increasing 3% every twelve months, beginning on November 30, 2006 and ending on August 31, 2013). However, had the court in Henderson Receivables Origination applied the illogical formula of discounting from “elementary school math” ($36,500/ $63,364.94), the discount rate would have been an astronomical (and nonsensical) 61%.

=== Discounted Present Value ===
Another term commonly used in factoring transactions is “discounted present value,” which is defined in the National Conference of Insurance Legislators's model transfer act as “the present value of future payments determined by discounting such payments to the present using the most recently published Applicable Federal Rate for determining the present value of an annuity, as issued by the United States Internal Revenue Service.”

The discount rate, also known as the Applicable Federal Rate (AFR), is used to determine the charitable deduction for many types of planned gifts, such as charitable remainder trusts and gift annuities. The rate is the annual rate of return that the IRS assumes the gift assets will earn during the gift term. The IRS discount rate is published monthly. In Henderson Receivables Origination, the court calculated the discounted present value of the $63,364.94 to be transferred as $50,933.18 based on the applicable federal rate of 6.00%.

The “discounted present value” is a measuring stick for determining what the value of a future payment (i.e., a payment that is due in the year 2057) is today. Hence, the discounted present value of a payment corrects for inflation and the principle that money available today is worth more than money not accessible for 50 years (or some future time). However, the discounted present value is not the same thing as market value (what someone is willing to pay). Basically, a calculation that discounts a future payment based on IRS rates is an artificial number since it has no bearing on the payment's actual selling price. For example, in Henderson Receivables Origination, it is somewhat confusing for the court to evaluate future payments totaling $63,364,94 based the discounted present value of $50,933.18 because that is not the market value of the payments. In other words, the annuitant couldn't go out and get $50,933.18 for his future payments because no person or company would be willing to pay that much. Some states will require a quotient to be listed on the disclosure that is sent to the customer prior to entering into a contract with a factoring company. The quotient is calculated by dividing the purchase price by the discounted present value. The quotient (like the discounted present value) provides no relevance in the pricing of a settlement factoring transaction. In Henderson Receivables Origination, the court did consider this quotient which was calculated as 71.70% ($36,500/ $50,933.18).

== United States ==
=== Consumer Financial Protection Bureau warning ===
The Consumer Financial Protection Bureau (CFPB) has issued a warning to consumers that consumers could receive much less cash than their settlement is worth. Dealing with companies that offer lump sum payments for their disability, personal injury or structured settlement payments can be risky. Some companies target people with disabilities who have structured settlements. If an individual receives a flyer or solicitation promising fast cash or a lump sum payment for monthly payments, the individual should use caution. The CFPB cautions that individuals should consider all options, including talking to trusted people or to a lawyer or financial counselor, before trading future payments for instant cash.

The CFPB warning follows several high-profile news stories and lawsuits over the alleged abusive business practices by companies that purchase structured settlement payments. Several states have implemented structured settlement protection reforms in order to minimize abuses.

=== Process ===
==== Pre-2002 ====
Congress enacted law to provide special tax breaks for payments received by tort victims in structured settlements, and for the companies that funded them. The payments were tax free, whereas if the tort victim had been given a lump sum and invested it themselves, the payments from those investments would be taxable.

Companies liked structured settlements because it allowed them to avoid taxes to a certain extent, and plaintiffs liked them because it allowed them to receive tax-free payments of what became, over time, a much larger amount of money than the original amount paid out by the settling party. Such settlements were also considered an especially good idea for minors, as they held the money safe for adulthood and ensured that youth would not find the money wasted or ill-spent. “Despite the best intentions of plaintiffs, lump sum settlement awards are often quickly dissipated because of excessive spending, poor financial management, or a combination of both. Statistics showed that twenty-five to thirty percent of all cash awards are exhausted within two months, and ninety percent are exhausted within five years.”

An explanation of Internal Revenue Code section 130 was given during discussions of possible taxation of companies that bought future payments under those structured settlements. “By enacting the PPSA, Congress expressed its support of structured settlements, and sought to shield victims and their families from pressures to prematurely dissipate their recoveries.”

Congress was willing to afford such tax advantages based on the belief that the loss in income taxes would be more than made up by lower expenditures on public assistance programs for those who suffered significant injuries. A strict requirement for a structured settlement to qualify for this tax break was that the tort victim was barred from accessing their periodic payments before they came due. It was for this reason that the annuity had to be owned by another who had control over it. The tort victim could not be seen to have “constructive receipt” of the annuity funds prior to their periodic payments. If the tort victim could cash in the annuity at any time, it was possible that the IRS might find constructive receipt.

According to Joseph M. Mikrut, “Congress conditioned the favorable rules on a requirement that the periodic payments cannot be accelerated, deferred, increased or decreased by the injured person. Both the House Ways and Means and Senate Finance Committee Reports stated that the periodic payments as personal injury damages are still excludable from income only if the recipient is not in constructive receipt of or does not have the current economic benefit of the sum required to produce the periodic payments.” “These factoring transactions directly undermine the policy objective underlying the structured settlement tax regime, that of protecting the long term financial needs of injured persons . . . “

Mikrut was testifying in favor of imposing a punitive tax on factoring companies that engaged in pursuit of structured settlement payments. Despite the use of non-assignment clauses in annuity contracts to secure the tax advantages for tort victims, companies cropped up that tried to take advantage of these individuals in ”factoring” transactions, purchasing their periodic payments in return for a deeply discounted lump sump payment. Congress felt that factoring company purchases of structured settlement payments “so directly subvert the Congressional policy underlying structured settlements and raise such serious concerns for the injured victims,” that bills were proposed in both the Senate and the House to penalize companies which engage in such transactions.

Before the enactment of IRC 5891, which became effective on July 1, 2002, some states regulated the transfer of structured settlement payment rights, while others did not. Most states that regulated transfers at this time followed a general pattern, substantially similar to the present day process which is mandated in IRC 5891 (see below for more details of the post-2002 process). However, the majority of the transfers processed from 1988 to 2002 were not court ordered. After negotiating the terms of the transaction (including the payments to be sold and the price to be paid for those payments), a formal purchase contract was executed, effecting an assignment of the subject payments upon closing. Part of this assignment process also included the grant of a security interest in the structured settlement payments, to secure performance of the seller's obligations. Filing a public lien based on that security agreement created notice of this assignment and interest. The insurance company issuing the structured settlement annuity checks was typically not given actual notice of the transfer, due to antagonism by the insurance industry against factoring and transfer companies. Many annuity issuers were concerned that factoring transactions, which were not contemplated when Congress enacted section 130, might upset the tax treatment of qualified assignments. House of Representatives Bill 2884 (discussed below) resolved this question for annuity issuers.

==== Federal legislation ====
In 2001, Congress passed HR 2884, signed into law by the President in 2002 and effective July 1, 2002, codified at Internal Revenue Code § 5891. Through a punitive excise tax penalty, this has created the de facto regulatory paradigm for the factoring industry. In essence, to avoid the excise tax penalty, IRC 5891 requires that all structured settlement factoring transactions be approved by a state court, in accordance with a qualified state statute. Qualified state statutes must make certain baseline findings, including that the transfer is in the best interest of the seller, taking into account the welfare and support of any dependents. In response, many states enacted statutes regulating structured settlement transfers in accord with this mandate.

==== Post-2002 ====
Today, all transfers are completed through a court order process. As of January 1, 2013, 47 states have transfer laws in place regulating the transfer process. Of these, 37 of the laws are based in whole or in part on the model state law enacted by NCOIL, the National Conference of Insurance Legislators (or, in cases when the state law predates the model act, they are substantially similar).

Most state transfer laws contain similar provisions, as follows: (1) pre-contract disclosures to be made to the seller concerning the essentials of the transaction; (2) notice to certain interested parties; (3) an admonition to seek professional advice concerning the proposed transfer; and (4) court approval of the transfer, including a finding that it is in the best interest of seller, taking into account the welfare and support of any dependents.

In 2005, the ABA Journal, a publication of the American Bar Association, published Transfers of Structured Settlement Payment Rights: What Judges Should Know about Structured Settlement Protection Acts. The article cites the "unusual combination of state law requirements and federal tax law sanctions" and "explains the SSPAs and their relationship to the IRC and discusses some of the key questions that courts need to address in ruling on SSPA applications."

=== Federal tax law ===
Internal Revenue Code section 130 provides substantial tax incentives to insurance companies that establish “qualified” structured settlements. There are other advantages for the original tort defendant (or casualty insurer) in settling for payments over time, in that they benefit from the time value of money (most demonstrable in the fact that an annuity can be purchased to fund the payment of future periodic payments, and the cost of such annuity is far less than the sum total of all payments to be made over time). Finally, the tort plaintiff also benefits in several ways from a structured settlement, notably in the ability to receive the periodic payments from an annuity that gains investment value over the life of the payments, and the settling plaintiff receives the total payments, including that “inside build-up” value, tax-free.

However, a substantial downside to structured settlements comes from their inherent inflexibility. To take advantage of the tax benefits allotted to defendants who choose to settle cases using structured settlements, the periodic payments must be set up to meet basic requirements set forth in Internal Revenue Code section 130(c). Among other things, the payments must be fixed and determinable, and cannot be accelerated, deferred, increased or decreased by the recipient. For many structured settlement recipients, the periodic payment stream is their only asset. Therefore, over time and as recipients’ personal situations change in ways unpredicted at the settlement table, demand for liquidity options rises. To offset the liquidity issue, most structured settlement recipients, as a part of their total settlement, will receive an immediate sum to be invested to meet the needs not best addressed through the use of a structured settlement.

=== Best Interest Standard ===
Internal Revenue Code Sec. 5891 and most state laws require that a court find that a proposed settlement factoring transaction be in the best interest of the seller, taking into account the welfare and support of any dependents. “Best interest” is generally not defined, which gives judges flexibility to make a subjective determination on a case-by-case basis. Some state laws may require that the judge look at factors such as the “purpose of the intended use of the funds,” the payee's mental and physical capacity, and the seller's potential need for future medical treatment. One Minnesota court described the “best interest standard” as a determination involving “a global consideration of the facts, circumstances, and means of support available to the payee and his or her dependents.”

Courts have consistently found that the “best interest standard” is not limited to financial hardship cases. Hence, a transfer may be in a seller's best interest because it allows him to take advantage of an opportunity (i.e., buy a new home, start a business, attend college, etc.) or to avoid disaster (i.e., pay for a family member's unexpected medical care, pay off mounting debt, etc.). For example, a New Jersey court found that a transaction was in a seller's best interest where the funds were used to “pay off bills…and to buy a home and get married.”

Although sometimes criticized for being vague, the best interest standard's lack of precise definition allows considerable latitude in judicial review. Courts can consider on a case-by-case basis the totality of the circumstances surrounding the transfer to determine whether it should be approved.

== See also ==
- Structured settlement
- Personal injury
- Annuity
- Lump sum
- Tort
- Internal Revenue Code
- Swap (finance)
