= PSC Inc. =

- Industry: Terminal manufacturing
- Founded: 1969
- Headquarters: Webster, New York, United States

PSC Inc. was a manufacturer of portable data terminals, mobile data terminals, wireless terminals, barcode readers, linear barcode verifiers, and RFID readers. It was founded in 1969 by John E. Blackert (Xerox) and Lawrence P. Albertson (Kodak) as Photographic Sciences Corporation in Webster, New York (a suburb of Rochester).

== History ==
In 1996, PSC acquired Spectra-Physics Scanning Systems, Inc., and also acquired Percon Inc., a manufacturer of portable data terminals.

In 2002, PSC went through bankruptcy reorganization. Littlejohn & Co., a private equity firm, purchased all of the company's senior and subordinated debt of $124 million. During the reorganization PSC spun off its software division, IntelliTrack to private investors.

== Acquisition by Datalogic ==
On October 24, 2005, Datalogic announced that it had signed a binding contract for the takeover of the entire capital stock of PSC Inc. The agreed price was set at approximately $195 Million. Datalogic retired the PSC brand name on April 2, 2007. The PSC legacy was catered to in the new corporate logo of Datalogic by adding a star representing PSC. Datalogic decided to retain some of the PSC product brand names including Magellan, Duet, Falcon, PowerScan, and QuickScan.
