= Endowment selling =

Selling an endowment policy rather than surrendering it

Endowment selling is the selling of an endowment policy to a third party instead of surrendering it to the original life assurance company. This is often done in an attempt to gain more money than the value given when surrendering. It became common in the United Kingdom after with-profits endowment policies were sold to support mortgages in the 1980s and 1990s.

== History ==
In the United Kingdom, with-profits endowment policies were aggressively sold for many years, especially during the late 1980s and early 1990s, by UK insurance companies. The policies were marketed as an almost guaranteed way to pay off a mortgage and leave the policy holder with a lump sum once it had matured.

The with profits endowment policy was sold alongside an interest only mortgage. By only paying interest, mortgage repayments were kept low. However, in addition the mortgage holder had to pay monthly premiums on their endowment which ran for the term of the mortgage, typically 25 years.

The insurance company would invest most of the premium into their with profits fund, which in turn would invest in a balanced portfolio of largely UK based stocks, shares, property and fixed interest assets. A small amount of the premium was used to provide life cover for the policy holder.

The aim was that the return on the with profits endowment would be in excess of the mortgage interest over the term of the mortgage. Hence, the mortgage holder would effectively create a leveraged investment that would aim to repay the mortgage sooner, and\or provide a surplus.

The projected endowment returns used in selling these types of products was often in excess of 10%pa. As these levels of return have not been achieved over recent years, many endowments are currently maturing (or are projected to mature) with a significant shortfall. This has led to endowment misselling compensation claims being made in the UK.

== Surrendering verses selling ==
When it became apparent that many policies would not cover the cost of the mortgage loan, policy holders sought alternative methods to repay their mortgage and dispose of their endowment policies. Whilst initially, the only method was to surrender (cancel) the policy with the life assurance company themselves, obtaining the surrender value calculated by them, a second hand market slowly developed, providing policyholders with much added value over their surrender values.

Typical market prices in 2013 were 5-6% above the surrender value of the policy.

Now, many companies offer to buy the with profits endowment policy from the holder for more than the surrender value. This practice has created a thriving industry of endowment policy buyers. Members of the public can either contact these companies directly or they can use the services of a Traded Endowment Specialist.

Traded Endowment Specialists are companies that deal exclusively with Second Hand Endowment Policies and obtain offers from the entire market. They can also provide offers from some buyers that do not purchase directly from the public and will only offer through these Traded Endowment Specialists.

Not all purchase offers are the same as some buyers will purchase on a 'guaranteed-offer' basis whilst others will make initial offers that are subject to sale. These offers are not guaranteed as there is no definite purchaser in place. Yet other companies retain the right to revalue or cancel their offer at their discretion throughout the sale.
