= Littlejohn & Co. =

American financial services company

- Type: Private Ownership
- Industry: Private Equity
- Founded: 1987; 39 years ago
- Founder: Angus C. Littlejohn Jr. Michael I. Klein
- Headquarters: Cos Cob, Connecticut, United States
- Products: Private equity funds, Leveraged buyouts, Distressed securities
- Total assets: $4.9 billion
- Website: www.littlejohnllc.com

Littlejohn & Co. is a private equity firm focused on leveraged buyout transactions, leveraged recapitalizations of middle-market companies and distressed securities. The firm focuses on companies requiring an operational turnaround particularly in a variety of industrial and service sectors.

The firm is based in Cos Cob, Connecticut and was founded in 1996 by Angus C. Littlejohn Jr.

== History ==
In 1996, Angus Littlejohn resigned from Joseph Littlejohn & Levy (today known as JLL Partners) to form a new private investment firm with Michael Klein: Littlejohn & Co. JLL underwent significant turnover as the following year co-founder Peter Joseph also left the firm.

Littlejohn traces its roots back to Gilliam Joseph & Littlejohn, a merchant bank founded in 1987 by Angus C. Littlejohn Jr., along with William J. Gilliam and Peter A. Joseph. Littlejohn had previously worked with his two co-founders the Quadrex Corporation, a small New York brokerage firm. In 1988, Paul S. Levy, formerly a managing director, at Drexel Burnham Lambert, focusing on corporate restructurings and exchange offers was recruited to join the firm, which was renamed Gilliam Joseph Littlejohn & Levy and later Joseph Littlejohn & Levy, when Gilliam was forced to leave the partnership in 1989.

In July 2014, Littlejohn & Co held a final close for its fifth fund on its hard cap of $2 billion.

== Funds raised ==
Since its founding, Littlejohn has raised five main private equity funds, as well as an annex fund and a distressed securities fund, with investor commitments totaling $7.8 billion:

- 1997 — Littlejohn Fund I ($200 million)
- 1999 — Littlejohn Fund II ($530 million)
- 2005 — Littlejohn Fund III ($650 million)
- 2007 — Littlejohn Fund III add-on ($200 million)
- 2010 — Littlejohn Fund IV ($1.34 billion)
- 2014 — Littlejohn Fund V ($2.0 billion)
- 2018 — Littlejohn Fund VI ($2.84 billion)

== Portfolio companies ==
The following is a selected list of notable companies in which Littlejohn has invested:

- Durakon Industries
- Foodbrands America Inc.
- Polymer Corporation
- PSC Inc.
- Van Houtte
- Wyle Laboratories
