= Okmetic =

- Industry: Silicon wafer production
- Predecessor: Okmetic Oy
- Founded: 1985; 41 years ago
- Headquarters: Vantaa, Finland
- Area served: Global
- Parent: National Silicon Industry Group

Okmetic is a Chinese-owned company in Finland that supplies 150-300 mm silicon wafers to be used in the manufacture of MEMS,sensor, RF, Power, Memory, Logic, Mixed signal IC, as well as discrete semiconductors and analog circuits.Okmetic has in-house manufacturing for 150-200 mm silicon and SOI wafers and 300 mm wafers are produced via partner-manufacturing. Okmetic has a global customer base and sales network based in Finland, Germany, France, the United States, Japan, Singapore and China. In addition, the company has sales agent in Korea. The company's headquarters is located in Finland, where the majority of the company's silicon wafers are manufactured.The company also has contract manufacturing in Japan and China.

Okmetic was listed on Nasdaq Helsinki Ltd under the trading code OKM1V before it was acquired in 2016 by China's National Silicon Industry Group (NSIG).

== History ==
Okmetic was established in 1985 as a joint venture between Nokia, a leading Finnish telecommunications company, and Outokumpu, a major Finnish mining and metallurgy corporation. The company originated from collaborative research and pilot manufacturing projects at Helsinki University of Technology in the late 1970s and early 1980s, which successfully demonstrated the feasibility of high-quality silicon crystal growth in Finland. Early support from the Finnish Ministry of Trade and Industry and active involvement by both Nokia and Outokumpu led to the formal founding of Okmetic in March 1985, with the company registration completed that May.

The first production facility, a crystal growth and wafer factory, was opened in Espoo in 1987. Okmetic's operations expanded in the following decade, with the commissioning of its Vantaa plant in 1997, which later became the company's main production site. In 1999, the company established sales offices in North America and Asia.

Okmetic was listed on the Helsinki Stock Exchange (Nasdaq Helsinki) in 2000. In 2001, Okmetic began the volume production of silicon-on-insulator (SOI) wafers, a technology that would become central to its role as a specialty wafer supplier for MEMS, sensors, and RF devices.

In 2016, Okmetic was acquired by China's National Silicon Industry Group (NSIG) and subsequently delisted from Nasdaq Helsinki. NSIG maintained Okmetic’s existing management, committed to preserving the company's operations and workforce in Finland, and announced support for further investments in research, development, and plant expansion. Since the acquisition, Okmetic has significantly increased its capacity, investing in production technology and cleanroom space, most recently launching a major €400 million expansion of the Vantaa site, which is expected to more than double capacity and create hundreds of new jobs.
