= Pioneer Bank =

Community bank headquartered in Roswell, New Mexico

- Industry: Financial services
- Founded: February 18, 1901; 125 years ago (as Roswell Building & Loan Association)
- Headquarters: Roswell, New Mexico, United States
- Number of locations: 11 branches (2025)
- Key people: Christopher Palmer (President and CEO)
- Services: Banking services
- Website: www.pioneer.bank

Pioneer Bank is an American community bank headquartered in Roswell, New Mexico and operating across the state of New Mexico. The institution was founded in 1901 as the Roswell Building & Loan Association. As of 2026, Christopher Palmer serves as President and Chief Executive Officer.

== History ==
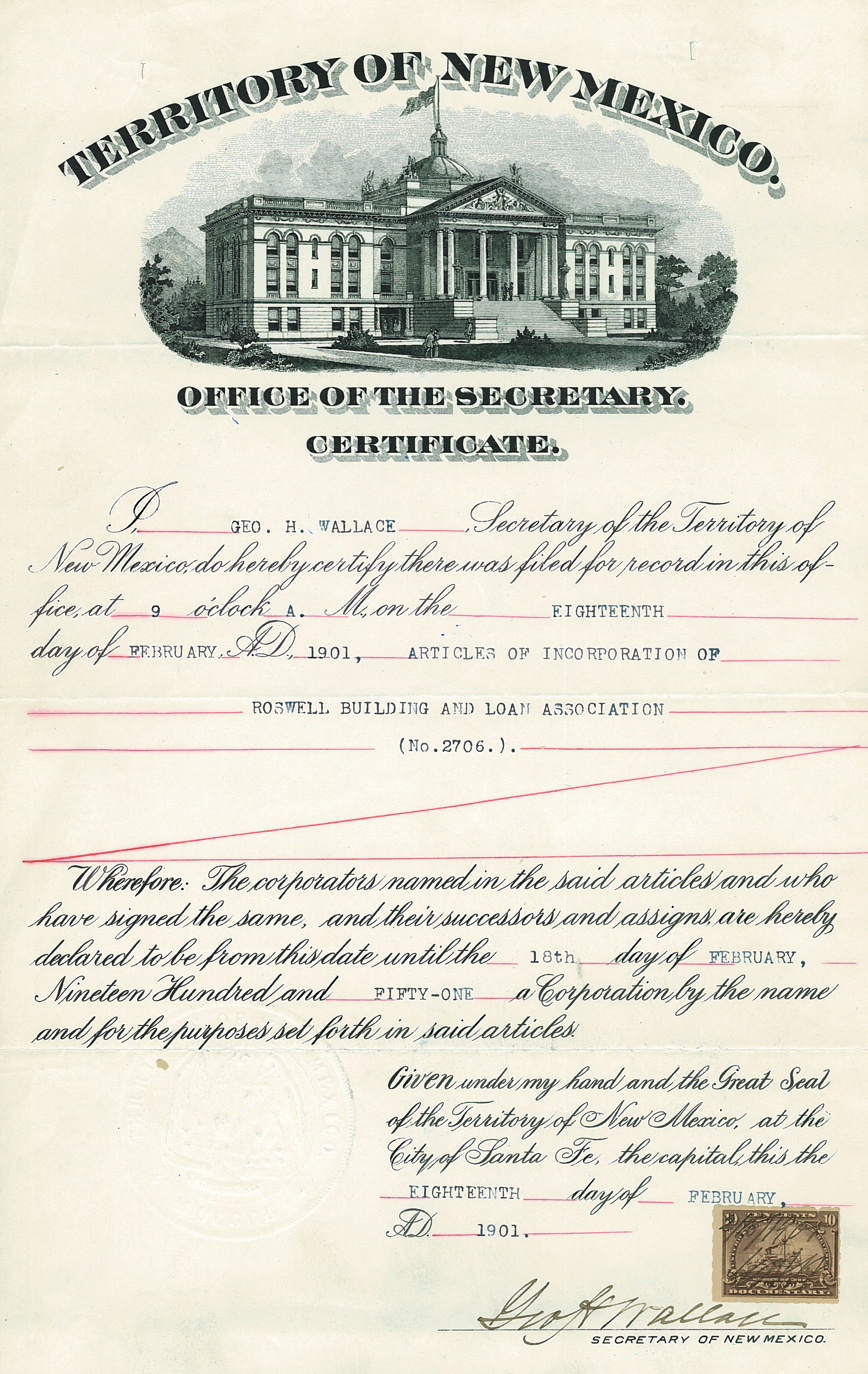
Pioneer Bank historic charter from 1901

Pioneer Bank traces its origins to February 1901, when it opened as the Roswell Building & Loan Association to provide capital for home construction in Roswell. The initial stockholders’ meeting was held on December 27, 1900, and the charter and bylaws were approved on April 5, 1901. Early leadership included D. S. Rosenwald as president and directors such as W. T. Jones, J. M. Hervey, and L. K. McGaffey. James F. Hinkle served as president of the institution from 1935 to 1951.

The institution adopted several names over time:

- 1967: Roswell Savings & Loan Association
- 1975: Pioneer Savings and Trust (following a merger with Equitable Building & Loan Association)
- 1994: Pioneer Savings Bank
- 2000: Pioneer Bank

The bank reported assets of $861.653 million as of the end of 2020.

== Locations ==
As of 2025, the bank reported 11 locations in New Mexico. A 2025 profile by the Carlsbad Department of Development described the bank as operating in Carlsbad and having branches in Alamogordo, Hobbs, Las Cruces, Roswell, and Ruidoso.

== Community involvement ==
The bank operates a philanthropic initiative known as Team Pioneer, described in reporting as supporting local nonprofit organizations. The Carlsbad Department of Development profile also noted employee involvement in community volunteer efforts in the Carlsbad area.

== Recognition ==
In 2025, the Albuquerque Journal reported that Pioneer Bank placed second in the midsize category of its New Mexico Top Workplaces awards.

Pioneer Bank has also been listed by Forbes in its annual Best-In-State Banks rankings, which evaluate customer satisfaction, trust, and financial products through consumer surveys conducted in partnership with Statista.

== See also ==
- List of banks in the United States
