= Denver College of Nursing =

For-profit nursing school in Denver, Colorado, US

Coordinates: 39.7530°N 104.9947°W

- Former names: Denver School of Nursing
- Type: Private for-proit
- Established: July 1, 2003
- Accreditation: Accrediting Commission of Career Schools and Colleges; Higher Learning Commission; Accreditation Commission for Education in Nursing
- Affiliations: Education Affiliates
- Students: 1,008
- Location: 1401 19th Street, Denver, Colorado, 80202, United States
- Campus: Urban
- Website: www.denvercollegeofnursing.edu

Denver College of Nursing is an American private for-profit nursing school based in Denver, Colorado. It was established in 2003 and has since added a campus in Houston, Texas. The college offers associate's, bachelor's, and master's degrees in nursing.

== History ==
Denver College of Nursing originated as the Denver School of Nursing in Denver, Colorado on July 1, 2003. It was founded by the Professional Education Corporation as a private for-profit nursing school. In July 2007, Education Affiliates purchased the Denver School of Nursing. Its name was changed to Denver College of Nursing in July 2017.

== Campus ==
The campus of Denver College of Nursing is located at 1401 19th Street in Denver, Colorado 80202. It has a second campus as 1155 Dairy Ashford in Houston Texas. The college also offers virtual learning.

== Academics ==
Denver College of Nursing offers a bachelor's degree or an associate degree in nursing, with an emphasis in registered nursing, nursing administration, nursing research, or clinical nursing. It also offers a Master of Science in nursing. U.S. News & World Report ranked the Denver College of Nursing at #427 in its ranking of nursing schools for 2026.

Denver College of Nursing was accredited by the Accrediting Commission of Career Schools and Colleges in 2006. It is also accredited by the Higher Learning Commission and the Accreditation Commission for Education in Nursing.

Denver College of Nursing has a chapter of Sigma Theta Tau honor society for nursing.

== Students ==
Denver College of Nursing had 949 undergraduate students and 59 graduate students in 2023. Of those students, 50 percent were White, 20 percent were Hispanic, 14 percent were Black, 7 percent were Asian, 5 percent were two or more races, 1 percent were American Indian, I percent were Pacific Islander, and 3 percent were unknown. Its students body is 86 percent female and 14 percent male.

== See also ==
- List of for-profit universities and colleges
- List of nursing schools in the United States
- List of smoke-free colleges and universities
