= IMA (company) =

Multinational Italian company

IMA S.p.A.
- IMA Logo
- Type: Public (Borsa Italiana)
- Industry: Industrial machine
- Founded: Ozzano dell'Emilia (1961)
- Founder: Andrea Romagnoli
- Headquarters: Ozzano dell'Emilia, Metropolitan City of Bologna, Italy
- Area served: Worldwide
- Key people: Alberto Vacchi (CEO)
- Revenue: 1,500 million euro
- Number of employees: 6234 (2021)
- Website: www.imagroup.com

IMA – Industria Macchine Automatiche S.p.A. is a multinational Italian company based in the Metropolitan City of Bologna, Italy. Established in 1961, IMA Group is a leader in the design and manufacture of automatic machines for the processing and packaging of pharmaceuticals, cosmetics, food, tobacco, tea and coffee.

Alberto Vacchi is both president and CEO of the company.

== Products ==
It designs and manufactures automatic machines for the processing and packaging of pharmaceuticals, cosmetics, tea and coffee. It specializes in tea bagging and coffee pod machines, solid dose manufacturing, sterile processing equipment, liquid filling, freeze-drying, labelling, blistering, counting, tube filling, end-of-line and cartoning machines.

== Manufacturing ==
It has local production plants in Bologna and Florence in Italy along with other manufacturing sites in Germany, France, Switzerland, Spain, United Kingdom, U.S.A., India, Malaysia and China. More than 5,000 are employed in the company, 2,600 of those work abroad.

Its annual turnover in 2016 was €1.310,55 million. Its employees number more than 5,000 (with about 2,600 outside of Italy) in 41 manufacturing sites in Italy, Germany, France, Switzerland, Spain, the UK, the US, India, Malaysia, China and Argentina. Its sales network covers more than 80 countries.

The Group has around 6,000 employees, of which over 2,800 overseas, and has 45 production plants in Italy, Germany, France, Switzerland, Spain, United Kingdom, United States, India, Malaysia, China and Argentina. IMA has an extensive commercial network, which consists of 29 branches with sales and assistance services in Italy, France, Switzerland, United Kingdom, Germany, Austria, Spain, Poland, Israel, Russia, United States, India, China, Malaysia, Thailand and Brazil, representative offices in Central and Eastern European countries and more than 50 agencies covering a total of about 80 countries. In addition, in 2019, it had a turnover of 1,595.5 million euros, of which about 90% outside Italy.

== Board of directors ==
The board of directors is composed of thirteen members, in office until the approval of the financial statements at 31 December 2020, with Alberto Vacchi in the role of chairman and executive CEO. Marco Vacchi is the honorary president.

== Main shareholders ==
On 14 June 2016 the share capital amounts to €20,415,200.00 and is divided into 39,260,000 ordinary shares with a nominal value of €0.52

- SO.FI.M.A. Società Finanziaria Macchine Automatiche S.p.A. - 56,789% (22.295.194 shares)
  - Lopam Fin S.p.A. - 50%
  - Cofiva (Dichiarante) - 24,65%
    - Cofiva Holding spa - 99,9%
      - Gianluca Vacchi - 55%
- Hydra S.p.A. - 2,003% (737.665 shares)
