= Calderara di Reno =

Calderara
- Comune
- Comune di Calderara di Reno
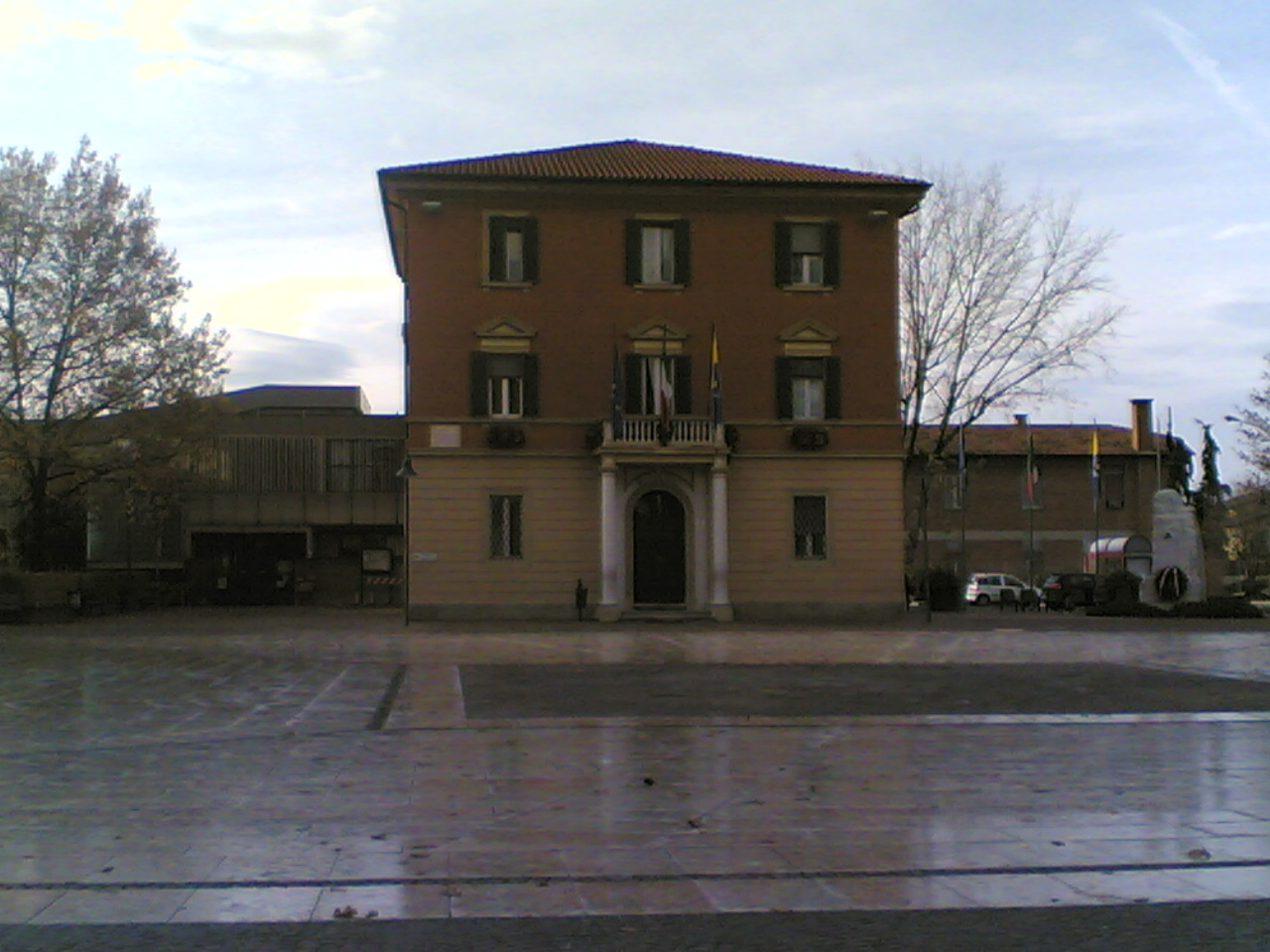
- Town hall.

- Coat of arms

- Location within Italy Location within Emilia-Romagna
- Coordinates: 44°34′N 11°16′E
- Country: Italy
- Region: Emilia-Romagna
- Metropolitan city: Bologna (BO)
- Frazioni: Bargellino, Castel Campeggi, Lippo, Longara, Sacerno, Tavernelle

Government
  - Mayor: Irene Priolo

Area
  - Total: 40.75 km^{2} (15.73 sq mi)
- Elevation: 30 m (98 ft)

Population (30 April 2017)
  - Total: 13,260
  - Density: 325.4/km^{2} (842.8/sq mi)
- Demonym: Calderaresi
- Time zone: UTC+1 (CET)
  - Summer (DST): UTC+2 (CEST)
- Postal code: 40012
- Dialing code: 051
- Patron saint: St. Petronius
- Saint day: October 4
- Website: Official website

Calderara di Reno (Bolognese: Caldarèra) is a comune (municipality) in the Metropolitan City of Bologna in the Italian region Emilia-Romagna, located about 10 kilometres (6 mi) northwest of Bologna.

The frazione of Sacerno is usually considered the place where, in 43 BC, Octavian, Mark Antony and Lepidus met to set the Second Triumvirate.
