= Structured settlement =

Negotiated financial or insurance arrangement

A structured settlement is a negotiated financial or insurance arrangement through which a claimant agrees to resolve a personal injury tort claim by receiving part or all of a settlement in the form of periodic payments on an agreed schedule, rather than as a lump sum. As part of the negotiations, a structured settlement may be offered by the defendant or requested by the plaintiff. Ultimately both parties must agree on the terms of settlement. A settlement may allow the parties to a lawsuit to reduce legal and other costs by avoiding trial. Structured settlements are most widely used in the United States, but are also utilized in Canada, the United Kingdom and Australia.

Structured settlements were first utilized in Canada as part of the settlement of birth defect claims arising out of pregnant mothers ingesting Thalidomide. Structured settlements are now used in a wide variety of types of lawsuit settlements such as aviation, construction, auto, medical malpractice and product liability.

Structured settlements may include income tax and spendthrift provisions. Often the periodic payments will be funded through the purchase of one or more annuities, that generate the future payments. Structured settlement payments are sometimes called periodical payments, and when incorporated into a trial judgment may be called a "structured judgment".

== United States ==
Structured settlements became more popular in the United States during the 1970s as an alternative to lump sum settlements. The increased popularity was due to several rulings by the Internal Revenue Service (IRS), an increase in personal injury awards, and higher interest rates. The IRS rulings stated that if certain requirements were met, claimants would owe no federal income tax on the amounts received. Higher interest rates result in lower present values, hence lower cost of funding of future periodic payments.

In the United States, structured settlement laws and regulations have been enacted at both the federal and the state levels. Federal structured settlement laws include various provisions of the Internal Revenue Code. State structured settlement laws include structured settlement protection statutes and periodic payment of judgment statutes. There are 47 states with structured settlement protection acts, created by a model promulgated by the National Conference of Insurance Legislators ("NCOIL"). Of the 47 states, 37 are based in whole or in part on the NCOIL model act. Medicaid and Medicare laws and regulations affect structured settlements. A structured settlement may be used in conjunction with settlement planning tools that help preserve a claimant's Medicare benefits. A Structured Medicare Set Aside Arrangement (MSA) generally costs less than a non-structured MSA because of amortization of the future cash flow over the claimant's life expectancy, as opposed to funding all the payments otherwise due in the future in a single non-discounted sum today.

Structured settlements have been endorsed by many of the nation's largest disability rights organizations, including the American Association of People with Disabilities, and for a time there was a Congressional Structured Settlement Caucus.

=== Legal structure ===
The typical structured settlement arises and is structured as follows: An injured party (the claimant) comes to a negotiated settlement of a tort suit with the defendant (or its insurance carrier) pursuant to a settlement agreement that provides as consideration, in exchange for the claimant's securing the dismissal of the lawsuit, an agreement by the defendant (or, more commonly, its insurer) to make a series of periodic payments.

If any of the periodic payments are life-contingent (i.e. the obligation to make a payment is contingent on someone continuing to be alive), then the claimant (or whoever is determined to be the measuring life) is named as the annuitant or measuring life under the annuity. In some instances the purchasing company may purchase a life insurance policy as a hedge in case of death in a settlement transfer.

==== Assigned cases ====
The defendant, or the property/casualty insurance company, generally assigns its periodic payment obligation to a third party by way of a qualified assignment ("assigned case"). An assignment is said to be "qualified" if it satisfies the criteria set forth in Internal Revenue Code Section 130. Qualification of the assignment is important to assignment companies because without it the amount they receive to induce them to accept periodic payment obligations would be considered income for federal income tax purposes. If an assignment qualifies under Section 130, however, the amount received is excluded from the income of the assignment company. This provision of the tax code was enacted to encourage assigned cases; without it, assignment companies would owe federal income taxes but would typically have no source from which to make the payments.

The qualified assignment company receives money from the defendant or property/casualty insurer, and in turn purchases a "qualified funding asset" to finance the assigned periodic payment obligation. Pursuant to IRC 130(d) a "qualified funding asset" may be an annuity or an obligation of the United States government.

In an assigned case, the defendant or property/casualty company does not wish to retain the long-term periodic payment obligation on its books. Accordingly, the defendant or property/casualty insurer transfers the obligation, through a legal device called a qualified assignment, to a third party. The third party, called an assignment company, will require the defendant or property/casualty company to pay it an amount sufficient to enable it to buy an annuity that will fund its newly accepted periodic payment obligation. If the claimant consents to the transfer of the periodic payment obligation (either in the settlement agreement or, failing that, in a special form of qualified assignment known as a qualified assignment and release), the defendant and/or its property/casualty company has no further liability to make the periodic payments. This method of substituting the obligor is desirable for defendants or property/casualty companies that do not want to retain the periodic payment obligation on their books. A qualified assignment is also advantageous for the claimant as it will not have to rely on the continued credit of the defendant or property/casualty company as a general creditor. Typically, an assignment company is an affiliate of the life insurance company from which the annuity is purchased.

==== Unassigned cases ====
In the less common unassigned case, the defendant or property/casualty insurer retains the periodic payment obligation and funds it by purchasing an annuity from a life insurance company, thereby offsetting its obligation with a matching asset. The payment stream purchased under the annuity matches exactly, in timing and amounts, the periodic payments agreed to in the settlement agreement. The defendant or property/casualty company owns the annuity and names the claimant as the payee under the annuity, thereby directing the annuity issuer to send payments directly to the claimant. One of the reasons an unassigned case is less popular is that the obligation is not truly off the books, and the defendant or casualty insurer retains a contingent liability. While a default is a rare occurrence, contingent liability did come into play with the liquidation of Executive Life Insurance Company of New York. Some annuitants suffered shortfalls, and a number of obligors at the wrong end of unassigned cases made up the difference.

=== Tax issues ===
In 1982, Congress adopted special tax rules to encourage the use of structured settlements to provide long-term financial security to seriously injured victims and their families. These structured settlement rules, as codified in the enactment of the Periodic Payment Settlement Act of 1982, which established Section 130 of the Internal Revenue Code of 1986 (IRC) and in amendments to section 104(a)(2) of the Code, have been in place working effectively since then. In the Taxpayer Relief Act of 1997, Congress extended the structured settlements to worker's compensation to cover physical injuries suffered in the workplace. A "structured settlement" under the tax code's terms is an "arrangement" that meets the following requirements.

Damages on the account of personal physical injury, physical sickness and workers compensation are income tax free due to exclusions provided in IRC section 104. The structured settlement tax rules enacted by Congress lay down a bright line path for a structured settlement. Once the plaintiff and defense have settled the tort claim in exchange for periodic payments to be made by the defendant (or the defendant's insurer), the full amount of the periodic payments constitutes tax-free damages to the victim. The defendant, or its insurer, may assign its periodic payment obligation to a qualified assignment company (typically a single purpose affiliate of a life insurer) that funds its assumed obligation with an annuity purchased from its affiliated life insurer. The rules also permit the assignee to fund its periodic payment obligation under the structured settlement via U.S. Treasury obligations. However, this U.S. Treasury obligation approach is used much less frequently because of lower returns and the relative inflexibility of payment schedules available under Treasury obligations. In this way, with a qualified assignment, there is a legal novation, the defendant or insurer can close its books on the liability, and the claimant can receive the long-term financial security of an annuity (or annuities) issued by one or more financially strong life insurance companies.

What makes this work is the tax exclusion to the qualified assignment company afforded by IRC section 130. Without the tax exclusion, the cost of assignment would be higher, because the assignment company would need to recognize the premium as income. The resulting net after tax amount would be insufficient to fund the assumed obligation.

To qualify for special tax treatment, a structured settlement must meet the following requirements:

- A structured settlement must be established by:
  - A suit or agreement for periodic payment of damages excludable from gross income under Internal Revenue Code Section 104(a)(2) (26 U.S.C. § 104(a)(2)); or
  - An agreement for the periodic payment of compensation under any workers' compensation law excludable under Internal Revenue Code Section 104(a)(1) (26 U.S.C. § 104(a)(1)); and
- The periodic payments must be of the character described in subparagraphs (A) and (B) of Internal Revenue Code Section 130(c)(2) (26 U.S.C. § 130(c)(2))) and must be payable by a person who:
  - Is a party to the suit or agreement or to a workers' compensation claim; or
  - By a person who has assumed the liability for such periodic payments under a qualified assignment in accordance with Internal Revenue Code Section 130 (26 U.S.C. § 130).

=== Sales of rights to structured settlement payments ===
A claimant who has agreed to a negotiated structured settlement elects to receive part of their settlement money at the time of settlement, and part of their settlement money in the future through a negotiated, customized schedule of periodic payments that are "fixed and determinable as to amount and time of payment." The life insurance companies who underwrite these periodic payment obligations and the associated qualified assignment companies, must comply with the Internal Revenue Code 130, which, in part, does not allow for acceleration or modification of payments. Options exist for structured settlement annuitants to sell or transfer the rights to future periodic payments to purchasers of structured settlement payment rights, mostly known as structured settlement factoring companies. Some life insurers, such as Berkshire Hathaway Life Insurance Company of Nebraska, and former structured annuity issuers Allstate Life Insurance Company and Symetra, offer to buy part or all of one's structured settlement payment rights in return for a lump sum cash provided such transaction complies with IRC §5891.

Although many beneficiaries of a structured settlement find that the settlement suits their needs, some may experience changed financial circumstances and find themselves unable to obtain funds through conventional financing or other sources. They may want to obtain funds from the structured settlement in order to pay down debt, help pay for a house, help pay for a child's college tuition, or for other significant financial needs. At the same time, companies that buy structured settlements have been known to take advantage of beneficiaries' circumstances in order to obtain the settlements for a relatively small price.

The act of the sale and purchase of structured settlement payment rights is known as a structured settlement factoring transaction. For example, a structured settlement payment stream of 20 years could be transferred in exchange for one discounted payment now.

Any sale of structured settlement payment rights will require the approval of a judge to comply with the local state structured settlement protection act and IRC 5891. Enforcement of structured settlement Approval is not a given. In 2012, a Tennessee Chancery Court issued an order denying a payee's transfer of workers' compensation settlement payments under a structured settlement agreement. Judge William E. Lantrip held that (i) workers' compensation payments are not within the definition of "structured settlement " under the Tennessee Structured Settlement Protection Act, Tenn. Code. Ann. §47-18-2601

Enforcement of the state system of structured settlement protection acts has come under heavy scrutiny after a highly publicized story of alleged abuse of a cluster of annuitants who received structured settlements as part of lead paint settlements in Baltimore City appeared in the Washington Post on August 25, 2015. leading to rapidly passed reform of the Maryland Structured Settlement Protection Act and lawsuits brought against the Chevy Chase MD company that originated the deals and a number of its executives by the Maryland Attorney General, The Consumer Financial Protection Bureau and a plaintiff's class action.

On September 14, 2017 a class action lawsuit filed in the Eastern District of Pennsylvania, alleging Portsmouth Virginia Circuit Court judges were complicit in an "Annuity Fraud Enterprise" scheme, in which a Virginia lawyer and 79th District delegate Steve Heretick was the central figure, representing JG Wentworth, Seneca One, 321 Henderson Receivables and other settlement purchasers, that allegedly violated the rights of thousands of structured settlement annuitants. Plaintiffs allege violations of RICO statutes against multiple defendants, violations of right to due process an seek a constructive trust against all defendants and all nominal defendants which include several life insurers who issue the annuities.

== United Kingdom ==
The Damages Act 1996 grants the power for courts in the United Kingdom to make periodical payments in cases of personal injury. This legislation was introduced to implement the recommendations of the Law Commission. Reforms were also made to tax law through the Finance Acts of 1995 and 1996 to ensure that payments made under structured settlements are tax free. As applied to England and Wales, Part 41 of the Civil Procedure Rules along with the accompanying Practice Direction 41B set out the factors the court is to use to assess whether to make an order for periodical payment.

The law in Scotland slightly differs from the law in England, Wales and Northern Ireland: in Scotland, courts may only order periodical payments with the consent of the parties, while in the rest of the UK, courts can make an order for it with or without consent. In 2019, the Scottish Parliament passed the Damages (Investment Returns and Periodical Payments) (Scotland) Act 2019 to amend the rules concerning periodical payments.

== See also ==
- Annuity (financial contracts)
- Internal Revenue Code
- Medicaid
- Secondary market annuity
- Structured sale
- Structured settlement factoring transaction
- Loan servicing
