= Ernest Lenard Hall =

American robotic engineer (born 1940)

Ernest L. Hall
- Born: December 8, 1940 (age 85); Naylor, Missouri, U.S.
- Education: University of Missouri
- Scientific career
- Fields: Robotics
- Workplaces: University of Cincinnati College of Engineering

Ernest Lenard (Ernie) Hall, PhD, PE, is Professor Emeritus of Mechanical Engineering and Computer Science in the School of Dynamic Systems in the College of Engineering and Applied Science at the University of Cincinnati. He was also the Paul E. Geier Professor of Robotics in the Department of Mechanical Engineering at the University of Cincinnati. He has also held joint appointments at the University of Cincinnati with the Department of Electrical and Computer Engineering and Computer Science. He regularly collaborates with faculty and students in other colleges at University of Cincinnati, as well as civic groups, including the FIRST Lego League Challenge, the Ohio Academy of Science, and the Society of Manufacturing Engineers (Chapter 21). While consulting with the Oak Ridge National Laboratory, he became interested in efforts to make useful robots for some of the dangerous tasks encountered by the Department of Energy, Department of Defense and NASA. He noted the importance of combining image processing algorithms with manipulators and controller to build intelligent robots, especially in automatic target recognition. He has founded and has co-chaired an annual conference on Intelligent Robots and Computer Vision for the past 25 years to provide a forum for new innovations in this field. He sits as the first Paul. E. Geier Professor of Robotics at the University of Cincinnati. At the University of Cincinnati, he established the Center for Robotics Research, which encourages robotics activities in industry, medicine, defense, and even at home with projects like a robot lawn mower. He also founded the UC Robot Team that has participated in the Intelligent Ground Vehicle Competition for the past 15 years and the DARPA Grand Challenge in 2005 and 2007. He has also served as a judge for the Cincinnati FIRST Lego League Challenge for two years and has been called the Woodie Flowers of Cincinnati for giving the Gracious Professionalism award. In 2006, Ernest L. Hall won the Grand Prize in the "Made in Express" contest sponsored by Microsoft. His entry for the contest was an all-terrain self-maneuverable robot developed using Microsoft Visual Studio Express. He donated the $10,000 cash prize from the contest back to the University of Cincinnati to support robotics.

== Education ==
Ernie Hall received a B.S. in 1965 and an M.S. in 1966, both in electrical engineering, from the University of Missouri in Columbia, Missouri under the Naval Enlisted Scientific Education Program (NESEP) sponsored by the United States Marine Corps. He completed both degrees in four years. He then attended Officer Candidate School and joined the 1st Marine Aircraft Wing as a radar officer. Following an honorable discharge of his military service, he returned to the University of Missouri in 1968 and received his Ph.D. in Bioengineering in 1971. His dissertation, Digital Filtering of Images extended the concepts of digital signal processing, including recursive filtering, from signal processing to the enhancement of two dimensional images and other applications of image measurements in radiology.

== Career ==
Ernie Hall joined the Radiology Department at Yale University, where he also taught in the Department of Computer Science. At Yale, his primary focus was in diagnostic radiography (see Radiography) such as the automated diagnosis of coal workers pneumoconiosis, but he also became interested in the new field of computed tomography. In 1973, he joined the Signal and Image Processing Institute (SIPI) at the University of Southern California that had been recently formed with support from a DARPA grant to develop computer imaging technologies. In 1976 he joined the University of Tennessee the Image and Pattern Analysis Laboratory. While in Knoxville, Tennessee, he consulted with the Oak Ridge National Laboratory. In 1983, he became the first Paul. E. Geier Professor of Robotics in the Department of Mechanical Engineering at the University of Cincinnati. At the University of Cincinnati, he established the Center for Robotics Research and founded the UC Robot Team.

== Memberships ==
Ernie Hall is or has been a member of the following professional organizations: IEEE (Life Fellow), SME (Fellow), SPIE (Fellow), Ohio Academy of Science (Fellow), American Society of Mechanical Engineers, Institute of Industrial Engineers, Sigma Xi, Tau Beta Pi, Pi Mu Eplison, and Eta Kappa Nu. He is also a Certified Manufacturing Engineer and is registered as a Professional Engineer in Missouri, California, Tennessee, and Ohio. He was also a member of the Microscopy Society of America, being elected the president of the organization in 2013.

== Awards ==
Ernie Hall has received numerous professional awards, which include the following: Master Educator Award College of Engineering (2007), Fellow Award from the Ohio Academy of Science (2005), Diversity in Teaching Award from the University of Cincinnati (2004), Dean's Award for Innovation in Teaching from the College of Engineering (2003), Scientists and Engineers of Cincinnati Academic Award (2003), M. Eugene Merchant Manufacturing Textbook Award from the Society of Manufacturing Engineers (2002) for Handbook of Industrial Automation, SME Fellow Award (1998), SME Certification by Stature Award (1988), SPIE Fellow Award (1986), IEEE Fellow Award (1985), IEEE Centennial Medal (1984), Brooks Distinguished Faculty Award for Excellence in Teaching and Distinction in Engineering Practice from the University of Tennessee (1982), IBM Professor and Member of Engineering Academy (1982), and Tennessee Tomorrow Award from the University of Tennessee (1980).

== Books and chapters ==
Ernie Hall has written, edited or contributed chapters to the following books:

- Hall, E. L., ed. (2010). Advances in Robot Manipulators. InTech. ISBN 978-953-307-070-4.
- Shell, R. L.; Hall, E. L. (2000). Handbook of Industrial Automation. Marcel Dekker. ISBN 978-0-8247-0373-8.
- Hall, Ernest L. (1999). Sadjadi, Firooz A. (ed.). Automatic Target Recognition. SPIE. ISBN 978-0-8194-3219-3.
- Hall, E. L.; Hall, B. C. (1985). Robotics: A User Friendly Introduction. Holt, Rinehart and Winston. ISBN 978-0-03-069718-0.
- Hall, E. L. (1979). Computer Image Processing and Recognition. Academic Press. ISBN 978-0-12-318850-2.
- Hall, Ernest L. (1994). "Fundamental Principles of Robot Vision". In Young, Tzay Y. (ed.). Handbook of Pattern Recognition and Image Processing. Morgan Kaufmann Publishers. pp. 543–575. ISBN 978-0-12-774561-9.
- Hall, Ernest L.; Roning, J.J. (1994). "Algorithms and Architectures for Machine Vision". In White, J.A.; Pence, I.W. (eds.). Progress in Material Handling and Logistics. Springer-Verlag. pp. 59–74. ISBN 978-3-540-53442-6.
- Hall, Ernest L. (1989). "Vision Sensing Techniques". In Heer, E.; Lum, H. (eds.). Progress in Astronautics and Aeronautics. AIAA. pp. 59–74.
- Hall, Ernest L.; McPherson, C.A. (1985). "Three Dimensional Robot Vision Techniques". In Bene, G.; Hackwood, S. (eds.). Recent Advances in Robotics. Wiley. pp. 263–312.
- Hall, Ernest L.; Frykman, G.K.; Wood, V.E. (1977). "Axon Counting Techniques for Nerve Regeneration". In Omer, George E. Jr.; Spinner, Morton (eds.). Management of Peripheral Nerve Problems. Philadelphia: W.B. Saunders Co. pp. 263–312.
- Hall, Ernest L.; Huth, G.C. (1977). "Computed Tomography and its Application to Nuclear Medicine Imaging". In Potchen, E.James (ed.). Current Concepts in Radiology. St. Louis: C.V. Mosby Co. pp. 263–312. ISBN 978-0-8016-3987-6.
- Hall, Ernest L.; Lynch, D.D.; Dwyer, S.J. (1977). "Computer Multiplication and Division Using Binary Logarithms for Digital Filtering Applications". In Salazar, A.C. (ed.). Digital Signal Processing. IEEE Press. pp. 263–312.
- Hall, Ernest L.; Pinkel, S. (1977). "Collaborative work". In Newman, Thelma R. (ed.). Innovative Printmaking: The Making of Two and Three Dimensional Prints and Multiples. Crown Publishing Group.
- Hall, Ernest L. (1978). "Five papers". In Andrews, H.C. (ed.). Tutorial and Selected Papers in Digital Signal Processing. IEEE Press.

== Patents ==
- Omnidirectional Vision System for Mobile Robots
- Guiding an Unmanned Vehicle by Reference to Overhead Features
- Method and Apparatus for Palletizing Randomly Arriving Mixed Size and Content Parcels
