= William Dember =

American psychologist (1928–2006)

- Born: William Norton Dember; 1928; Waterbury, Connecticut
- Died: 2006 (aged 77–78)
- Education: Yale College; University of Michigan
- Known for: Work on the psychology of perception
- Scientific career
- Fields: Psychology
- Institutions: University of Cincinnati
- Thesis: Decision-time and psychological distance (1955)

William Norton Dember (1928 – 2006) was an American experimental psychologist who taught at the University of Cincinnati from 1959 to 1998. He is particularly recognized for his research on perception and on the integration of multiple seemingly separate disciplines of psychology.

Born in 1928 in Waterbury, Connecticut, Dember received his AB degree from Yale College in 1950. He then attended the University of Michigan, from which he received his MA degree in 1951 and his PhD in 1955. He first joined the University of Cincinnati faculty as an assistant professor in 1959, and was promoted to associate professor and director of graduate training there in 1962. He became a full professor at the University of Cincinnati in 1965 and headed its Department of Psychology from 1968 to 1976, and again from 1979 to 1981. He was the dean of the University of Cincinnati College of Arts and Sciences from 1981 to 1986. He retired from the university in 1998.
