= Clarence Cory =

American engineer and educator

Clarence Linus Cory (September 4, 1872 – August 2, 1937) was an American engineer and educator who is known as the father of electrical engineering at the University of California, Berkeley.

== Early life ==
Cory was born in Lafayette, Indiana, to Thomas Cory and Carrie Stoney. Cory's father was an inventor and served as a topographer in the Union Army during the American Civil War.

== Education ==
In 1889, Cory received a degree of bachelor of mechanical engineering in electrical engineering from Purdue University at the age of 16. In 1891 he received a degree of master of mechanical engineering from Cornell University.

== Career ==
Cory was appointed to a position of professor of electrical engineering at Highland Park College in Des Moines, Iowa, in 1891. In 1892, he became the first professor of mechanical and electrical engineering at University of California, Berkeley.

During his early years at Berkeley, Cory established Electrical Laboratories that supplied light and power to the entire Berkeley campus. During a sabbatical leave in 1900 he became a co-founder of engineering firm Cory, Meredith and Allen in San Francisco. In 1908, Cory was appointed the dean of College of Mechanics at Berkeley. Clarence Cory was awarded a doctoral degree in engineering from Purdue University in 1914. During World War I, Cory obtained a leave of absence from Berkeley to accept a "dollar-a-year" job of assistant director of nitrate and powder plants in West Virginia, where he was responsible for power production. He became professor emeritus in 1931.

== Personal life ==
Cory married Mayme Pritchard on December 25, 1905, in Harlan, Iowa. Cory's older brother, Harry Thomas Cory, was an industrial engineer.

Cory Hall, a building on the campus of the University of California, Berkeley, was completed in 1950 and named after Cory.

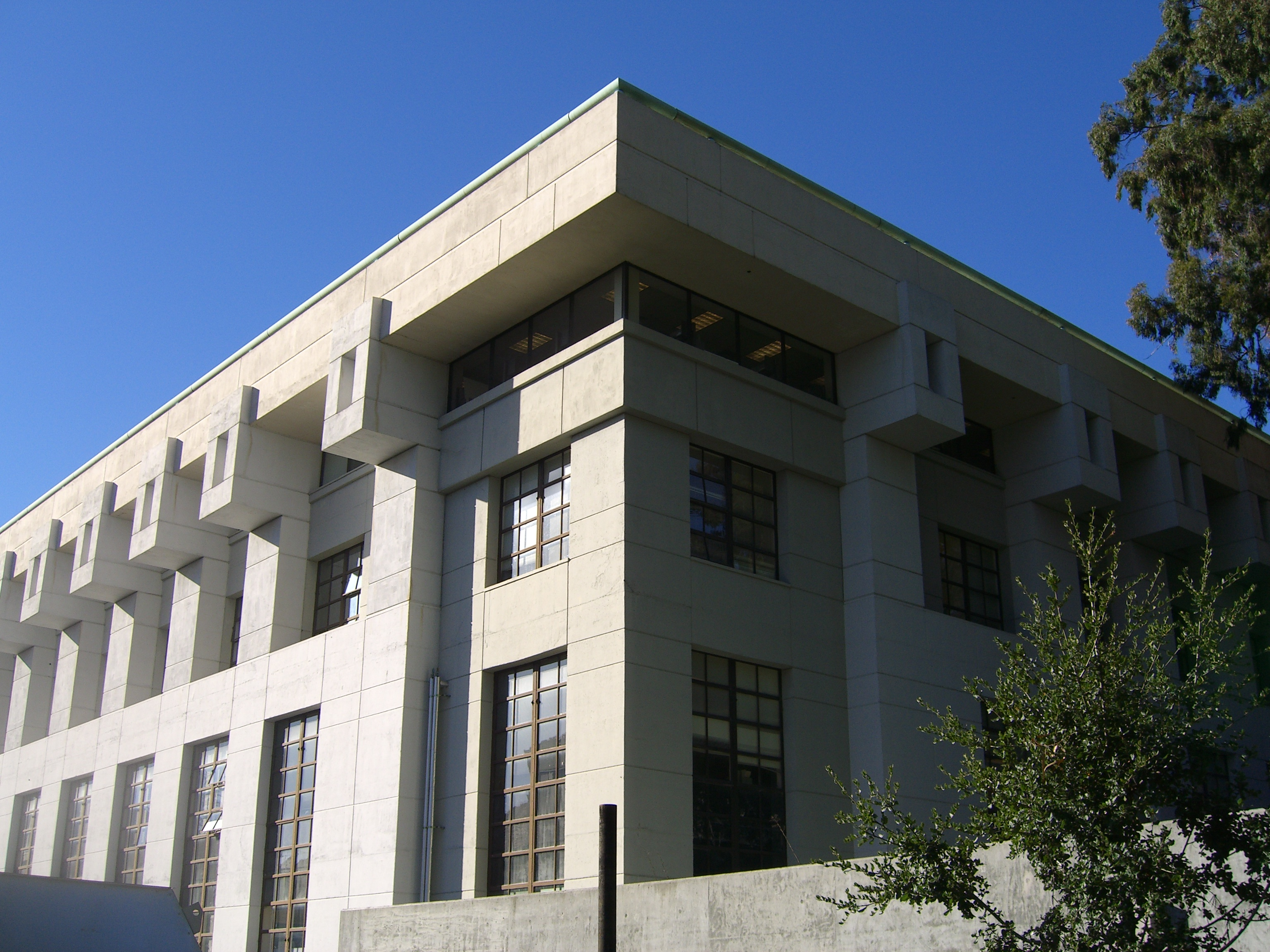
Cory Hall on the Berkeley campus
