= University of Cincinnati Blue Ash College =

Regional college in Blue Ash, Ohio, US

Coordinates: 39°14′01″N 84°24′00″W

UC Blue Ash College
- Former names: Raymond Walters College
- Type: Public regional campus
- Established: 1967
- Parent institution: University of Cincinnati
- Dean: Robin Lightner
- Students: 5,172
- Location: Blue Ash, Ohio, United States
- Website: ucblueash.edu

The University of Cincinnati Blue Ash College (formerly Raymond Walters College) is a regional campus of the University of Cincinnati and is located in Blue Ash, Ohio. It was founded in 1967 as the first regional campus of the university. With an enrollment of about 5,000 students, UC Blue Ash College is one of the largest regional colleges in Ohio.

== History ==
The University of Cincinnati created UC Blue Ash College, known then as Raymond Walters College, as a result of the federal Higher Education Act that became law in 1965. The legislation helped increase access to higher education for low and middle-income students by strengthening the educational resources for colleges and universities. In Ohio, those resources were invested into existing public universities to create regional colleges that are open access and offer low tuition.

Under the supervision of the inaugural dean, Hilmar Kreuger, the college officially opened its doors on September 25, 1967 with an enrollment of 632 students.

=== Notable milestones ===
- 1969: Dr. Ernest Muntz is named dean of the college and serves until 1990. He is the longest-tenured dean of UC Blue Ash.
- 1977: The Department of Math, Physics and Computer Science is one of the first institutions in Ohio to acquire a super-minicomputer. This technology was unparalleled in local academia at the time.
- 1997: The UC Blue Ash Study Abroad Program launches with a course in the United Kingdom. Since its founding, the program has visited over 15 countries and offered more than 50 courses.
- 2004: The college launches the Bachelor's in Radiation Science Technology program, its first bachelor's degree program.
- 2010: The UC Smiles program is created to provide free oral health check-ups to under-served school children in Greater Cincinnati at the Dental Hygiene Clinic.
- 2011: The UC Board of Trustees approve changing the name from Raymond Walters College to UC Blue Ash College.
- 2011: The college adds its second bachelor's degree, the Bachelor of Technical and Applied Science.
- 2017: Construction on Progress Hall, a 16,000 square foot building with new classrooms and faculty offices, is completed.

== Campus ==
The 135-acre campus, located in Blue Ash, Ohio, consists of six academic buildings. The University of Cincinnati purchased the land in 1965 from the City of Cincinnati.

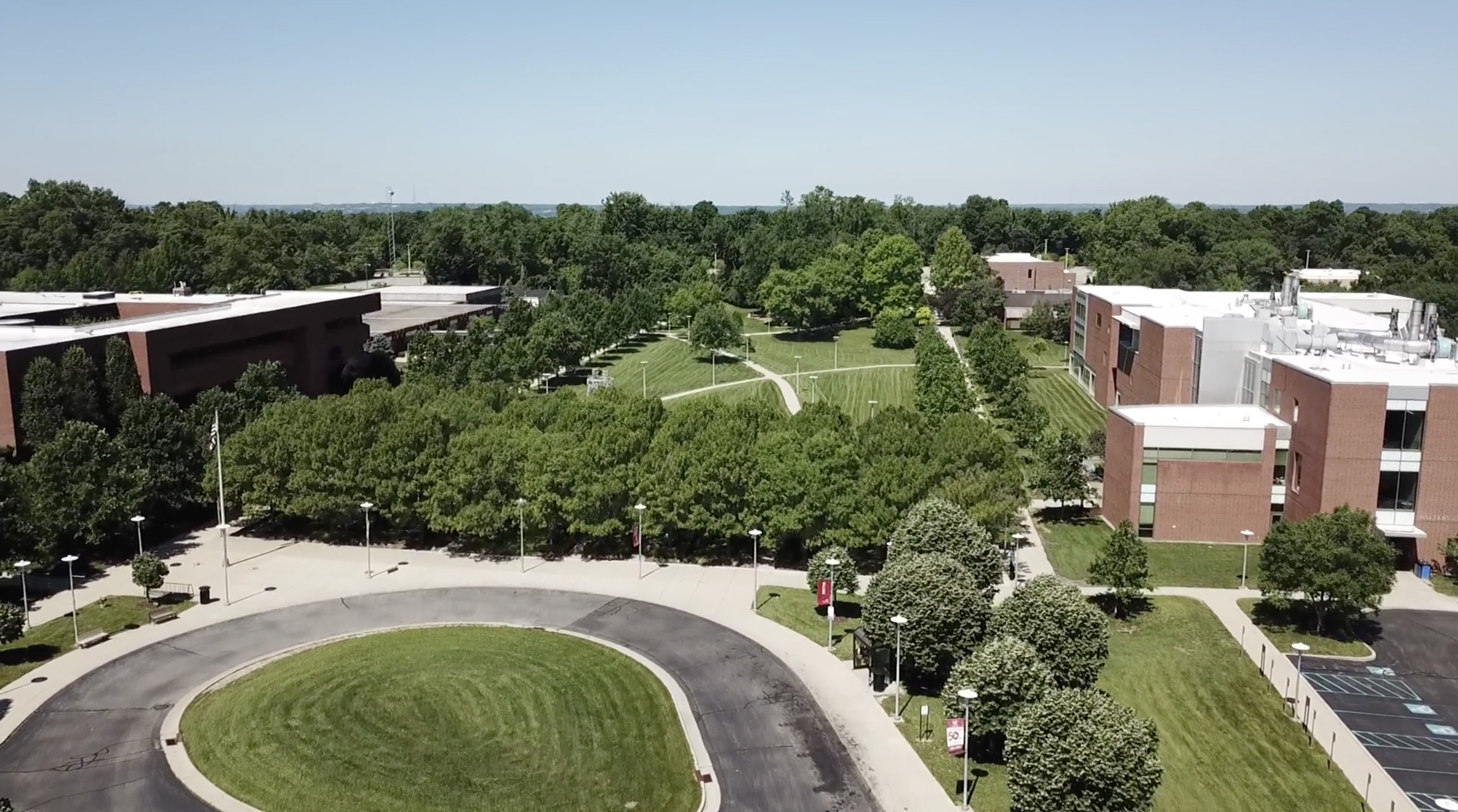
UC Blue Ash College

== Academics ==
UC Blue Ash College is accredited by the Higher Learning Commission. The college offers more than 50 academic degree and certificate programs, including two bachelor's degrees and the region's only dental hygiene program.

== Notable alumni ==
- Andrew Ciarfardini: A former member of the Ohio House of Representatives and employee of the U.S. Department of State, Ciarfardini now serves as Head of Global Corporate Affairs and Chief of Staff to the Executive Chairman and CEO for Worldpay.
- Robert L. Schuler: A former member of the Ohio House of Representatives and Ohio Senate.
