= William Phipps Blake =

American geologist (1826-1910)

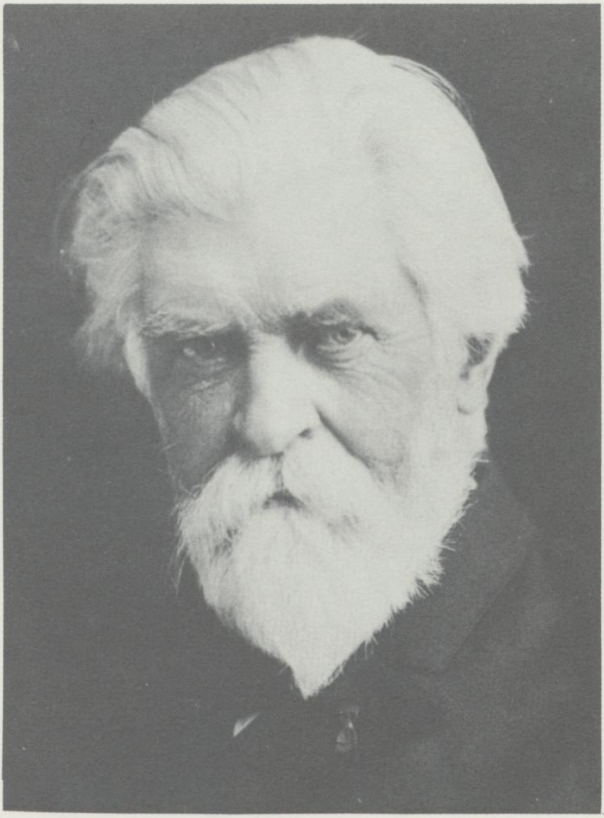
- Born: June 1, 1826; New York, New York, US
- Died: May 22, 1910 (aged 83); Berkeley, California, US
- Education: Yale University, 1852
- Occupations: Geologist, educator
- Spouse: Charlotte Haven Lord Hayes (m. 1855; died 1905)

William Phipps Blake (June 1, 1826 – May 22, 1910) was an American geologist, mining consultant, and educator. He was the first college trained chemist to work full-time for a United States chemical manufacturer (1850) and served as a geologist with the Pacific Railroad Survey of the Far West (1853–1856), where he observed and detailed a theory on erosion by wind-blown sand on the geologic formations of southern California, one of his many scientific contributions. He started several western mining enterprises that were premature, including a mining magazine in the 1850s and the first school of mines in the Far West in 1864.

From the 1850s on he published over 200 articles, several books, and numerous newspaper and mining magazine columns or short pieces on mining and geology. He served throughout his long career as a mining consultant for mining corporations in every western state and several foreign countries, including Japan. He also served as special ambassador for the nascent science of geology while serving as the United States' principal geologic exhibit commissioner for what now would be called World Fairs, from Paris in 1867, through Vienna and the centennial at Philadelphia, back to Paris in 1878. He ended his long and distinguished career as head of the school of mines at the University of Arizona, 1895–1905, remaining in an active emeritus status until his death.

== Life ==
=== Education ===
William Phipps Blake was born in New York City, entered Yale in 1846 under the guidance of Benjamin Silliman, Sr., and graduated in 1852, one of seven to get the newly created Ph.B. degree. (Although Blake has often been credited with graduation from Yale's Sheffield Scientific School, he graduated before it acquired that name.)

=== Career ===
Silliman helped Blake with his first appointments. Before graduation, Isaac Tyson, an early mining developer, hired Blake to work in his Baltimore Chrome Works, the largest of their kind at the time. Thus, Robert V. Bruce in The Launching of Modern American Science (p. 144) credits Blake as "the first college-trained chemist employed full-time in American industry." Silliman later drew Blake away to help collect specimens for a mineral exhibit in New York, a path he would take many times over the ensuing decades. Benjamin Silliman's descriptions of the collection in an 1854 article in the Mining Magazine reveals Blake's travels from the gold belt in the southern Appalachians to up-state New York and New England. He was quickly becoming one of the most informed geologists in the country. One result was an honorary M.A. from Dartmouth in 1863.

Through his Yale contacts and Spencer Baird of the Smithsonian Institution, he was selected as mineralogist and geologist of the Pacific Railroad Exploring Expedition of 1853, exploring a railroad route in southern California. He with Lt. John G Parke identified the San Gorgonio Pass as the best railroad route to the coast, which it became with the building of the Southern Pacific railroad twenty-four years later. More importantly to geologists, Blake saw the erosive power of wind-blown sand in the pass and contributed to the significant scientific debates about mountain building. Biographer David B. Dill, Jr. calls the exploration of the pass one of Blake's "crowning events" in a "long professional career rich in scientific and human values." Besides identifying geologic features along the route and exploring the mining fields of California, he was author of several of the Railroad Survey reports, which included his polished field sketches that are now sought after as works of art.

He returned to Washington, D.C., then Connecticut, and established a consultant business while also teaching occasional courses at the New York Medical College. From 1856 to 1859, he investigated from the ancient turquois mines of New Mexico to the mineral resources of North Carolina. He established and edited the Mining Magazine (1858–1860). Learning of the creation of a state geological survey for California, he lobbied for the position and hurried to California, only to lose to fellow Yale graduate Josiah Whitney, which began a lifelong enmity between the two geologists. He established a consulting business in San Francisco, travelled to the California gold fields and newly discovered Comstock, and, in 1861, traveled to Japan with another early Arizona geologist, Raphael Pumpelly, to introduce western technology to the shogunate. In 1863, after a side trip to Alaska, Blake returned from Japan to California, took consulting trips including into the new mineral fields of Arizona, and helped organize the first school of mines in the Far West. At what would become University of California, Berkeley, he was appointed professor of mineralogy in the College of California and geologist to the California State Board of Agriculture. The response was less than overwhelming. Clark Spence in his Mining Engineers of the American West quotes State Geologist Whitney's not unexpected critical assessment of Blake's school (p. 44): "W. P. B. is now lecturing at Oakland to the College boys & they call that a Mining School! This is the era of Mining Schools in the U. S.! Heaven save the mark!" Blake's first effort at a mining school ended when the College of California was absorbed by the University of California system.

In 1867 he was appointed as a commissioner representing California at the Exposition Universelle (Paris Exposition). His report on the precious metals, forming one of the government volumes on the Paris exposition of 1867, is full of valuable information. He was the first to recognize the tellurides among the products of California, and was also the first to draw attention to the platinum metals associated with the gold-washings of that state. Some of his findings when reported to Whitney, enmeshed the two in continued feuds over primacy of geologic discoveries. Scientific conflicts between these scientists, especially over priority in recognizing potential oil fields tarnished their reputations. Blake, being less of a self-promoter than Whitney, fared poorly in the conflict. Returning to New York and Connecticut, he was a founding member of the American Institute of Mining Engineers (1871) and contributed to its conferences and "Transactions" throughout his career.

In 1869, he was elected as a member to the American Philosophical Society. In 1871, friends in the East helped with his appointment as chief of the U.S. scientific corps that visited Santo Domingo. Selected by the Smithsonian, during 1872–1876, he collected and installed the government exhibit on the mineral resources of the United States for the Philadelphia Centennial Exposition. As an acting commissioner, he also wrote the article "Glass and Glassware" in the Report of the United States Commissioners to the Paris Universal Exposition, 1878.

While busy with these exhibitions and scientific corps duties, during the 1860s to 1880s, he was also a much sought-after expert witness, testifying in court over the geology of mineral deposits. Among the disputes he was called into were the multiple lode theory on the Comstock, the famed Emma mine scandal in Utah, the Silver King mine and Contention mine disputes in Arizona, over tin mines in the Black Hills of South Dakota, and many others. Clark Spence recounts how his desire for the coveted U. S. Mining Commissioner appointment was lost to Rossiter Raymond because of Blake's opinions given in court against a mine owned by one of Nevada's U.S. Senators. Blake's extensive collection of diaries now at the Arizona Historical Society archives chronicle the work performed in the interest of mining corporations.

One of Blake's greatest failings was the Walnut Grove Dam disaster in Arizona. Blake seems to have been on the project only so that his reputation might attract investors. While he had considerable mining experience, Blake lacked civil engineering or dam building experience. Blake began work in August 1886. He and two of his sons oversaw the digging of a quarry for dam fill, the construction of roads, a sawmill, an office, and quarters for workers. Dillingham Bates, President of the Company overseeing the Dam, visited the Dam in Christmas 1886. Christmas was described as pleasant by all involved, including Blake who noted they'd had a "fatted turkey". But it seems Dillingham was annoyed by a conversation he'd witnessed the day before between Blake and another local prospector. Blake was interested in buying out the prospector's stake, and Dillingham may have felt threatened by Blake's competition. So Dillingham returned on January 15, 1887 and fired Blake. Blake was very bitter, feeling that he had done the most difficult work for very little pay, but acquiesced on January 30. A series of other engineers would oversee the project until its nominal completion in 1888. The dam burst in 1890, killing over a hundred. Blake's inexperience was pointed to as part of the reason for the dam's failure, among a bevy of other issues.

Throughout his career Blake taught whenever he could about his passion, geology. In 1885, he was offered and accepted the presidency of the newly created Dakota School of Mines (now the South Dakota School of Mines, name changed in 1889) in Rapid City, SD. Unfortunately, the territorial legislature reduced the funds for his position, and he declined the move but did send books from his collection to start the school's library. In 1891, the Arizona Territory funded a new university in Tucson and in October 1895 he joined the faculty. From 1895 to 1905 he was professor of geology and director of the School of Mines at the University of Arizona. His students began their careers just at the time of rapid expansion in exploiting Arizona's world class copper deposits. He also served as the territorial geologist and prepared detailed reports on mining for the governor's annual report to the Secretary of Interior, for publication in magazines like the Mining & Scientific Press of San Francisco and the Engineering & Mining Journal of New York City, and in the local press. With his retirement he continued in an active emeritus status at the university until his death; had become recognized and revered for his geologic work and geologic collections, which he donated to institutions across the country; and became a loved Arizona pioneer elected president of the Arizona Pioneers Historical Society (now Arizona Historical Society).

=== Personal life ===
In 1855 he married Charlotte Haven Lord Hayes in Connecticut. Their home was not far from the Blake brothers hardware factory at Mill Rock. His uncle was Eli Whitney Blake, who invented in 1858 the popular Blake rock crusher. His great-uncle was Eli Whitney, inventor of the cotton gin. They retained the home in Connecticut while moving around the West. In 1863 they lost William Phipps Blake, Jr., age 6, in San Francisco, but raised four sons, Francis, Joseph, Danforth and T. Whitney, and daughter Constantia to adulthood. Charlotte Blake died on a visit to Connecticut in 1905.

On May 22, 1910, William Phipps Blake died of exposure and resultant pneumonia in Berkeley, California, four days after, and as a consequence of, receiving an honorary LL.D. degree from the University of California.

== Publications ==
- Description of the fossils and shells collected in California (1855)
- Silver Ores and Silver Mines (1860)
- Report on the Production of Precious Metals (1867)
- Civil Engineering and Public Works (1870)
- Report on iron and steel (1876)
- Ceramic Art and Glass (1878)
- Tombstone and its Mines (1902)
- The published writings of William Phipps Blake (1910)
- The Imperial Valley and the Salton Sink with Harry Thomas Cory (1915)
