= University of Cincinnati College of Engineering and Applied Science =

University in the United States

- Motto: Juncta Juvant (Latin for "Strength in Unity")
- Type: Public (state university)
- Established: 1819
- Affiliations: University of Cincinnati
- Dean: John Walter Weidner
- Students: 4,974 (2025)
- Undergraduates: 4,451 (2025)
- Postgraduates: 523 (2025)
- Location: Cincinnati, Ohio, USA; 39°08′00″N 84°31′00″W
- Campus: Urban
- Website: https://www.ceas.uc.edu

The College of Engineering and Applied Science is the engineering and applied science college of the University of Cincinnati in Cincinnati, Ohio. It is the birthplace of the cooperative education (co-op) program and still holds the largest public mandatory cooperative education program at a public university in the United States. Today, it has a student population of around 4,451 undergraduate and 523 graduate students and is recognized annually as one of the top 100 engineering colleges in the US, ranking 83rd in 2020.

== History ==
=== College of Engineering ===
The creation of the College of Engineering first began with the appointment of a Professor of Civil Engineering in 1874 and the organization of a Department of Engineering at the University of Cincinnati. Established as a college of the university in 1900, the College of Engineering's first dean was Harry Thomas Cory. In 1923 a six-year cooperative program was added in general engineering which led to dual degrees: a bachelor of engineering and a master of science. The college began offering courses in engineering through its own evening division in 1924 and by 1926 grew to include course work in applied arts. In the 1950s the college began to offer graduate instruction in every department. A joint project with the Engineer’s Council for Professional Development and local industry provided opportunities for engineers to pursue graduate degrees without leaving their jobs. In 1995, new class and research space was created with the opening of the Engineering Research Center, which was designed by architect and UC alum Michael Graves.

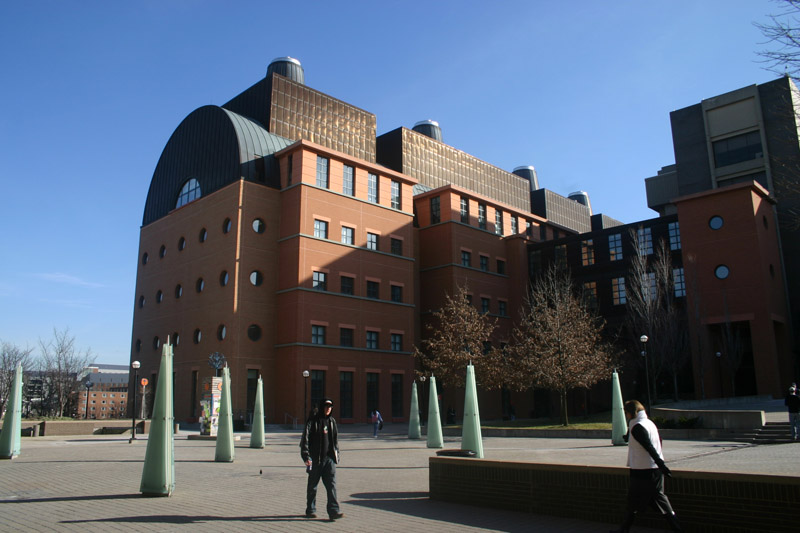
The Engineering Research Center, the third building in the engineering complex.

=== College of Applied Science ===
The College of Applied Science was an applied science college at the University of Cincinnati in Cincinnati, Ohio. Organized as the Ohio Mechanics Institute (OMI) in 1828, it merged with UC in 1969 and was renamed the OMI College of Applied Science in 1978. Formally the school was referred to as the College of Applied Science, CAS offered programs in the engineering technologies and related areas.

== The first cooperative education (co-op) program ==
By 1906, Dean Herman Schneider established the first cooperative education (co-op) program in the United States. The program was established to support Theory with Practice, the belief being that engineers who graduated with both classroom instruction and practical training would be better prepared and have a better foundation to be successful in the practice of engineering. The college allows students to choose either an industry or a research track co-op. The program continues to be the largest mandatory cooperative education program at a public university in the United States and is annually ranked as one of the top 5 programs in the country. Additionally, this program has proven so successful in preparing graduates for their careers that more than 1,000 schools offer forms of it today.

== Programs ==
The College offers programs spread across seven departments. Except for the Department of Engineering Education which focuses on the Freshman curriculum, all Departments offer PhD programs, Masters of Science, Masters of Engineering, and Bachelors Programs.

=== Aerospace Engineering ===
- Aerospace Engineering
- Engineering Mechanics
- Fire Science

=== Biomedical Engineering ===
- Biomedical Engineering

=== Chemical Engineering and Environmental Engineering ===
- Chemical Engineering
- Environmental Engineering
- Environmental Science

=== Civil and Architectural Engineering and Construction Management ===
- Architectural Engineering
- Civil Engineering
- Construction Management

=== Electrical Engineering and Computer Science ===
- Computer Engineering
- Computer Science
- Electrical Engineering
- Electrical Engineering Technology
- Engineering Education
- Cybersecurity Engineering

=== Engineering Education ===
- Freshman Engineering Programs
- Research in Teaching and Learning
- Course Development
- Learning Center

=== Mechanical & Materials Engineering ===
- Mechanical Engineering
- Mechanical Engineering Technology
- Materials Engineering

=== ACCEND Program ===
The College of engineering and Applied Science also offers an ACCelerated ENgineering Degree program where students can graduate in 5 years with a bachelor's and master's degree. Students work with their academic adviser during their first year to determine if this program is suitable for them. Several of the programs offer MBA degrees in conjunction with the Lindner College of Business. the program options are listed below:

Aerospace with Aerospace master's, Aerospace with MBA, Chemical with Chemical master's, Chemical with MBA, Chemical with Materials master's, Civil with MBA, Civil with Environmental master's, Energy & Materials with MBA, Mechanical with MBA, Electrical with Computer Eng master's, Electrical with Electrical master's, Mechanical with Mechanical master's

== Research Centers & Institutes ==
- Aerosol and Air Quality Research Lab
- Advanced Materials Characterization Center
- Center of Academic Excellence in Cyber Operations
- Center for Global Design & Manufacturing
- Center for Hardware and Embedded Systems Security and Trust (CHEST)
- Center for Medical Device Innovation & Entrepreneurship (MDIEP)
- Center for Mobile and Distributed Computing
- Center for Intelligent Propulsion and Advanced Life Management of Systems (CIPALMS)
- Center for Robotics Research
- Center for Surgical Innovation
- Cleanroom
- Collaboratory for Medical Innovation and Implementation
- Digital Design Environments Laboratory (DDEL)
- Environmental Analysis Service Center
- National Science Foundation Industry University Cooperative Research for Intelligent Maintenance Systems (IMS)
- National Science Foundation (NSF) Engineering Research Center for Revolutionizing Metallic Biomaterials
- Next Mobility Lab
- Ohio Center for Microfluidic Innovation
- Radiological Assessment & Measurement Lab
- Siemens Simulation Technology Center
- Sustainable Solutions Laboratory
- UC Simulation Center

=== Research Labs ===
==== Aerospace Engineering and Engineering Mechanics ====
- Autonomous Systems for S.P.A.C.E. R.O.B.O.T.I.C.S.
- Combustion Research Laboratory
- Computational Lab for Materials and Manufacturing Design
- Flight Simulation Lab
- Fluid/Thermal Application Lab
- Gas Dynamics and Propulsion Lab
- Gas Turbine Simulation Laboratory
- GR Lab/Computation for Sustainability
- High Temperature Gas Turbine Erosion Lab
- Multiphase Flow and Combustion Lab
- Nondestructive Evaluation Laboratory
- Space Systems Lab
- Turbomachinery Erosion and Performance Deterioration Laboratory
- UAV Master Lab
- Ultrasonic Imaging

==== Biomedical Engineering ====
- Biomedical Acoustics Lab
- Noyes Tissue Engineering and Biomechanics Laboratories
- Ultrasound Research Laboratory
- Vascular Tissue and Cellular Engineering Lab
- Vontz Core Imaging Lab

==== Chemical and Environmental Engineering ====
- Advanced Biomolecular Engineering Lab
- Aerosol and Air Quality Research Lab
- Atomic Materials for Catalysis Laboratory
- Biomedical Colloid and Interface Lab
- Energy, Environmental, and Nanomedicine Lab
- Environmental Analysis Service Center
- Multi-Scale Environmental Modeling Lab
- Nanoscale Structure and Dynamics Lab
- NANOWORLD Laboratories
- Smart Water System Laboratory
- Sustainable Solutions Laboratory
- Tissue Engineering Lab

==== Civil and Architectural Engineering and Construction Management ====
- Advanced Research in Transportation Engineering Systems Laboratory
- Building Energy Assessment, Solutions and Technology Lab
- Building Innovation
- Construction Materials Lab
- Data-based Optimization, Visualization, and Evaluation of Transportation through Analysis and Integration Lab
- High Bay Structural Lab
- Large Scale Testing Facility
- Next Mobility Lab
- Smart and Healthy Buildings
- Soils Lab
- Structural Bolts & Connections Lab

==== Electrical Engineering and Computer Science ====
- Autonomous Integrated Microsystems (AIM) Laboratory
- Center for Advanced Design and Manufacturing of Integrated Microfluidics
- Center for Hardware and Embedded Systems Security and Trust (CHEST)
- Complex Adaptive Systems Laboratory
- Digital Design Environments Laboratory
- GaAs devices and Integrated Circuits Lab
- High Performance Computing Laboratory
- Infrastructure Institute
- Integrative Biosensing Laboratory
- Machine Learning and Computational Intelligence
- Microsystems and BioMEMS Laboratory
- Microwave Communications Laboratory
- MIND Laboratory
- Multimedia Networking & Computing Lab
- Nanoelectronics Laboratory
- Novel Device Laboratory
- Semiconductor Devices Laboratory
- Software Engineering Research Laboratory
- Solid State Physics & Electronic Materials Laboratory
- Spatio-Temporal Data Analytics Lab
- Spintronics and Vacuum Nanoelectronics Laboratory
- Synergistic Human-Robot Interaction Lab
- Wireless Communications & Signal Processing Lab
- Wireless and Mobile Communication Lab

==== Mechanical and Materials Engineering ====
- Applied Acoustics and Mechanics Lab
- Center for Global Design & Manufacturing
- Center for Laser Shock Processing for Advanced Materials and Devices
- Center for Robotics Research
- Collaboratory for Medical Innovation and Implementation
- Cooperative Distributed Systems Lab
- Digital Fabrication Lab
- Energy Conversion Materials Laboratory
- Energy Materials & Nano-Biomedicine Laboratory
- Innovative Computer Modeling of Materials
- Integrated Vehicle Design Laboratory
- Intelligent CAM Systems Laboratory
- Micro and Nano Manufacturing Laboratory
- National Science Foundation (NSF) Engineering Research Center for Revolutionizing Metallic Biomaterials
- National Science Foundation Industry University Cooperative Research for Intelligent Maintenance Systems (IMS)
- NANOWORLD Laboratories
- Nuclear Forensics Lab
- Center for Occupational Safety and Health Engineering
- Siemens Simulation Technology Center
- Structural Dynamics Research Laboratory
- Structural Health Assessment and Monitoring Lab
- Thermal Fluids & Thermal Processing Laboratory
- Thermoelectric Energy Conversion Laboratory
- Transport in Engineering and Medicine Laboratory
- UC Simulation Center

=== Center Hill Research Center ===
Located at Center Hill Research Center, the Large Scale Test Facility (UCLSTF) is a state-of-art laboratory for testing of large-scale structural projects. The laboratory is served by a 30-ton overhead crane with a 5-ton auxiliary hook, and two 60-gallon per minute pumps. This facility is equipped with computerized controllers capable of controlling an array of sensors to allow testing of large to full-scale structural components and systems. The laboratory has a machine shop for fabrication of specimens, test fixtures, etc. and is equipped to allow testing of full-scale bridge girders and other linear elements up to 100' long, and full-scale buildings up to 2 stories high.

=== P&G Digital Accelerator ===
The P&G Digital Accelerator (formerly called UC Simulation Center) is a collaboration between UC CEAS and Procter & Gamble. Its purpose is to support undergraduate students (coops) and graduate students in doing research for Procter & Gamble. The intent is to not only provide short-term lower-cost simulation to P&G, but also to provide a source of highly trained experts in simulation, making them desirable for employment by Procter & Gamble. The center is also built around the next generation of students, utilizing virtual collaboration to enable flexibility in the working hours for the students.

== Rankings ==
The College of Engineering and Applied Science is regularly ranked as one of the top engineering schools in the country. In the 2011 U.S. News & World Report rankings, the college was ranked 78th in the U.S.

2007 Faculty Scholarly Productivity Index

- Environmental Engineering, 6th in the U.S.
- Biomedical Sciences, 9th in the U.S.

U.S. News & World Report

- Computer Engineering, 77th in the U.S.
- Computer Science, 112th in the U.S.
- Electrical Engineering, 89th in the U.S.
- Environmental Engineering, 20th in the U.S.
- Aerospace Engineering, 31st in the U.S.
- Industrial Engineering, 37th in the U.S.
- Civil Engineering, 48th in the U.S.
- Materials Engineering, 50th in the U.S.
- Mechanical Engineering, 60th in the U.S.

== Facilities ==
Baldwin Hall was built in 1911 and is the headquarters for administration and academic classrooms. The building reopened in January 2002 after extensive renovations with computing laboratories, electronic classroom, and seminar rooms.

Rhodes Hall was built adjacent to Baldwin Hall to accommodate the expansion that took place in the 1970s. The building provides faculty offices, undergraduate and graduate laboratories, and a 12,000 sq. ft. high bay area. In 2011, the CEAS Alumni Learning Center was constructed in Rhodes Hall, which include labs, research space, and areas for students, professors, and alumni to gather and collaborate.

Mantei Center (formerly Engineering Research Center) Opened in 1995, this facility houses state-of-the-art research laboratories and offices for graduate students and faculty. It is conveniently located adjacent to the existing engineering complex and was designed to look like a 4-cylinder engine. It was recently renamed to honor distinguished professor Thomas Mantei.

Old Chemistry Building Also called Old Chem, used for offices, classrooms, and laboratories. Many engineering departments, and UC colleges, share the space for research, administration, instruction, and program support. In 2025, Old Chem was gutted and renovated to cope with the demands of the 21st century, including a central atrium, refurbished classrooms and study rooms
