= Carl H. Lindner College of Business =

Business school of the University of Cincinnati

Coordinates: 39°08′06″N 84°30′49″W

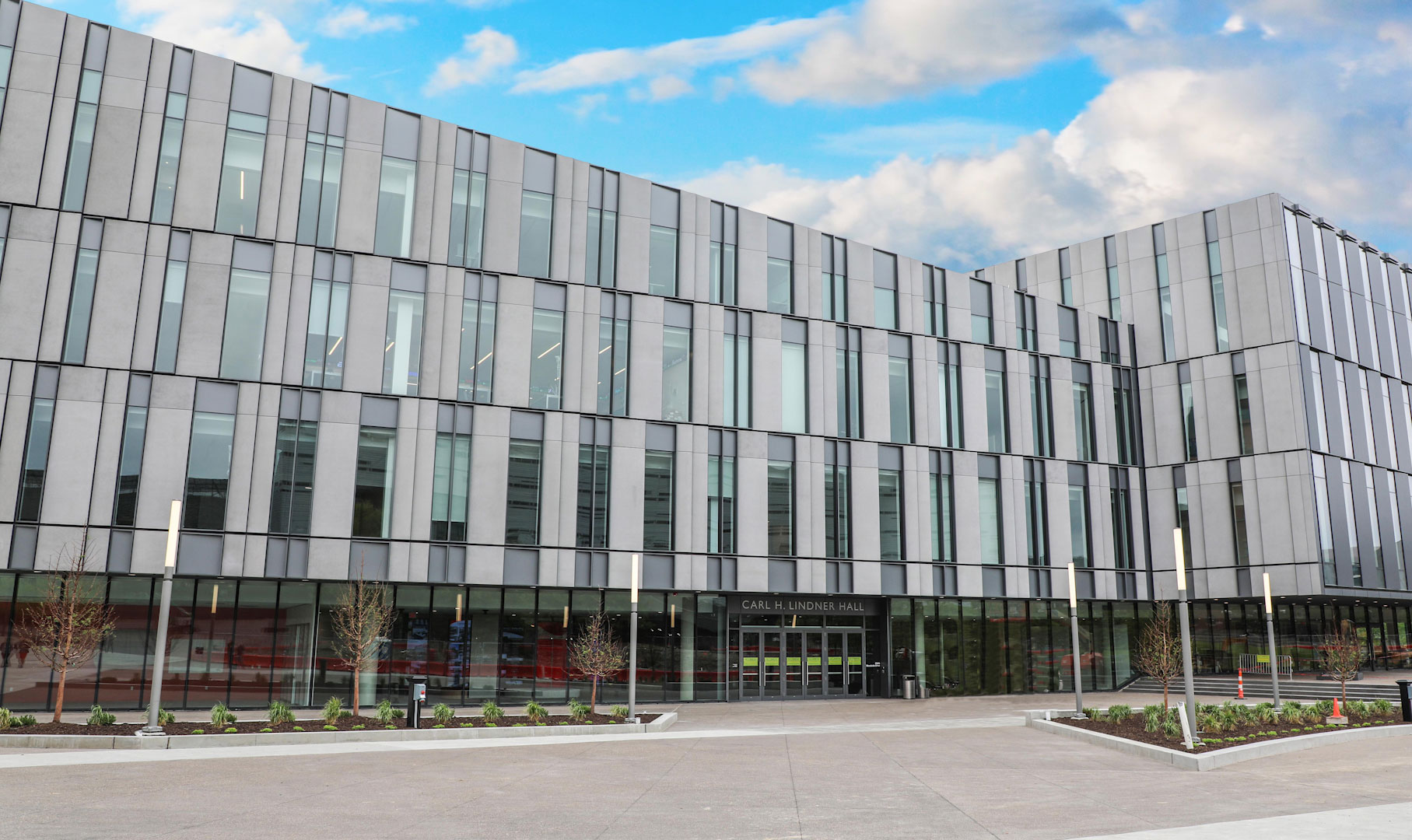
- Carl H. Lindner Hall
- Type: Public (state university)
- Established: 1906
- Affiliations: AACSB
- Dean: Marianne W. Lewis, PhD
- Students: 5,101 (2019)
- Undergraduates: 3,956 (2019)
- Postgraduates: 1,145 (2019)
- Doctoral students: 39 (2019)
- Location: Cincinnati, OH, United States
- Campus: Urban
- Website: https://business.uc.edu

Carl H. Lindner College of Business, also referred to as "Lindner" and "Lindner College," is a college of the University of Cincinnati. The college is located in Carl H. Lindner Hall. On June 21, 2011, the college was named after Carl Henry Lindner, Jr. in honor of the contributions he has made to the university, college, and the business community. The college has three undergraduate degree options, five master's degrees, and a doctoral program spread out over seven departments.

Lindner is ranked as a top undergraduate business school and top 75 graduate business schools in the nation by U.S. News & World Report and has three honors programs, the Carl H. Lindner Honors-PLUS program, the Kolodzik Business Scholars program, and the Circle of Excellence program.

== History ==
Lindner College traces its roots to 1906 when the Cincinnati College of Finance, Commerce and Accounts was established. In 1912, the University of Cincinnati Board of Trustees took over the college. In 1919, the College of Commerce was merged with the College of Engineering to form the College of Engineering Commerce. In 1946, the college resumed operation as a separate entity. Over the years several programs were added, such as a Master of Business Administration (MBA) program, a PhD program in 1966, and a Master of Science (MS) program in 1978.

In April 2017, construction went underway to create a new, modern building for Lindner College. The building is four stories tall (plus a basement) and totals around 225,000 square feet. The building also has two courtyards, which total 6,230 square feet. Some specialty features of the new building include the Kautz Attic, a space designated and designed to promote entrepreneurship for students, as well as the Johnson Investment Counsel Investment Lab, featuring a simulated trading floor and 12 Bloomberg computer terminals to be utilized by students. There is also an area for Career Services, featuring twelve interview rooms and a corporate recruitment area, helping Lindner students obtain employment. The building opened for classes in the fall of 2019, with a grand opening celebration held September 19, 2019.

== Academic programs ==
Lindner also collaborates on Master of Health Administration housed in the College of Allied Health Sciences and in conjunction with the College of Medicine.

=== Accounting ===
- Undergraduate: BBA Accounting
- Graduate: MS Accounting, MS Taxation
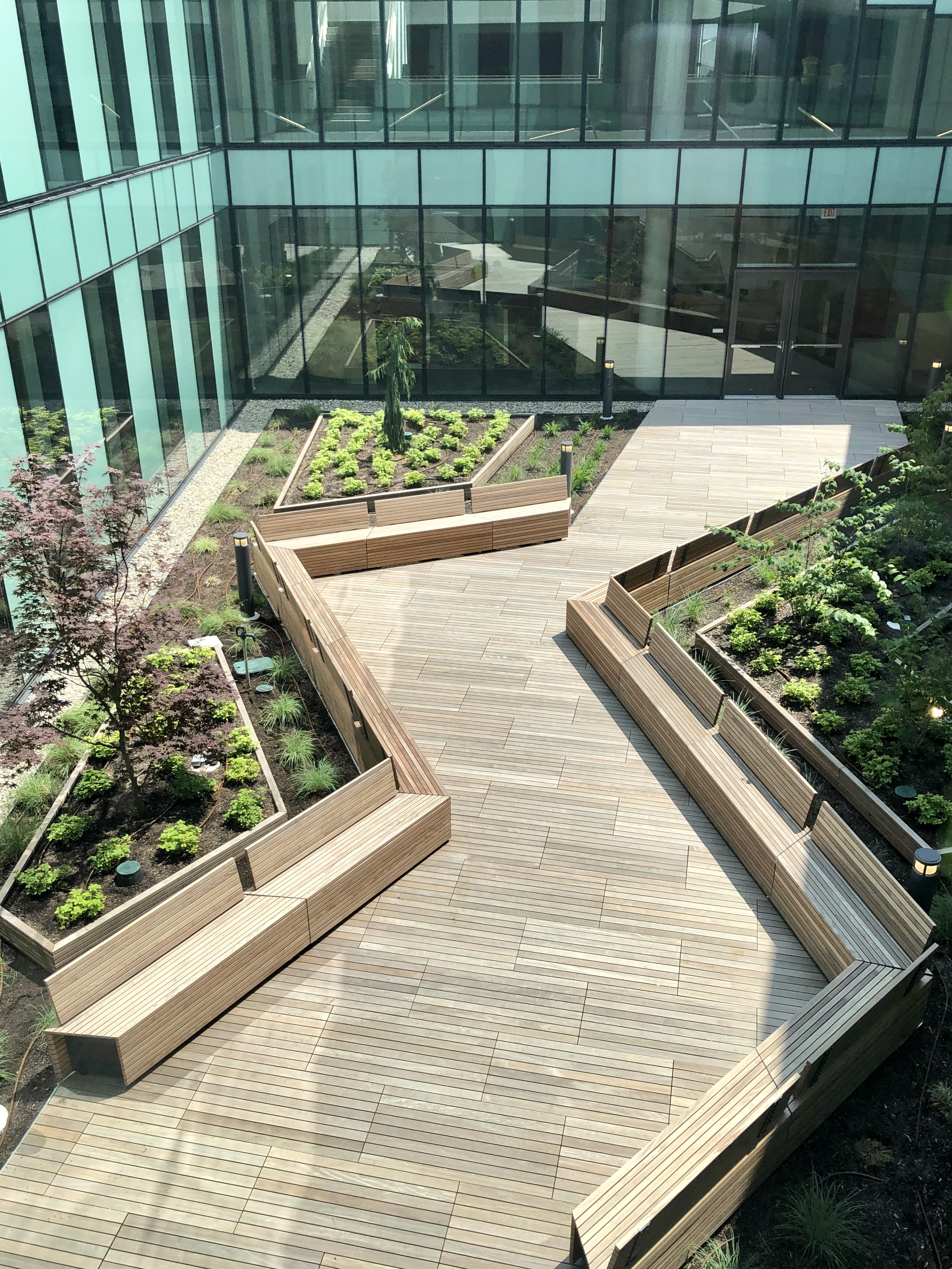
  Lindner Hall courtyard
- PhD: Concentration in Accounting

=== Economics ===
- Undergraduate: BA Economics, BBA Business Economics
- Graduate: MS Applied Economics
- PhD: Concentration in Economics

=== Finance - Real Estate ===
- Undergraduate: BBA Finance, BBA Real Estate
- Graduate: MBA Finance, MBA Commercial Real Estate, MS Finance
- PhD: Concentration in Finance

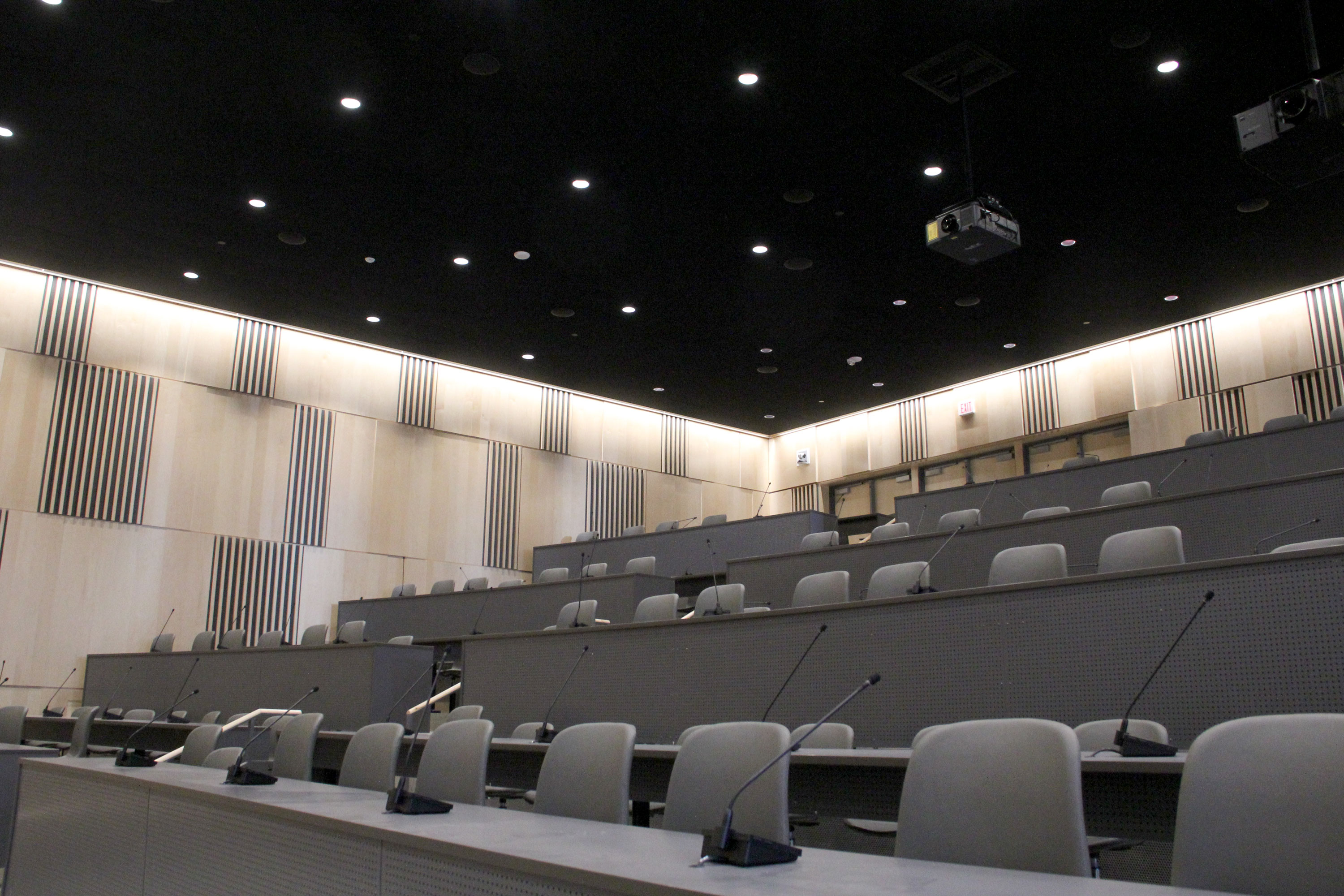
Lindner Hall auditorium

=== Management ===
- Undergraduate: BBA Entrepreneurship, BBA International Business
- Graduate: MBA Management
- PhD: Concentration in Management

=== Marketing ===
- Undergraduate: BBA Marketing
- Graduate: MS Marketing, MBA Marketing, Graduate Certificate in Marketing
- PhD: Concentration in Marketing

=== Operations, Business Analytics, and Information Systems ===
- Undergraduate: BBA Operations Management, BBA Information Systems, BS Industrial Management (a degree offered in conjunction with the College of Engineering and Applied Science)
- Graduate: MS in Business Analytics (previously known as MS Quantitative Analysis), MBA Quantitative Analysis, MBA Operations Management, Certificate in Operations Excellence, PhD in business with Concentration in Operations Management and Quantitative Analysis.
- PhD: Doctor of Philosophy in Business, Concentration in Quantitative Analysis, Concentration Operations Management, and Concentration in Information Systems.

=== Insurance and Risk Management ===
- Undergraduate: BBA Insurance and Risk Management

=== International Business ===
- Undergraduate: BBA International Business

== Centers ==
- Center for Business Analytics
- Center for Entrepreneurship Education & Research
  - Small Business Institute®
- Center for Performance Excellence
- Center for Productivity Improvement
- Economics Center for Education & Research
- Goering Center for Family & Private Business
  - Offers Certificate in Family Business
  - The Business Boards Institute
- Real Estate Center
- Center for Professional Selling

== Student organizations ==
- Accounting Club
- Alpha Kappa Psi Professional Business Fraternity
- Alpha Rho Epsilon Real Estate Club
- American Marketing Association (UC AMA)
- Association of Supply Chain Management (ASCM)
- Bearcat Advertising and Networking Group (BANG)
- Bearcat Ventures
- Beta Alpha Psi Accounting Honorary
- Beta Gamma Sigma Honorary
- Business Analytics Club
- Business Fellows
- CATALYST Marketing
- Center for Entrepreneurship
- Economics Society
- Lindner Ambassadors (Volunteer Recruitment Team)
- Lindner Business Honors Student Advisory Board
- Lindner Graduate Students Association
- Lindner Student Association (Student Government Tribunal)
- Lindner Women in Business (LWiB)
- Delta Sigma Pi Professional Business Fraternity
- Finance Club
- International Business Club (IBC)
- Investment Club
- Masters of Business Administration Association (MBAA)
- National Association of Black Accountants (NABA)
- National Association of Women MBA (NAWMBA)
- Neo Initiative
- Pi Sigma Epsilon Sales & Marketing Fraternity
- Pride at Lindner (PaL)
- Project Management Club
- Sales Leadership Club
- Sport Business Consulting
- UC Hospitality
- UC Real Estate Association
- Queen City Consulting

== Rankings ==
Business school rankings

U.S. MBA Rankings
- Bloomberg (2025): 68

Lindner College houses several ranked programs, including an undergraduate Accounting program that ranks 10th in US and a Real Estate that has been named the 5th most influential in US by the Journal of Real Estate Economics. The Princeton Review and Entrepreneur Magazine have also recognized the entrepreneurship program as one of the top 25 in the nation. U.S. News & World Report 2011:

- One of the 386 'best undergraduate business schools' in 2010
- Top 10 MBA for Highest Financial Value Upon Graduation
- 75th out of the top MBA programs
- 37th out of all public institutions

Princeton Review 2011:

- One of the best 301 business schools

BusinessWeek

- top 100 undergraduate business programs

Bloomberg BusinessWeek 2013

- 36th in the nation among public business schools
- 84th in the nation among all business schools
- No. 5 accounting
- No. 6 quantitative methods
- No. 7 ethics
- No. 10 microeconomics
- No. 10 macroeconomics
- No. 14 international business
- No. 15 operations management
- No. 16 finance
- No. 37 information systems
- No. 40 sustainability
- No. 41 entrepreneurship
- No. 45 corporate strategy
- No. 55 business law

== See also ==
- List of business schools in the United States
- List of United States graduate business school rankings
