= University of Cincinnati College of Arts and Sciences =

- Motto: Juncta Juvant ("Strength in Unity")
- Type: Public (state university)
- Established: 1819
- Dean: James Mack
- Location: Cincinnati, Ohio, USA
- Campus: Urban
- Website: http://www.artsci.uc.edu

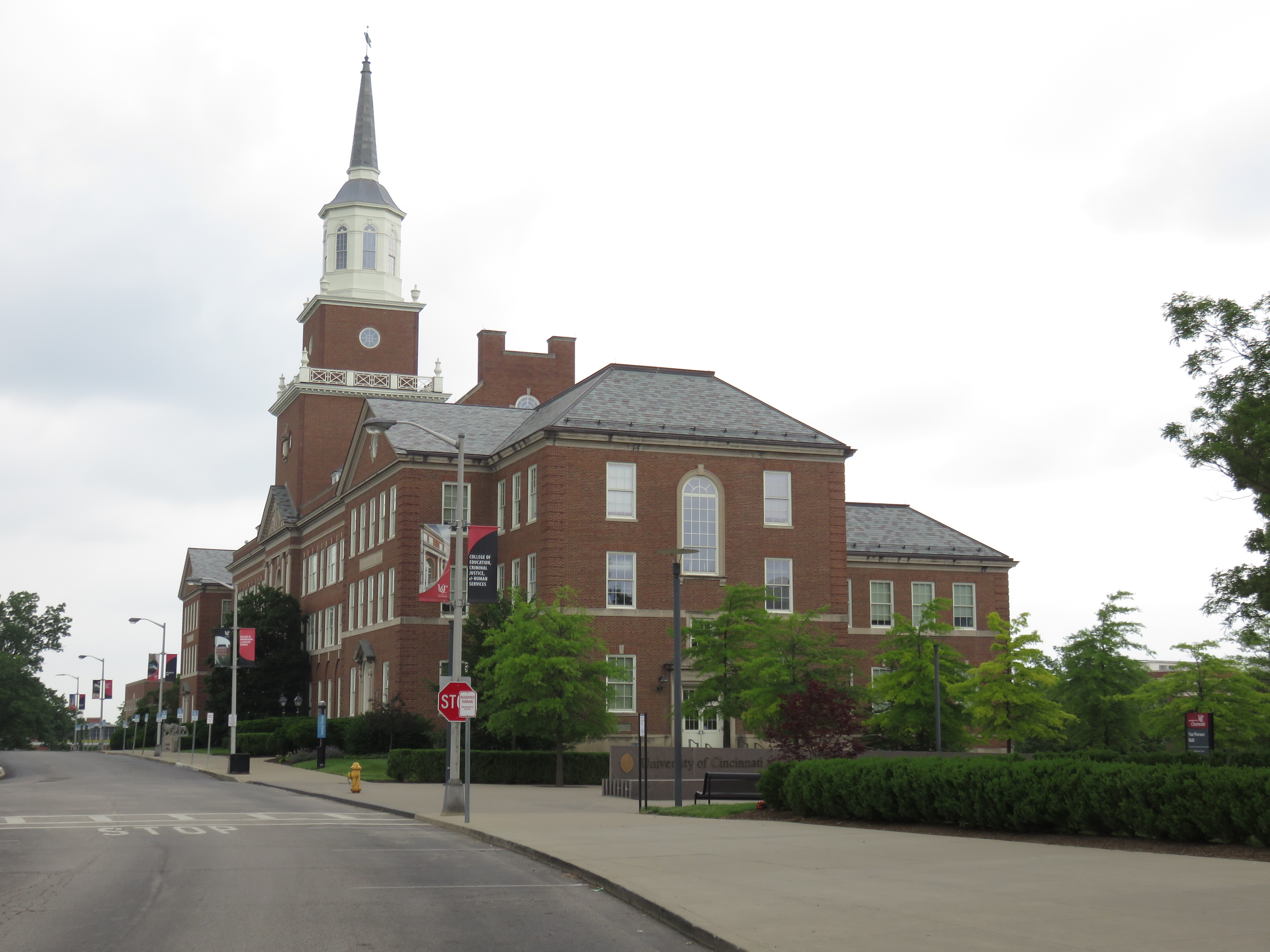
Arts & Sciences Hall (formerly McMicken Hall) on the main campus

The College of Arts and Sciences, is a liberal arts college of the University of Cincinnati. Located in the university's main campus in Cincinnati, Ohio, the college is commonly referred to as Arts and Sciences or simply A&S. As the largest and most diverse college, A&S is the academic heart of the University of Cincinnati and home to twenty-one departments, eight co-op programs, several interdisciplinary programs, and 407 full-time faculty members.

== Name ==
The college was formally named after Charles McMicken because his donation of land helped found the university. In December 2019, the university's board of trustees voted to remove McMicken's name from the college because he had been a slaveowner. The name was removed from the rest of campus in June, 2022.

== Programs ==
The college offers 55 undergraduate majors, 22 masters programs, and 14 doctoral programs. Enrollment comprises over 6,000 undergraduate students and over 800 graduate students. The college also offers a number of "4+1" programs where students complete their bachelor's and master's degree continuously in 5 years.

=== Undergraduate ===
- Africana Studies
- Anthropology
- Archaeology
  - Archaeology of Social Complexity
  - Landscape Archaeology
  - Geoarchaeology
- Asian Studies
- Biochemistry (BA)
- Biochemistry (BS)
- Biological Sciences (BA)
- Biological Sciences (BS)
  - Animals (Zoology)
  - Biomedical Studies
  - Cell & Molecular
  - Ecology & Evolution
- Chemistry (BS-ACS)
- Chemistry (BS)
- Classical Civilization
- Classics; the Classics Department is one of the most active
  centers for the study of Bronze Age and Classical antiquity in
  the United States (including research and field work in archaeology,
  ancient history, and Classical philology). The department also includes
  the US offices of L'Année philologique, the comprehensive bibliographic
  database for Classical philology.
- Communication; School of Communication, Film, and Media Studies
- Digital Media Collaborative
- Film and Media Studies
- English
  - Creative Writing
  - Fiction
  - Poetry
  - Literary & Cultural Studies
  - Rhetoric & Professional Writing
- Environmental Studies
- Exploratory Studies (undecided)
- French
- Geography (BA)
  - Environmental
  - Human
  - Urban Economic
- Geography (BS)
  - Environmental
  - GIS
  - Remote Sensing
- Geology (BA)
- Geology (BS)
- German Studies

- History
  - Globalization & Transregional Connections
  - Law, History, & Society
  - Race, Ethnicity, & Inequality
  - Religion & Culture
  - Technology, Science, & Medicine
- Interdisciplinary Studies
  - 1. Individualized/Specialized
- International Affairs
- Journalism
- Judaic Studies
  - Hebrew Language
  - Service/Experiential Learning
- Liberal Arts
- Mathematical Sciences
  - Actuarial Sciences
  - Statistics
- Neuroscience
  - Brain/Mind/Behavior
  - Neurobiology
  - Neuropsychology
- Organizational Leadership
  - Human Resources
- Philosophy
  - Biohumanities
  - Law & Ethics
- Physics (BA)
- Physics (BS)
  - Astrophysics
- School of Public and International Affairs (SPIA)
  - Political Science
  - Law and Society
  - International Relations
- Pre-Professional Programs
  - 1. Pre-Dentistry
  - 2. Pre-Law
  - 3. Pre-Medicine
  - 4. Pre-Optometry
  - 5. Pre-Veterinary Medicine
- Psychology (BA)
- Psychology (BS)
- Sociology
- Spanish
- Statistics
- Women's, Gender, & Sexuality Studies
  - North Amer. Women's Studies
  - Sexuality Studies

=== Graduate ===
Master's

- Anthropology
- Biological Sciences
- Chemistry
- Classics
- Communication
- English
- French
- Geography
- Geology
- German Studies
- History
- Human Resources
- Mathematical Sciences
- Pedagogy in French or Spanish
- Philosophy
- Physics
- Political Science (MA, MA/JD, PhD, JD/PhD)
- Sociology
- Spanish
- Statistics
- Teaching Math
- Women's, Gender, and Sexuality Studies (MA, MA/JD)

Doctoral

- Biological Sciences
- Chemistry
- Classics
- Communication
- English
- Geography
- Geology
- German Studies
- History
- Mathematical Sciences
- Philosophy
- Physics
- Psychology
- Romance Languages
- Sociology

== Centers & Institutes ==
- Center for Biosensors & Chemical Sensors
- Center for Geospatial Information & Environmental Sensor Network (GIESN)
- Center for Organizational Leadership
- Charles Phelps Taft Research Center
- University of Cincinnati Center for Field Studies
- Cognition, Action and Perception Center (CAP)
- Kunz Center for Social Research
- Portman Center for Policy Solutions
