= Harry Thomas Cory =

American engineer and professor

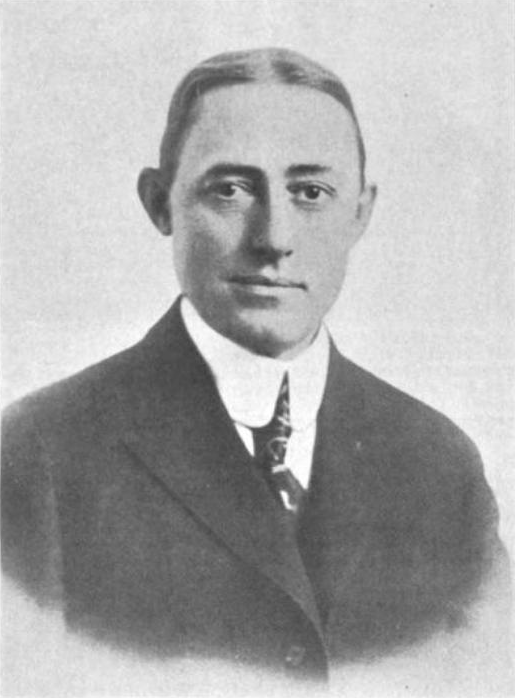
- Born: May 27, 1870; Montmorenci, Indiana
- Died: March 22, 1955 (aged 84)
- Education: Purdue University; Cornell University
- Occupations: Engineer, professor
- Spouse: Ida Judd Hiller (m. 1911)
- Children: 3

Signature
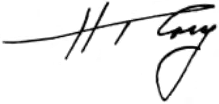

Harry Thomas Cory (May 27, 1870 – March 22, 1955) was an American engineer and professor.

== Biography ==
Harry Thomas Cory was born in Montmorenci, Indiana, the son of Thomas and Carrie (Stoney) Cory.

Cory received his bachelor's degree in mechanical engineering from Purdue University in 1889 and advanced degrees in 1893 and 1896 from Cornell University. He married Ida Judd Hiller on October 4, 1911, and they had three children.

He was a professor of civil engineering at the University of Missouri from 1893 to 1898 and a professor of sanitary engineering from 1898 to 1900. He was the dean of the College of Engineering at the University of Cincinnati from 1900 to 1902.

From 1902 to 1911 he held several positions with railway firms including assistant to the general manager for the Southern Pacific Company from 1904 to 1905 and assistant to the president of Harriman Lines, Arizona and Mexico from 1905 to 1911. He was also the general manager and chief engineer, California Development Company and La Sociedad de Riego Terrenos de la Baja California, S.A., where he worked on irrigation systems for the Imperial Valley and was in charge of re-diversion of the Colorado River from the Salton Sea, 1906–07.

Cory was a member of the American Society of Civil Engineers, the American Society of Mechanical Engineers, the Bohemian Club (San Francisco), the Faculty Club (Berkeley, California). He was also an American member of the Nile Commission.

He lived in Los Angeles for the last ten years of his life, dying on March 22, 1955.

== Publications ==
- The Thompson-Houston system of electric lighting .. (1887)
- Multiphase alternating current transmission .. (1896)
- Report on the financial condition of the California development company and its subsidiary company, La Sociedad de riego y terrenos de la Baja California, S.A. (1906)
- The Imperial Valley and the Salton Sink with William Phipps Blake (1915)
- Opportunities in the South; address delivered before the Southern Land Congress, November 12, 1918 (1918)
