= University of Cincinnati College of Applied Science =

Former applied sciences college

Coordinates: 39.1217°N 84.4844°W

- Motto: Juncta Juvant ("Strength in Unity")
- Type: Public (state university)
- Established: 1828; 198 years ago
- Location: Cincinnati, Ohio, USA
- Campus: Urban
- Website: www.uc.edu/cas/ at the Wayback Machine (archived April 7, 2009)

The University of Cincinnati College of Applied Science (CAS) was an applied science college at the University of Cincinnati in Cincinnati, Ohio. Organized as the Ohio Mechanics Institute (OMI) in 1828, it merged with UC in 1969 and was renamed the OMI College of Applied Science in 1978. On September 22, 2009, CAS merged with the College of Engineering to create the College of Engineering and Applied Science.
