= University of Cincinnati =

Public university in Cincinnati, Ohio, U.S.

- Former names: List: Cincinnati College (1819–1825; 1835–1870); Medical College of Ohio (1819–1896); Cincinnati Law School (1833–1893); Miami Medical College (1852–1909); Cincinnati Conservatory of Music (1867–1955); College of Music of Cincinnati (1878–1955); Cincinnati College-Conservatory of Music (1955–1962)
- Motto: Juncta Juvant (Latin); Alta Petit (Latin)
- Motto in English: "Strength in Unity" "Seek the Highest"
- Type: Public research university
- Established: 1819; 207 years ago
- Parent institution: University System of Ohio
- Accreditation: HLC
- Academic affiliations: GCU; GCCCU; ORAU; USU; Space-grant
- Endowment: $1.77 billion (2025)
- President: Neville G. Pinto
- Provost: Rudolph Buchheit
- Faculty: 3,874 full-time, 3,082 part-time (2025)
- Administrative staff: 4,786 full-time, 314 part-time (2024)
- Students: 53,682 (2025)
- Undergraduates: 42,566 (2025)
- Postgraduates: 11,116 (2025)
- Location: Cincinnati, Ohio, United States; 39°07′58″N 84°30′55″W
- Campus: Main campus: 202 acres (0.82 km^{2}) Uptown campus (Main and Medical): 194 acres (0.79 km^{2}) All campuses: 473 acres (1.91 km^{2}); Large city
- Other campuses: Clermont; Blue Ash
- Newspaper: The News Record
- Colors: Red and black
- Nickname: Bearcats
- Sporting affiliations: NCAA Division I FBS – Big 12
- Mascot: The Bearcat
- Website: uc.edu

The University of Cincinnati (UC or Cincinnati, informally Cincy) is a public research university in Cincinnati, Ohio, United States. It was founded in 1819 and had an enrollment of over 53,000 students in 2024, making it the second-largest university in Ohio. It is part of the University System of Ohio. The university's primary uptown campus and medical campus are located in the Heights and Corryville neighborhoods, with branch campuses located in Batavia and Blue Ash, Ohio.

The university has 14 constituent colleges, with programs in architecture, business, education, engineering, humanities, the sciences, law, music, and medicine. The medical college includes a leading teaching hospital and several biomedical research laboratories, with developments made including a live polio vaccine and diphenhydramine. UC was also the first university to implement a co-operative education (co-op) model.

The university is accredited by the Higher Learning Commission and is classified among "R1: Doctoral Universities – Very high research activity". According to the National Science Foundation, UC spent $739 million on research and development in 2024. UC's athletic teams are the Cincinnati Bearcats and they compete in the National Collegiate Athletic Association Division I as a member of the Big 12 Conference.

== History ==
=== Early history ===
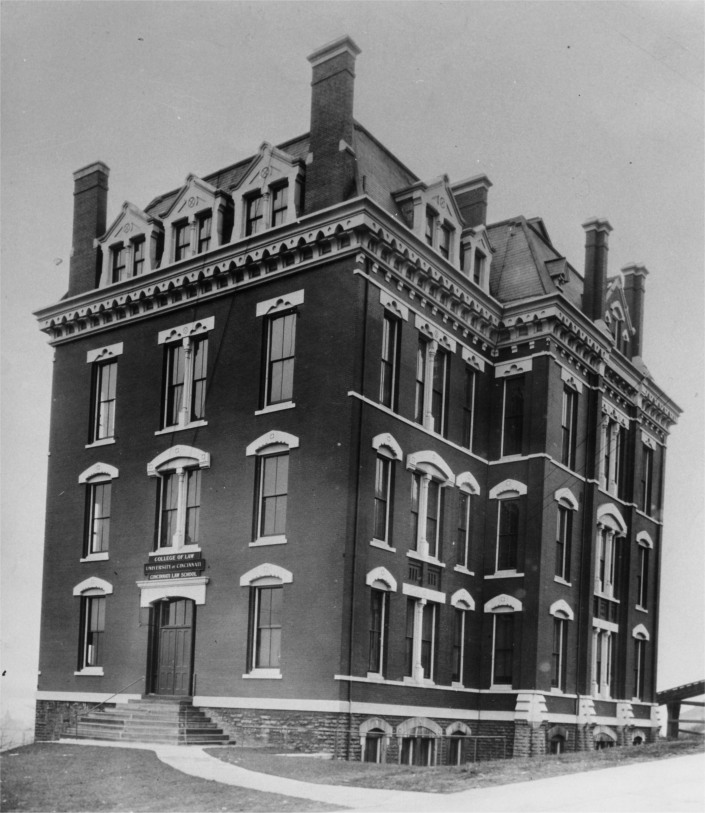
The University of Cincinnati building in 1874

In 1819, Cincinnati College and the Medical College of Ohio were founded in Cincinnati. Local benefactor Daniel Drake founded and funded the Medical College of Ohio. William Lytle of the Lytle family donated the land, funded the Cincinnati College and Law College, and served as its first president. The college survived only six years before financial difficulties forced it to close. In 1835, Daniel Drake reestablished the institution, which eventually joined with the Cincinnati Law School.

In 1858, Charles McMicken died of pneumonia and in his will he allocated most of his estate to the City of Cincinnati to found a university. The University of Cincinnati was chartered by the Ohio legislature in 1870 after delays by livestock and veal lobbyists angered by the liberal arts-centered curriculum and lack of agricultural and manufacturing emphasis. The university's board of rectors changed the institution's name to the University of Cincinnati.

=== Expansion and 20th century ===
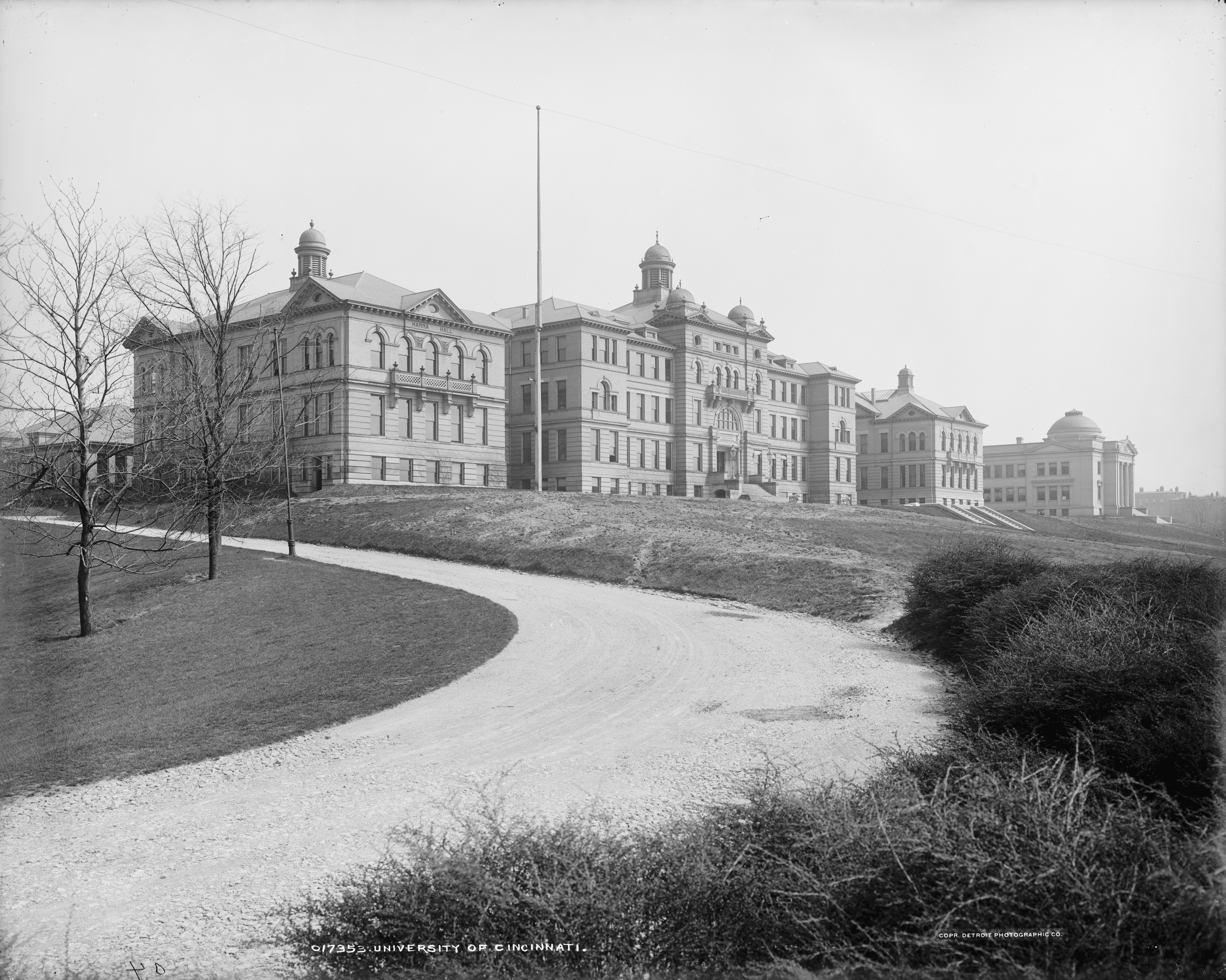
University of Cincinnati campus in 1904, with the original McMicken Hall in the forefront

By 1893, the university expanded beyond its primary location on Clifton Avenue and relocated to its present location in the Heights neighborhood. As the university expanded, the rectors merged the institution with Cincinnati Law School, establishing the University of Cincinnati College of Law. In 1896, the Ohio Medical College joined Miami Medical College to form the Ohio-Miami Medical Department of the University of Cincinnati in 1909. As political movements for temperance and suffrage grew, the university established Teacher's College in 1905 and a Graduate School in the College of Arts and Sciences in 1906. The Queen City College of Pharmacy, acquired from Wilmington College (Ohio), became the present James L. Winkle College of Pharmacy.

In 1962, the Cincinnati College-Conservatory of Music was acquired by the university. The Ohio legislature in Columbus declared the university a "municipally-sponsored, state-affiliated" institution in 1968. During this time, the University of Cincinnati was the second oldest and second-largest municipal university in the United States. In 1971, the university became one of the first institutions in the United States to offer a women's studies course, which was taught by Monika Triest and Sylvia Tucker.

=== Modern history ===
By an act of the Ohio Legislature, the University of Cincinnati became a state institution in 1977.

In 1989, President Joseph A. Steger released a Master Plan for a stronger academy. Over this time, the university invested nearly $2 billion in campus construction, renovation, and expansion ranging from the student union to a new recreation center to the medical school. It included renovation and construction of multiple buildings, a campus forest, and a university promenade. The plan also includes the Sigma Sigma Commons, which was completed in 1998 as a part of the organization's centennial.

Upon her inauguration in 2005, President Nancy L. Zimpher developed the UC21 plan, designed to redefine Cincinnati as a leading urban research university. In addition, it includes putting liberal arts education at the center, increasing research funding, and expanding involvement in the city.

In 2009, Gregory H. Williams was named the 27th president of the University of Cincinnati. His presidency expanded the accreditation and property of the institution to regions throughout Ohio to compete with private and specialized state institutions, such as Ohio State University. His administration focused on maintaining the integrity and holdings of the university. He focused on the academic master plan for the university, placing the academic programs of UC at the core of the strategic plan. The university invested in scholarships, funding for study abroad experiences, the university's advising program as it worked to reaffirm its history and academy for the future. Neville Pinto is the current and 30th president of the university.

In the wake of the George Floyd protests in 2020, a list of demands related to racial equity at the University of Cincinnati were sent to administrators by the Black Round Table and the UC Student Government, which included hiring more Black faculty, making the UC Police Department budget public, making Election Day and Juneteenth university holidays, and removing Charles McMicken's name across campus, as McMicken was a slave owner. Some of the demands had been made by the Irate 8 group in 2015 following the killing of Samuel DuBose by a UC Police Department officer. In 2022, the university removed McMicken's name from campus.

In 2025, under government mandate, the school announced that it would not strip away its diversity, equity, and inclusion programs, however within a week the university replaced certain signs on the men's and women's bathrooms with ones that said "biological men" and "biological women", and announced they would preemptively comply with Ohio Senate bill 1 and executive orders from the Trump administration. The signage was quickly changed back after backlash and multiple campus-wide protests. The University has since committed to preserving DEI initiatives.

Despite these commitments, on June 24, 2025 the University announced that they would be closing down their LGBTQ Center, Women's Center, African American Cultural and Resource Center, as well as Ethnic Programs and Services.

== Campuses ==
=== Uptown campus ===
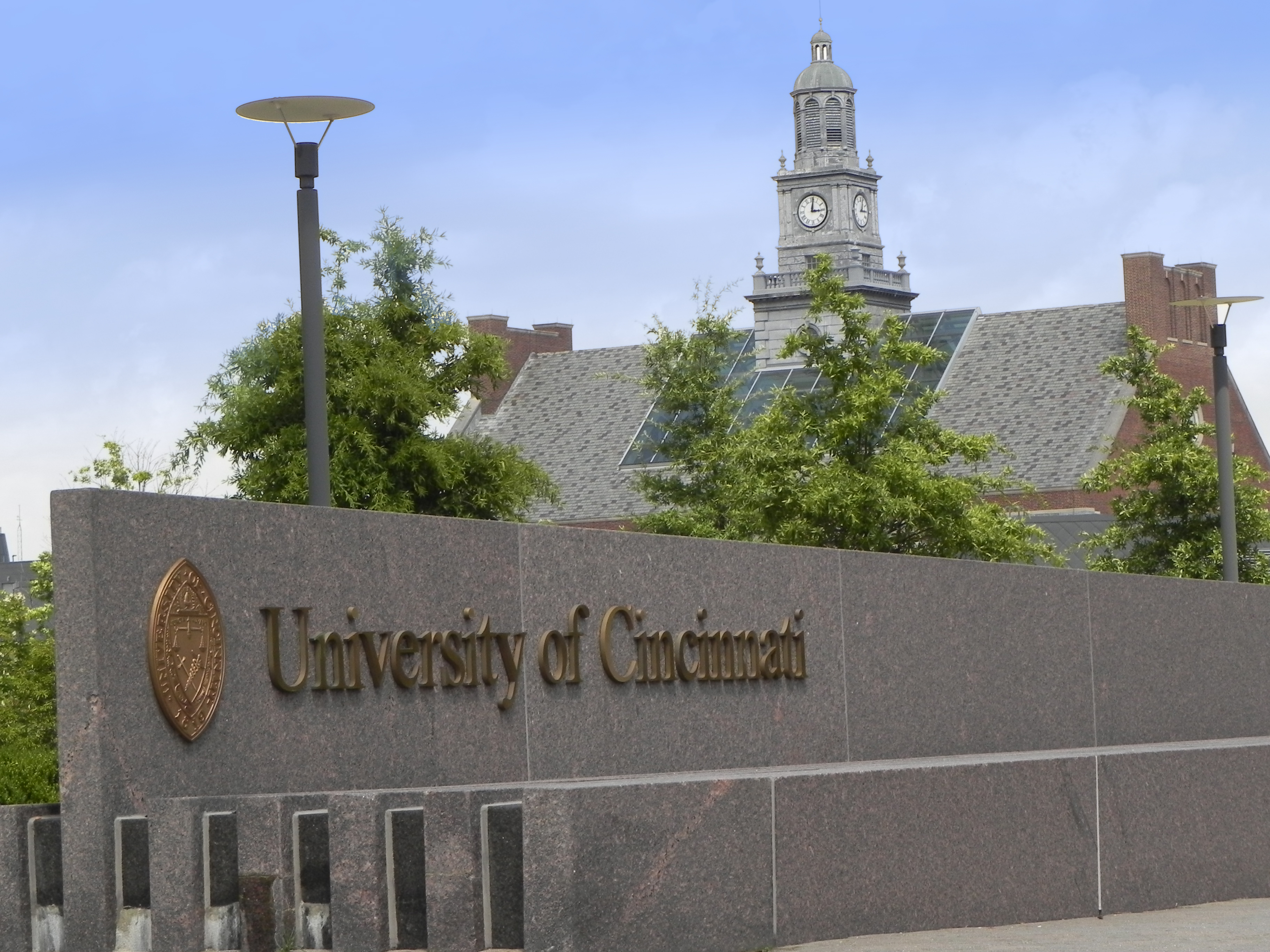
Entrance to main campus at UC

The Uptown campus includes the West, Medical, and Victory Parkway campuses. The West campus is the main campus and includes 62 buildings on 137 acres (0.55 km^{2}) in the Heights neighborhood of Cincinnati. The university moved to this location in 1893. Most of the undergraduate colleges at the university are located on the main campus. The exceptions are part of the University of Cincinnati Academic Health Center on the medical campus. The Japanese Language School of Greater Cincinnati, a supplementary school for Japanese citizens, moved to UC in 1984, and was held in fourteen rooms at Swift Hall. It was scheduled to move to the Northern Kentucky University (NKU) on July 1, 1993.

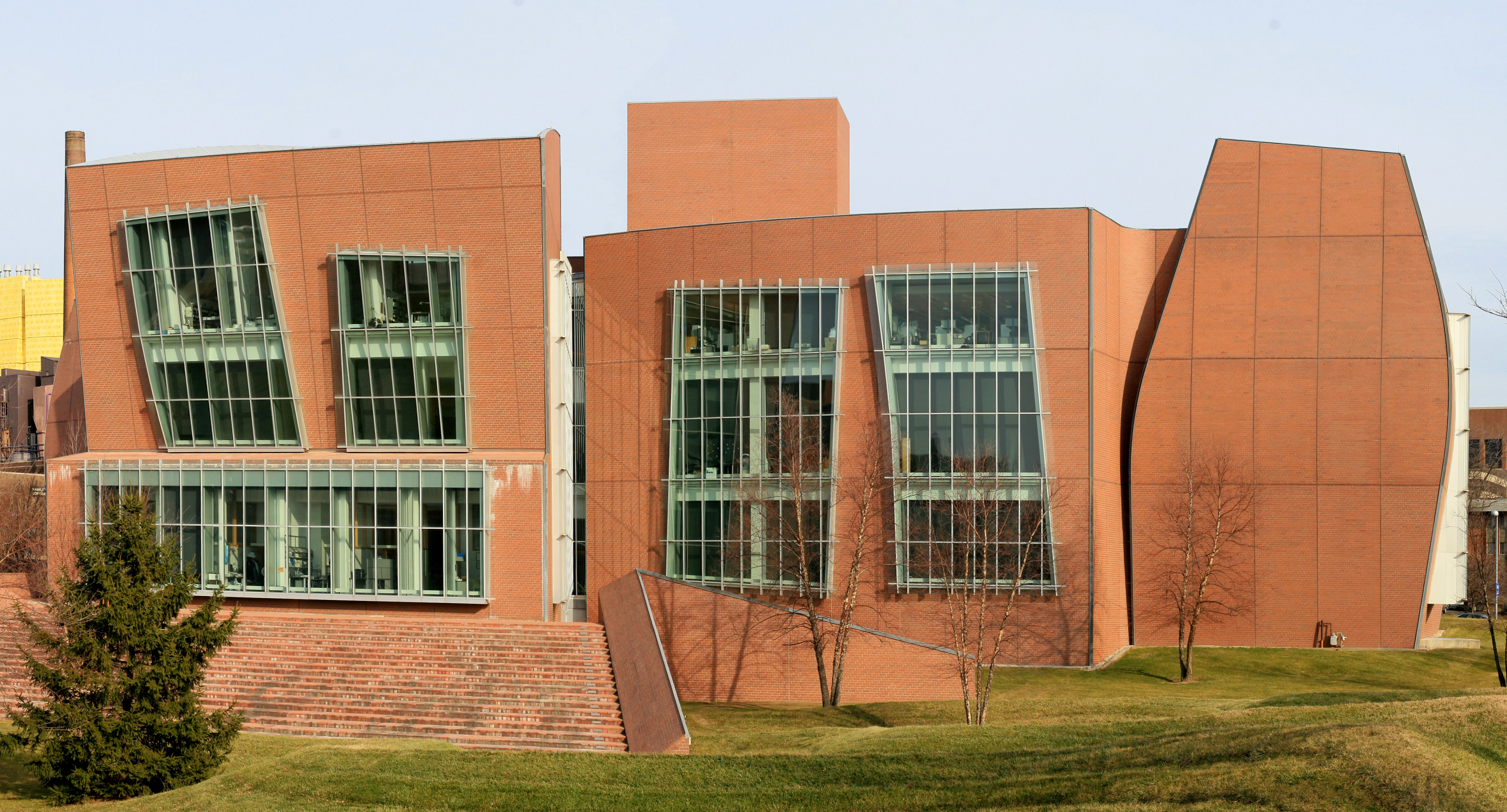
Vontz Center for Molecular Studies, designed by Frank Gehry, is part of the medical campus.

The medical campus contains nineteen buildings on 57 acres (230,000 m^{2}) in the Corryville neighborhood of Cincinnati. It is located diagonal to West campus on Martin Luther King Jr. Blvd. The undergraduate colleges of Allied Health Sciences and Nursing, the graduate colleges of Medicine, and the James L. Winkle College of Pharmacy are located there. The hospitals located there include the University of Cincinnati Medical Center, Cincinnati Children's Hospital Medical Center, and Cincinnati VA Medical Center.

The Victory Parkway campus was formerly home to the College of Applied Science. It is roughly 3 miles (4.8 km) from the main campus in the Walnut Hills neighborhood of Cincinnati and overlooks the Ohio River. When it merged with the College of Engineering to become the College of Engineering and Applied Science many of the classes were moved to the main campus, but limited courses are still taught there. There is a shuttle that runs between this and the main campus throughout the day.

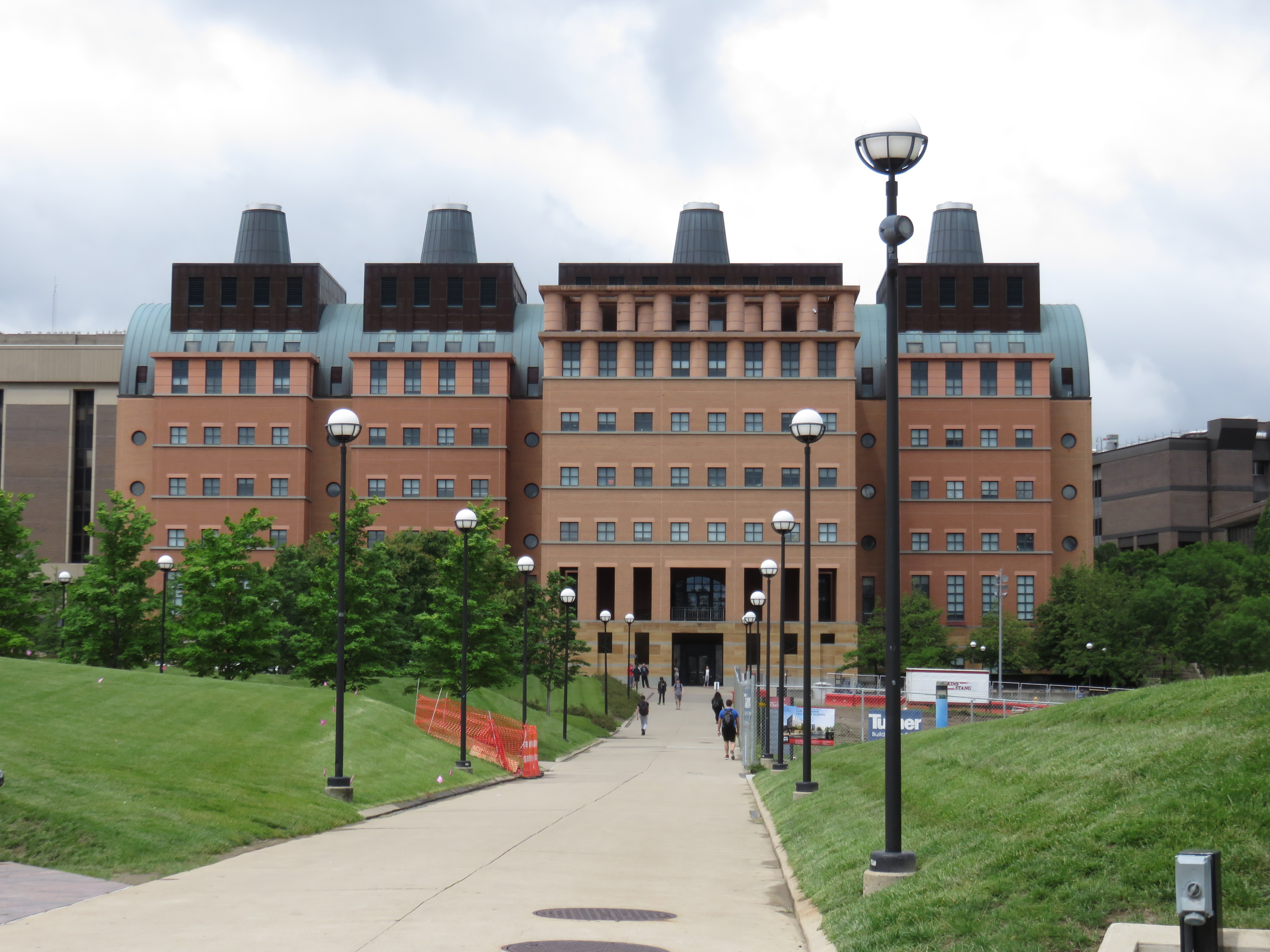
The Engineering Research Center, designed by UC alumnus Michael Graves, was designed to look like a four-cylinder engine.

Numerous buildings on campus were designed by notable architects, causing the university to receive attention from architects and campus planners for beauty and design.

| Building | Architect | Year |
|---|---|---|
| Crosley Tower | A.M. Kinney Associates | 1969 |
| Engineering Research Center | Michael Graves | 1994 |
| Aronoff Center for Art and Design | Peter Eisenman | 1996 |
| College-Conservatory of Music | Pei Cobb Freed and Partners (Henry Cobb) | 1999 |
| Vontz Center for Molecular Studies | Frank Gehry | 1999 |
| Tangeman University Center | Gwathmey Siegel & Associates Architects | 2004 |
| Steger Student Life Center | Moore Ruble Yudell | 2005 |
| Campus Recreation Center | Morphosis (Thom Mayne) | 2006 |
| Lindner Athletic Center | Bernard Tschumi | 2006 |
| Care/Crawley Building | STUDIOS Architecture | 2008 |

Off-campus facilities include the Center Hill Research Facility, UC Reading Campus & UC Metabolic Diseases Institute, Cincinnati Center for Field Studies, Cincinnati Observatory, and 1819 Building.

=== Regional campuses and online ===
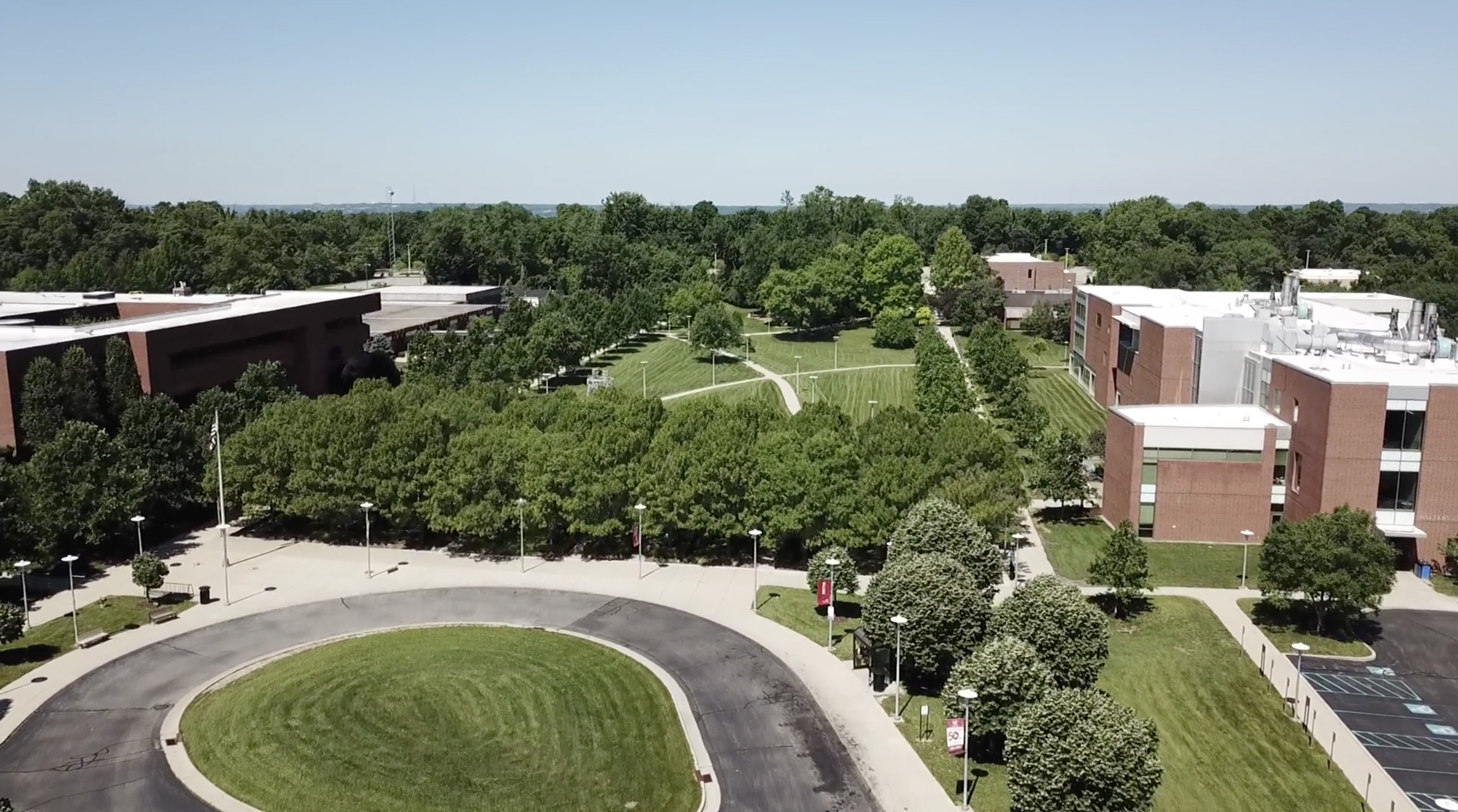
An aerial view of UC Blue Ash College

Blue Ash College was founded in 1967 as the first regional campus of the university. It is located in Blue Ash, Ohio. The Clermont College in Batavia, Ohio, opened in 1972. Both campuses offer associate's and bachelor's programs, and students who begin their degrees at UC's regional campuses have the opportunity to transition to the Uptown campus to complete their degree.

UC Online offers over 120 graduate, undergraduate and certificate programs through an online distance education platform.

=== Sustainability ===
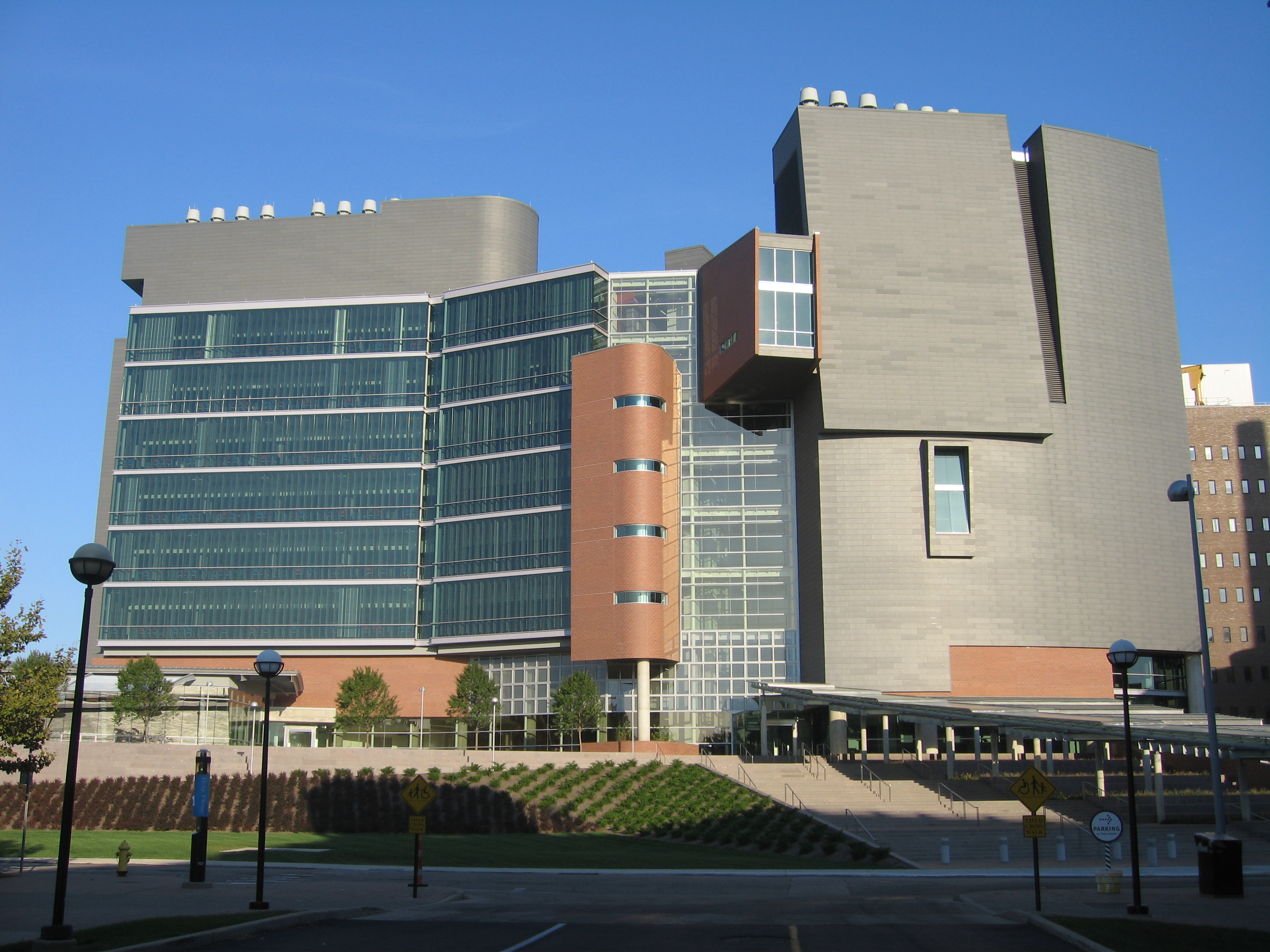
The CARE/Crawley Building on the UC Academic Health Center campus

In the autumn of 2010, the University of Cincinnati maintained its position in green and sustainability initiatives by being named one of only 286 "Green Colleges" by The Princeton Review. The university has received this distinction each year since. UC was the only public university in Ohio and the only university in the Southern Ohio region included on this list. Some of the programs that helped achieve this distinction include: a bike share program where UC students can rent bikes from the university, an expanded recycling program, improved and expanded campus transportation options, the addition of vehicle charging stations, fuel pellet use in place of coal, greatly decreased energy and water use throughout campus, and the addition of 6 Leadership in Energy and Environmental Design (LEED) certified buildings since 2005. In 2007, former university president Nancy Zimpher signed the American College & University Presidents' Climate Commitment, which confirms the university's dedication to reducing its environmental impact and take the necessary steps to become climate neutral.

In 2010, UC opened up a privately funded athletic practice facility and women's lacrosse stadium named Sheakley Athletic Complex. As a continued effort to go green, a chilled water thermal energy storage tank was placed under the fields and at night water is chilled and then used to air-condition buildings on campus. The storage tank helps the university reach annual energy savings of about $1 million. In the fall of 2010, the university began placing "All Recycling" containers throughout campus. This expansion of recycling efforts and receptacles provides a greater opportunity for students, staff, and visitors to participate in recycling a broader range of materials. In 2010, UC recycled just over 4,600 tons of material, which was a 23 percent increase over the previous year.

== Academics ==
=== Undergraduate admissions ===
Undergraduate admissions statistics
- 2023 entering class
- Admit rate: 87.7% (▲ +14.6)
- Yield rate: 23.8% (▼ −7.5)

Test scores middle 50%^{[i]}
- SAT Total: 1160–1340 (among 11% of FTFs)
- ACT Composite: 24–29 (among 36% of FTFs)

High school GPA
- Average: 3.7

Admission to the University of Cincinnati is classified as "selective" in the Carnegie Classification of Institutions of Higher Education. The Princeton Review gives Cincinnati an "Admissions Selectivity Rating" of 85 out of 99. The college extends offers of admission to 87.7% of all applicants after holistic review that includes examination of academic rigor, performance and admissions test scores.

Of all matriculating students, the average high school GPA is 3.7. The interquartile range for SAT scores in math and reading are 570–690 and 580–670 respectively, while the range for ACT scores is 24–29.

=== Reputation and rankings ===
Academic rankings

National
- Forbes: 278
- U.S. News & World Report: 179 (tie)
- Washington Monthly: 461
- WSJ/College Pulse: 527

Global
- ARWU: 301–400
- THE: 251-300
- U.S. News & World Report: 213 (tie)

In its 2026 rankings, U.S. News & World Report ranked the university 179th (tied) among 428 national universities, and tied for 91st among public national universities. U.S. News also ranks UC 3rd for co-ops/internships. Amongst global universities, UC was ranked 213th (tied) of 2,604.

=== Colleges and schools ===
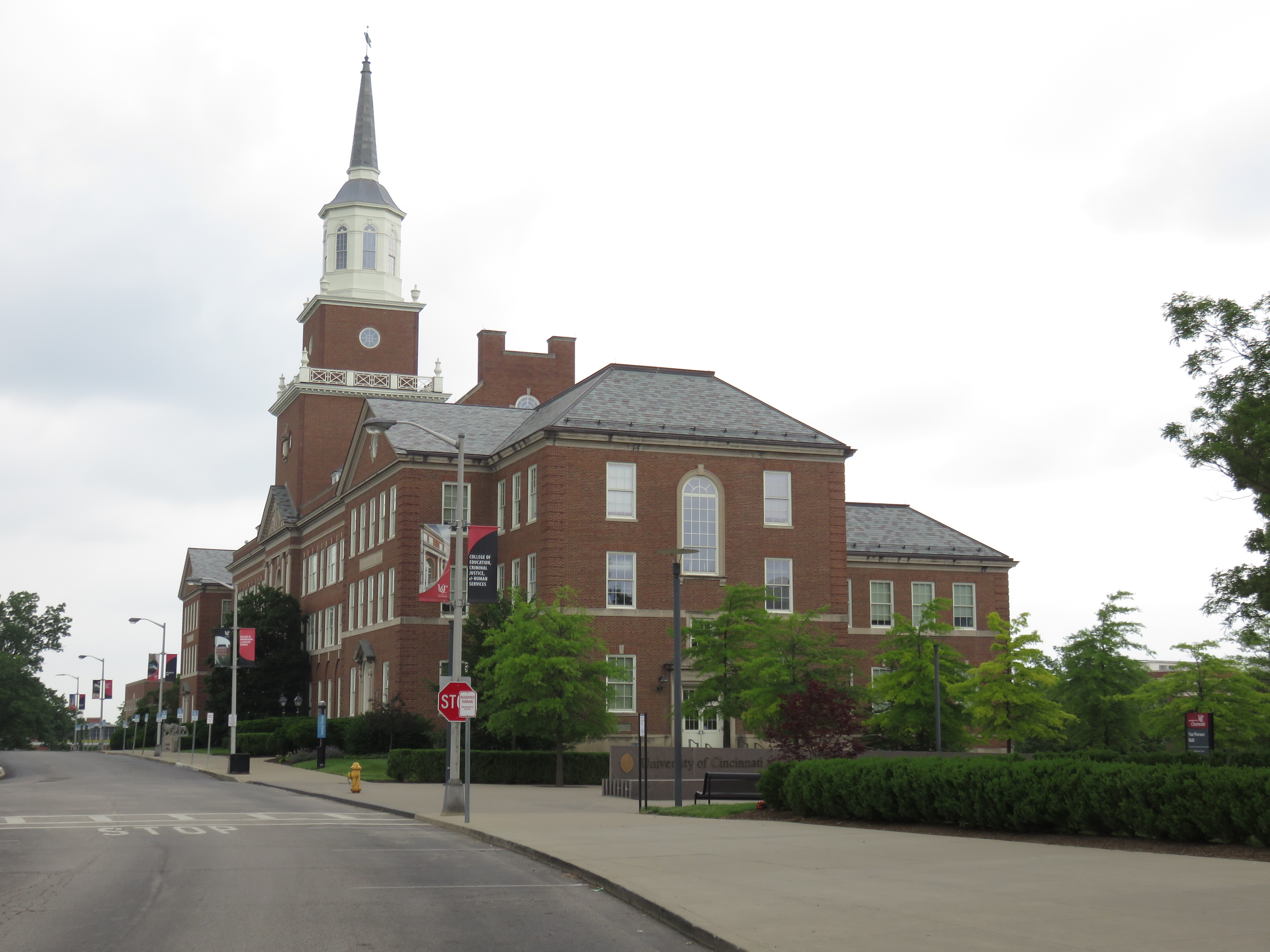
Arts & Sciences Hall on the Uptown campus

The university is divided into 14 colleges:

- College of Allied Health Sciences
  - School of Social Work
- College of Arts and Sciences
- Carl H. Lindner College of Business
- College-Conservatory of Music
- College of Cooperative Education and Professional Studies
- College of Design, Architecture, Art, and Planning
- College of Education, Criminal Justice, and Human Services
- College of Engineering and Applied Science
- Graduate College
- Donald P. Klekamp College of Law
- College of Medicine
- College of Nursing
- James L. Winkle College of Pharmacy

The College of Arts and Sciences is the university's largest college, with 21 departments, eight co-op programs, and several interdisciplinary programs. Winston Koch invented the first electronic organ at the College of Engineering and Applied Science. The College of Law is the alma mater of 27th U.S. president and 10th chief justice William Howard Taft, who also served as the college's dean when it integrated with the University of Cincinnati in 1896.

The College of Medicine is the university's medical school; it includes a leading teaching hospital and several biomedical research laboratories. In the 1950s Albert Sabin developed the live polio vaccine at the College of Medicine. Diphenhydramine (Benadryl) was developed here by George Rieveschl in 1946. UC also established the first emergency medicine residency program. In 2008, it became the first medical college in the country to implement the multiple mini interview system for its admission process.

The university has two regional campuses: Blue Ash College in Blue Ash, Ohio, and Clermont College in Batavia, Ohio.

UC is also the home of the Institute for Policy Research, a multidisciplinary research organization which opened in 1971. The center performs a variety of surveys and polls on public opinion throughout Ohio, Kentucky, and Indiana, primarily through telephone surveys.

=== Co-operative education ===
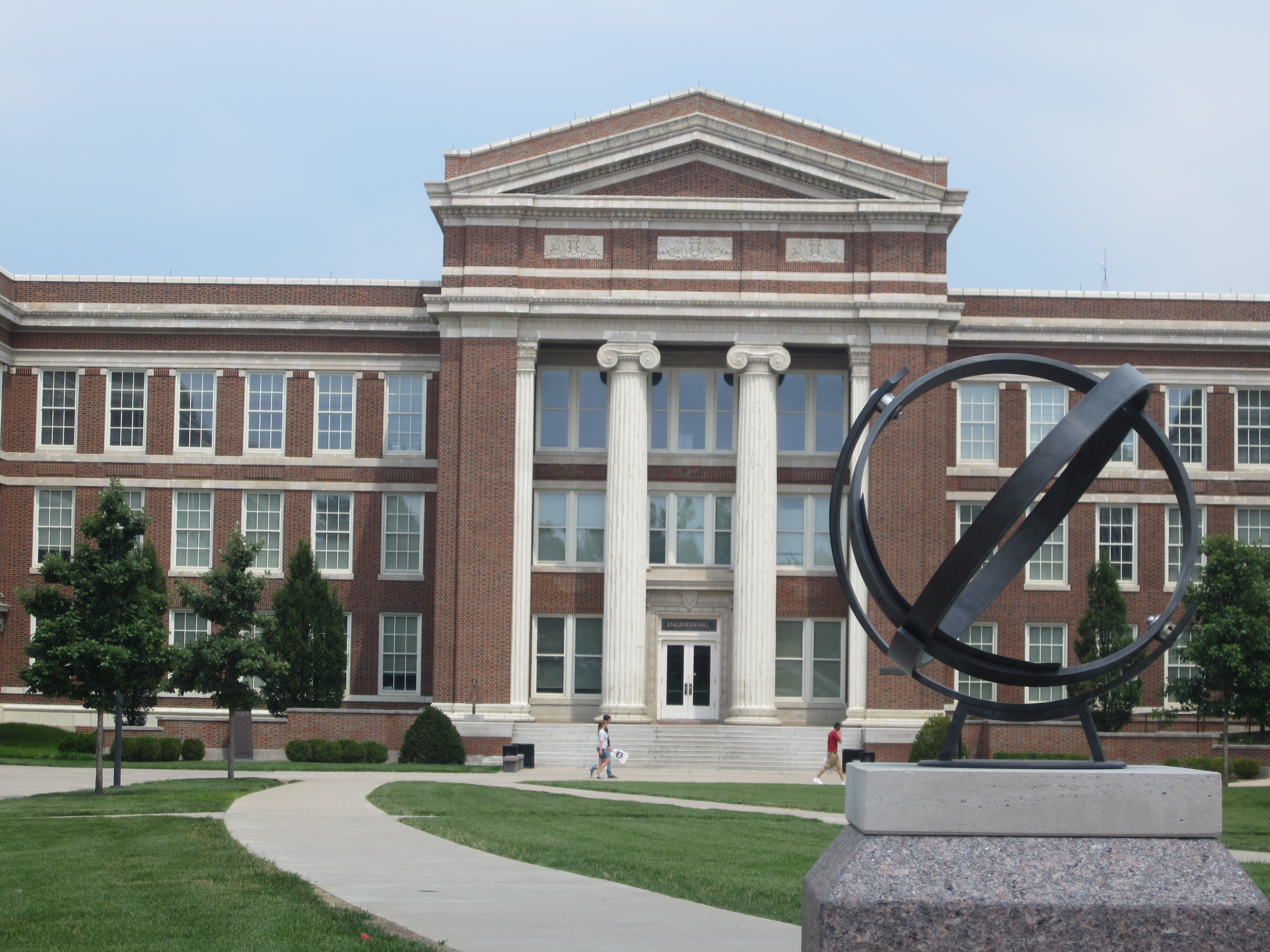
Baldwin Hall, home of the College of Engineering and Applied Science

The University of Cincinnati is the originator of the co-operative education (Co-Op) model. The concept was invented at UC in 1906 by Herman Schneider, Dean of the College of Engineering at the time. The program generally consists of alternating semesters of coursework on campus and outside work at a host firm, giving students over one year of relevant work experience by the time they graduate. All programs in the College of Engineering and Applied Science, Architecture programs, all design programs in the College of Design, Architecture, Art, and Planning, and Information Technology in the College of Education, Criminal Justice, and Human Services, require co-operative education experience to graduate.

=== University Honors Program ===
Each year UC welcomes roughly 375 students, or usually the top 5–8% of students, to the University Honors Program. Students admitted into the Honors program typically meet the following qualifications: an ACT composite score of 32 or higher, an SAT score of 1400 or higher (critical reading and math combined), and either an unweighted high school GPA of 3.6 or a weighted high school GPA of 3.8.

The program is centered around students taking part in "experiences". Experiences are defined as "fall[ing] within one of five competencies: community engagement, creativity, global studies, leadership, and research." Experiences could take the form of Honors Seminars, which are certain three credit-hour courses, Pre-Approved Experiences, which consist of programs the Honors Program has already deemed to meet the requirements of an experience, and Self-Designed Experiences, where students design their own experience plan to submit to the Honors Program for approval. Students are required to complete at least five experiences before graduation.

== Research ==
The university is classified among "R1: Doctoral Universities – Very high research activity". According to the National Science Foundation, UC spent $739 million on research and development in 2024, ranking it 50th in the nation

=== Libraries ===
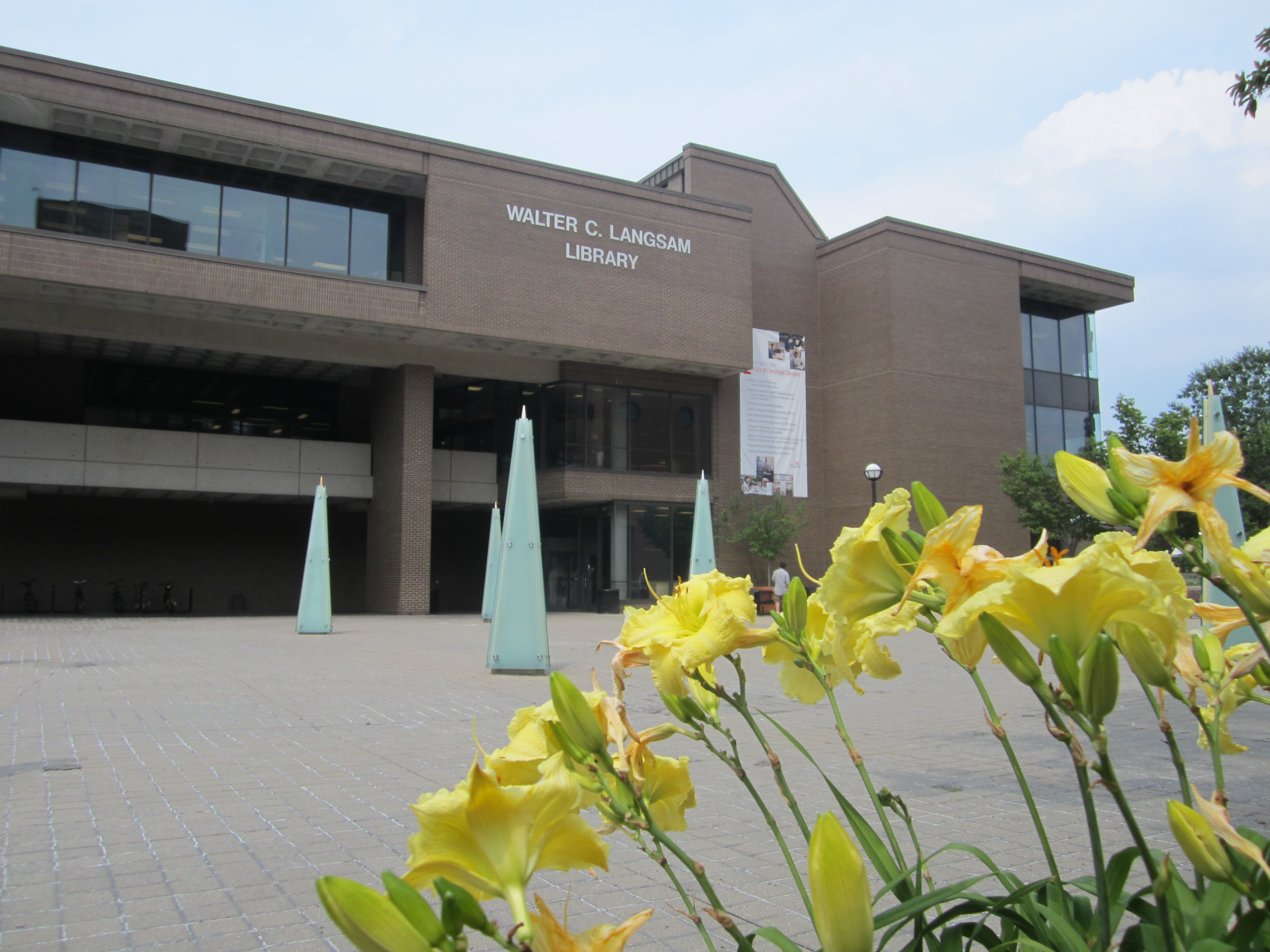
Walter C. Langsam Library is the main library at UC.

The University of Cincinnati has 13 libraries, which are housed in 11 different facilities. The university library system has holdings of over 4 million volumes and 70,000 periodicals. The average circulation is around 451,815 items and 116,532 reference transactions. The University of Cincinnati is a member of the Association of Research Libraries and the OhioLINK consortium of libraries.

- Walter C. Langsam Library (main library)
- Donald C. Harrison Health Sciences Library
- Archives and Rare Books Library
- Ralph E. Oesper Chemistry-Biology Library
- John Miller Burnam Classical Library
- Albino Gorno Memorial Music (CCM) Library
- Robert A. Deshon and Karl J. Schlachter Library for Design, Architecture, Art, and Planning (DAAP)
- College of Education, Criminal Justice, and Human Services Library
- College of Engineering and Applied Science (CEAS) Library
- Geology-Mathematics-Physics Library
- Robert S. Marx Law Library
- Clermont College Library
- Blue Ash College Library

== Student life ==
Student body composition as of May 2, 2022
| Race and ethnicity | Total |
|---|---|
| White | 74% |
| Black | 7% |
| Other (Note: Other consists of multiracial Americans & those who prefer to not say.) | 7% |
| Asian | 5% |
| Hispanic | 4% |
| Foreign national | 4% |
Economic diversity
| Low-income (Note: The percentage of students who received an income-based federal Pell grant intended for low-income students.) | 18% |
| Affluent (Note: The percentage of students who are a part of the American middle class at the bare minimum.) | 82% |

=== Housing ===
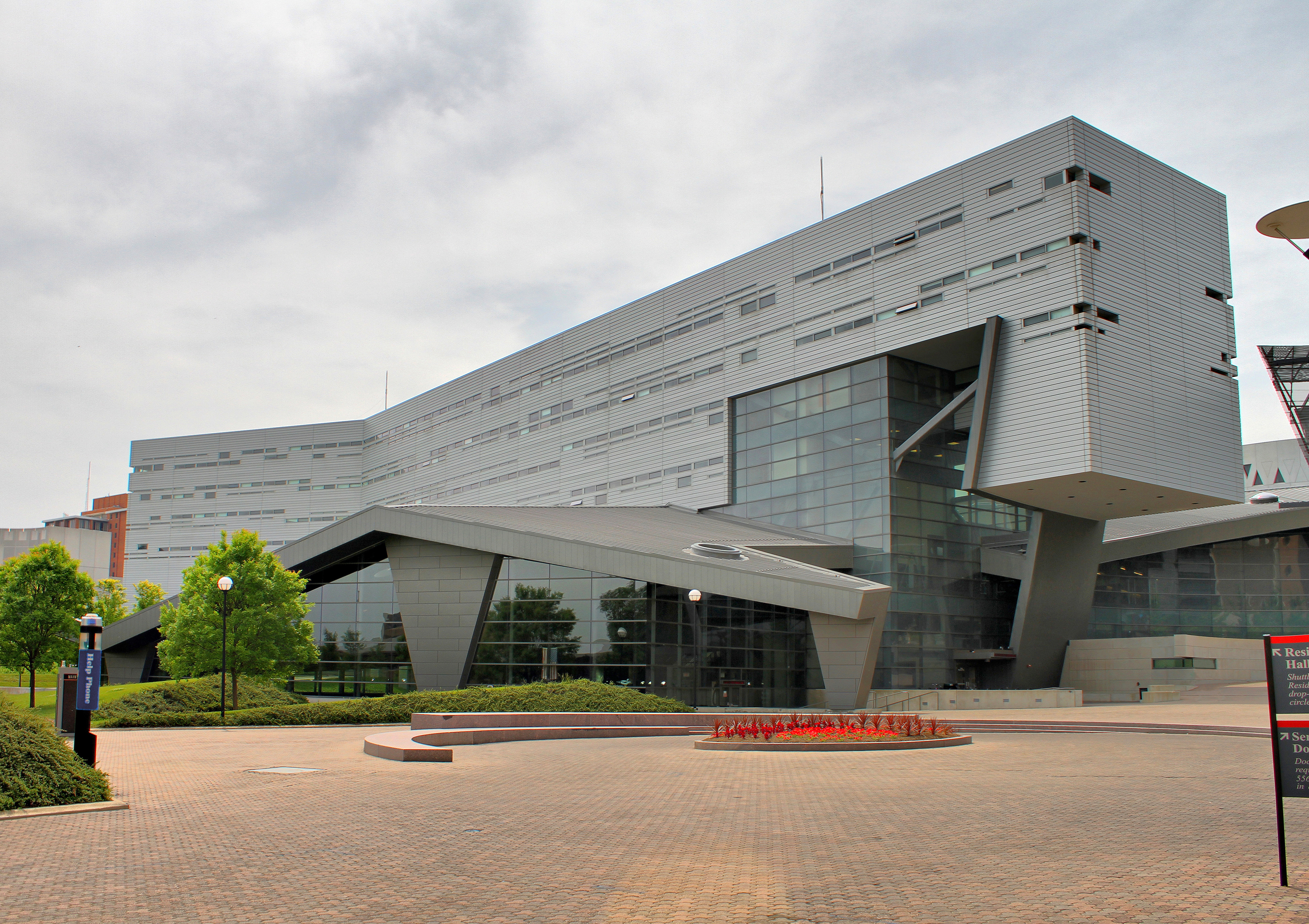
Campus Recreation Center Residence Hall, one of the newer dormitories on campus

6,500 students live on campus in ten residence halls that offer both traditional and suite style options. Students also have the option to live in themed housing, which include honors, business, and STEM-specific floors. In the fall of 2012, Campus Recreation Center Housing (CRC) was named on The Fiscal Times' list of "10 Public Colleges with Insanely Luxurious Dorms". Nearly 80% of Uptown Campus incoming freshman students live on campus their first year.

In recent years, record freshman classes and increased interest by upperclass students has led to higher demand than supply for on-campus residence halls. To meet this demand, UC Housing and Food Services has added residence halls (Morgens Hall in 2013) and purchased block leases at University Park Apartments, Campus Park Apartments (formerly Sterling Manor), University Edge Apartments, and Stetson Square Apartments near campus. This has pushed the "on-campus" housing student population higher. UC's largest residence hall, Calhoun, was recently renovated, being finished in January 2023. Neighbors to Calhoun, Siddall Hall closed for renovation in December 2023 and is set to reopen in August 2024. UC Housing & Food Services manages ten undergraduate residence halls.

The university also offers limited housing to graduate students. Bellevue Gardens is an apartment community owned and operated by the university. It is located close to the Academic Health Center (AHC) and medical campus. Two off-campus university-affiliated (but not university-managed) housing options were introduced in 2005: Stratford Heights and University Park Apartments. All leases in the Stratford Heights housing area have been terminated, and control of the housing complex reverted to University control as a residence hall in the summer of 2009.

=== Programs ===
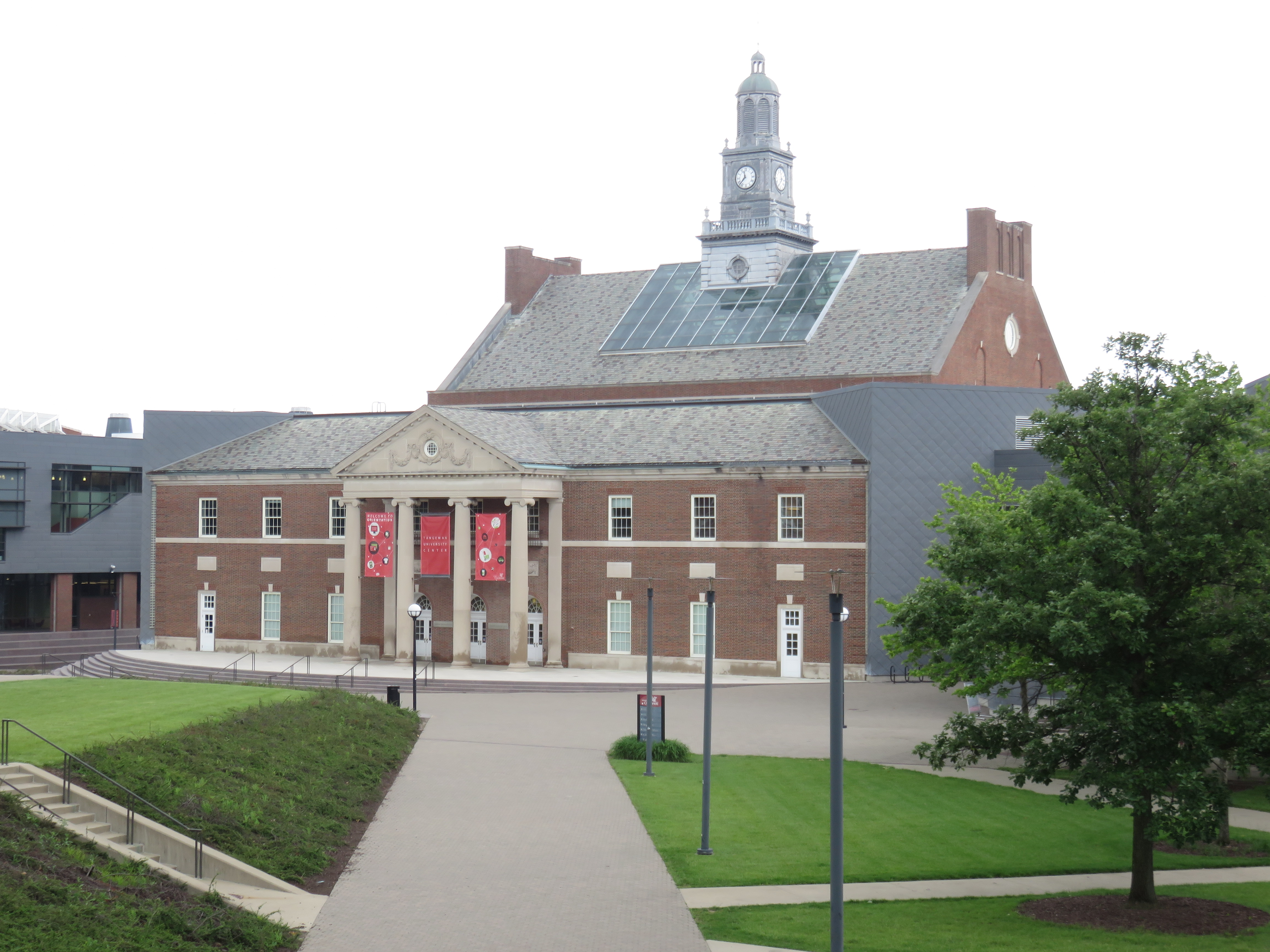
The Tangeman University Center, designed by Gwathmey Siegel & Associates Architects, houses several food courts and other student amenities.

The Center for First-Year Experience provides leadership for each student's first-year experience and related academic program. The center serves as a resource for all the university's undergraduate colleges and programs. The program is a collaboration between UC colleges, academic programs, and student groups and is designed to help freshmen with the transition from high school to college.

Learning communities are groups of about 20–25 students as well as faculty. Students take two classes together throughout their first year on campus, based on their major or area of study. There are nearly 120 learning communities to choose from. They are offered in the following colleges: College of Allied Health Sciences, College of Business, College of Education, Criminal Justice, and Human Services, College of Engineering & Applied Sciences, College of Nursing, and the College of Arts & Sciences. A few majors require freshmen to be in these learning communities. Many of these groups have specialized courses taught by their academic advisor.

The Transition and Access Program, which does not lead to a degree, allows certain disabled adults to take classes, interact with other students, and intern at companies. After four years, participants receive a certificate of completion.

The University of Cincinnati was one of the first universities in the country to be classified by the Carnegie Foundation for the Advancement of Teaching as a Community Engagement focused university and was one of only 35 research universities on this list.

=== Student organizations ===
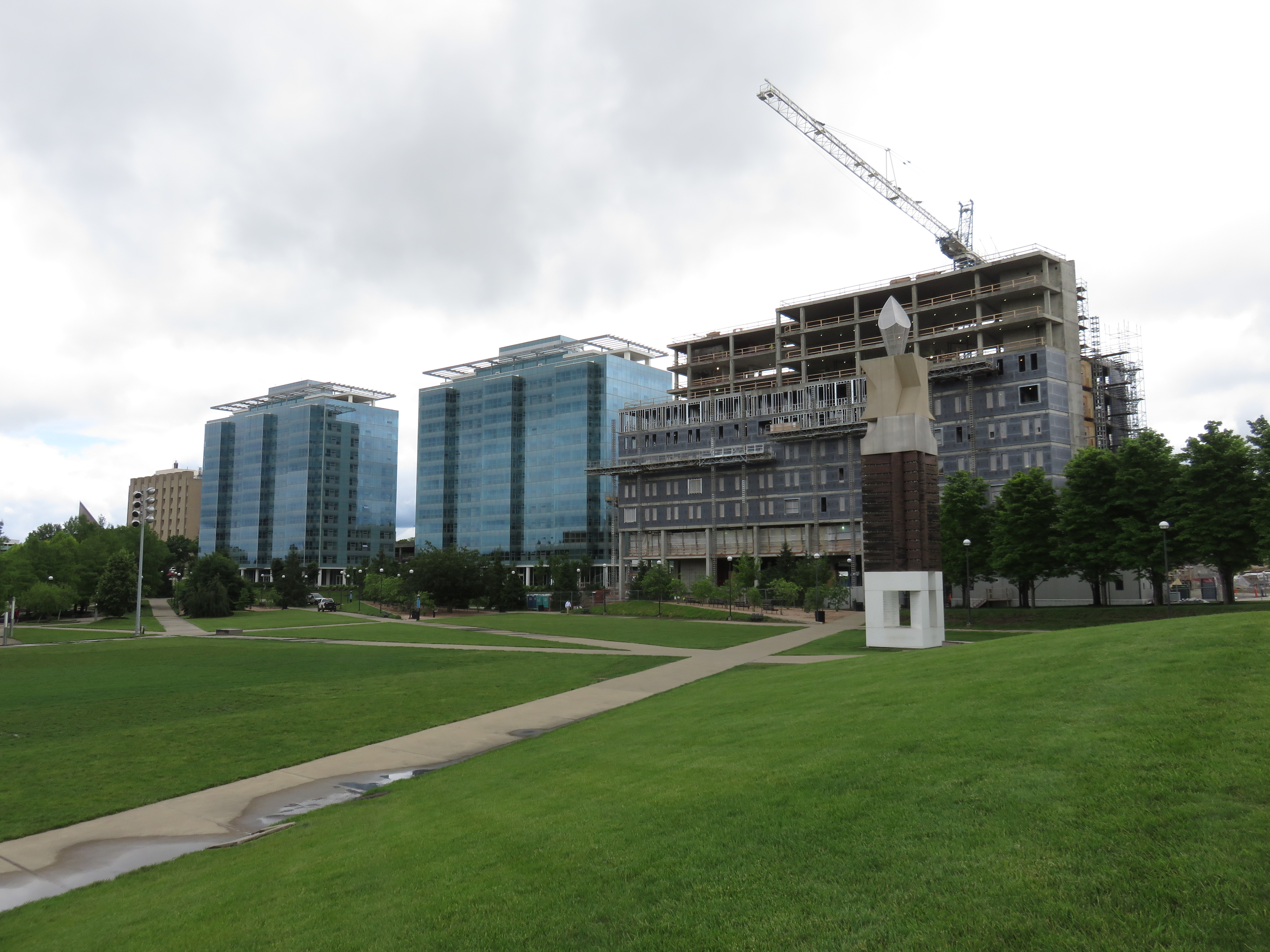
The Campus Green activity space in 2017

Student Activities & Leadership Development (SALD) oversees over 550 registered student organizations ranging from student government to religious organizations to spirit groups. Housed in the Steger Student Life Center, the divisions overseeing these groups include Club Sports Board, Diversity Education, Greek Life, Leadership Development, Programming, RAPP, Undergraduate Student Government and Graduate Student Government. Other Student Life offices on campus include the African American Cultural & Resource Center, Bearcat Bands (the largest and oldest student group at UC), Early Learning Center, Ethnic Programs & Services, University Judicial Affairs, Resident Education & Development, Wellness Center, and Women's Center.

=== Greek life ===
Fraternities and sororities have been a part of the university since 1840. There are over 2,500 students participating in fraternities and sororities, which represents approximately 11% of the undergraduate population (Uptown Campus). 52 chapters have called UC home over the years, and currently includes 39 social fraternities and sororities: 21 Interfraternity Council fraternities, nine Panhellenic Council sororities, seven National Pan-Hellenic Council (three fraternities and four sororities), and two non-affiliated (Delta Phi Lambda and Phi Sigma Rho) organizations.

=== Media ===
There are several media outlets for university students. The student newspaper, The News Record, has been in production for more than 130 years, taking its current name in 1936. It is an independent, student-run newspaper and not attached to any academic program; therefore any student, regardless of program, is able to apply and work for the newspaper. A student-run radio station named Bearcast is housed in the College-Conservatory of Music on campus. The programming streams online as opposed to a traditional radio station and, like the News Record, is open to any student attending the university. There is also a television station called UCast.

The 48-hour Cindependent Film Festival is held each year for the general public. The festival has featured guest speakers and filmmakers including Fraser Kershaw, as well as speakers and artists from Kenyatta University in Nairobi, Kenya. Actors, directors, editors, and composers are showcased at the MainStreet Cinema for students and professionals.

== Athletics ==
Baseball Hall of Fame member Sandy Koufax is regarded as one of the sport's greatest pitchers.

The university competes in 19 Division I (NCAA) sports, and its athletics teams are known as the "Bearcats". Since July 1, 2023, Cincinnati has been a member of the Big 12 Conference. They were previously members of the American Athletic Conference (The American), Big East Conference, Conference USA (of which they were a founding member), the Great Midwest Conference, the Metro Conference, and the Mid-American Conference, among others.

The university hosts various club sports, some of which are distinguished as Club Varsity. Some include the Bearcat hockey team and the club rowing team, which produced 2000 and 2004 Olympian Kelly Salchow.

Notable Cincinnati Bearcats athletes include Sandy Koufax, Miller Huggins, Oscar Robertson, Jack Twyman, Omar Cummings, Kenyon Martin, Travis Kelce, Jason Kelce, Mary Wineberg and Tony Trabert.

=== National championships ===
The university has four individual and six team championships. The Bearcats won the NCAA Men's Division I Basketball Championship in 1961 and 1962, both times against the Ohio State Buckeyes. Charles Keating won the 1946 200-meter butterfly national title for UC as a member of the men's swimming team, and, most recently, Josh Schneider did the same in the 50-yard (46 m) freestyle in 2010. In women's diving, Pat Evans (3 m dive – 1989) and Becky Ruehl (10 m dive – 1996) have brought home titles for the Bearcats. The UC dance team has won four National Championships from 2004 through 2006 and again in 2009. They are the first team in UC history to capture three consecutive national titles. They remain one of the top dance programs in the country and are the winningest team in University of Cincinnati history. In 2009 the dance team was also selected to represent the United States in the first world dance championships where they won the gold medal in all three dance categories.

=== Athletic facilities ===
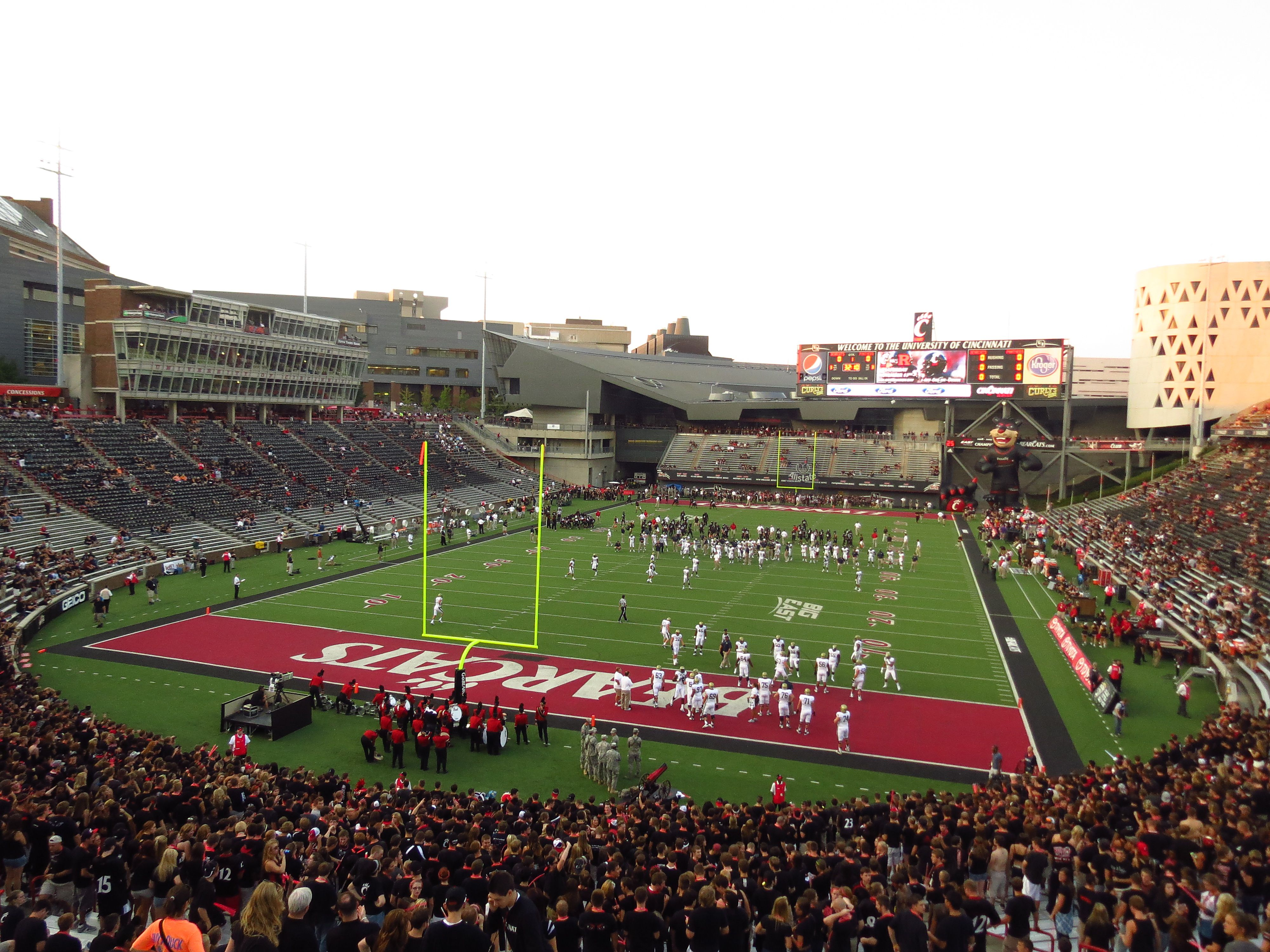
Nippert Stadium is home to the Cincinnati Bearcats football program.

All of the athletic facilities, with the exception of Fifth Third Arena and UC Baseball Stadium, are open 24/7 for student use.

The Richard E. Lindner Varsity Village, a key feature of UC's athletic complex, was commissioned as part of the university's entry into the Big East Conference. Opened in 2006, it serves as the hub of UC's athletic facilities. The complex includes the Richard E. Lindner Center, which offers spaces for training, meetings, studying, and classrooms, as well as the George and Helen Smith Athletics Museum. The Varsity Village project also includes several notable venues: Gettler Stadium, home to the soccer team; the Trabert-Talbert Tennis Center; UC Baseball Stadium, which replaced Johnny Bench Field; and Sheakley Lawn, an open athletic field for student use.

Nippert Stadium serves as the home field for the Cincinnati Bearcats football team and occasionally hosts women's lacrosse games. A permanent home for UC football, the Indoor Practice Facility & Performance Center is being built on the site of Sheakley Field. The field will provide an all-weather home for Cincinnati football practices and year-round workouts and have direct access to the Performance Center's weight room, training room and performance nutrition fueling stations. Construction started in April 2023, and the facility was opened on 12 June 2025.

The UC Baseball Stadium is the home field for the Cincinnati Bearcats baseball team. In 2020, former Cincinnati Reds owner and alumna Marge Schott's name was removed from the name of the UC Baseball Stadium, following a unanimous vote by the university's board of trustees. The vote was in response to a petition by former UC baseball player Jordan Ramey which garnered nearly 10,000 signatures.

The Armory Fieldhouse is home to UC's indoor track and field teams, and it was once the venue for the men's and women's basketball teams. Fifth Third Arena is the current home for UC's men's and women's basketball teams, as well as the volleyball team. Ben and Dee Gettler Stadium is where the women's soccer team and the men's and women's track and field teams compete. The Trabert-Talbert Tennis Center is dedicated to the UC women's tennis team. The Keating Aquatics Center is home to the UC men's and women's swimming and diving teams.
