= List of colleges and universities in Ohio =

The U.S. state of Ohio is home to a number of public and private institutions of higher learning. Prior to statehood, the Northwest Ordinance of 1787 included a provision to establish an institution of higher education in what became Ohio. American Western University was chartered in 1802 as a result, but never opened. Two years later, the new Ohio General Assembly chartered Ohio University, which opened for classes in 1809, followed by Miami University, which was chartered in 1809 and opened in 1824. In northern Ohio, Western Reserve College (now Case Western Reserve University) was established in 1826.

== Institutions ==
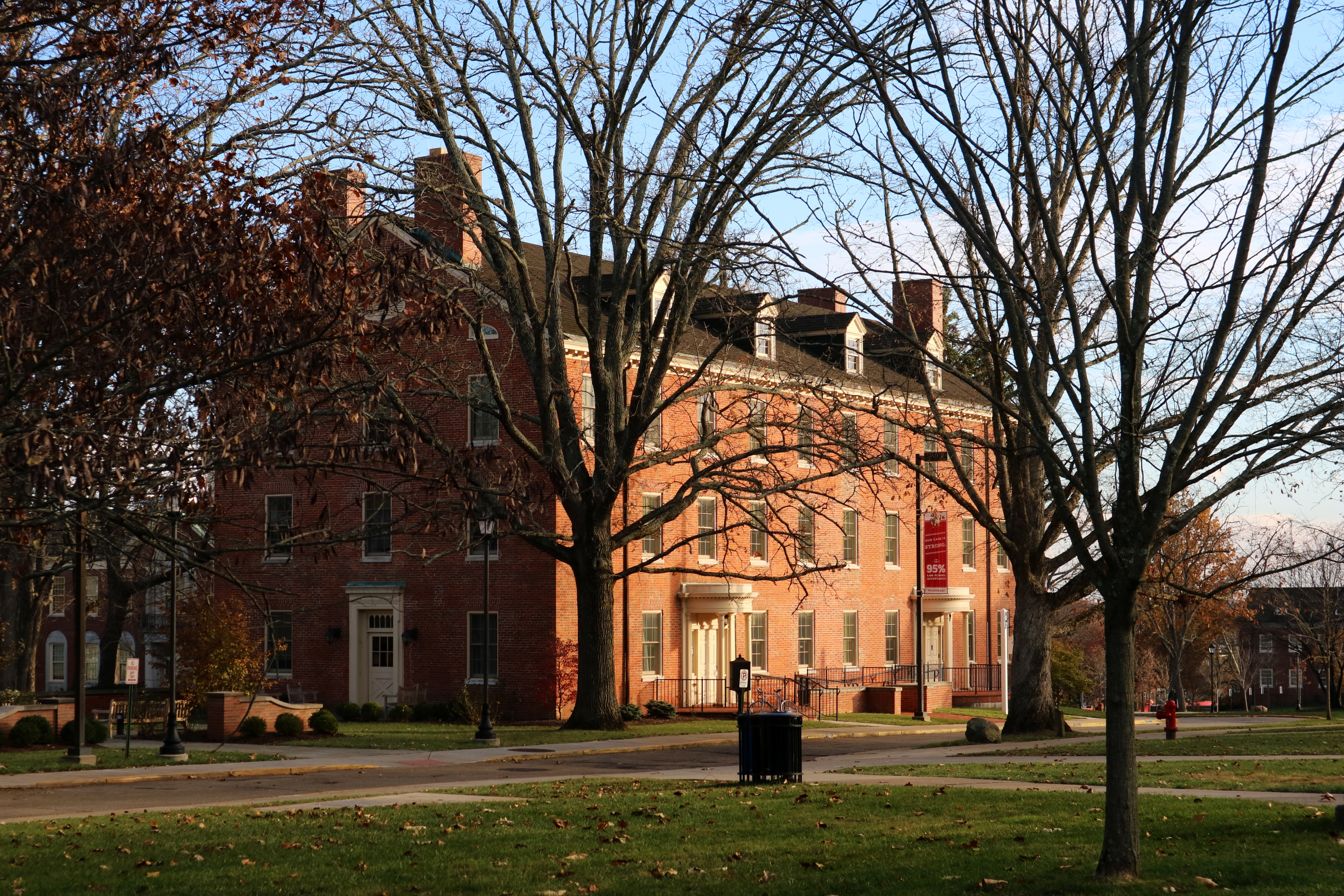
Stoddard Hall at Miami University

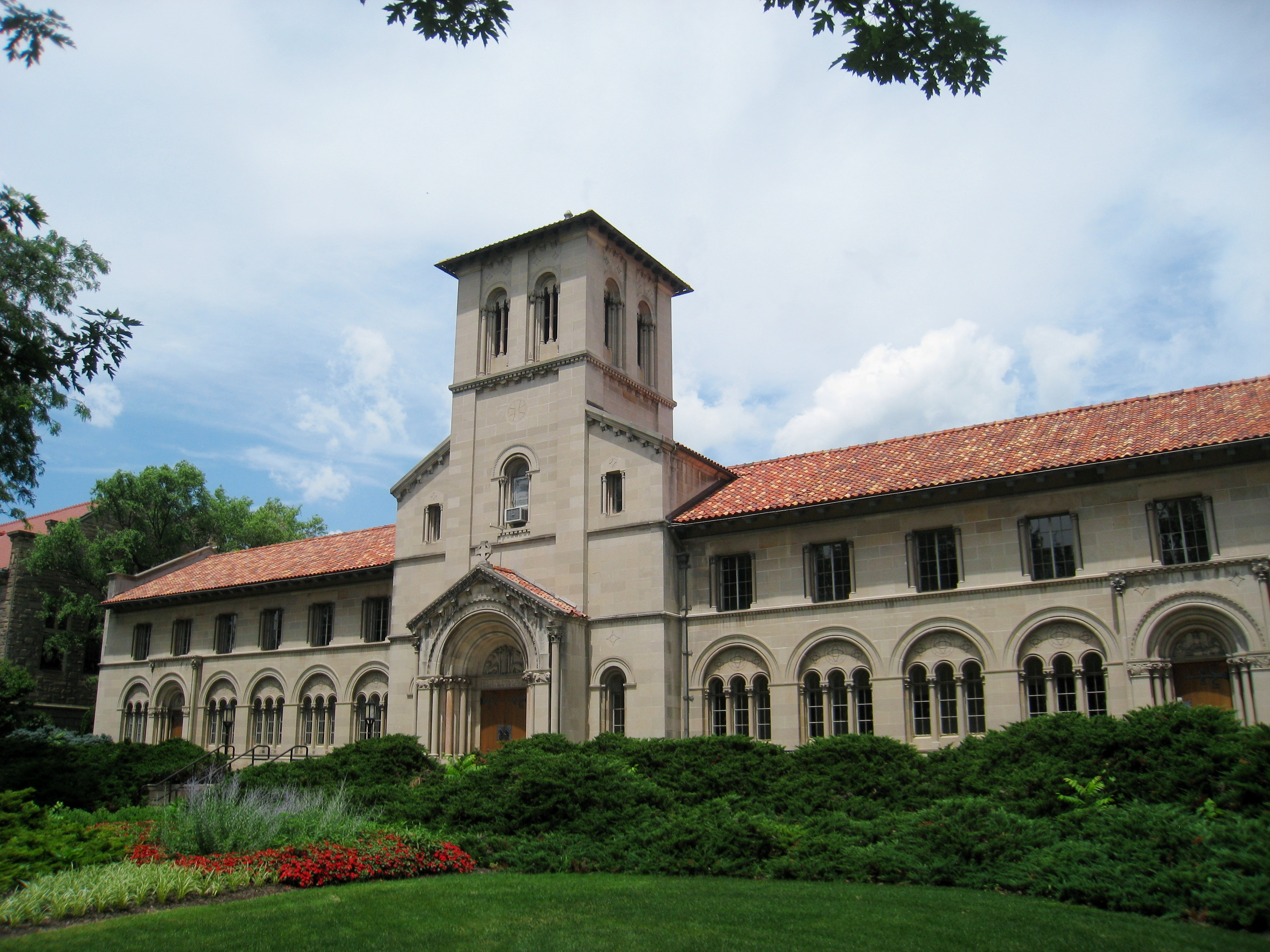
Bosworth Hall at Oberlin College

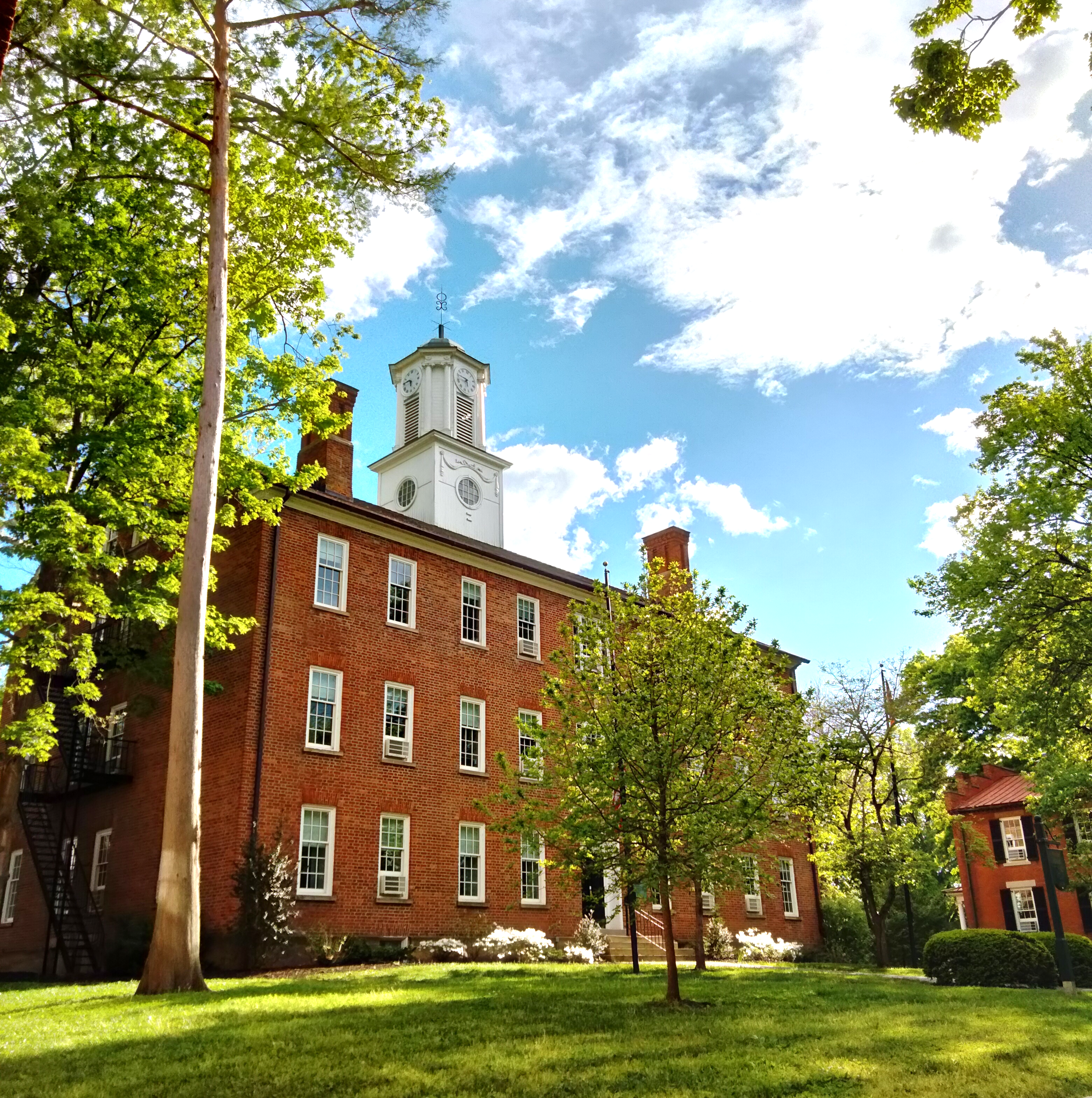
Manasseh Cutler Hall at Ohio University

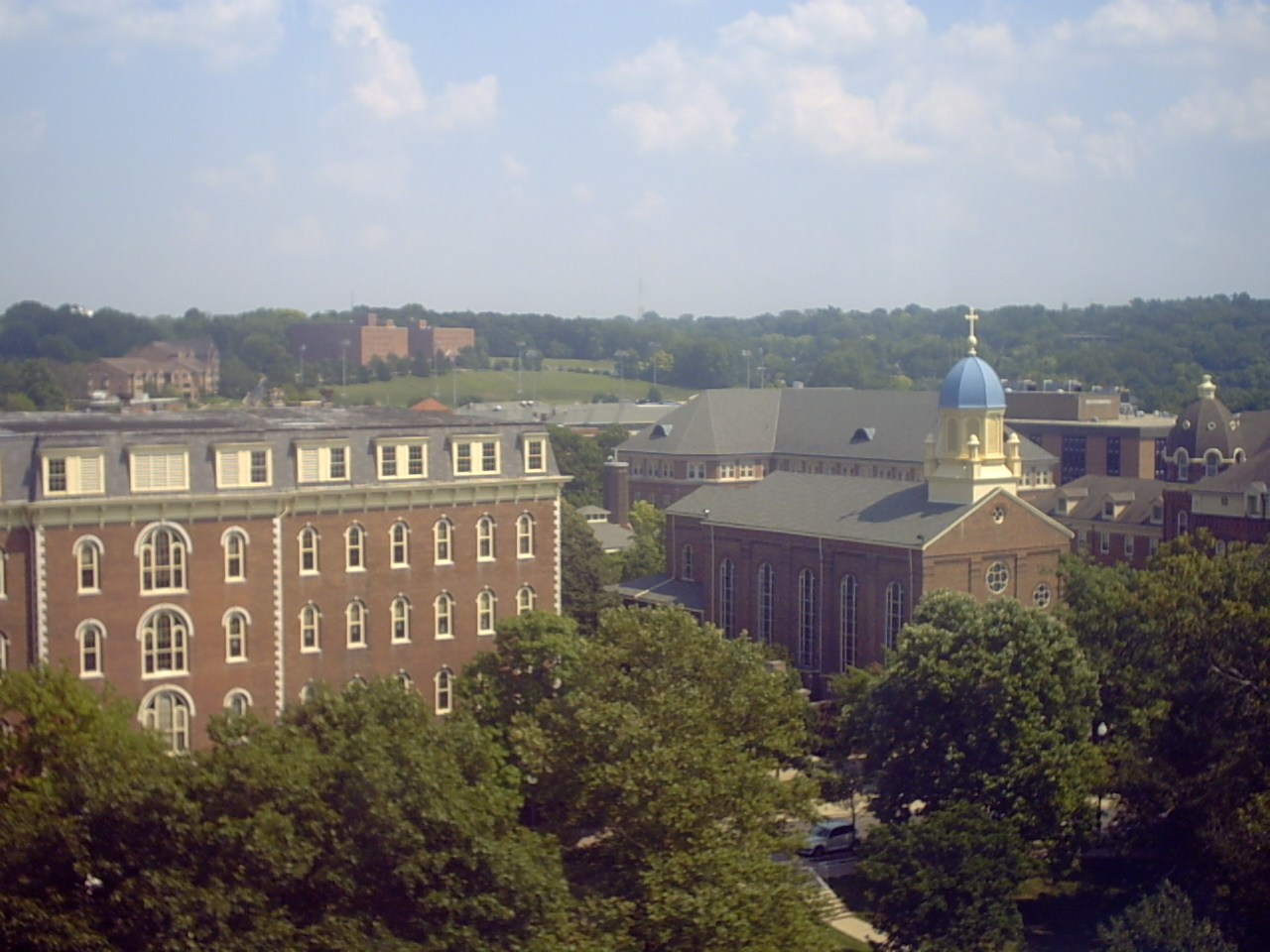
The Immaculate Conception Chapel at the University of Dayton

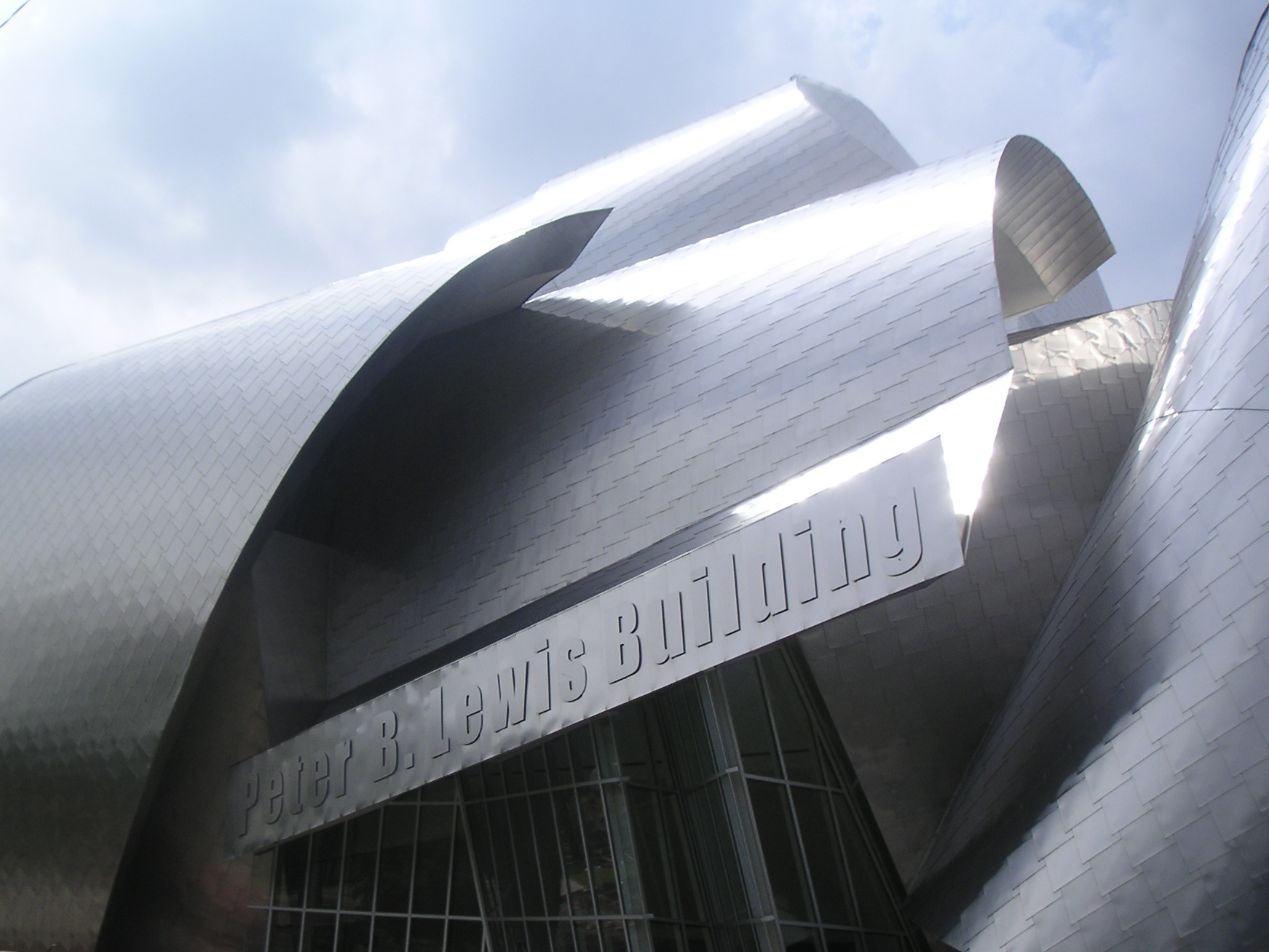
Frank Gehry-designed Peter B. Lewis Building at Case Western Reserve University

Active institutions
School	Location(s)	Control	Type	Enrollment (fall 2024)	Founded
Air Force Institute of Technology	Wright-Patterson Air Force Base	Public	Doctoral Universities: High Research Activity	1,070	1919
Allegheny Wesleyan College	Salem	Private not-for profit	Special Focus Four-Year: Faith-Related Institutions	60	1957
American Institute of Alternative Medicine	Columbus	Private for-profit	Special Focus Four-Year: Other Health Professions Schools	251	1990
Antioch College	Yellow Springs	Private not-for profit	Baccalaureate Colleges: Arts & Sciences Focus	121	1850
Antioch University	Yellow Springs	Private not-for profit	Baccalaureate Colleges: Arts & Sciences Focus (Antioch University Online); Special Focus Four-Year: Business & Management Schools (PhD Program in Leadership and Change)	486	1988
Art Academy of Cincinnati	Cincinnati	Private not-for profit	Special Focus Four-Year: Arts, Music & Design Schools	213	1869
Ashland University	Ashland	Private not-for profit	Master's Colleges & Universities: Larger Programs	6,419	1878
ATA College-Cincinnati	Cincinnati	Private for-profit	Special Focus Two-Year: Health Professions	266	1994
Athena Career Academy	Toledo	Private for-profit	Special Focus Two-Year: Other Fields	516	2010
Athenaeum of Ohio	Cincinnati	Private (Catholic) not-for profit	Special Focus Four-Year: Faith-Related Institutions	156	1829
Aultman College of Nursing and Health Sciences	Canton	Private not-for profit	Special Focus Four-Year: Other Health Professions Schools	286	1892
Baldwin Wallace University	Berea	Private not-for profit	Master's Colleges & Universities: Larger Programs	3,305	1845
Belmont College	St. Clairsville	Public	Associate's Colleges: High Career & Technical-Mixed Traditional/Nontraditional	2,020	1971
Bluffton University	Bluffton	Private not-for profit	Baccalaureate Colleges: Diverse Fields	646	1899
Bowling Green State University-Firelands	Huron	Public	Associate's Colleges: Mixed Transfer/Career & Technical-Mixed Traditional/Nontraditional	2,097	1968
Bowling Green State University-Main Campus	Bowling Green	Public	Doctoral Universities: High Research Activity	17,594	1910
Bryant & Stratton College	Akron, Parma, and Solon	Private not-for profit	Baccalaureate/Associate's Colleges: Associate's Dominant	624	1854
Capital University	Bexley	Private not-for profit	Master's Colleges & Universities: Larger Programs	2,263	1830
Case Western Reserve University	Cleveland	Private not-for profit	Doctoral Universities: Very High Research Activity	12,475	1826
Cedarville University	Cedarville	Private not-for profit	Master's Colleges & Universities: Medium Programs	6,318	1887
Central Ohio Technical College	Newark	Public	Associate's Colleges: High Career & Technical-High Nontraditional	3,182	1971
Central State University	Wilberforce	Public	Baccalaureate Colleges: Diverse Fields	2,708	1887
Cincinnati State Technical and Community College	Cincinnati	Public	Associate's college	9,683	1969
Clark State College	Springfield	Public	Associate's college	5,077	1962
Cleveland Institute of Art	Cleveland	Private not-for profit	Special-focus institution	545	1882
Cleveland Institute of Music	Cleveland	Private not-for profit	Special-focus institution	293	1920
Cleveland State University	Cleveland	Public	Doctoral/higher research university	14,074	1964
Columbus College of Art and Design	Columbus	Private not-for profit	Special-focus institution	916	1879
Columbus State Community College	Columbus	Public	Associate's college	28,081	1963
Cuyahoga Community College	Cleveland	Public	Associate's college	17,840	1963
Defiance College	Defiance	Private not-for profit	Baccalaureate college	568	1850
Denison University	Granville	Private not-for profit	Baccalaureate college	2,394	1831
East Ohio College	East Liverpool	Private for profit	Associate's college	118	1886
Edison State Community College	Piqua	Public	Associate's college	4,624	1973
Franciscan University of Steubenville	Steubenville	Private (Catholic) not-for profit	Master's university	3,976	1946
Franklin University	Columbus	Private not-for profit	Special-focus institution	9,457	1902
Heidelberg University	Tiffin	Private not-for profit	Master's university	1,091	1850
Hiram College	Hiram	Private not-for profit	Baccalaureate college	1,061	1850
Hocking College	Nelsonville	Public	Associate's college	1,486	1968
Hondros College of Nursing	Columbus	Private not-for profit	Associate's college	3,857	1981
James A. Rhodes State College	Lima	Public	Associate's college	4,124	1971
John Carroll University	University Heights	Private (Catholic) not-for profit	Master's university	2,864	1886
Kent State University	Kent	Public	Doctoral/highest research university	40,962	1910
Kenyon College	Gambier	Private not-for profit	Baccalaureate college	2,249	1824
Kettering College	Kettering	Private not-for profit	Special-focus institution	757	1967
Lake Erie College	Painesville	Private not-for profit	Master's university	1,108	1856
Lakeland Community College	Kirtland and Madison	Public	Associate's college	4,358	1967
Lorain County Community College	Elyria, Wellington, North Ridgeville, and Lorain	Public	Associate's college	9,350	1963
Malone University	Canton	Private not-for profit	Master's university	1,256	1892
Marietta College	Marietta	Private not-for profit	Baccalaureate college	1,109	1835
Marion Technical College	Marion	Public	Associate's college	3,346	1970
Mercy College of Ohio	Toledo	Private (Catholic) not-for profit	Special-focus institution	1,096	1917
Mount Carmel College of Nursing	Columbus	Private not-for profit	Special-focus institution	670	1903
Miami University	Oxford	Public	Doctoral/higher research university	22,508	1809
Mount St. Joseph University	Cincinnati	Private (Catholic) not-for profit	Master's university	2,265	1920
Mount Vernon Nazarene University	Mount Vernon	Private not-for profit	Master's university	1,671	1968
Muskingum University	New Concord	Private not-for profit	Master's university	1,751	1837
North Central State College	Mansfield	Public	Associate's college	2,553	1961
Northeast Ohio Medical University	Rootstown	Public	Doctoral/M.D./Pharm.D./higher research university	1,029	1972
Northwest State Community College	Archbold	Public	Associate's college	4,082	1968
Oberlin College	Oberlin	Private not-for profit	Baccalaureate college	2,909	1833
Ohio University	Athens	Public	Doctoral/highest research university	35,580	1804
Ohio Christian University	Circleville	Private not-for profit	Baccalaureate college	1,431	1947
Ohio Dominican University	Columbus	Private (Catholic) not-for profit	Master's university	1,209	1911
Ohio Northern University	Ada	Private not-for profit	Baccalaureate college	3,140	1871
Ohio State University	Columbus	Public	Doctoral/highest research university	66,408	1870
Ohio Technical College	Cleveland	Private for-profit	Associate's college	683	1969
Ohio Wesleyan University	Delaware	Private not-for profit	Baccalaureate college	1,525	1842
Otterbein University	Westerville	Private not-for profit	Master's university	2,332	1847
Owens Community College	Toledo and Findlay	Public	Associate's college	7,854	1965
Payne Theological Seminary	Wilberforce	Private not-for profit	Special Focus Four-Year: Faith-Related Institutions	124	1894
Pontifical College Josephinum	Columbus	Private (Catholic) not-for profit	Special-focus institution	88	1888
Remington College	Cleveland	Private not-for profit	Special-focus institution	197	1987
Shawnee State University	Portsmouth	Public	Baccalaureate college	3,231	1986
Sinclair Community College	Dayton	Public	Associate's college	19,415	1887
Southern State Community College	Hillsboro, Mount Orab, Wilmington, and Washington Court House	Public	Associate's college	2,227	1971
Stark State College	Canton	Public	Associate's college	10,128	1960
Stautzenberger College	Maumee and Brecksvillle	Private for profit	Junior college: two-year vocational/technical institution	695	1926
Terra State Community College	Fremont	Public	Associate's college	2,214	1968
Tiffin University	Tiffin	Private not-for profit	Master's university	3,831	1888
United Theological Seminary	Dayton	Private (Methodist) not-for profit	Special Focus Four-Year: Faith-Related Institutions	510	1871
University of Akron Main Campus	Akron	Public	Doctoral Universities: High Research Activity	13,332	1870
University of Akron Wayne College	Orrville	Public	Associate's Colleges: High Transfer-High Nontraditional	1,411	1972
University of Cincinnati	Cincinnati	Public	Doctoral/highest research university	62,292	1819
University of Dayton	Dayton	Private (Catholic) not-for profit	Doctoral/higher research university	10,506	1850
University of Findlay	Findlay	Private not-for profit	Master's university	5,016	1882
University of Mount Union	Alliance	Private not-for profit	Baccalaureate college	2,461	1846
University of Northwestern Ohio	Lima	Private not-for profit	Mixed baccalaureate/associate's college	2,525	1920
University of Rio Grande	Rio Grande	Private not-for profit	Mixed baccalaureate/associate's college	2,258	1876
University of Toledo	Toledo	Public	Doctoral/higher research university	14,358	1872
Walsh University	North Canton	Private (Catholic) not-for profit	Master's university	2,192	1958
Washington State Community College	Marietta	Public	Associate's college	2,025	1971
Wilberforce University	Wilberforce	Private not-for profit	Baccalaureate college, HBCU	838	1856
Wilmington College	Wilmington	Private not-for profit	Master's university	1,040	1870
Winebrenner Theological Seminary	Findlay	Private (Churches of God) not-for profit	Special Focus Four-Year: Faith-Related Institutions	122	1942
Wittenberg University	Springfield	Private not-for profit	Baccalaureate college	1,285	1845
The College of Wooster	Wooster	Private not-for profit	Baccalaureate college	1,738	1866
Wright State University	Fairborn	Public	Doctoral/higher research university	11,959	1967
Xavier University	Cincinnati	Private (Catholic) not-for profit	Master's university	5,501	1831
Youngstown State University	Youngstown	Public	Master's university	12,204	1908
Zane State College	Zanesville	Public	Associate's college	1,769	1969

== Defunct institutions ==
Defunct institutions
School	Location	Control	Founded	Closed	Ref
Chancellor University	Cleveland	Private for-profit	1848	2013	
Chatfield College	St. Martin	Private (Catholic) not-for profit	1971	2023	
Cincinnati Christian University	Cincinnati	Private not-for profit	1924	2019	
Cleveland Institute of Electronics	Cleveland	Private for-profit	1934	2022	
Daymar College	Various	Private for-profit associate's college	1963	2018	
Eastern Gateway Community College	Steubenville and Youngstown	Public associate's college	1986	2024	
Edgecliff College	Cincinnati	Private (Catholic) not-for profit	1935	1980; Merged into Xavier University	
Lourdes University	Sylvania	Private (Catholic) not-for profit	1958	2026	
Mary Manse College	Toledo	Private (Catholic) not-for profit	1922	1975	
Miami-Jacobs Career College	Various	Private for-profit	1916	2018	
Miami Valley College	Springboro	Private	1870	1883	
Modern College of Design	Kettering	Private for-profit	1983	2026	
National Normal University	Lebanon	Private	1855	1917; Merged into Wilmington College	
Notre Dame College	South Euclid	Private (Catholic) not-for profit	1922	2024	
Ohio Central College	Iberia	Private	1854	Unspecified	
Trinity Lutheran Seminary	Columbus	Private not-for profit	1830	2018; Merged into Capital University	
Union Institute & University	Cincinnati	Private not-for profit	1964	2024	
Urbana University	Urbana	Private not-for profit	1850	2020; Merged into Franklin University	
Ursuline College	Pepper Pike	Private (Catholic) not-for profit	1871	2026	
Western College for Women	Oxford	Private	1855	1974; Merged into Miami University	

== See also ==
- Higher education in the United States
- List of American institutions of higher education
- List of college athletic programs in Ohio
- List of recognized higher education accreditation organizations
- Lists of universities and colleges
- List of colleges and universities by country
