= List of college athletic programs in Ohio =

College athletic programs in Ohio, U.S.A

This is a list of college athletic programs in the U.S. state of Ohio.

== NCAA ==
=== Division I ===
Full NCAA Division I member colleges in Ohio.
- FBS Football, - FCS Football, - Non-football

Team	School	City	Conference	Sport sponsorship								
Team	School	City	Conference	Football	Basketball		Baseball	Softball	Ice hockey		Soccer	
Team	School	City	Conference	Football	M	W	Baseball	Softball	M	W	M	W
Akron Zips	University of Akron	Akron	Mid-American	FBS	Yes	Yes	Yes	Yes	No	No	Yes (Note: Akron's men's soccer team competes in the Big East Conference.)	Yes
Bowling Green Falcons	Bowling Green State University	Bowling Green	Mid-American	FBS	Yes	Yes	Yes	Yes	Yes (Note: Bowling Green's men's ice hockey team competes in the Central Collegiate Hockey Association.)	No	Yes (Note: Bowling Green's men's soccer team competes in the Missouri Valley Conference.)	Yes
Cincinnati Bearcats	University of Cincinnati	Cincinnati	Big 12	FBS	Yes	Yes	Yes	No	No	No	No	Yes
Cleveland State Vikings	Cleveland State University	Cleveland	Horizon	No	Yes	Yes	No	No	No	No	Yes	Yes
Dayton Flyers	University of Dayton	Dayton	Atlantic 10	FCS (Note: Dayton's football team competes in the Pioneer Football League.)	Yes	Yes	Yes	Yes	No	No	Yes	Yes
Kent State Golden Flashes	Kent State University	Kent	Mid-American	FBS	Yes	Yes	Yes	Yes	No	No	No	Yes
Miami RedHawks	Miami University	Oxford	Mid-American	FBS	Yes	Yes	Yes	Yes	Yes (Note: Miami's men's ice hockey team competes in the National Collegiate Hockey Conference.)	No	No	Yes
Ohio Bobcats	Ohio University	Athens	Mid-American	FBS	Yes	Yes	Yes	Yes	No	No	No	Yes
Ohio State Buckeyes	Ohio State University	Columbus	Big Ten	FBS	Yes	Yes	Yes	Yes	Yes	Yes (Note: Ohio State's women's ice hockey team competes in the Western Collegiate Hockey Association.)	Yes	Yes
Toledo Rockets	University of Toledo	Toledo	Mid-American	FBS	Yes	Yes	Yes	Yes	No	No	No	Yes
Wright State Raiders	Wright State University	Fairborn (Note: Wright State is located within the city limits of Fairborn, but has a Dayton mailing address.)	Horizon	No	Yes	Yes	Yes	No	No	No	Yes	Yes
Xavier Musketeers	Xavier University	Cincinnati	Big East	No	Yes	Yes	Yes	No	No	No	Yes	Yes
Youngstown State Penguins	Youngstown State University	Youngstown	Horizon	FCS (Note: Youngstown State's football team competes in the Missouri Valley Football Conference.)	Yes	Yes	Yes	Yes	No	No	No	Yes

=== Division II ===
Full NCAA Division II member colleges in Ohio.
- Football, - Non-football

Team	School	City	Conference	Sport sponsorship						
Team	School	City	Conference	Football	Basketball		Baseball	Softball	Soccer	
Team	School	City	Conference	Football	M	W	Baseball	Softball	M	W
Ashland Eagles	Ashland University	Ashland	Great Midwest	Yes	Yes	Yes	Yes	Yes	Yes	Yes
Cedarville Yellow Jackets	Cedarville University	Cedarville	Great Midwest	No	Yes	Yes	Yes	Yes	Yes	Yes
Central State Marauders	Central State University	Wilberforce	SIAC	Yes	Yes	Yes	No	No	No	No
Findlay Oilers	University of Findlay	Findlay	Great Midwest	Yes	Yes	Yes	Yes	Yes	Yes	Yes
Lake Erie Storm	Lake Erie College	Painesville	Great Midwest	Yes	Yes	Yes	Yes	Yes	Yes	Yes
Malone Pioneers	Malone University	Canton	Great Midwest	No	Yes	Yes	Yes	Yes	Yes	Yes
Ohio Dominican Panthers	Ohio Dominican University	Columbus	Great Midwest	Yes	Yes	Yes	Yes	Yes	Yes	Yes
Shawnee State Bears	Shawnee State University	Portsmouth	Mountain East	No	Yes	Yes	Yes	Yes	Yes	Yes
Tiffin Dragons	Tiffin University	Tiffin	Great Midwest	Yes	Yes	Yes	Yes	Yes	Yes	Yes
Ursuline Arrows	Ursuline College	Pepper Pike	Great Midwest	No	No	Yes	No	Yes	No	Yes
Walsh Cavaliers	Walsh University	North Canton	Great Midwest	Yes (Note: Walsh additionally fields a team in sprint football, a weight-restricted form of football not governed by the NCAA, as a member of the Midwest Sprint Football League.)	Yes	Yes	Yes	Yes	Yes	Yes

=== Division III ===
Full NCAA Division III member colleges in Ohio.
- Football, - Non-football

Team	School	City	Conference	Sport sponsorship						
Team	School	City	Conference	Football	Basketball		Baseball	Softball	Soccer	
Team	School	City	Conference	Football	M	W	Baseball	Softball	M	W
Baldwin Wallace Yellow Jackets	Baldwin Wallace University	Berea	Ohio	Yes	Yes	Yes	Yes	Yes	Yes	Yes
Bluffton Beavers	Bluffton University	Bluffton	HCAC	Yes	Yes	Yes	Yes	Yes	Yes	Yes
Capital Comets	Capital University	Bexley	Ohio	Yes	Yes	Yes	Yes	Yes	Yes	Yes
Case Western Reserve Spartans	Case Western Reserve University	Cleveland	UAA	Yes (Note: Case Western Reserve's football team competes in the Presidents' Athletic Conference.)	Yes	Yes	Yes	Yes	Yes	Yes
Denison Big Red	Denison University	Granville	North Coast	Yes	Yes	Yes	Yes	Yes	Yes	Yes
Franciscan Barons	Franciscan University of Steubenville	Steubenville	Presidents'	No	Yes	Yes	Yes	Yes	Yes	Yes
Heidelberg Student Princes	Heidelberg University	Tiffin	Ohio	Yes	Yes	Yes	Yes	Yes	Yes	Yes
Hiram Terriers	Hiram College	Hiram	Presidents'	Yes	Yes	Yes	Yes	Yes	Yes	Yes
John Carroll Blue Streaks	John Carroll University	University Heights	North Coast	Yes	Yes	Yes	Yes	Yes	Yes	Yes
Kenyon Owls	Kenyon College	Gambier	North Coast	Yes	Yes	Yes	Yes	Yes	Yes	Yes
Marietta Pioneers	Marietta College	Marietta	Ohio	Yes	Yes	Yes	Yes	Yes	Yes	Yes
Mount Union Purple Raiders	University of Mount Union	Alliance	Ohio	Yes	Yes	Yes	Yes	Yes	Yes	Yes
Mount St. Joseph Lions	Mount St. Joseph University	Cincinnati	HCAC	Yes	Yes	Yes	Yes	Yes	Yes	Yes
Muskingum Fighting Muskies	Muskingum University	New Concord	Ohio	Yes	Yes	Yes	Yes	Yes	Yes	Yes
Oberlin Yeomen	Oberlin College	Oberlin	North Coast	Yes	Yes	Yes	Yes	Yes	Yes	Yes
Ohio Northern Polar Bears	Ohio Northern University	Ada	Ohio	Yes	Yes	Yes	Yes	Yes	Yes	Yes
Ohio Wesleyan Battling Bishops	Ohio Wesleyan University	Delaware	North Coast	Yes	Yes	Yes	Yes	Yes	Yes	Yes
Otterbein Cardinals	Otterbein University	Westerville	Ohio	Yes	Yes	Yes	Yes	Yes	Yes	Yes
Wilmington Quakers	Wilmington College	Wilmington	Ohio	Yes	Yes	Yes	Yes	Yes	Yes	Yes
Wittenberg Tigers	Wittenberg University	Springfield	North Coast	Yes	Yes	Yes	Yes	Yes	Yes	Yes
Wooster Fighting Scots	College of Wooster	Wooster	North Coast	Yes	Yes	Yes	Yes	Yes	Yes	Yes

== NAIA ==
Full NAIA member colleges in Ohio.
- Football, - Non-football

Team	School	City	Conference	Sport sponsorship						
Team	School	City	Conference	Football	Basketball		Baseball	Softball	Soccer	
Team	School	City	Conference	Football	M	W	Baseball	Softball	M	W
Defiance Yellow Jackets	Defiance College	Defiance	Wolverine–Hoosier	Yes	Yes	Yes	Yes	Yes	Yes	Yes
Lourdes Gray Wolves	Lourdes University	Sylvania	Wolverine–Hoosier	No	Yes	Yes	Yes	Yes	Yes	Yes
Mount Vernon Nazarene Cougars	Mount Vernon Nazarene University	Mount Vernon	Crossroads	No	Yes	Yes	Yes	Yes	Yes	Yes
Northwestern Ohio Racers	University of Northwestern Ohio	Lima	Wolverine–Hoosier	No	Yes	Yes	Yes	Yes	Yes	Yes
Ohio Christian Trailblazers	Ohio Christian University	Circleville	River States	No	Yes	Yes	Yes	Yes	Yes	Yes
Rio Grande RedStorm	University of Rio Grande	Rio Grande	River States	Yes	Yes	Yes	Yes	Yes	Yes	Yes
Wilberforce Bulldogs	Wilberforce University	Wilberforce	Mid-South	No	Yes	Yes	Yes	No	No	No

== NJCAA ==
Full NJCAA member colleges in Ohio.
- Football, - Non-football

Team	School	City	Conference
Bryant & Stratton Bobcats	Bryant & Stratton College	Solon	Ohio CC
Clark State Eagles	Clark State Community College	Springfield	Ohio CC
Cuyahoga Triceratops (formerly Challengers)	Cuyahoga Community College	Cleveland	Ohio CC
Edison Chargers	Edison Community College	Piqua	Ohio CC
Hocking Hawks	Hocking College	Nelsonville	Ohio CC
Lakeland Lakers	Lakeland Community College	Kirtland	Ohio CC
Lorain County Commodores	Lorain County Community College	Elyria	Ohio CC
Owens Express	Owens Community College	Toledo	Ohio CC
Terra State Titans	Terra State Community College	Fremont	Ohio CC

== Ohio Regional Campus Conference ==
Team	School	City
Miami-Hamilton Harriers	Miami University Hamilton (Note: Also holds USCAA membership.)	Hamilton
Miami-Middletown ThunderHawks	Miami University Middletown	Middletown
Ohio University-Lancaster Cougars	Ohio University Lancaster	Lancaster

== USCAA ==
Team	School	City	Conference
Bryant & Stratton Bobcats	Bryant & Stratton College	Solon	Independent
Cincinnati-Clermont Cougars	University of Cincinnati Clermont College	Batavia	Independent
Kent State Tuscarawas Golden Eagles	Kent State University at Tuscarawas	New Philadelphia	Independent
Wright State-Lake Lakers	Wright State University Lake Campus	Celina	Independent

== See also ==
- List of NCAA Division I institutions
- List of NCAA Division II institutions
- List of NCAA Division III institutions
- List of NAIA institutions
- List of USCAA institutions
- List of NCCAA institutions
- List of NJCAA Division I institutions
- List of NJCAA Division II institutions
- List of NJCAA Division III institutions
