= Ohio Community College Athletic Conference =

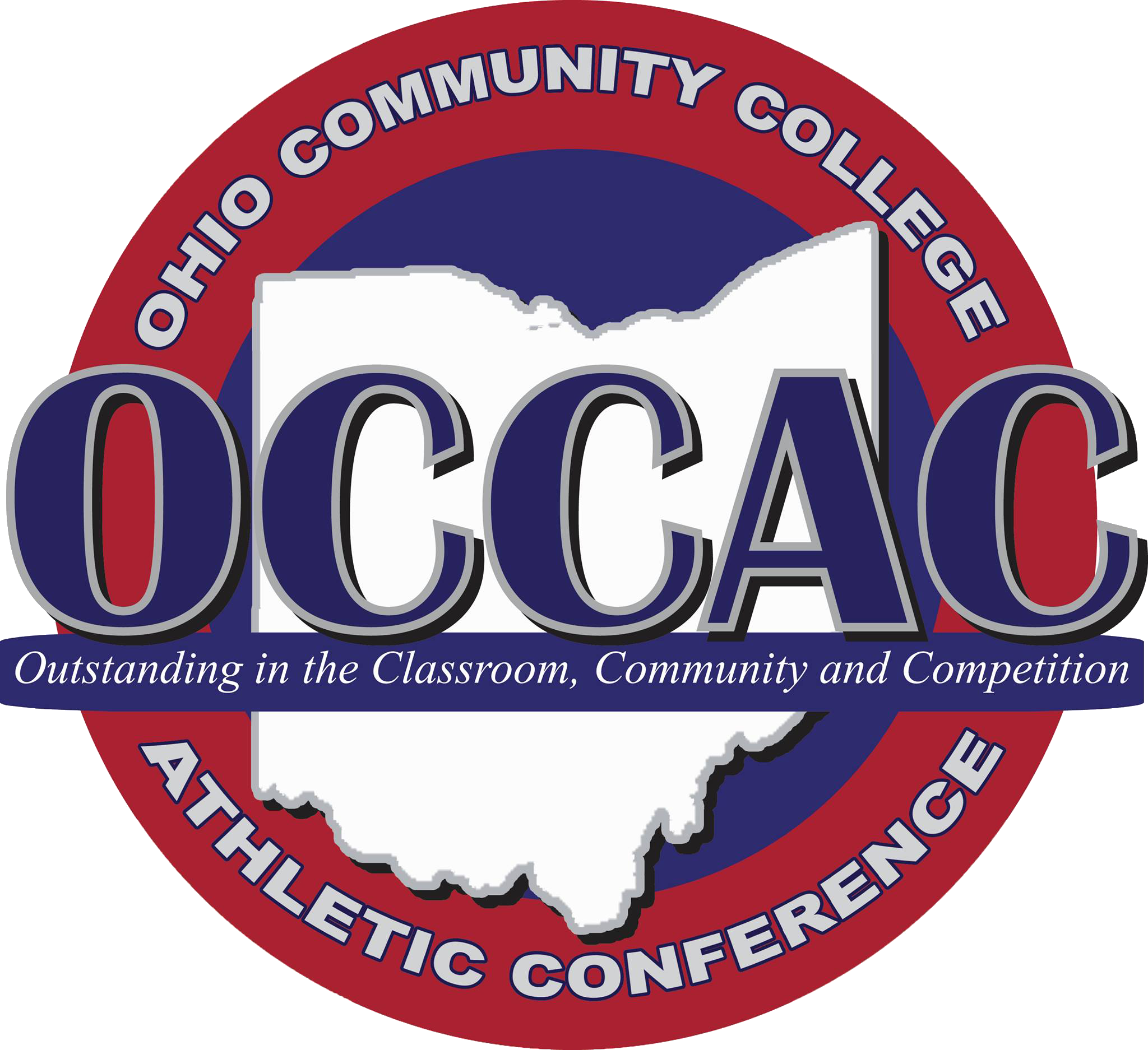
- Association: NJCAA
- Founded: 1972; 54 years ago
- Commissioner: Scott Barlow
- Sports fielded: 6; men's: 3; women's: 3
- Division: Region 12
- No. of teams: 9
- Headquarters: Dayton, Ohio
- Region: Ohio
- Website: occac.org

The Ohio Community College Athletic Conference (OCCAC) is a college athletic conference whose member institutions are community colleges in the state of Ohio. It is a member of Region 12 of the National Junior College Athletic Association (NJCAA).

== History ==
The OCCAC has been around since 1993 in its current state. Prior to 1993, the OCCAC was known as the Ohio Junior College Athletic Conference (OJCAC) and the Turnpike Conference. Currently, the OCCAC has full sport members from 9 community colleges in Ohio.

== Sports sponsored ==
Current sports with full conference membership (at least four schools participating) include, women's volleyball, men's basketball, women's basketball, men's soccer (conference resumed sponsorship in 2024), softball and baseball. Several schools also compete in non-conference sports such as women's soccer, track and field, men's golf, women's golf and cross country. The conference's sponsorship of men's golf ended after 2016.

== Member schools ==
=== Current members ===
The OCCAC currently has 9 full members, all but one are public schools:

Institution	Location	Founded	Affiliation	Enrollment	Nickname	Joined	Colors
Bryant & Stratton College–Ohio Campus	Solon, Ohio	1854	Private Non-Profit	8,000	Bobcats	?	
Clark State Community College	Springfield, Ohio	1966	Public (Note: Part of the University System of Ohio.)	6,229	Eagles	?	
Cuyahoga Community College (East, Metro and West)	Cleveland, Ohio	1963	Public	26,740	Triceratops (Note: Former nickname was Challengers.)	?	
Edison State Community College	Piqua, Ohio	1973	Public	4,351	Chargers	?	
Hocking College	Nelsonville, Ohio	1968	Public	3,671	Hawks	?	
Lakeland Community College	Kirtland, Ohio	1967	Public	8,034	Lakers	?	
Lorain County Community College	Elyria, Ohio	1963	Public	11,548	Commodores	?	
Owens Community College	Toledo, Ohio	1965	Public	8,282	Express	?	
Terra State Community College	Fremont, Ohio	1968	Public	2,434	Titans	?	

=== Former members ===
The OCCAC has had four former full members, three of which were public schools:

Institution	Location	Founded	Affiliation	Enrollment	Nickname	Joined	Left	Colors	Current conference
Cincinnati State Technical and Community College	Cincinnati, Ohio	1966	Public (Note: Part of the University System of Ohio.)	9,400	Surge	?	2017 (Note: Cincinnati State eliminated all sports except men's and women's soccer after the 2016–17 season.)		suspended athletics (Note: Athletic program has been suspended since the COVID-19 pandemic.)
Columbus State Community College	Columbus, Ohio	1963	Public	26,900	Cougars	?	2020		suspended athletics
Mercyhurst North East	North East, Pennsylvania	1991	Catholic	N/A	Saints	?	2021		N/A (Note: Campus consolidated with the main Mercyhurst school in 2021.)
Sinclair Community College	Dayton, Ohio	1887	Public	18,772	Tartan Pride	?	2020		suspended athletics

=== Former affiliate members ===
The OCCAC currently had two affiliate members, both were public schools:

Institution	Location	Founded	Affiliation	Enrollment	Nickname	Joined	Left	Colors	OCCAC sport(s)	Current conference
Eastern Gateway Community College	Steubenville, Ohio	1968	Public (Note: Part of the University System of Ohio.)	N/A	Gators	?	2019		baseball	N/A (Note: School closed in 2024.)
Ivy Tech Community College	Fort Wayne, Indiana	1973	Public	89,705	Titans	?	2022		volleyball	discontinued athletics

=== Sponsored sports by school ===
School	Baseball	Basketball (men's)	Basketball (women's)	Softball	Volleyball (women's)	Soccer (men's)	Total Men's Sports	Total Women's Sports	Total Sports
Bryant & Stratton	✓	✓	✓	✗	✗	✗	2	1	3
Clark State	✓	✓	✓	✗	✓	✗	2	2	4
Cuyahoga	✓	✓	✓	✓	✓	✓	3	3	6
Edison State	✓	✓	✓	✓	✓	✗	2	3	5
Hocking	✓	✓	✓	✓	✗	✗	2	2	4
Lakeland	✓	✓	✓	✓	✓	✓	3	3	6
Lorain County	✓	✓	✓	✗	✓	✗	3	2	5
Owens	✓	✓	✓	✓	✓	✓	3	3	6
Terra State	✓	✓	✓	✓	✓	✓	3	3	6
Totals	9	9	8	6	9	4	23	22	45

== See also ==
- Michigan Community College Athletic Association, also in NJCAA Region 12
