= University System of Ohio =

Public university system in Ohio

- Type: Public university system
- Established: 2007; 19 years ago
- Endowment: $13 billion
- Chancellor: Mike Duffey
- Academic staff: 34,262 (Fall 2023)
- Total staff: 106,805 (Fall 2023)
- Students: 444,368 (Fall 2024)
- Location: Columbus, Ohio, United States
- Website: highered.ohio.gov

The University System of Ohio is the public university system of the U.S. state of Ohio. It is governed by the Ohio Department of Higher Education.

Unlike other state university systems, such as the University of California system, Ohio's university system does not utilize a system of naming conventions for its colleges and universities.

The system includes all of Ohio's public institutions of higher education: 14 four-year research universities, 24 branch and regional campuses, 23 community colleges and technical colleges, and 13 graduate schools, seven medical schools, six law schools, and ten business schools within campuses. Additionally, some campuses offer Adult Workforce Education (AWE) and Adult Basic and Literacy Education (ABLE) programs. The AWE and ABLE programs were transferred from the Ohio Department of Education to the Ohio Board of Regents in 2009 to provide a flexible system of higher education that will improve services while reducing costs to students. The total annual enrollment of University System of Ohio institutions was over 526,003 as of 2020.

== History ==
The University System of Ohio was unified under Governor Ted Strickland in 2007. In 2008, Chancellor Eric Fingerhut proposed creating common academic calendars for all of the system's universities: the goal was to simplify transfer between institutions and allow students to be recruited at the same time for jobs and internships. After spending more than $26 million starting in 2008, the transition was completed by the 2012 academic year.

== Colleges and universities ==
University System of Ohio main campuses

=== University main campuses ===
Campus	Location	Classification	Founded	Enrollment	Endowment	Athletics		
Campus	Location	Classification	Founded	Enrollment	Endowment	Affiliation	Conference	Nickname
Bowling Green State University	Bowling Green	Doctoral	1910	17,597	$259 million	NCAA Division I	Mid-American	Falcons
Central State University	Wilberforce	Baccalaureate	1887	1,839	$2 million	NCAA Division II	Southern Intercollegiate	Marauders
Cleveland State University	Cleveland	Doctoral	1964	14,037	$88.9 million	NCAA Division I	Horizon	Vikings
Kent State University	Kent	Doctoral	1910	25,530	$301 million	NCAA Division I	Mid-American	Golden Flashes
Miami University	Oxford	Doctoral	1809	18,838	$716 million	NCAA Division I	Mid-American	RedHawks
Northeast Ohio Medical University	Rootstown	Special Focus	1973	1,026	$22.8 million	None		Walking Whales
Ohio University	Athens	Doctoral	1804	25,767	$879 million	NCAA Division I	Mid-American	Bobcats
Ohio State University	Columbus	Doctoral	1870	61,443	$7.9 billion	NCAA Division I	Big Ten	Buckeyes
Shawnee State University	Portsmouth	Master's	1986	3,236	$19 million	NCAA Division II	Mountain East	Bears
University of Akron	Akron	Doctoral	1870	13,356	$221 million	NCAA Division I	Mid-American	Zips
University of Cincinnati	Cincinnati	Doctoral	1819	45,584	$2 billion	NCAA Division I	Big 12	Bearcats
University of Toledo	Toledo	Doctoral	1872	14,440	$455 million	NCAA Division I	Mid-American	Rockets
Wright State University	Fairborn (Note: The campus mailing address is Dayton.)	Doctoral	1967	10,588	$93 million	NCAA Division I	Horizon	Raiders
Youngstown State University	Youngstown	Master's	1908	12,164	$265 million	NCAA Division I	Horizon	Penguins

=== University regional campuses ===
Central State, Cleveland State, NEOMED, Shawnee State, Toledo, and Youngstown State do not have regional campuses, although Youngstown State is in the process of launching a satellite campus in Steubenville, Ohio due to financial difficulties with Eastern Gateway Community College, the latter of which shut down in 2024.

- Bowling Green State University
  - Bowling Green State University Firelands
- Kent State University
  - Kent State University at Ashtabula
  - Kent State University at East Liverpool
  - Kent State University at Geauga
  - Kent State University at Salem
  - Kent State University at Stark
  - Kent State University at Trumbull
  - Kent State University at Tuscarawas
- Miami University
  - Miami University Hamilton
  - Miami University Middletown
  - Miami University Voice of America Learning Center
- Ohio University
  - Ohio University Chillicothe
  - Ohio University Eastern
  - Ohio University Lancaster
  - Ohio University Southern
  - Ohio University Zanesville
- Ohio State University
  - Ohio State University Agricultural Technical Institute
  - Ohio State University at Lima
  - Ohio State University at Mansfield
  - Ohio State University at Marion
  - Ohio State University at Newark
- University of Akron
  - Medina County University Center
  - University of Akron Wayne College
  - University of Akron Lakewood
- University of Cincinnati
  - University of Cincinnati Blue Ash College
  - University of Cincinnati Clermont College
- Wright State University
  - Wright State University Lake Campus

=== Community and technical colleges ===
- Belmont College - St. Clairsville and Cadiz
- Central Ohio Technical College - Newark
- Cincinnati State Technical and Community College - Cincinnati
- Clark State College - Springfield, Beavercreek, and Bellefontaine
- Columbus State Community College - Columbus
- Cuyahoga Community College - Cleveland
- Edison State Community College - Piqua
- Hocking College - Nelsonville
- Lakeland Community College - Kirtland
- Lorain County Community College - Elyria
- Marion Technical College - Marion
- North Central State College - Mansfield
- Northwest State Community College - Archbold
- Owens Community College - Toledo and Findlay
- Rhodes State College - Lima
- Rio Grande Community College (See University of Rio Grande) - Rio Grande
- Sinclair Community College - Dayton and Mason
- Southern State Community College - Hillsboro and Mount Orab
- Stark State College - North Canton, Akron
- Terra State Community College - Fremont
- Washington State College of Ohio - Marietta
- Zane State College - Zanesville

== See also ==
- Education in Ohio
