= Clark College (disambiguation) =

Clark College is a community college in Vancouver, Washington, United States.

Clark College may also refer to:

- Clark Atlanta University, in Atlanta, Georgia, United States, which was formed in 1988 by the merger of Clark College and Atlanta University
- Clark State Community College, in Springfield, Ohio, United States
- Clark University, in Worcester, Massachusetts, United States

== See also ==
- Clarke College (disambiguation)
- Lewis & Clark College, a liberal arts college in Portland, Oregon
