= University of Ohio =

University of Ohio may refer to:

- Ohio University
- Ohio State University
- University System of Ohio
