= Edison State College (disambiguation) =

Edison State College, now Florida SouthWestern State College, is a college in Fort Myers, Florida.

Edison State College may also refer to:

- Thomas Edison State College in Trenton, New Jersey
- Edison State Community College in Piqua, Ohio
