= Clarke College =

Clarke College may refer to:

- Clarke College, the former name of Clarke University, in Dubuque, Iowa, U.S.
- Clarke College, in 1992 merged into Mississippi College, in Clinton, Mississippi, U.S.
- William Clarke College, in Sydney, New South Wales, Australia

== See also ==
- Clark College (disambiguation)
