= North Central State College =

Community college in Mansfield, Ohio, U.S.

Coordinates: 40.798611°N 82.581667°W

- Type: Public community college
- Established: 1961; 65 years ago
- Parent institution: University System of Ohio
- Students: 3,094
- Location: Mansfield, Ohio, United States
- Colors
- Website: ncstatecollege.edu

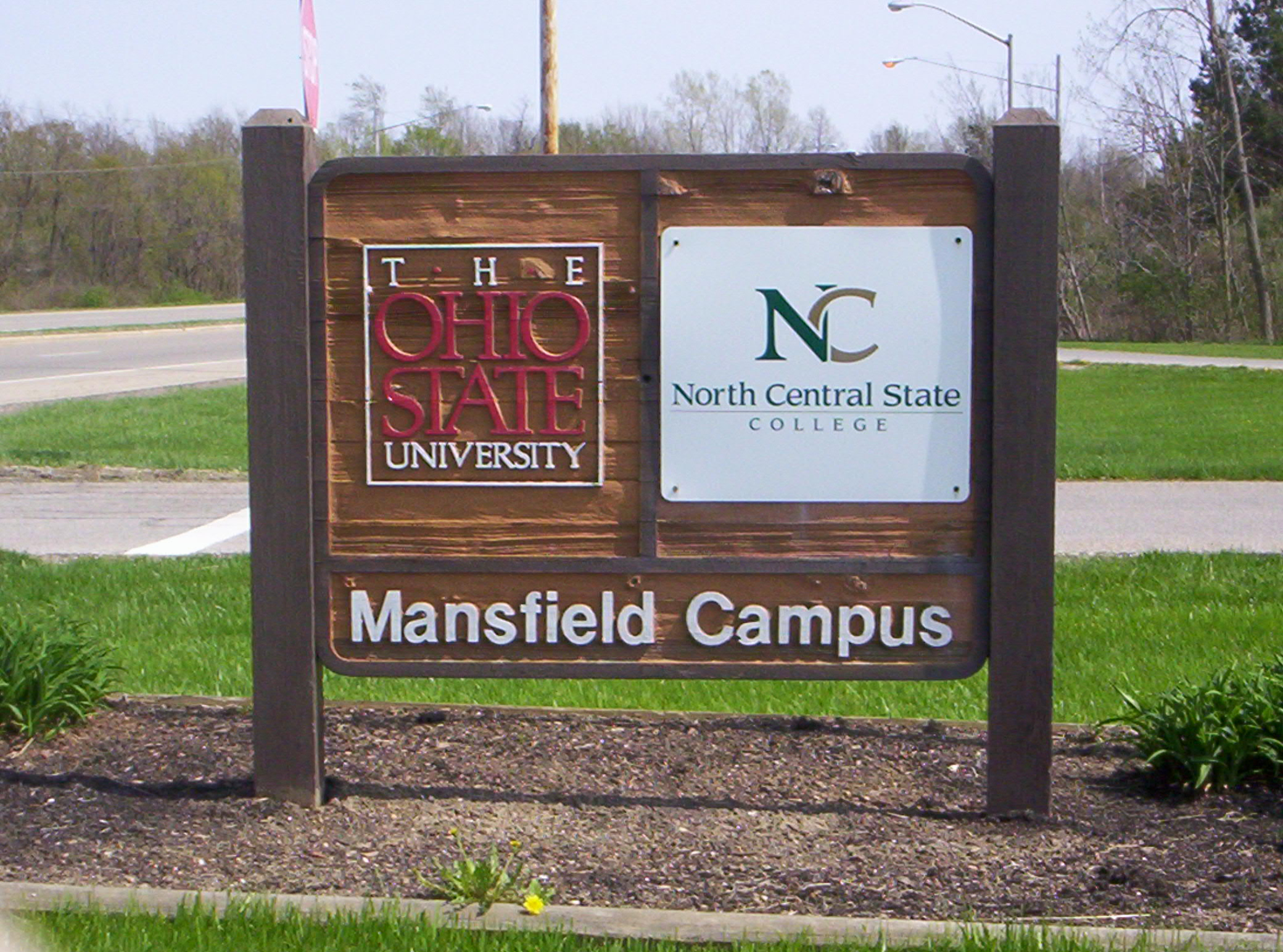
Mansfield Campus welcome sign

North Central State College is a public community college in Mansfield, Ohio, United States. It is located on the 644-acre (261 ha) campus of The Ohio State University at Mansfield. NCSC offers associate degrees and certification programs in a number of career fields, including business, computers, engineering, health science and public service, technology, and workforce development.

== History ==
In 1961, the Mansfield Board of Education established Mansfield School of Technology, the predecessor of North Central State College. This institution's primary purpose was to provide local residents with technical training so that they could advance in the workplace or secure better careers. In 1968, the Ohio Board of Regents authorized Mansfield School of Technology to become North Central Technical College. This new institution expanded its programs beyond Mansfield to include residents of Ashland, Crawford, and Richland Counties. As the college continued to grow and offered a wider array of courses, the institution became known, in 1999, as North Central State College. In 2005, North Central State College offered nearly thirty associate degree and thirty certificate degree programs. NCSC also has articulation agreements with a number of four-year institutions in Ohio for students who wish to transfer and continue their education without the loss of credits earned.

== Campus ==
North Central State College's main campus in Mansfield is 644 acres (261 ha), shared with The Ohio State University at Mansfield. The college also has two satellite centers: the Kehoe Center in Shelby, and the Crawford Success Center in Bucyrus.
