= Central Ohio Technical College =

Public two-year college based in Newark, Ohio, US

Coordinates: 40°04′04″N 82°26′49″W

- Type: Public technical college
- Established: 1971; 55 years ago
- Parent institution: University System of Ohio
- Endowment: $5.84 million (2025)
- President: John M. Berry, Ph.D
- Students: 3,491 full and part time (Fall 2017) (all campuses)
- Location: Newark, Ohio, United States
- Campus: 155 acres (0.63 km^{2}) (Newark campus),
- Colors: Blue, White
- Website: www.cotc.edu

Central Ohio Technical College (COTC) is a public technical college in Newark, Ohio, United States, with extended campuses in Pataskala, Knox, and Coshocton. Founded in 1971, COTC shares a campus with Ohio State University at Newark and offers 31 associate degree programs and 12 certificate programs, including the Associate of Applied Science, Associate of Applied Business, and Associate of Technical Studies egrees.

== Campuses ==
Six buildings make up COTC's Newark campus. These include the 81,000-square-foot (7,500 m^{2}) John and Christine Warner Library and Student Center, opened in August 2008, and the John Gilbert Reese Conference Center. The college's current enrollment on the Newark campus is approximately 2900.

COTC maintains campuses in Coshocton, Pataskala, Mount Vernon (Knox Campus) which, together, account for about one-third of the college's total enrollment.
