= Ohio State University at Newark =

Campus of Ohio State University in Newark, Ohio, U.S.

Coordinates: 40.070321°N 82.448702°W

The Ohio State University at Newark
- Type: Public satellite campus
- Established: 1957; 69 years ago
- Parent institution: Ohio State University
- Affiliations: ORCC
- President: Ravi V. Bellamkonda
- Dean: Matthew J. Smith
- Academic staff: 135
- Students: 2,572 (fall 2023)
- Undergraduates: 2,567
- Postgraduates: 5
- Location: Newark, Ohio, United States
- Campus: Suburban 155 acres
- Colors: Scarlet and Gray
- Nickname: Titans
- Website: www.newark.osu.edu

The Ohio State University at Newark is a satellite campus of Ohio State University in Newark, Ohio. During its early years, classes were held at old Newark High School. In 1966, over one million dollars pledged by 7,000 local citizens to match funds from the state legislature supported the cost of buying 155 acres (0.63 km^{2}) of land and constructing the first building, Founders Hall, which opened in 1968.

== History ==
Since Founders Hall opened, it has become home to classrooms, general administrative and faculty offices, labs, and the library. Hopewell Hall opened in 1976 and includes labs, a student lounge area, classrooms, faculty offices, the cafeteria, the bookstore, financial aid, and fees and deposits. Adena Hall was completed in 1978 and contains the gymnasium and workout facilities, classrooms, laboratories, and faculty offices. In autumn 1986, the student apartment complex opened, and in 1988 the Child Development Center was built. LeFevre Hall, opened in 1993, and is home to technical education, performing arts, and faculty offices. The Reese Center opened in October 2004 and contains classrooms, a 600-seat auditorium, a ballroom and conference center, the Cyber Café, faculty offices, labs, and the executive board room. Currently, the Ohio State Newark is the largest of the OSU regional campuses with 50 distinguished faculty members and a student body of over 2,700. The Newark campus has greatly increased its enrollment over the last decade due to the increasingly stringent admission requirements at Ohio State's main campus: since 2013, more students attend from Franklin County than Licking County.

Since 1971, the Ohio State Newark campus has partnered with Central Ohio Technical College (COTC) to share a higher education complex and to help meet the state's growing need for skilled technicians. The Newark Campus Library, now located in the Warner Center, is a cost-shared department serving the communities of Ohio State Newark and COTC. The Library houses about 50,000 print volumes, 375 serial subscriptions, over 36,000 microforms, 1000 audio tapes/CDs and video cassettes/DVDs, and 1,200 maps. In addition, as part of the Ohio State University library system and the OhioLINK consortium, the Library provides access to over 9 million unique items, including 19,000 e-books and nearly 6,000 full-text electronic journals.

The Martha Grace Amphitheatre was reopened in 1999 at Ohio State Newark. It was named after the mother of J. Gilbert Reese and the Gilbert Reese Family Foundation who donated the money to rededicate the amphitheater and make it open to the public. Because it is open to the public the Martha Grace Amphitheatre also holds weddings and other types of large events for people in the community.

== Academics ==
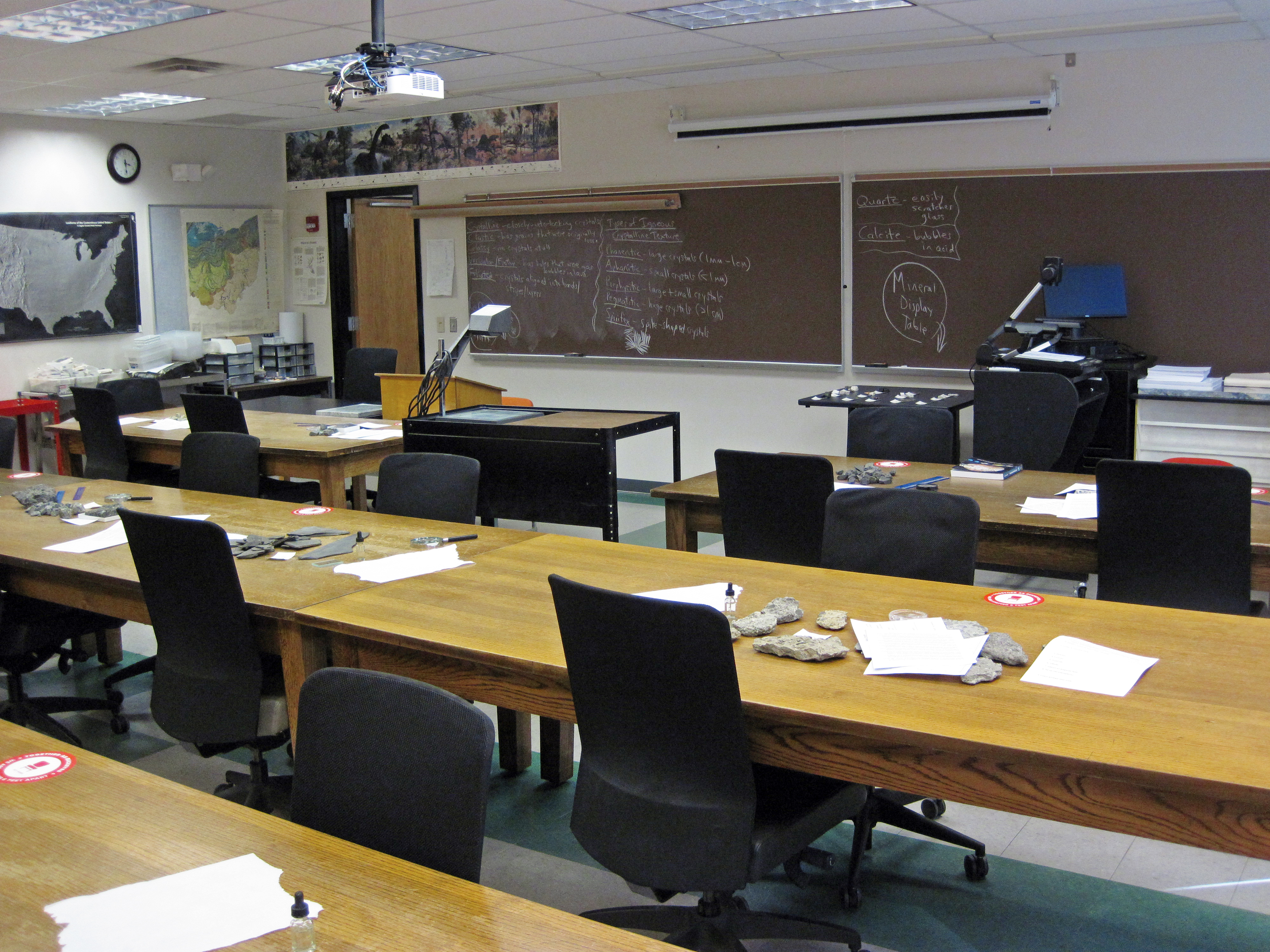
A geology classroom at Ohio State University at Newark.

Students at Ohio State Newark can complete some bachelor's degree programs and master's degrees in Newark. For other Ohio State degree programs, students can complete many of the course requirements in Newark and then transfer to the main campus in Columbus, Ohio. The Fisher College of Business gives juniors and seniors the option of taking classes online or during the evening.

== Athletics ==
Intramural sports provide an opportunity for students to participate on a team and compete with other students. Adena Hall serves as an athletic facility for campus events. The Adena Recreation Center is available for a variety of recreational activities. Adena Hall is open throughout the day and evening for recreational use by students, faculty, and staff of the Newark Campus. Participants can spend their free time enjoying basketball, volleyball, weight training, walking, and jogging. Basketball, soccer, flag football, and walking trails.

== Student life ==
The Division of Student Life operates the offices of Student Activities, Multicultural Affairs, Career Services, Disability Services, Counseling Services, University Housing, Intramurals and Recreation, and Campus Dining Services

=== Student governments ===
The Student Government of the Newark Campus was founded in 2000. It was established to work on behalf of the student population on the Newark Campus. Meeting with campus administration, hosting campus-wide events and activities, and working with faculty to help the students at OSU-Newark and COTC achieve the best college experience while on campus.

=== Student activities boards ===
The Newark Campus Activities Board coordinates and produces activities and events on campus for students, faculty, and staff. The board is made up of students from both Ohio State Newark and COTC. The Newark Residence Hall Activities Board coordinates and produces activities and events for campus students in the Residence Halls. The Student Cultural Council produces and coordinates activities and events on campus dedicated to understanding different cultures, customs, and countries around the world.
