= Ohio State University at Mansfield =

Regional university campus in Mansfield, Ohio, U.S.

The Ohio State University at Mansfield
- Type: Public satellite campus
- Established: 1958; 68 years ago
- Parent institution: Ohio State University
- President: Walter E. Carter Jr.
- Dean: Jason Opal
- Academic staff: 41
- Students: 914 (fall 2023)
- Undergraduates: 907
- Postgraduates: 7
- Location: Mansfield, Ohio, United States; 40.798889°N 82.577778°W
- Campus: Suburban 644 acres
- Colors: Scarlet and Gray
- Nickname: Buckeyes
- Sporting affiliations: ORCC
- Website: www.mansfield.osu.edu

The Ohio State University at Mansfield is a regional campus of Ohio State University in Mansfield, Ohio. It was founded in 1958 as a land-grant college and occupies a 644-acre (2.61 km^{2}) campus that is shared with North Central State College. The campus offers twelve bachelor's degree programs. The campus practices open admissions. Students can start at Mansfield and finish their degrees there or at The Ohio State University, Columbus, with one or more of Ohio State’s 200+ majors. The Bromfield Library of the Ohio State Mansfield campus provides access to all the resources of the Ohio State University and Ohio Link.

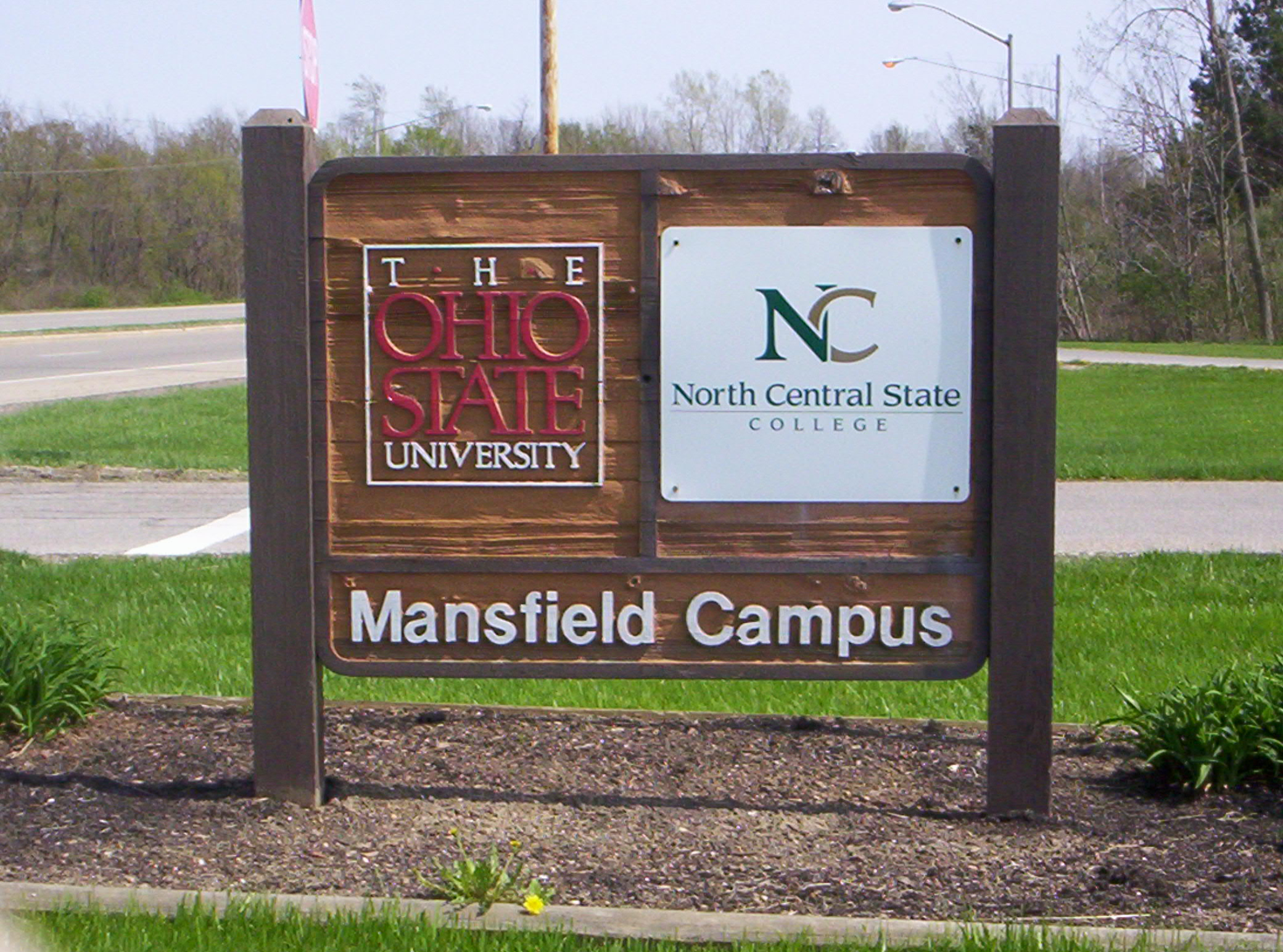
Welcome sign to the combined campus of OSU - Mansfield & North Central State College

== History ==
The Ohio State University at Mansfield was founded in 1958 as a land-grant college and was created through a partnership between Mansfield-area citizens and the state of Ohio. Soon after the Ohio Board of Regents designated Mansfield as the site for an Ohio State regional campus, Mansfield-area citizens mounted a major campaign to acquire land for the campus.

OSU-Mansfield, in 1989, hosted a weekend school for Japanese students.

== Student life ==
=== Student organizations ===
There are about 30 student organizations on the Mansfield Campus.

=== Department of Athletics and Recreation ===
Ohio State Mansfield is a member of the Ohio Regional Campus Conference. The 5 sponsored varsity sports are: Men's Baseball, Women's Soccer, Men's Basketball, Women's Basketball, and Cheerleading (Club).

Intramural sports vary from year to year based on interest levels,

In Fall: Flag Football, Sand Volleyball, and Tennis.
In Winter: Dodgeball and Kickball.
In Spring: Basketball, Sand Volleyball, Soccer, Softball, and Tennis.
