= Northwest State Community College =

Public college near Archbold, Ohio, US

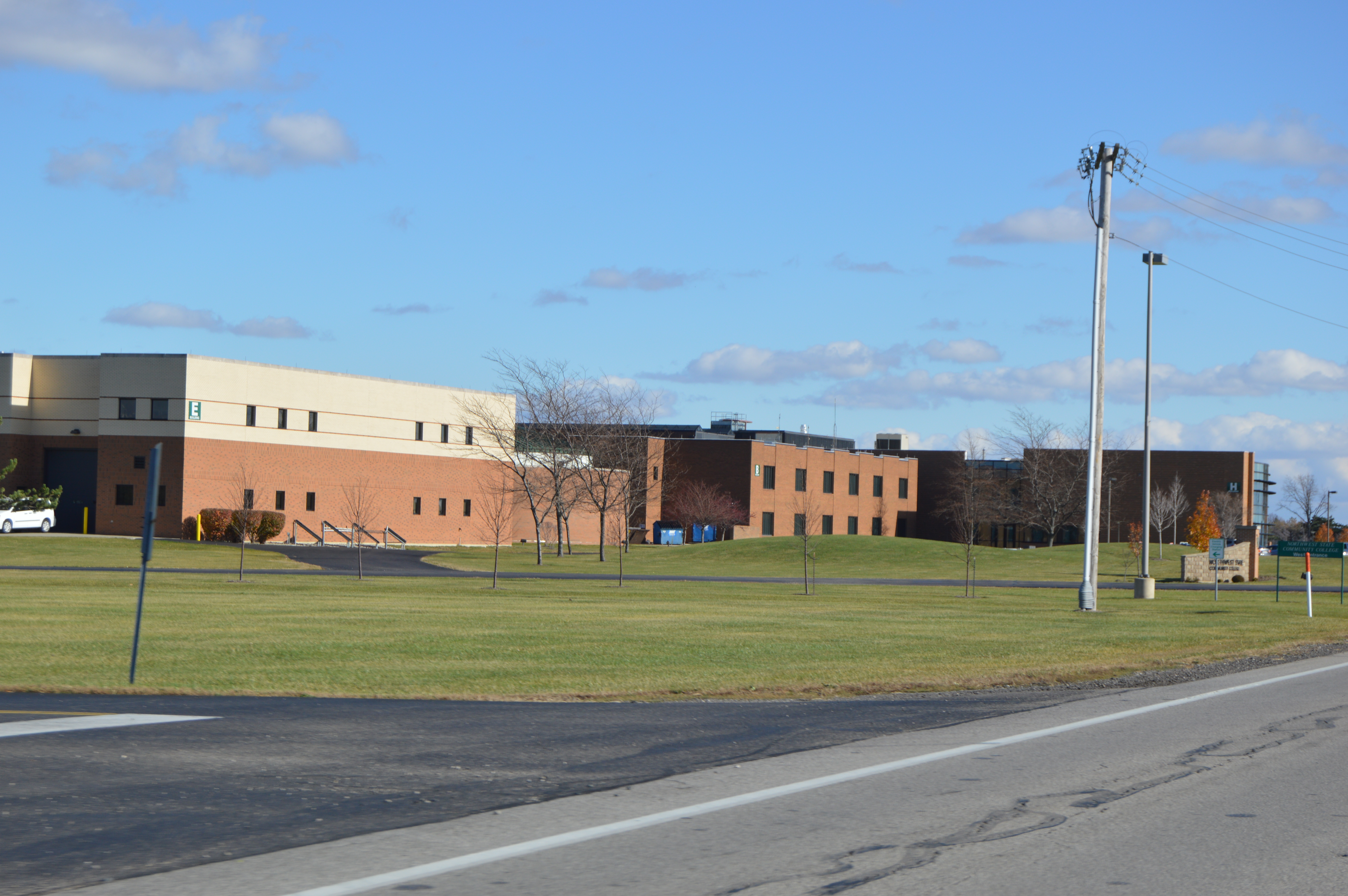
- Type: Public community college
- Established: 1968; 58 years ago
- Parent institution: University System of Ohio
- President: Todd Hernandez
- Administrative staff: 1,300
- Students: 4,123
- Location: Archbold, Ohio, United States; 41°27′02″N 84°17′53″W
- Colors: Green & yellow
- Website: https://northweststate.edu/

Northwest State Community College is a public community college near Archbold, Ohio, United States. It is accredited by the Higher Learning Commission. Its current president is Todd Hernandez.

The college is divided into five academic divisions with nearly 70 degree and certificate programs available. The five academic divisions are the Allied Health Business & Public Service Division, the Arts & Science Division, the Industrial Technologies Division, the Nursing Division, and the STEM Division.

== History ==
In 1968, the Ohio Board of Regents approved the creation of NSCC, then titled "Four County Technical Institute". In 1972, the institute was renamed Northwest Technical College. In 1994, the institute officially became a community college, changing its name one last time to Northwest State Community College.

== Campus ==
The main NSCC Campus in Archbold, OH is a two-story building that is a combination of several different buildings.

NSCC completed developing a full-service campus in Van Wert, OH for Paulding and Van Wert County learners. On-site learning began January 2026.

== Honor societies ==
- Alpha Delta Nu - Nursing honor society.
- Kappa Beta Delta - Business honor society.
- Phi Theta Kappa

== Admissions and students ==
Headcount rates vary due to various economic variables from year to year. However, NSCC is an open enrollment college.

Fall headcount statistics
	2021	2020	2019	2018	2017	2016	2015
First Time (New) Students	1,178	821	1,001	929	1,019	934	906
Returning Students	2,528	2,580	2,998	2,862	2,427	2,861	2,972
High School (College Credit Plus) Students	883	846	760	678	677	783	673
Students under 25 years of age	2,665	2,499	2,439	2,245	2,216	2,277	2,158
Students 25 years of age or over	1,924	1,748	2,320	2,224	1,907	2,301	2,392
Campus Total	4,589	4,247	4,759	4,469	4,123	4,578	4,551

Race/ethnicity, 2021
	Percentage
Black Non-Hispanic	1%
Asian or Pacific Islander	1%
Hispanic	8%
American Indian or Alaskan Native	<1%
White Non-Hispanic	62%
Unstated, Unknown race, Other	27%
Two or more races	1%
Nonresident alien	<1%
