= Wright State University–Lake Campus =

Public university in Celina, Ohio, U.S.

- Motto: Ad docendum, Investigandum, Serviendum (Latin)
- Motto in English: Teaching, Research, Service
- Type: Public
- Established: 1962; 64 years ago
- Parent institution: Wright State University
- Dean: Dan E. Krane
- Academic staff: 68
- Students: 1,205
- Location: Celina, Ohio, U.S. 40.5458°N 84.5089°W
- Campus: Rural, 211 acres (85 ha)
- Colors: Green and gold
- Nickname: Lakers
- Website: lake.wright.edu

Wright State University–Lake Campus is a branch campus of Wright State University located in Jefferson Township, between Celina, and St. Marys, Ohio. The 211 acres (85 ha) campus sits on the northern shore of Grand Lake St. Marys at 7600 Lake Campus Drive. Founded in 1962 by the Western Ohio Educational Foundation, an organization created to support higher education in the Mercer and Auglaize counties of Ohio, the school was affiliated with Ohio Northern University before it became a branch campus of Wright State University in 1969. Located near Dayton, Wright State is part of the University System of Ohio.

== Academics ==
The WSU-Lake Campus offers general education courses and certificate programs, associate degrees, bachelor's degrees and a Master of Business Administration degree. The school participates in the Ohio Transfer Module, which allows for the transfer of credits among Ohio's public colleges and universities. In addition, nine degrees are offered jointly by the WSU-Lake Campus and the main campus of Wright State University in Fairborn, Ohio.

== Facilities ==
- Dwyer Hall: At the center of campus, Dwyer Hall houses classrooms, computer labs, science labs, a cafeteria, a bookstore, student services staff, and faculty and administration offices.
- Andrews Hall: The library is located in Andrews Hall along with the student success center, computer labs, science labs, and a nursing simulation lab.
- Agriculture Education and Water Quality Center: Completed in 2018, the building houses a multipurpose classroom, an agriculture lab, and a water quality lab.
- Trenary Hall: Renovated in 2015, Trenary Hall houses labs and classrooms for engineering academic programs and the Business Enterprise Center.

=== Campus Housing ===
Campus housing consists of three apartment houses on the west end of campus with a capacity of 96 residents. Knapke Villa, East Villa, and West Villa contain townhouse-style apartments on the shores of Grand Lake St. Marys.

== Rankings ==
- Affordable Schools ranked the WSU-Lake Campus third on its list of the "20 Best Affordable Schools in Ohio for Bachelor’s Degree 2020."
- Universities.com ranked WSU-Lake Campus ninth among the "Best Engineering Technology Colleges in Ohio for 2021."
- Prepler.com ranked the WSU-Lake Campus 12th on its list of the "2021 Best Public Colleges in Ohio."
- EdSmart.org ranked the WSU-Lake Campus RN-BSN Completion Program 14th on its list of the "30 Most Affordable Online RN to BSN Programs."
- Great Value Colleges ranked WSU-Lake Campus 18th on its list of the "100 Most Affordable Small Colleges East of the Mississippi."
- CollegeCalc ranked the WSU-Lake Campus 19th on its list of "The Cheapest Colleges in Ohio by In State Tuition for 2021."

== Athletics ==
The Wright State–Lake (WSULC) athletic teams are called the Lakers. The university is a member of the United States Collegiate Athletic Association (USCAA).

WSULC competes in three intercollegiate varsity sports: Men's sports include baseball and basketball; while women's sports include cross country and volleyball.

USCAA - National Champions:

2024 - Kaylie Dameron - Women's Cross Country
