= Lakeland Community College =

Public college in Lake County, Ohio, US

Coordinates: 41°38′17″N 81°21′53″W

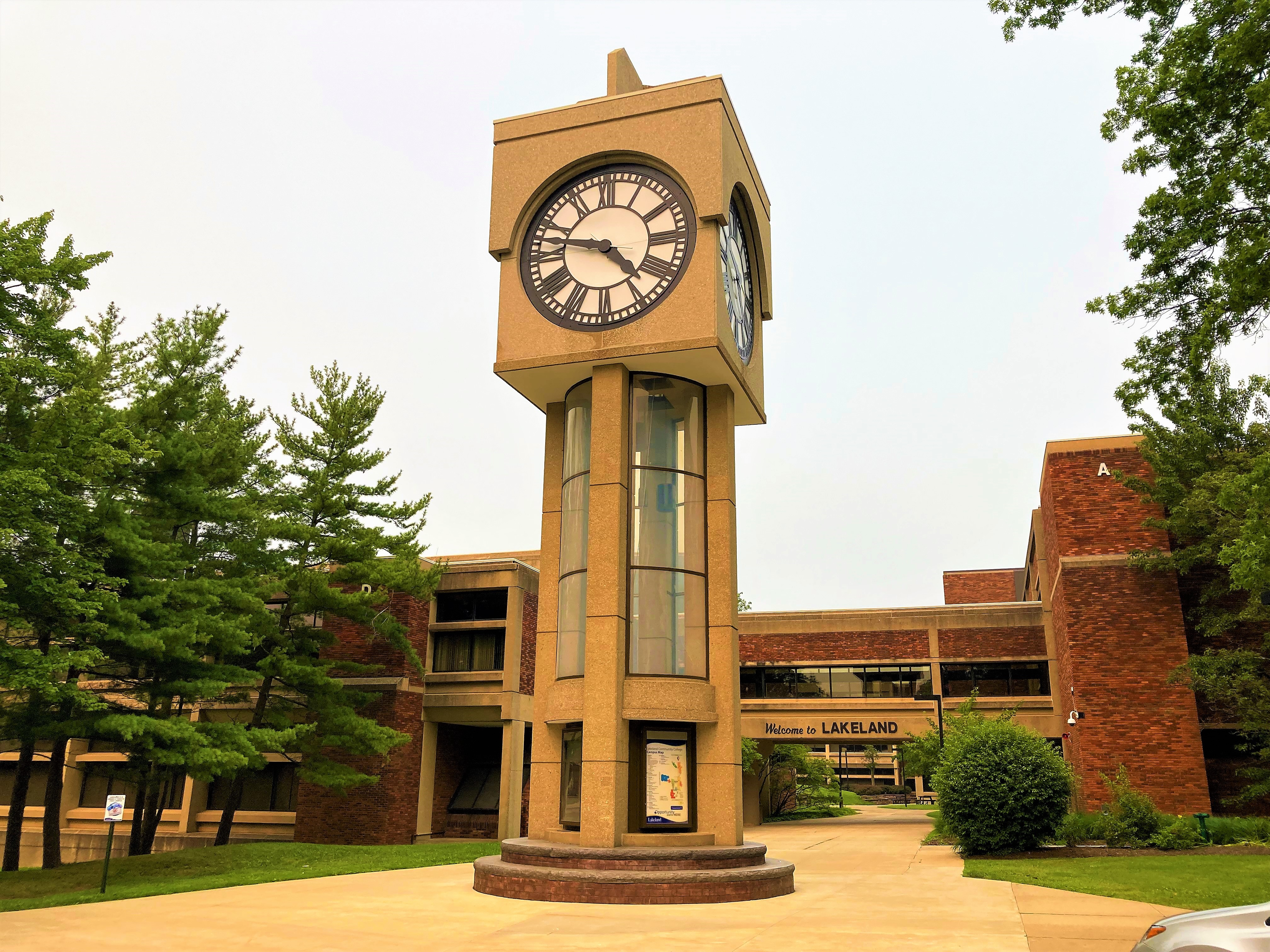
- Type: Public community college
- Established: 1967; 59 years ago
- Parent institution: University System of Ohio
- Academic affiliations: Space-grant
- Students: 8,034
- Location: Kirtland, Ohio, United States
- Colors: Dark Blue, Dark Gray, Gold
- Nickname: Lakers
- Mascot: Crash
- Website: www.lakelandcc.edu

Lakeland Community College is a public community college in Lake County, Ohio, United States. Established in 1967, Lakeland was the first college in Ohio founded by a vote of the people. Today, Lakeland serves more than 8,000 full-time and part-time students each year at the main campus in Kirtland, an off-site location in Madison, and via distance learning.

== History ==
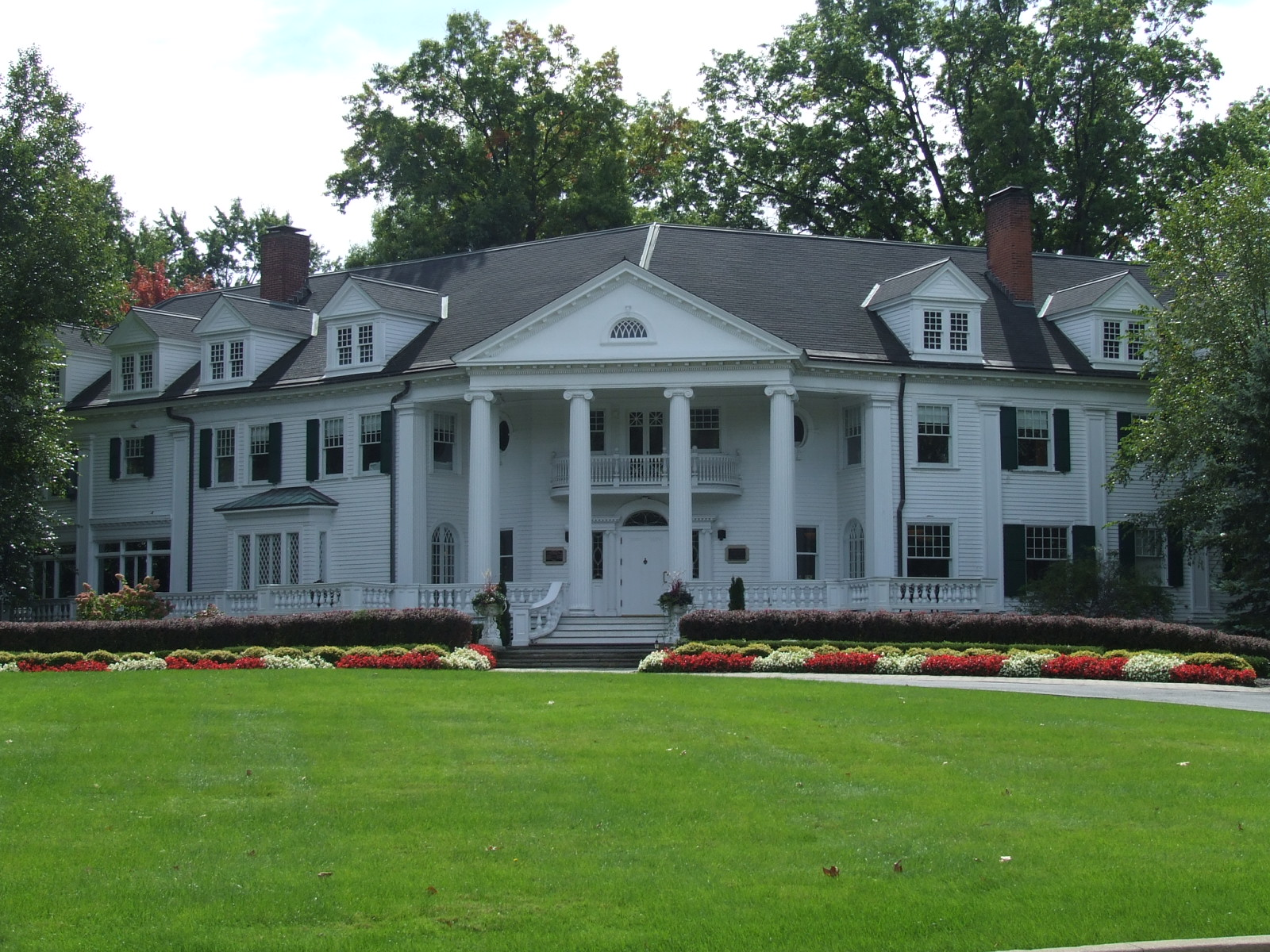
Mooreland Mansion

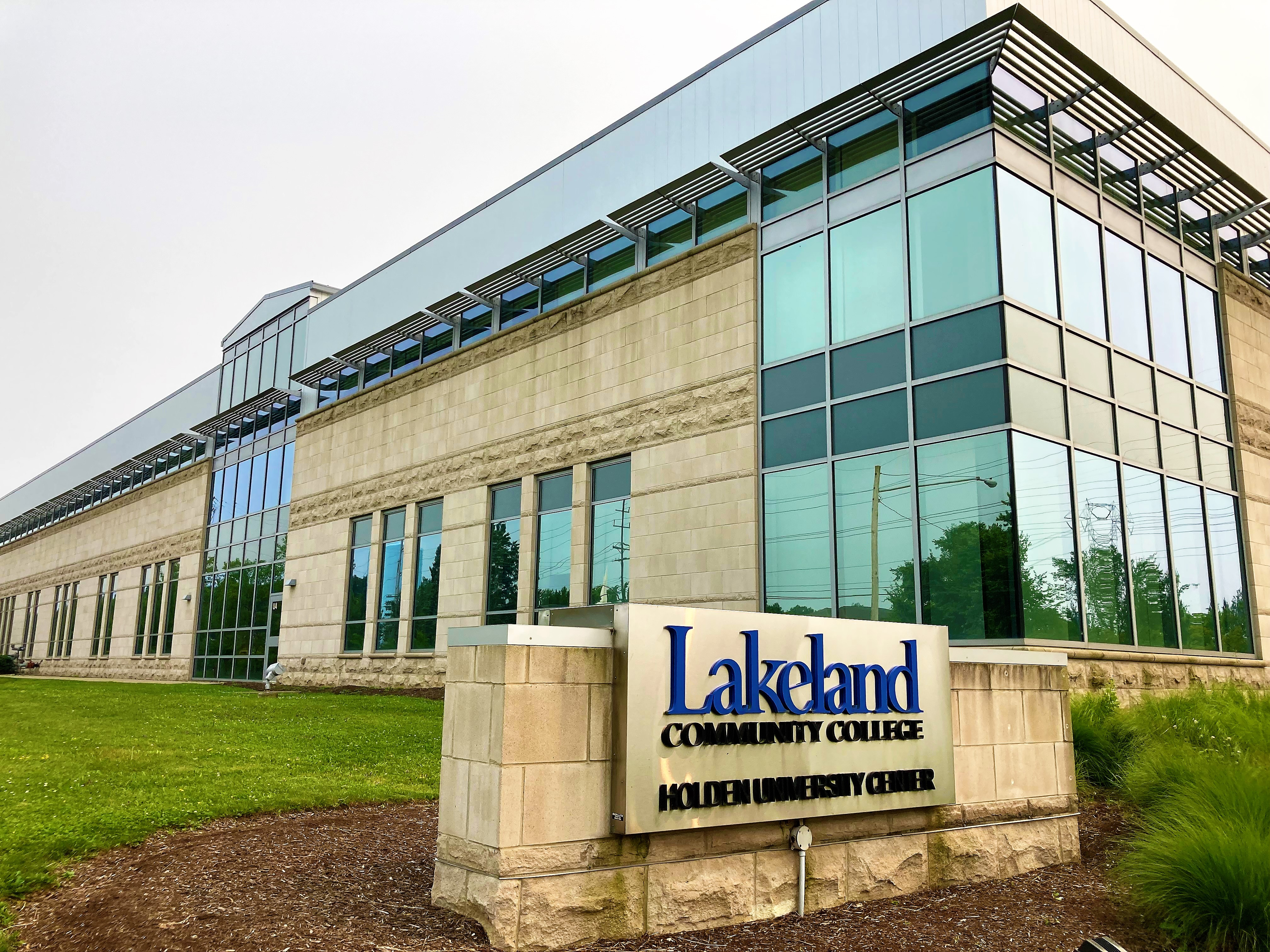
Holden University Center

In 1964, area residents met to consider establishing a community college in Lake County. After the group had gathered enough evidence to justify its establishment, the local League of Women Voters petitioned successfully to place the issue on a countywide ballot, and it passed in 1965; the passage of the related levy passed in 1967. Classes began later that year in various locations in Painesville; the college purchased land for its current permanent location in Kirtland in 1968, with classes commencing there in 1971.

In 1968, 400 acres of land the community college is built upon, including Mooreland Mansion, was purchased by the Lakeland Community College Board of Trustees. Mooreland Mansion, officially the Edward W. and Louise C. Moore Estate as listed on the National Register of Historic Places, built in 1898, expanded in 1906, and renovated in 1998, is located on the campus, and is used as a community facility.

The college expanded in ensuing years, including the construction of the engineering building in 1983, the business building in 1988, the Student Center in 1993, and the Health Technologies Building in 1995; the renovation and expansion of the library in 1997; the renovation of the Athletic and Fitness Center in 2000; the construction of the Holden University Center in 2011; and the addition of extension campuses in the Lake County locations of Madison in 1994 and Willowick in 1997. The Health Technologies Building was expanded further in the 2010s, reopening in 2018.

Lakeland's mailing address was Mentor from 1971 to 1994. (About a quarter of Lakeland's property extends into Mentor.)

Lakeland was the site of training camp for the Cleveland Browns from 1982 to 1991.

In 2024, the state auditor issued a report that the college was experiencing financial distress that was nearly severe enough to warrant formal action by the state. Enrollment was about half of what it was in 2012 but staffing levels remained the same and the college had opened new facilities, a combination of factors that had led the college into debt.

After multiple staffing cuts and changes to program offerings, Lakeland sold their newly built Holden University Center which sat vacant. On August 20, 2024, Signature Health signed a contract to purchase Lakeland's Holden University Center for $8 million. The purchase relieved some of Lakeland's financial deficit allowing the college to continue providing education to the region.

== Academics ==
Lakeland is accredited by the Higher Learning Commission. The college offers more than 130 associate degree and certificate programs that prepare students for employment or transfer to a four-year college or university. Areas of study include arts and humanities, business technologies, engineering technologies, science and health technologies, and social science and public service. The college also offers non-credit community learning and professional development classes and workforce development training.

The Holden Center, constructed in 2011 was made to expand their offerings past 2-year degrees and into 4-year programs by partnering with other colleges. As of July, 2023, they have 11 partner colleges: BGSU, Youngstown State University, Ursuline College, The University of Akron, Notre Dame College, Lake Erie College, Kent State University, John Carroll University, Franklin University, Case Western University and Cleveland State University.

Their most popular degree program is Liberal arts and sciences, likely accounting for all of the associates of arts (no concentration) degrees they grant. Their second-most popular programs is nursing, making up over 10% of 2021 graduates. This may be in part due to the many prominent healthcare centers in northeast Ohio including the Cleveland Clinic and University Hospitals.

Lakeland offers several credit and noncredit courses at nearby partner high schools via the College Credit Plus Program. Classes offered here are the same as those in the regular Lakeland curriculum and are taught by the same pool of full-time and part-time faculty. Community learning courses are also offered, providing residents of the service area an opportunity to access noncredit, non-grade-based learning experiences. Courses are offered during the fall and spring semesters with limited offerings in the summer. Courses are conducted throughout the day, evening, and Saturday mornings.

== Athletics ==
Lakeland Community College offers seven varsity athletic teams. Women's sports include basketball, softball, and volleyball. Men's sports include baseball, basketball, and soccer. Lakeland CC participates in Region XII of the NJCAA and are members of the Ohio Community College Athletic Conference (OCCAC).

The Lakeland Lakers have long been represented by a line drawing of a wave and a simple "L" on uniform caps. In 2019, a new logo and mascot named "Crash" were selected by the college.

== See also ==
- List of colleges and universities in Ohio
- List of community colleges
