= BGSU Firelands =

University campus in Ohio, US

- Type: Public satellite campus
- Established: 1968; 58 years ago
- Parent institution: Bowling Green State University
- Dean: Ram Veerapaneni (Interim)
- Faculty: 140
- Students: 1,949 (fall 2023)
- Location: Huron, Ohio, United States; 41.398°N 82.595°W
- Colors: Orange & Brown
- Website: www.bgsu.edu/firelands

BGSU Firelands is a satellite campus of Bowling Green State University in Huron, Ohio. BGSU Firelands is located near the shores of Lake Erie in Huron, Ohio, about 60 miles (97 km) east of Bowling Green, Ohio. It is a separate college of the Bowling Green State University system. BGSU Firelands has been a regional campus of BGSU since 1968, when the first building (now Foundation Hall) at the Huron location was opened. Before that, classes were held in Sandusky High School until this building was completed. The campus practices open admissions. BGSU Firelands had nearly 2,000 students enrolled as of fall 2023, 40% of whom were dual-enrolled high school students.

== Campus ==
=== Facilities ===
BGSU Firelands has four buildings: Foundation Hall, George Mylander Hall (formerly the West Building), the North Building and the newest addition completed in 2003, The Cedar Point Center. The Cedar Point Center hosts an array of cutting edge educational technology tools for teaching or conferencing onsite and/or from a distance, via satellite and broadband communications modes.

The Allied Health construction project was constructed during the 2014-15 academic year and includes the addition of more laboratory spaces for the health field degree programs offered at BGSU Firelands. This addition opened in the spring of 2016.

Some off-site classes are held in Sandusky, Norwalk, and Elyria.

=== McBride Arboretum ===
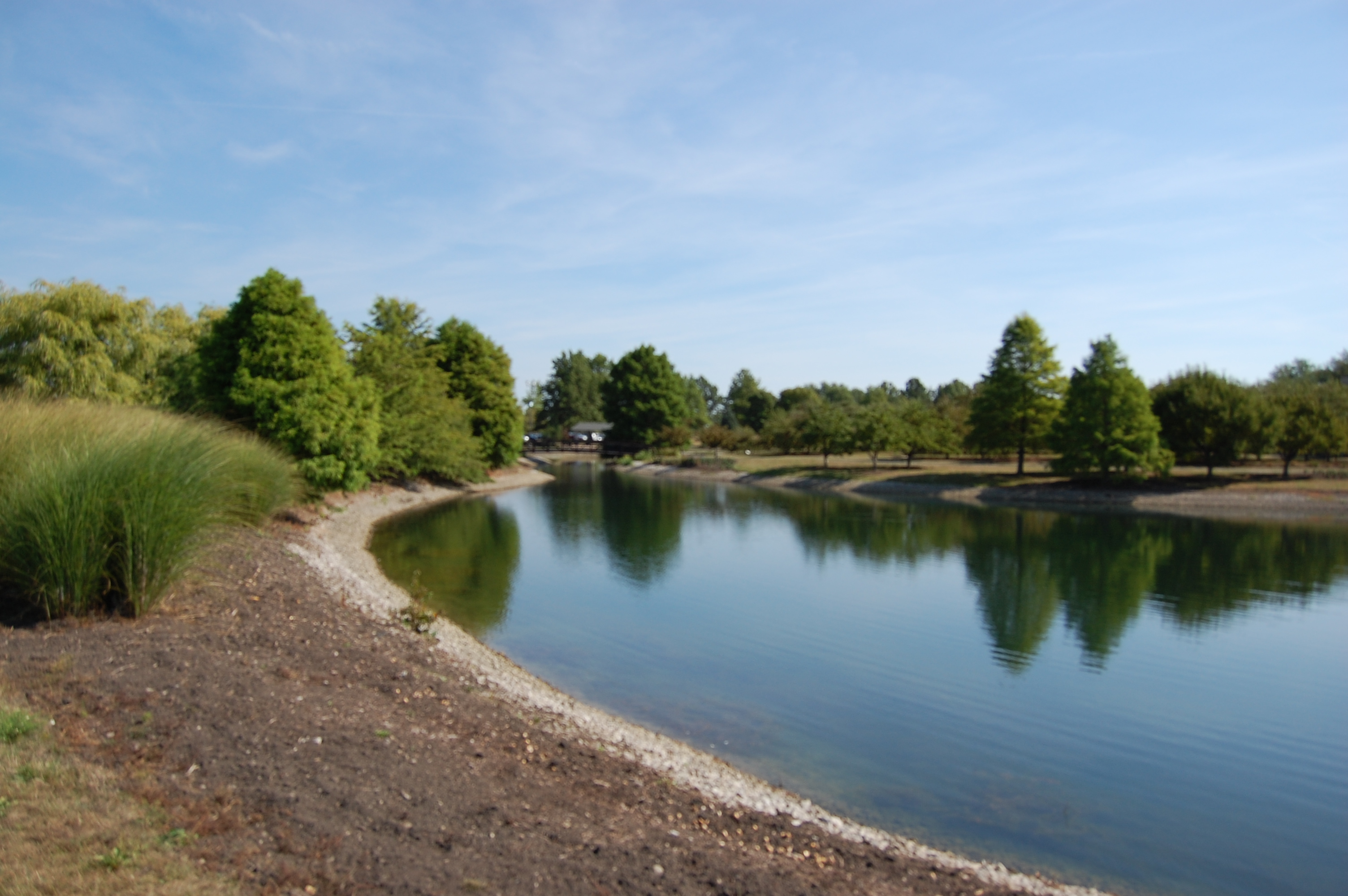
The McBride Arboretum

BGSU Firelands is also the site of the McBride Arboretum (named in honor of Dr. James McBride, the college's first dean), a natural spot that was carefully thought out, designed and implemented to showcase the plants, trees and grasses that are a part of the natural setting of the Firelands region. The latest addition to the Arboretum was donated by Deering family of Erie County and is an all-weather deck built along one of the many small bodies of water in the Arboretum, which is 60 feet (18 m) long, on which students and the public can enjoy nature. The Arboretum is managed for BGSU Firelands by Erie MetroParks.
