= Owens Community College =

Public college in Toledo and Findlay, Ohio, US

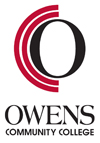
- Type: Public community college
- Established: 1965; 61 years ago
- Parent institution: University System of Ohio
- Endowment: $2.1 million (2007)
- President: Dione Somerville
- Administrative staff: 1,300
- Students: 8,282
- Location: Toledo, Ohio, United States; 41°35′16″N 83°32′25″W
- Campus: Suburban
- Colors: Red, White, & Black
- Nickname: Express
- Sporting affiliations: OCCAC
- Mascot: Big E
- Website: www.owens.edu

Owens Community College (OCC) is a public community college with campuses in Perrysburg and Findlay, Ohio, United States. Owens was founded in 1965 in Toledo and chartered in 1967. The Findlay campus opened in 1983. Owens Community College is named after Michael J. Owens, the Toledo-based inventor of automated glass bottle-making technology.

== History ==
The Toledo campus was originally the Rossford Army Depot from 1941 to 1963.

On January 21, 2004, President George W. Bush gave a speech at Owens Community College pledging support for community colleges and job training programs. Former President Bill Clinton would later give a speech at the campus as part of the Barack Obama 2012 presidential campaign.

== Campuses ==
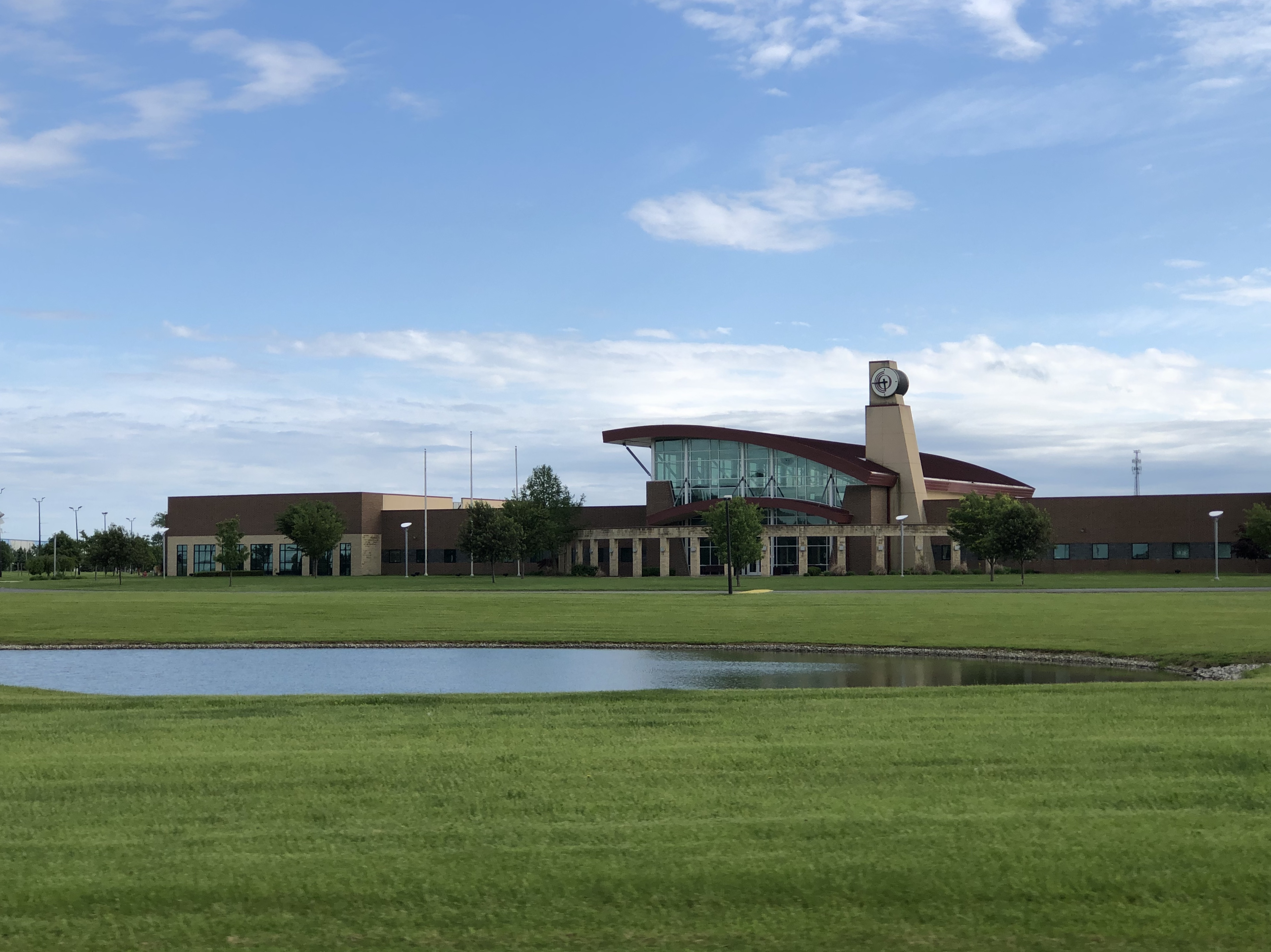
The Findlay area Owens campus.

The Owens Community College Toledo-area campus covers more than 280 acres (1.1 km^{2}) and is located in Perrysburg Township. OCC also maintains a learning center in downtown Toledo. The Findlay-area campus is located in Findlay, Ohio and covers more than 60 acres (240,000 m^{2}). The new campus for Findlay was completed in fall of 2005.

OCC's Arrowhead Park campus, located in Maumee, closed in 2016.

In April 2007, Owens opened the new Center for Emergency Preparedness. This $20.5 million center serves as a state, regional and national education and resource center for public safety and emergency training. The 110-acre (0.45 km^{2}) facility features full-size, state-of-the-art training props that were developed with emphasis on realism and safety, including a Boeing 727-100, burn simulators, dive and rescue pond and mock city. Training props are used to train students and area first responders on procedures for emergency situations and recovery maneuvers. The center a fiber-optic network for research and education. It will allow fire, police, emergency responders and other emergency personnel to conduct exercises via distance learning on a variety of simulated terror incidents, emergency hazards and natural disasters.

== Academics ==
In 2006, Owens Community College and Lourdes University started a partnership program called 60/60, which allows allied health students at Owens to also earn a baccalaureate degree at Lourdes.

Owens also offers Post Secondary Enrollment Options to area high school students. Qualified students have the opportunity to take classes at Owens that may count for both high school and college credit while they are still in high school. In many cases, the cost of tuition, books and other fees can be paid for by the state of Ohio.

== Athletics ==
The Owens Express compete in the Ohio Community College Athletic Conference. Men's sports include Basketball, Baseball. Women's sports include Basketball, Volleyball, and Softball.

== Notable alumni ==
- Madison Hubbell - ice dancer
- Keiffer Hubbell - ice dancer
- James Kelly - basketball player
- Bill Laimbeer - basketball player
- Jim Penix - basketball player
