= Eastern Gateway Community College =

Public community college in Ohio, U.S. (1968–2024)

Coordinates: 40°22′35″N 80°40′19″W

- Type: Public community college
- Active: 1968–2024
- Parent institution: University System of Ohio
- Accreditation: HLC
- Students: 15,300 (fall 2023)
- Location: Steubenville and Youngstown, Ohio, U.S.
- Campus: Suburban
- Colors: Blue & white
- Mascot: Edugator
- Website: www.egcc.edu

Eastern Gateway Community College was a public community college in Steubenville and Youngstown, Ohio, United States. Founded in 1968, it was placed on probation by the Higher Learning Commission in 2021 for concerns about "assessment, HR record keeping, and data collection and analysis." The college began experiencing severe financial distress in 2023 and eventually closed on October 31, 2024.

== History ==
The school was chartered in 1966 as Jefferson County Technical Institute, opening its doors for the first time in 1968 to serve the residents of Jefferson County, Ohio. It later changed its name to Jefferson Technical College in 1977. In 1995, the technical college became a community college and the name changed once more to Jefferson Community College. In 2009, the college expanded its service district to include three Ohio counties in addition to the original Jefferson: Columbiana, Mahoning, and Trumbull. This resulted in a further name change and the college became known as Eastern Gateway Community College in October 2009.

The college briefly drew national attention in 2020 when its board of trustees fired the college's president. He had been placed on administrative leave and was subsequently fired by a unanimous vote of the board for "dereliction of duty and inappropriate management."

In late 2021, the college was again the focus of national attention when its accreditor, the Higher Learning Commission, placed the college on probation due to concerns about a new relationship with a for-profit company that focused on increasing student enrollments in online courses. Through its relationship with the Student Resource Center, EGCC nearly doubled its class sizes in online courses and eliminated textbooks in those courses. These new enrollments came primarily from union members or their family members as the program was largely aimed at allowing them to attend the college free of charge to them through a combination of grants and a last dollar scholarship. In a November 2021 news article, Inside Higher Ed reported that "43,890 of the 46,606 [students enrolled at the college] are union members or family of union members." The Student Resource Center received 50% of the profits from these new enrollments which was "slightly more than $7 million" in the 2020 fiscal year. Concerns about the quality of teaching at the college during this rapid expansion prompted the college's accreditor to place it on probation because "there is no evidence Eastern Gateway's free-college-for-union-members business model provides a high-quality education." Two months later, these same concerns led the U.S. Department of Education to open its own investigation into the use of federal financial aid at the college. In 2023, the college shut down the free-college-for-union-members program.

On February 29, 2024, Eastern Gateway announced it was pausing enrollment. With the announcement, Eastern Gateway partnered with Youngstown State University to transfer existing students to YSU and other colleges. At about the same time, YSU also announced its first satellite campus in Steubenville to serve students in the area. About a month later, the EGCC's board of trustees announced that the college's financial challenges were so severe that the college would likely close in June despite an emergency infusion of $6 million from the State of Ohio. The trustees also announced that the college was resigning from the Higher Learning Commission, the college's accreditor, effective on November 1. Faculty began to receive notices at the end of March 2024 stating that their contracts would be not be renewed; contracts still in operation at that time were subsequently allowed to expire on July 31, 2024. The final day of instruction was July 28, 2024, with a final commencement ceremony held on August 10, 2024. The board of trustees later decided on an October 31, 2024 dissolution date, resulting in the college's now defunct status.

In November 2025, the Ohio Auditor of State released a financial audit for fiscal year 2023 that issued disclaimers of opinion on Eastern Gateway’s financial statements and on its compliance with major federal programs, citing pervasive problems with recordkeeping and the reliability of underlying data. The audit reported more than $17.3 million in questioned costs—effectively all federal student financial aid disbursed that year—and a total of 44 findings related to internal controls, compliance, and financial management, and noted that the Auditor’s Special Investigations Unit was continuing a separate investigation into the college’s operations.

== Academics ==
The college used open admissions. Eastern Gateway Community College offered 60 majors in the areas of business technologies, information technologies, engineering technologies, health and public services. The degrees offered are Associate of Arts, Associate of Science, Associate of Applied Business, Associate of Applied Science, Associate of Technical Studies, and Associate of Individualized Studies.

Tuition for in-state students enrolled during the 2017–2018 academic year was $117 per credit hour. Tuition was waived for students living in Jefferson, Mahoning, Trumbull, and Columbiana counties.
