= Lorain County Community College =

Public college in Elyria, Ohio, US

Coordinates: 41°24′46″N 82°04′21″W

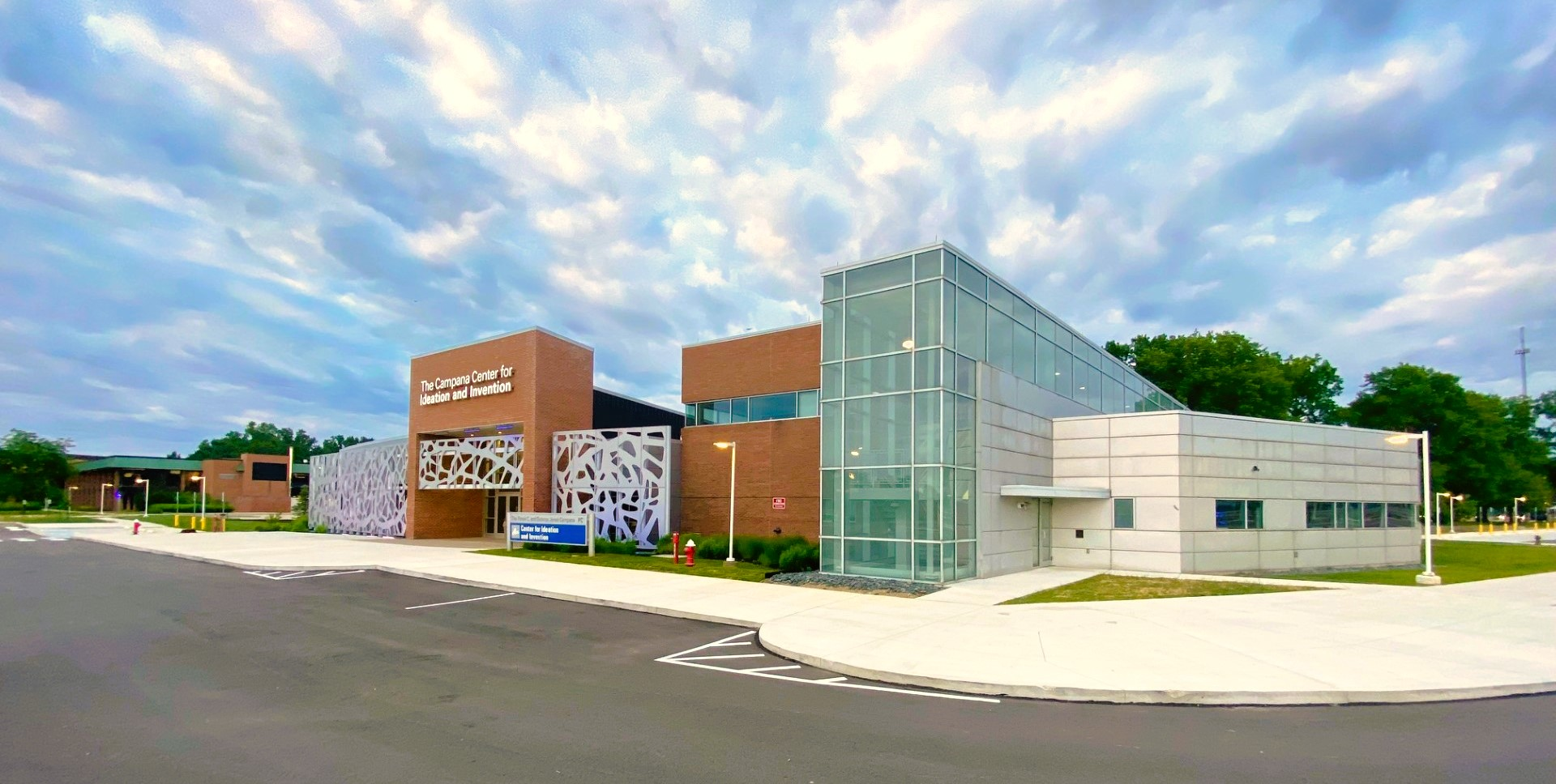
- Type: Public community college
- Established: 1963; 63 years ago
- Parent institution: University System of Ohio
- Academic affiliations: Space-grant
- Endowment: $67.1 million (2025)
- President: Marcia Ballinger
- Students: 12,773 (fall 2023)
- Location: Elyria, Ohio, United States
- Colors: Navy Blue, Yellow, White
- Nickname: Commodores
- Website: www.lorainccc.edu

Lorain County Community College (LCCC) is a public community college in Elyria, Ohio, United States, with learning centers in Wellington, North Ridgeville, and Lorain. In addition to associate degrees and certificates, students can earn bachelor's and master's degrees on campus through the college's partnerships with universities.

== History ==
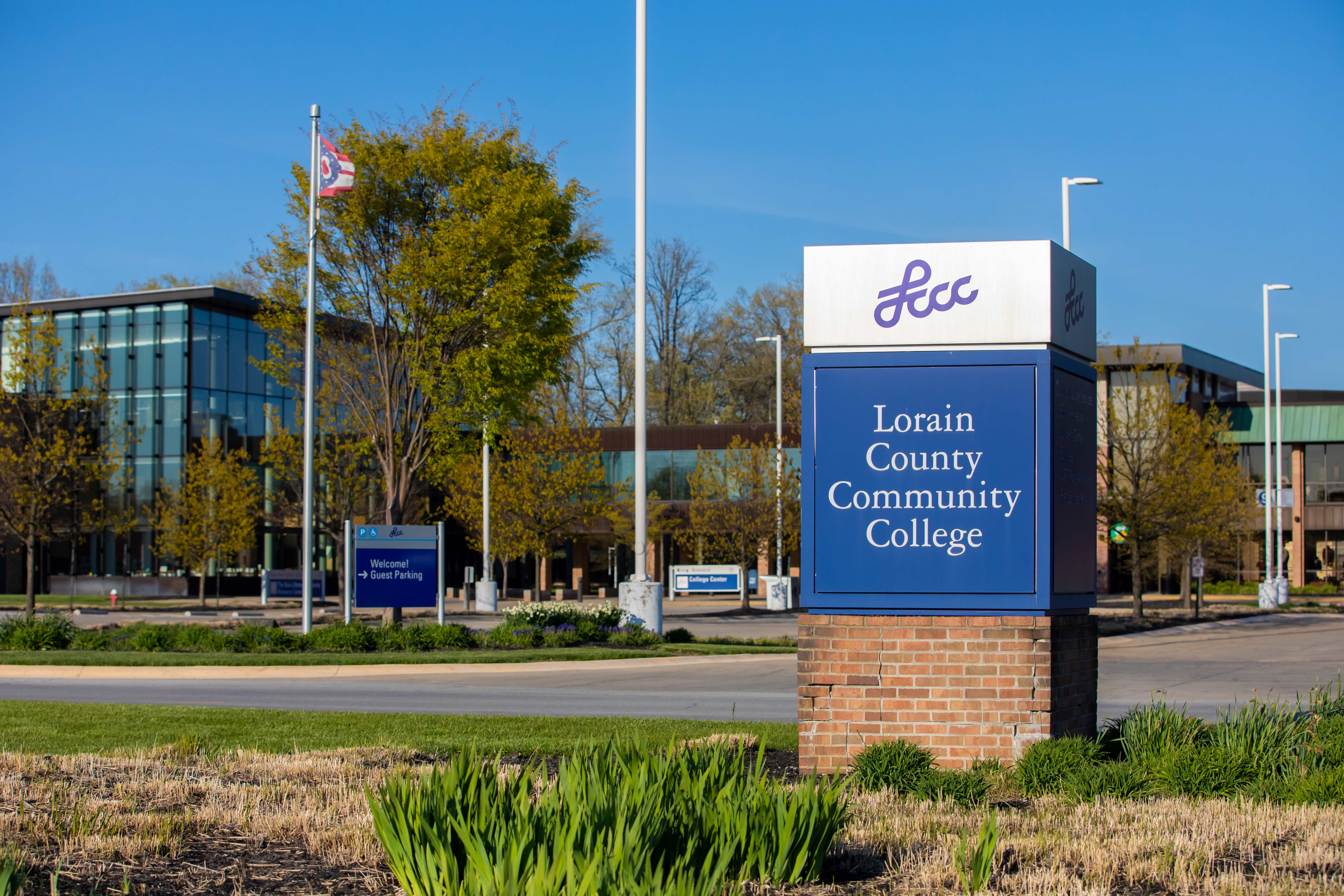
The Lorain County Community College campus in Elyria, Ohio.

Lorain County Community College was the first community college in Ohio to have a permanent campus, located at 1005 North Abbe Road, Elyria, Ohio. The college was founded on July 15, 1963.

Its fifth president, Marcia Ballinger, was inaugurated on July 1, 2016.

In 2018, the college was recognized by the American Association of Community Colleges (AACC) as the 2018 Recipient of the AACC Award of Excellence in Student Success. Two years later, Achieving the Dream awarded the college the 2020 Leah Meyer Austin Award, ATD's national prize reserved for network colleges that show greatest, sustained improvements in student outcomes and student success.

== Academics ==
LCCC operates on a semester system and is accredited by the Higher Learning Commission. It offers program and career pathways in arts and humanities; engineering, business and information technologies; health and wellness, science and mathematics; social sciences and human services.

The college offers traditional and online courses for numerous associate programs as well as classes that easily transfer to other colleges and universities.

LCCC's Division of Arts and Humanities has been home to several distinguished scholars and artists, notably 2013 Pulitzer Prize for Poetry finalist and 2006 Lannan Literary Award-winning poet and memoirist Bruce Weigl and composer Jeffrey Mumford, 2013 composer-in-residence at the National Gallery of Art. Marilyn Valentino, professor emeritus of English, served as national chair of the Conference on College Composition and Communication in 2010.

The college was the first community college in Ohio to offer an applied bachelor's degree in micro-electrical mechanical systems (MEMS). The MEMS program prepares students for entry into a career after completing hands-on paid internships. LCCC is also currently the only community college in Ohio to offer a MEMS associate degree program.

LCCC was the first community college to exhibit a fabrication lab, the "Fab Lab", on its campus. As a Massachusetts Institute of Technology project in 2005, it was the second public facility in the country with the equipment. This technology allows students and the community first-hand experience with a very technical and economical skill.
