= Clark State College =

Community college in Springfield, Ohio, US

Coordinates: 39°53′45″N 83°47′57″W

- Former names: Clark County Technical Education Program (1962–1966); Clark County Technical Institute (1966–1972); Clark Technical College(1972–1988); Clark State Community College (1988–2020)
- Type: Public community college
- Established: 1962; 64 years ago
- Parent institution: University System of Ohio
- Endowment: $30 million (2024)
- President: Evon Walters Ed.D.
- Faculty: 82
- Administrative staff: 154
- Undergraduates: 4,704
- Location: Springfield, Ohio, U.S.
- Colors: Navy blue, royal blue, gold
- Nickname: Eagles
- Sporting affiliations: NJCAA, OCCAC
- Website: www.clarkstate.edu

Clark State College is a public community college in Springfield, Ohio, United States. It opened in 1962 as Springfield and Clark County Technical Education Program. It has additional locations in Beavercreek, Bellefontaine, and Xenia.

== History ==
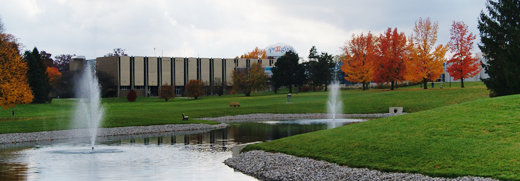

The Springfield and Clark County Technical Education Program opened in 1962 and began to offer technical training for residents of Springfield, Ohio, and surrounding communities. The charter for the organization of the Clark County Technical Institute was effective February 18, 1966. Clark County Technical Institute became Ohio’s first technical college to be sanctioned by the Ohio Board of Regents, the name changed from Clark County Technical Institute to Clark Technical College by action of the Ohio Board of Regents on February 17, 1972. The charter changed from Clark Technical College to Clark State Community College on June 17, 1988, and the college began offering Associate of Arts and Associate of Science transfer degrees that same year.

With the addition of bachelor’s degrees now available at Clark State, the Board of Trustees had voted to change the name of the institution to encompass the advancements in educational opportunities made by the college. The college operates a peace officer academy. On January 1, 2021, Clark State Community College became known as Clark State College.

== Accreditation ==
Clark State College is accredited by the Higher Learning Commission. The institution is a member of the Strategic Ohio Council for Higher Education (SOCHE).

== Athletics ==
The Clark State College athletic teams are a member of the National Junior College Athletic Association (NJCAA), regularly playing teams in the Midwest. Clark State is also a participating member of the Ohio Community College Athletic Conference (OCCAC).

The Eagles compete at the varsity level in Men's Baseball, Men's Basketball, Women's Basketball, Women's Softball, Women's Volleyball, and E-Sports. .
