= Terra State Community College =

College in Fremont, Ohio, U.S.

Terra Community College
- Former names: Vanguard Technical Institute, Terra Technical College
- Motto: Transforming Lives. Changing Communities.
- Type: Public community college
- Established: 1968; 58 years ago
- Parent institution: University System of Ohio
- Endowment: $6 million
- President: Chad Breeden
- Total staff: 339
- Students: 1,524
- Location: Fremont, Ohio, United States; 41°21′12″N 83°09′31″W
- Campus: 143 acres (58 ha); Suburban
- Nicknames: Titans, Thunder, Terra Tech
- Mascot: Titus
- Website: www.terra.edu

Terra Community College is a public community college in Fremont, Ohio, United States. It was founded in 1968 as Vanguard Technical Institute, a night school using the facilities of Vanguard Vocational Center. Terra's district includes Sandusky, Seneca, and the eastern portion of Ottawa counties.

== History ==
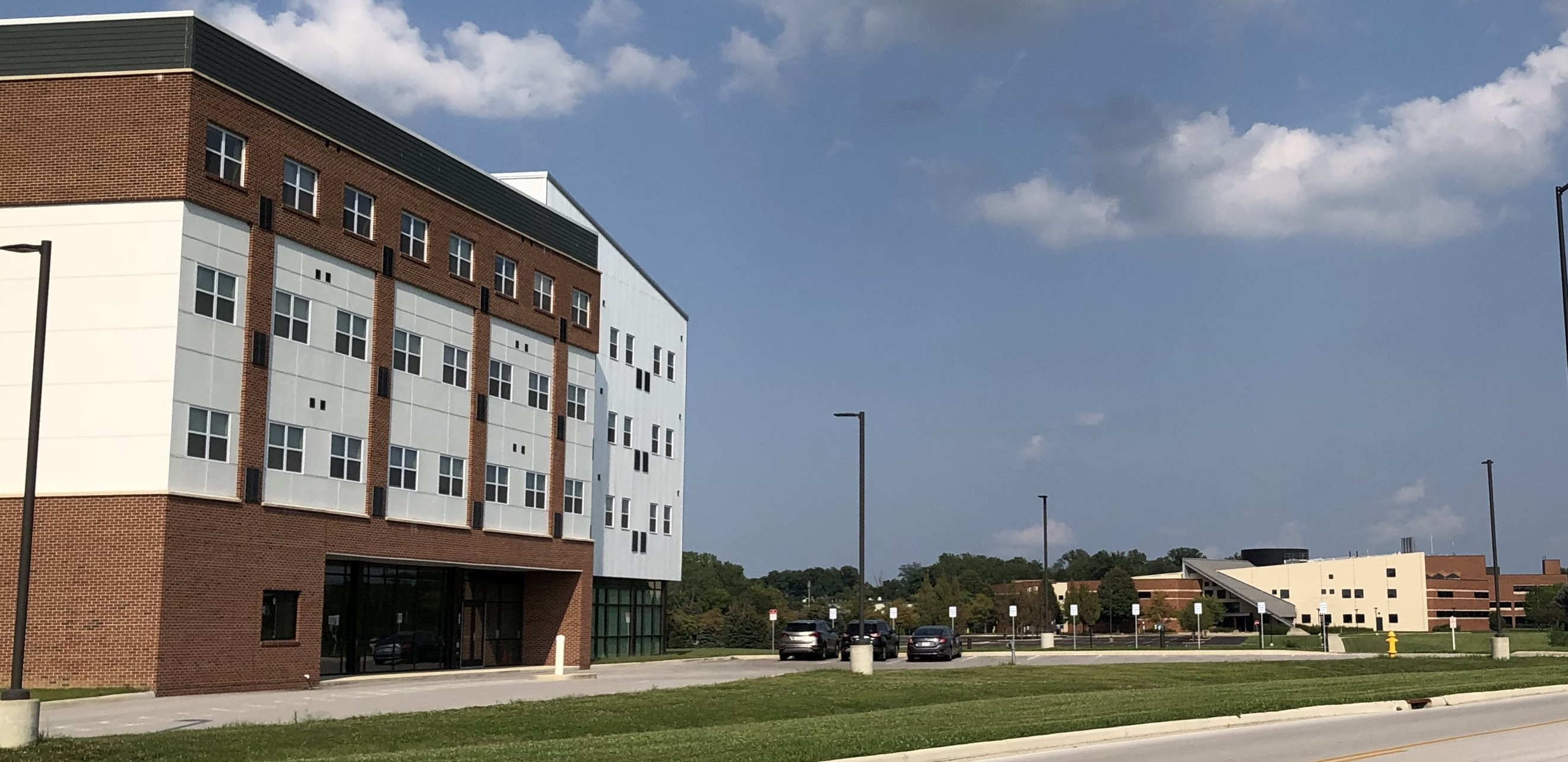

Terra State Community College was founded as Vanguard Technical Institute in September 1968, a night school at Vanguard Vocational Center. Initially enrolling high school juniors exclusively, the institute focused on technical classes such as electronics, mechanical design, mechanical engineering, data processing, and computer technology during its inaugural year.

In 1969, the Ohio Board of Regents made the institute a state institution of higher learning. This authorization empowered the institute to confer the Associate Degree in Applied Business and the Associate Degree in Applied Science, expanding its academic offerings.

The early 1970s witnessed a significant physical expansion with the construction of three new buildings on Cedar Street, adjacent to the Vanguard Vocational Center. This laid the foundation for a more comprehensive educational environment.

As Terra Technical College emerged in 1973, it embarked on a journey of continued growth and development. The institution diversified its class schedules in 1971, introducing both day and evening classes to accommodate a broader student demographic.

The late 1970s and early 1980s were marked by pivotal construction projects. In 1979, work began on a new campus on Napoleon Road, culminating in the completion of Roy Klay Hall—the first building named in honor of Terra’s founding president. The subsequent years saw the addition of the Industrial Technology Building in 1980 and the General Technologies Building (GTB) in 1984, housing various academic and support facilities.

The college was renamed Terra Technical College in 1973.

The 1990s brought further expansion and modernization. In 1992, the Engineering Building, spanning 58,000 square feet, opened its doors, becoming the hub for the Engineering, Technologies & Mathematics Division. In 1997, the Early Learning Center enriched Terra State's offerings by providing a learning laboratory for the Early Childhood Education Program and offering childcare services to the community.

Terra Technical College officially became Terra State Community College in the summer of 1994, broadening its academic scope by adding the Associate of Arts and Associate of Science to the existing Associate of Applied Science degrees.

The turn of the century brought significant additions to Terra State's infrastructure. The Skilled Trades Center opened its doors in 2010, providing state-of-the-art facilities for programs such as HVAC-R, automotive, and welding. In 2011, the Marsha S. Bordner Arts and Health Technologies Center expanded Terra State's capacity in music, arts, nursing, and allied health programs.

Terra State continued to evolve in the following years. The Ronald L. Neeley Conference & Hospitality Center opened in 2013, serving as an event planning lab for students in the hospitality management program. In 2018, Terra State achieved a milestone by opening The Landings at Terra Village, becoming the second community college in Ohio to offer on-campus housing for 200 students.

The year 2019 marked the inauguration of the Doepker Leadership and Entrepreneurial Center, contributing to regional leadership development and offering personal enrichment courses. Athletics were relaunched under a new moniker, the Terra State Titans.

In 2023, recognizing the demand for specialized skills, Terra State Community College expanded its capacity for welding and CNC instruction.

In March 2026, the Ohio Department of Higher Education declared Terra State Community College to be under fiscal watch following financial reporting and fiscal-management concerns. The declaration followed findings by the Ohio Auditor of State regarding the college's financial statements, audits, cash flow, and payment processing. Terra State subsequently began developing a financial recovery plan.

=== Financial difficulties ===
In late March 2026, Terra State Community College President Ron Schumacher resigned. The Board of Trustees subsequently appointed Senior Vice President Dr. Cory Stine as interim president. Stine served as interim president for a brief period before resigning in May 2026. He was succeeded by current interim president Dr. Chad Breeden.

Enrollment at Terra State has declined over the long term and has gotten worse over recent years. The college reported 2,240 students enrolled in fall 2025, about a quarter the enrollment it had in fall 2000, according to the Ohio Department of Higher Education.

At the start of the fall 2026 semester, the college was reported to have only 1,500 currently enrolled students. This decline was attributed primarily to cuts to academic programs and the college’s fiscal watch status.

=== Presidents ===
Presidents of the college have included:

- Roy Klay, 1968-1978
- Richard Simon, 1979-1993
- Charlotte Lee, 1993-2003
- Marsha Bordner, 2003-2012
- Jerome Webster, 2014-2018
- Ron Schumacher, 2018-2026
- Cory Stine, 2026
- Chad Breeden, 2026-present

== Academics ==
Terra State Community College offers more than 70 degree and certificate programs.

== Campus ==
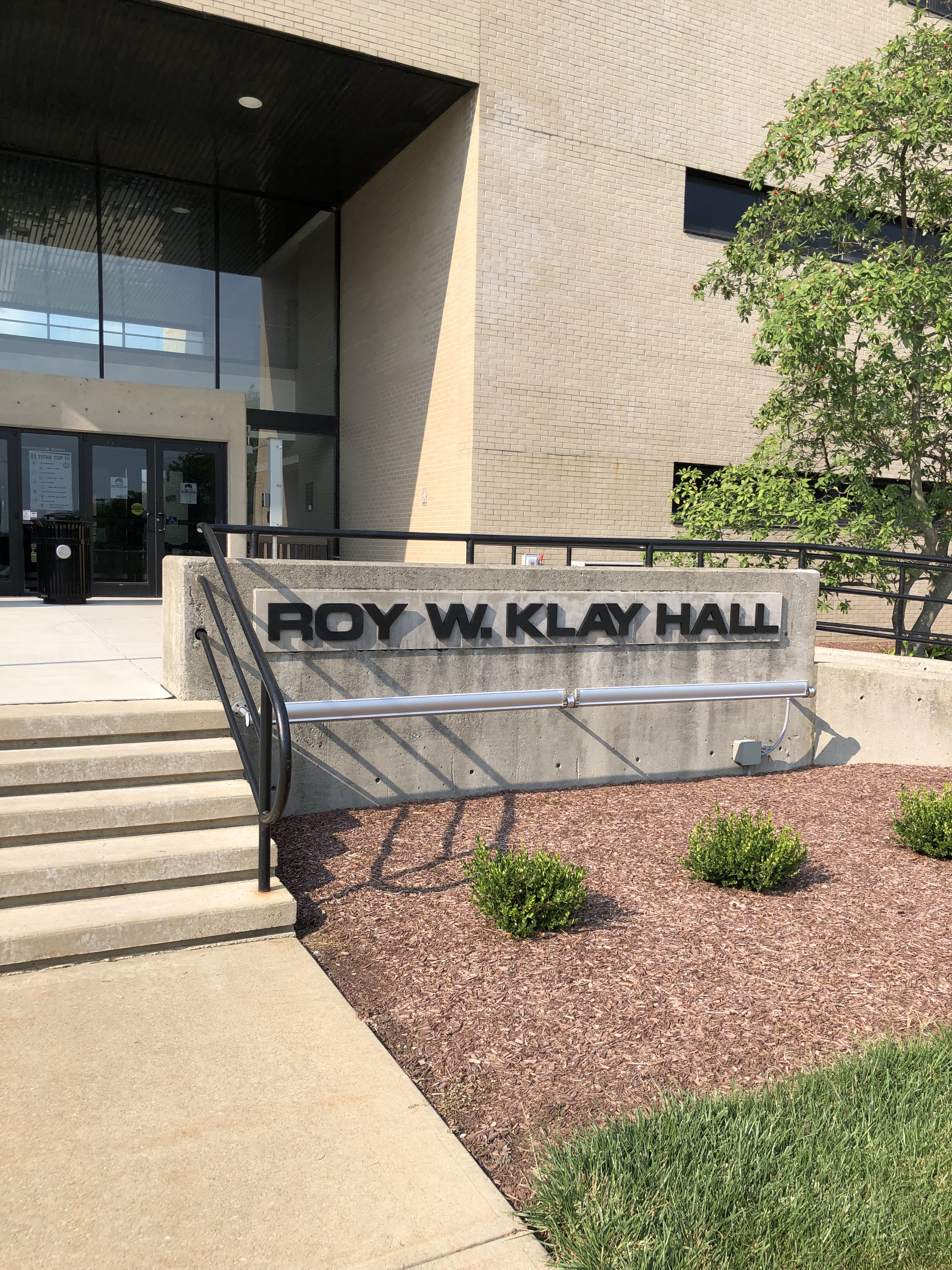
Roy W. Klay Hall

The Terra State Community College campus covers an area of 143 acres (58 ha) in the western edge of Fremont on Napoleon Road.

In the fall of 2018, Terra State became the second community college in Ohio to offer residential housing. The first dorm, The Landings, cost 19.6 million dollars, and had a capacity to house 225 students with 93,445 square feet of space. The addition of on-campus housing contributed to an increase in enrollment and expanded opportunities for students to participate in campus activities. Although a majority of Terra State students do not live on campus, the college offers a variety of events, activities, and student organizations intended to provide opportunities for social and extracurricular involvement. Rather than being primarily associated with a traditional residential or party-school atmosphere, Terra State's campus life has placed an emphasis on organized student events and activities, with the Student Government Association playing a major role in student involvement and campus life.

In the fall of 2019 Terra State began work with the Sandusky County Parks District to connect their campus with the North Coast Inland Bike Trail, and by extension Fremont.

In fall 2019 the college expanded their athletics center. This coincided with the college bringing back their athletics program after a 14-year hiatus.

== Student life ==
Terra State offers a variety of student organizations and extracurricular activities. Organizations provide opportunities for students to participate in leadership, academic recognition, athletics, competitive activities, community service, and social events.

== Athletics ==
The college has intercollegiate teams in the following sports:

- Men's baseball
- Men's basketball
- Men's golf
- Women's basketball
- Women's golf
- Women's soccer
- Women's softball
- Women's volleyball
