= Edison State Community College =

College in Piqua, Ohio, U.S.

Coordinates: 40.1581°N 84.2124°W

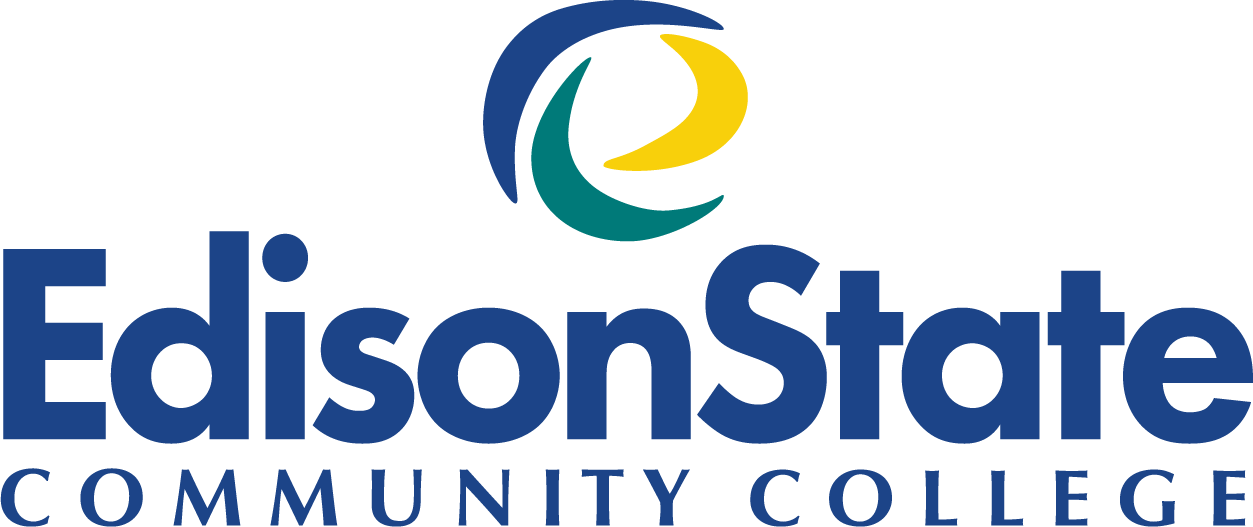
- Type: Public community college
- Established: 1973; 53 years ago
- Parent institution: University System of Ohio
- President: Chris Spradlin
- Students: 4,351
- Location: Piqua, Ohio, U.S.
- Colors: Blue, Gold, and Teal Green
- Nickname: Chargers
- Sporting affiliations: NJCAA; OCCAC
- Website: www.edisonohio.edu

Edison State Community College is a public community college in Piqua, Ohio, United States. It was established as Ohio's first general and technical college in 1973. The college was named after Thomas Alva Edison. The college's main campus is located in Piqua on a 131-acre rural plain with additional campuses in Greenville, Troy, and Eaton.

Edison State Community College currently offers more than one-hundred associate degrees, certificates, and short-term technical certificates and continuing education offerings designed to result in university transfer, career advancement, and workforce development.

== History ==

Edison State Community College was chartered in 1973 under provisions of the Ohio Revised Code as the first general and technical college in Ohio. The college thus emerged without special local taxation as a two-year, public, co-educational, state-supported institution of higher learning. Under its charter, it was authorized to offer studies in the arts and sciences, technical education, and continuing education. By legislative action, the college's name was changed in 1978 from Edison State General and Technical College to Edison State Community College. Today, the college is known as Edison State Community College.

From modest beginnings in a rented facility, the college has grown in stages to its current campus. Its enrollment and offerings have grown steadily during its brief forty-year history, from 309 students enrolled in 30 courses in 1973 to more than 3,000 students enrolled today. Edison State Community College currently offers five different degrees, two of which are designed for transferring to a four-year college or university and three which prepare graduates for immediate employment.

== Regional locations ==
An additional campus was opened in Greenville in the spring of 1979 in response to Edison State's commitment to providing quality education opportunities. Originally housed in a rented facility, the Wagner Avenue location was opened in 2001 and officially became Edison State at Greenville to better reflect the range of student services and enrollment opportunities available to area residents.

== Accreditation ==
Edison State Community College is accredited by the Higher Learning Commission and is recognized with the highest order attainable by the Ohio Board of Regents. The institution is a member of the Strategic Ohio Council for Higher Education (SOCHE).

== Athletics ==
The Edison State Community College athletic teams compete in Region XII as a Division II member of the National Junior College Athletic Association (NJCAA), regularly playing teams in the Midwest. Edison State is also a participating member of the Ohio Community College Athletic Conference (OCCAC).

The Chargers compete at the varsity level in Men's Baseball, Men's Basketball, Women's Basketball, Women's Softball, and Women's Volleyball .

Edison State Community College Athletics was named the recipient of the 2019-2020 and 2021-22 Ohio Community College Athletic Conference (OCCAC) All-Sports Award. In 2020, Edison State was impressive across the board, finishing inside the D-II top-3 for all three sports, including a shared championship for women's basketball led by OCCAC Coach of the Year Tim McMahon. In 2022, Edison State's five athletics programs posted a combined .705 winning percentage (58-24-1) against OCCAC competition, with each team finishing inside the top 3 of their respective league standings. The women's basketball program, guided by OCCAC Coach of the Year Tim McMahon, led the charge by going 14-0 en route to a conference championship.

== Workforce Development and Work-Based Learning ==
The Edison State Office of Workforce Development and Work-Based Learning encompasses apprenticeships, employer resources, industry partnerships, TechCred, and work-based learning. Edison State is a registered apprenticeship sponsor for the State of Ohio.
