= Uzu =

Uzu, UZU or Üzü may refer to:

== Music ==
- UZU, a 2013 album by Yamantaka // Sonic Titan
- Uzu, a 2000 album by Sugar Soul
- "Uzu", a 2003 song by Porno Graffitti from Worldillia

== Other uses ==
- Uzu Hotel, Benghazi, Libya
- Uzu, a Japanese film of 1961
- Uzu Sanageyama, a character in the Japanese anime series Kill La Kill
- Üzü (disambiguation), two villages in Azerbaijan

== See also ==
- Ozu (disambiguation)
- Uzo (disambiguation)
- Yuzu, a fruit
