= Avur =

Avur may refer to:

- Avur, Azerbaijan
- Avur, India
