= Üzü =

Üzü may refer to:

- Çay Üzü - meaning "River Üzü" - Azerbaijan
- Dağ Üzü - meaning "Mountain Üzü" - Azerbaijan
