= Osu =

Osu, OSU or osu can stand for:

== Higher education ==
- Ohio State University, in Columbus, Ohio, United States
- Oklahoma State University, in Stillwater, Oklahoma, United States
- Oregon State University, in Corvallis, Oregon, United States
- Okayama Shoka University, a Japanese private university in Okayama, Japan

== Places ==
- Osu, Accra, a district in Ghana, West Africa
  - Osu Castle
- Ōsu, a district of Nagoya, central Japan
- Ohio State University Airport (IATA: OSU), Columbus, Ohio, United States

== Video games ==
- Osu! Tatakae! Ouendan (series), a series of three rhythm video games for the Nintendo DS console released from 2005 to 2007
  - Osu! Tatakae! Ouendan, a 2005 rhythm game for the Nintendo DS
  - Moero! Nekketsu Rhythm Damashii Osu! Tatakae! Ouendan 2, the game's 2007 sequel
- osu!, a rhythm game first released in 2007 which was inspired by Osu! Tatakae! Ouendan, originally for Windows and later ported to other systems

== Other uses ==
- Old Salt Union, a newgrass band from Illinois
- Operation Straight Up, an evangelical organization that provided Christian-themed entertainment to the United States military
- Order of St. Ursula, a branch of Ursulines (Roman Catholic Christian religious order)
- Osu caste system, a caste system practiced by the Igbo people in West Africa
- Ottawa South United, a Canadian soccer team

== See also ==
- Ozu (disambiguation)
