= AROUSE OSU =

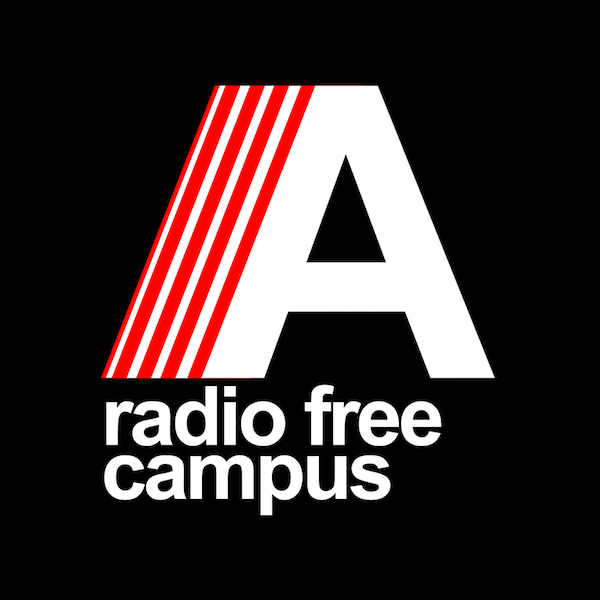
- Columbus, Ohio; United States

Programming
- Language: English
- Format: Freeform, College, Local

Ownership
- Owner: Ohio State University

History
- First air date: 2010

Links
- Webcast: Listen Live
- Website: arouseosu.org

AROUSE OSU is an Internet radio station run by students of Ohio State University, broadcasting exclusively online. AROUSE OSU is overseen by an executive board of Undergraduate students, and faculty from Ohio State University's Department of Comparative Studies. The station's name is a backronym standing for "Amateur Radio Organization for Undergraduate Student Entertainment".

== History ==
Student radio at Ohio State dates back to 1971, when then-WOSR began broadcasting from a mailing address at Drackett Tower. Mark Gunderson of The Evolution Control Committee accounts that the station folded in 1992.

In October 1995, KBUX ("The Underground") began simulcasting on cable TV and 91.5FM. In 1998, the station began streaming online, and continued to do so until February 2001, when the FCC found its signal strength too high. The station continued its television broadcast on UNITS Channel 19 until folding in late 2002.

== AROUSE OSU ==
In 2010, eight years after the fall of The Underground, students banded together to create the Amateur Radio Organization for Undergraduate Student Entertainment: a streaming-only station broadcasting from off-campus space. Without availability of an on-campus studio, the students relied on the generosity of local businesses to maintain broadcasting space.

From 2010 to 2016, AROUSE broadcast from Rendezvous Hair Salon, two miles north of Campus in the Old North district. After the building was struck by lightning, the students moved to the High Street restaurant Buckeye Donuts.

After a brief relocation to Evolved Body Art in SoHud, the station moved back to Buckeye Donuts, where it would broadcast 24/7 due to the restaurant itself being open 24/7. The radio station operated out of the donut shop's basement.

AROUSE currently has over 100 students on the organization roster, and 84 hours of programming each week.

As of 2024, AROUSE broadcasts out of local Columbus Cafe, Casa Cacao. Along with the 24/7 broadcast, Ohio State's student radio also publishes numerous student-written articles on their website, commenting on music, campus life, and culture.

Notable AROUSE guests include Chris Tomson (Vampire Weekend, Dams of the West), James O'Reilly (CEO, Long John Silver's), Ron Gallo, and more.
