= Ohio State University =

Public university in Columbus, Ohio, US

The Ohio State University
- Former names: Ohio Agricultural and Mechanical College (1870–1878)
- Motto: Disciplina in civitatem (Latin)
- Motto in English: "Education for Citizenship"
- Type: Public land-grant research university
- Established: March 22, 1870; 156 years ago
- Parent institution: University System of Ohio
- Accreditation: HLC
- Academic affiliations: AAU; CUMU; ORAU; URA; USU; sea-grant; space-grant
- Endowment: $9.7 billion (2026)
- President: Ravi V. Bellamkonda
- Provost: Trevor Brown (interim)
- Faculty: 7,310
- Administrative staff: 27,158
- Students: 60,046 (Columbus); 65,405 (all campuses)
- Undergraduates: 45,728 (Columbus); 51,078 (all campuses)
- Postgraduates: 14,318 (Columbus); 14,327 (all campuses)
- Location: Columbus, Ohio, United States; 40°0′2″N 83°0′52″W
- Campus: 1,665 acres (7 km^{2}) Total, 16,196 acres (66 km^{2}); Large city
- Other campuses: Lima; Mansfield; Marion; Newark; Wooster; Online
- Newspaper: The Lantern
- Colors: Scarlet and gray
- Nickname: Buckeyes
- Sporting affiliations: NCAA Division I FBS – Big Ten; WCHA; PRC; MIVA; ORCC
- Mascot: Brutus Buckeye
- Website: osu.edu

The Ohio State University (Ohio State, tOSU, or OSU) is a public research university in Columbus, Ohio, United States. Founded in 1870, it is the flagship institution of the University System of Ohio. It is designated a land-grant, sea-grant, and space-grant university by the government of Ohio.

Ohio State is one of the largest universities by enrollment in the United States, with over 50,000 undergraduate students and 15,000 graduate students. Ohio State is a member of the Association of American Universities and is classified among "R1: Doctoral Universities – Very high research activity spending and doctorate production". In 2026 the university had research and development (R&D) expenditures of $1.58 billion, the 12th largest in the United States.

The university consists of sixteen colleges, including of Arts and Sciences, Business, Dentistry, Engineering, Public Affairs, and Law, and offers study in a wide range of degree programs at the undergraduate and graduate levels. It has five satellite campuses in Lima, Mansfield, Marion, Newark, and Wooster. Its athletic teams compete in NCAA Division I within the Big Ten Conference for the large majority of sports. (Note: It competes in the Big Ten Conference for all sports outside of the Western Collegiate Hockey Association for women's ice hockey.)

Alumni and faculty include 6 Nobel Prize laureates, 9 Rhodes Scholars, 7 Churchill Scholars, 1 Fields Medalist, 8 Pulitzer Prize winners, 77 Goldwater scholars, 1 U.S. vice president, 7 U.S. senators, 15 U.S. representatives, and 118 Olympic medalists.

== History ==
=== 19th century ===
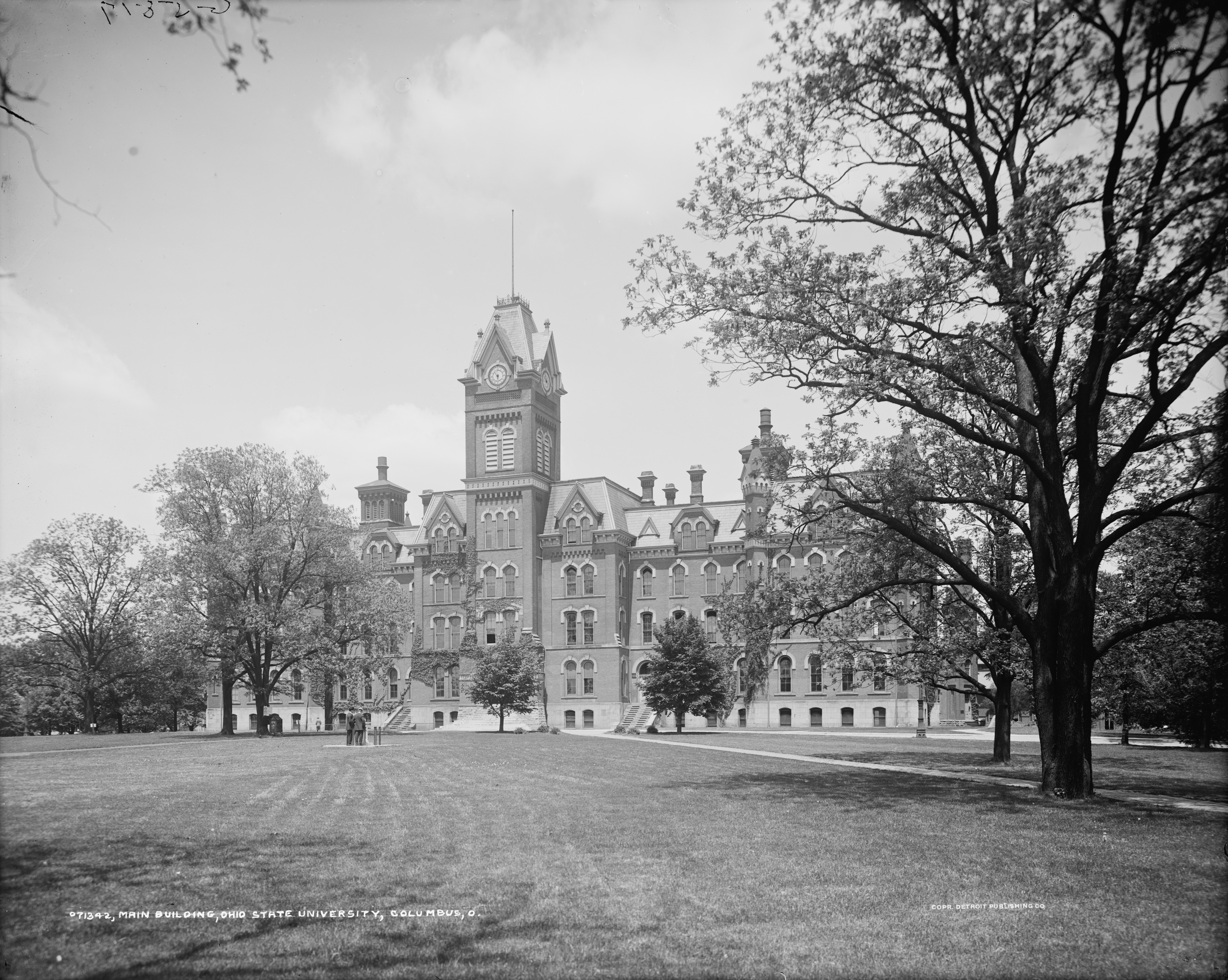
University Hall was the first building on campus, built in 1873 and reconstructed in 1976.

The university was established in 1870 as a land-grant university named Ohio Agricultural and Mechanical College. The proposal of a manufacturing and agriculture university in central Ohio was initially met in the 1870s with hostility from the state's agricultural interests, and with competition for resources from Ohio University and Miami University. The university opened its doors to 24 students on September 17, 1873. In 1878, the first class of six men graduated. The first woman graduated the following year. Also in 1878, the Ohio legislature recognized an expanded scope for the university by changing its name to "the Ohio State University".

=== 20th century ===
In 1906, Ohio State president and segregationist William Oxley Thompson, along with the university's supporters in the state legislature, put forth the Lybarger Bill with the aim of shifting virtually all higher education support to the continued development of Ohio State while funding only the "normal school" functions of the state's other public universities. Although the Lybarger Bill failed narrowly to gain passage, in its place the Eagleson Bill was passed as a compromise, which determined that all doctoral education and research functions would be the role of Ohio State, and that Miami University and Ohio University would not offer instruction beyond the master's degree level – an agreement that would remain in place until the 1950s. In 1916, Ohio State was elected into membership in the Association of American Universities.

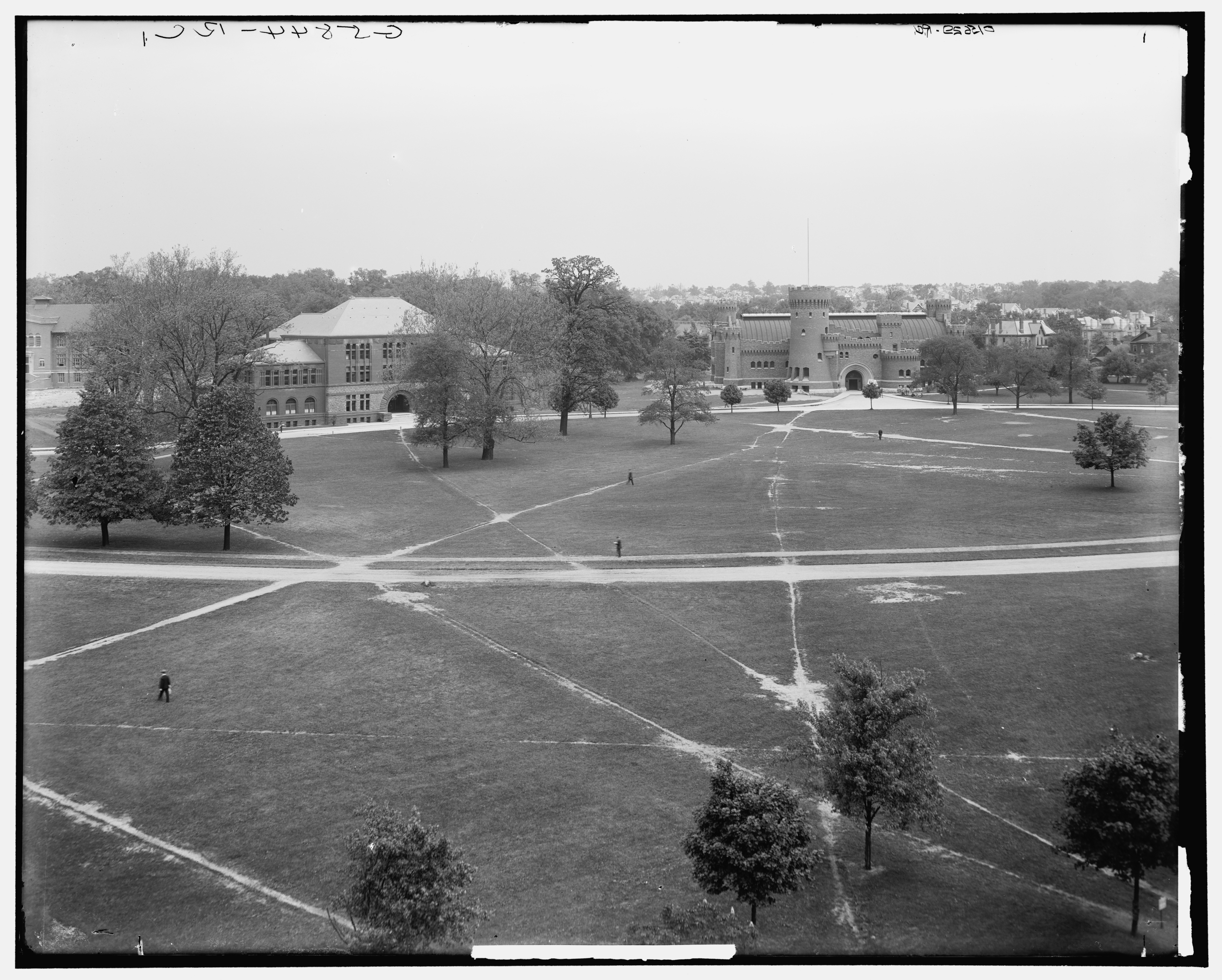
A view of The Oval green space in the early 20th century

With the onset of the Great Depression, Ohio State would face many of the challenges affecting universities throughout America as budget support was slashed, and students without the means of paying tuition returned home to support families. By the mid-1930s, however, enrollment had stabilized due in large part to the role of the Federal Emergency Relief Administration and later the National Youth Administration. By the end of the decade, enrollment had still managed to grow to over 17,500. In 1934, the Ohio State Research Foundation was founded to bring in outside funding for faculty research projects. In 1938, a development office was opened to begin raising funds privately to offset reductions in state support. In 1952, Ohio State founded the interdisciplinary Mershon Center for International Security Studies, which it still houses. In 1986, Ohio State ended its historic open enrollment policy and moved towards selective admissions.

The university jointed several other grants in the late 1980s. It was designated a space-grant institution in 1988. It was designated a sea-grant institution one year later, in 1989.

=== 21st century ===
In 2020, Kristina M. Johnson took office as the 16th president. Her tenure was marked by the university incorporating various diversity, equity, and inclusion policies, which led to criticism from conservatives.

In 2023, there was a power struggle between Johnson and Les Wexner, a billionaire and close affiliate of Jeffrey Epstein. Wexner was formerly a member of the OSU board of trustees and some sources claim his exertion of political influence over the board of trustees caused the power struggle. Shortly after, Johnson resigned from her role.

In 2023, Walter E. Carter Jr. took office as the 17th president. His tenure has been described as more conservative than Johnson's, rolling back many of her perceived progressive policies. His appointment was the result of a power struggle between Johnson and Les Wexner, a billionaire and close affiliate of Jeffrey Epstein who has significant influence on the board of trustees.

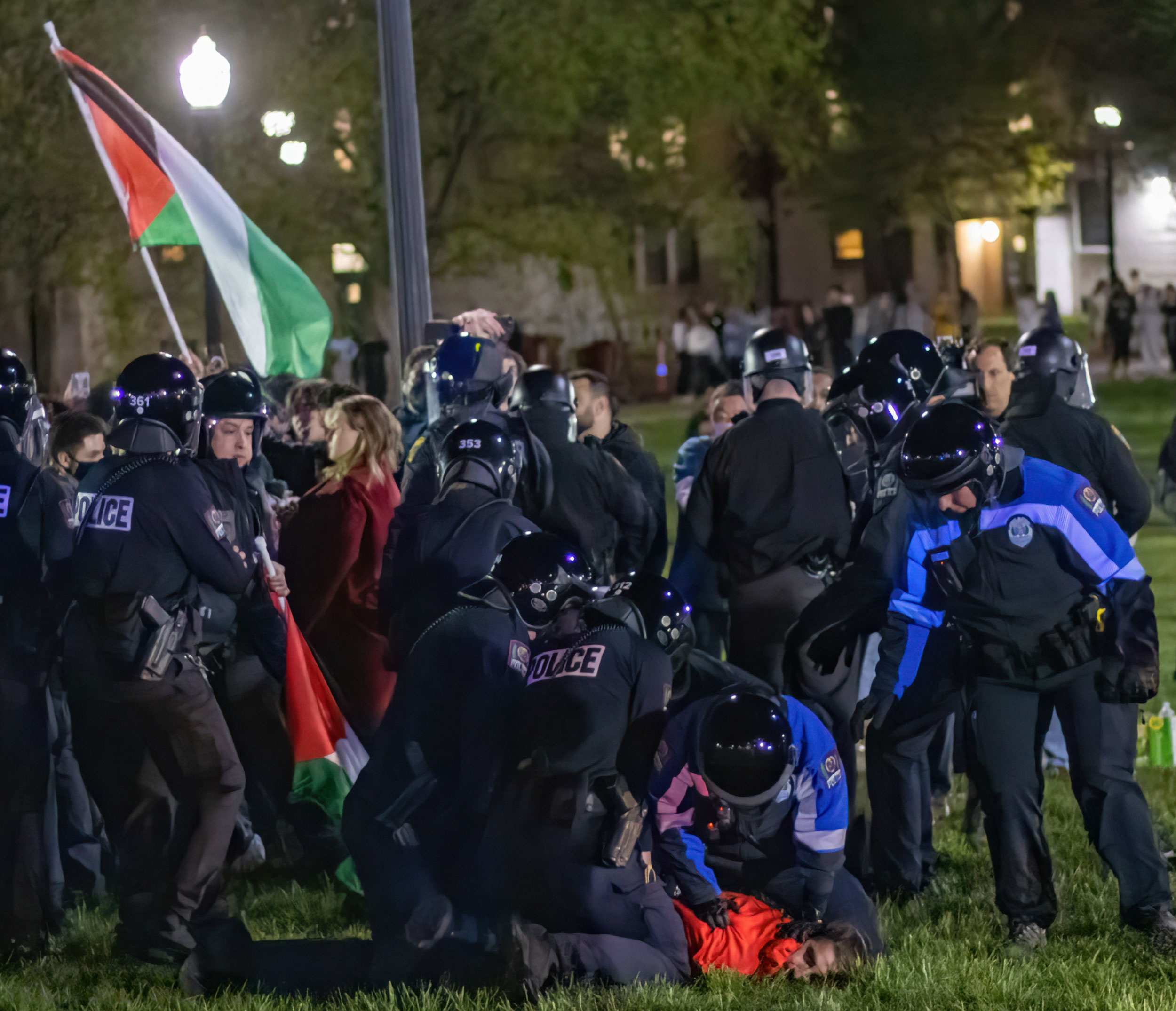
Officers arresting pro-Palestinian protester at the Gaza Solidarity Encampment

A series of protests at Ohio State University by pro-Palestinian demonstrators are ongoing and began on-campus following the outbreak of the Gaza war and genocide. A solidarity encampment was constructed on OSU's South Oval on April 25, 2024 in solidarity with the Columbia University encampment. Riot police then made 36 arrests against student protesters — the largest mass arrests in campus history since the 1969–1970 Vietnam War protests.

The protester demands of OSU include "financial divestment, academic boycott, financial disclosure, acknowledging the genocide, and ending targeted policing".

Pro-Palestinian groups have been critical of the university's responses to the protests, which have included allowing state troopers to aim sniper rifles at students during the dispersal of the Gaza Solidarity Encampment, suspending a pro-Palestinian student organization, and blocking the Undergraduate Student Government's attempts at passing legislation for financial divestment from Israel after receiving pressure from officials in Zionist organization Hillel International.

Following protests, the OSU administration coordinated multi-agency police operations, implemented a campus-wide chalking ban, and expelled pro-Palestinian social media influencer Guy Christensen; state-level officials floated invoking a 1953 anti-KKK statute against pro-Palestinian protesters who wore face coverings, suggested terminating faculty members who encourage or engage in "violence on campus", and passed the "CAMPUS" Act to formalize free speech restrictions; and officials in the Trump administration revoked the student visa of at least one pro-Palestinian protester at OSU and threatened to withdraw funding from OSU if they did not sufficiently "combat antisemitism" on campus. These actions have been met with multiple lawsuits over alleged violations of First and Fourteenth Amendment rights.

The university has insisted their actions are politically neutral, with OSU President Ted Carter stating the "university's long-standing space rules are content neutral and are enforced uniformly". Critics argue the university engages in selective enforcement of university space rules, enforcing policies disproportionately against pro-Palestinian groups and not similarly against other groups on campus.

Along with other public universities in the state, DEI policies were banned in 2025 with the Advance Ohio Higher Education Act, which passed the Ohio State legislature and was signed by governor Mike DeWine. In 2026, the university's expulsion of Guy Christensen for criticism of the Gaza genocide was ruled by a federal judge as a "likely violation" of the student's First Amendment rights. Scholars at Risk noted "a chilling effect on academic freedom" in 2024 due to political interference from the university's board of trustees and the state government.

In January 2025, the defense technology company Anduril Industries announced a hyperscaling computer facilities for autonomous sensors and weapons that has been noted for its close ties with Ohio State University and its administration, with the company sponsoring the football program and many of Anduril's employees hailing from the applied science programs at the university.

On March 8, 2026, Carter resigned, after admitting to an "inappropriate relationship", marking a continuation of abrupt departures and controversy at the university Protests against Les Wexner's influence and relationship with the university are ongoing.

In April 2026, The New York Times published an article about OSU named A Football School Striving to Be More Keeps Dropping the Ball, with the opening sentence "Ohio State isn’t the only university in turmoil, but few others have faced so many issues lately."

== Campuses ==
=== Main (Columbus) ===
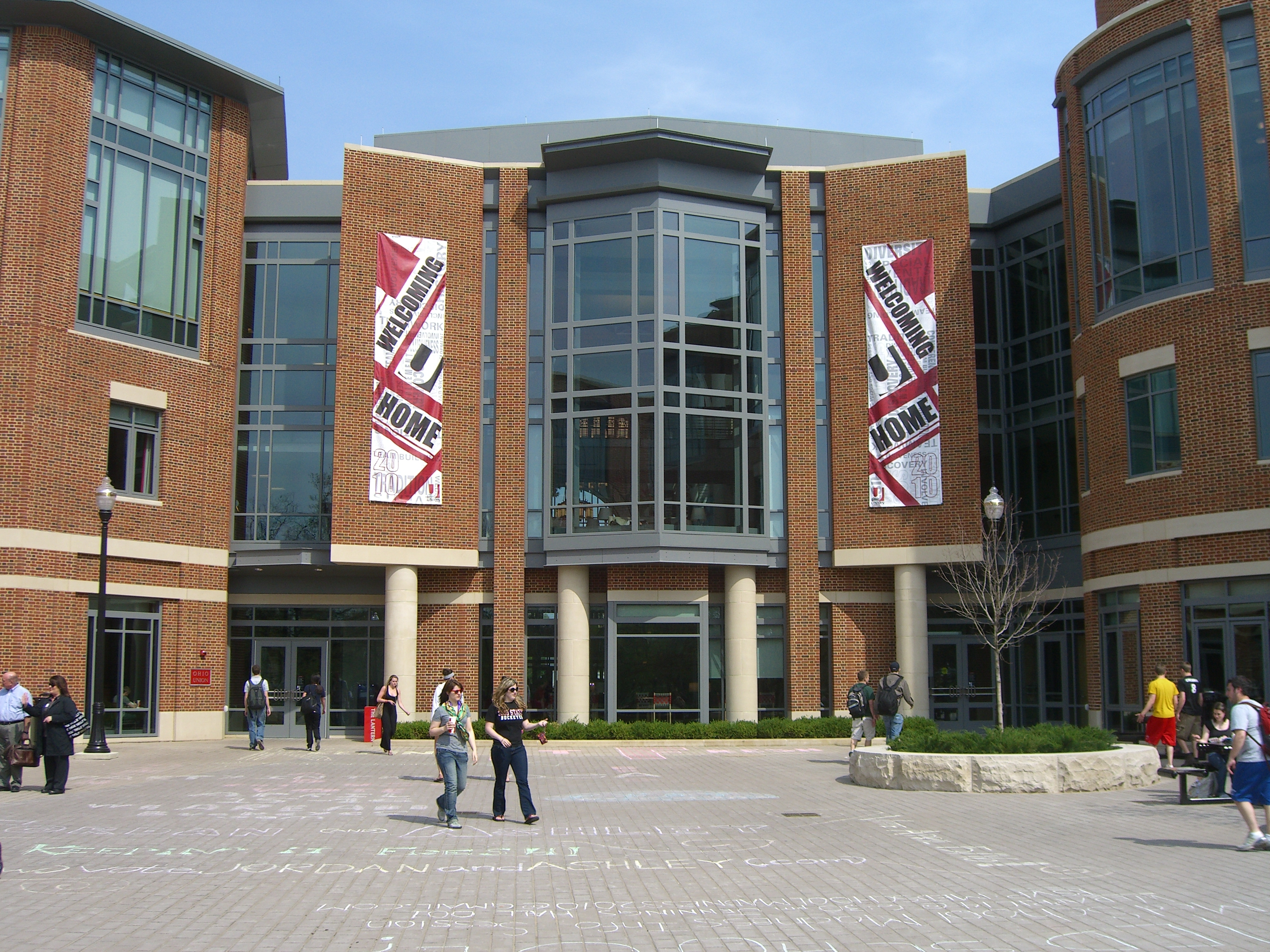
The Ohio Union was the first student union at a state university in the United States.

Ohio State's 1,764-acre (7.14 km^{2}) main campus is about 2.5 miles (4.0 km) north of Columbus' downtown. The historical center of campus is the Oval, a quad of about 11 acres (4.5 ha). The original campus was laid out in the English country style with University Hall overlooking what would become the Oval. From 1905 to 1913, the Olmsted brothers, who had designed New York City's Central Park, were contracted as architectural consultants. Under their leadership, a more formal landscape plan was created with its center axis through the Oval. This axis shifted the university's street grid 12.25 degrees from the City of Columbus' street grid. Construction of the main library in 1915 reinforced this grid shift.

Ohio State's research library system has a combined collection of over 5.8 million volumes. Along with 21 libraries on its Columbus campus, the university has eight branches at off-campus research facilities and regional campuses, and a book storage depository near campus. In all, the Ohio State library system encompasses 55 branches and specialty collections. Some more significant collections include the Byrd Polar Research Center Archival Program, which has the archives of Admiral Richard E. Byrd and other polar research materials; the Hilandar Research Library, which has the world's largest collection of medieval Slavic manuscripts on microform; the Ohio State Cartoon Library & Museum, the world's largest repository of original cartoons; the Lawrence and Lee Theatre Research Institute.

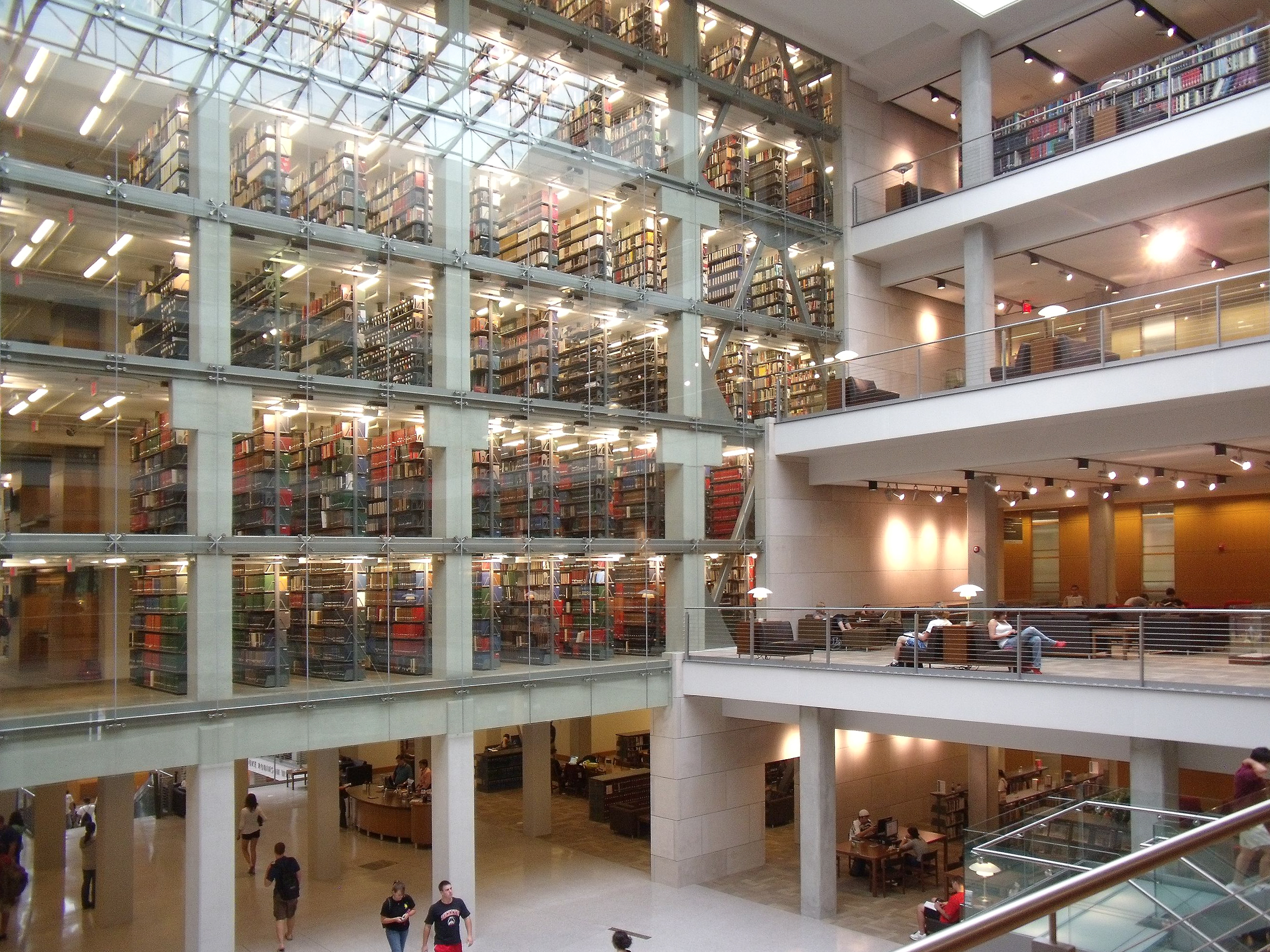
The East Atrium at the William Oxley Thompson Memorial Library

And the archives of Senator John Glenn Anchoring the traditional campus gateway at the eastern end of the Oval is the 1989 Wexner Center for the Arts. Designed by architects Peter Eisenman of New York and Richard Trott of Columbus, the center was funded in large part by Ohio State alumnus Les Wexner's gift of $25 million in the 1980s. The center was founded to encompass all aspects of visual and performing arts with a focus on new commissions and artist residencies. Part of its design was to pay tribute to the armory that formerly had the same location. Its groundbreaking deconstructivist architecture has resulted in it being lauded as one of the most important buildings of its generation. Its design has also been criticized as proving less than ideal for many of the art installations it has attempted to display. The centerpiece of the Wexner Center's permanent collection is Picasso's Nude on a Black Armchair, which was purchased by Wexner at auction for $45 million.

To the south of the Oval is another, somewhat smaller expanse of green space commonly referred to as the South Oval. At its eastern end, it is anchored by the Ohio Union. To the west are Hale Hall, the Kuhn Honors House, Browning Amphitheatre (a traditional stone Greek theatre) and Mirror Lake. Knowlton Hall, dedicated in October 2004, is at the corner of West Woodruff Avenue and Tuttle Park Place, next to Ohio Stadium.

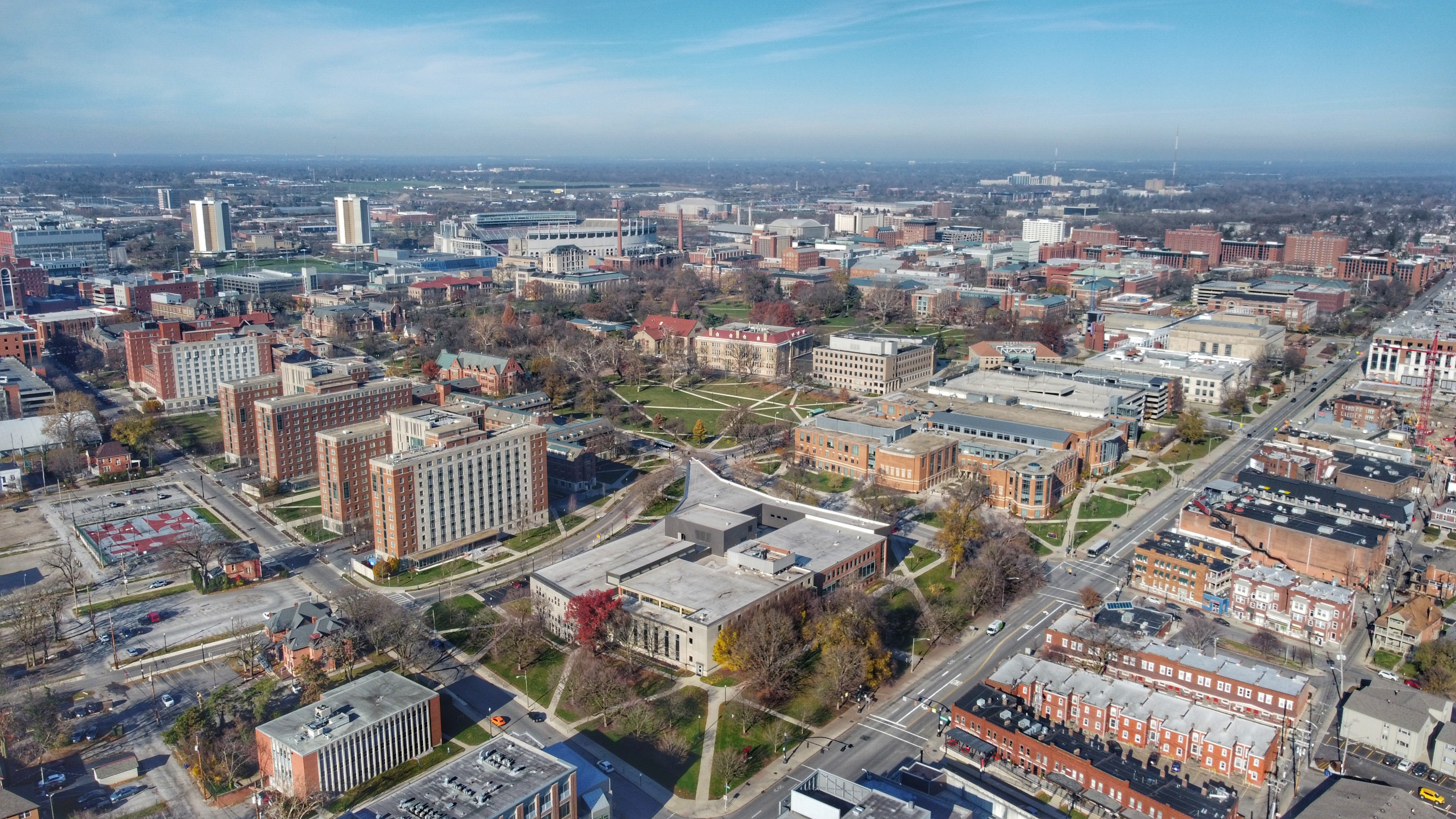
Aerial view of the main campus, with Drinko Hall and the South Oval in the foreground

Knowlton Hall along with the Fisher College of Business and Hitchcock Hall form an academic nucleus in the northwestern corner of North campus. Knowlton Hall was designed by Atlanta-based Mack Scogin Merrill Elam along with WSA Studio from Columbus. The Hall is home to the KSA Café, the disciplines of architecture, landscape architecture, city and regional planning, and about 550 undergraduate and graduate students. Knowlton Hall stands out from the general reddish-brown brick of Ohio State's campus with distinctive white marble tiles that cover the building's exterior. This unique wall cladding was requested by Austin E. Knowlton, the namesake of and main patron to the creation of Knowlton Hall. Knowlton also requested that five white marble columns be erected on the site, each column representing one of the classical orders of architecture.

The campus is served by the Campus Area Bus Service.

=== Regional campuses ===
Ohio State has five satellite campuses across Ohio.

==== Lima ====
The Ohio State University at Lima is a satellite campus in Lima, Ohio, founded in 1960. The Lima Campus Library has 76,000 volumes and 200+ journal subscriptions. Library databases also provide access to thousands of online journals. The university shares its campus with Rhodes State College.

==== Mansfield ====
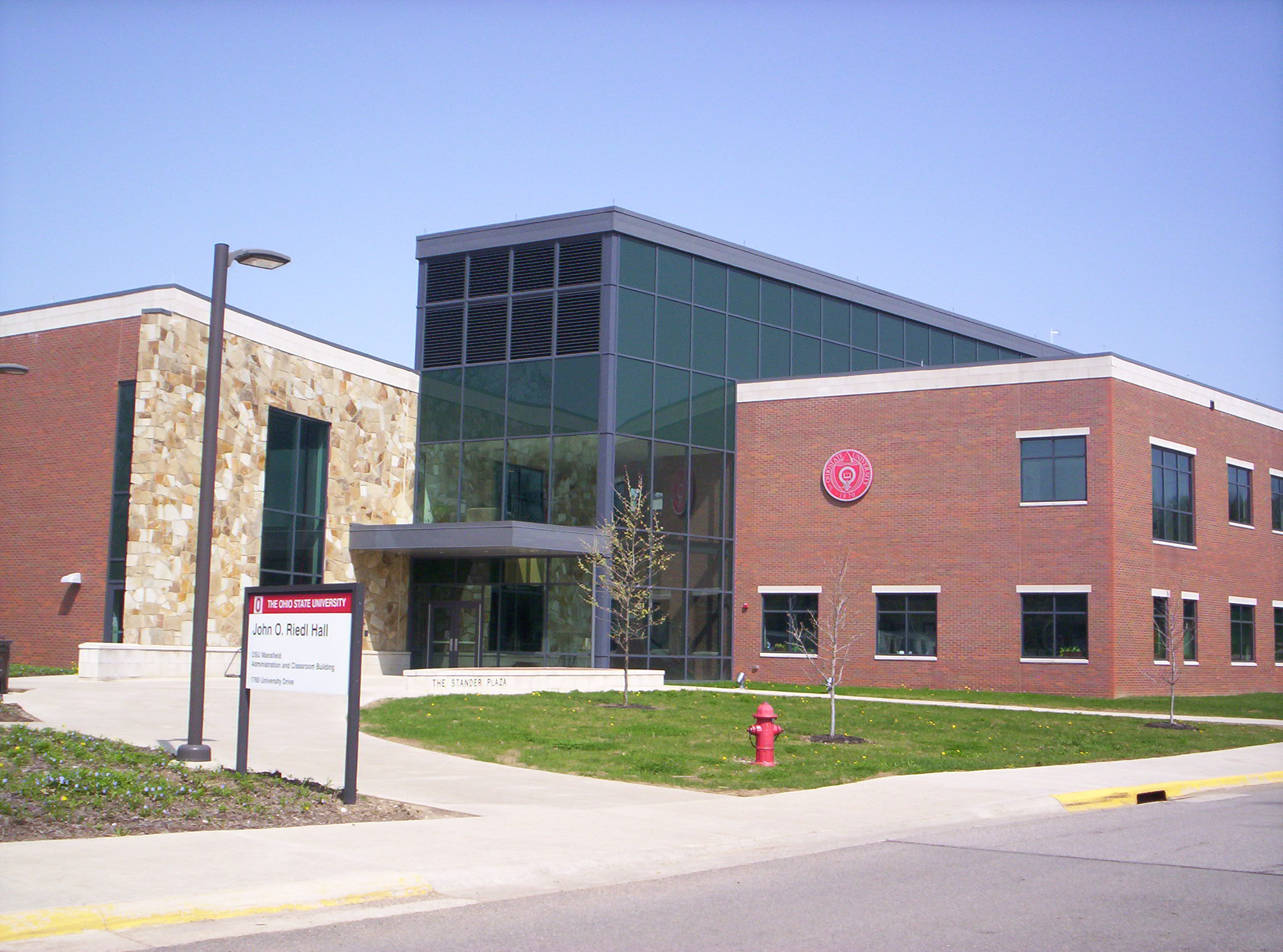
Riedl Hall at tOSU Mansfield

The Ohio State University at Mansfield is a satellite campus in Mansfield, Ohio, founded in 1958. It was created through a partnership between Mansfield-area citizens and the state of Ohio. Soon after the Ohio Board of Regents designated Mansfield as the site for an Ohio State regional campus, Mansfield-area citizens mounted a major campaign to acquire land for the campus. The university shares its campus with North Central State College.

==== Marion ====
The Ohio State University at Marion is a satellite campus in Marion, Ohio. The campus was founded in 1957. Its 187-acre (0.76 km^{2}) campus is located 45 miles (72 km) north of Columbus and is shared with Marion Technical College. There are eight buildings on the campus.

==== Newark ====
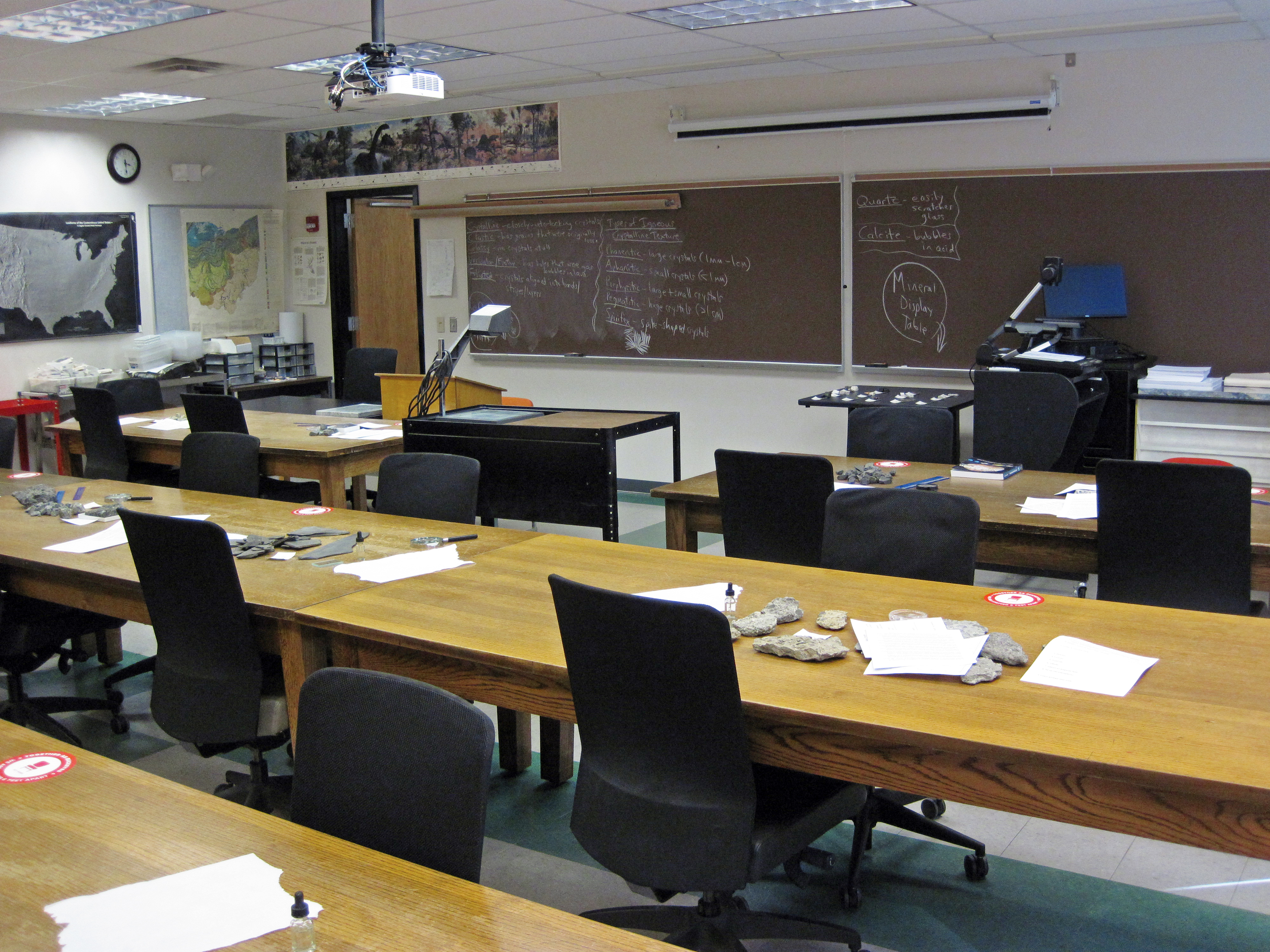
Classroom at tOSU Newark

The Ohio State University at Newark is a satellite campus in Newark, Ohio. During its early years, classes were held at old Newark High School. In 1966, over one million dollars pledged by 7,000 local citizens to match funds from the state legislature supported the cost of buying 155 acres (0.63 km^{2}) of land and constructing the first building, Founders Hall, which opened in 1968. The university campus shares its campus with Central Ohio Technical College.

==== Wooster ====
The Ohio State University Agricultural Technical Institute in Wooster, Ohio, was established in 1969. It specifically grants associate degrees in agriculture and related sciences from the university's College of Food, Agricultural, and Environmental Sciences.

== Organization and administration ==
=== Governance ===
Ohio State is overseen by a 15-member board of trustees appointed by the governor of Ohio. The university's governance system has been criticized for centralizing power in unaccountable institutions and limiting freedom of expression.

The free speech organization Foundation for Individual Rights and Expression released a ranking in September 2025, giving OSU a 57.7 out of 100 (an 'F' grade) in free speech.

=== Endowment ===
Ohio State was among the first group of four public universities to raise a $1 billion endowment when it passed $1 billion in 1999. At the end of 2005, Ohio State's endowment stood at $1.73 billion, ranking it seventh among public universities and 27th among all American universities. In June 2006, the endowment passed the $2 billion mark.

In recent decades, and in response to continually shrinking state funding, Ohio State has conducted two significant multi-year fundraising campaigns. The first concluded in 1987 and raised $460 million, a record at the time for a public university. The "Affirm Thy Friendship Campaign" took place between 1995 and 2000. With an initial goal of raising $850 million, the campaign's final tally was $1.23 billion, placing Ohio State among the small group of public universities to have successfully conducted a $1 billion campaign. At his welcoming ceremony, returning President E. Gordon Gee announced in the fall of 2007 that Ohio State would launch a $2.5 billion fundraising campaign. In 2019, celebrating the university's 150th year, president Michael V. Drake announced the "Time and Change Campaign" with a goal of raising $4.5 billion from 1 million individual donors.

== Academics ==
Ohio State is the flagship university of the University System of Ohio. Its political science department is a major department in the field. It also has notable applied science programs.

According to the National Science Foundation, in 2026 the university had research and development (R&D) expenditures of $1.58 billion, ranking it 12th in the nation.

=== Undergraduate admissions ===
Admissions to Ohio State are considered highly selective.

Undergraduate admissions statistics
- 2026 entering class
- Admit rate: 43.5 (▼ −23.1)

Test scores middle 50%
- SAT Total: 1360–1500
- ACT Composite: 29–34

In the Autumn 2025 admissions period, the middle 50 percent of composite scores for the SAT was 1360 to 1500. The composite scores for the ACT were 29 to 34.

For the enrolled Spring 2025 class, Ohio State accepted 38,532 students out of 88,508 total for an approximate admission rate of 43.5%. OSU's freshman retention rate was 93.9% between 2021 and 2022, with 88% going on to graduate within six years.

=== Rankings and recognition ===
Academic rankings

National
- Forbes: 72
- U.S. News & World Report: 41
- Washington Monthly: 68
- WSJ/College Pulse: 99

Global
- ARWU: 82
- QS: 190
- THE: 108
- U.S. News & World Report: 66 (tie)

Ohio State is consistently ranked among the best public universities in the United States by major college and university rankings.

In 2026, the university was ranked by Time the 5th best public university in the United States and 33rd globally. Similarly in its 2026 edition, U.S. News & World Report ranked Ohio State as 15th overall among public and 41st among all national universities. In 2026, the Center for World University Rankings ranked Ohio State 29th nationally and 55th out of 21,462 universities globally. The Academic Ranking of World Universities placed Ohio State 39–51 nationally and 82nd globally for 2023. Times Higher Education World University Rankings ranks it 108th in the world. In 2024, QS World University Rankings ranked the university 151st in the world.

In 1916, Ohio State became the first university in Ohio to be extended membership into the Association of American Universities, and remains the only public university in Ohio among the organization's 60 members. Bloomberg Businessweek ranked the undergraduate business program at Ohio State's Fisher College of Business as the 14th best in the nation in its 2016 rankings.

=== Influential and notable departments ===
In 2023, U.S. News & World Report ranked the college's political science, audiology, sociology, speech–language pathology, finance, accounting, public affairs, nursing, social work, healthcare administration, and pharmacy programs as among the top 20 programs in the country.

==== Artificial intelligence, computer science ====
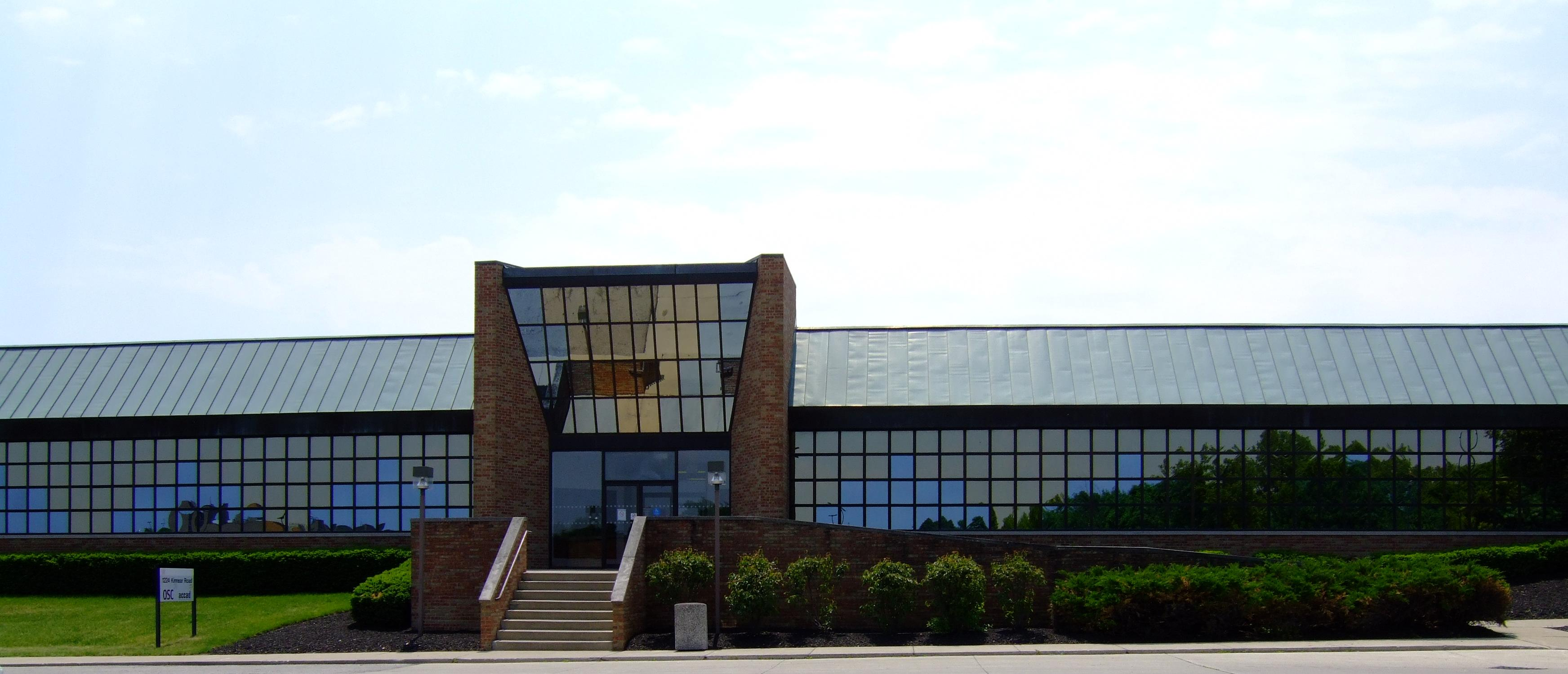
Ohio Supercomputer Center

The university has obtained "national and geopolitical significance" during the 2020s Artificial Intelligence Cold War between the United States and China in generative AI.

The Ohio Supercomputer Center (OSC) is a supercomputer facility located on the western end of the campus. Established in 1987, it partners with universities, labs and industries, providing high performance computing, cyberinfrastructure, research and computational science education services. In 2023, the university announced that it had obtained four H100 NVIDIA GPUs's for AI training at OSC, with a goal of continuous hyperscaling of advanced AI chips for the long term future. By early 2024, Ohio State had added 128 H100 into a new "Cardinal" supercomputing cluster across 32 nodes. The ongoing additions have made the OSC one of the most powerful academic supercomputers.

In June 2025, the university became the first in the world to require all future students to take courses in artificial intelligence. In November of that same year, the university announced it would hire 100 tenure-track faculty with expertise in artificial intelligence (particularly in the fields of generative AI, large language models, machine learning, and deep learning) between then and 2030.

===== Wow! Signal =====
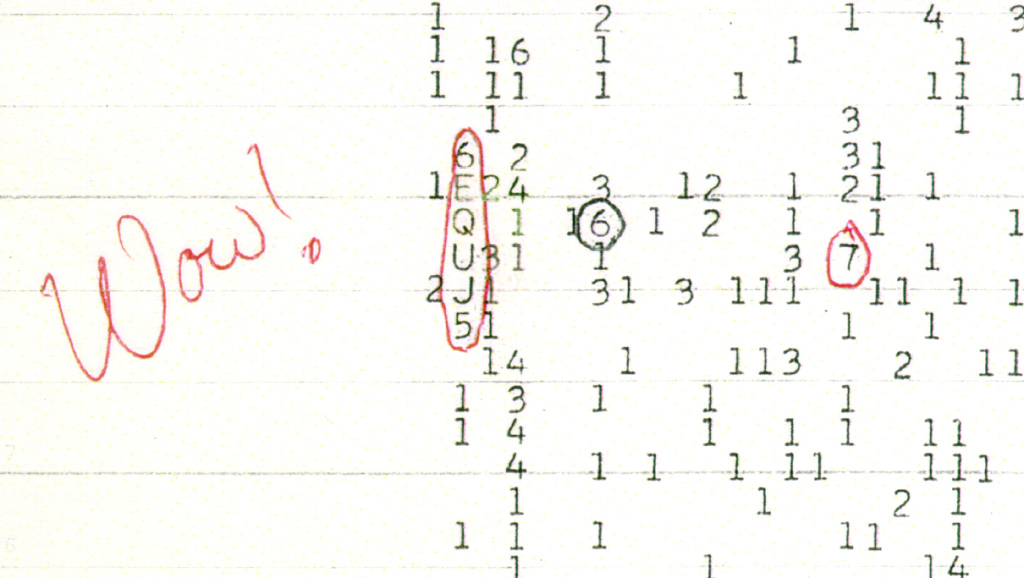
The Wow! signal represented as "6EQUJ5". The original printout with Ehman's handwritten exclamation is preserved by Ohio History Connection.

The Wow! signal was a strong narrowband radio signal detected on August 15, 1977, by Ohio State University's Big Ear radio telescope in Delaware, Ohio, then used to support the search for extraterrestrial intelligence. The signal appeared to come from the direction of the constellation Sagittarius and bore expected hallmarks of extraterrestrial origin.

The "Wow! Signal" is considered by scientists to be one of the few compelling candidates for an intentional extraterrestrial radio transmission ever detected. Despite numerous follow-up searches and hypotheses, the signal has never recurred, and no explanation, terrestrial or otherwise, has been confirmed. While some researchers have suggested it could represent an extraterrestrial transmission, its single occurrence and lack of replication limit the strength of this interpretation. The Wow! signal has inspired SETI targeted searches, scientific discussion about rare astrophysical phenomena, and references in popular culture.

==== Biomedical research ====
The university is a prominent force in biomedical research. The Ohio State College of Medicine is on the southern edge of the central campus. It is home to the James Cancer Hospital, a cancer research institute and one of the National Cancer Institute's 41 comprehensive cancer centers, along with the Richard M. Ross Heart Hospital, a research institute for cardiovascular disease.

==== Engineering ====
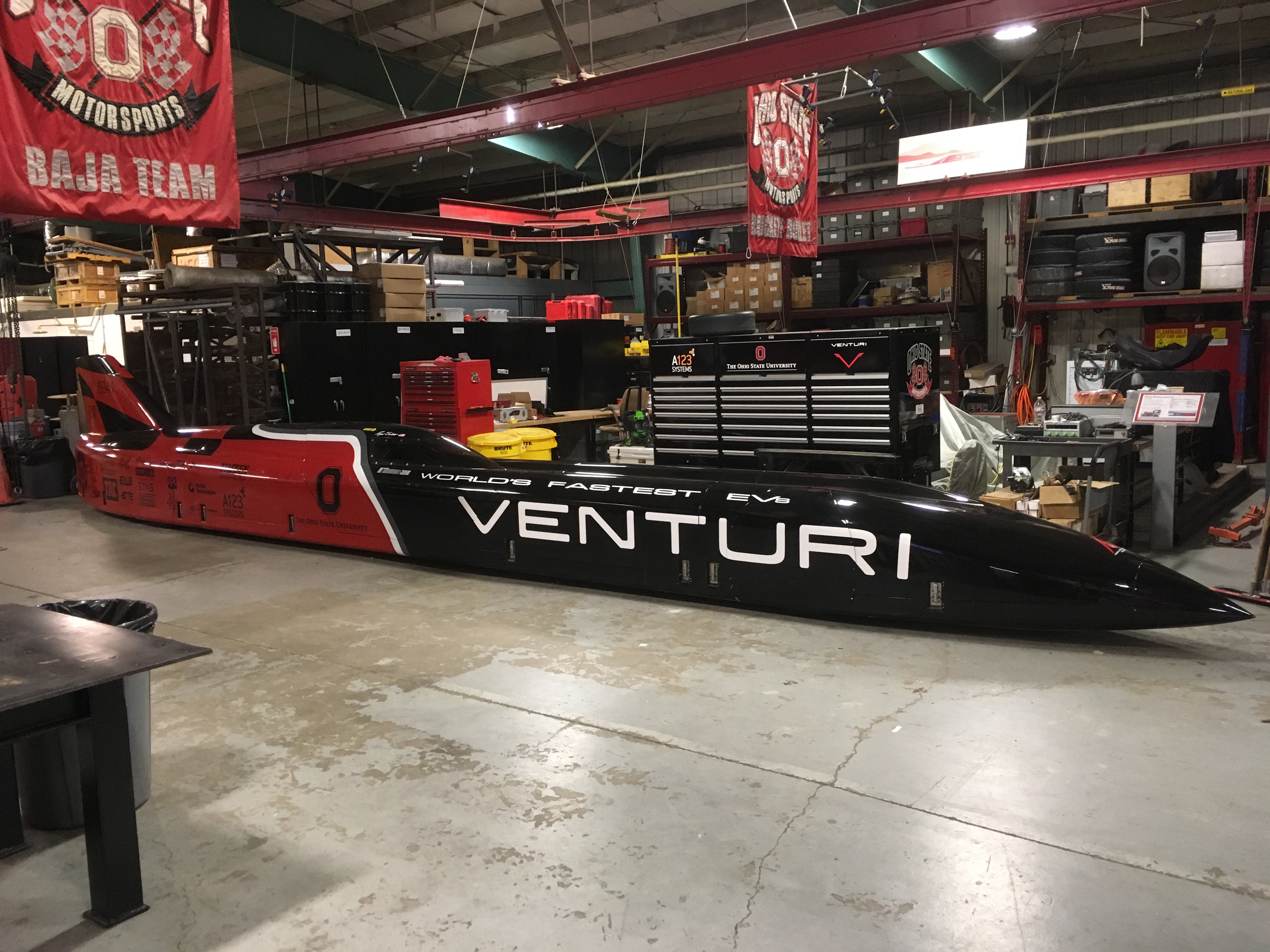
Buckeye Bullet 3 in February 2017

Ohio State's "Buckeye Bullet" electric car broke the world record for the fastest speed by an electric vehicle on October 3, 2004, with a maximum speed of 271.737 mph (437.318 km/h) at the Bonneville Salt Flats in Utah. The vehicle also holds the U.S. record for fastest electric vehicle with a speed of 314.958 mph (506.876 km/h), and peak timed mile speed of 321.834 mph (517.942 km/h). A team of engineering students from the university's "Center for Automotive Research-Intelligent Transportation" (CAR-IT) designed, built and managed the vehicle. In 2007, Buckeye Bullet 2 was launched. This follow-up effort was a collaboration between Ohio State engineering students and engineers from the Ford Motor Company broke the land speed record once again in 2016. On September 19, 2016, the Buckeye Bullet 3 achieved a new world record with a speed of 341.4 mph (549.4 km/h), beating its own previous record of 308 mph (496 km/h). Roger Schroer was the driver for the record breaking run.

=== Research ===
OSU colleges and schools
College of Dentistry
College of Education and Human Ecology
College of Engineering
College of Food, Agricultural, and Environmental Sciences
College of Medicine
College of Nursing
College of Optometry
College of Pharmacy
College of Public Health
College of Social Work
College of Veterinary Medicine
College of Arts and Sciences
Graduate School
John Glenn College of Public Affairs
Max M. Fisher College of Business
Moritz College of Law

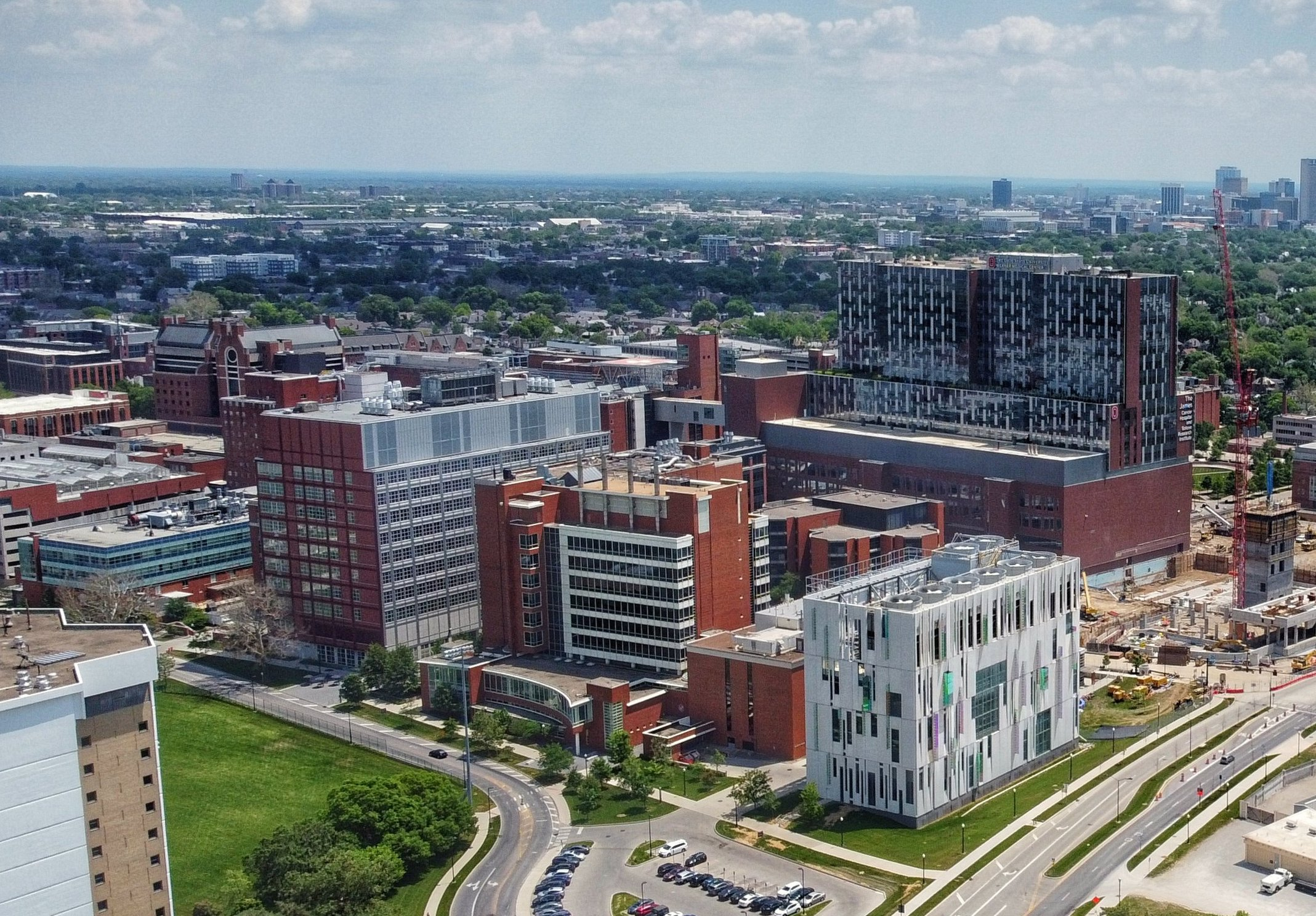
The Wexner Medical Center campus

The National Science Foundation ranked Ohio State University 12th in 2026 among American universities for research and development expenditures with $1.58 billion.

In 2021, President Kristina M. Johnson announced the university would invest at least $750 million over the next 10 years toward research and researchers. This was announced in conjunction with Ohio State's new Innovation District, which will be an interdisciplinary research facility and act as a hub for healthcare and technology research, serving Ohio State faculty and students as well as public and private partners. Construction of the facility was completed in 2023, as one of the first buildings in the District.

Research facilities include Aeronautical/Astronautical Research Laboratory, Byrd Polar Research Center, Center for Automotive Research, (OSU CAR), Chadwick Arboretum, Biomedical Research Tower, Biological Sciences Building, CDME, Comprehensive Cancer Center, David Heart and Lung Research Institute, Electroscience Laboratory, Large Binocular Telescope (LBT, originally named the Columbus Project), Mershon Center for International Security Studies, Museum of Biological Diversity, National Center for the Middle Market, Stone Laboratory on Gibraltar Island, Center for Urban and Regional Analysis and Ohio Agricultural Research and Development Center.

Ohio State is a founding member of the Association of Universities for Research in Astronomy (AURA), a consortium of universities and other institutions that operates astronomical observatories and telescopes.

== Student life ==
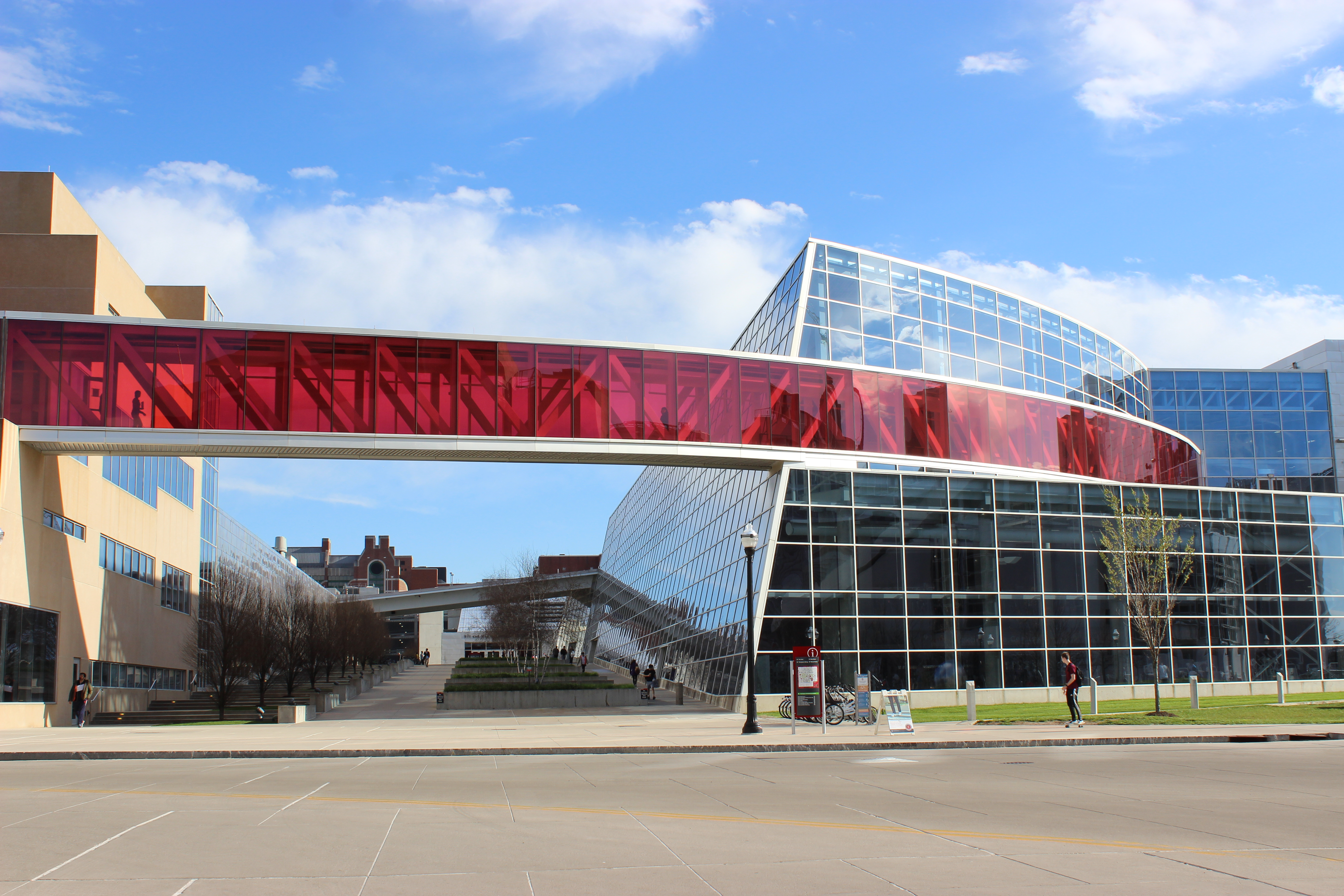
The Recreation and Physical Activity Center and Scarlet Skyway

The Office of Student Life has partnership affiliations with the Schottenstein Center, the Blackwell Inn and the Drake Events Center. Services supporting student wellness include the Wilce Student Health Center, named for university physician John Wilce, the Mary A. Daniels Student Wellness Center and the Counseling and Consultation Service.

The RPAC is the main recreational facility on campus. The Wellness Center within the RPAC offers services such as nutrition counseling, financial coaching, HIV and STI testing, sexual assault services, and alcohol and other drug education.

=== Diversity ===
Student body composition as of May 2, 2022
Race and ethnicity	Total
White	66%
Asian	8%
Black	7%
Foreign national	7%
Other (Note: Other consists of Multiracial Americans & those who prefer to not say.)	7%
Hispanic	5%
Economic diversity
Low-income (Note: The percentage of students who received an income-based federal Pell grant intended for low-income students.)	18%
Affluent (Note: The percentage of students who are a part of the American middle class at the bare minimum.)	82%

The Washington Monthly college rankings, which seek to evaluate colleges' contributions to American society based on factors of social mobility, research and service to the country by their graduates, placed Ohio State 61st among national universities in 2023.

=== Sexual harassment handling ===
In June 2018, Ohio State dissolved its Sexual Civility and Empowerment unit and eliminated four positions in the unit due to concerns about mismanagement and a lack of support for survivors of sexual assault. This occurred after the unit was suspended in February 2018 and following an external review. The Columbus Dispatch and the school newspaper, The Lantern, reported that "[SCE] failed to properly report students' sexual-assault complaints" and that some victims were told that they were "'lying', 'delusional', 'suffering from mental illness', 'have an active imagination', that they 'didn't understand their own experience', and also 'fabricated their story'". With help from the Philadelphia law firm Cozen O'Connor, the university will be creating a new framework to handle sexual assault cases and reevaluating its Title IX program.

On July 20, 2018, BBC News reported that over 100 male students, including athletes from 14 sports, had reported sexual misconduct by a deceased university team physician, Richard Strauss. The reports dated back to 1978, and included claims that he groped and took nude photographs of his patients. Four former wrestlers filed a lawsuit against Ohio State for ignoring complaints of "rampant sexual misconduct" by Strauss. U.S. representative Jim Jordan was named in the lawsuit and has since denied the former wrestlers' claims that he knew about the abuse while he was an assistant coach for eight years at the university. In May 2020, the university entered into a settlement and agreed to pay $40.9 million to the sexual abuse survivors.

=== Activities and organizations ===
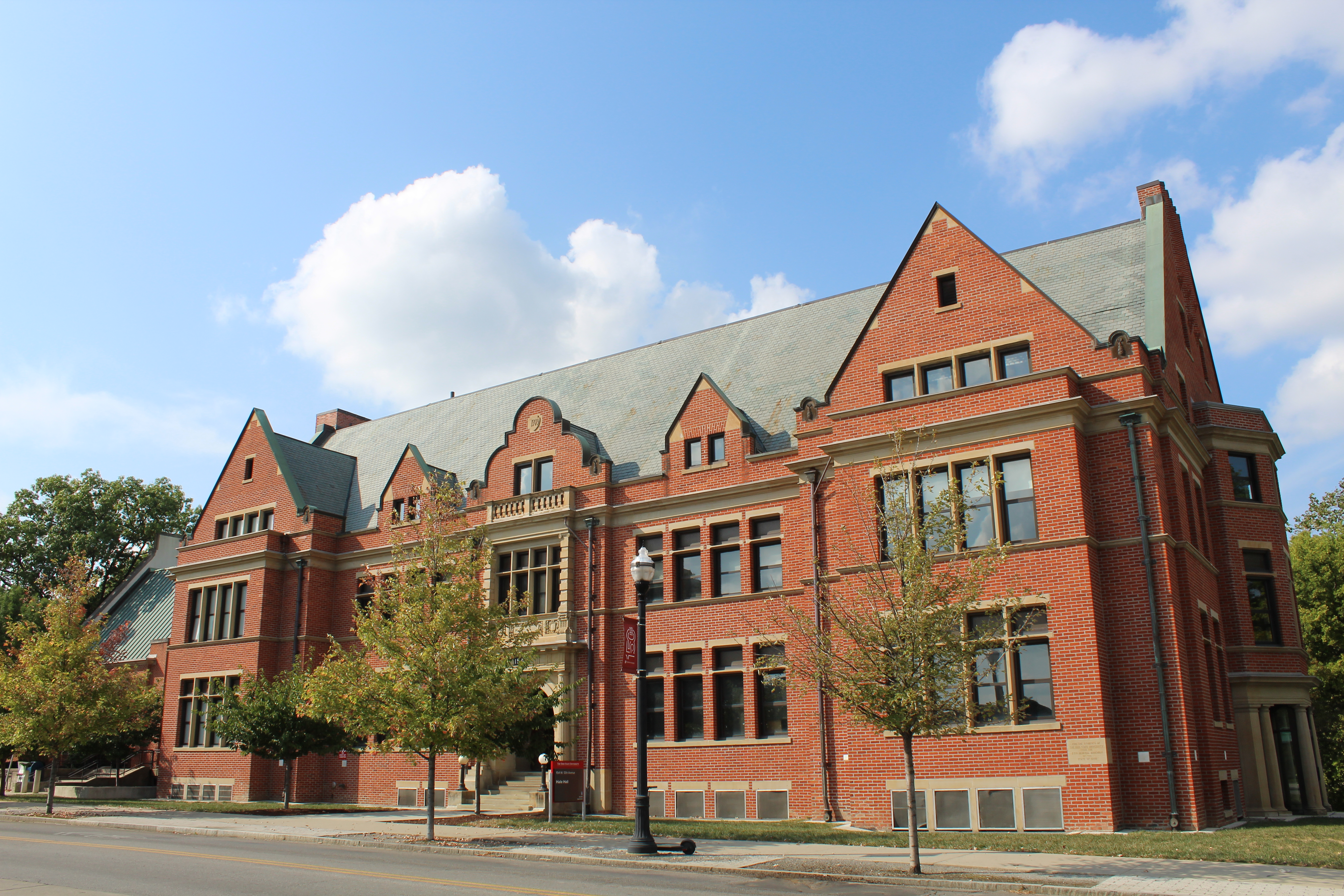
Hale Hall was the original home of the Ohio Union.

The Ohio Union was the first student union built by an American public university. It is dedicated to the enrichment of the student experience, on and off the university campus. The first Ohio Union, on the south edge of the South Oval, was constructed in 1909 and was later renamed Enarson Hall. The second Ohio Union was completed in 1950 and was prominently along High Street, southeast of the Oval. It was a center of student life for more than 50 years, providing facilities for student activities, organizations and events, and serving as an important meeting place for campus and community interaction. The union also housed many student services and programs, along with dining and recreational facilities. The second Ohio Union was demolished in February 2007 to make way for the new Ohio Union, which was finished in 2010. During this time, student activities were relocated to Ohio Stadium and other academic buildings.

The university has over 1,000 student organizations; intercollegiate, club and recreational sports programs; student media organizations and publications, fraternities and sororities; and three student governments.

==== Student organizations ====
Student organizations at Ohio State provide students with opportunities to get involved in a wide variety of interest areas including academic, social, religious, artistic, service-based, diversity and many more. There are over 1,000 registered student organizations that involve many thousands of students. The university's forensics team has won the state National Forensics Association tournament several times.

Block "O" is currently the largest student-run organization on the campus of Ohio State. With over 2,400 annual members, Block "O" serves as the official student cheering section at athletic events for the university. According to the Student Organization Office in the Ohio Union, Agricultural Education Society is the oldest student organization on campus. The Men's Glee Club often disputes the claim, but after consultation with Ohio Union Staff, Agricultural Education Society was named as the university's oldest organization.

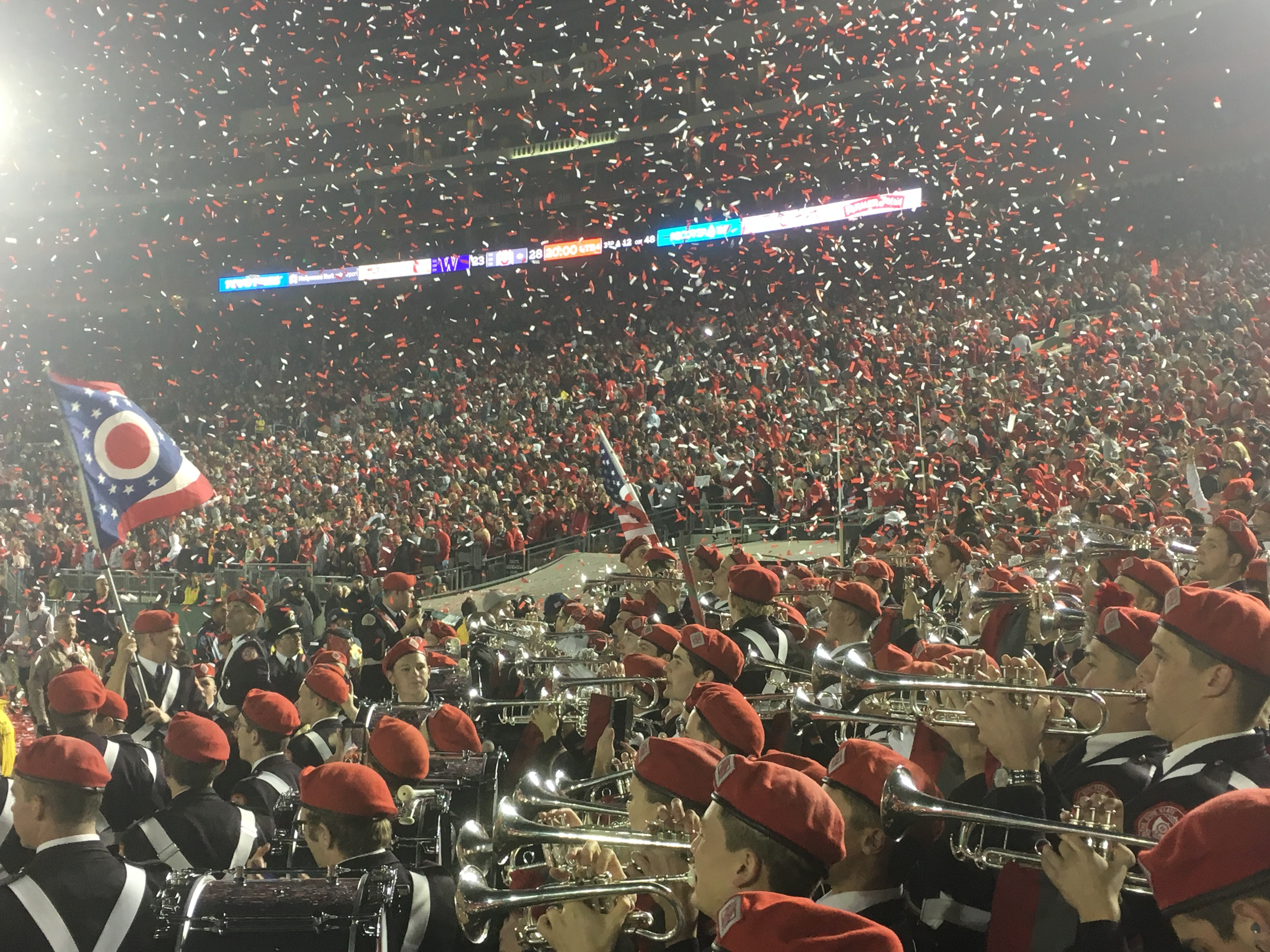
Fans celebrating Ohio State's victory in the 2019 Rose Bowl with the Ohio State University Marching Band

Each year, students may sign up to participate in BuckeyeThon, Ohio State's student-led philanthropy. The organization hosts events throughout the year to support the hematology/oncology/bone marrow transplant unit at Nationwide Children's Hospital in Columbus. Each February, thousands of students and community members attend BuckeyeThon's signature event, a Dance Marathon consisting of two separate 12-hour shifts. Between 2001 and 2016, students raised over $5 million to support treatment, research, and therapies at the hospital. Unique to BuckeyeThon is the use of an operational fund separate from the main philanthropic cancer fund. As a registered non-profit, BuckeyeThon is subject to university audits and issues gift receipts through the university's foundation.

Ohio State has several student-managed publications and media outlets. The Makio is the official yearbook. The Makio's sales plummeted by 60% during the early 1970s; the organization went bankrupt and stopped publication during the late 1970s. The book was revived from 1985 to 1994 and again in 2000, thanks to several student organizations. The Lantern is the school's daily newspaper and has operated as a laboratory newspaper in the School of Communication (formerly the School of Journalism) since 1881. Mosaic is a literary magazine published by Ohio State, which features undergraduate fiction, poetry, and art. The Sundial is a student-written and -published humor magazine. Founded in 1911, it is one of the oldest humor magazines in the country, but has not been published without large interruptions. Ohio State has two improvisational comedy groups that regularly perform around campus and across the U.S. There are two student-run radio stations: AROUSE, the music station, is home to over 100 student DJs, streaming music and independent content, and Scarlet and Gray Sports Radio. Students also operate a local cable TV channel known as Buckeye TV, which airs primarily on the campus closed cable system operated by the Office of the Chief Information Officer (OCIO).

==== Student government ====
At the Ohio State University, three recognized student governments represent their constituents.

1. Undergraduate Student Government (USG), which consists of elected and appointed student representatives who serve as liaisons from the undergraduate student body to university officials. USG seeks to outreach to and work for the students at Ohio State.
2. Council of Graduate Students (CGS), which promotes and provides academic, administrative, and social programs for the university community in general and for graduate students in particular. The council provides a forum in which the graduate student body may present, discuss and set upon issues related to its role in the academic and non-academic aspects of the university community.
3. Inter-Professional Council (IPC), which is a representative body of all professional students in the colleges of dentistry, law, medicine, optometry, pharmacy, and veterinary medicine. Its purpose is to act as a liaison between these students and the governing bodies of the university.

=== Residential life ===
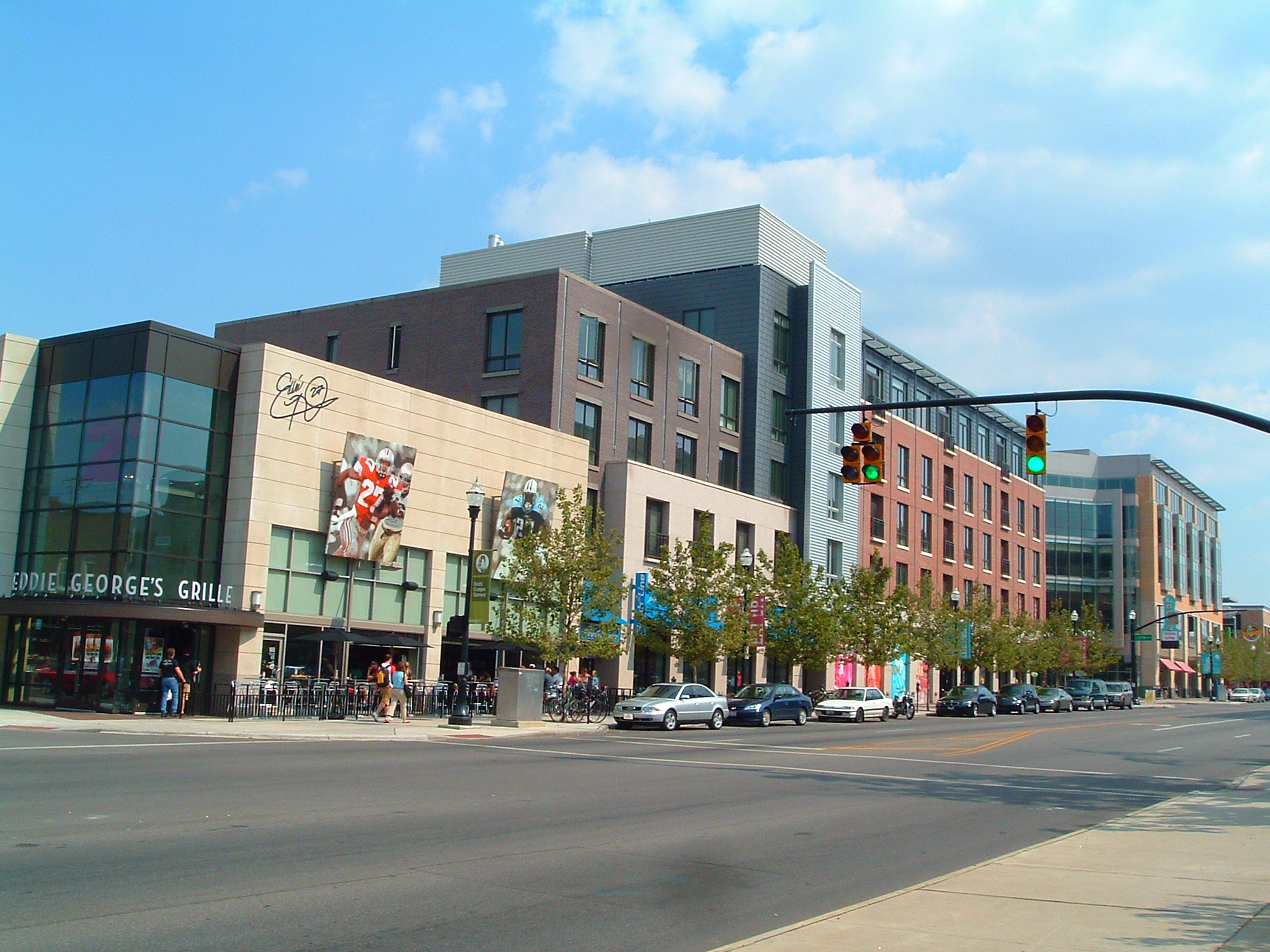
South Campus Gateway

Ohio State operates 41 on-campus residence halls divided into three geographic clusters: South Campus (site of the university's original dormitories), North Campus (largely constructed during the post-war enrollment boom) and West Campus ("The Towers"). The residence hall system has 40 smaller living and learning environments defined by social or academic considerations.

Separate housing for graduate and professional students is maintained on the Southern tier of campus within the Gateway Residential Complex and the William H. Hall Student Residential Complex. Family housing is maintained at Buckeye Village at the far northern edge of campus beyond the athletic complex.

Student Life University Housing also administers student residential housing on the OSU Newark, OSU Mansfield and OSU Agricultural Technical Institute (ATI) campuses.

The Residence Hall Advisory Council (RHAC), which is a representative body of all students living in the university's residence halls, helps evaluate and improve the living conditions of the residence halls.

- North Campus: Archer House, Barrett House, Blackburn House, Bowen House, Busch House, Drackett Tower, Halloran House, Haverfield House, Houck House, Houston House, Jones Tower, Lawrence Tower, Mendoza House, Norton House, Nosker House, Raney House, Scott House, Taylor Tower, Torres House
- South Campus: Baker Hall East, Baker Hall West, Bradley Hall, Canfield Hall, Fechko House, German House, Hanley House, Mack Hall, Morrison Tower, Neil Avenue, Park-Stradley Hall, Paterson Hall, Pennsylvania Place, Pomerene House, Scholars East, Scholars West, Siebert Hall, Smith-Steeb Hall, The Residence on Tenth, Worthington Building
- West Campus: Lincoln Tower, Morrill Tower
- Off-campus: South Campus Gateway Apartments, Veterans' House

== Athletics ==
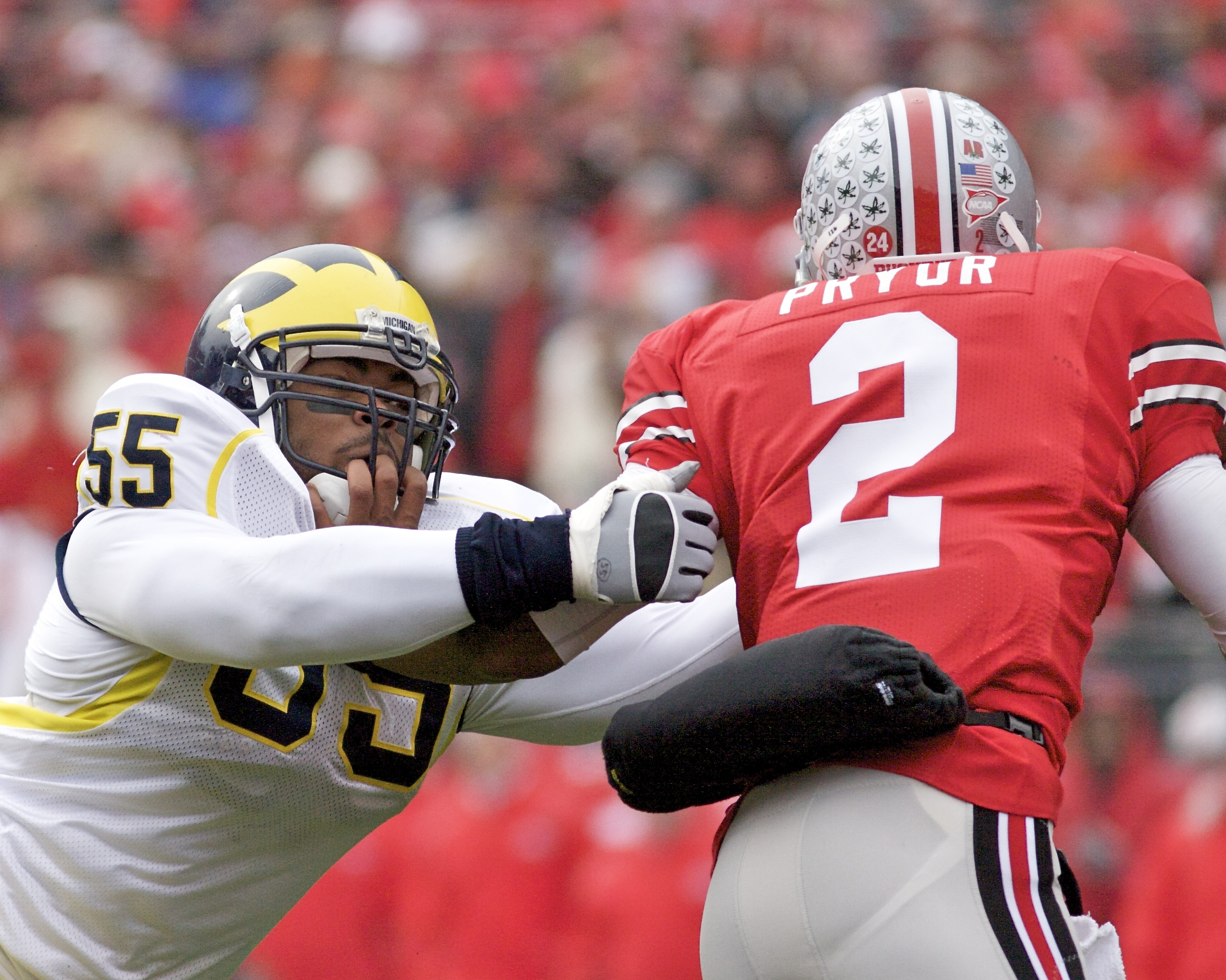
Terrelle Pryor (right) eludes Brandon Graham with a stiff arm.

Ohio State's intercollegiate sports teams are called the "Buckeyes" (derived from the colloquial term for people from the state of Ohio and after the state tree, the Ohio Buckeye) and participate in the NCAA's Division I in all sports and the Big Ten Conference in all but women's hockey. Ohio State currently has 36 varsity teams. Some of the sports figures who were student athletes at Ohio State include Jesse Owens, (track and field); John Havlicek, Jerry Lucas, and Katie Smith (basketball); Frank Howard (baseball); Jack Nicklaus (golf); Archie Griffin and Chic Harley (football running backs). Hall of Fame coaches at Ohio State have included Paul Brown and Woody Hayes (football), Fred Taylor (men's basketball). Notable sports figures in Ohio State history may be inducted into the Ohio State Varsity O Hall of Fame. The school colors are scarlet and gray. Notable team symbols include the Brutus Buckeye mascot and two fight songs: "Across the Field" and "Buckeye Battle Cry". In 2007, Sports Illustrated nicknamed Ohio State's athletic program as being "The Program" due to the unsurpassed facilities, an unparalleled number of men's and women's sports teams and their success, and the financial support of an impressive fan base.

=== College football ===
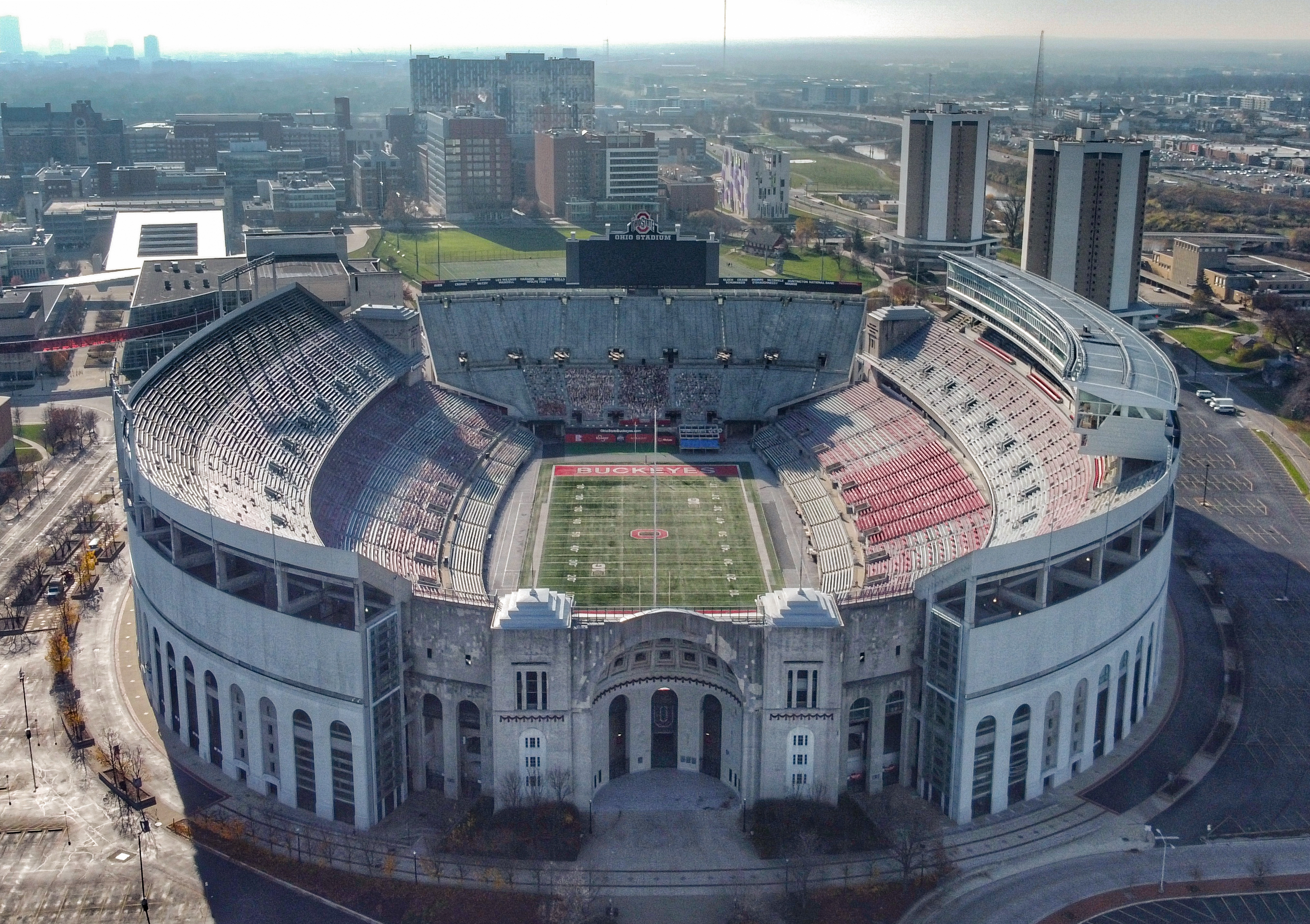
Ohio Stadium is the fifth largest stadium in the world.

The Buckeyes are one of the most successful college football programs. As of 2025, the Ohio State football program is valued at $2–2.5 billion, the highest valuation nationally.

With 990 wins as of the 2026 season, Ohio State ranks best all-time in winning percentage in the NCAA. The Buckeyes claim nine national championships: 1942, 1954, 1957, 1961, 1968, 1970, 2002, 2014, and 2024. At least one NCAA college football ranking considers Buckeyes national champions in the 1933, 1944, 1969, 1973, 1974, 1975, and 1998 seasons.

The program has captured 41 conference championships (2 OAC and 39 Big Ten), 10 division championships, and has compiled 10 undefeated seasons, including six perfect seasons (no losses or ties). Seven players have received the Heisman Trophy (second all-time), with the program holding the distinction of having the only two-time winner (Archie Griffin) of the award. The team's rivalry against the University of Michigan has been termed as one of the fiercest, greatest, and most influential in North American sports.

Ohio State is the only program in college football history to have never lost more than seven games in a single season.

=== Other ===
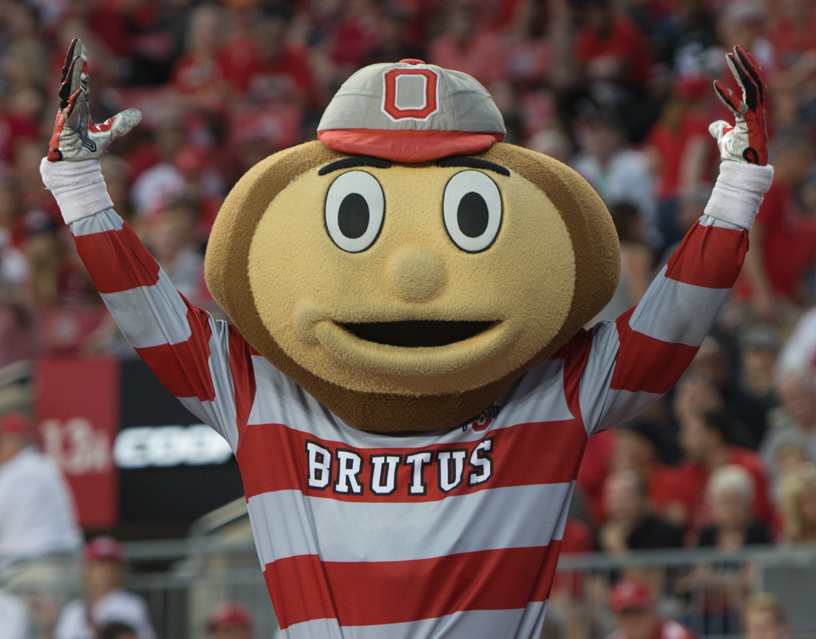
Brutus Buckeye at the Army-Ohio State football game (2017)

Ohio State is one of six universities – the University of Michigan, the University of Florida, Stanford University, University of California, Los Angeles and the University of California, Berkeley being the others – to have won national championships in all three major men's sports (baseball, basketball and football). Ohio State is also one of only two universities to appear in the national championship games in both football and men's basketball in the same calendar year (the other being the University of Florida). Ohio State has also won national championships in wrestling, men's volleyball, men's swimming and diving, men's outdoor track and field, men's golf, men's gymnastics, men's fencing, women's rowing, co-ed fencing and multiple synchronized swimming championships. The Ohio State equestrian team has won eight Intercollegiate Horse Show Association national championships.

Since the inception of the Athletic Director's Cup, Ohio State has finished in the top 25 each year, including top-six finishes in three of the last five years. During the 2005–2006 school year, Ohio State became the first Big Ten team to win conference championships in football, men's basketball and women's basketball. Ohio State repeated the feat during the 2006–2007 school year, winning solo championships in all three sports.

== Traditions ==
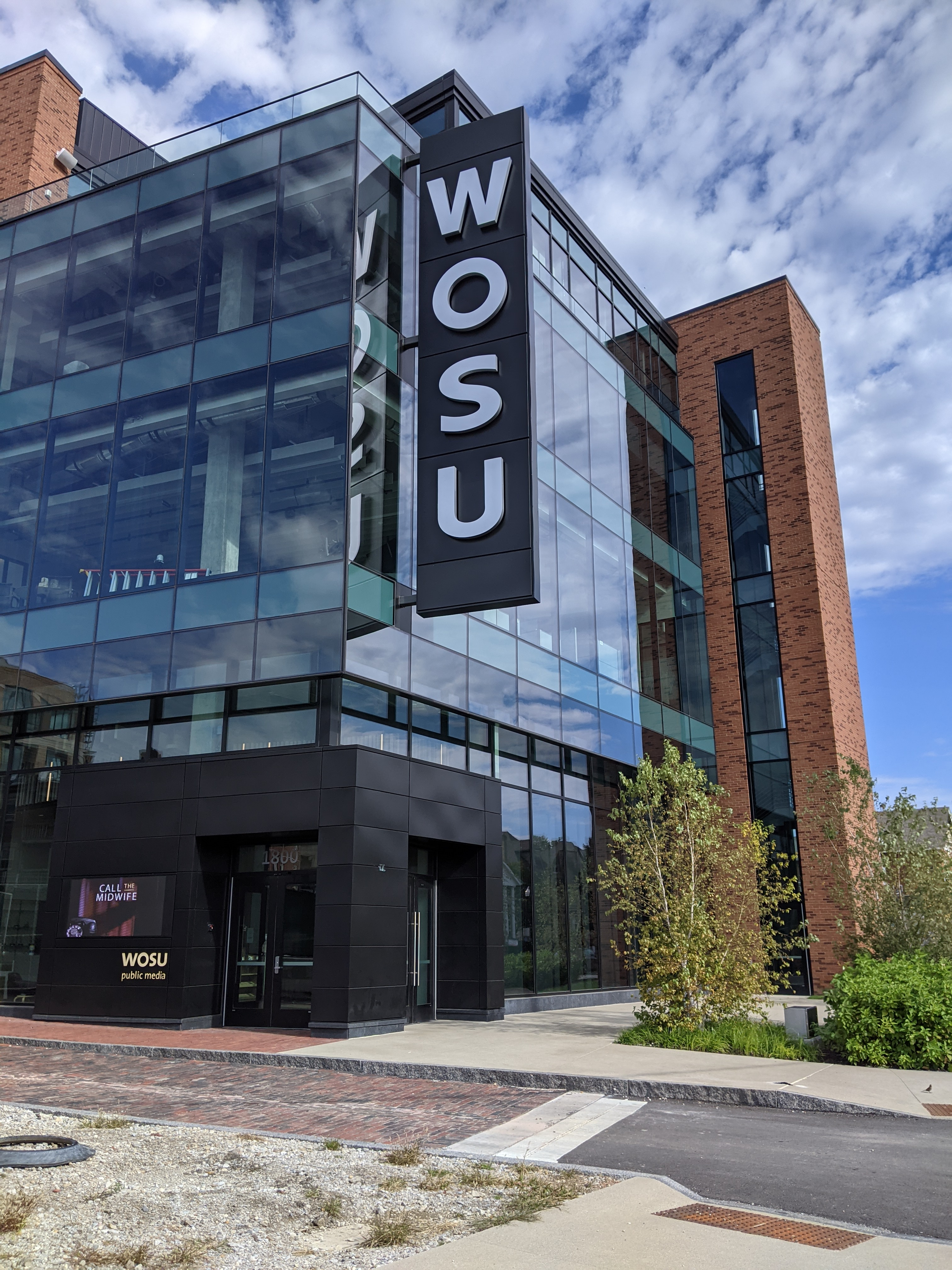
WOSU-TV Public Media building

The Ohio State University Marching Band is famous for "Script Ohio", during which the band marches single-file through the curves of the word "Ohio", much like a pen writes the word, all while playing the French march "Le Regiment de Sambre et Meuse".

"Across the Field", a fight song used by teams of all sports, has been played at events since 1915. "Buckeye Battle Cry", the second fight song which was first performed in 1928, is played as the marching band enters via the Ohio Stadium ramp.

In the mid-1990s, Buckeyes football players frequently identified their affiliation as "THE Ohio State University", after the university rebranded in 1986 to migrate away from the ambiguous "OSU" logo and emphasize the article "the". In 2022, after a three-year dispute with fashion designer Marc Jacobs over trademark registration with USPTO for the word "THE", both Ohio State and Jacobs agreed to share the branding.

=== Affiliated media ===
Ohio State operates a public television station, WOSU-TV (virtual channel 34/DT 16, a local PBS TV station), as well as two public radio stations, WOSU-FM 89.7(NPR/BBC news/talk) and WOSA-FM 101.1 (classical, "Classical 101") in Columbus.

== Notable people ==
=== Alumni ===
As of 2014, Ohio State has approximately 580,000 living alumni around the world. Past and present students and faculty include six Nobel Prize laureates, nine Rhodes Scholars, seven Churchill Scholars, 77 Goldwater scholars, one Fields Medalist and eight Pulitzer Prize winners. It also includes the current vice president of the United States, JD Vance, seven U.S. senators, and 15 U.S. representatives. 118 Olympic medals have been awarded to those who attended Ohio State. Also included are Medal of Honor recipients, ambassadors, Fortune 500 CEOs, UFC champions, and members of the Fortune 400 list of the world's wealthiest individuals. Its alumni have been inducted into the Baseball Hall of Fame in Cooperstown, New York, the NFL Hall of Fame and the Basketball Hall of Fame. Three of its athletes have received the Sullivan Award as the nation's top amateur athlete.

Roboticist James S. Albus was named a "Hero of US Manufacturing" by Fortune magazine in 1997. Howard Tucker, who as of April 2023 was the world's oldest living practicing doctor at 100, attended for both his undergraduate work and medical school.

Notable alumni include:

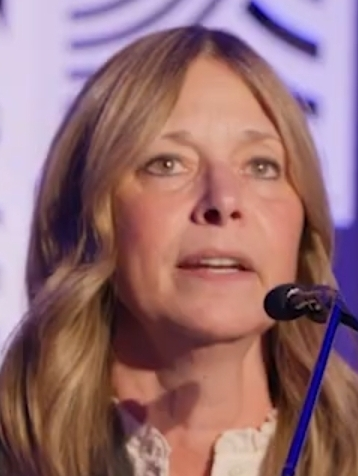
Amy Acton, Director of the Ohio Department of Health

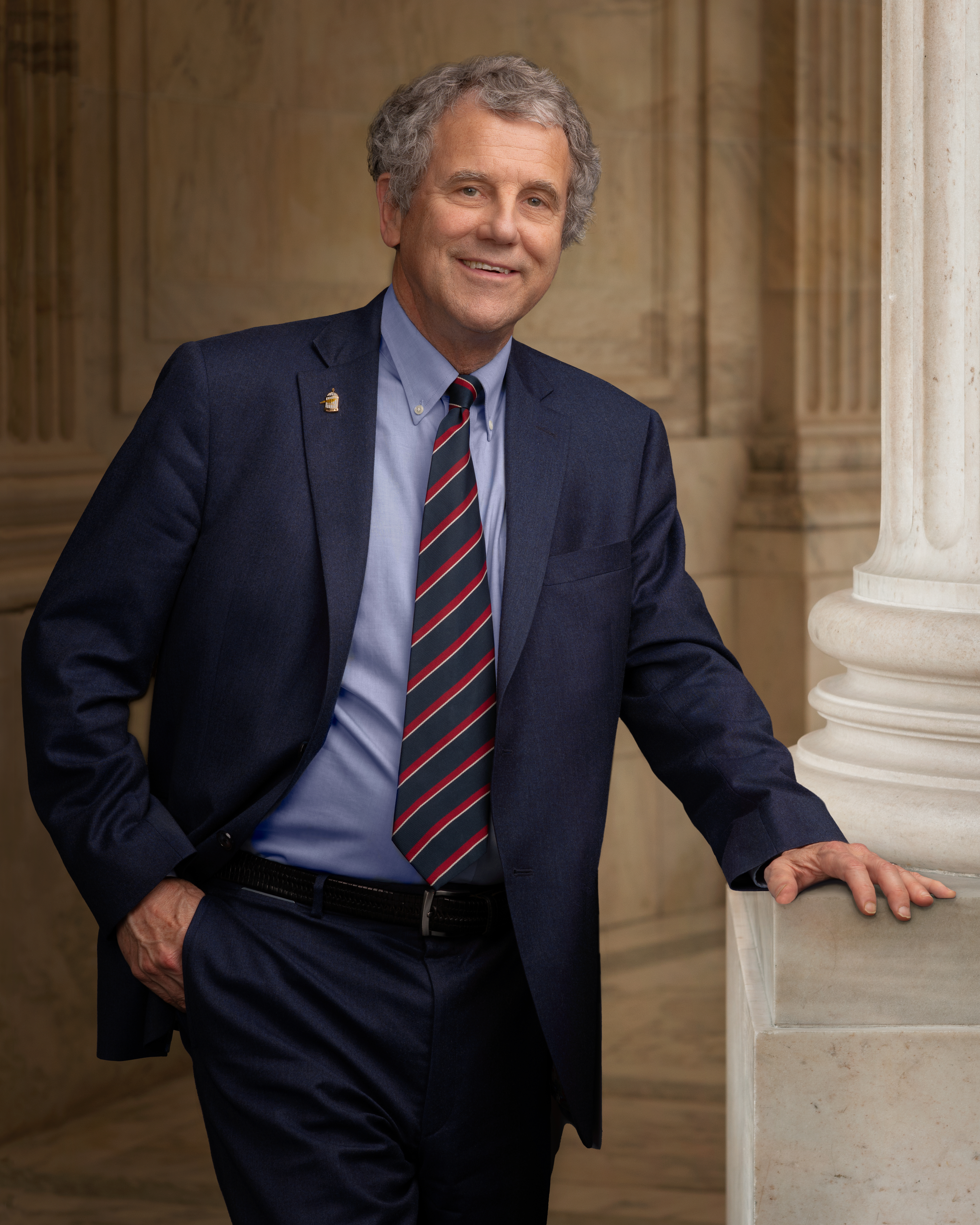
Sherrod Brown, politician who served from 2007 to 2025 as a United States senator from Ohio

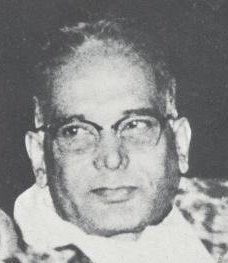
Jayaprakash Narayan, Indian activist known for leading Bihar movement

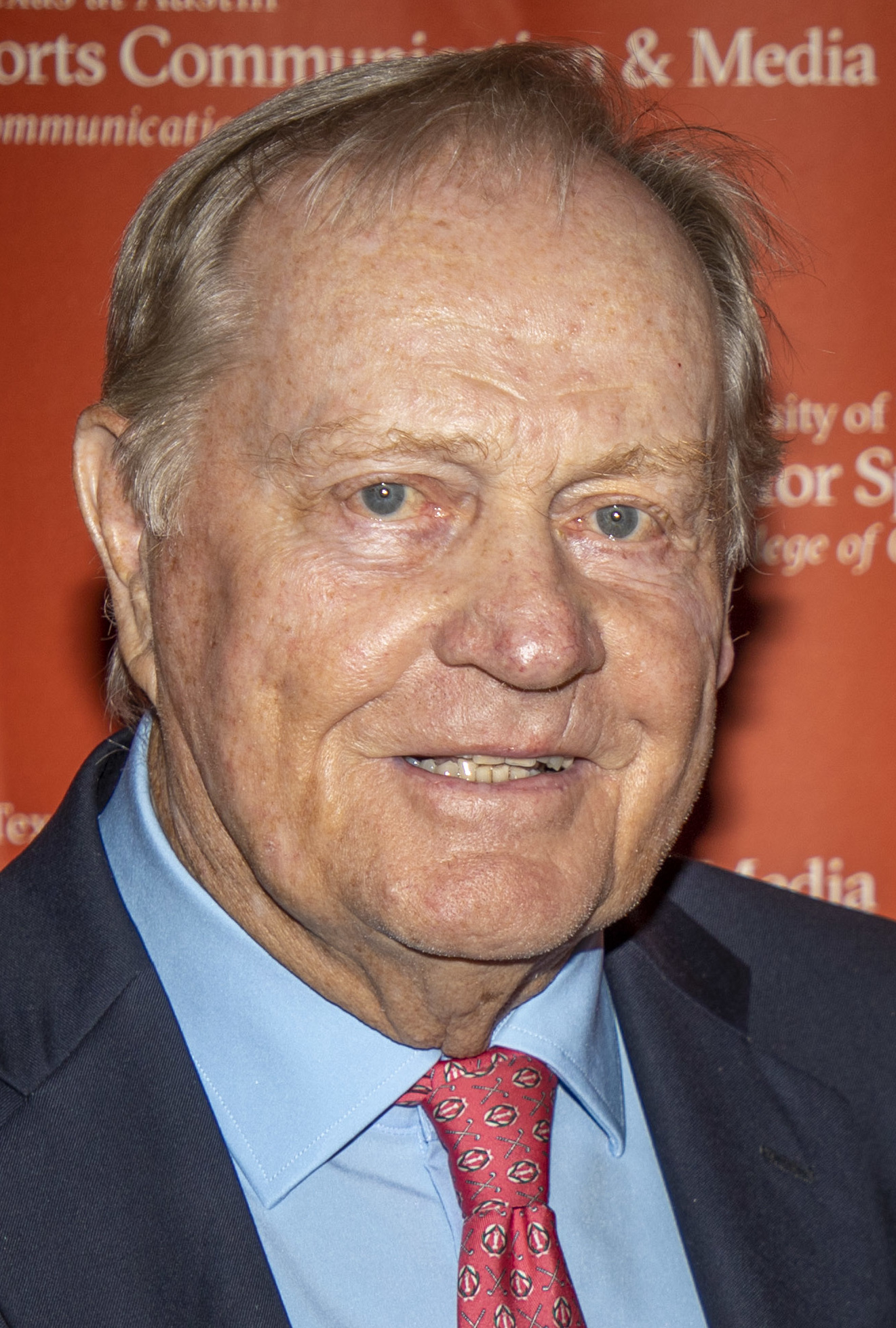
Jack Nicklaus, professional golfer and course designer

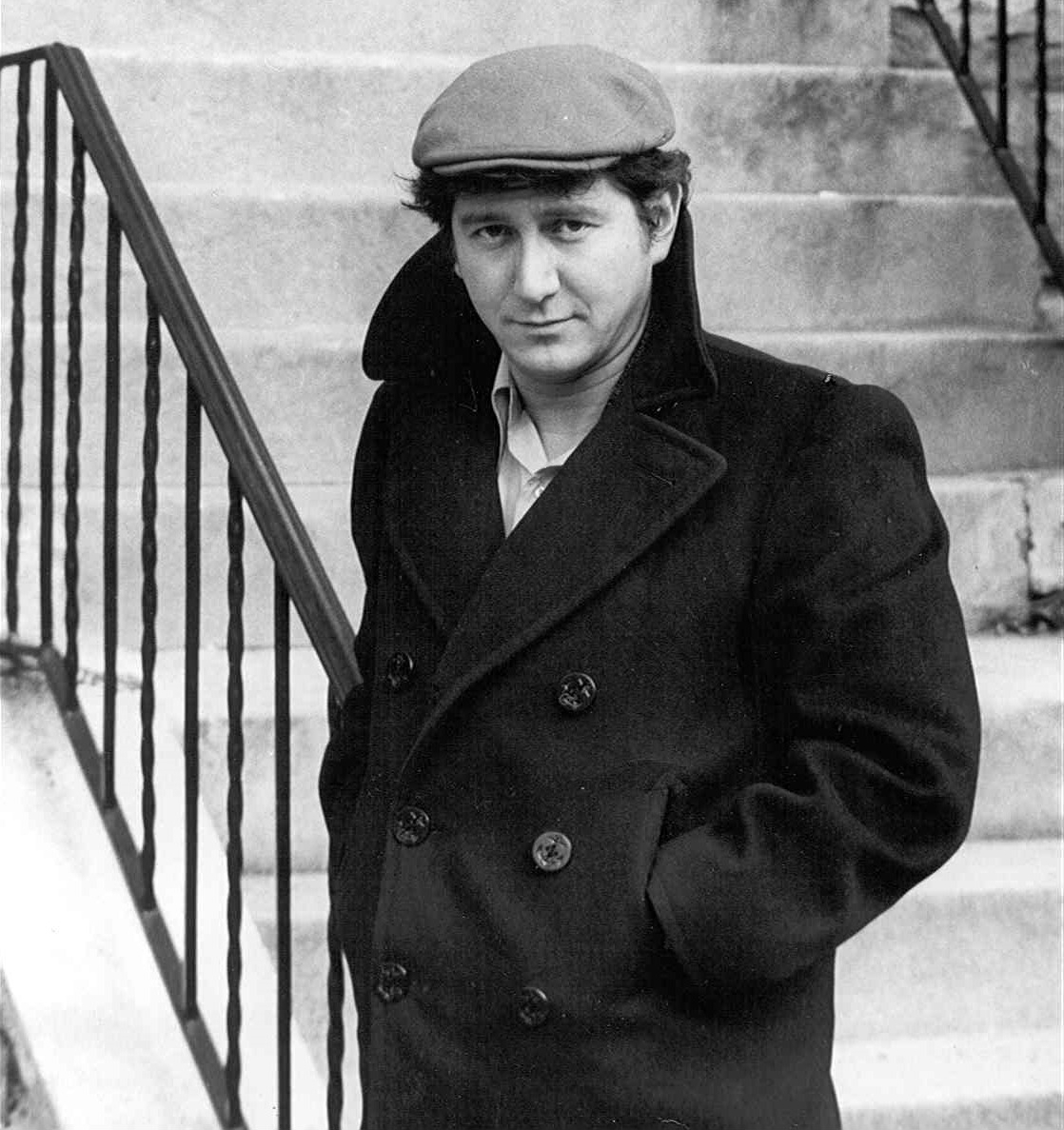
Phil Ochs, songwriter, protest singer, and political activist

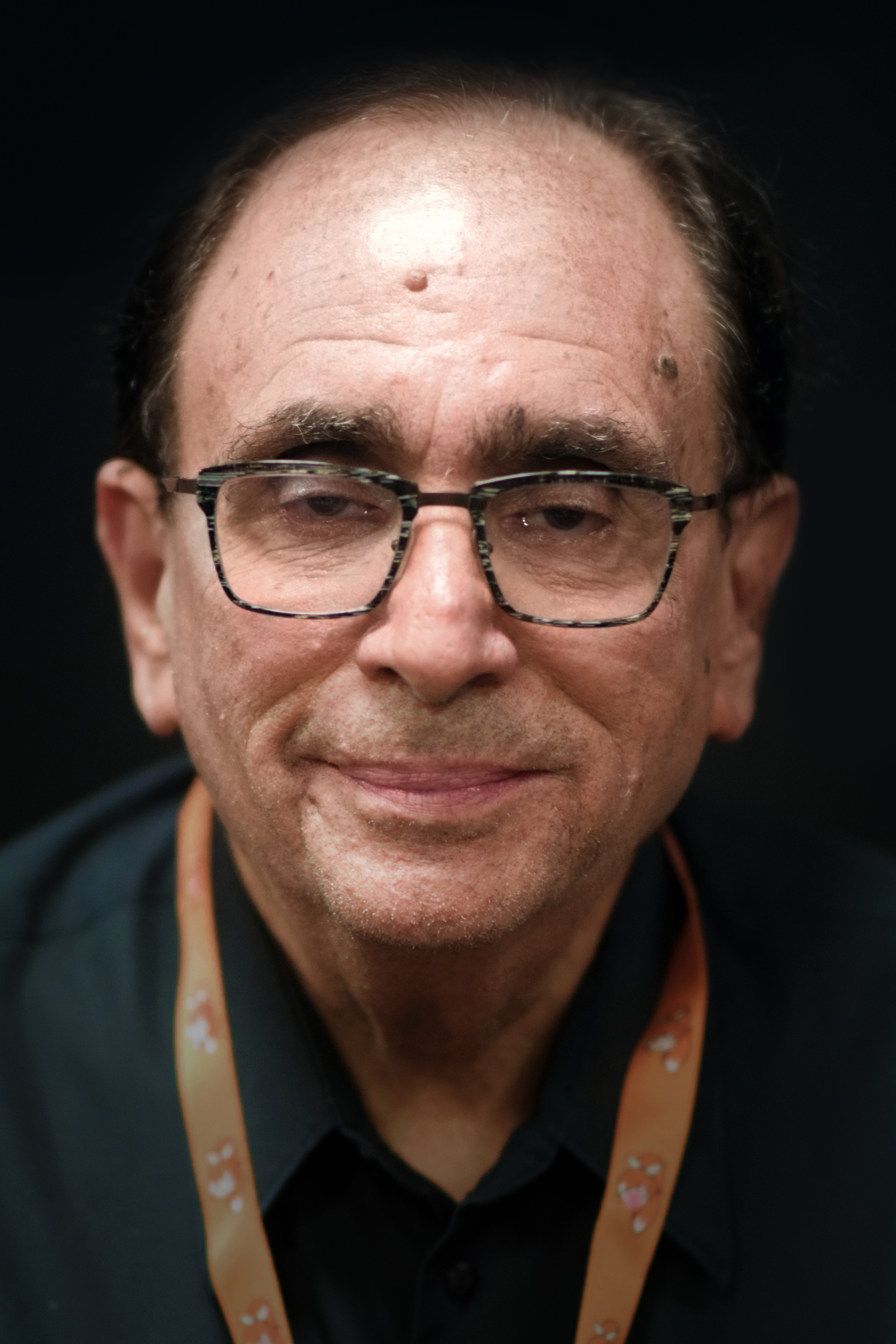
R.L. Stine, novelist known for the series Goosebumps

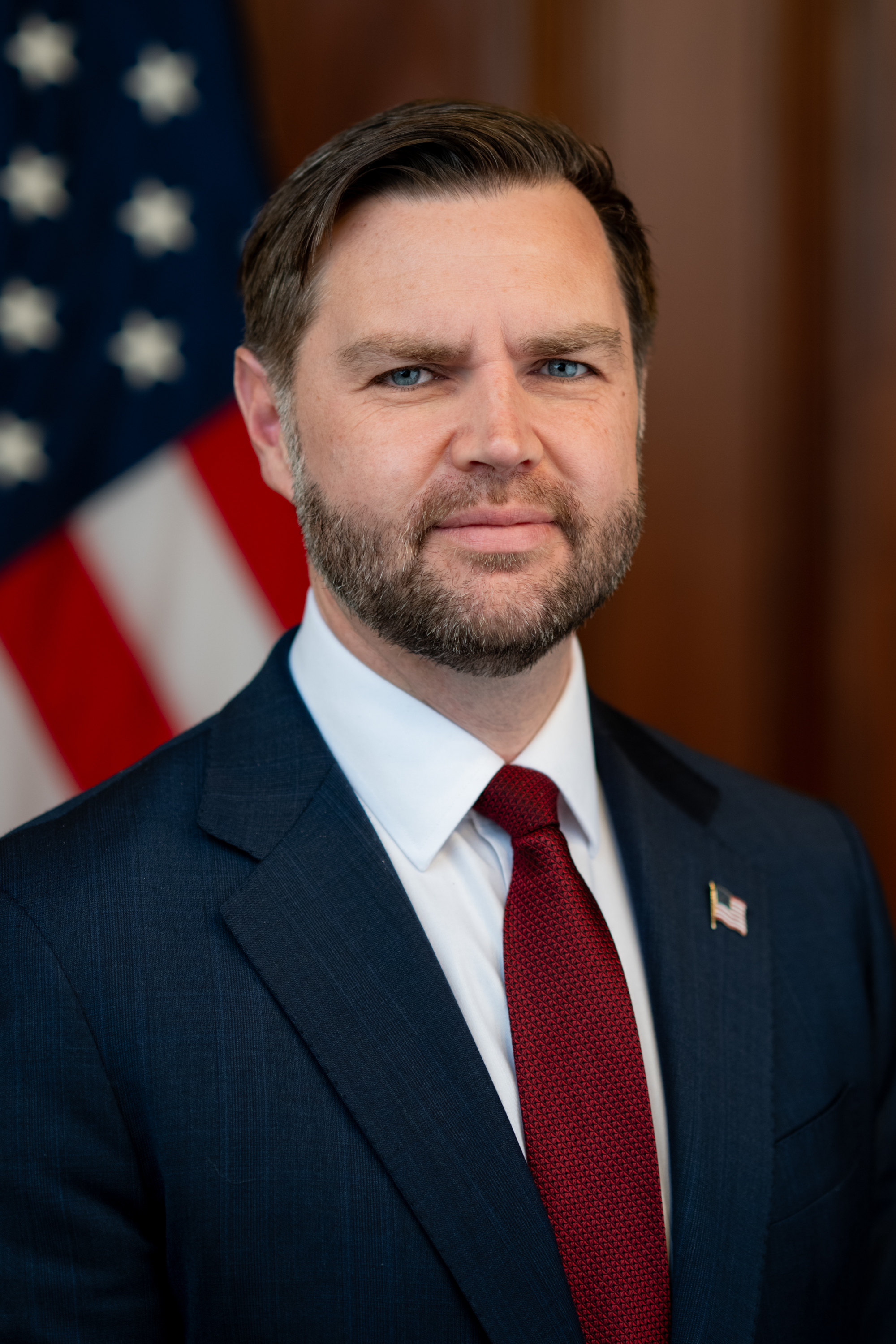
JD Vance, current vice president of the United States

=== Faculty ===
As of 2008, Ohio State's faculty included 21 members of the National Academy of Sciences or National Academy of Engineering, four members of the Institute of Medicine and 177 elected fellows of the American Association for the Advancement of Science. In 2009, 17 Ohio State faculty members were elected as AAAS Fellows. Each year since 2002, Ohio State has either led or been second among all American universities in the number of their faculty members elected as fellows to the AAAS.

In surveys conducted in 2005 and 2006 by the Collaborative on Academic Careers in Higher Education (COACHE), Ohio State was rated as "exemplary" in four of the seven measured aspects of workplace satisfaction for junior faculty members at 31 universities: overall tenure practices, policy effectiveness, compensation and work-family balance.

Notable past and present Ohio State faculty include:

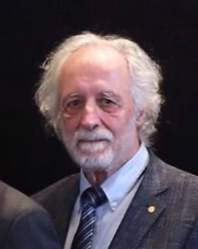
Pierre Agostini, winner of 2023 Nobel Prize in Physics

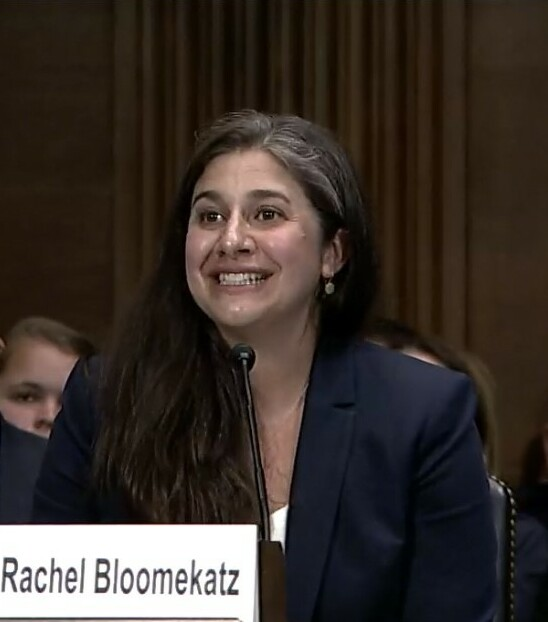
Rachel Bloomekatz, Judge of the United States Court of Appeals for the Sixth Circuit.

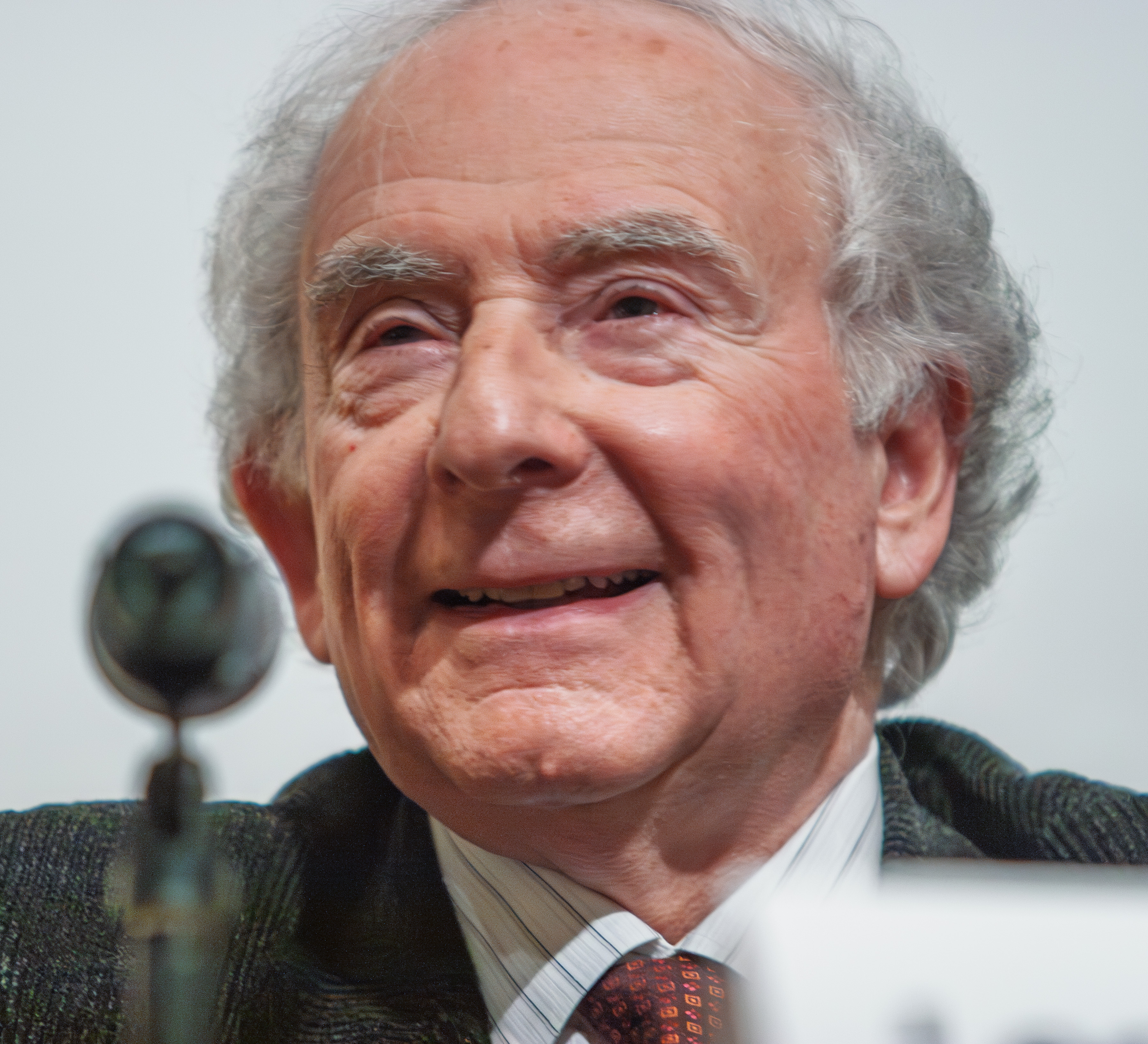
Leon Cooper, 1972 winner of Nobel Prize in Physics

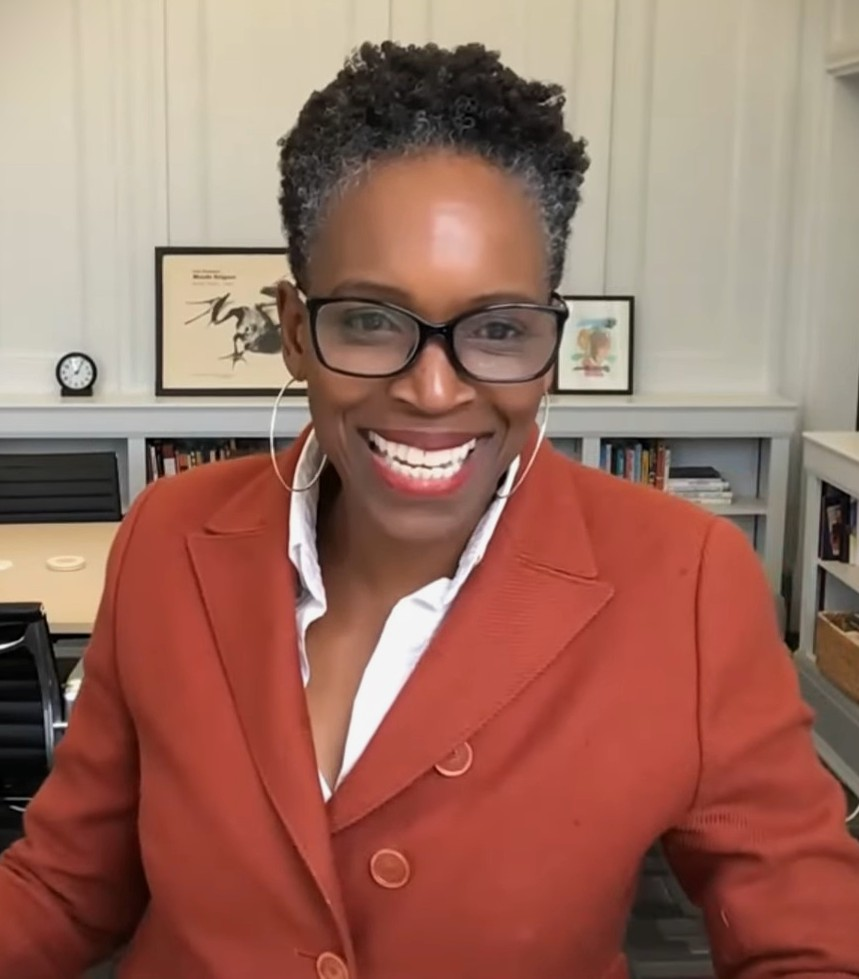
Melissa Gilliam, 11th president of Boston University

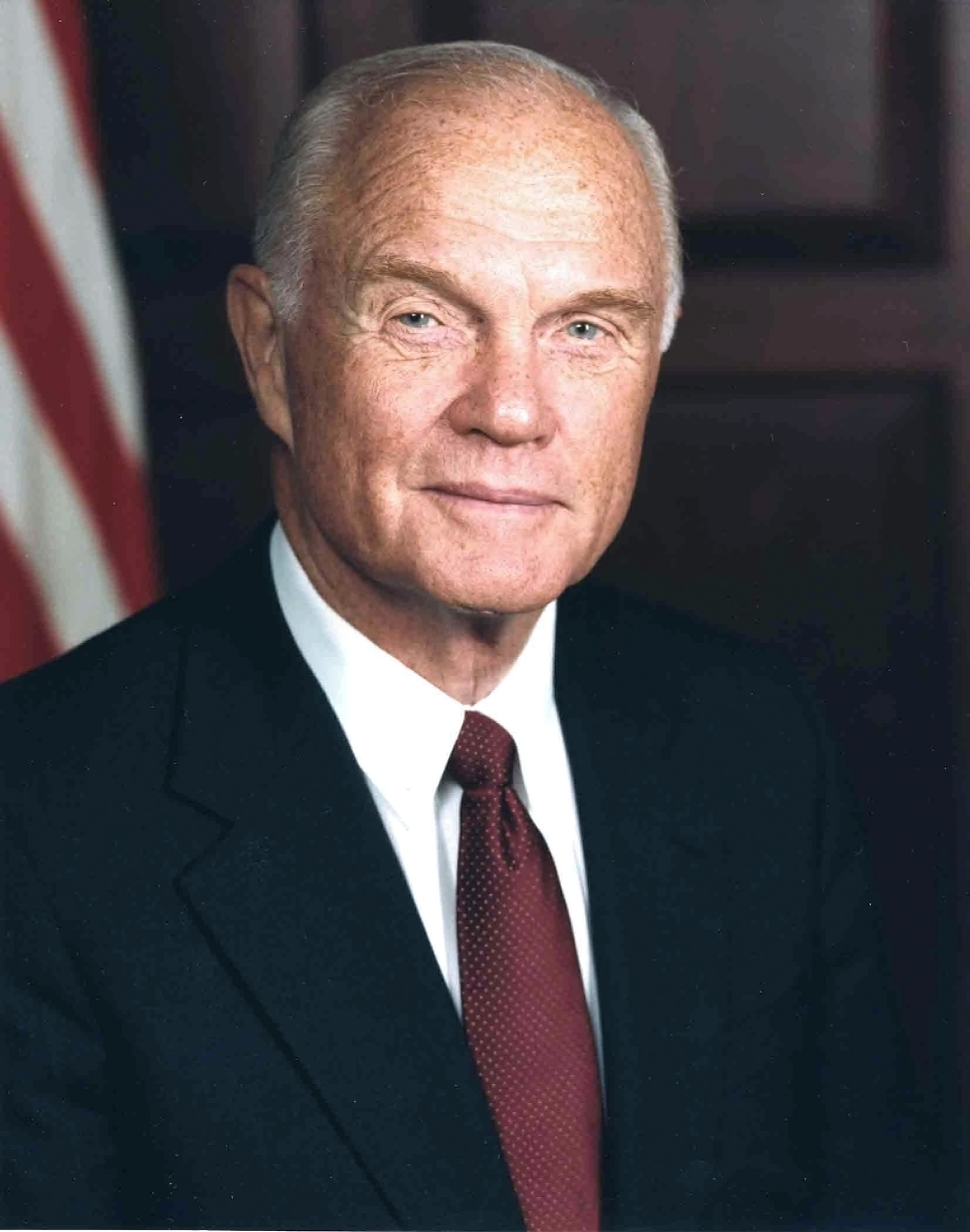
John Glenn, Astronaut and U.S. Senator from Ohio

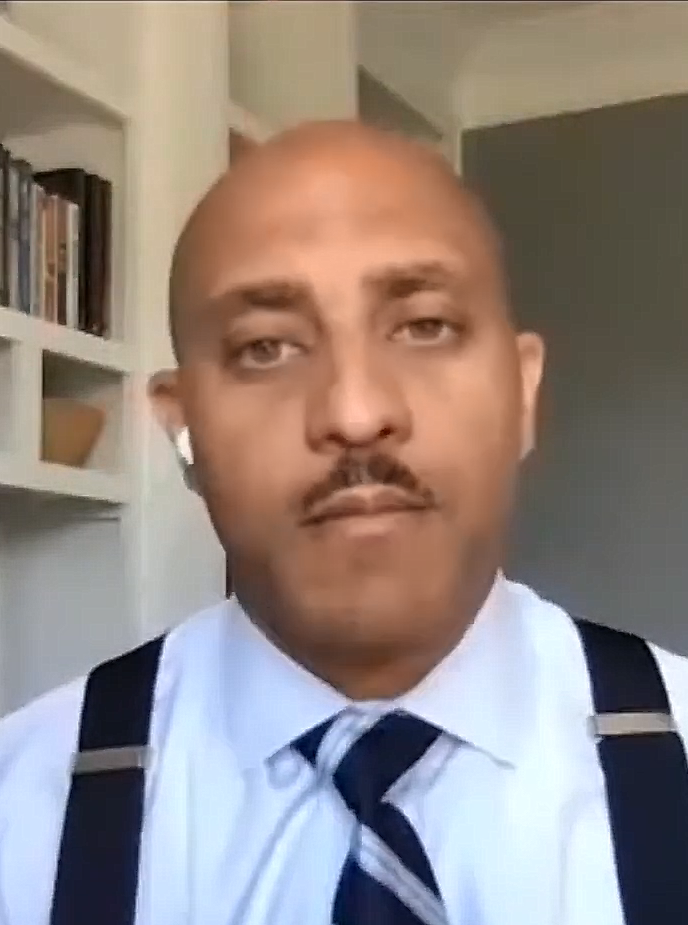
Hasan Kwame Jeffries, history professor and author; brother of Hakeem Jeffries

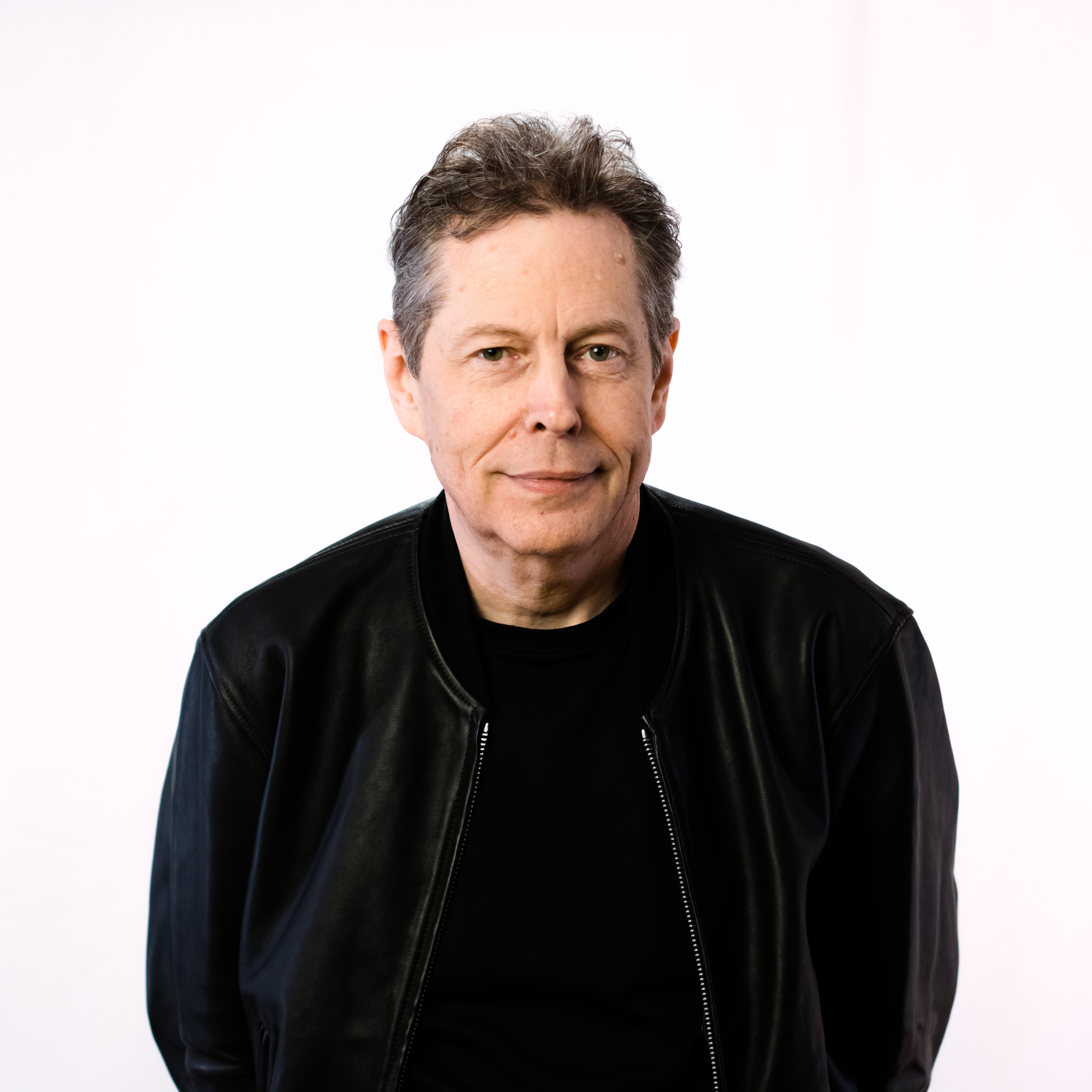
Alexander Wendt, political scientist, founder of constructivism in international relations

== See also ==
- Jack Nicklaus Museum
- List of presidents of Ohio State University
- Ohio State University Press
- Senate Bill 1 effects on Ohio State University
