= Çay Üzü =

- Municipality
- Location within Azerbaijan
- Coordinates: 38°53′00″N 48°10′41″E
- Country: Azerbaijan
- Rayon: Yardymli

Population
  - Total: 956
- Time zone: UTC+4 (AZT)
  - Summer (DST): UTC+5 (AZT)

Çay Üzü (also, Chayuzi) is a village and municipality in the Yardymli Rayon of Azerbaijan. It has a population of 956. The municipality consists of the villages of Çay Üzü and Avur. It is located at an elevation of 1,110 meters above sea level
