= Uzo =

Uzo or Uzō may refer to:

== People ==
- Uzo Asonye, American attorney
- Uzō Nishiyama (1911–1994), Japanese architect
- Uzo Egonu (1931–1996), Nigerian artist
- Uzo (filmmaker) (born 1957), Nigerian filmmaker
- Uzo Iwobi (born 1969), British-Nigerian solicitor
- Uzo Aduba (born 1981), Nigerian-American actress
- Uchenna Uzo (born 1992), Nigerian footballer
- Tobenna Uzo (born 1994), Nigerian footballer

== Other ==
- Isi Uzo, a local government area in Nigeria
- Uzo Uwani, a local government area in Nigeria

== See also ==
- Uzos, a commune in south west France
- Ouzo, an anise-flavoured aperitif widely consumed in Greece and Cyprus
- Itu Mbon Uzo language, a dialect of the Ibuoro language
