= Dağ Üzü =

- Municipality
- Location within Azerbaijan
- Coordinates: 38°51′58″N 48°10′17″E
- Country: Azerbaijan
- Rayon: Yardymli

Population
  - Total: 693
- Time zone: UTC+4 (AZT)
  - Summer (DST): UTC+5 (AZT)

Dağ Üzü (also, Daguzi or Daguzu) is a village and municipality in the Yardymli Rayon of Azerbaijan. It has a population of 693. It is situated on the Peshtasar mountains.
