= Avur, Azerbaijan =

Avur
- Location within Azerbaijan
- Coordinates: 38°53′14″N 48°10′50″E
- Country: Azerbaijan
- Rayon: Yardymli
- Municipality: Urakəran
- Time zone: UTC+4 (AZT)
  - Summer (DST): UTC+5 (AZT)

Avur is a village in the Yardymli Rayon of Azerbaijan. The village forms part of the municipality of Çay Üzü.
