= Ozu =

Ozu or Ōzu, occasionally Oozu, may refer to:

== Places ==
- Ōzu, Ehime, a city in Ehime Prefecture
- Ōzu, Kumamoto, a town in Kumamoto Prefecture
- Özü Eyalet, a former eyalet in the Ottoman Empire
- Ōzushima, or Ōzu Island, an island in the Seto Inland Sea in Japan

== People ==
- Ozu Moreira (born 1986), a beach soccer player
- Yasujirō Ozu (1903–63), a Japanese filmmaker
- Ozu, a character on the TV show Kappa Mikey

== See also ==
- OZU: Ozu Yasujirō ga Kaita Monogatari, a 2023 television series based on Yasujirō Ozu’s several films.
- Osu (disambiguation)
