= Catholic universities and colleges in Ohio =

The U.S. state of Ohio is home to a number of Catholic institutions of higher learning. In 1829, the first Bishop of Cincinnati, Edward Fenwick, founded St. Francis Xavier Seminary. Two years later he established the Athenaeum to educate lay students. From that original foundation grew Xavier University, the sixth-oldest Catholic and fourth-oldest Jesuit university in the United States, and the Athenaeum of Ohio, the third oldest Catholic seminary in the United States.

== Active institutions ==
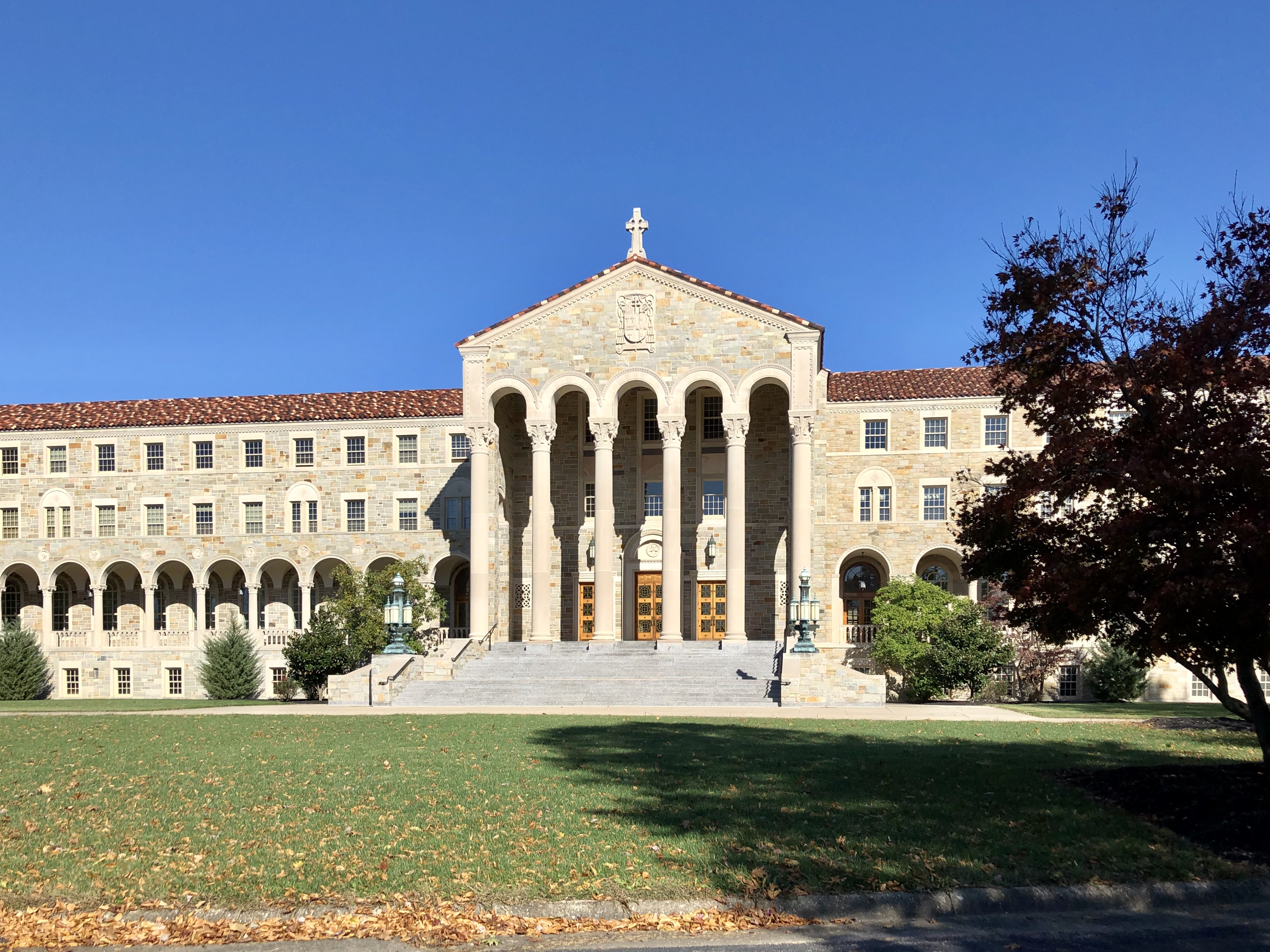
Mount St. Mary's Seminary of the West at the Athenaeum of Ohio

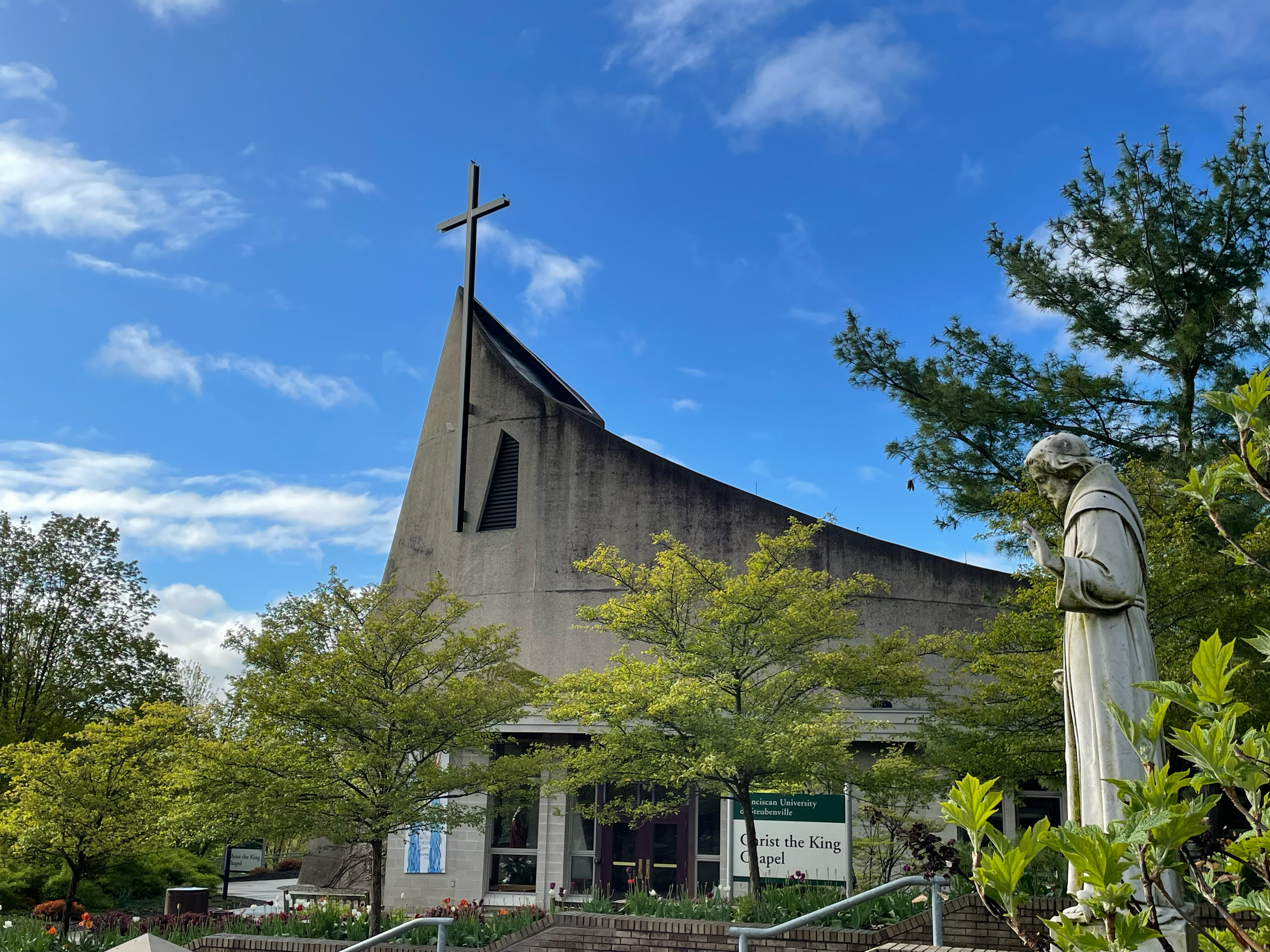
Christ the King Chapel at Franciscan University of Steubenville

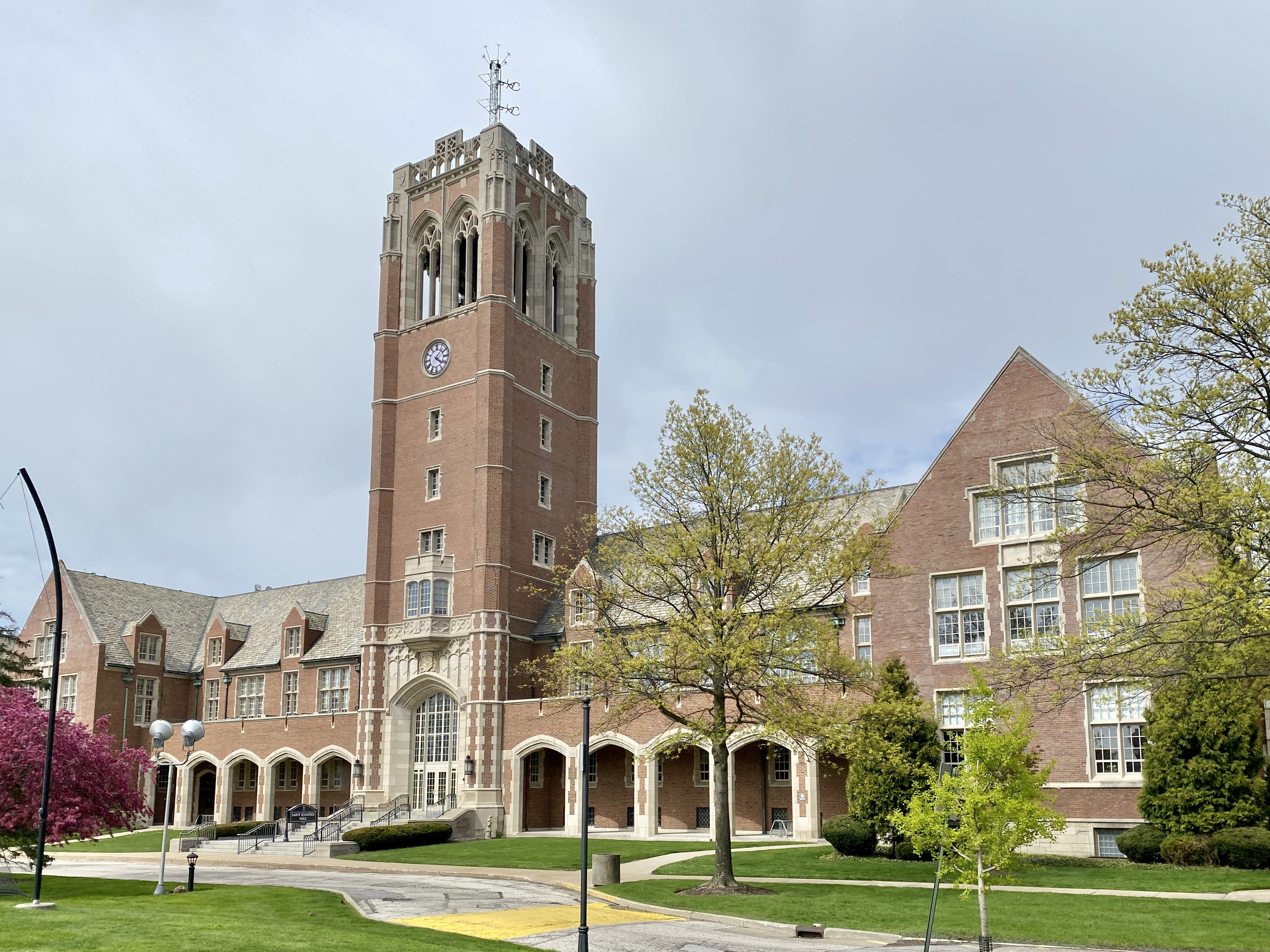
Saint Ignatius Hall at John Carroll University

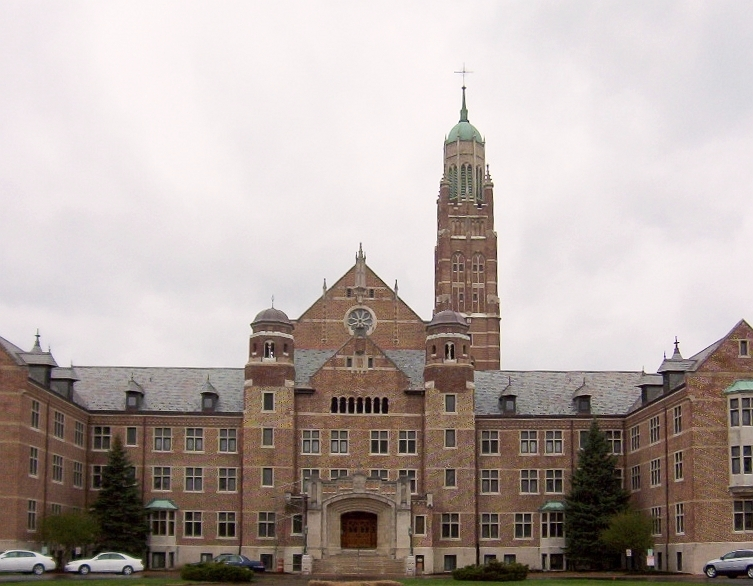
Main Building at the Pontifical College Josephinum

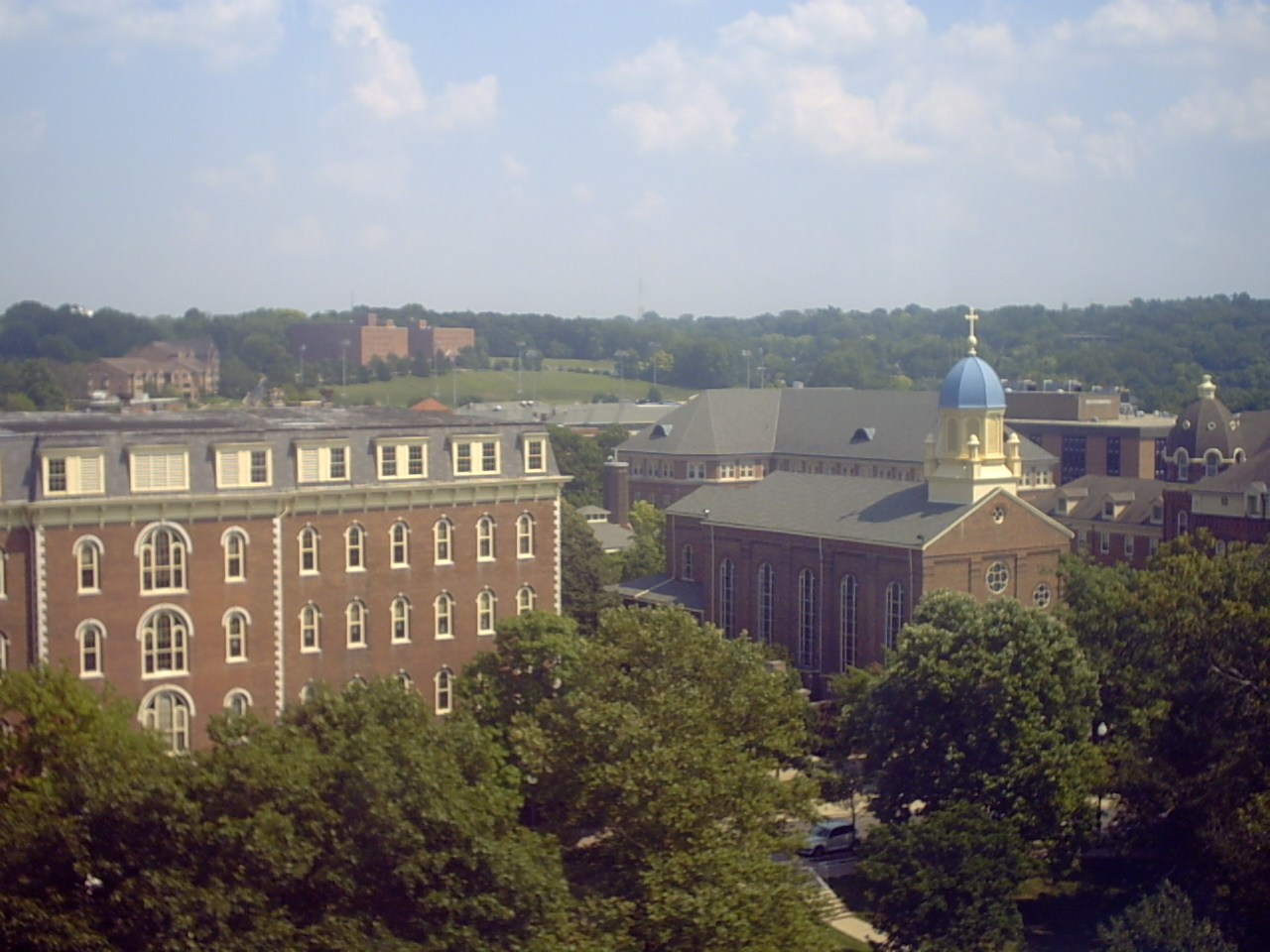
The Immaculate Conception Chapel at the University of Dayton

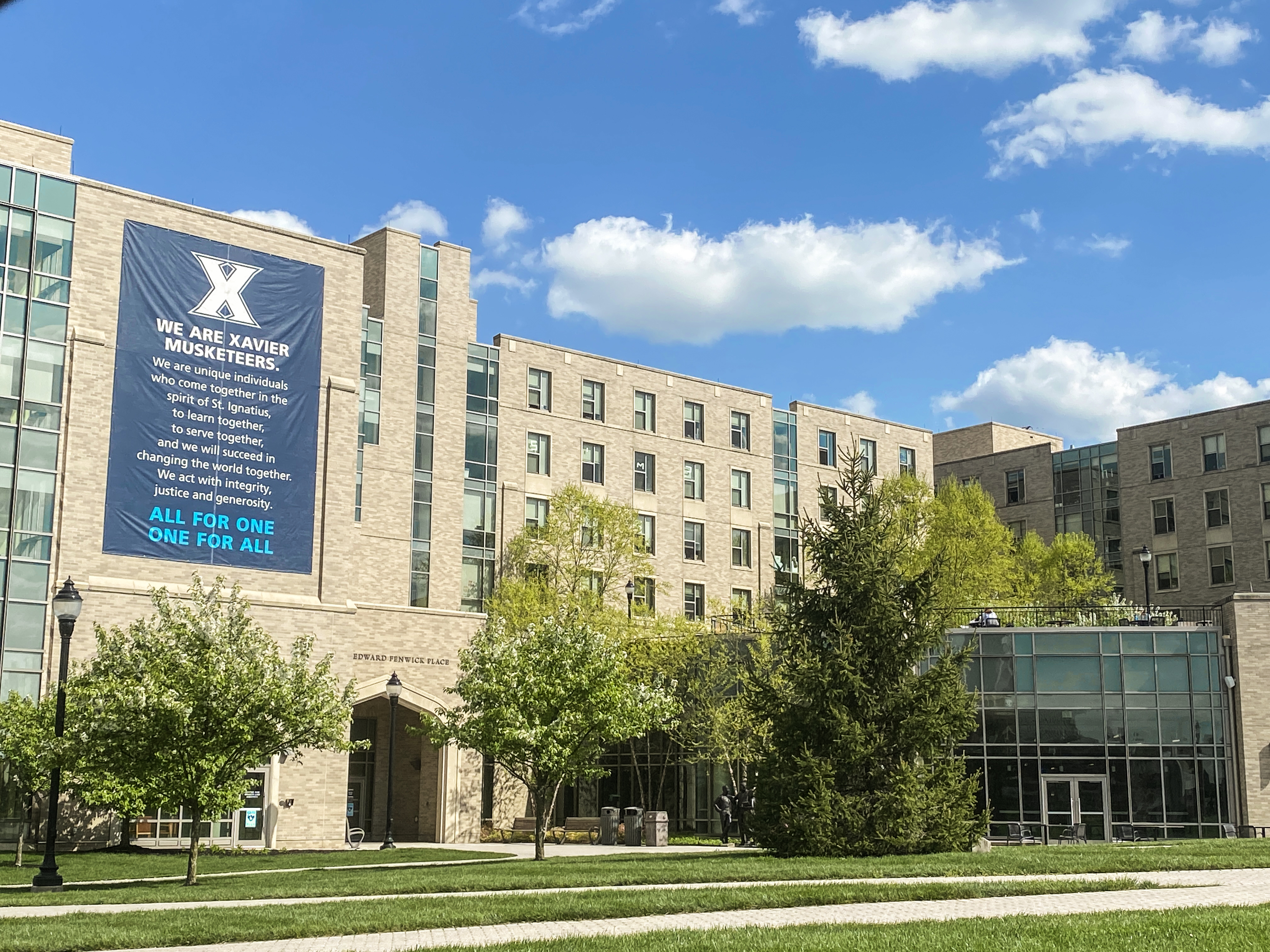
Justice Hall at Xavier University.

Active institutions
School	Location(s)	Control	Type	Enrollment	Founded
Athenaeum of Ohio	Cincinnati	Archdiocese of Cincinnati	Special Focus Four-Year: Faith-Related Institutions	141	1829
Franciscan University of Steubenville	Steubenville	Franciscan Friars	Master's university	2,421	1946
John Carroll University	University Heights	Jesuit	Master's university	3,709	1886
Lourdes University	Sylvania	Franciscan	Master's university	2,035	1958
Mercy College of Ohio	Toledo	Sisters of Mercy	Special-focus institution	688	1917
Mount St. Joseph University	Cincinnati	Sisters of Charity	Master's university	2,300	1920
Ohio Dominican University	Columbus	Dominican Order	Master's university	2,942	1911
Pontifical College Josephinum	Columbus	Dicastery for the Clergy	Special-focus institution	138	1888
University of Dayton	Dayton	Society of Mary	Doctoral/higher research university	11,074	1850
Ursuline College	Pepper Pike	Ursuline Sisters	Master's university	1,180	1871
Walsh University	North Canton	Brothers of Christian Instruction	Master's university	2,500	1958
Xavier University	Cincinnati	Jesuit	Master's university	6,650	1831

== Defunct institutions ==
Defunct institutions
School	Location	Control	Founded	Closed	Ref
Chatfield College	St. Martin	Ursuline Sisters	1971	2023	
Edgecliff College	Cincinnati	Sisters of Mercy	1935	1980; Merged into Xavier University	
Mary Manse College	Toledo	Ursuline Sisters	1922	1975	
Notre Dame College	South Euclid	Sisters of Notre Dame	1922	2024	

== See also ==
- Higher education in the United States
- List of American institutions of higher education
- List of college athletic programs in Ohio
- List of recognized higher education accreditation organizations
- Lists of universities and colleges
- List of colleges and universities by country
