= Ohio Collegiate Athletic Conference =

- Conference: USCAA
- Founded: 2009
- Commissioner: Ronald J Gordon (since 2009)
- Sports fielded: 8; men's: 4; women's: 4
- Division: Division II
- No. of teams: 7
- Region: Ohio

The Ohio Collegiate Athletic Conference was a collegiate athletic conference affiliated with the United States Collegiate Athletic Association (USCAA) that began play as an athletic conference in 2009.

The OCAC was composed of seven colleges and universities throughout Ohio. Those members included Ohio State Marion, Clermont College, Clark State Community College, Southern State Community College, Ohio Christian University, World Harvest Bible College, and Temple Baptist College.

== Sports ==
The OCAC sponsored championships in baseball, basketball, golf, and soccer for men; and in basketball, softball, soccer, and volleyball for women.

== Former members ==
Institution	Location	Team Name	School Colors	Founded	Affiliation	Enrollment	Year Joined
University of Cincinnati Clermont College	Batavia, Ohio	Cougars		1972	Public	3,241	2009
Clark State Community College	Springfield, Ohio	Eagles		1962	Public	3,340	2009
Ohio Christian University	Circleville, Ohio	Trailblazers		1948	Private/Churches of Christ	700	2009
Ohio Mid-Western College (formerly Temple Baptist College)	Sharonville, Ohio	Rams		1972	Private/Baptist	200	2009
Ohio State University, Marion Campus	Marion, Ohio	Scarlet Wave		1957	Public	1,485	2009
Southern State Community College	Hillsboro, Ohio	Patriots		1975	Public	900	2009
Valor Christian College (formerly World Harvest Bible College)	Canal Winchester, Ohio	Warriors		1990	Private/Pentecostal Christian	450	2009
