= Greater Cincinnati Collegiate Connection =

The Greater Cincinnati Collegiate Connection (previously, Greater Cincinnati Consortium of Colleges and Universities), stylized as GC3, was an organization consisting of all of the accredited colleges and universities in the Greater Cincinnati area. The GC3 gave students access to course offerings of the other institutions through a cross-registration arrangement as well as access to library resources of the other schools in the consortium.

Effective July 1, 2025, GC3 was merged into the Strategic Ohio Council for Higher Education ("SOCHE").

== Members prior to merger ==
Institution	State	City	Type	Notes
Art Academy of Cincinnati	Ohio	Cincinnati	Private	
Athenaeum of Ohio	Ohio	Cincinnati	Private	Roman Catholic seminary
Chatfield College	Ohio	St. Martin, Cincinnati	Private	Roman Catholic (Ursulines of Brown County)
Christ College of Nursing & Health Sciences	Ohio	Cincinnati	Private	
Cincinnati Christian University	Ohio	Cincinnati	Private	CCU closed January 2020
Cincinnati State Technical and Community College	Ohio	Cincinnati	Public	
Gateway Community and Technical College	Kentucky	Covington	Public	
God's Bible School and College	Ohio	Cincinnati	Private	Of the Wesleyan-Arminian tradition
Good Samaritan College of Nursing and Health Science	Ohio	Cincinnati	Private	Member of TriHealth, a joint operating agreement between Catholic Health Initiative and Bethesda, Inc.
Hebrew Union College – Jewish Institute of Religion	Ohio	Cincinnati	Private	Reform Jewish seminary with additional locations in New York City, Los Angeles and Jerusalem
Miami University	Ohio	Oxford	Public	Regional campuses: MU Hamilton, MU Middletown
Mount St. Joseph University	Ohio	Mount Saint Joseph, Delhi Township	Private	Roman Catholic (Sisters of Charity of Cincinnati)
Northern Kentucky University	Kentucky	Wilder	Public	
Thomas More University	Kentucky	Crestview Hills	Private	Roman Catholic (Benedictine Sisters)
Union Institute & University	Ohio	Cincinnati	Private	
University of Cincinnati	Ohio	Cincinnati	Public	Regional Campuses: UC Blue Ash, UC Clermont College
Wilmington College	Ohio	Wilmington	Private	Affiliated with the Religious Society of Friends (Quakers)
Xavier University	Ohio	Norwood	Private	Roman Catholic (Jesuit)
