= Clermont College =

Clermont College may refer to:

- Lycée Louis-le-Grand (sometimes nicknamed LLG) is a public secondary school located in Paris, named College of Clermont from its inception in 1563 to its renaming in 1682
- University of Cincinnati Clermont College
