= Strategic Ohio Council for Higher Education =

- Formation: 1967
- Headquarters: Dayton, Ohio
- Coordinates: 39°43′08″N 84°06′35″W
- Website: www.soche.org

Strategic Ohio Council for Higher Education (SOCHE) is a regional consortium in and around the U.S. state of Ohio of colleges, universities, and businesses advancing higher education through academic collaboration, corporate and community partnerships, and student success. It was formed in 1967, renamed in 1984 as the Southwestern Ohio Council for Higher Education, and given its current name in 2021.

== History ==
In January 1967, ten presidents of institutions in the Dayton/Miami Valley area met to discuss collaborative efforts in education and research. Those institutions involved became the founding members of the Dayton-Miami Valley Consortium.

In March 1967, the presidents received a federal grant of $50,000 to develop the Consortium.

In November 1967, the Dayton-Miami Valley Consortium was officially incorporated by the State of Ohio.

In 1984, the Board of Trustees officially changed the name from Dayton-Miami Valley Consortium to the Southwestern Ohio Council for Higher Education. The motivation for this change was the intention to invite members to join the Consortium from a wider region.

In 2021, the organization again changed its name, to Strategic Ohio Council for Higher Education, to better reflect the mission and expanding services that extend beyond Southwestern Ohio.

Effective July 1, 2025, the Greater Cincinnati Collegiate Connection (stylized as “GC3”), having 15 colleges and universities, was merged into SOCHE with its 23 institutions. SOCHE is to continue to supply similar services to its newly-expanded roster of institutions.

USASpending.gov, an official U.S. Government website, indicates SOCHE has received $3.1 million in federal funding over time up to 2026.

The Dayton Daily News has routinely reported on SOCHE and its leadership.

== Member colleges and institutions ==
SOCHE members are:

- Air Force Institute of Technology
- Antioch College
- Antioch University
- Art Academy of Cincinnati
- Cedarville University
- Central State University
- The Chatfield Edge
- Christ College of Nursing & Health Sciences
- Cincinnati State Technical and Community College
- Clark State College
- Edison State Community College
- Franklin University
- God's Bible School and College
- Good Samaritan College of Nursing and Health Science
- Hebrew Union College – Jewish Institute of Religion
- Kettering College
- Kettering Foundation
- Miami University
- Mount St. Joseph University
- Northern Kentucky University
- Ohio University
- Shawnee State University
- Sinclair Community College
- Southern State Community College
- Thomas More University
- University of Cincinnati
- University of Cincinnati Blue Ash College
- University of Cincinnati Clermont College
- University of Dayton
- Walsh University
- Wilberforce University
- Wilmington College
- Wittenberg University
- Wright State University
- Xavier University

== Programs ==
The Student Research Program provides research internships for approximately 90 undergraduate and graduate science and engineering students at Wright-Patterson Air Force Base in the Materials and Manufacturing Directorate and the Air Force Institute of Technology. With an $8.5 million award from the U.S. Air Force to the Southwestern Ohio Council for Higher Education's (SOCHE) Student Research Program, area colleges and universities will continue to produce undergraduate and graduate student research internships.

Numerous independent news sources, including the Wilmington News Journal, the Fairborn Daily Herald, the Yellow Springs News, Miami Valley Today, the Springfield News-Sun, and the Xenia Daily Gazette, have regularly reported SOCHE activity in honoring academic personnel with Excellence Awards.

SOCHE offers a Cross-Registration Program which allows degree-seeking students at SOCHE-member institutions to take graduate or undergraduate courses at other SOCHE institutions, and have the course credit applied at their home institutions toward their degrees.

The Ohio Governor’s Office of Workforce Transformation announced in 2025 that, with respect to the state’s High School Tech Internship program which offers employers wage reimbursement for hosting high school interns in tech-related roles, that SOCHE is the selected intermediary for northwest and western Ohio. The Thomas B. Fordham Institute has reported that such tech internship programs are more successful when run through intermediary organizations like SOCHE.

The Greater Dayton Area Hospital Association (GDAHA) says SOCHE is its leading partner in the Western Ohio Healthcare Industry Sector Partnership, an effort to improve and advance Ohio’s Healthcare workforce environment.

BestColleges, reporting on Ohio’s student debt forgiveness program called the Be Ohio’s Latest Degree holder (BOLD) compact, indicates SOCHE is spearheading the compact.

The Mercer County Outlook noted a grant to SOCHE from CenterPoint Energy Foundation to support SOCHE’s Work-Based Learning for All program, which provides 50% funding tor paid work-based learning experiences for students.

The Yellow Springs Community Foundation reports that its Roads to Recovery program, which provides services to families impacted by Autism Spectrum Disorders, partners with SOCHE to provide paid work for student clients to assemble educational kits for use in local schools.

== Partnership ==
- Midwestern Higher Education Compact
