= Paige Williams =

Paige Williams may refer to:

- Paige Williams (artist) (born 1965), American artist
- Paige Williams (author), American journalist and author
- Paige Williams (footballer) (born 1995), English football player
