= The Christ Hospital =

Geography
- Location: Cincinnati, Ohio, United States

Services
- Emergency department: Yes
- Beds: 555

Helipads
- Helipad: FAA LID: OH49

History
- Founded: 1889

Links
- Website: http://www.thechristhospital.com/
- Lists: Hospitals in Ohio

The Christ Hospital is a 555-bed, not-for-profit acute care facility in Cincinnati, Ohio, offering services in cardiovascular care, spine treatment, women's health, major surgery, cancer, behavioral medicine, orthopaedics, emergency care, kidney transplant and others. The Christ Hospital is consistently recognized by U.S. News & World Report as one of the nation's top 50 hospitals in several categories.

== History ==
The Christ Hospital traces its origins to 1888, when a group of Cincinnati civic and religious leaders, including James Gamble, invited Methodist missionary Isabella Thoburn to Cincinnati to help establish an institution for the training of deaconesses and missionaries. In 1889, Thoburn opened a 10-bed hospital called Christ's Hospital in Cincinnati's West End. The hospital moved to Mount Auburn in 1893, opened a nursing school in 1902, and was renamed The Christ Hospital in 1904.

== Recognition ==
In the 2025–2026 U.S. News & World Report Best Hospitals rankings, The Christ Hospital was ranked No. 1 in the Cincinnati region for the eleventh consecutive year and tied for No. 3 in Ohio. The hospital was also rated high performing in two adult specialties and 21 procedures and conditions.

== See also ==
- Christ College of Nursing & Health Sciences
