= Christ College of Nursing & Health Sciences =

Private nursing school in Cincinnati, Ohio, US

Coordinates: 39.1211°N 84.5103°W

The Christ College of Nursing & Health Sciences
- Former name: Christ Hospital School of Nursing
- Type: Private non-profit
- Established: 1902
- Affiliations: The Christ Hospital Health Network
- Students: 765
- Location: 2139 Auburn Avenue, Cincinnati, Ohio, 45219, United States
- Campus: Urban
- Website: thechristcollege.edu

The Christ College of Nursing & Health Sciences is an American private nonprofit nursing school located in Cincinnati, Ohio. It was founded in 1902 and is affiliated with The Christ Hospital Health Network. The college has more than 7,000 graduates.

== History ==
The Christ Hospital School of Nursing was founded in 1902 in Cincinnati, Ohio. The school was affiliated with The Christ Hospital Health Network and continues that relationship today. The college became The Christ College of Nursing and Health Sciences in 2006. It is a private non-profit nursing school.

As of 2025, the college has graduated 7,000 nurses.

== Campus ==
Christ College of Nursing & Health Science is located on the main campus of The Christ Hospital. Its address is 2139 Auburn Avenue in Cincinnati, Ohio.

== Academics ==
The Christ College of Nursing & Health Sciences offers a Bachelor of Science in nursing and healthcare administration. It offers an Associate of Science in diagnostic medical sonography, radiography, and general studies. It also offers a certificate in clinical medical assisting. U.S. News & World Report ranked Christ College of Nursing & Health Science at #624 of 686 nursing schools in the United States for 2026.

The Christ College of Nursing & Health Sciences is accredited by Higher Learning Commission. In addition, its Bachelor of Science in nursing program is accredited by the Commission on Collegiate Nursing Education.

The college has a chapter of Sigma Theta Tau honor society for nursing.

The institution is a member of the Strategic Ohio Council for Higher Education (SOCHE).

== Students ==
In 2024, The Christ College of Nursing & Health Science had 765 undergraduate students. Of those students, 91 percent were women and 9 percent were male. The student body was 72 percent White, 17 percent Black, 4 percent Asian, 3 percent Hispanic, and 3 percent unknown.

== Notable alumni ==
- Cordelia E. Cook, combat nurse in the United States Army Nurse Corps during World War II; first woman to receive both the Bronze Star Medal and the Purple Heart

== See also ==
- Greater Cincinnati Collegiate Connection
- List of nursing schools in the United States
