= Paige Williams (artist) =

American painter and drafter

- Born: September 7, 1965 (age 61)
- Education: University of Cincinnati
- Known for: Painting
- Website: paigewilliams.net

Paige Williams (born 1965) is an American painter, drafter, educator, and the current chair of the studio program at the Art Academy of Cincinnati.

== Biography ==
Born and raised in Lexington, Kentucky, Williams attended Eastern Kentucky University where she achieved a Bachelor of Fine Arts degree. She received her MFA in painting from the University of Cincinnati, after spending time in Bregenz, Austria, through the Kentucky Institute for International Studies.

== Work ==
=== Academic career ===
Williams has worked for and taught at Northern Kentucky University, the Art Academy of Cincinnati, and the Taft Museum in Cincinnati, Ohio. She is currently the chair of the studio program at the Art Academy of Cincinnati.

Additionally, Williams has held visiting artist and lecturer positions at Great Oaks in Cincinnati, Ohio, at the University of Alaska, and at the University of Michigan.

Williams has held many professional affiliations and honors. In 2008, Williams received the Ohio Arts Council's Individual Creativity Excellence Award, and in 2009, she received the Greater Cincinnati Consortium of Colleges and Universities' Excellence in Teaching Award. Williams served on a panel of experts for the School for Creative and Performing Arts in 2013.

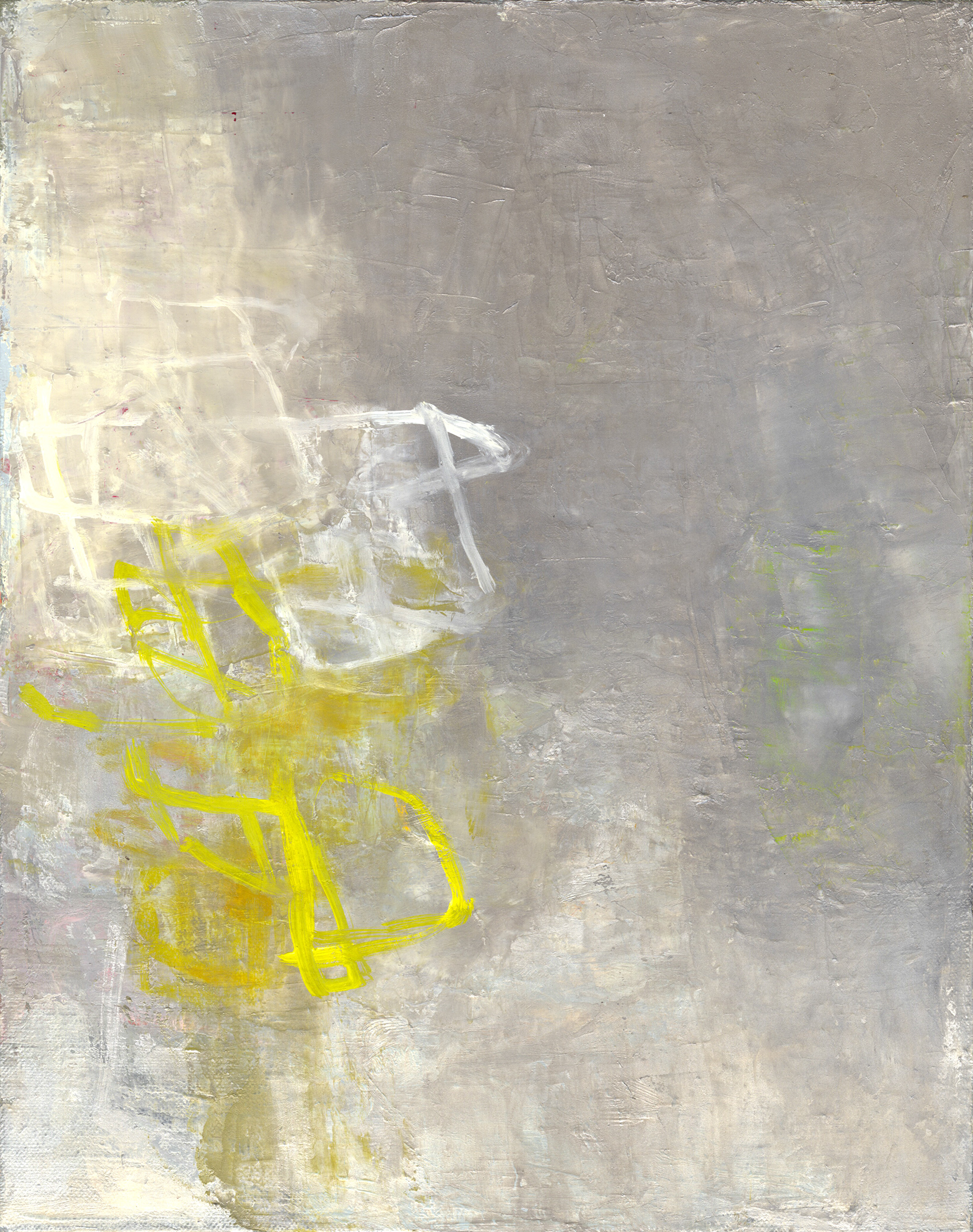
"Mistaken for a Threat." Oil on Linen. 14" x 11". 2015.

=== Works and exhibitions ===
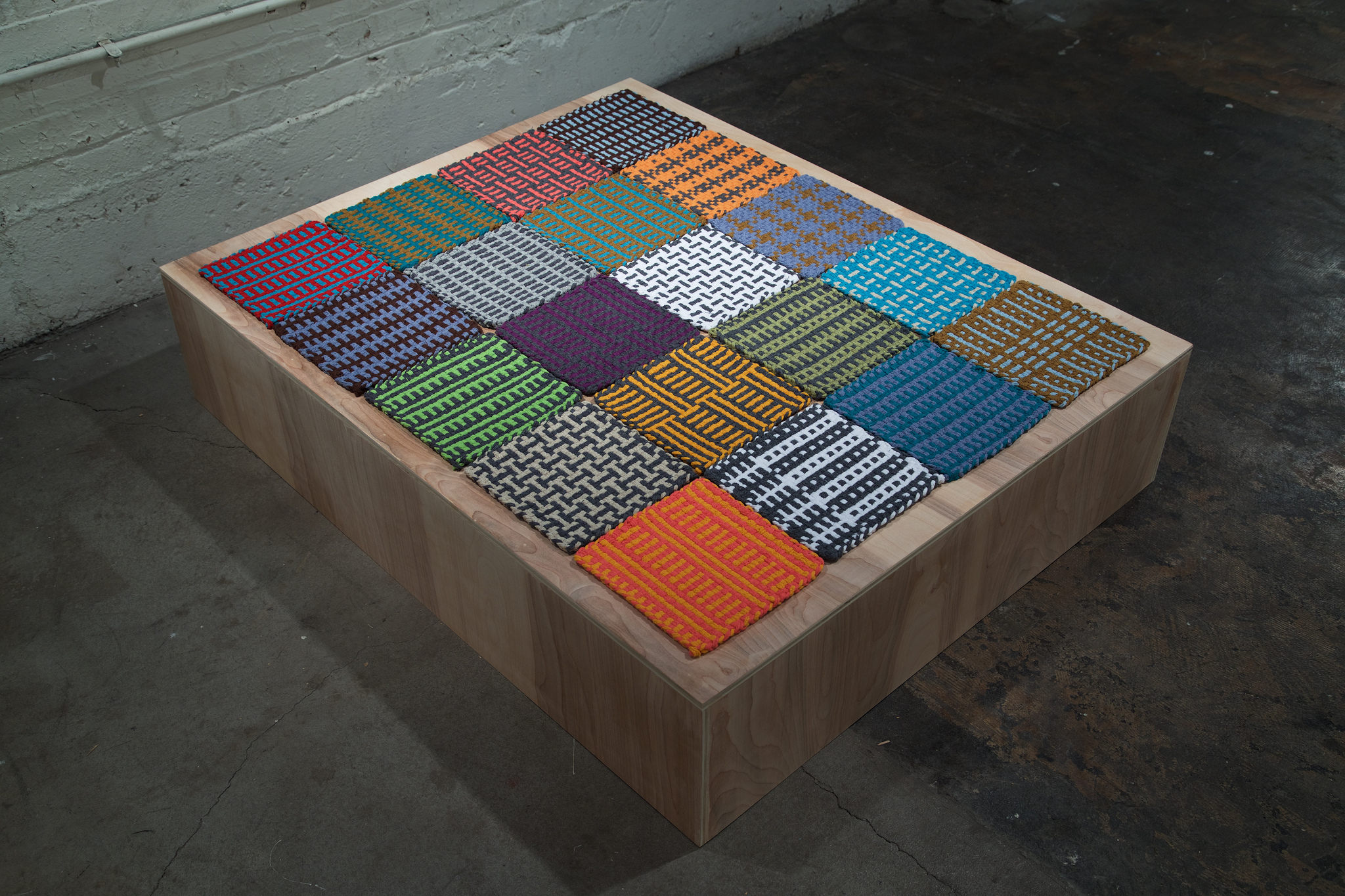
"Sometimes to Touch." Plywood and Cotton. 10" x 37" x 47". 2016.

Beginning with real-life references, Williams works in abstraction using a number of media including mylar, phone books, and oil, acrylic, latex, and enamel paint. Some references she has used are her son's clothes, drawings, toys, and books. Williams is interested in the mindset of a child, stating in an interview in 2004: "I am attracted to the deliberate marks made by a child, and the images in children's books that are similarly direct". In addition to the theme of children's marks, grids appear in Williams' work again and again. She believes that the grid is a symbol for the home: "the grids reference a lot of domestic things, like windows, doors, quilts, nets and ladders".

==== "Working Space" ====
In 2001, along with Keith Benjamin, Mark Fox, Stewart Goldman, and Kim Krause, Williams attended a three-week artist residency entitled "Working Space" in Munich, Germany. "Working Space," displayed at the Art Gallery of the Munich City Hall, was "a concept that aim[ed] at an intensive intercommunication between the artist and the beholder of the work of arts". Williams invited visitors to participate in the process of creating artwork.

==== 1407 Chase - The Square House ====
In 2014–2015, Williams participated with a group of artists in a project by artist Mark deJong called "The Square House". deJong purchased a home in Cincinnati and invited various area artists to make work around the theme of a square. Williams' contribution was an abstract color block pattern around an internal archway.

==== Other selected exhibitions ====
- 2004 - "In Thrall," Rike Center Gallery, Dayton, OH
- 2005 - "Scenarios, Situations and Circumstances: Paintings and Works on Paper," Weston Art Gallery, Cincinnati, OH
- 2006 - "Growing Pains: Ohio Artists Explore Life's Journey," Riffe Gallery, Columbus, OH
- 2009 - "She Keeps It in Play /They Don't Know What to Call It," Semantic Gallery, Cincinnati, OH
- 2010 - "Space Between, Paige Williams and Karen Schifano," Blank Space Gallery, New York, NY
- 2013 - "Ice Water Flyswatter," Tiger Strikes Asteroid, Philadelphia, PA
