= Cordelia E. Cook =

American combat nurse (1919–1996)

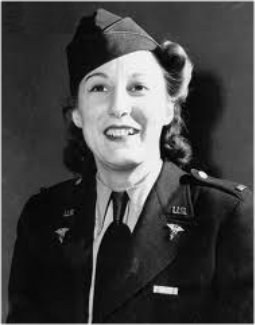
- First Lieutenant Cordelia Cook 1945
- Born: Cordelia Elizabeth Cook; March 17, 1919; Fort Thomas, Kentucky, U.S.
- Died: June 19, 1996 (aged 77); Upper Arlington, Ohio, U.S.
- Resting place: Evergreen Cemetery, Southgate, Campbell County, Kentucky, US
- Other name: Betty Cook
- Occupation: registered nurse

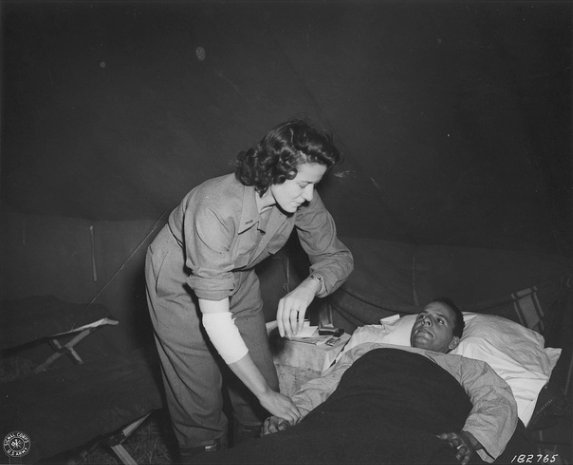
Cook tending a wounded serviceman in 1943, showing her shrapnel wound, for which she received a Purple Heart award

Cordelia Elizabeth Cook (March 17, 1919 – June 19, 1996) was an American combat nurse in the United States Army Nurse Corps during World War II. She was the first woman to receive both the Bronze Star Medal award and the Purple Heart.

== Early life ==
Cook was born on March 17, 1919, in Fort Thomas Kentucky. Her father was Louis Cook, chief of police in Fort Thomas. She went by the name "Betty".

Cook graduated from Highlands High School in Fort Thomas. She then attended the Christ Hospital School of Nursing in Cincinnati, Ohio, graduating in 1940.

== Career ==
After college, Cook was a nurse at The Christ Hospital in Cincinnati, Ohio, for one year. She enlisted in the United States Army Nurse Corps as a surgical nurse. She trained at various Army medical posts in the United States. She earned the rank of first lieutenant, eventually becoming a lieutenant colonel.

Cook was a combat nurse during World War II. She was initially assigned to the North African Theater of Operations. She was with the medical units that followed the invasion of Sicily in 1943. Her unit received a citation for "bravery under fire" in Sicily. Her unit then followed United Nations forces into mainland Italy.

In 1944, she was transferred to the 11th Field Hospital in the Presenzano sector at the Italian front. This was an especially dangerous location, being close to the front. She received a Bronze Star Medal for her service there, being the first woman to receive this award.

Soon afterwards, she was wounded by shrapnel when the Germans bombed the hospital. As a result, she received a Purple Heart. She was the first women to received both the Bronze Star and the Purple Heart.

After recovering from her injuries, she was stationed with General Patche's Seventh Army.

After the war, Cook was a nurse at the Doctors Hospital North in Columbus, Ohio for 28 years.

== Personal life ==
Cook married Harold E. Fillmore, a U.S. Army captain, in Camp Carson, Colorado, in March 1943. Cook and Fillmore met in Fort Thomas, Kentucky, before the war. The couple had a daughter and two sons.

Cook died on June 19, 1996, in Upper Arlington, Ohio. She was buried in Evergreen Cemetery in Southgate, Kentucky.
