= St. Martin, Ohio =

- Unincorporated community
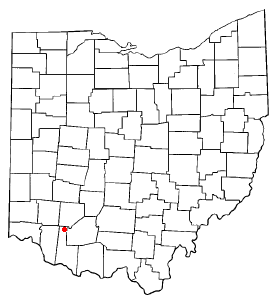
- Location of St. Martin, Ohio
- Coordinates: 39°12′38″N 83°52′45″W
- Country: United States
- State: Ohio
- County: Brown
- Township: Perry

Area
  - Total: 1.94 sq mi (5.02 km^{2})
  - Land: 1.94 sq mi (5.02 km^{2})
  - Water: 0 sq mi (0.00 km^{2})
- Elevation: 971 ft (296 m)

Population (2020)
  - Total: 200
  - Density: 103.2/sq mi (39.86/km^{2})
- Time zone: UTC-5 (Eastern (EST))
  - Summer (DST): UTC-4 (EDT)
- FIPS code: 39-69666
- GNIS feature ID: 2725568

St. Martin is an unincorporated community and former village in Brown County, Ohio, United States. The community is served by the Fayetteville (45118) post office. The population was 200 at the 2020 census. In November 2011, voters chose to unincorporate St. Martin, and it now falls solely under the jurisdiction of Perry Township.

== Geography ==
According to the 2010 census, the village had a total area of 1.09 square miles (2.82 km^{2}), all land.

== Demographics ==
Historical population
Census	Pop.	Note	%±
2000	91		—
2010	129		41.8%
2020	200		55.0%
U.S. Decennial Census

=== 2010 census ===
As of the census of 2010, there were 129 people, 47 households, and 36 families living in the village. The population density was 118.3 inhabitants per square mile (45.7/km^{2}). There were 50 housing units at an average density of 45.9 per square mile (17.7/km^{2}). The racial makeup of the village was 99.2% White and 0.8% from two or more races.

There were 47 households, out of which 29.8% had children under the age of 18 living with them, 72.3% were married couples living together, 2.1% had a female householder with no husband present, 2.1% had a male householder with no wife present, and 23.4% were non-families. 14.9% of all households were made up of individuals, and 10.7% had someone living alone who was 65 years of age or older. The average household size was 2.66 and the average family size was 2.97.

The median age in the village was 49.2 years. 19.4% of residents were under the age of 18; 6.2% were between the ages of 18 and 24; 16.3% were from 25 to 44; 42.7% were from 45 to 64; and 15.5% were 65 years of age or older. The gender makeup of the village was 48.8% male and 51.2% female.

=== 2000 census ===
As of the census of 2000, there were 91 people, 32 households, and 28 families living in the village. The population density was 78.3 inhabitants per square mile (30.2/km^{2}). There were 34 housing units at an average density of 29.3 per square mile (11.3/km^{2}). The racial makeup of the village was 100.00% White. Hispanic or Latino of any race were 1.10% of the population.

There were 32 households, out of which 40.6% had children under the age of 18 living with them, 81.3% were married couples living together, 6.3% had a female householder with no husband present, and 12.5% were non-families. 12.5% of all households were made up of individuals, and 6.3% had someone living alone who was 65 years of age or older. The average household size was 2.84 and the average family size was 3.11.

In the village the population was spread out, with 28.6% under the age of 18, 6.6% from 18 to 24, 26.4% from 25 to 44, 30.8% from 45 to 64, and 7.7% who were 65 years of age or older. The median age was 40 years. For every 100 females, there were 102.2 males. For every 100 females age 18 and over, there were 103.1 males.

The median income for a household in the village was $60,417, and the median income for a family was $60,833. Males had a median income of $33,750 versus $28,125 for females. The per capita income for the village was $18,833. None of the population and none of the families were below the poverty line.

== Gallery ==
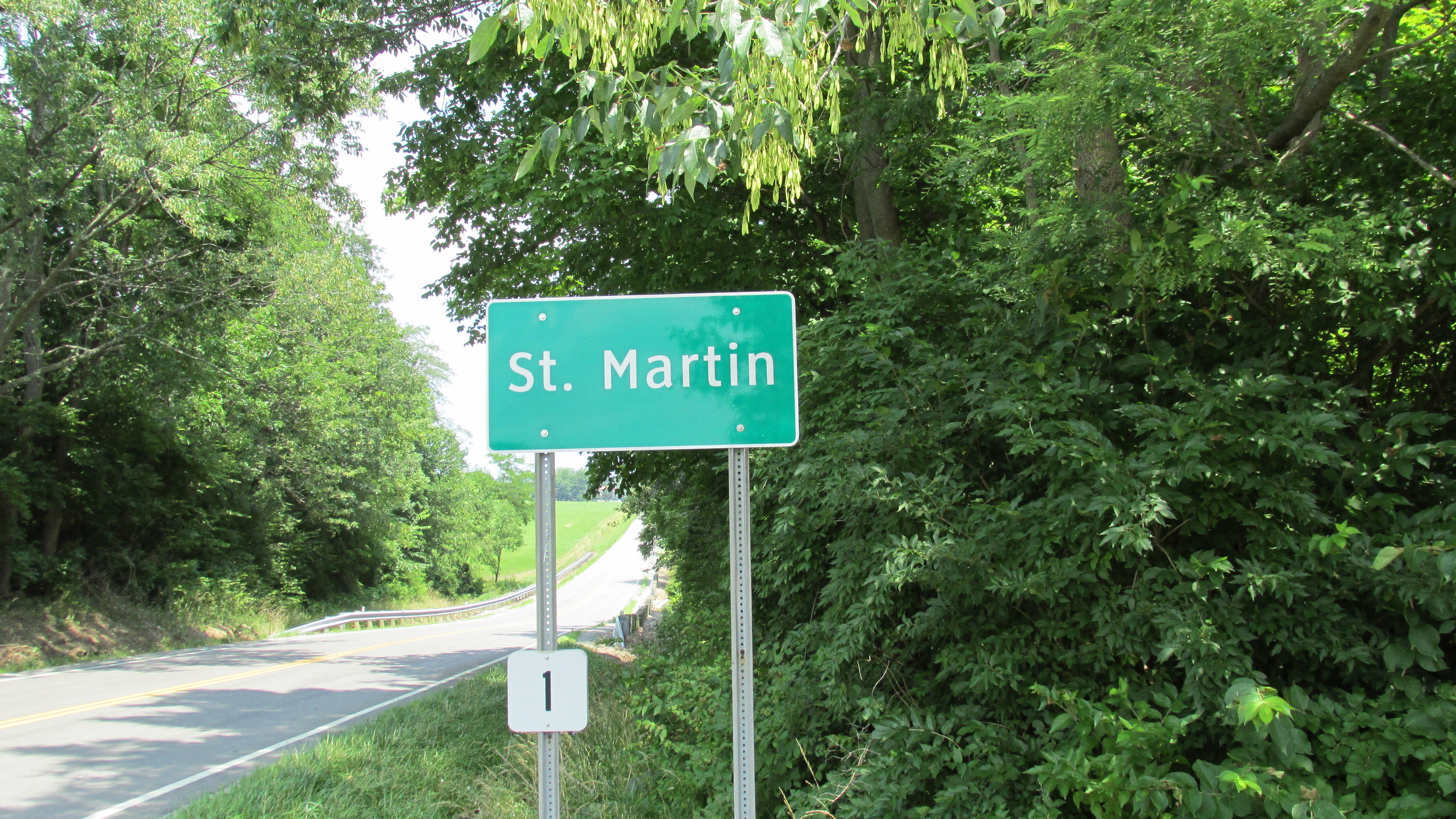
St. Martin sign

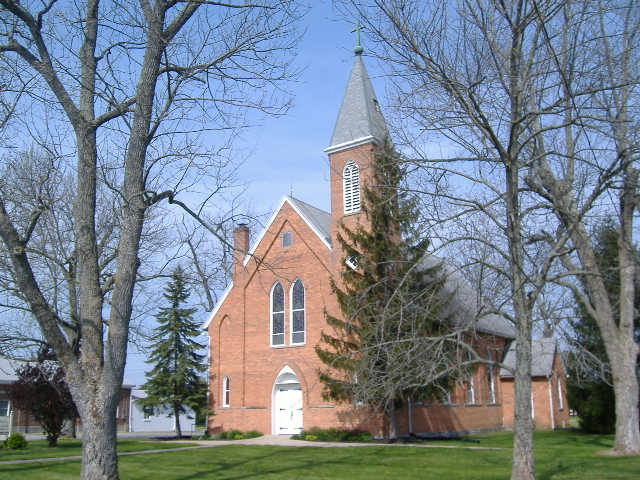
St. Angela Merici Catholic Church

== See also ==
- Chatfield College
