= Southern State Community College =

Multi-campus college in Hillsboro, Ohio, U.S.

Coordinates: 39.2339°N 83.6181°W

- Former names: Southern State General and Technical College
- Type: Public community college
- Established: 1975; 51 years ago
- Parent institution: University System of Ohio
- President: Nicole Roades
- Students: 2,722
- Location: Hillsboro, Ohio, United States
- Colors: Blue, Red, Orange, & Green
- Nickname: Patriots
- Website: https://www.sscc.edu/

Southern State Community College (SSCC) is a public community college based in Hillsboro, Ohio, United States. SSCC has two campuses, with one in Mount Orab ("Brown County campus") and the other in Hillsboro ("Central campus"). Southern State Community College was founded in February 1975 as Southern State General and Technical College. The name of the school was changed only a few years later in 1977 to the name by which it is known now. The institution is a member of the Strategic Ohio Council for Higher Education (SOCHE).

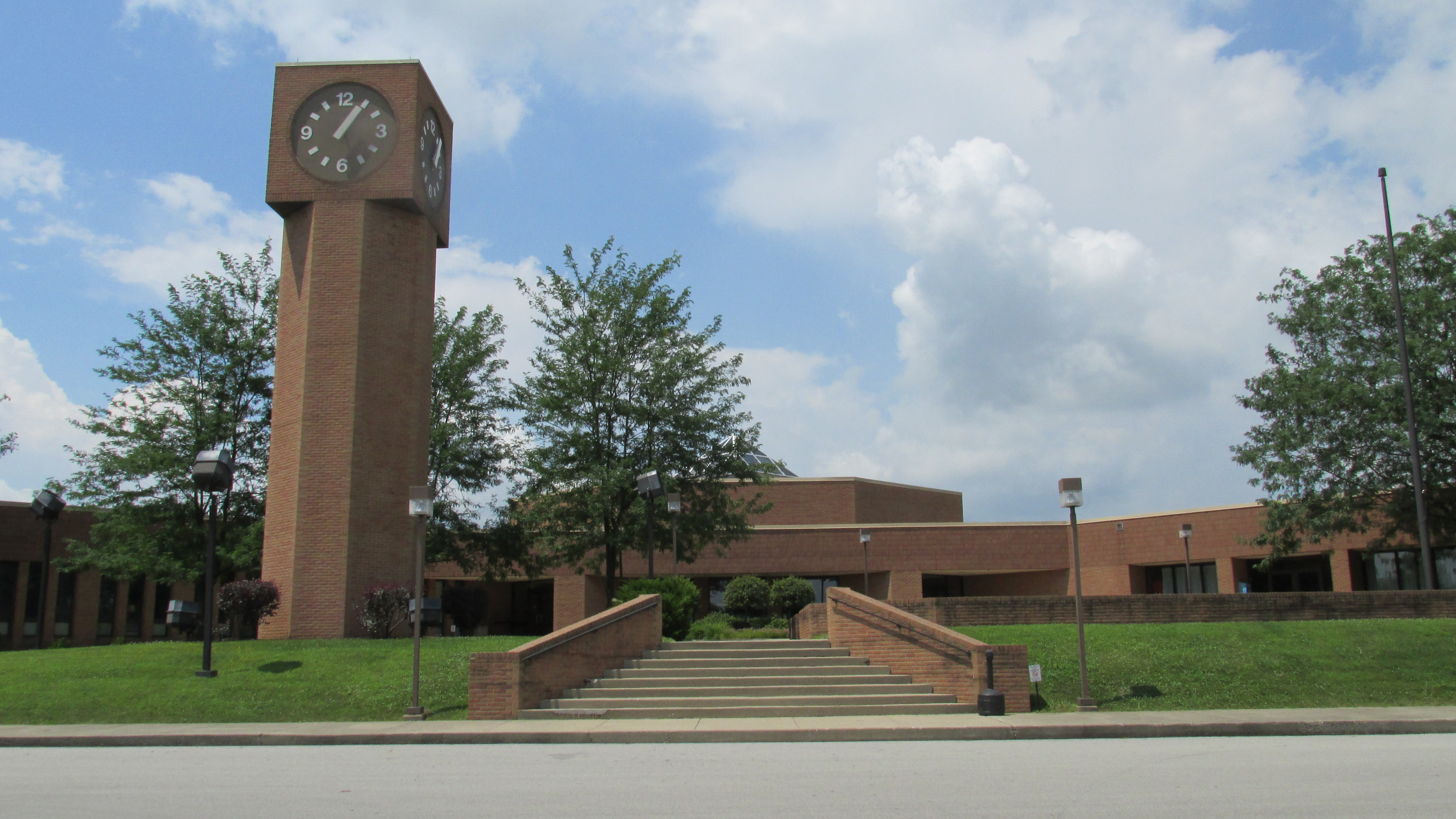
Central Campus

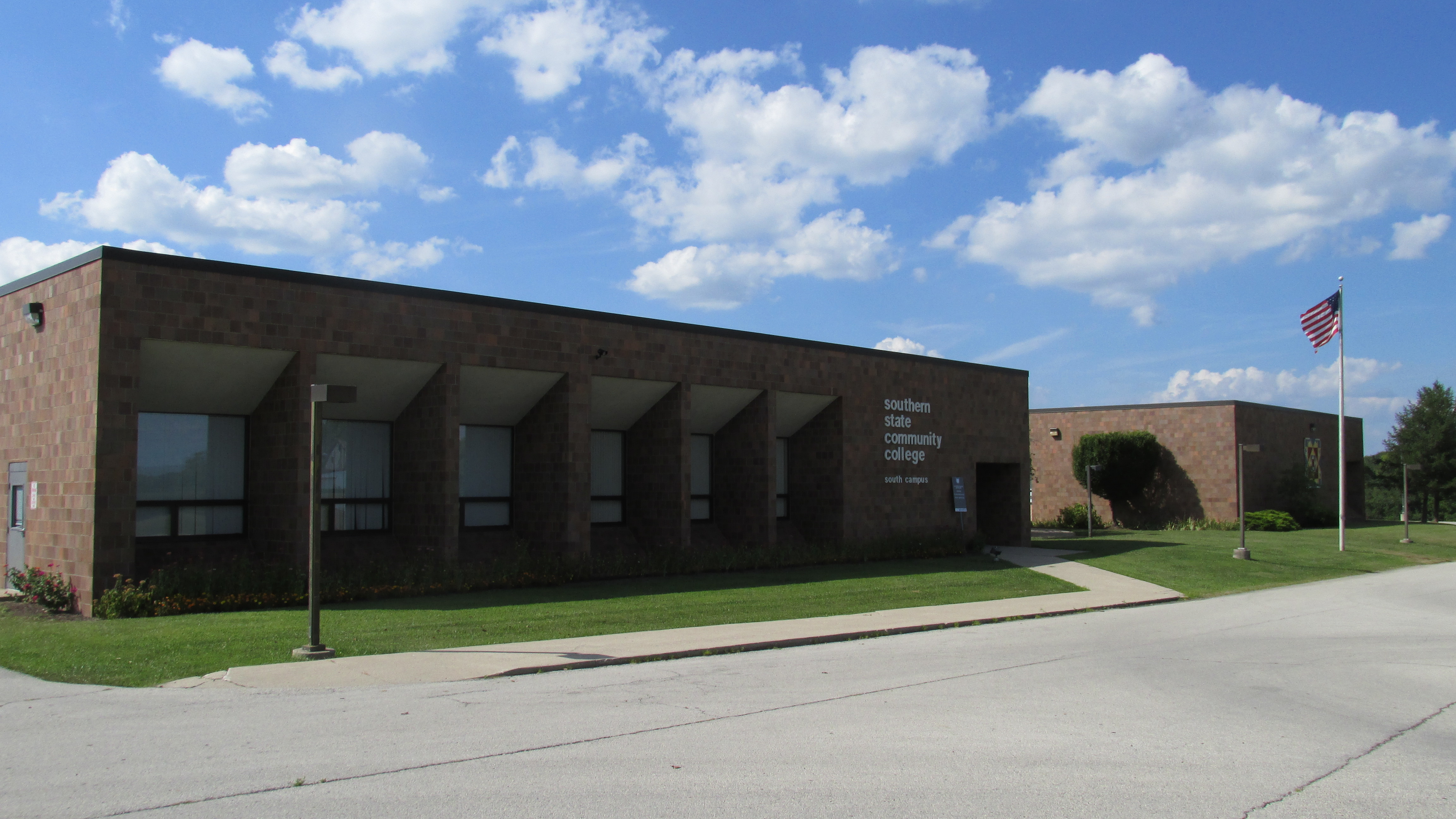
Brown County Campus
