= Chatfield College =

Private Catholic college in Ohio, U.S.

Coordinates: 39°12′36″N 83°53′20″W

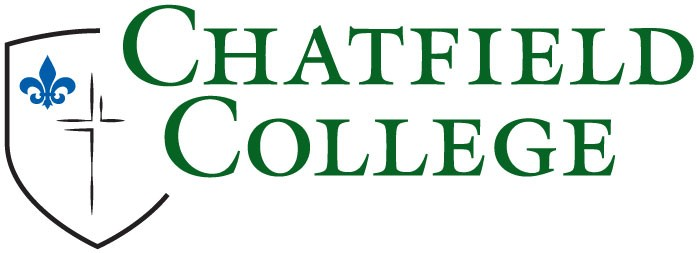
- Motto: Achieve A Better Future Here
- Type: Private college
- Established: 1971
- Accreditation: HLC
- Religious affiliation: Roman Catholic
- Academic affiliations: ACCU; SOCHE; NAICU; UEN
- President: Robert P. Elmore
- Location: St. Martin and Cincinnati, Ohio, United States
- Website: chatfield.edu

Chatfield College was a private Catholic college in St. Martin and Cincinnati, Ohio, United States. Chatfield was founded by the Ursulines of Brown County in 1971. Chatfield offered the Associate of Arts and Associate of Applied Science degrees. The college was accredited by the Higher Learning Commission.

== The Chatfield Edge ==
Chatfield College ceased operations as a college in January 2023. It transitioned into a non-profit organization called The Chatfield Edge, designed to support non-traditional and first-generation college students in Southwest Ohio. It is a member of the Strategic Ohio Council for Higher Education (SOCHE).

== Gallery ==
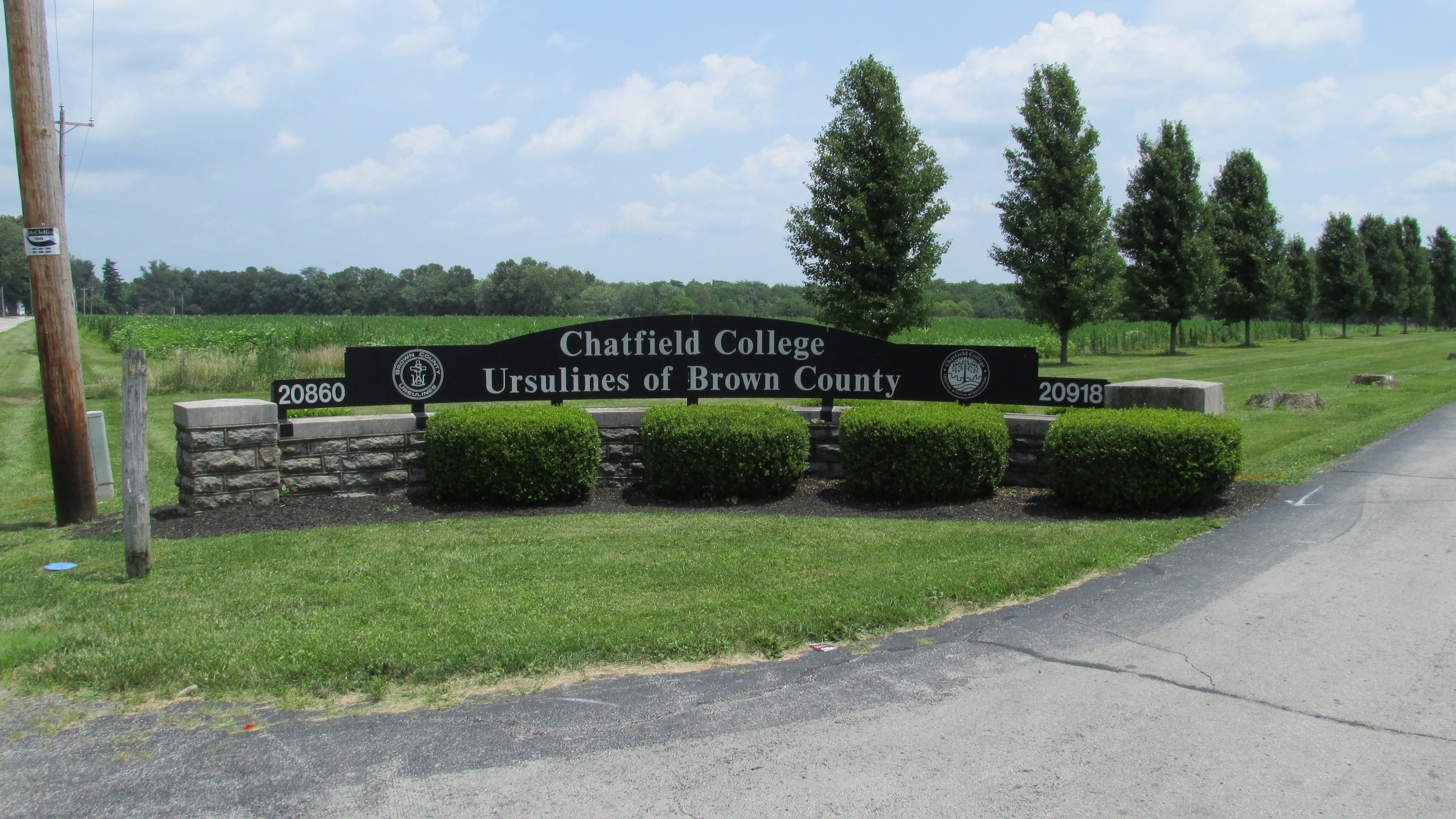
Chatfield College entrance (St. Martin)

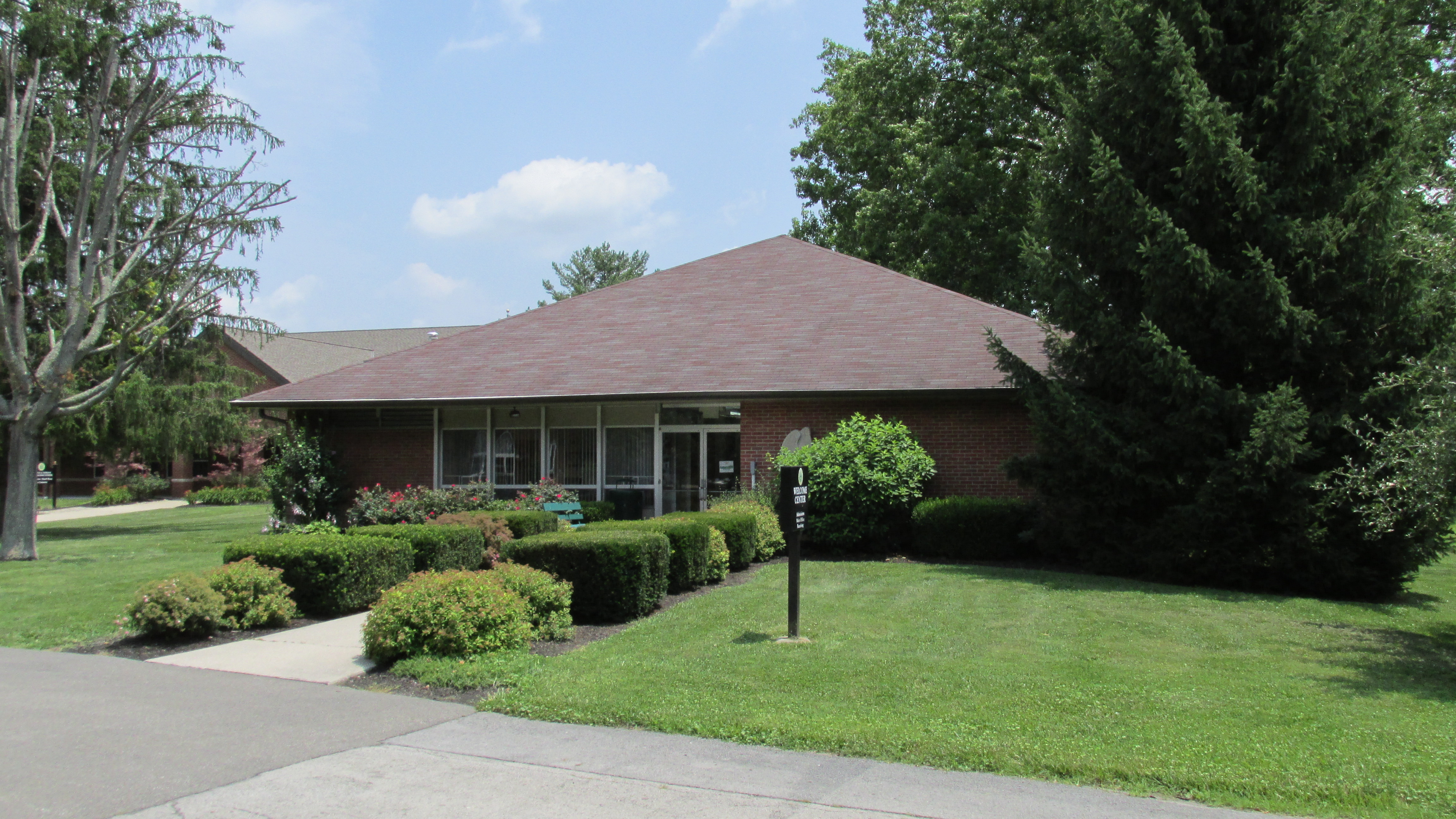
Welcome Center (St. Martin)

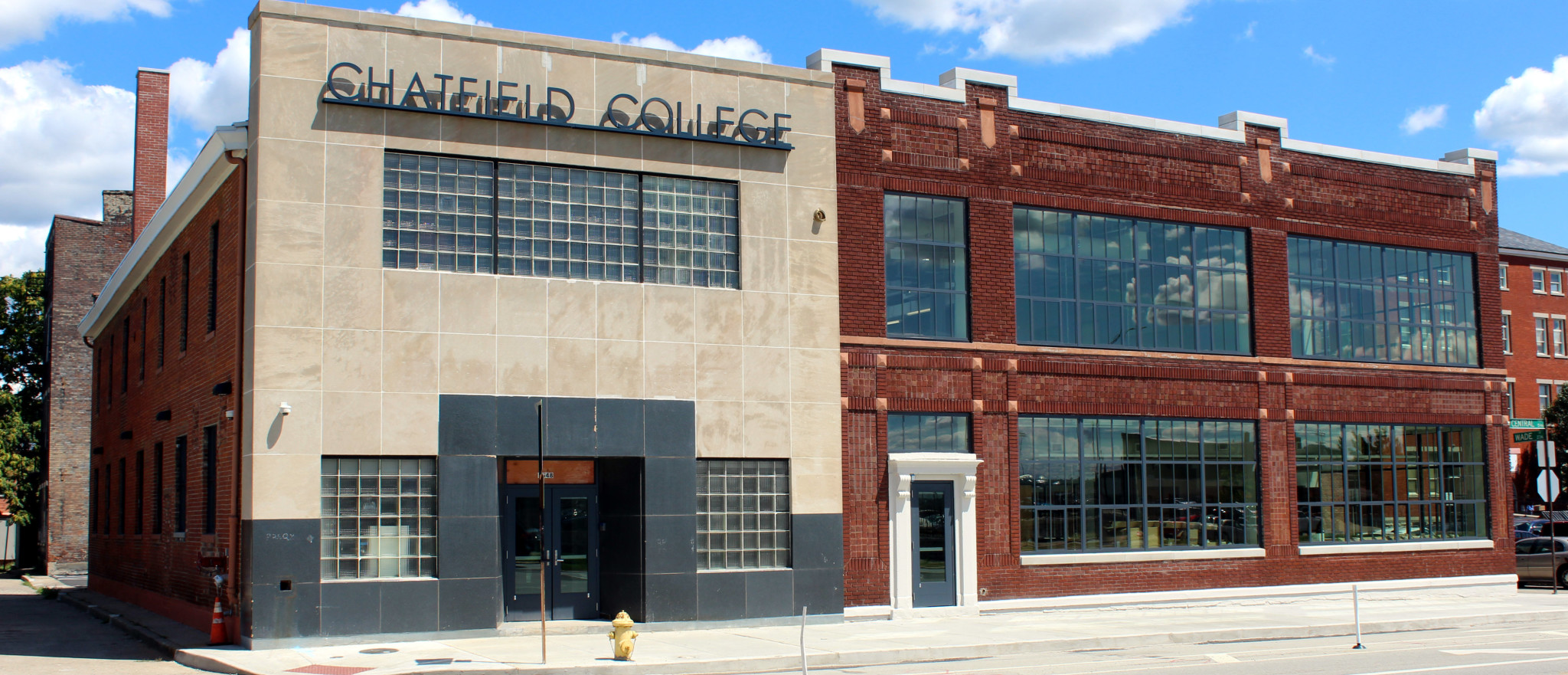
Exterior view of the Cincinnati campus
