= University of Cincinnati Clermont College =

Regional public college in Batavia, Ohio, US

Coordinates: 39°4′50″N 84°11′44″W

- UC East campus
- Type: Public satellite campus
- Established: 1972; 54 years ago
- Parent institution: University of Cincinnati
- Affiliations: USCAA Division II
- Dean: Jeffrey C. Bauer
- Faculty: 298
- Students: 2,840 (Fall 2023)
- Location: Batavia, Ohio, United States
- Colors: Red & Black
- Mascot: Cougars
- Website: ucclermont.edu

The University of Cincinnati Clermont College (UC Clermont) is a satellite campus of the University of Cincinnati with its main campus in Batavia, Ohio.

UC Clermont is an open admissions institution, providing access to higher education to anyone with a high school diploma or equivalency. Clermont College's rolling admissions policy allows students to enroll any academic semester: autumn, spring or summer.

UC Clermont sponsors a variety of fine arts, including the Calico Children's Theatre and the Park National Bank Art Gallery. Additionally, the UC Clermont College Krueger Auditorium is also the home of the Clermont Philharmonic Orchestra.

UC Clermont had its own satellite campus, UC East, which opened in 2010 but closed in 2020 due to increased online enrollment.

== History ==
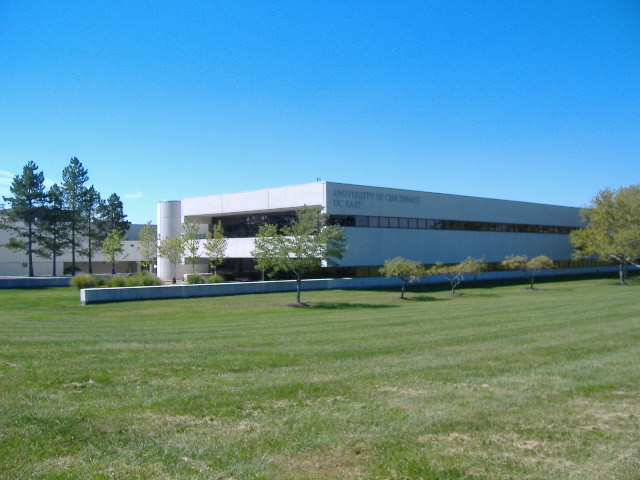
The former UC East building

The college opened in 1972 and offers more than fifty associate degree and certificate programs and two bachelor's degree programs. Students that begin their degree at UC Clermont have the opportunity to transition to main campus to complete their degree.

In 2010 select programs at the Clermont campus moved to a new campus, known as UC East, located off of State Route 32 at the former Batavia Transmission plant, due to Clermont College's recent enrollment growth. However, due to prolonged declining enrollment at UC Clermont, UC East was closed and is vacated as of 2020.

== Athletics ==
UC Clermont athletics teams are known as the "Cougars" and participate as a member of the United States Collegiate Athletic Association (USCAA). Currently independent, they were previously members of the now defunct Ohio Collegiate Athletic Conference (OCAC). The college currently sponsors six teams including men's and women's basketball, men's and women's soccer, men's baseball, and women's volleyball. Previous sports include women's softball, tennis, and golf.

Eleven USCAA National Championships
2007 USCAA Division II Men's Basketball National Championship
2013 USCAA Men's Baseball Small College World Series
2014 USCAA Division II Women's Basketball National Championship
2018 USCAA Division II Women's Soccer National Championship
2019 USCAA Division II Women's Soccer National Championship
2021 USCAA Division II Women's Volleyball National Championship
2023 USCAA Division II Women's Basketball National Championship
2023 USCAA Division II Women's Soccer National Championship
2024 USCAA Men's Baseball Small College World Series
2024 USCAA Division II Women's Soccer National Championship
2025 USCAA Division II Women's Volleyball National Championship

Individual Awards
2018 USCAA DII Women's Soccer Player of the Year - Taylor Greene
2018 USCAA DII Women's Volleyball Coach of the Year - Josh Hamer
2019 USCAA Baseball Student Athlete of the Year - AJ Sweatland
2019 USCAA DII Women's Volleyball Player of the Year - Kelsie Holland
2020 USCAA DII Men's Basketball Coach of the Year - Steve Ellis
2022 USCAA DII Women's Volleyball Player of the Year - Isabella Melotik
2022 USCAA DII Men's Soccer Player of the Year - Alex McAfee
2022 USCAA DII Men's Soccer Coach of the Year - Avery Patton
2023 USCAA Garth Pleasant Athletic Director of the Year - Brian Sullivan
2024 USCAA DII Women's Basketball Player of the Year - Tyra Murphy
2024 USCAA DII Men's Basketball Coach of the Year - Steve Ellis
2024 USCAA DII Women's Soccer Student Athlete of the Year - Taylor Myers
2024 USCAA DII Women's Soccer Player of the Year - Molly Ennis
2025 USCAA DII Women's Volleyball Player of the Year - Kaitlyn Finnigan
2025 USCAA DII Women's Soccer Player of the Year - Kaylee Rose

Athletic Facilities
Student Activities Center (SAC)
Also referred to as the "Cougar Dome", the SAC was brought to UC Clermont by Dean David Devier after he saw it being used as a temporary athletic facility during renovations at the University of Cincinnati. Dedicated in 2005, the Cougar Dome is the home court for the Cougar basketball and volleyball teams. It houses two locker rooms, athletic training room, and a weight room that is open to athletes, students, and staff.

Brian Wilson Field
Located at the Batavia Township Sports Complex, Brian Wilson Field has been the home field for UC Clermont baseball since 2013. Made possible by former Cincinnati Reds player Jay Bruce and the Reds Community Fund, the field was named after former Reds scout Brian Wilson.

Soccer
The UC Clermont soccer teams do not currently have a permanent home field. While the teams have grass practice space on campus, their home games are primarily played on the turf fields at Scudamore Stadium on the campus of nearby Northern Kentucky University and Gettler Stadium on the campus of the University of Cincinnati.
